= The Night Is Ours (1930 film) =

1930 film

- Directed by: Roger Lion; Carl Froelich; Henry Roussel
- Written by: Henry Kistemaeckers (play); Walter Reisch; Walter Supper
- Produced by: Carl Froelich
- Starring: Marie Bell; Henry Roussel; Jean Murat
- Cinematography: Georges Asselin; Lucien Bellavoine; Reimar Kuntze; Charles Métain
- Music by: Hanson Milde-Meissner
- Production companies: Carl Froelich-Film; Tobis Film
- Distributed by: Films P.J. de Venloo
- Release date: 10 January 1930
- Running time: 100 minutes
- Country: Germany
- Language: French

The Night Is Ours (French: La nuit est à nous) is a 1930 German drama film directed by Roger Lion, Carl Froelich and Henry Roussel and starring Marie Bell, Henry Roussel and Jean Murat. It was made in Berlin as the French-language version of the 1929 German film The Night Belongs to Us. The film is the first example of those international productions with a French version. It was shot at the Tempelhof Studios of UFA.

The film received mildly positive response, praising the performances of Bell, Roussel and Gérald.

== Cast ==
- Marie Bell as Bettine de Barsac
- Henry Roussel as Léon Grandet
- Jean Murat as Henri Brécourt
- Jim Gérald as Barsac père
- Mary Costes as Madame Brécourt
- May Vincent as Odette Thompson
- Kitty Kelly as Maud Sarazin
- Caralli as Le prince russe
- Geneviève Cargese as Une femme
- Georges Galli as Alain
- Germano
- Pierre Juvenet as Sam Burtley
- Louise Lagrange
- Jeannie Luxeuil
- Max Maxudian as Prosper Besagne
- Vony Myriame
- Renée Passeur
- Marthe Sarbel as Nadan
- André Vetti as Monsieur Barsac

== Bibliography ==
- Crisp, Colin G. (1993). The Classic French Cinema, 1930–1960. Indiana University Press. ISBN 978-0-253-21115-6.
