= Ripening Youth =

Ripening Youth may refer to:

- Ripening Youth (1955 film), a West German drama film
- Ripening Youth (1933 film), a German drama film
