= If We All Were Angels =

If We All Were Angels may refer to:

- If We All Were Angels (1936 film), a German comedy film
- If We All Were Angels (1956 film), a West German comedy film, a remake of the 1936 film
