= The Fox of Glenarvon =

1940 film by Max W. Kimmich

- Directed by: Max W. Kimmich
- Written by: Hans Bertram; Wolf Neumeister
- Based on: Der Fuchs von Glenarvon by Nicola Rhon
- Produced by: Herbert Engelsing
- Starring: Olga Chekhova; Karl Ludwig Diehl; Ferdinand Marian; Elisabeth Flickenschildt
- Cinematography: Fritz Arno Wagner
- Edited by: Willy Zeyn
- Music by: Otto Konradt
- Production company: Tobis Film
- Distributed by: Tobis Filmkunst
- Release date: 24 April 1940
- Running time: 91 minutes
- Country: Nazi Germany
- Language: German

The Fox of Glenarvon (German: Der Fuchs von Glenarvon) is a 1940 Nazi German anti-British propaganda drama film produced in World War II portraying Irish War of Independence in the aftermath of World War I. It was produced in 1940 by Max W. Kimmich and starred Olga Chekhova, Karl Ludwig Diehl, Ferdinand Marian and others. The screenplay was written by Wolf Neumeister and Hans Bertram based on a novel of the same title by Nicola Rhon (Maria von Kirchbach) that had been published by the Ullstein publishing house in 1937. It was made at the Johannisthal Studios in Berlin, with sets designed by the art directors Wilhelm Depenau and Otto Erdmann. The shoot lasted from December 1939 to February 1940. It passed censorship on 22 April 1940 and had its debut in Berlin's Ufa-Palast am Zoo two days later.

== Synopsis ==
Set in 1921, the film takes place in the fictional Irish county of Glenarvon, somewhere in the northwest of County Galway, and tells the story of Gloria Grandison, an Irish wife of the local British magistrate who falls in love with an Irish nationalist and leaves her husband for him.

== Cast ==
- Olga Chekhova as Gloria Grandison
- Karl Ludwig Diehl as Baron John Ennis of Loweland
- Ferdinand Marian as Friedensrichter (Justice of the Peace) Grandison
- Elisabeth Flickenschildt as Brigit Erskynne
- Traudl Stark as Kit Ennis of Loweland
- Albert Florath as Baron O'Connor
- Lucie Höflich as Baroness Margit O'Connor
- Else von Möllendorff as Mary-Ann O'Connor
- Richard Häussler as Major McKenney
- Ellen Bang as Lady McKenney
- Curt Lucas as Bankier (Bank Manager) Beverly
- Werner Hinz as Sir Tetbury
- Hermann Braun as Desmond O'Morrow
- Hans Mierendorff as Vater (Father) O'Morrow
- Paul Otto as Oberst (Colonel) Stewart
- Hans Richter as Robin Cavendish
- Horst Birr as Rory
- Peter Elsholtz as Tim Malory
- Aribert Mog as Thomas Deally
- Hilde Körber as Gouvernante (Schoolmistress) Maureen
- Friedrich Kayßler as O'Riordon
- Bruno Hübner as Mildon
- Joachim Pfaff as Patrick Granison
- Karl Dannemann as Pat Moore
- Bernhard Goetzke as Duff O'Mally
- Karl Hannemann as Strandvogt (Beach Warden) Thripp
- Franz Weber as Hausmeister (Janitor) Donnelly
- Albert Venohr as Polizist (Constable) Beardsley
- Ferdinand Terpe as Polizist (Constable) Koph
- Hanns Waschatko as Diener (Manservant) Morrison

== Background ==
Made at the beginning of the war between Nazi Germany and the United Kingdom, the film stands in a long line of anti-British propaganda films. Therefore, the love story is only a vehicle for the theory of the superiority of the "earthy" Irish race over the "rotten" British race, and as in My Life for Ireland, the British are portrayed as brutal and unscrupulous. The film, does not, however, operate on such crude anti-British stereotypes as such later films as Uncle Krüger and Carl Peters, which were filmed after Hitler and the Nazis had given up hope of making peace with Britain.

The Irish campaign for independence is also depicted less historically and more in the manner of the Nazi seizure of power, including the disruption of a funeral as in the film Hans Westmar.

== Awards ==
Shortly after release, the film was graded artistically valuable by film checkers of the Propaganda Ministry. This attribute was given to movies that fulfilled special aesthetic criteria besides the actors' performances and meant that cinemas had to pay less entertainment tax when showing this film. Even Goebbels was quite enthusiastic about the final movie: on 22 April 1940, he wrote in his diary: "Now it's great and very useful for our propaganda."

== Further information ==
The film was shown in many foreign countries, especially those that were allied with Nazi Germany, such as Finland, where it made its debut on 8 March 1942 under the title of Rakkaus voittaa kaikken. Later it was renamed there to Vapauden liekki, and in 1941, it was banned from the stages. The movie was also shown in Italy (La volpe insanguinata), Greece (I epanastatis) and even in the Soviet Union (Vozmezdie). After the war, it was banned by the Allies.

== See also ==
- Nazi propaganda and the United Kingdom

== Bibliography ==
- filmportal.de
- Klaus, Ulrich J.: German sound films. Encyclopedia of full-length German movies (1929–1945), sorted by their German debut dates. - Berlin [et al.], 1940.
