= The Last Ones Shall Be First =

1957 film

- Film poster
- Directed by: Rolf Hansen
- Written by: John Galsworthy (play); Jochen Huth
- Produced by: Artur Brauner
- Starring: O. E. Hasse; Ulla Jacobsson; Maximilian Schell
- Cinematography: Franz Weihmayr
- Edited by: Anna Hollering
- Music by: Mark Lothar
- Production company: CCC Film
- Distributed by: Constantin Film
- Release date: 27 June 1957
- Running time: 94 minutes
- Country: West Germany
- Language: German

The Last Ones Shall Be First (German: Die Letzten werden die Ersten sein) is a 1957 West German crime film directed by Rolf Hansen and starring O.E. Hasse, Ulla Jacobsson and Maximilian Schell. It is based on the short play The First and the Last by John Galsworthy which had previously been adapted into a British film 21 Days. It was entered into the 7th Berlin International Film Festival. It was shot at the Spandau Studios in Berlin and on location in Hamburg. The film's sets were designed by the art directors Kurt Herlth and Robert Herlth.

== Cast ==
- O. E. Hasse as Ludwig Darrandt
- Ulla Jacobsson as Wanda
- Maximilian Schell as Lorenz Darrandt
- Adelheid Seeck as Charlotte Darrandt
- Brigitte Grothum as Irene Darrandt
- Bruno Hübner as Bettler
- Peter Mosbacher as Zuhälter
- Hans Quest as Junger Anwalt

== Bibliography ==
- Bock, Hans-Michael & Bergfelder, Tim. The Concise CineGraph. Encyclopedia of German Cinema. Berghahn Books, 2009.
