= The Four Companions (film) =

1938 film directed by Carl Froelich

- DVD cover
- Directed by: Carl Froelich
- Written by: Jochen Huth (play and screenplay)
- Produced by: Carl Froelich
- Starring: Ingrid Bergman; Sabine Peters; Carsta Löck; Ursula Herking
- Cinematography: Reimar Kuntze
- Edited by: Gustav Lohse
- Music by: Hanson Milde-Meissner
- Production company: Tonfilmstudio Carl Froelich
- Distributed by: UFA
- Release date: 1 October 1938
- Running time: 96 minutes
- Country: Germany
- Language: German

The Four Companions (German: Die vier Gesellen) is a 1938 German drama film directed by Carl Froelich and starring Ingrid Bergman, Sabine Peters and Carsta Löck. Jochen Huth adapted the script from his own play. It was shot at the Tempelhof Studios in Berlin with sets designed by the art director Franz Schroedter. The film was intended as a star vehicle to launch Bergman's career in Germany following her success in several Swedish films.

== Synopsis ==
After graduation, four female art students attempt to set up their own advertising agency. At first, they fail to achieve their goal in a male dominated field. But, after trying once more, they succeed. However, they also have different views and wishes in life, from wanting to be an artist to being a homemaker, which makes running the company increasingly difficult.

== Cast ==
- Ingrid Bergman as Marianne Kruge
- Sabine Peters as Käthe Winter
- Carsta Löck as Lotte Waag
- Ursula Herking as Franziska
- Hans Söhnker as Stefan Kohlund
- Leo Slezak as Professor Lange
- Erich Ponto as Regierungsrat Alfred Hintze
- Heinz Welzel as Feinmechaniker Martin Bachmann
- Rudolf Klicks as Direktor der graphischen Berufsschule
- Karl Haubenreißer as Direktor der Seidenstrumpffabrik
- Lotte Braun as Sekretärin des Fabrikdirektors
- Wilhelm P. Krüger as Maurermeister am Neubau
- Willi Rose as Straßenbahnschaffner
- Max Rosenhauer as Hauswart
- Ernst G. Schiffner as Geschäftsmann, der keinen Auftrag erteilt
- Hans Juergen Weidlich as Berliner Jüngling an der Litfaßsäule
- Kurt Mikulski as Ausstellungsdiener
- Fritz Lafontaine as 1. Grafikschüler
- Gustaf Dennert as 2. Grafikschüler
- Zarah Leander as Singer
- Traute Bengen
- Hugo Froelich

== Bibliography ==
- Ascheid, Antje (2010) [2003]. Hitler's Heroines: Stardom and Womanhood in Nazi Cinema. Philadelphia: Temple University Press. ISBN 978-1-59213-843-2.
- Chandler, Charlotte (2007). Ingrid: Ingrid Bergman, A Personal Biography. New York: Simon and Schuster. ISBN 978-1-4165-3914-8.
- Lunde, Arne (2010). Nordic Exposures: Scandinavian Identities in Classical Hollywood Cinema. Seattle: University of Washington Press. ISBN 978-0-295-99045-3.
