= The Private Life of Louis XIV =

- Directed by: Carl Froelich
- Written by: Karl Peter Gillmann; Wolfgang Hoffmann-Harnisch; Carl Froelich
- Produced by: Carl Froelich
- Starring: Renate Müller; Eugen Klöpfer; Maria Krahn; Maly Delschaft
- Cinematography: Reimar Kuntze
- Edited by: Gustav Lohse
- Music by: Alois Melichar
- Production company: Carl Froelich-Film
- Distributed by: Tobis Film
- Release date: 8 August 1935
- Running time: 93 minutes
- Country: Germany
- Language: German

The Private Life of Louis XIV or Liselotte of the Palatinate (German: Liselotte von der Pfalz) is a 1935 German historical film directed by Carl Froelich and starring Renate Müller, Eugen Klöpfer, and Maria Krahn. It was shot at the Tempelhof Studios in Berlin and premiered at the city's UFA-Palast am Zoo. The sets were designed by the art directors Walter Haag and Franz Schroedter. The film's English language release title is a reference to the hit British film The Private Life of Henry VIII (1933).

The film portrays the life of the Heidelberg-born Elizabeth Charlotte, Madame Palatine, who married into the French royal family during the reign of Louis XIV. She was also the subject of a 1966 biopic in which she was played by Heidelinde Weis.

== Cast ==
- Renate Müller as Liselotte von der Pfalz
- Eugen Klöpfer as Prince Karl Ludwig
- Maria Krahn as The Princess
- Maly Delschaft as Luise von Degenfeld
- Edith Oß as Anneliese von Degenfeld
- Ida Wüst as Countess Sophie von Hannover
- Renate Howe as Princess Charlotte
- Maria Seidler as Mrs. von Uffeln
- Eduard Bornträger as Haushofmeister des Kurfürsten
- Michael Bohnen as King Louis XIV of France
- Hans Stüwe as Philippe, Duke of Orléans
- Else Ehser as Queen Maria Theresa
- Petra Unkel as The Dauphin
- Dorothea Wieck as Madame de Maintenon
- Lothar Körner as Marquis Louvois
- Alexander Golling as General Mélac
- Hans Adalbert Schlettow as the commander of French troops in Heidelberg
- Aribert Wäscher as Chevalier de la Lorraine
- Heinz von Cleve as Roland de Saint Cour
- Maria Reisenhofer as The Abbess of Maubuisson
- Valy Arnheim
- Hilde Hildebrand as Duchesse de Montespan
- Franz Klebusch
- Fritz Lafontaine
- Maria Meissner as Marquise de la Valliere
- Anneliese Würtz

== Bibliography ==
- Hake, Sabine. Popular Cinema of the Third Reich. University of Texas Press, 2001.
