= The Heart of the Queen =

1940 film

- Directed by: Carl Froelich
- Written by: Harald Braun
- Produced by: Carl Froelich for Tonfilm-Studio Carl Froelich & Co. (Berlin) in UFA (Berlin)
- Starring: Zarah Leander
- Cinematography: Franz Weihmayr
- Edited by: Gustav Lohse
- Music by: Theo Mackeben
- Production company: UFA
- Distributed by: UFA
- Release date: 1940
- Running time: 112 minutes
- Country: Germany
- Language: German

The Heart of the Queen (Das Herz der Königin) is a 1940 German historical film, making selective use of the life story of Mary, Queen of Scots, and her execution by Queen Elizabeth I for anti-English and pro-Scottish propaganda, in the context of the Second World War going on at the time.

It was shot at the Tempelhof Studios in Berlin. The film's sets were designed by the art director Walter Haag.

== Plot ==
The film starts with Mary Stuart, Queen of Scots, held prisoner in Fotheringhay Castle, awaiting the final judgment in her case, which is expected within a few hours. Soon she finds out that the Royal Court has sentenced her, with the assent of Queen Elizabeth I, to be executed on the scaffold on the following day. She breaks down and remembers the events leading to her now imminent death. The bulk of the film consists of this flashback.

The young Mary arrives from France to Scotland, as the lawful queen of Scots, only to encounter a strong opposition. Her half-brother, Jacob Stuart, who had ruled the country until then, asserts that a woman is incapable of ruling the "rough" and "male" land of Scotland and that she should have remained in "feminine" France. The lords, headed by Lord Bothwell, face Mary Stuart critically. Moreover, immediately upon her arrival, Mary faces an assassination attempt with poisoned wine by Johanna (Jean) Gordon, whose Clan Gordon was at feud with the Stuarts for many years.

Members of the Privy Council, whom Mary summons to deal with the first political decisions to be announced, do not show up. The only one present is Jacob Stuart, who tears up the document presented for his signature. When the queen is alone again, Lord Bothwell arrives and confesses that he had fallen in love with her. Mary Stuart orders him arrested for insulting the queen, even though she is impressed by his demeanor.

Meanwhile, Queen Elizabeth I, angered that with a lawful Catholic queen taking over Scotland will limit her influence there and threaten her right to the throne in England, sends to Scotland her confidant Henry Darnley, who is both an English peer and a Scottish lord, to spy for her and to raise the population against Mary Stuart.

Nevertheless, Darnley falls in love with Queen Mary and leads her to Lord Bothwell's castle, where the Scottish lords meet secretly to plot the queen's deposition. Mary ventures alone into the meeting and becomes imprisoned.

She is released the next day, but only after having been made to swear an oath that she would marry a Scot. Mary Stuart's choice falls on Lord Bothwell, whom she believes to be still in captivity. It turns out, however, that he had fled with Jean Gordon and has married her. The two of them raise an army with the aim of overthrowing Mary. Jean wants revenge on the queen and the Stuarts, and Lord Bothwell wants power.

The queen is constrained to marry Lord Darnley, but becomes involved with the Italian singer David Riccio. Eventually, she gives birth to a boy child, James, the future King James I.

A troupe of itinerant actors stages a play hinting broadly that Riccio is the queen's lover and might be the father of her child. Lord Darnley feels mocked and indignant and therefore authorizes a plot in which Riccio is assassinated.

At this time Lord Bothwells' army appears, which the queen allows to enter Lord Bothwell's castle and temporarily take over power in the land "for the queen's own protection". However, Lord Darnley has fallen ill with smallpox. On the advice of Lord Bothwell, now her lover, Mary has her ill husband brought to Edinburgh, where he dies in an explosion at his home.

Now Queen Elizabeth sends an army to Scotland to release Mary Stuart from the power of Bothwell and to offer to her refuge in England, which is actually a trap meant to imprison Mary and keep her away from the throne of Scotland.

Meanwhile, Mary Stuart had married Lord Bothwell, who had separated from Jean Gordon. The wedding is interrupted when the English army appears under the guidance of Jacob Stuart, the queen's half-brother, who presents secret love letters which Mary Stuart had sent to Bothwell while still married to her previous husband. Olivier, the queen's page, is killed while attempting to hide the letters.

Lord Bothwell is faced with the choice of standing by Mary Stuart and dying or denying her. He turns away from her, but the treacherous Jacob Stuart still sentences him to death by dragging (in actual history he fled to Denmark where the king treated him cruelly and where he eventually died in prison; all of which is not mentioned in the film). When Jacob Stuart takes her child James to protect him from Queen Elizabeth, Mary Stuart accepts the offer of the English queen and goes into exile in England, which sets up her path to the scaffold.

The frame story from the beginning resumes. Mary makes peace with dying and pledges her undying devotion to her ladies-in-waiting, the people of Scotland, and the many men she loved and lost. The next morning Mary Stuart, in a stunning bejeweled red gown, is lead to the scaffold and kneels down in prayer as she awaits the sharp hatchet to fall.

== Cast ==
The cast included

- Zarah Leander: Mary, Queen of Scots
- Walther Suessenguth: Lord Jacob Stuart (James Stewart, 1st Earl of Moray)
- Willy Birgel: Lord Bothwell (James Hepburn, 4th Earl of Bothwell)
- Maria Koppenhöfer: Queen Elizabeth I
- Lotte Koch: Johanna Gordon (Jean Gordon, Countess of Bothwell)
- Axel von Ambesser: Henry Darnley (Henry Stuart, Lord Darnley)
- Friedrich Benfer: David Riccio
- Will Quadflieg: Page Olivier
- Hubert von Meyerinck: Sir John
- Erich Ponto: Itinerant actor
- Ursula Herking: Member of the itinerant actors' troupe
- Hans Hessling: Nelson, Henry Darnley's Companion
- Margot Hielscher: One of the Four Marys
- Herbert Hübner: Lord Arran (James Hamilton, 2nd Earl of Arran)
- Rudolf Klein-Rogge: Ruthven, General of the Scottish Palace Guard
- Eduard von Winterstein: an English General
- Josef Sieber: Paris, a Scottish prison guard
- Ernst Stahl-Nachbaur: John Knox
- Emil Heß:Lord Douglas

== The heart as a theme ==
The theme of the heart's emotions is repeated throughout the whole film. The cold Elizabeth I who had edged any love out of her own life is contrasted with the extremely emotional Mary Stuart, whose life is filled (as presented in the film) by love. When Queen Elizabeth learns of the birth of the Scottish heir to the throne gets, she exclaims: "I rule and she loves!". One of the lofty expressions Mary says in the film: "Kings win in life - hearts, in eternity".

Mary Stuart appears guided exclusively by emotions. She says: "My heart has guided me; it is the only thing that leads me." The biggest mistake of her life, the marriage with Lord Darnley, shows the exception: "It is about the crown, not about your heart" Darnley says in the film. Nevertheless, it is noted that their common son, the future King James I would be a good ruler but, as one of the courtiers says to Queen Mary, he will "have a big heart".

== Production ==
"Das Herz der Königin" was filmed from November 1939 to March 1940 in the Babelsberg film studio.

On 29 October 1940 the film censorship board classified the film as "unsuitable for minors" but otherwise "valuable" both "artistically" and "culturally".

The premiere took place on 1 November 1940 in the München Ufa-Palace ("Luitpold-Theater")

The film is punctuated by numerous songs, mostly sung by Zarah Leander:

- "A black stone, a white stone" (Zarah Leander)
- "Where is your heart" (Zarah Leander)
- "Slumber song" (Zarah Leander)
- "Once a foreign guest comes to you" (Zarah Leander, Friedrich Benfer)
- "If only you do not think of it, nothing will hurt you" (Erich Ponto)

The text was written by Harald Braun, the music by Theo Mackeben.

- In 1941 Harald Braun published a novelization, also titled Das Herz der Königin.

== Criticism ==
Das Herz der Königin became a failure in its time and today counts as one of the weakest of Zarah Leander's films.

The International Film Encyclopedia criticized the film as a work from the Nazi era with a strong anti-British bias. According to German scholar Theodor Riegler, "the depiction of the cold ruler Elizabeth I was aimed at presenting the early history of [British] striving for world domination, which would have consequences 'for all parts of the Earth during centuries up to the present' “, thus implicitly justifying Germany's war with Britain at the time."

Moreover, critics noted that "The extreme miscasting of Zarah Leander in the leading role added to the film's kitsch an unintended comic element", that the "film is superficial and pseudo-historical" and that in "her stiff splendid evening gowns as Mary Stuart, Leander could hardly move".
