= The Life and Loves of Tschaikovsky =

1939 film directed by Carl Froelich

- Directed by: Carl Froelich
- Written by: Géza von Cziffra (novel, screenplay); Frank Thieß; Georg Wittuhn; Jean Victor
- Produced by: Carl Froelich
- Starring: Zarah Leander; Aribert Wäscher; Hans Stüwe; Marika Rökk
- Cinematography: Franz Weihmayr
- Edited by: Gustav Lohse
- Music by: Theo Mackeben
- Production company: UFA
- Distributed by: UFA
- Release date: 13 August 1939
- Running time: 94 minutes
- Country: Germany
- Language: German

The Life and Loves of Tschaikovsky or It Was a Lovely Night at the Ball (German: Es war eine rauschende Ballnacht) is a 1939 German historical drama film directed by Carl Froelich and starring Zarah Leander, Aribert Wäscher and Hans Stüwe. It premiered on 13 August 1939 at the Venice Film Festival.

It was shot at the Tempelhof Studios in Berlin. The film's sets were designed by the art director Franz Schroedter.

== Synopsis ==
The film portrays a fictional relationship between the Russian composer Pjotr Iljitsch Tschaikowsky and an aristocratic woman who, unhappily married, falls in love with him and decides to secretly support his work financially.

== Cast ==
- Zarah Leander as Katharina Alexandrowna Murakina
- Aribert Wäscher as Michael Iwanowitsch Murakin
- Hans Stüwe as Pjotr Iljitsch Tschaikowsky
- Marika Rökk as Nastassja Petrowna Jarowa, Dancer
- Leo Slezak as Prof. Otto Hunsinger
- Fritz Rasp as Porphyr Philippowitsch Kruglikow, Kritiker
- Paul Dahlke as Iwan Casarowitsch Glykow, Music publisher
- Hugo Froelich as Vater Jarow
- Karl Haubenreißer as Gruda, Konzertagent
- Karl Hellmer as Stepan, Butler
- Wolfgang von Schwindt as Onkel Jarow
- Kurt Vespermann as Ferdyschtschenko
- Traute Bengen as Mother waiting at Station
- Eduard Bornträger as Schwager Jarow
- Ernst Dumcke as Dmitri Pawlowitsch Miljukin
- Max Harry Ernst as Guest at Concert
- Claire Glib as Eine dicke Dame
- Lotte Goebel as Sonja, Katharina's Maid
- Grete Greef-Fabri as Mutter Jarrow
- Karl Hannemann as Pjotr, Murakins Butler
- Eva Immermann as Eine junge Fürstin
- Gerda Kuhlmey as Katharina's Guest
- Maria Loja as Elsa Siebeneiner
- Benno Mueller as Gast beim Konzert
- Maria Reisenhofer as Eine alte Fürstin
- Ferdinand Robert as Guest at Masked Ball
- Franz Stein as Dr. Ossorgin
- Arnim Suessenguth as Großfürst Konstantin Konstantinowitsch
- Leopold von Ledebur as Ein General
- Eva Wegener as Katharina's Guest

== Bibliography ==
- Kreimeier, Klaus (1999). The Ufa Story: A History of Germany's Greatest Film Company, 1918–1945. University of California Press. ISBN 978-0-520-22069-0.
- Reimer, Robert C.; Reimer, Carol J. (2010). The A to Z of German Cinema. Scarecrow Press. ISBN 978-1-4617-3186-3.
