= Adelheid Seeck =

German film actress (1912–1973)

- Born: 3 November 1912; Berlin, German Empire
- Died: 17 February 1973 (aged 60); Stuttgart, West Germany
- Occupation: Actor
- Years active: 1941–1972

Adelheid Seeck (3 November 1912 – 17 February 1973) was a German film actress. She appeared in 27 films between 1941 and 1972. She starred in The Last Ones Shall Be First, which was entered into the 7th Berlin International Film Festival.

== Selected filmography ==
- The Noltenius Brothers (1945)
- Where the Trains Go (1949)
- Three Girls Spinning (1950)
- The Day Before the Wedding (1952)
- Once I Will Return (1953)
- Ripening Youth (1955)
- Anastasia: The Czar's Last Daughter (1956)
- Devil in Silk (1956)
- The Last Ones Shall Be First (1957)
- Mädchen in Uniform (1958)
- The Rest Is Silence (1959)
- The Last Witness (1960)
- My Husband, the Economic Miracle (1961)
- Mark of the Tortoise (1964)
- Girls Behind Bars (1965)
