= When the Cock Crows =

1936 film directed by Carl Froelich

- Directed by: Carl Froelich
- Written by: Axel Eggebrecht; August Hinrichs
- Based on: When the Cock Crows by August Hinrichs
- Produced by: Carl Froelich
- Starring: Heinrich George; Hans Brausewetter; Marianne Hoppe
- Cinematography: Reimar Kuntze
- Edited by: Gustav Lohse
- Music by: Hanson Milde-Meissner
- Production company: Carl Froelich-Film
- Distributed by: Europa Film
- Release date: 23 March 1936
- Running time: 90 minutes
- Country: Germany
- Language: German

When the Cock Crows (German: Wenn der Hahn kräht) is a 1936 German comedy film directed by Carl Froelich and starring Heinrich George, Hans Brausewetter and Marianne Hoppe. It was shot at the National Studios in Berlin. The film's sets were designed by the art directors Walter Haag and Franz Schroedter. It is based on a folk play of the same title by August Hinrichs.

== Synopsis ==
Lena, the daughter of the grouchy mayor in a rural village in Northern Germany, is in love with Peter, a young veterinarian. However, her parents are against the match as she has already been promised to another man who is due to inherit a farm. He is in turn courted by Marie, a woman who has recently arrived in the area.

== Cast ==
- Heinrich George as Jan Kreyenborg, Gemeindevorsteher
- Hans Brausewetter as Peter Renken, Tierarzt
- Marianne Hoppe as Marie
- Claire Reigbert as Gesine Kreyenborg
- Hildegard Barko as Lena Kreyenborg
- Carsta Löck as Stine
- Fritz Hoopts as Willem Tameling, Knecht
- Wilhelm P. Krüger as Jochen Witt, Schneider
- Karl John as Piepers Gustav
- Ernst Waldow as Kröger, Amtshauptmann
- Hugo Froelich as Stindt, Wachtmeister
- Paul Luka as Peter Witt, Viehhändler
- Paul Rehkopf as Dorfarzt
- Maria Seidler as Frau des Dorfarztes
- Eugenie Dengler as Mädchen an der Kirmesbude

== Bibliography ==
- Bock, Hans-Michael & Bergfelder, Tim. The Concise CineGraph. Encyclopedia of German Cinema. Berghahn Books, 2009.
- Klaus, Ulrich J. Deutsche Tonfilme: Jahrgang 1936. Klaus-Archiv, 1988.
