= Gitta Discovers Her Heart =

1932 film directed by Carl Froelich

- German film poster
- German: Gitta entdeckt ihr Herz
- Directed by: Carl Froelich
- Written by: Johannes Brandt; Erich Faber; Thilde Förster
- Produced by: Friedrich Pflughaupt
- Starring: Gitta Alpar; Gustav Fröhlich; Paul Kemp
- Cinematography: Curt Courant
- Edited by: Oswald Hafenrichter; Hanson Milde-Meissner
- Music by: Nicholas Brodszky
- Production company: Carl Froelich-Film
- Distributed by: Metropol-Filmverleih
- Release date: 5 April 1932
- Running time: 95 minutes
- Country: Germany
- Language: German

Gitta Discovers Her Heart (German: Gitta entdeckt ihr Herz) is a 1932 German musical film directed by Carl Froelich and starring Gitta Alpar, Gustav Fröhlich, and Paul Kemp. It was shot at the Johannisthal Studios in Berlin. The film's sets were designed by the art director Franz Schroedter.

== Plot ==
While looking for new members in a small Hungarian village, the Prímás of a music ensemble comes across the young Gitta Farkas, who confidently performs her song with a beautiful voice. She is accepted and soon becomes a celebrated revue star. In the period that follows, she travels the world with the ensemble.

During a train ride to a performance in Berlin, Prímás Gitta makes advances to her. However, she rejects him and leaves the train in Berlin before the destination station. After boarding a double-decker bus, she strikes up a conversation with her seat neighbor Peter, a young composer, to whom she suggests that he shouldn't compose such serious music. When she has to get off - without a ticket and without money - Peter also gets off and takes her home. Peter sneaks with Gitta past the party his wealthy father is giving to the upper floor and rehearses the song that Gitta is humming to him on his grand piano.

While Peter is then taken over by the guests, Gitta drapes a large silk scarf around her body and mingles with the guests, where the host greets her delightedly. When her “dress” comes loose at the back and his father confronts Peter about Gitta, he angrily leaves the house with Gitta, telling his father that he wants to make his own way through life. At the door, he meets his friend Fred, who wants to borrow money from him. Fred takes Peter and Gitta to his shack under the roof. The men do not suspect that the young woman is already an extremely successful singer.

In order to pay the bill for a taxi, Gitta sends the driver to the hotel where the musical ensemble is staying, to her dance partner János, who is supposed to pay the bill. Meanwhile, Peter asks his publisher for an advance payment for the newly composed song. However, he declines, pointing out that the printing of his irrelevant compositions had been paid for by his father. In the meantime, the Prímás has pulled out all the stops to find his star and even offered a large reward, but Gitta has disappeared. He can't count on her understudy, Ilona, because she's so excited that she can't make a sound. Shortly before the upcoming premiere, Gitta returns to the Prímás because she wants to help her Peter.

The Prímás is so relieved his star has returned that he allows Gitta to sing Peter's song. When Peter sees his Gitta as the big star of the revue at the premiere, who performs his song with great success, he believes that she has played a joke on him. Despite all the misunderstandings, the young couple finally finds their way back together.

== Cast ==
- Gitta Alpar as Gitta Farkas
- Gustav Fröhlich as Peter, composer
- Paul Kemp as Fred, their friend
- Tibor Halmay as Janos
- Leonard Steckel as the primate
- Oscar Sabo as Peter's father
- Blandine Ebinger as Ilona
- Gerhard Dammann
- Heinz Sarnow
- Fritz Spira
- Egon Brosig
- Kurt Lilien
