= Carsta Löck =

German actress (1902–1993)

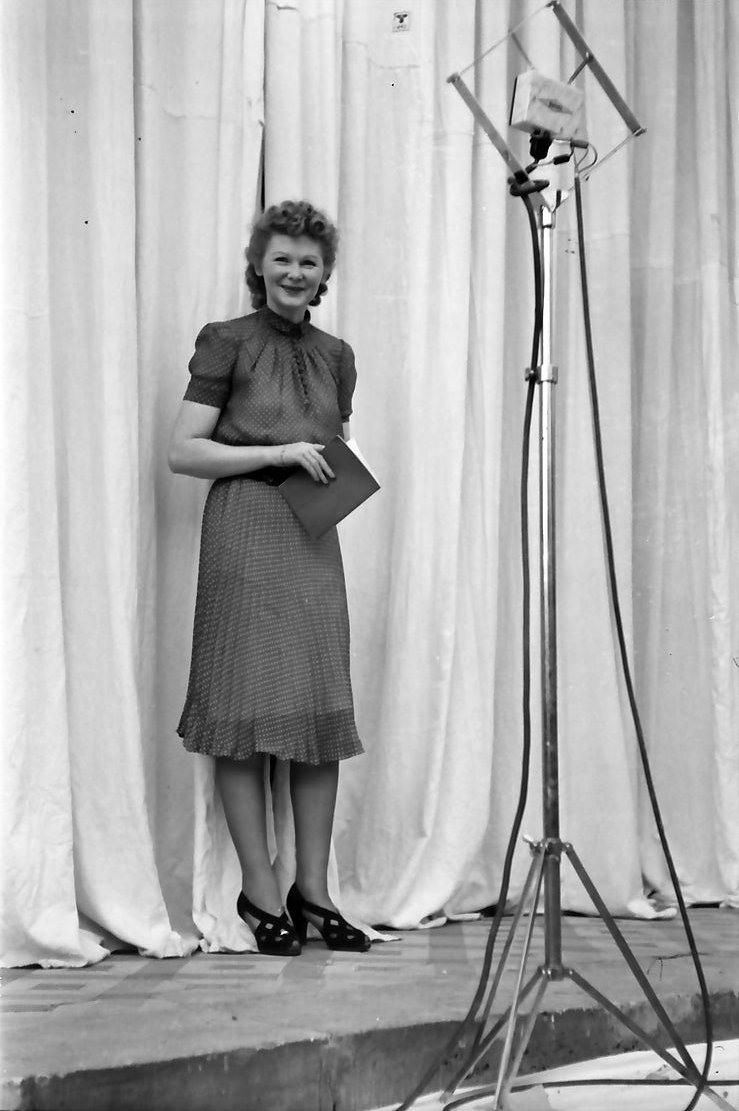
- Carsta Löck in 1942
- Born: 28 December 1902; Deezbüll, Schleswig-Holstein, German Empire
- Died: 19 October 1993 (aged 90); Berlin, Germany
- Occupation: Film actress
- Years active: 1933–1983

Carsta Löck (28 December 1902 – 9 October 1993) was a German film actress.

== Life ==
The daughter of a merchant grew up in Kiel and worked as a typographer. After training as an actor, she made her debut as Rosi in Hermann Sudermann's The Butterfly Battle in Berlin in 1930. In the same year she received an engagement at the touring theater of the German Volksbühnenvereine Berlin. From 1934 she made guest appearances on various Berlin stages such as the Theater am Nollendorfplatz, Lessingtheater, Komödie, Kammerspiele of the Deutsches Theater, Tribüne, Renaissance Theater and Schlossparktheater. Towards the end of the war she was also at the front in looking after the troops. In 1944 she was on the list of God-gifted people of the Reich Ministry for Public Enlightenment and Propaganda. After the war she continued her theater work in Berlin.

From 1933 she was frequently cast in feature films, especially comedy films. She was soon set on the simple girl from the country and played, mostly in supporting roles and often with a pinch of comedy, maids, soldiers' brides, wives, housekeepers, secretaries and neighbors. In post-war films she was able to continue this role type as a mother or grandmother. Among other things, she played Ida Jungmann in the Buddenbrooks film adaptation of 1959. She also acted in two early DEFA films, namely in Die Kuckucks and as the fun-loving bartender Emma in Die Buntkarierte. In 1959 she was seen on screen alongside the siblings Willy and Lucy Millowitsch in Arnold and Bach's comedy Der Keusche Lebemann in a recording from the Millowitsch Theater. She later gained popularity again as Krösa Maja in the Swedish film and television series about Emil from Lönneberga. In the German version of the cinema version, however, she was dubbed by her fellow actress Carola Höhn. In 1989 she received the film ribbon in gold for many years of outstanding work in German film.

== Selected filmography ==
- Refugees (1933)
- When the Village Music Plays on Sunday Nights (1933)
- Ripening Youth (1933)
- The Double Fiance (1934)
- Trouble with Jolanthe (1934)
- Police Report (1934)
- The Four Musketeers (1934)
- The Valiant Navigator (1935)
- Everything for a Woman (1935)
- Uncle Bräsig (1936)
- Game on Board (1936)
- When the Cock Crows (1936)
- Heimweh (1937)
- Autobus S (1937)
- An Enemy of the People (1937)
- The Four Companions (1938)
- Shoulder Arms (1939)
- Cadets (1939)
- The Wedding Trip (1939)
- D III 88 (1939)
- Legion Condor (1939)
- The Girl at the Reception (1940)
- Her Private Secretary (1940)
- Battle Squadron Lützow (1941)
- Above All Else in the World (1941)
- Jakko (1941)
- Voice of the Heart (1942)
- The Crew of the Dora (1943)
- A Beautiful Day (1944)
- A Cheerful House (1944)
- Between Yesterday and Tomorrow (1947)
- Film Without a Title (1948)
- Friday the Thirteenth (1949)
- Derby (1949)
- Girls in Gingham (1949)
- The Great Mandarin (1949)
- The Cuckoos (1949)
- Wedding with Erika (1950)
- Weekend in Paradise (1952)
- Holiday From Myself (1952)
- Captain Bay-Bay (1953)
- Dutch Girl (1953)
- Lady's Choice (1953)
- Christina (1953)
- The Country Schoolmaster (1954)
- It Was Always So Nice With You (1954)
- A Woman of Today (1954)
- The Angel with the Flaming Sword (1954)
- The Major and the Bulls (1955)
- Reaching for the Stars (1955)
- Melody of the Heart (1956)
- Fruit in the Neighbour's Garden (1956)
- Melody of the Heath (1956)
- Three Birch Trees on the Heath (1956)
- Widower with Five Daughters (1957)
- Man in the River (1958)
- My Schoolfriend (1958)
- The Buddenbrooks (1959)
- Paprika (1959)
- Two Times Adam, One Time Eve (1959)
- My Schoolfriend (1960)
- Aurora Marriage Bureau (1962)
- Girls Behind Bars (1965)
- Vier Stunden von Elbe 1 (1968, TV film)
- Einer fehlt beim Kurkonzert (1968, TV film)
- Emil i Lönneberga (1971)
- New Mischief by Emil (1972)
- Emil and the Piglet (1973)

== Bibliography ==
- Baird, Jay W. (1992). To Die for Germany: Heroes in the Nazi Pantheon. Bloomington: Indiana University Press. ISBN 978-0-253-20757-9.
