= Fritz Hoopts =

German actor

- Born: 5 June 1875; Oldenburg, German Empire
- Died: 16 May 1945 (aged 69); Oldenburg, Germany
- Occupation: Film actor
- Years active: 1934–1945 (film)

Fritz Hoopts (5 June 1875 – 16 May 1945) was a German stage and film actor.

== Selected filmography ==
- Trouble with Jolanthe (1934)
- The Girl from the Marsh Croft (1935)
- Frisians in Peril (1935)
- Uncle Bräsig (1936)
- When the Cock Crows (1936)
- Susanne in the Bath (1936)
- Heimweh (1937)
- Florentine (1937)
- Northern Lights (1938)
- Comrades at Sea (1938)
- Robert and Bertram (1939)
- My Daughter Doesn't Do That (1940)
- The Girl from Fano (1941)
- Venus on Trial (1941)
- Uncle Kruger (1941)
- Comrades (1941)
- Rembrandt (1942)
- Much Ado About Nixi (1942)
- That Was My Life (1944)
- Kolberg (1945)
- Elephant Fury (1953)
