= Paul Mederow =

German actor

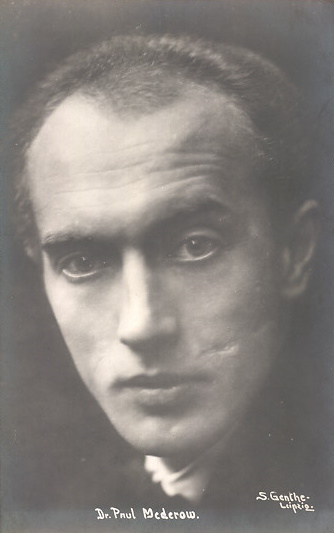
- Mederow c. 1918
- Born: Paul Friedrich Wolfgang Mederow; 30 June 1887; Stralsund, Pomerania, Prussia, Germany
- Died: 17 December 1974 (aged 87); Brissago, Ticino, Switzerland
- Occupation: Actor
- Years active: 1920-1951

Paul Friedrich Wolfgang Mederow (30 June 1887 – 17 December 1974) was a German stage and film actor.

Mederow was born in Stralsund, in the Prussian province of Pomerania and died at age 87 in Brissago, Ticino, Switzerland.

== Partial filmography ==
- Der verführte Heilige (1919)
- Panic in the House of Ardon (1920) as Alfons Ardon [Eventuell ist dies der Chemiker]
- Der siebente Tag (1920)
- Die Tophar-Mumie (1920)
- Tyrannei des Todes (1920) as Sanitätsrat Burow
- Fire in the Opera House (1930) as Munk
- 1914 (1931) as Edward Grey, 1st Viscount Grey of Fallodon
- M (1931) (uncredited)
- In the Employ of the Secret Service (1931)
- Typhoon (1933) as the president
- Ripening Youth (1933) as Dr. Stahnke, Lehrer
- Young Dessau's Great Love (1933) as Oberst Hall
- Hermine und die sieben Aufrechten (1935)
- Hundred Days (1935) as Grouchy
- The Bird Seller (1935)
- Artist Love (1935) as Professor Bergland
- Anschlag auf Schweda (1935) as Der Sanatoriumsarzt in Davos
- Trouble Backstairs (1935) as Magistrate Dr. Horn
- Augustus the Strong (1936) as Pöppelmann
- If We All Were Angels (1936) as District Judge
- Talking About Jacqueline (1937) as Musikprofessor
- Gewitterflug zu Claudia (1937) as Maxwell - Notar
- In the Name of the People (1939) as Jurist
- Passion (1940)
- Weißer Flieder (1940) as Dr. Jensen, Arzt
- The Fire Devil (1940) as General Rusca
- Jud Süß (1940) as Judge Ratner
- Counterfeiters (1940) as Tomaselli
- Kora Terry (1940) as a member of the commission of inquiry
- His Son (1942) as Der Gefängnisdirektor
- Wedding in Barenhof (1942) as the attorney
- The Golden Spider (1943)
- Doctor Praetorius (1950)
- Melody of Fate (1950)
- Man of Straw (1951) as Dr. Heuteuffel
- Father Is Being Stupid (1953) as the commissioner
- Der verzauberte Königssohn (1953)

== Bibliography ==
- Hardt, Usula. From Caligari to California: Erich Pommer's Life in the International Film Wars. Berghahn Books, 1996.
