= Roar of the Crowd =

1953 film

- Directed by: William Beaudine
- Written by: Charles R. Marion
- Produced by: Richard V. Heermance
- Starring: Howard Duff; Helene Stanley; Dave Willock; Minor Watson
- Cinematography: Harry Neumann
- Edited by: William Austin
- Music by: Marlin Skiles
- Production company: Monogram Pictures
- Distributed by: Monogram Pictures
- Release date: May 31, 1953
- Running time: 71 minutes
- Country: United States
- Language: English

Roar of the Crowd is a 1953 American sports film directed by William Beaudine and starring Howard Duff, Helene Stanley and Dave Willock. Race car drivers appear as in the film as themselves. The film was shot in cinecolor.

== Plot ==
An aspiring young racing driver is injured in his first Indianapolis 500, and is persuaded by his fiancée to give up the sport. But she eventually has a change of heart, permitting him to make a comeback.

== Cast ==
- Howard Duff as Johnny Tracy
- Helene Stanley as Marcy Parker
- Dave Willock as Buster Sands
- Louise Arthur as Rose Adams
- Minor Watson as Cyrus Mackey
- Harry Shannon as Sam "Pop" Tracy
- Don Haggerty as Chuck Baylor
- Edna Holland as Mrs. Atkinson
- Ray Walker as "Tuffy" Adams
- Paul Bryar as Max Bromski
- Larry Thor as An Announcer

== Bibliography ==
- Martin, Len D. The Allied Artists Checklist: The Feature Films and Short Subjects of Allied Artists Pictures Corporation, 1947-1978. McFarland & Company, 1993.
