= The Night Belongs to Us =

1929 German film

- Directed by: Carl Froelich; Henry Roussel
- Written by: Henry Kistemaeckers (play); Walter Reisch; Walter Supper
- Produced by: Carl Froelich
- Starring: Hans Albers; Charlotte Ander; Otto Wallburg; Walter Janssen
- Cinematography: Reimar Kuntze; Charles Métain
- Edited by: Wolfgang Loë-Bagier; Jean Oser
- Music by: Franz Grothe; Hanson Milde-Meissner
- Production company: Carl Froelich-Film
- Distributed by: Bild und Ton GmbH (Germany); Protex Pictures (US)
- Release dates: 23 December 1929 (Germany); 20 February 1931 (US)
- Running time: 110 minutes
- Country: Germany
- Language: German

The Night Belongs to Us (German: Die Nacht gehört uns), released in English as The Night Is Ours or The Night Belongs to Us, is a 1929 German sports romance sound film directed by Carl Froelich and Henry Roussel, and starring Hans Albers, Charlotte Ander, and Otto Wallburg.

== Production ==
The film was based on a 1925 play by Henry Kistemaeckers. Art direction was by Franz Schroedter. It was shot at the Tempelhof Studios. The film's exterior scenes were shot on location in Sicily on the course of the Targa Florio and at the AVUS racetrack in Berlin, and was one of the first German sound films to be released during the transition from silent to sound.

It used the Tri-Ergon sound-on-film process marketed through Tobis Film; the sound recording was supervised by de:Joseph Massolle, one of the inventors of Tri-Ergon, and de:Guido Bagier, who had been involved with sound films since 1925 when UFA's Das Mädchen mit den Schwefelhölzern (The Little Match Girl) met with technical failure at the première.

The Night Belongs to Us premiered at the Capitol am Zoo cinema, Berlin on 23 December 1929.

A separate French language version The Night Is Ours was also released, directed by Roger Lion.

== Cast ==
- Hans Albers as Harry Bredow
- Charlotte Ander as Bettina Bang
- Otto Wallburg as Vater Bang
- Walter Janssen as Herr Marten
- Ida Wüst as Dame der Gesellschaft
- Lucie Englisch as Dame der Gesellschaft
- Berthe Ostyn as Frau Bredow
- Julius Falkenstein as Lawyer
- Roberto Vittiglio
- Ilse Nast

== Bibliography ==
- Kreimeier, Klaus (1999). The Ufa Story: A History of Germany's Greatest Film Company, 1918–1945. Berkeley: University of California Press. ISBN 978-0-520-22069-0.
