= Love at First Sight (1932 film) =

1932 film directed by Carl Froelich

- German film poster
- German: Liebe auf den ersten Ton
- Directed by: Carl Froelich
- Written by: Heinrich Ilgenstein; Felix Jackson; C. Franz Landry; Walter Supper
- Starring: Carl Jöken; Lee Parry; Lico Suhrmann
- Cinematography: A. O. Weitzenberg
- Edited by: Oswald Hafenrichter; Gustav Lohse
- Music by: Hanson Milde-Meissner
- Production company: Carl Froelich-Film
- Distributed by: Werner Film-Verleih
- Release date: 17 November 1932
- Running time: 95 minutes
- Country: Germany
- Language: German

Love at First Sight (German: Liebe auf den ersten Ton) is a 1932 German comedy film directed by Carl Froelich and starring Carl Jöken, Lee Parry and Lico Suhrmann.

The film's sets were designed by the art director Franz Schroedter.

== Cast ==
- Carl Jöken as Rudolf Niemeyer
- Lee Parry as Hilde, wife
- Lico Suhrmann as Siegfried, their son
- Lizzi Waldmüller as Elisabeth, Duchess von Liebenstein
- Adele Sandrock as the Duchess's aunt
- Johannes Riemann as Prince Bernhard von Hassenstein
- Hans Leibelt as Count Prillwitz, director
- Arthur Mainzer as Prime Minister
- Karl Etlinger as Wartenberg, theater agent
- Rudolf Platte as Crammberg, Prince's adjutant
- Hugo Froelich as hotel doorman
- Lotte Holz as Elsa von Brabant

== See also ==
- Love at first sight
