= The Roundabouts of Handsome Karl =

1938 film directed by Carl Froelich

- German film poster
- German: Die Umwege des schönen Karl
- Directed by: Carl Froelich
- Written by: Paul Enderling; Harald Braun; Jacob Geis; Philipp Lothar Mayring; Klaus S. Richter
- Produced by: Herbert Engelsing; Carl Froelich
- Starring: Heinz Rühmann; Karin Hardt; Sybille Schmitz; Ernst Legal
- Cinematography: Reimar Kuntze
- Edited by: Gustav Lohse
- Music by: Hanson Milde-Meissner
- Production company: Carl Froelich Film
- Distributed by: Tobis Film
- Release date: 31 January 1938
- Running time: 101 minutes
- Country: Germany
- Language: German

The Roundabouts of Handsome Karl (German: Die Umwege des schönen Karl) is a 1938 German comedy film directed by Carl Froelich and starring Heinz Rühmann, Karin Hardt, and Sybille Schmitz. It portrays the experiences of a young waiter during the Great Depression.

== Partial cast ==
- Heinz Rühmann as Karl Kramer, waiter
- Karin Hardt as Grete Wernicke, daughter
- Sybille Schmitz as Lu Donon, daughter
- Ernst Legal as Der alte Albert, waiter
- Paul Westermeier as Otto Hübner, waiter
- Leo Peukert as Heinz Balzer, wine bar owner
- Albert Florath as Wernicke's father
- Margarete Kupfer as Tante Knifke
- Paul Bildt as Geheimrat Roderich Donon
- Claire Reigbert as Wernicke's mother
- Werner Finck as Herr von der Presse
- Karl Günther as Hoinken, racing team owner
- Kurt Seifert as Pferde-Wenzel
- Hugo Froelich as Spirituosenhersteller Neddebom
- Hansi Arnstaedt as Die Baronin
- Carl Heinz Charrell as Justizrat Siebenhütter
- Leopold von Ledebur as major
- Friedrich Honna as master baker
- Gea Eschenbach as singer
- Elisabeth Eygk as cashier's girlfriend
- Willy Krause as burned-out cashier
- Egon Brosig as coroner
- Ewald Wenck as detective commissioner
- Bruno Fritz as gentleman in hunter's hat
- Grete Wiedecke as Karl's landlady
- Wilhelm Bendow as cook
