= The Gasman =

1941 film directed by Carl Froelich

- Directed by: Carl Froelich
- Written by: Heinrich Spoerl
- Produced by: Carl Froelich
- Starring: Heinz Rühmann; Anny Ondra; Walter Steinbeck
- Cinematography: Reimar Kuntze
- Edited by: Gustav Lohse; Johanna Rosinski
- Music by: Hanson Milde-Meissner
- Production company: Tonfilmstudio Carl Froelich
- Distributed by: UFA
- Release date: 1 August 1941
- Running time: 85 minutes
- Country: Germany
- Language: German

The Gasman (German: Der Gasmann) is a 1941 German comedy film directed by Carl Froelich and starring Heinz Rühmann, Anny Ondra and Walter Steinbeck. It was shot at the Tempelhof Studios in Berlin and premiered in the city's Gloria-Palast. The film's sets were designed by Walter Haag. It was made by Froelich's separate production unit, and distributed by the major studio UFA.

== Cast ==
- Heinz Rühmann as Hermann Knittel
- Anny Ondra as Erika Knittel
- Walter Steinbeck as Herr - der nicht erkannt sein möchte
- Erika Helmke as Blondes Fräulein Lilott
- Will Dohm as Schwager Alfred
- Franz Weber as Judge
- Kurt Vespermann as Prosecutor
- Hans Leibelt as Defense lawyer
- Charlotte Susa as Schöne Zeugin
- Gisela Schlüter as Entzückende kleine Frau
- Herbert Bach as Kellner
- Luise Bethke-Zitzman as Knittels Nachbarin
- Paul Bildt as Nervenarzt Dr. Brauer
- Fritz Draeger as Mann im Zugabteil
- Paul Esser
- Hugo Froelich as Taxifahrer
- Wilhelm Große as Auskunftsbeamter
- Wolfgang Heise
- Bruno Hellwinkel as Polizeibeamter
- Otto Krieg-Helbig as Polizeibeamter
- Wilhelm P. Krüger as Flickschneider
- Walter Lieck as Bankdiener
- Manfred Meurer as Verdächtiger Jüngling
- Herta Neupert as Mopsgesicht
- Erik Radolf as Kriminalbeamter
- Marga Riffa as Beamtin der Sittenpolizei
- Rolf Rolphs as Polizeibeamter
- Max Rosenhauer
- Oscar Sabo as Pensionierter Schutzmann
- Ernst Stimmel as Bankdirektor
- Eleonore Tappert as Zimmervermieterin
- Eva Tinschmann as Frau Maschke
- Hans Ulrich as Bankangestellter
- Egon Vogel as Beamter für Verkehrsunfälle
- Ewald Wenck as Kriminalbeamter
- Hermine Ziegler as Frauenberaterin Janette Knoll
- Bruno Ziener as Vornehmer alter Herr
- Reinhard Kolldehoff as Polizeibeamter
- Kurt Seifert as Finanzbeamter
- Helmut Weiss as Romantischer Jüngling

== Bibliography ==
- Bock, Hans-Michael & Bergfelder, Tim. The Concise CineGraph. Encyclopedia of German Cinema. Berghahn Books, 2009.
