= Oscar Sabo =

Austrian actor

Oscar Sabo (29 August 1881, in Vienna – 2 May 1969, in West Berlin) was an Austrian actor.

== Selected filmography ==
- Jettatore (1919)
- The Jumping Jack (1930)
- The False Dimitri (1922)
- Storm in a Water Glass (1931)
- The Little Escapade (1931)
- The Spanish Fly (1931)
- A Night in Paradise (1932)
- Gitta Discovers Her Heart (1932)
- The Tsar's Diamond (1932)
- Things Are Getting Better Already (1932)
- Wedding at Lake Wolfgang (1933)
- The Marathon Runner (1933)
- Girls of Today (1933)
- Love Must Be Understood (1933)
- Roses from the South (1934)
- Tales from the Vienna Woods (1934)
- Fresh Wind from Canada (1935)
- Last Stop (1935)
- The Court Concert (1936)
- The Divine Jetta (1937)
- Steputat & Co. (1938)
- The Secret Lie (1938)
- New Year's Eve on Alexanderplatz (1938)
- The Deruga Case (1938)
- Heimatland (1939)
- Detours to Happiness (1939)
- Ursula Under Suspicion (1939)
- Twelve Minutes After Midnight (1939)
- Left of the Isar, Right of the Spree (1940)
- The Girl at the Reception (1940)
- Counterfeiters (1940)
- The Gasman (1941)
- The Way to Freedom (1941)
- Above All Else in the World (1941)
- Journey into the Past (1943)
- My Summer Companion (1943)
- The Buchholz Family (1944)
- Marriage of Affection (1944)
- Philharmonic (1944)
- Viennese Girls (1945)
- An Everyday Story (1948)
- When Men Cheat (1950)
- Three Girls Spinning (1950)
- Lady's Choice (1953)
- The Silent Angel (1954)
- The Three from the Filling Station (1955)
- Two Among Millions (1961)
- The Endless Night (1963)

== Bibliography ==
- Bergfelder, Tim & Bock, Hans-Michael. The Concise Cinegraph: Encyclopedia of German. Berghahn Books, 2009.
