= Ripening Youth (1933 film) =

- Directed by: Carl Froelich
- Written by: Max Dreyer (play); Robert A. Stemmle; Walter Supper
- Produced by: Carl Froelich
- Starring: Heinrich George; Peter Voß; Hertha Thiele
- Cinematography: Reimar Kuntze
- Edited by: Gustav Lohse
- Music by: Walter Gronostay
- Production company: Carl Froelich-Film
- Distributed by: Europa-Filmverleih
- Release date: 22 September 1933
- Running time: 115 minutes
- Country: Germany
- Language: German

Ripening Youth (German: Reifende Jugend) is a 1933 German drama film directed by Carl Froelich and starring Heinrich George, Peter Voß and Hertha Thiele.

The film's sets were designed by the art directors Karl Machus, Otto Moldenhauer and Franz Schroedter. Location shooting took place at Stralsund on the Baltic coast. It was well-received by the Nazi press on its release, and drew inspiration from the earlier Madchen in Uniform which was admired by film journalists of the Third Reich.

== Synopsis ==
When three girls transfer to an elite school in Lübeck so they can sit their upcoming university entrance examinations, this causes disruptions amongst the male students and teachers. One of the girls, Elfriede, becomes the subject of romantic interest from both a classmate and her strict teacher, ultimately opting for the latter. At the end all three girls pass their exams with full marks.

== Cast ==
- Heinrich George as Brodersen, Studiendirektor
- Peter Voß as Studienassesor Dr. Kerner
- Hertha Thiele as Elfriede Albing, Abiturientin
- Marieluise Claudius as Christa von Borck, Abiturientin
- Albert Lieven as Knud Sengebusch, Abiturient
- Paul Henckels as Dr. Hepp, Lehrer
- Albert Florath as Nehring, Musiklehrer
- Sabine Peters as Annelore Winkel, Abiturientin
- Rolf Kästner as Bert Fredereksen, Abiturient
- Carsta Löck as Stine Nockelmann, Tochter des Hausmeister
- Herbert Hübner as Dr. Albing
- Paul Mederow as Dr. Stahnke, Lehrer
- Julius E. Herrmann as Dr. Steffenhagen, Lehrer
- Hermann Noack as Fritz Hannemann, Abiturient
- Jochen Kuhlmey as Walter Mettke, Klassen-Primus
- Horst Beck as Karl Maier, Abiturient
- Hans Engelhardt as Willi Holzhüter, Abiturient
- Dieter Horn as Franz Möller, Abiturient
- Friedrich Karl as Erwin Pape, Quintaner
- Hugo Froelich as Nockelmann, Hausmeister
- Anneliese Würtz as Frau Nockelmann
- Else Bötticher as Frau Albing
- Fritz Reiff as Herr Sengebusch
- Nany Mangelsdorf as Frau Mettke
- Ellen Geyer as Dienstmädchen bei Dr. Kerner
- Jochen Blume as Andreas Bolz, Abiturient
- H.J. Wieland as Otto Ohlerich, Abiturient
- Herbert Stockder as Herrmann Puttbrese, Abiturient
- Andree Hanfmann as Ernst Rauch, Abiturient

== Reception ==
Writing for The Spectator in 1936, Graham Greene described the film as entertaining and praised the film's charmingly realistic characterization of both German school masters and their pupils. Greene highlighted the "light lyrical treatment of some of the scenes", adding that while "unsentimental, [the film is] not unkindly [in its depiction] of emotional awkwardness."

== Bibliography ==
- Heins, Laura. Nazi Film Melodrama. University of Illinois Press, 2013.
