= Three Girls Spinning =

1950 film directed by Carl Froelich

- Directed by: Carl Froelich
- Written by: Gustav Lohse; Fedor von Zobeltitz (novel)
- Produced by: Hermann Brüning
- Starring: Albrecht Schoenhals; Adelheid Seeck; Axel von Ambesser
- Cinematography: Bruno Stephan
- Edited by: Liselotte Cochius
- Music by: Hanson Milde-Meissner
- Production company: Carl Froelich-Film
- Distributed by: Neue Filmverleih
- Release date: 27 October 1950
- Running time: 110 minutes
- Country: West Germany
- Language: German

Three Girls Spinning (German: Drei Mädchen spinnen) is a 1950 West German comedy film directed by Carl Froelich and starring Albrecht Schoenhals, Adelheid Seeck and Axel von Ambesser. It was shot at the Tempelhof Studios in Berlin. The film's sets were designed by the art director Erich Kettelhut.

== Cast ==
- Albrecht Schoenhals as Eduard Amberg
- Adelheid Seeck as Magda Amberg
- Axel von Ambesser as Professor Hartwig
- Georg Thomalla as Bollmann
- Renate Barken as Beate Amberg
- Maria Körber as Elfriede Amberg
- Susanne Körber-Harlan as Maxi Amberg
- Harald Juhnke as Pfarrer Krempel
- Otto Gebühr as Lehmann
- Bully Buhlan as Singer
- Oscar Sabo as Briefträger
- Agnes Windeck as Wirtschafterin

== Bibliography ==
- Bock, Hans-Michael & Bergfelder, Tim. The Concise Cinegraph: Encyclopaedia of German Cinema. Berghahn Books, 2009.
