= Marianne Hoppe =

German actress (1909–2002)

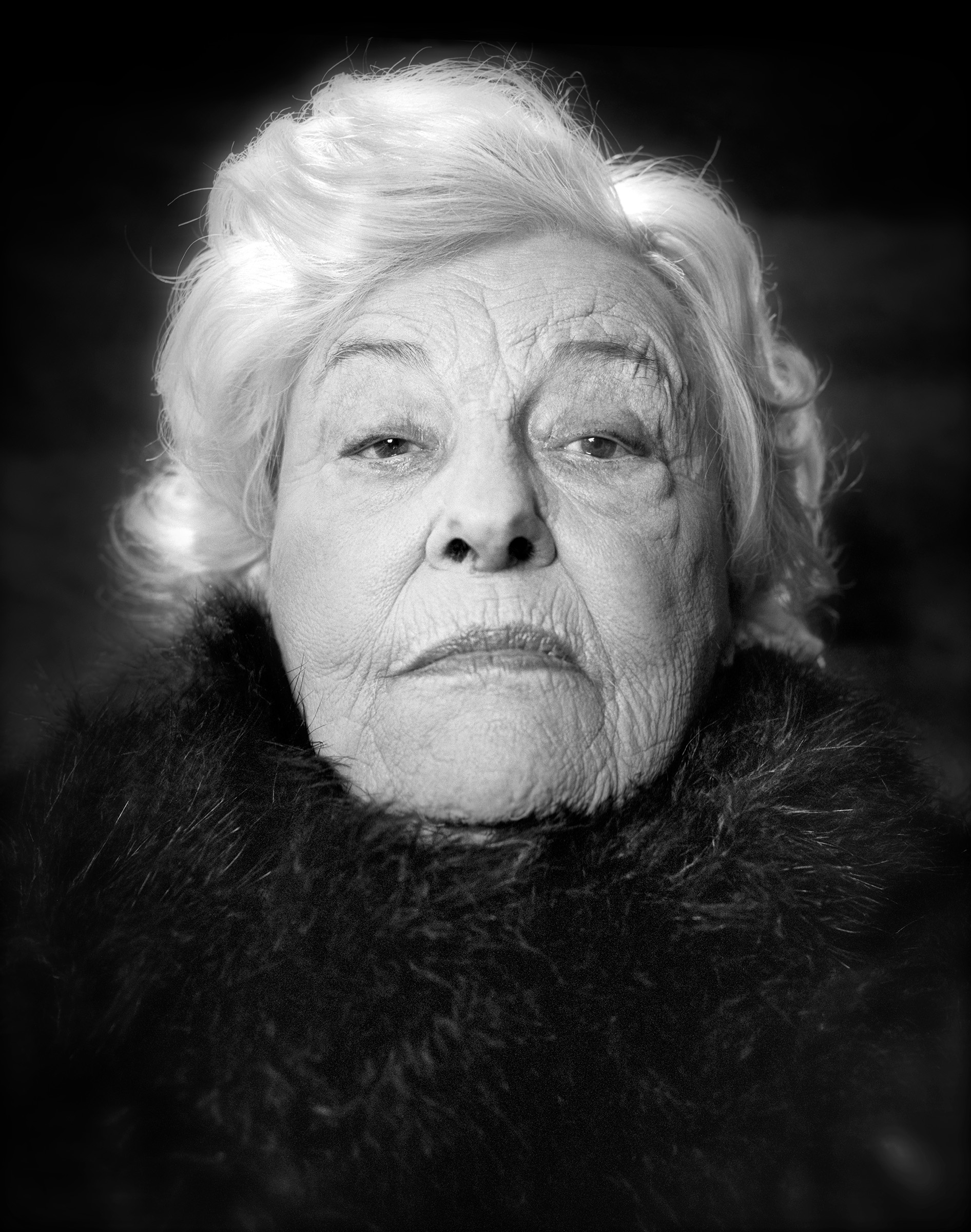
- Marianne Hoppe photographed by Oliver Mark, Berlin 2001
- Born: Marianne Stefanie Paula Henni Gertrud Hoppe; 26 April 1909; Rostock, Mecklenburg-Schwerin, Germany
- Died: 23 October 2002 (aged 93); Siegsdorf, Bavaria, Germany
- Occupation: Actress
- Years active: 1933–1991
- Spouse: Gustaf Gründgens (1936–1946; divorced)
- Partner: Thomas Bernhard
- Children: 1

Marianne Hoppe (26 April 1909 – 23 October 2002) was a German theatre and film actress.

== Life and work ==
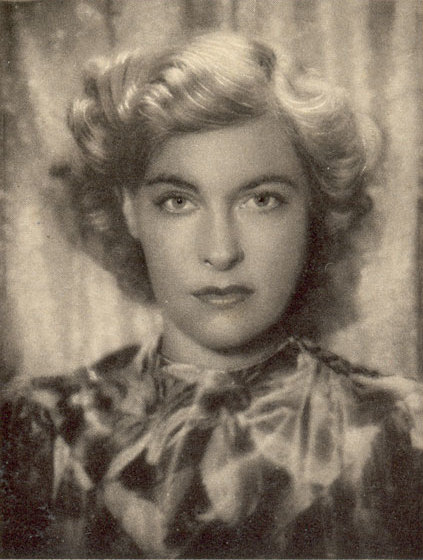
Hoppe in 1935

Born in Rostock, Hoppe became a leading lady of stage and films in Germany. She was born into a wealthy landowning family and was initially privately educated on her father's private estate. Later she attended school in Berlin and in Weimar, where she began to attend theatre.

Hoppe first performed at 17 as a member of Berlin's Deutsches Theater under director Max Reinhardt. In 1935 she was hired by the controversial German actor and Director of the Prussian State Theatre under the Third Reich, Gustaf Gründgens. They were married from 1936 to 1946, until their divorce. Speaking years after the marriage had ended Hoppe stated, "He was my love, but never my great love, that was work."

One of the characters in the film Mephisto was reportedly based on her. Hoppe made no secret of her contacts with the Nazi elite in the 1930s/40s, including being invited to dinner by Hitler. Her role in Der Schimmelreiter (The Rider of the White Horse, 1934) made her famous almost overnight, while her "Aryan" face made her a darling of the Nazi elite. Later Hoppe would label this period of her life as "the black page in my golden book".

During her time acting at the home of the Prussian State Theatre, the Schauspielhaus, Hoppe developed her analytical approach to acting, which she stated consisted in her "taking apart every sentence" and giving the use of language a brilliance. This method was to be associated with Hoppe throughout her working life. In 1946 her only child, Benedikt Johann Percy Gründgens, was born. Even after their divorce in May 1946, Marianne Hoppe—who had been in relationships with Therese Giehse after the war and with Anni Mewes in the 1970s—remained close to Gustaf Gründgens until his death in October 1963.

Four years later after her divorce from Gründgens, Hoppe had a great success as Blanche Dubois in Tennessee Williams's A Streetcar Named Desire, and increasingly played avant-garde roles, written by authors such as Heiner Müller (Quartett, 1994) and Thomas Bernhard, who became her partner in private life as well. She became a favourite of the young and iconoclastic directors Claus Peymann, Robert Wilson and Frank Castorf.

== Death ==
Hoppe died in Siegsdorf, Bavaria, in 2002 from natural causes, aged 93. "German theater has lost its queen", said Claus Peymann of the Berliner Ensemble, whose theatre featured Hoppe's last performance, in Bertolt Brecht's Resistible Rise of Arturo Ui, in December 1997. In one of her last interviews Hoppe stated, "I have a go at happiness every day. That takes discipline, a virtue every halfway decent actor should have."

== Awards ==
- 1987 Bavarian Film Awards, Best Actress
- 1996 Bavarian Film Awards, Honorary Award

== Partial filmography ==
- The Judas of Tyrol (1933) - Josefa
- The Country Schoolmaster (1933) - Ursula Diewen
- The Rider on the White Horse (1934) - Elke
- Trouble with Jolanthe (1934) - Anna, her daughter
- Schwarzer Jäger Johanna (1934) - Johanna Luerssen
- Alles hört auf mein Kommando (1935) - Hella Bergson
- Sergeant Schwenke (1935) - Maria Schönborn, saleswoman at Floris flower shop
- Die Werft zum Grauen Hecht (1935) - Käthe Liebenow
- Anschlag auf Schweda (1935) - Regine Kessler
- When the Cock Crows (1936) - Marie
- A Woman of No Importance (1936) - Hester
- The Ruler (1937) - Inken Peters
- Capers (1937) - Mabel Atkinson
- Gabriele: eins, zwei, drei (1937) - Gabriele Brodersen
- The False Step (1939) - Effi Briest
- Congo Express (1939) - Renate Brinkmann
- Goodbye, Franziska (1941) - Franziska Tiemann
- Voice of the Heart (1942) - Felicitas Iversen
- Romance in a Minor Key (1943) - Madeleine
- I Need You (1944) - Julia Bach
- Das Leben geht weiter (1945) - Lenore Carius
- The Lost Face (1948) - Johanna Stegen
- Second Hand Destiny (1949) - Irene Scholz
- Only One Night (1950) - Die Frau
- The Man of My Life (1954) - Helga Dargatter
- Thirteen Old Donkeys (1958) - Martha Krapp
- The Strange Countess (1961) - Mary Pinder, née Moron
- Treasure of Silver Lake (1962) - Mrs. Butler
- Massacre at Marble City (1964) - Mrs. Brendel
- Ten Little Indians (1965) - Frau Grohmann
- Der Tod läuft hinterher (1967, TV miniseries) - Madame Brassac
- The Wrong Move (1975) - Mutter
- Marianne und Sophie (1983) - Marianne
- Francesca (1987)
- Bei Thea (1988, TV film) - Thea Ammer
- Schloß Königswald (1988) - Gräfin Hohenlohe
- Tassilo (1991, TV series) - Maximiliane
- Death Came As a Friend (1991, TV film) - Frau Weinstein (final film role)
