= Wilhelm P. Krüger =

German actor

- Born: 29 August 1883; German Empire
- Died: 12 July 1959 (aged 75); Hörnum, Schleswig-Holstein, Hesse, West Germany
- Occupation: Actor
- Years active: 1930–1953 (film)

Wilhelm P. Krüger (29 August 1883 – 12 July 1959) was a German stage and film actor.

== Selected filmography ==
- Flachsmann the Educator (1930)
- Trouble with Jolanthe (1934)
- Every Day Isn't Sunday (1935)
- When the Cock Crows (1936)
- My Friend Barbara (1937)
- Don't Promise Me Anything (1937)
- The Divine Jetta (1937)
- Autobus S (1937)
- White Slaves (1937)
- You and I (1938)
- The Four Companions (1938)
- Cadets (1939)
- Target in the Clouds (1939)
- Bismarck (1940)
- The Gasman (1941)
- The Girl from Fano (1941)
- Carl Peters (1941)
- Her Other Self (1941)
- The Way to Freedom (1941)
- The Night in Venice (1942)
- Bismarck's Dismissal (1942)
- Secret File W.B.1 (1942)
- Elephant Fury (1953)

== Bibliography ==
- Chandler, Charlotte. Ingrid: Ingrid Bergman, A Personal Biography. Simon and Schuster, 2007.
