= Helene Stanley =

American actress (1929–1990)

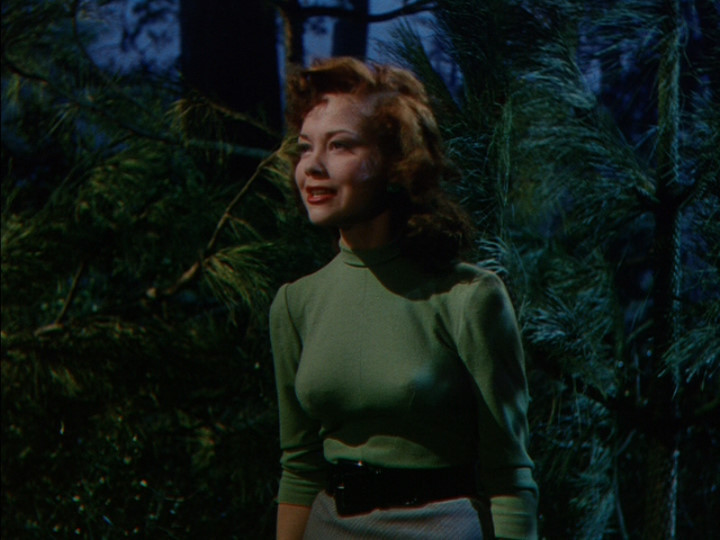
- Stanley in The Snows of Kilimanjaro (1952)
- Born: Dolores Diane Freymouth; July 17, 1929; Gary, Indiana, U.S.
- Died: December 27, 1990 (aged 61); Los Angeles, California, U.S.
- Other name: Dolores Diane
- Occupation: Actress
- Years active: 1942–1961
- Spouses: Johnny Stompanato (m. 1953; div. 1955) David Niemetz (m. 1959; died 1990)
- Children: 1

Helene Stanley (born Dolores Diane Freymouth; July 17, 1929 – December 27, 1990) was an American actress who was the live model for Cinderella, Aurora in Sleeping Beauty, and Anita Radcliffe in One Hundred and One Dalmatians.

== Early life ==
Stanley was born in Gary, Indiana. Her parents were Michael Freymouth, who was an acrobat who worked in Europe, and Gerty Freymouth (née Seigert). She spent most of her childhood in southern California.

At the age of four, she won the World's Fair Contests of Contests in Chicago as an acrobatic dancer, winning a $25 prize.

== Career ==
Stanley used the stage name "Dolores Diane." In 1946, she received a contract with Metro-Goldwyn-Mayer and began to use the stage name "Helene Stanley," with one of her most notable appearances being a brief role in John Huston's The Asphalt Jungle (1950).

Her collaboration with Disney started around 1948. She became the live-action model for both the main character and one of the stepsisters Anastasia Tremaine in Cinderella, Aurora in Sleeping Beauty, and Anita Radcliffe in One Hundred and One Dalmatians. In the season three episode of Walt Disney's Disneyland (1957), Tricks of Our Trade, Stanley appears as herself performing a ballet routine for several studio animation directors animating scenes from the Dance of the Hours segment of Fantasia.

== Personal life ==
Helene Stanley was married to Johnny Stompanato on January 17, 1953, with their divorce dated February 10, 1955.

After Stompanato, Stanley married a physician from Beverly Hills, David Niemetz. They had a son, David Niemetz Jr., in 1961. After they were married, Stanley formally retired from show business in 1962, one year after the birth of her son.

== Death ==
Stanley died on December 27, 1990, in Los Angeles of ovarian cancer.

== Filmography ==
- 1942: Girls' Town - Sally
- 1943: Hi, Buddy - Specialty
- 1943: Moonlight in Vermont - A Jivin' Jill
- 1945: Patrick the Great - Member, Jivin' Jills (uncredited)
- 1945: Thrill of a Romance - Susan
- 1946: Holiday in Mexico - Yvette Baranga
- 1947: Brick Bradford - Carol Preston
- 1948: My Dear Secretary - Miss 'Clay' Pidgeon (uncredited)
- 1949: Mr. Soft Touch - Donna (uncredited)
- 1949: Bandit King of Texas - Cynthia Turner
- 1949: All the King's Men - Helene Hale (uncredited)
- 1950: Cinderella (As live-action model for Disney animators to use as a guide) (Cinderella and Anastasia Tremaine)
- 1950: A Woman of Distinction - Minor Role (uncredited)
- 1950: The Asphalt Jungle - Jeannie - Girl in Diner (uncredited)
- 1952: Diplomatic Courier - Airline Stewardess
- 1952: Wait till the Sun Shines, Nellie - Eadie Jordan
- 1952: We're Not Married! - Mary (uncredited)
- 1952: Dreamboat - Mimi
- 1952: The Snows of Kilimanjaro - Connie
- 1953: Roar of the Crowd - Marcy Parker
- 1953: Once I Will Return - Gloria
- 1954: Carnival Story - Peggy
- 1954: Circus of Love - Lore
- 1955: Davy Crockett, King of the Wild Frontier - Polly Crockett (archive footage)
- 1955: Dial Red O - Connie Wyatt
- 1957: Walt Disney's Disneyland Tricks of Our Trade - Herself
- 1959: Sleeping Beauty (As live-action model for Disney animators to use as a guide) - Aurora
- 1959: Perry Mason The Case of the Foot-Loose Doll" - Fran Driscoll
- 1961: One Hundred and One Dalmatians (As live-action model for Disney animators to use as a guide) - Anita
