= The Hunter from Kurpfalz =

1933 film

- Directed by: Carl Behr
- Written by: Carl Behr
- Produced by: Carl Froelich
- Starring: Hans Adalbert Schlettow; Walter Rilla; Fritz Kampers
- Cinematography: Herbert Körner
- Music by: Hanson Milde-Meissner
- Production company: Carl Froelich-Film
- Distributed by: Europa Film
- Release date: 20 December 1933
- Running time: 82 minutes
- Country: Germany
- Language: German

The Hunter from Kurpfalz (German: Der Jäger aus Kurpfalz) is a 1933 German comedy film directed by Carl Behr and starring Hans Adalbert Schlettow, Walter Rilla and Fritz Kampers. It was produced by Carl Froelich and shot at the Johannisthal Studios of Tobis Film in Berlin. Location shooting took place around Neustadt in the Palatinate and the wider Rhineland area. The title references the German folk song "Ein Jäger aus Kurpfalz".

== Cast ==
- Hans Adalbert Schlettow as Baron Axel von Hollperg, Gutsherr
- Walter Rilla as Baron Hans, sein Bruder, Buchhändler
- Fritz Kampers as Jakob Haringer, Gutsverwalter
- Karl Braun as Ebers, Förster auf Hollperg
- Hermann Braun as Jupp, Försterjunge
- Paul Henckels as Der alte Leuschner
- Edith Linn as Annie, seine Tochter
- Ilse Rose-Vollborn as Fränze, seine Tochter
- Theo Lingen as Schröder
- Eduard Bornträger as Franz, ein Diener

== Bibliography ==
- Aurich, Rolf & Jacobsen, Wolfgang . Theo Lingen: das Spiel mit der Maske : Biographie. Aufbau, 2008.
- Bock, Hans-Michael & Bergfelder, Tim. The Concise Cinegraph: Encyclopaedia of German Cinema. Berghahn Books, 2009.
- Klaus, Ulrich J. Deutsche Tonfilme: Jahrgang 1933. Klaus-Archiv, 1988.
