= Barnabás von Géczy =

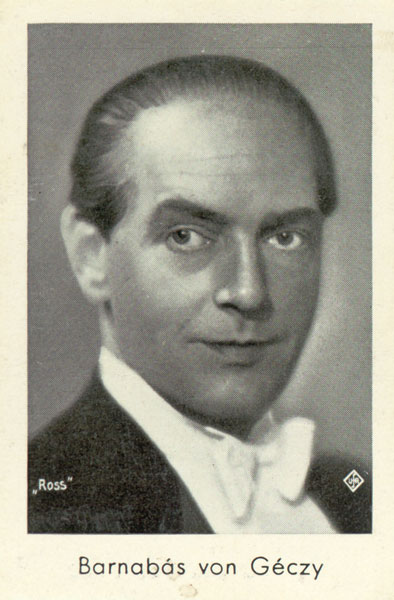

Background information
- Born: 4 March 1897; Budapest, Austria-Hungary
- Died: 2 July 1971 (aged 74) Munich, West Germany
- Occupations: Bandleader, composer
- Instrument: Violin

Barnabás von Géczy (4 March 1897 – 2 July 1971) was a Hungarian violinist, composer and bandleader.

== Biography ==
von Géczy was born in Budapest, and studied at the Budapest Academy of Music. After World War I, he left Hungary and found work as a violinist in Trondheim, Norway before settling in Berlin in 1924; von Géczy also received offers from the Royal Swedish Opera in Stockholm and the Philadelphia Opera (then led by Leopold Stokowski), but turned them down.

From 1925 to 1937 von Géczy's orchestra had a long term engagement at the Hotel Esplanade in Berlin. He soon arose as one of Europe's most popular bandleaders, and also appeared in films such as This One or None and The Countess of Monte Cristo. As the classically trained von Géczy favored strings over reeds and brass, he became a favorite of Hitler and Goebbels and continued his career in the Third Reich. His orchestra performed at the Volksbühne in Berlin in 1933–1934, and von Géczy was invested with the title of "Professor" by Hitler in 1939.

After the fall of the Third Reich, von Géczy was banned from performing for a few years. In 1952, he formed a new orchestra at the Café Luitpold in Munich, a city in which he would live until his death.
