= Fire in the Opera House =

1930 film directed by Carl Froelich

- Directed by: Carl Froelich
- Written by: Walter Reisch; Walter Supper
- Produced by: Carl Froelich
- Starring: Alexa Engström; Gustav Fröhlich; Gustaf Gründgens
- Cinematography: Reimar Kuntze; Fritz Arno Wagner
- Music by: Hanson Milde-Meissner
- Production company: Carl Froelich-Film
- Release date: 14 October 1930
- Running time: 104 minutes
- Country: Germany
- Language: German

Fire in the Opera House (1930)

Fire in the Opera House (German: Brand in der Oper) is a 1930 German drama film directed by Carl Froelich and starring Alexa Engström, Gustav Fröhlich and Gustaf Gründgens. A separate French-language version, La barcarolle d'amour, was also produced. It was shot at the Babelsberg Studios in Berlin. The film's sets were designed by the art director Franz Schroedter.

== Cast ==
- Alexa Engström as Floriane Bach
- Gustav Fröhlich as Richard Faber
- Gustaf Gründgens as Otto van Lingen
- Gertrud Arnold as Frau Konsul van Lingen
- Marianne Fröhlich as Ilse van Lingen
- Hans Peppler as Der Theaterdirektor
- Julius Falkenstein as Löwenthal, Kassierer
- Arthur Kistenmacher as Der alte Korrepetitor
- Paul Mederow as Munk, erster Kapellmeister
- Aenne Goerling as Anna Riehl, Sängerin
- Ilse Nast as Berta Kranz, Choristin
- Hadrian Maria Netto
- Sophie Pagay
- Erich Kober
- Bruno Hoenscherle
- Art Winkler
- Arthur Bergen
- Marcel Merminod
- Franz Verdier
- Adolf Schroeder
- Willy Kaiser-Heyl
- Jarmila Novotná as Die Primadonna
- Irmgard Groß as Nikolaus
- Hendrik Appels as Titelpartie in 'Tannhäuser'
- Paul Rehkopf as Landgraf in 'Tannhäuser'
- Gerhard Vöge as Wolfram von Eschenbach in 'Tannhäuser'
- Werner Engels as Biterolf in 'Tannhäuser'
- Chor der Staatsoper Berlin as Chor

== Bibliography ==
- Goble, Alan (1999). The Complete Index to Literary Sources in Film. Walter de Gruyter. ISBN 978-3-11-095194-3.
