= Hanson Milde-Meissner =

German composer (1899–1983)

Hansom Milde-Meissner
- Born: 1 April 1899; Habelschwerdt, German Empire
- Died: 13 July 1983 (aged 84); Baden-Baden, West Germany
- Other names: Johannes Paul Friedrich Milde; Hansom Milde-Meißner
- Occupation: Composer
- Years active: 1929–1959 (film)

Hansom Milde-Meissner (1 April 1899, in Habelschwerdt – 14 July 1983, in Baden-Baden) was a German composer of film scores. He began working on films in 1929 at the beginning of the sound era and was active for the next three decades, particularly during the Weimar and Nazi periods.

== Selected filmography ==
- The Night Belongs to Us (1929)
- There Is a Woman Who Never Forgets You (1930)
- The Night Is Ours (1930)
- Hans in Every Street (1930)
- Fire in the Opera House (1930)
- Mädchen in Uniform (1931)
- Louise, Queen of Prussia (1931)
- This One or None (1932)
- Love at First Sight (1932)
- Gitta Discovers Her Heart (1932)
- Life Begins Tomorrow (1933)
- The Hunter from Kurpfalz (1933)
- Trouble with Jolanthe (1934)
- I for You, You for Me (1934)
- Sergeant Schwenke (1935)
- When the Cock Crows (1936)
- The Dreamer (1936)
- If We All Were Angels (1936)
- The Roundabouts of Handsome Karl (1938)
- The Four Companions (1938)
- Yvette (1938)
- Shoulder Arms (1939)
- The Gasman (1941)
- Alarm (1941)
- I'll Carry You in My Arms (1943)
- No Place for Love (1947)
- Three Girls Spinning (1950)
- Ripening Youth (1955)

== Bibliography ==
- Giesen, Rolf. Nazi Propaganda Films: A History and Filmography. McFarland & Company, 2003.
