= Such Great Foolishness =

- German film poster
- German: Die ganz großen Torheiten
- Directed by: Carl Froelich
- Written by: Marianne von Angern (novel); Erwin Heß
- Produced by: Carl Froelich
- Starring: Paula Wessely; Rudolf Forster; Hilde Wagener; Gustav Waldau
- Cinematography: Franz Planer
- Edited by: Gustav Lohse
- Music by: Ralph Benatzky
- Production company: Carl Froelich Filmproduktion
- Distributed by: Tobis Europa; Tobis-Sascha (Austria)
- Release date: 30 April 1937
- Running time: 95 minutes
- Country: Nazi Germany
- Language: German

Such Great Foolishness (German: Die ganz großen Torheiten) is a 1937 German drama film directed by Carl Froelich and starring Paula Wessely, Rudolf Forster and Hilde Wagener. The film was set in Vienna, unusually for a German film of the time which had increasingly cut back on films set in Austria since the Nazi takeover of 1933. The film was based on a novel by Marianne von Angern.

It was shot at the Sievering Studios in Vienna and the Tempelhof Studios in Berlin.

== Cast ==
- Paula Wessely as Therese Brandl
- Rudolf Forster as Dr. Alexander Dahlen
- Hilde Wagener as Irene von Baldaß - journalist
- Gustav Waldau as Count Hoyer
- Hedwig Bleibtreu as Countess Hoyer
- Egon von Jordan as Baron Gigi, nephew
- Bruno Hübner as valet in the house of Hoyer
- Hans Olden as Redl - Dahlen's secretary
- Gretl Theimer as Fritzi
- Karl Hellmer as concierge at the hotel 'Stern'
- Georges Boulanger as Zigeunerprimas: Violin
- Kurt Meisel as Specht - broadcast announcer
- Liesl Eckardt
- Grete Kaiser
- Klaus Pohl
- Margarete Schön
- Paul Wagner
- Traute Alpenburg
- Wilhelm Berling
- Julius Brandt
- Angelo Ferrari
- Edmund Firsbach
- Hella Gantzert
- Max Gerhardt
- Richard Godai
- Ellen Gutschmidt
- Karl Harbacher
- Hans Henninger
- Charlie Albert Huber
- Gerti Kammerzell
- Käthe Kroker
- Jochen Kuhlmey
- Harry Kupetz
- Helmut Lang
- Manfred Meurer
- Leo Reiter
- Margarethe Reiter
- Ellen Rüegg
- Alfred Schwarz
- Annemarie Schäfer
- Gert Scott-Iversen
- Hanns Waschatko
- Edi Winterfeldt
