= If We All Were Angels (1936 film) =

1936 film directed by Carl Froelich

- Directed by: Carl Froelich
- Written by: Heinrich Spoerl (novel and screenplay)
- Produced by: Friedrich Pflughaupt; Carl Froelich
- Starring: Heinz Rühmann; Leny Marenbach; Lotte Rausch
- Cinematography: Reimar Kuntze
- Edited by: Gustav Lohse
- Music by: Hanson Milde-Meissner
- Production company: Carl Froelich-Film
- Distributed by: Europa Film
- Release date: 9 October 1936
- Running time: 99 minutes
- Country: Germany
- Language: German

If We All Were Angels (German: Wenn wir alle Engel wären) is a 1936 German comedy film directed by Carl Froelich and starring Heinz Rühmann, Leny Marenbach and Lotte Rausch. The overall plot was similar to that of The Virtuous Sinner (1931) which Rühmann had also appeared in. It was made at the former National Studios in Berlin while location filming took place around Cologne. The film's sets were designed by the art director Franz Schroedter. It was re-released in 1950 by Herzog Film.

== Synopsis ==
A respectable member of provincial German society nearly becomes involved in a scandal following a series of misunderstandings.

== Cast ==
- Heinz Rühmann as Christian Kempenich
- Leny Marenbach as Hedwig - seine Frau
- Elsa Dalands as Selma Kempenich - die Tante
- Lotte Rausch as Maria, the maid
- Harald Paulsen as Enrico Falotti - Gesangslehrer
- Hanns August Herten as Bügermeister
- Charlotte Krause-Walter as Else
- Carl de Vogt as Hotel Porter 'Waldfrieden'
- Will Dohm as Police Inspector
- Paul Mederow as District Judge
- Ernst Waldow as Prosecution lawyer
- Hugo Froelich as Justizrat Genius - Defence lawyer
- Luise Morland as Frau Oberpostdirektor

== Bibliography ==
- Hake, Sabine (2001). Popular Cinema of the Third Reich. University of Texas Press. ISBN 978-0-292-73458-6.
