= Once I Will Return =

1953 film directed by Géza von Bolváry

- German film poster
- German: Einmal kehr' ich wieder
- Directed by: Géza von Bolváry
- Written by: Ernst Nebhut; Herbert Reinecker; Just Scheu
- Produced by: Günter Matern
- Starring: Paul Dahlke; Helene Stanley; Adelheid Seeck
- Cinematography: Ted Kornowicz; Herbert Körner; Ivan Marincek
- Edited by: Hermann Ludwig
- Music by: Bojan Adamic
- Production companies: Deutsche Film Hansa; Triglav Film
- Distributed by: Allianz Filmverleih
- Release date: 26 November 1953
- Running time: 96 minutes
- Countries: West Germany; Yugoslavia
- Language: German

Once I Will Return or Dalmatian Wedding (German: Einmal kehr' ich wieder) is a 1953 German-Yugoslav comedy film directed by Géza von Bolváry and starring Paul Dahlke, Helene Stanley, and Adelheid Seeck. A millionaire returns from the United States to his native Dubrovnik.

== Cast ==
- Paul Dahlke as John Rick
- Helene Stanley as Gloria
- Adelheid Seeck as Countess Stella Monti
- Pero Alexander as Count Pero Monti
- Elma Karlowa as Marina
- Heinz Drache as Bob Emerson
- Egon von Jordan as Mome
- Iván Petrovich as Ruge
- Vickie Henderson as stewardess Mary
- Pat Chico as cook
- Hans Hais as 1. creditor
- Lojze Potokar as 2. creditor
- Viktor Beck as fisherman Josip
- Das Jugoslawische National-Ensemble Zagreb as Dancers
