= This One or None =

1932 film directed by Carl Froelich

- Directed by: Carl Froelich
- Written by: Johannes Brandt; Walter Supper
- Produced by: Carl Froelich
- Starring: Gitta Alpar; Max Hansen; Ferdinand von Alten
- Cinematography: Curt Courant
- Edited by: Hanson Milde-Meissner
- Music by: Felicien Alpar David; Tibor Alpar; Otto Stransky
- Production company: Carl Froelich Filmproduktion
- Distributed by: Metropol-Filmverleih
- Release date: 26 September 1932
- Running time: 91 minutes
- Country: Germany
- Language: German

This One or None (German: Die - oder keine) is a 1932 German musical film directed by Carl Froelich and starring Gitta Alpar, Max Hansen and Ferdinand von Alten. It is part of the tradition of operetta films. It was shot at the Johannisthal Studios in Berlin. The film's sets were designed by the art director Franz Schroedter. Location shooting took place around Berlin at the Brandenburg Gate, Potsdamer Platz and Unter den Linden.

== Cast ==
- Gitta Alpar as Eva Petri
- Max Hansen as Prince Michael von Marana
- Ferdinand von Alten as Prince Wenzel von Marana
- Paul Otto as Ravel, Bankier
- Fritz Fischer as Florian, Tenor
- Paul Henckels as Montalon, Michaels Adjutant
- Rudolf Platte as Officer
- Wolfgang von Schwindt as Ein Bassist
- Erich Fuchs as Ein Bariton
- Lucy Malata as Eine Altastin
- Barnabás von Géczy as Primgeiger
- Comedian Harmonists as Themselves

== Bibliography ==
- Bock, Hans-Michael & Bergfelder, Tim. The Concise Cinegraph: Encyclopaedia of German Cinema. Berghahn Books, 2009.
- Klaus, Ulrich J. Deutsche Tonfilme: Jahrgang 1932. Klaus-Archiv, 1988.
