= Bruno Hübner =

Austrian actor (1899–1983)

- Born: 26 August 1899; Langenbruck, Bohemia, Austro-Hungarian Empire
- Died: 22 December 1983 (aged 84); Munich, Bavaria, West Germany
- Occupation: Actor
- Years active: 1933 - 1983 (film)

Bruno Hübner (26 August 1899–22 December 1983) was an Austrian film and television actor known for his work in Germany. He was born in Reichenberg then in the Austro-Hungarian Empire, which later became part of Czechoslovakia.

== Selected filmography ==
- Punks Arrives from America (1935)
- Under Blazing Heavens (1936)
- A Wedding Dream (1936)
- Patriots (1937)
- The Broken Jug (1937)
- Such Great Foolishness (1937)
- The Mountain Calls (1938)
- Maria Ilona (1939)
- The Green Emperor (1939)
- The Wedding Trip (1939)
- New Year's Eve on Alexanderplatz (1939)
- Falstaff in Vienna (1940)
- Judgement Day (1940)
- Bismarck (1940)
- The Rothschilds (1940)
- The Fox of Glenarvon (1940)
- Counterfeiters (1940)
- The Waitress Anna (1941)
- The Rainer Case (1942)
- Nora (1944)
- The Millionaire (1947)
- The Lost Face (1948)
- Friday the Thirteenth (1949)
- Doctor Praetorius (1950)
- A Devil of a Woman (1951)
- My Name is Niki (1952)
- The Great Temptation (1952)
- Knall and Fall as Detectives (1953)
- Fanfare of Marriage (1953)
- A Girl from Paris (1954)
- Annie from Tharau (1954)
- The Missing Miniature (1954)
- The Flying Classroom (1954)
- Holiday in Tyrol (1956)
- The Last Ones Shall Be First (1957)
- You Don't Shoot at Angels (1960)
- Love Has to Be Learned (1963)
- Don't Get Angry (1972)
- Lulu (1980)

== Bibliography ==
- Goble, Alan. The Complete Index to Literary Sources in Film. Walter de Gruyter, 1999.
