= Mädchen in Uniform =

1931 German film by Leontine Sagan

- US VHS cover
- Directed by: Leontine Sagan
- Screenplay by: Christa Winsloe; Friedrich Dammann
- Based on: Gestern und heute by Christa Winsloe
- Produced by: Carl Froelich
- Starring: Hertha Thiele; Dorothea Wieck
- Cinematography: Reimar Kuntze; Franz Weihmayr
- Edited by: Oswald Hafenrichter
- Music by: Hanson Milde-Meissner
- Production company: Deutsche Film-Gemeinschaft
- Distributed by: Bild und Ton GmbH
- Release date: 27 November 1931
- Running time: 88 minutes
- Country: Weimar Republic
- Language: German

Mädchen in Uniform ("Girls in Uniform") is a 1931 German romantic drama film based on the play Gestern und heute (Yesterday and Today) by Christa Winsloe and directed by Leontine Sagan with artistic direction from Carl Froelich, who also funded the film. Winsloe also wrote the screenplay and was on the set during filming. Due to the film's overt and openly lesbian themes, the film remains an international cult classic and enjoys widespread acclaim from critics.

== Plot ==
Manuela von Meinhardis, whose mother died when she was young and whose father serves in the military, is enrolled at an all-girls boarding school headed by the traditional and iron-fisted Fräulein von Nordeck zur Nidden. Manuela feels out of place in this strict environment. After witnessing Fräulein von Bernburg's compassion for the other girls, Manuela develops a passionate love for her teacher. The first spark of love begins with a goodnight kiss. Manuela receives this goodnight kiss on her first night at the school and, while the teacher normally gives all the girls a goodnight kiss on the forehead, Fräulein von Bernburg kisses her on the lips.

After not nervously forgetting her recitation for Fräulein von Bernburg's class, Manuela is asked to meet her in her room. Fräulein von Bernburg comments on the state of Manuela's clothes and gives Manuela one of her own petticoats. Manuela begins to weep and, after some time, confesses her love to Fräulein von Bernburg, who says that she cannot give Manuela special treatment. Shortly after, Ilsa von Westhagen, another student, writes a letter to her parents about the conditions of the school and has a worker smuggle it out.

When the girls prepare to put on the play Don Carlos by Friedrich Schiller for the headmistress's birthday, Manuela plays the lead male role, Don Carlos. Ilsa is also supposed to play a large role but is not allowed to perform after her letter is returned to the school. The play is a success, and Fräulein von Bernburg is moved. During the afterparty, the girls are served punch containing alcohol. Manuela drunkenly confesses her love for Fräulein von Bernburg and tells everyone about the petticoat. The headmistress overhears and Manuela passes out after her speech.

The headmistress puts her in solitary, but Manuela is moved out of solitary when the princess arrives at the school. After the duchess leaves, the headmistress scolds Fräulein von Bernburg's closeness with her students. Fräulein von Bernburg calls Manuela to her office and explains that Manuela is never to speak to her again.

Upon leaving Fräulein's von Bernburg's office, Manuela prepares to jump from several stories up in the main staircase. The girls save her, and both Fräulein von Bernburg and the headmistress are shaken. The movie ends with all the girls watching the headmistress as she slowly walks down the stairwell and down the hall in shaken silence.

== Cast ==
- Emilia Unda as Mother Fräulein von Nordeck zur Nidden, headmistress
- Dorothea Wieck as Governess Fräulein von Bernburg
- Hertha Thiele as Manuela von Meinhardis
- Hedwig Schlichter as Fräulein von Kesten
- Ellen Schwanneke as Ilse von Westhagen
- Erika Mann as Fräulein von Atems (or Attems)
- Gertrud de Lalsky as her Excellency von Ehrenhardt, Manuela's aunt
- Marte Hein as duchess, protector of the school
- Lene Berdolt as Fräulein von Garschner
- Lisi Scheerbach as Mademoiselle Oeuillet
- Margory Bodker as Miss Evans
- Else Ehser as Elise, wardrobe mistress
- Ilse Winter as Marga von Rasso
- Charlotte Witthauer as Ilse von Treischke
- Erika Biebrach as Lilli von Kattner
- Ethel Reschke as Oda von Oldersleben
- Annemarie von Rochhausen as Edelgard Komtesse von Mengsberg
- Ilse Vigdor as Anneliese von Beckendorf
- Barabara Pirk as Mia von Wollin
- Doris Thalmer as Mariechen von Ecke

== Production ==
Winsloe's stage play had previously appeared under the title Ritter Nérestan (Knight Nérestan) in Leipzig with Hertha Thiele and Claire Harden in the lead roles. After Leipzig the play was produced on the stage in Berlin as Gestern und Heute with a different cast and a more prominent lesbian theme, which was again toned down somewhat for the film.

Having mostly played the same roles on stage, the cast was able to produce the film at speed and on a low budget of 55,000 ℛ︁ℳ︁. It was largely shot at the Potsdam military orphanage, now a teacher training college for women. Carl Froelich's studio in Berlin-Tempelhof was also used. The film's original working title was Gestern und heute (Yesterday and Today) but this was thought too insipid and changed to increase the chances of box-office success. Although sound had only been used for two years in cinema, it was used artfully.

The film was groundbreaking in having an all-female cast; in its sympathetic portrayal of lesbian "pedagogical eros" (see Gustav Wyneken) and homoeroticism, revolving around the passionate love of a fourteen-year-old (Manuela) for her teacher (von Bernburg); and in its co-operative and profit-sharing financial arrangements (although these failed).

After many screen tests, Winsloe had insisted that her friend Thiele play the lead role. Director Sagan preferred Gina Falckenberg who had done the role on stage in Berlin, but along with having played Manuela in Leipzig, Thiele had played a young lesbian in Ferdinand Bruckner's stage play Die Kreatur (The Creature) and although 23 years old when filming began, she was considered to be more capable of portraying a 14-year-old girl.

== Reaction ==
The film had some impact in the Berlin lesbian clubs, but was largely eclipsed by the ongoing cult success of The Blue Angel (1930). The film did, however, generate large amounts of fan mail to the stars from all over Germany and was considered a success throughout much of Europe. The goodnight kiss Hertha Thiele (Manuela) received from Dorothea Wieck (Fräulein von Bernburg) was especially popular. One distributor even asked for more footage of other kisses like it to splice into prints of the film.

From its premiere at the Capitol cinema in Berlin until 1934, the film is said to have grossed some 6,000,000 ℛ︁ℳ︁. Despite the collective nature of the filming for which cast and crew received only a quarter of the normal wage, none saw a share of the six million Reichsmarks and Thiele later hinted that the profits had been mostly retained by the producers.

The film was distributed outside Germany and was a huge success in Romania. During a 1980 interview, Thiele said the school play scene caused a "longstockings and kissing" cult when the film was first shown there. It was also distributed in Japan, the United States, England and France.

Mädchen in Uniform won the audience referendum for Best Technical Perfection at the Venice Film Festival in 1932 and received the Japanese Kinema Junpo Award for Best Foreign Language Film (Tokyo, 1934).

Later, an alternative ending which subtly pandered to Nazi ideals enabled continued screening in German cinemas. Eventually even this version of the film was banned as "decadent" by the Nazi regime, which reportedly attempted to burn all of the existing prints. By then, though, several had been dispersed around the world. Leontine Sagan (director) and many others associated with the film fled Germany soon after the banning. Many of the cast and crew were Jewish, and those who could not escape from Germany died in the camps. Assistant director Walter Supper killed himself when it became clear his Jewish wife would be arrested.

Despite its later banning, Mädchen in Uniform was followed by several German films about intimate relationships among women, such as Acht Mädels im Boot (Eight Girls in a Boat, 1932) and Anna and Elizabeth (1933), which also starred Wieck and Thiele but was banned by the Nazis soon after its opening night along with the Nazi propaganda film I for You, You for Me (Me for You, You for Me, 1934).

The film is said to have inspired the 1949 novel Olivia by Dorothy Bussy, which treats very similar themes, and which was made into a French film Olivia (1951) directed by Jacqueline Audry.

There is a German remake of the film produced in 1958. Mädchen in Uniform (1958) was directed by Géza von Radványi and starred Lilli Palmer, Romy Schneider, and Therese Giehse. In this remake, the political criticism on the Prussian Center and the love story between the main characters was played down. Manuela comes to see Fräulein von Bernburg as a motherly figure rather than a romantic one.

There was another remake made in Mexico in 1950. The film is entitled Muchachas de uniforme and was directed by Alfredo B. Crevenna. Other films that were inspired by the themes in Mädchen in Uniform are Lost and Delirious (Lea Pool, Canada 2001) and Loving Annabella (Katherine Brooks, 2006). Mädchen in Uniform was also the inspiration for René Pollesch's play Mädchen in Uniform -- Wege aus der Selbstverwirklichung at the German Playhouse in Hamburg (2010).

Since the film's release, Mädchen in Uniform's message - and by extension what the movie symbolizes - has been widely debated by critics; with Christa Winsloe's and Leontine Sagan's intention to make the movie contested. B. Ruby Rich believes it to be, among other things, "a film about sexual repression in the name of social harmony, about the absent patriarchy and its forms of presence, about bonds between women which represent attraction instead of repulsion, and about the release of powers that can accompany the identification of a lesbian sexuality." While very few analyses question the film's queer messaging, there is a more contentious debate about whether the film is an effective allegory for the 1930s world and the rise of Hitler and the Nazi party.

In his 1947 book From Caligari to Hitler, German film critic Siegfried Kracauer argues that the film fails to fully break away from the authoritarian rule as "in the whole film, there is no hint of the possibility that authoritarian behavior might be superseded by democratic behavior." This, according to Kracauer, exists in several places from the character of Fräulein Von Bernberg, the treatment of Manuela and the ending of the film where the headmistress is forced out of the school after Manuela's attempted suicide. The bugles that conclude the film symbolise to Kraucer "that the principle of authority has not been shaken. The headmistress will continue to wield the scepter. And any possible softening of authoritarian discipline would only be in the interest of its preservation." Many people have refuted this argument however, including Nina Zimink who agrees that the bugle fair does symbolize that not everything is perfect after the departure of the headmistress, states that they signify "optimistic political development" in a world that is quite bleak. Whilst some critics, like Lisa Ohm and Lotte H. Eisner, agreed with Siegfried's argument in one regard or another, the primary perspective is to move away from this critical view. Rich, who championed the film as unabashedly queer, states that "intrusion to the film is an antidote to viewing this all-female space as a "free zone" within a patriarchal society, which can be seen to dominate not only in the concrete form of the staircase or Principal, but in the equally threatening form of external authority that waits just outside the school gates". There are also thinkers like Veronika Mayer who call the film "liberating" especially when placed in contrast to the 1958 film that is far more timid about the lesbian relationship between Manuela and Fräulein Von Bernburg, opting instead to present it as maternal connection.

== Censorship and surviving version ==
On October 1, 1931, a ban was placed on Mädchen in Uniform at the first inspection committee showing which forbad young people from viewing. On April 8, 1932, the decision for a 2480m shortened version was confirmed.

The film was released internationally and was very successful. The film had success particularly in Japan, the USA, France, Great Britain, and Mexico. In 1934 the film brought in 6 million Reichsmarks, while the production costs were only 55,000 Reichsmarks.

During the National Socialist rule in Germany, Mädchen in Uniform was banned by Joseph Goebbels, the Reich Minister of Propaganda. The film was only allowed to be shown abroad. This ban was not so much about the lesbian theme of the film, but rather the depictions of Prussian ruthlessness and the criticisms on authority and discipline.

At the FSK-Test on December 8, 1949, the film was approved again and the restrictions were lifted. The film was then unofficially distributed as a video shown in women's centers. After that, the first public reproduction was in 1977 when a West German broadcasting organization decided to broadcast the film.

The film was almost banned in the U.S., but Eleanor Roosevelt spoke highly of the film, resulting in the film getting a limited release in the US in 1932–33. Prints of the film survived the war, but it was censored heavily until the 1970s, and it was not shown again in Germany until 1977 when it was screened on television.

In 1978, Janus Films and Arthur Krim arranged for a limited re-release in the US in 35mm, including a screening at the Roxie Cinema in San Francisco. Also in 1978, the film was released in its surviving form by Janus Films on VHS with English subtitles.

Versions were released in the U.S. (1994) and the UK (2000) by the British Film Institute.

== Present day views ==
The film has had a lasting impact, both for its boldness in depicting lesbian desires and relationships free from censorship but also for its ability to depict the German political landscape of the 1930s despite being set in pre-World War One Prussia. Whilst critics like Siegfried Kracauer and Lisa Ohm were critical of the film for being too timid on fascism, many contemporary and present-day thinkers have commended the film for its commentary on such matters. Stephen Spender, an English poet and novelist who was a close friend of the writer Christopher Isherwood, was immensely critical of texts like the musical Cabaret, based on Isherwood's Goodbye to Berlin, stating that "there is not a single meal, or club, in the movie Cabaret, that Christopher and I could have afforded." and yet heralded Mädchen in Uniform a "masterpiece" for how it was able to present the contemporary environment.

In a list of the 100 most important German films, compiled in 1994 by the Association of German Cinémathèques, Mädchen in Uniform was placed at #44. On February 18, 2021, the British Film Institute featured the film in a Big Screen Classics season that primarily centered queer films like Maurice, Brokeback Mountain, and Desert Hearts, stating that "its call for revolutionary empathy is... timeless" a fact amplified by how the film was one of the oldest ones featured in the season. Amanda Lee Koe stated in an essay for the Criterion Collection that, "this film belongs to women who are trying to find themselves—and each other—in spite of repressive structures".

== Quotations from the film ==
- "Through discipline and hunger we will become great" (Spoken by the headmistress in reference to disciplining the students)
- "What you call sin, I call the great spirit of love, which takes a thousand forms." (Spoken by Fräulein Von Bernburg in reference to the boycott.)
- "I love you so, but you're always so distant. I can't ever go to your room, or talk to you" (Manuela discussing her feelings with Fräulein Von Bernburg)
- "Almost all the girls here have a crush on Miss von Bernburg. Oh, God! When I finally don't have to listen to that anymore. "Ilse! I envy you! You're in her dormitory! Oh, gosh, gosh, gosh! Tell me, is it true that she kisses you at night?" (Ilse von Westhagen introducing Fräulein von Bernburg to Manuela)
- "I fear nothing. Yes! Everybody should know! Long live our beloved Miss von Bernburg!" (Manuela)

== In popular culture ==
- In Anthony Powell's novel The Acceptance World (1955), the narrator, Nick Jenkins, is re-united with his first major love, Jean Templer, after Jean and her sister-in-law, Mona, have returned to the Ritz (London) on New Year's Eve 1931, following a screening of the film. Jean is accompanied by her brother Peter. Nick (who has seen the film) is mildly mocked by his old schoolfriend Peter (who has not), for saying that the film is not primarily about lesbians.
- In the film Henry & June (1990), this is one of the films shown in the small art-house theater frequented by the main characters.
- The film Loving Annabelle (2006) was reportedly inspired by Mädchen in Uniform.
- The album Mädchen in Uniform (2009) by the Austrian band Nachtmahr.

== See also ==
- List of German films of 1919–1932
- German expressionist cinema
- List of LGBT-related films
- List of LGBT-related films directed by women
