= Karl Dannemann =

German actor (1896-1945)

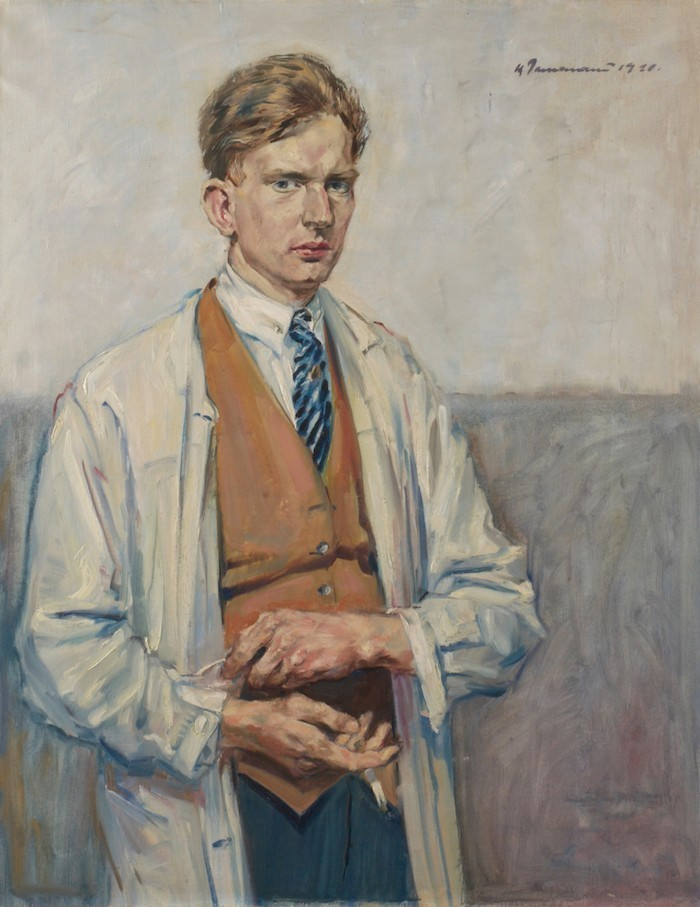
- Born: 22 March 1896; Bremen, German Empire
- Died: 4 May 1945 (aged 49); Berlin, Germany
- Occupation: Actor
- Years active: 1934-1945

Karl Dannemann (22 March 1896 – 4 May 1945) was a German actor. He appeared in more than 50 films between 1934 and 1945.

He was born in Bremen on March 22, 1896. Before his acting career, he trained and worked as an artist and served in the Imperial German Army during World War I on the Eastern Front from 1916 to 1918.

He began his acting career in 1934 after the Nazi Party came to power in Germany and continued to act into World War II.

On May 4, 1945 following the Battle of Berlin, he committed suicide to avoid being captured by Soviet forces.

== Partial filmography ==
- Volldampf voraus! (1934) - Kramer, Obermaat
- Trouble with Jolanthe (1934) - Rupf, der neue Gendarm
- Schwarzer Jäger Johanna (1934) - Volkert Ummen
- Eine Siebzehnjährige (1934) - Christoph, Knecht auf dem Gut
- I for You, You for Me (1934) - Christian Busch
- Sergeant Schwenke (1935) - Oberwachtmeister Wölfert
- Ein Mädel aus guter Familie (1935) - Ein Gendarm
- Joan of Arc (1935) - Englischer Soldat
- An Ideal Husband (1935) - Parker, Oberingenieur
- One Too Many on Board (1935) - III. Offizier Ackermann
- Pillars of Society (1935) - Aune
- The Higher Command (1935) - Wenzel Lukas, Bursche
- A Doctor of Conviction (1936) - Felgentreus Vetter
- Moscow-Shanghai (1936) - Grischa
- Es geht um mein Leben (1936) - Kriminalrat Jastrow
- Der Katzensteg (1937) - Sohn Fritz Merckel
- Tango Notturno (1937) - Smith
- Mit versiegelter Order (1938) - Thomsen
- Abenteuer in Marokko (1938) - Pierre Prévost / Hauptmann Treiber
- Der Spieler (1938)
- Die Pfingstorgel (1938) - Gustav Toelle
- Dreizehn Mann und eine Kanone (1938)
- Water for Canitoga (1939) - Dyke
- The Strange Woman (1939) - Kapitän Vaisänen
- Alarm at Station III (1939) - Thomas Kolk
- The Desert Song (1939) - Tom
- The Star of Rio (1940) - Holländischer Beamter der Hafenpolizei
- The Fox of Glenarvon (1940) - Pat Moore
- Achtung! Feind hört mit! (1940) - Portloff
- Für die Katz (1940) - Hinrich Tapken
- Herz geht vor Anker (1940) - Steuermann
- Bismarck (1940) - Adjudant des Prinzen Friedrich Karl (uncredited)
- Blutsbrüderschaft (1941) - Berger
- The Girl from Fano (1941) - Bootsmann
- My Life for Ireland (1941) - Richard Sullivan
- Kopf hoch, Johannes! (1941) - Vater Panse
- Carl Peters (1941) - Dr. Karl Jühlke
- Ich klage an (1941)
- Wedding in Barenhof (1942) - Karl Zitzow, Kutscher und Kammerdiener
- Rembrandt (1942) - Banning Cocq
- Der große Schatten (1942) - Schauspieler
- Die Entlassung (1942)
- My Summer Companion (1943) - Förster Heiner Barteck
- Die unheimliche Wandlung des Alex Roscher (1943) - Thomas
- Titanic (1943) - 1. Funker Philipps (uncredited)
- The Golden Spider (1943) - Bumm, Werkmeister
- A Beautiful Day (1944) - Braschke
- Junge Adler (1944) - Herr Bachus
- The Roedern Affair (1944) - Soldat Knuse
- That Was My Life (1944) - Meusers / Bauer
- Eines Tages (1945) - Herr Brösicke
- Die Schenke zur ewigen Liebe (1945) - Pötter
- Der Scheiterhaufen (1945)
- The Court Concert (1948)
- Das fremde Leben (1951) - Herr Kliem
