= Brigitte Grothum =

German actress

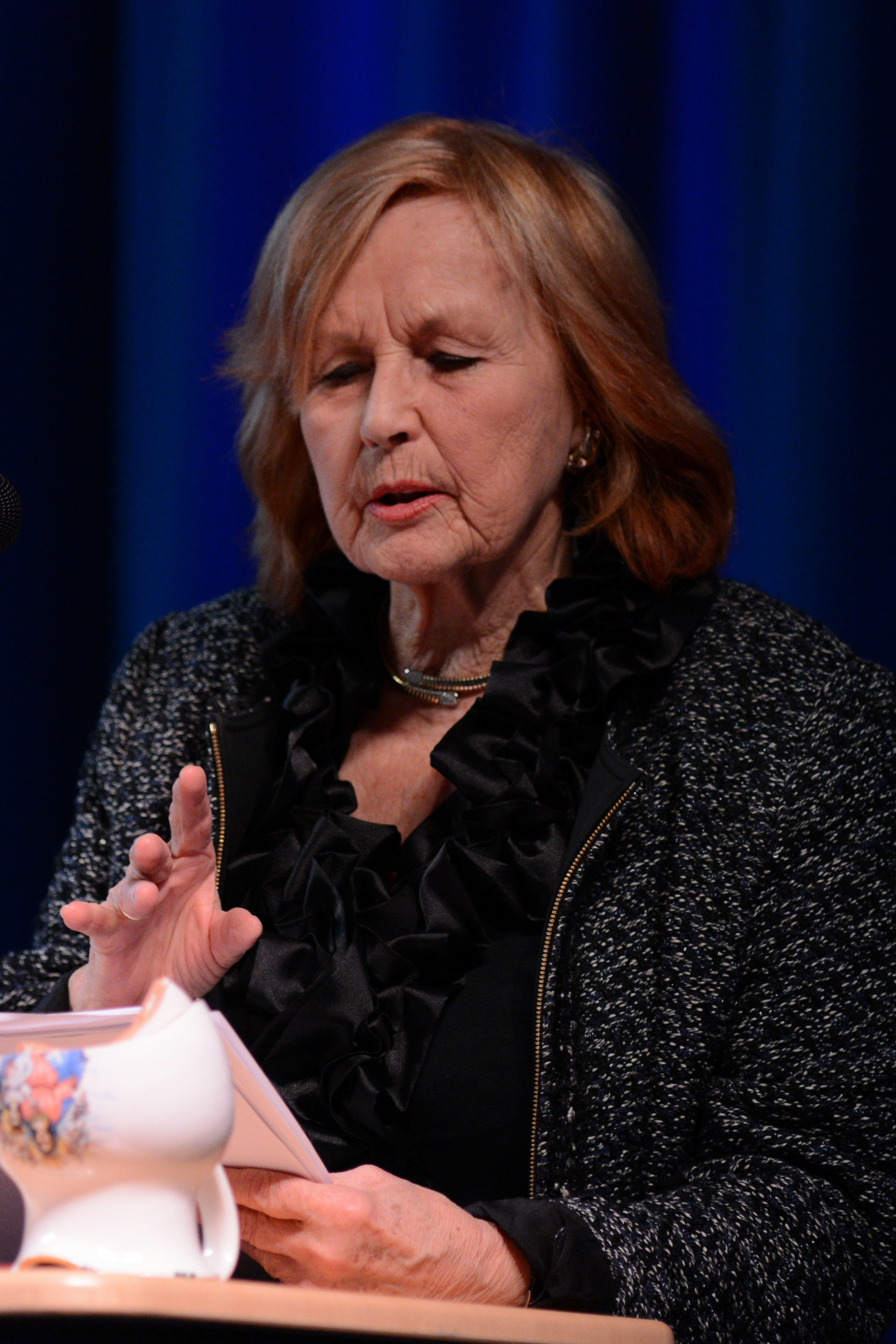
- Brigitte Grothum 2013 at a performance in Duisburg
- Born: 26 February 1935 (age 91); Dessau, Germany
- Occupation: Actress
- Years active: 1955-present

Brigitte Grothum (born 26 February 1935) is a German film actress. She has appeared in 50 films since 1955. She was born in Dessau, Germany.

== Selected filmography ==
- Ripening Youth (1955), as Dora
- The First Day of Spring (1956), as Trixi
- Das Mädchen Marion (1956), as Marion von Hoff
- The Last Ones Shall Be First (1957), as Irene Darrandt
- Lemke's Widow (1957), as Lore
- Two Times Adam, One Time Eve (1959), as Silja
- The Miracle of Father Malachia (1961), as Gussy
- The Strange Countess (1961), as Margaret Reedle
- Her Most Beautiful Day (1962), as Inge
- The Red Frenzy (1962), as Katrin
- The Happy Years of the Thorwalds (1962) as Helga Thorwald
- The Inn on the River (1962), as Leila Smith
- The Curse of the Yellow Snake (1963), as Joan Bray
- Ein Mann namens Harry Brent (1968, TV miniseries), as Jane Conway
- L'Astragale (1968), as Ginette
- Einer spinnt immer (1971), as Liane
- Grete Minde (1977), as Emerentz Zernitz
- Drei Damen vom Grill (1977–1992, TV series, 140 episodes), as Magda Färber
- Liebling Kreuzberg (1986, TV series), as Erika, Robert Liebling's ex-wife
- The Dancing Girl (舞姫) (1989), as Anna Weigelt
- The Last Train (2006), as Gabrielle Hellman
- Wunderkinder (2011), as Hanna Reich
- Mein Lover, sein Vater und ich! (2014, TV film), as Nicky's Mother
