= Wedding in Barenhof =

1942 film directed by Carl Froelich

- German DVD cover
- German: Hochzeit auf Bärenhof
- Directed by: Carl Froelich
- Written by: Jochen Kuhlmey; Gustav Lohse; Hermann Sudermann (novel)
- Produced by: Carl Froelich; Friedrich Pflughaupt
- Starring: Heinrich George; Paul Wegener; Ilse Werner
- Cinematography: Günther Anders
- Edited by: Johanna Schmidt
- Music by: Theo Mackeben
- Production company: UFA
- Distributed by: UFA
- Release date: 8 June 1942
- Running time: 98 minutes
- Country: Germany
- Language: German

Wedding in Barenhof (German: Hochzeit auf Bärenhof) is a 1942 German historical comedy film directed by Carl Froelich and starring Heinrich George, Paul Wegener and Ilse Werner.

The film's art direction was by Walter Haag. It was shot at the Babelsberg Studios in Berlin.

== Cast ==
- Heinrich George as Baron von Hanke, Lord of Bärenhof
- Paul Wegener as Leonhard von Kraków
- Ilse Werner as Roswitha von Kraków
- Ernst von Klipstein as Ulanenoffizier Lothar von Pütz
- Carola Toelle as Frau von Kraków
- Alice Treff as Lothar's admirer
- Charlotte Schultz as aunt Elfriede
- Ernst Dernburg as Kommandeur
- Eduard Wesener as adjutant von Klewitz
- Walter Steinbeck as Landrat
- Hildegard Grethe as Frau des Landrates
- Rudolf Klein-Rogge as Medical Council
- Ernst Waldow as Regierungsrat
- Emil Heß as Königliche Hoheit
- Sigrid Becker as Lisbeth, Roswitha's chambermaid
- Antonie Jaeckel as Frau von Schwerdtfeger
- Karl Dannemann as Karl Zitzow, coachman and valet
- Else Reval as housekeeper
- Gerhard Dammann as auctioneer
- Ernst Rotmund as bookmaker
- Lina Carstens as Fränze von Hanckel
- Erik Radolf as adjutant
- Hanne Frey as Lothar's table lady
- Paul Mederow as lawyer
