= Carl Froelich =

German film director

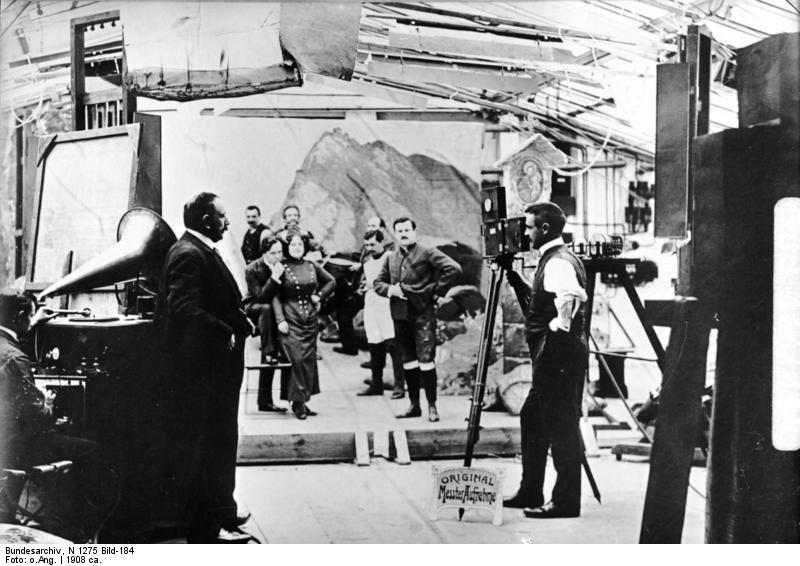
Carl Froelich directing Die Regimentstochter (1908)

Carl August Hugo Froelich (5 September 1875 – 12 February 1953) was a German film pioneer and film director. He was born in Berlin and died in West Berlin.

== Biography ==
=== Apparatus builder and cameraman ===
From 1903 Froelich was a colleague of Oskar Messter, one of the advance guard of German cinema, for whom initially he worked on the construction of cinematographic equipment. As cameraman for Messter's weekly newsreels he filmed among many other things the aftermath of a train accident on the Berlin elevated railway on 28 September 1908, one of the worst transport disasters of the time.

=== Film director and producer ===
Between 1912 and 1951 he made 77 films.

In 1913 Froelich made his directorial debut with a film titled Richard Wagner. In 1920 he founded his own production company, Froelich-Film GmbH, among the productions of which were Kabale und Liebe (1921), Die Brüder Karamasoff (1922), and Mutter und Kind (1924). During these years he often filmed with the actress Henny Porten, who made her screen debut in one of his earliest films, and with whom between 1926 and 1929 he shared ownership of a production company.

In 1929 Froelich made one of the first German sound films, Die Nacht gehört uns ("The Night Belongs To Us"), using the Tri-Ergon sound system. In 1930 he took over two glasshouses in Berlin-Tempelhof, which had been used as studios in the days of silent film, and had them converted to sound film studios. Here he produced many films, including Rolf Hansen's short film Das Schönheitsfleckchen (1936) ("The Beauty Spot"), the first German drama film in colour. In 1931 he was advisor, as "senior artistic director", to Leontine Sagan's famous boarding-school film and later lesbian classic, Mädchen in Uniform ("Girls in Uniform") (1931).

By 1933 Froelich was one of Germany's most noted film artists, producing successful films with the stars of the period, among others Hans Albers, Heinz Rühmann, Ingrid Bergman and Zarah Leander.

Some of the best-known of the films he made during this period were:

- 1934: Ich für dich, du für mich for the Reich Propaganda Directorate of the NSDAP
- 1938: Heimat
- 1940: Das Herz der Königin ("The Queen's Heart"), an anti-British historical film about Mary, Queen of Scots
- 1941: Der Gasmann, a propaganda film, in which Heinz Rühmann plays a gas-meter reader suspected of being a foreign spy

=== Culture politics ===
Froelich became a member of the National Socialist Party in 1933 and took over the direction of the Gesamtverbandes der Filmherstellung und Filmverwertung ("Union of Film Manufacture and Film Evaluation"). In 1937 he was awarded a professorship and in 1939 was appointed president of the Reichsfilmkammer, an office which he retained until the end of the war in 1945. The Reichsfilmkammer was subordinate to the Reichskulturkammer, which as a National Socialist trade organisation regulated and controlled access to all artistic professions. He was one of the few filmmakers that received the title "Filmprofessor" from Goebbels.

=== After the end of the war ===
After the end of the war Froelich was arrested and in 1948 de-Nazified. His studio had been badly damaged during the war and did not resume production. Only two more films were made under his direction before his death: Three Girls Spinning and Stips.

== Selected filmography ==
=== Director ===
- Werner Krafft (1916)
- Ikarus, the Flying Man (1918)
- The Loves of Käthe Keller (1919)
- Wandering Souls (1921)
- The Brothers Karamazov (1921)
- Island of the Dead (1921)
- In Thrall to the Claw (1921)
- The Weather Station (1923)
- Mother and Child (1924)
- Chamber Music (1925)
- The Adventures of Sybil Brent (1925)
- Tragedy (1925)
- The Flames Lie (1926)
- Roses from the South (1926)
- The Long Intermission (1927)
- My Aunt, Your Aunt (1927)
- Lotte (1928)
- Escape (1928)
- Love in the Cowshed (1928)
- Violantha (1928)
- The Night Belongs to Us (1929)
- German Wine (1929)
- The Woman Everyone Loves Is You (1929)
- Hans in Every Street (1930)
- Fire in the Opera House (1930)
- Louise, Queen of Prussia (1931)
- Mädchen in Uniform (1931)
- This One or None (1932)
- Gitta Discovers Her Heart (1932)
- Love at First Sight (1932)
- Ripening Youth (1933)
- The Hymn of Leuthen (1933)
- Trouble with Jolanthe (1934)
- I for You, You for Me (1934)
- Sergeant Schwenke (1935)
- The Private Life of Louis XIV (1935)
- I Was Jack Mortimer (1935)
- The Dreamer (1936)
- When the Cock Crows (1936)
- If We All Were Angels (1936)
- Such Great Foolishness (1937)
- Heimat (1938)
- The Four Companions (1938)
- The Roundabouts of Handsome Karl (1938)
- The Life and Loves of Tschaikovsky (1939)
- The Gasman (1941)
- Wedding in Barenhof (1942)
- The Buchholz Family (1944)
- Marriage of Affection (1944)
- Three Girls Spinning (1950)
- Stips (1951)

=== Writer ===
- The Marriage of Luise Rohrbach (1917)
- The Salamander Ruby (1918)

=== Producer ===
- The Lovers of Midnight (1931)
- The Hunter from Kurpfalz (1933)
- The Abduction of the Sabine Women (1936)
- Carmen, la de Triana (1938)
- The Way to Freedom (1941)
- Torreani (1951)
