= Carl Peters (film) =

1941 film

- Directed by: Herbert Selpin
- Written by: Erich zu Klampen; Herbert Selpin; Walter Zerlett-Olfenius; Ernst von Salomon
- Produced by: Carl Wilhelm Tetting
- Starring: Hans Albers; Karl Dannemann; Fritz Odemar
- Cinematography: Franz Koch
- Edited by: Friedel Buckow
- Music by: Franz Doelle
- Production company: Bavaria Film
- Distributed by: Bavaria Film
- Release date: 21 March 1941
- Running time: 110 minutes
- Country: Nazi Germany
- Language: German

Carl Peters is a 1941 German historical drama film directed by Herbert Selpin and starring Hans Albers, Karl Dannemann, and Fritz Odemar. It was produced as an anti-British propaganda film during the Second World War.

Albers portrays the titular German colonial leader. Bayume Mohamed Husen plays his native guide.

The art director Fritz Maurischat worked on the film's sets. It was shot at the Bavaria Studios in Munich and the Barrandov Studios in Prague.

== Synopsis ==
The film is a biopic of Carl Peters, one of the founders of German East Africa, and takes place while he is under investigation by the Reichstag for unnecessary brutality. Instead, Peters openly calls for a global policy of colonialism and conquest, which he says will require issuing carte blanche to hard-hearted men like himself. He defends his policy of using execution without trial to prevent a native uprising, which, he insists, the parliamentarians could not have prevented. The parliamentarians, who are all depicted as Jews, refuse to accept this explanation, demonstrating the alleged dangers of democracy, constitutional monarchy, and all other political systems in which the Führer principle is ignored.

== Context in Nazi propaganda ==
This film is intended to provoke renewed anger over the Versailles Treaty: as the Kaiser's German colonial empire, the third largest in existence at the time, had been divided up between the victorious Allies after World War I. The film's somewhat crude attack on the British Empire is typical of later films, such as Ohm Krüger, which were made after Hitler came to the conclusion that no separate peace with Britain was possible. Ironically, though, the British colonial officials are depicted far more sympathetically than the civil service and elected politicians of the German Empire, who fired Carl Peters.

== Plot ==
The story begins in London in 1892. Members of the British civil service in a club discuss Carl Peters, who has just crossed the English Channel with intelligence officers, wondering whether to stop Peters before he tries to achieve his objective and consolidate the position of the German Empire in East Africa.

Carl Peters returns to Germany to garner support, but his exploration projects are met with little response. He left on his own for Africa; arrived in Zanzibar, where he tries to convince the German consulate to support his effort. He intends to establish a colony and make it a protectorate of the imperial government. Peters concludes commercial treaties with local tribal leaders, before the British or the Belgians manage to do so.

Carl Peters then survives a tropical disease and an attempted poisoning from the Intelligence Service. He finally receives a letter from Kaiser Wilhelm I assuring protection for his colony.

Carl Peters returns to Africa and suffers through various trials, not only from the British, but also from the director of the Colonial Department of the German Foreign Office, who happens to be Jewish. Carl Peters escapes danger, but his friend Karl Ludwig Jühlke is a victim. While Peters leads his expedition to an end, bad news reaches Berlin. Chancellor Bismarck must resign, but Peters is appointed Reichskommissar (Commissioner of Colonies). Back in Berlin, however, Peters must answer to the German people's elected representatives in the Reichstag and to respond to accusations of brutality by the Social Democratic Party of Germany (SPD). Despite the support of a witness in his favour, who is none other than a black Anglican Bishop, and despite the heated rhetoric that Peters uses, he is forced to resign.

== Cast ==
- Hans Albers as Dr. Carl Peters
- Karl Dannemann as Dr. Karl Jühlke
- Fritz Odemar as Count Pfeil
- Herbert Hübner as Councillor Leo Kayser
- Mohamed Husen as Ramasan
- Toni von Bukovics as Frau Peters, mother
- Wilhelm P. Krüger as Old Wilhelm
- Jack Trevor as British Consul at Zanzibar
- Theodor Thony as Dr. Nicolo
- Andrews Engelmann as Capt. Mathew
- Ernst Fritz Fürbringer as Count Wehr-Bandelin
- Erika von Thellmann as Frau Kayser
- Friedrich Ulmer as Prince Hohenlohe-Langenberg
- Hans Leibelt as Prof. Karl Engel
- Reinhold Pasch as Capt. Greenwood, alias Behrens
- Theo Shall as Robert Mitchell
- Philipp Manning as Sir Anthony Cerry
- Hans Mierendorff as Consul Oswald, in Zanzibar
- Rolf Prasch as Kaiser Wilhelm I
- Friedrich Otto Fischer as Otto von Bismarck
- Reinhold Bernt as Jungle Patrolman Hansen
- Richard Ludwig as British Ambassador to Germany
- Aruth Wartan as Arab Slaver
- Justus Paris as Julius Kayser
- Lea Niako as Club Dancer
- Michael Symo as Club Dancer
- Ali Ghito as Mrs. Wilson
- Fred Goebel as Mr. Kendall
- Karl Jüstel as Club Patron
- Walter Neusel as Johnny
- André Saint-Germain as Capt. Bekker
- Georg H. Schnell as Stacy
- Lewis Brody as Tribal Chief

== Bibliography ==
- Koonz, Claudia (2003). The Nazi Conscience. Cambridge, MA: Harvard University Press. ISBN 978-0-674-01172-4.
- Leiser, Erwin (1975). Nazi Cinema. New York: Macmillan. ISBN 978-0-02-570230-1.
