= Walter Supper =

German actor and screenwriter

- Born: 8 April 1887; Hamm, German Empire
- Died: 3 March 1943 (aged 55); Berlin, Nazi Germany
- Occupation: Screenwriter
- Years active: 1920–1937 (film)

Walter Supper (8 April 1887 – 3 March 1943) was a German screenwriter. Supper worked on more than thirty screenplays during his career, and also worked occasionally as an actor and director.

Supper refused to divorce his Jewish wife under Nazi pressure, which effectively ended his career. He eventually committed suicide with his wife when it became clear she was about to be arrested.

== Selected filmography ==
- Wandering Souls (1921)
- Island of the Dead (1921)
- Mother and Child (1924)
- Chamber Music (1925)
- The Adventures of Sybil Brent (1925)
- The Flames Lie (1926)
- Roses from the South (1926)
- The Long Intermission (1927)
- My Aunt, Your Aunt (1927)
- Lotte (1928)
- Love in the Cowshed (1928)
- Violantha (1928)
- The Fourth from the Right (1929)
- The Night Belongs to Us (1929)
- Hans in Every Street (1930)
- Fire in the Opera House (1930)
- This One or None (1932)
- Love at First Sight (1932)
- Ripening Youth (1933)
- Count Woronzeff (1934)
- Trouble with Jolanthe (1934)
- Make Me Happy (1935)
- The Foolish Virgin (1935)
- The Gypsy Baron (1935)
- Black Roses (1935)
- City of Anatol (1936)
- Ride to Freedom (1937)
- Wells in Flames (1937)

== Bibliography ==
- Hardt, Urusula. From Caligari to California: Erich Pommer's Life in the International Film Wars. Berghahn Books, 1996.
