= Ripening Youth (1955 film) =

1955 film

- Directed by: Ulrich Erfurth
- Written by: Fritz Aeckerle; Gerhard Biller; Max Dreyer (play)
- Starring: Adelheid Seeck; Maximilian Schell; Albert Lieven
- Cinematography: Ekkehard Kyrath
- Edited by: Liselotte Cochius
- Music by: Hanson Milde-Meissner
- Production company: Concordia Film
- Distributed by: Argus-Film
- Release date: 15 September 1955
- Running time: 97 minutes
- Country: West Germany
- Language: German

Ripening Youth (German: Reifende Jugend) is a 1955 West German drama film directed by Ulrich Erfurth and starring Adelheid Seeck, Maximilian Schell, and Albert Lieven. It was shot at the Göttingen Studios in Göttingen. The film's sets were designed by the art director Alfred Bütow.

== Cast ==
- Adelheid Seeck as Charlotte Holsten
- Christine Keller as Regine Albing
- Maximilian Schell as Jürgen Sengebusch
- Mathias Wieman as Obersdtudiendirektor Dr. Berger
- Albert Lieven as Studienrat Dr. Crusius
- Klaus Barner as Erich Mettke, Oberprimaner
- Charles Brauer as Bert Ilgen, Oberprimaner
- Harald Giese as Andreas Bolz, Oberprimaner
- Brigitte Grothum as Dora
- Wolfgang Höper as Klaus Helmer, Oberprimaner
- Ilse Künkele as Sekretärin des Direktors
- Phoebe Monnard as Frau Scholz, Dr. Crusius' Wirtin
- Eberhard Müller-Elmau as Neckermann, Hausmeister
- Kurt Vespermann as Oberstudienrat Dr. Türck
- Ernst von Klipstein as Studienrat Baumbauer

== Bibliography ==
- Bock, Hans-Michael & Bergfelder, Tim. The Concise CineGraph. Encyclopedia of German Cinema. Berghahn Books, 2009.
