= Gustav Lohse =

German film editor

- Born: 22 May 1911; Berlin, German Empire
- Died: 16 March 1999 (aged 87); Appen
- Occupation: Editor
- Years active: 1932–1951 (film)

Gustav Lohse (22 May 1911 – 16 March 1999) was a German film editor.

== Selected filmography ==
- Love at First Sight (1932)
- Viennese Waltz (1932)
- The Hymn of Leuthen (1933)
- Ripening Youth (1933)
- Trouble with Jolanthe (1934)
- Sergeant Schwenke (1935)
- I Was Jack Mortimer (1935)
- The Private Life of Louis XIV (1935)
- When the Cock Crows (1936)
- The Dreamer (1936)
- If We All Were Angels (1936)
- Such Great Foolishness (1937)
- The Model Husband (1937)
- The Four Companions (1938)
- The Roundabouts of Handsome Karl (1938)
- The Life and Loves of Tschaikovsky (1939)
- The Gasman (1941)
- Wedding in Barenhof (1942)
- Three Girls Spinning (1950)

== Bibliography ==
- Michelle Langford. Directory of World Cinema: Germany. Intellect Books, 2012.
