= Reimar Kuntze =

German cinematographer

- Born: 27 January 1900; Berlin, German Empire
- Died: 18 August 1949 (aged 49); Munich, Bavaria, West Germany
- Occupation: Cinematographer
- Years active: 1923–1949 (film)

Reimar Kuntze (27 January 1900 – 18 August 1949) was a German cinematographer. He worked on more than 100 film productions during his career.

== Selected filmography ==
- I.N.R.I. (1923)
- Adam and Eve (1923)
- The Hobgoblin (1924)
- Garragan (1924)
- Husbands or Lovers (1924)
- Living Buddhas (1925)
- Wood Love (1925)
- The Woman without Money (1925)
- The Captain from Koepenick (1926)
- Women and Banknotes (1926)
- Marriage Announcement (1926)
- Berlin: Symphony of a Metropolis (1927)
- One Against All (1927)
- The Ways of Love Are Strange (1927)
- Master and Mistress (1928)
- Dawn (1929)
- The Night Belongs to Us (1929)
- The White Devil (1930)
- Never Trust a Woman (1930)
- Fire in the Opera House (1930)
- How Do I Become Rich and Happy? (1930)
- End of the Rainbow (1930)
- The Land of Smiles (1930)
- Mädchen in Uniform (1931)
- The Typist (1931)
- The Soaring Maiden (1931)
- The Private Secretary (1931)
- The Trunks of Mr. O.F. (1931)
- Victoria and Her Hussar (1931)
- The Bartered Bride (1932)
- A Tremendously Rich Man (1932)
- Five from the Jazz Band (1932)
- Spies at the Savoy Hotel (1932)
- Here's Berlin (1932)
- Tell Me Who You Are (1933)
- A Song Goes Round the World (1933)
- A Woman Like You (1933)
- The Emperor's Waltz (1933)
- Ripening Youth (1933)
- The Prodigal Son (1934)
- Trouble with Jolanthe (1934)
- The Private Life of Louis XIV (1935)
- If It Were Not for Music (1935)
- The Blonde Carmen (1935)
- I Was Jack Mortimer (1935)
- If We All Were Angels (1936)
- The Abduction of the Sabine Women (1936)
- The Dreamer (1936)
- When the Cock Crows (1936)
- Togger (1937)
- The Muzzle (1938)
- The Roundabouts of Handsome Karl (1938)
- The Four Companions (1938)
- Beloved Augustin (1940)
- Nanette (1940)
- The Gasman (1941)
- Much Ado About Nixi (1942)
- Love Me (1942)
- A Man with Principles? (1943)
- The Master of the Estate (1943)
- The Noltenius Brothers (1945)
- Artists' Blood (1949)
- Don't Dream, Annette (1949)
- Royal Children (1950)
- Eyes of Love (1951)

== Bibliography ==
- Noack, Frank. Veit Harlan: The Life and Work of a Nazi Filmmaker. University Press of Kentucky, 2016.
