= Trouble with Jolanthe =

- German film poster
- German: Der Wetterwart
- Directed by: Carl Froelich
- Written by: August Hinrichs (play); Robert A. Stemmle; Walter Supper
- Produced by: Carl Froelich
- Starring: Wilhelm P. Krüger; Marianne Hoppe; Olaf Bach
- Cinematography: Reimar Kuntze
- Edited by: Gustav Lohse
- Music by: Hanson Milde-Meissner
- Production company: Carl Froelich-Film
- Distributed by: Europa-Filmverleih
- Release date: 18 August 1934
- Running time: 99 minutes
- Country: Germany
- Language: German

Trouble with Jolanthe (German: Krach um Jolanthe) is a 1934 German romantic comedy film directed by Carl Froelich and starring Wilhelm P. Krüger, Marianne Hoppe and Olaf Bach. It was remade in 1955 as The Happy Village. A separate Swedish adaptation, Jolanta the Elusive Pig, had been released in 1945.

== Cast ==
- Wilhelm P. Krüger as Krischan Lampken, farmer
- Marianne Hoppe as Anna, daughter
- Olaf Bach as Müller Bunjes
- Marieluise Claudius as Sophie, sister
- Fritz Hoopts as Hinnerk, servant
- Carsta Löck as Stine, maid
- Albert Lieven as Wesemeier, the new teacher
- Karl Dannemann as Rupf, the new gendarme
- Willi Schur as Egon Mahnke, bailiff
- Fita Benkhoff as Erna Klüfkorn, bride
- Max Eckard as farmer's friend #1
- Hugo Froelich as Oncken, farmer
- Richard Handwerk as Borchers, farmer
- Willi Parshen as farmer's friend #3
- Jaspar von Oertzen as farmer's friend #2

== Production ==
Trouble with Jolanthe is based on a play by August Hinrichs, which was Adolf Hitler's favorite.

== See also ==
- Jolanta the Elusive Pig (1945)

== Works cited ==
- Hull, David (1969). Film in the Third Reich: Art and Propaganda in Nazi Germany. Simon & Schuster. SBN 671214861.
