= Franz Weihmayr =

German cinematographer (1903–1969)

- Born: 30 December 1903; Munich, Germany
- Died: 26 May 1969 (aged 65); Munich, West Germany
- Occupation: Cinematographer
- Years active: 1924–1964 (film)

Franz Weihmayr (30 December 1903 – 26 May 1969) was a German cinematographer who worked on over 80 films between 1924 and 1964. He was one of the leading German cinematographers of the Nazi era, working on a number of Zarah Leander films and the 1935 propaganda documentary Triumph of the Will. His marriage to Ada Tschechowa ended in divorce. After the Second World War, Weihmayr worked in West German cinema, including rubble films such as Love '47.

== Selected filmography ==
- They May Not Marry (1929)
- Do You Know That Little House on Lake Michigan? (1929)
- On the Reeperbahn at Half Past Midnight (1929)
- Mädchen in Uniform (1931)
- Anna and Elizabeth (1933)
- Hans Westmar (1933)
- The Lost Valley (1934)
- William Tell (1934)
- Elisabeth and the Fool (1934)
- Miracle of Flight (1935)
- Stjenka Rasin (1936)
- Calling the Tune (1936)
- The House of the Spaniard (1936)
- The Court Concert (1936)
- Moscow-Shanghai (1936)
- To New Shores (1937)
- Daphne and the Diplomat (1937)
- La Habanera (1937)
- The Blue Fox (1938)
- By a Silken Thread (1938)
- Heimat (1938)
- My Aunt, Your Aunt (1939)
- The Life and Loves of Tschaikovsky (1939)
- The Desert Song (1939)
- Das Herz der Königin (1940)
- Small Town Poet (1940)
- Wunschkonzert (1940)
- The Way to Freedom (1941)
- Beloved World (1942)
- The Great Love (1942)
- Back Then (1943)
- Nora (1944)
- Paths in Twilight (1948)
- Journey to Happiness (1948)
- Love '47 (1949)
- Amico (1949)
- Two Times Lotte (1950)
- Who Is This That I Love? (1950)
- My Niece Susanne (1950)
- Melody of Fate (1950)
- Dr. Holl (1951)
- The Great Temptation (1952)
- Two People (1952)
- I and You (1953)
- Anna Louise and Anton (1953)
- Don't Forget Love (1953)
- Conchita and the Engineer (1954)
- Canaris Master Spy (1954)
- Men at a Dangerous Age (1954)
- Devil in Silk (1956)
- Marriages Forbidden (1957)
- And Lead Us Not Into Temptation (1957)
- A Summer You Will Never Forget (1959)

== Bibliography ==
- Knopp, Guido. Hitler's Women. Routledge, 2003.
- Rother, Rainer. Leni Riefenstahl: The Seduction of Genius. Continuum International Publishing Group, 2003.
