= I for You, You for Me =

1934 film directed by Carl Froelich

- Directed by: Carl Froelich
- Written by: Hans Gustl Kernmayr
- Starring: Ruth Eweler; Karl Dannemann; Carl de Vogt
- Music by: Hanson Milde-Meissner
- Production company: Carl Froelich Filmproduktion
- Release date: 30 November 1934
- Running time: 89 minutes
- Country: Germany
- Language: German

I for You, You for Me (German: Ich für dich, du für mich) is a 1934 German drama film directed by Carl Froelich and starring Ruth Eweler, Karl Dannemann and Carl de Vogt. It was made as a propaganda film in support of the Nazi regime's Reich Labour Service and the League of German Girls. It promoted the concepts of blood and soil.

== Cast ==
- Maria Wancka as Lagerführerin
- Inge Kick as Hanne
- Ruth Eweler as Inge
- Ruth Claus as Maria
- Karl Dannemann as Christian Busch
- Carl de Vogt as Siedler Kollerbuch
- Knut Hartwig as Siedler Schmidelka
- Eleonore Stadie as Berta
- Liselotte Wahl as Lotte
- Heinz Rippert as Werner Kramer
- Paul W. Krüger as Siedler Mahlow
- Katja Bennefeld as Frau Kollerbuch
- Hugo Froelich as Gendarm Kisecke
- Ernst Gronau as Herr Häberlein
- Emilia Unda as Frau Häberlein
- Toni Tetzlaff as Frau Höpfner

== Bibliography ==
- Hales, Barbara, Petrescu, Mihaela and Weinstein, Valerie. Continuity and Crisis in German Cinema, 1928-1936. Boydell & Brewer, 2016
- Klaus, Ulrich J. Deutsche Tonfilme: Jahrgang 1934. Klaus-Archiv, 1988.
- Waldman, Harry. Nazi Films in America, 1933-1942. McFarland, 2008.
- Welch, David. The Third Reich: Politics and Propaganda. Psychology Press, 2002.
