= Franz Schroedter =

German art director (1897-1968)

- Born: 9 May 1897; Berlin, German Empire
- Died: 14 November 1968 (aged 71); Hamburg, West Germany
- Occupation: Art director
- Years active: 1920–1966 (film)

Franz Schroedter (9 May 1897 – 14 November 1968) was a German art director.

== Selected filmography ==
- The Black Count (1920)
- The Dance of Love and Happiness (1921)
- The New Paradise (1921)
- The Queen of Whitechapel (1922)
- The Men of Frau Clarissa (1922)
- The Cigarette Countess (1922)
- The Shadows of That Night (1922)
- The Marriage Swindler (1922)
- The Shadow of the Mosque (1923)
- The Woman from the Orient (1923)
- The Voice of the Heart (1924)
- Strong Winds (1924)
- The Heart of Lilian Thorland (1924)
- Chamber Music (1925)
- Tragedy (1925)
- The Adventures of Sybil Brent (1925)
- The Elegant Bunch (1925)
- The Doll of Luna Park (1925)
- The Morals of the Alley (1925)
- The Flower Girl of Potsdam Square (1925)
- Roses from the South (1926)
- The Last Horse Carriage in Berlin (1926)
- Only a Dancing Girl (1926)
- The Flames Lie (1926)
- When She Starts, Look Out (1926)
- The Trousers (1927)
- Nameless Woman (1927)
- Intoxicated Love (1927)
- U-9 Weddigen (1927)
- My Aunt, Your Aunt (1927)
- The Hunt for the Bride (1927)
- The Indiscreet Woman (1927)
- The Queen of Spades (1927)
- The Island of Forbidden Kisses (1927)
- Violantha (1928)
- Lotte (1928)
- The Weekend Bride (1928)
- The Most Beautiful Woman in Paris (1928)
- Latin Quarter (1929)
- The Night Belongs to Us (1929)
- Marriage in Trouble (1929)
- The Ship of Lost Souls (1929)
- The Mistress and her Servant (1929)
- Cyanide (1930)
- Fire in the Opera House (1930)
- The Widow's Ball (1930)
- Scandalous Eva (1930)
- Hans in Every Street (1930)
- Louise, Queen of Prussia (1931)
- Elisabeth of Austria (1931)
- Poor as a Church Mouse (1931)
- Victoria and Her Hussar (1931)
- The Soaring Maiden (1931)
- My Leopold (1931)
- 24 Hours in the Life of a Woman (1931)
- The True Jacob (1931)
- Gitta Discovers Her Heart (1932)
- I Do Not Want to Know Who You Are (1932)
- Love at First Sight (1932)
- Countess Mariza (1932)
- This One or None (1932)
- The Emperor's Waltz (1933)
- The Hymn of Leuthen (1933)
- Honour Among Thieves (1933)
- A Song Goes Round the World (1933)
- Homecoming to Happiness (1933)
- Ripening Youth (1933)
- The Grand Duke's Finances (1934)
- Trouble with Jolanthe (1934)
- Mother and Child (1934)
- Charley's Aunt (1934)
- I Was Jack Mortimer (1935)
- The Valley of Love (1935)
- The Dreamer (1936)
- When the Cock Crows (1936)
- The Abduction of the Sabine Women (1936)
- The Prisoner (1949)
- The Rabanser Case (1950)
- Taxi-Kitty (1950)
- The Lie (1950)
- Melody of Fate (1950)
- The Beautiful Galatea (1950)
- Thirteen Under One Hat (1950)
- The Lost One (1951)
- The Sinner (1951)
- Professor Nachtfalter (1951)
- Miracles Still Happen (1951)
- Queen of the Arena (1952)

== Bibliography ==
- Giesen, Rolf. Nazi Propaganda Films: A History and Filmography. McFarland, 2003.
