= List of Nazi propaganda films =

The following is a list of German National Socialist propaganda films. Before and during the Second World War, the Reich Ministry of Public Enlightenment and Propaganda under Joseph Goebbels produced several propaganda films designed for the general public. Production of films made to serve a propaganda purpose was not limited to the Axis powers, but was produced by both sides, such as the Allies' production of propaganda films.

The list of films may contain films concerning several different subjects or genres, but who all functioned as propaganda films of the Third Reich.

== Legend ==
Release date: The date of the film's release (or premiere)
Original title: The film's original German title
English title: English language title (titles in italic marks official English title)
Running time: Length of the film as released
Type: Genre and function
Producer: The producer(s) of the film
Director: The director(s) of the film
Cast: Leading actors and actresses
Notes: Additional comments and notes, such as propaganda use and post-war history.

== Before the War (1933–1939) ==
Release date	Original title	English title	Running time	Type	Producer	Director	Cast	Notes
1927	Eine Symphonie des Kampfwillens	A Symphony of the Will to Fight	30 min (ca.)	Documentary silent film	NSDAP	Julius Lippert	Adolf Hitler; NSDAP members Nuremberg Rally attendants	First documentary of a Nuremberg Rally.
1929	Der Nürnberger Parteitag der NSDAP	The Nuremberg Convention of the NSDAP	90 min (ca.)	Documentary silent film	NSDAP	Baldur von Schirach	NSDAP members Nuremberg Rally attendants Franz Ritter von Epp	Documents the 4th party convention of the NSDAP, which occurred at Nuremberg 2 August 1929
June 14, 1933	S.A.-Mann Brand	Storm Trooper Brand	94 min	Motion picture	Franz Seitz	Franz Seitz	Heinz Klingenberg; Wera Liessem; Rolf Wenkhaus	
September 19, 1933	Hitlerjunge Quex: Ein Film vom Opfergeist der deutschen Jugend	Hitler Youth Quex; Our Flag Leads Us Forward (US)	95 min	Feature film	Karl Ritter	Hans Steinhoff	Jürgen Ohlsen; Heinrich George; Berta Drews; Claus Clausen	Today classified as a Vorbehaltsfilm in Germany
1 December 1933	Der Sieg des Glaubens	The Victory of Faith	64 min	Documentary film	Leni Riefenstahl	Leni Riefenstahl	Adolf Hitler; Rudolf Hess; Hermann Göring; Julius Streicher; Joseph Goebbels; Ernst Röhm	First propaganda film directed by Riefenstahl. Recounts the Fifth Party Rally of the Nazi Party, which occurred in Nuremberg from 30 August to 3 September 1933.
8 December 1933	Flüchtlinge	"Refugees"	87 min	Feature film		Gustav Ucicky	Hans Albers; Käthe von Nagy; Eugen Klöpfer; Andrews Engelmann	
13 December 1933	Hans Westmar. Einer von vielen. Ein deutsches Schicksal aus dem Jahre 1929	"Hans Westmar. One of many. A German Fate from the Year 1929"	132 min	Feature film	Robert Ernst	Franz Wenzler	Emil Lohkamp; Paul Wegener	
28 December 1934	Um das Menschenrecht. Ein Filmwerk aus der Freikorpszeit	"About human rights"		Motion picture	Hans Zöberlein (executive)	Hans Zöberlein; Ludwig Schmid-Wildy	Hans Schlenck; Kurt Holm; Ernst Martens; Beppo Brem	Released as Sturmtage 1919 in Austria
24 January 1935	Nur nicht weich werden, Susanne! Eine Groteske aus vergangener Zeit	Don't Lose Heart, Suzanne!		Drama film		Arzén von Cserépy	Jessie Vihrog; Veit Harlan; Willi Schur; Hilde Krüger, etc.	
29 January 1935	Der alte und der junge König	The Old and the Young King	100 min	Historical film	Deka-Film GmbH	Hans Steinhoff	Emil Jannings; Leopoldine Konstantin	
28 March 1935	Triumph des Willens	Triumph of the Will	114 min	Documentary film	Leni Riefenstahl	Leni Riefenstahl	Adolf Hitler; Heinrich Himmler; Viktor Lutze other NSDAP leaders	Riefenstahl won several awards, not only in Germany but also in the United States, France, Sweden and other countries
26 April 1935	Das Mädchen Johanna	Joan of Arc	87 min	Historical film	Bruno Duday	Gustav Ucicky	Angela Salloker; Gustaf Gründgens; Heinrich George	First female personification of the Führer
19 November 1935	Friesennot	Frisions in Distress	97 min	Motion picture	Alfred Bittins; Dr. Scheunemann; Hermann Schmidt	Peter Hagen	Friedrich Kayßler; Helene Fehdmer; Valéry Inkijinoff	Reissued as Dorf im roten Sturm in Germany
30 December 1935	Der höhere Befehl	The Higher Command	93 min	Historical film	Bruno Duday	Gerhard Lamprecht	Lil Dagover; Karl Ludwig Diehl; Heli Finkenzeller; Friedrich Kayßler	Highlights German-British historical relations in an attempt to ensure an alliance with Great Britain.
30 December 1935	Tag der Freiheit: Unsere Wehrmacht	Day of Freedom: Our Armed Forces	28 min	Documentary film	Leni Riefenstahl	Leni Riefenstahl	Adolf Hitler; Hermann Göring; Rudolf Hess; Heinrich Himmler	Recounts the Seventh Party Rally of the Nazi Party, which occurred in Nuremberg on 10–16 September 1935.
1935	Das Erbe	The Inheritance	12 min	Short film	Harold Mayer	Carl Hartmann		
16 June 1936	Traumulus	The Dreamer	100 min	Drama film	Carl Froelich	Carl Froelich	Emil Jannings; Hilde Weissner; Harald Paulsen; Hildegard Barko	
16 June 1936	Ewiger Wald	Enchanted Forest	75 min	Documentary film	Hanns Springer; Rolf von Sonjevski-Jamrowski	Albert Graf von Pestalozza	Günther Hadank; Heinz Herkommer; Paul Klinger	
9 September 1936	Verräter	The Traitor	92 min	War drama film	Hans Ritter	Karl Ritter	Lída Baarová; Willy Birgel; Irene von Meyendorff	
1936	Erbkrank	The Hereditary Defective	25 min	Documentary short film		Herbert Gerdes		
5 January 1937	Panzerkreuzer Sebastopol: "Weisse Sklaven"	Battleship Sevastopol: "White Slaves"	111 min	War drama film		Karl Anton	Theodor Loos; Gabriele Hoffmann; Camilla Horn; Karl John	Rereleased as Rote Bestien (Red Beasts)
17 March 1937	Der Herrscher	The Master	103 min	Drama film		Veit Harlan	Emil Jannings; Paul Wagner; Hannes Stelzer	Propagandistic demonstration of the Führerprinzip of Nazi Germany.
1937	Alles Leben ist Kampf	All Life is Struggle	27 min	Documentary short film		Herbert Gerdes; W. Hüttig		
1937	Opfer der Vergangenheit: Die Sünde wider Blut und Rasse	Victims of the Past: The Sin against Blood and Race	25 min	Documentary short film		Gernot Bock-Stieber; Kurt Botner	Kurt Mühlhardt; Trude Haefelin; Max Lohmann	
1937	Festliches Nürnberg	Festive Nuremberg	21 min	Documentary short film			Adolf Hitler; Hermann Göring other NSDAP leaders	
11 January 1938	Urlaub auf Ehrenwort	Leave on Word of Honour	87 min	War drama film	Karl Ritter	Karl Ritter	Rolf Moebius; Fritz Kampers; Rene Deltgen; Otto Graf	
28 March 1938	Wort und Tat	Words and Deeds	10 min	Documentary short film		Fritz Hippler; Ottoheinz Jahn; Gustav Ucicky; Eugen York	Joseph Goebbels; Adolf Hitler; Benito Mussolini	
20 April 1938	Olympia	Olympia	226 min	Documentary film	Leni Riefenstahl	Leni Riefenstahl		Documenting the 1936 Summer Olympics, held in the Olympic Stadium in Berlin, Germany.
22 December 1938	Pour le Mérite	Pour le Mérite	121 min	War film		Karl Ritter	Paul Hartmann; Herbert A.E. Böhme; Albert Hehn	
8 March 1939	Aufruhr in Damaskus	Uproar in Damascus	103 min	Thriller film	Otto Lehmann	Gustav Ucicky	Brigitte Horney; Joachim Gottschalk; Hans Nielsen; Ernst von Klipstein	
7 July 1939	Robert und Bertram	Robert and Bertram	86 min	Musical comedy film	Helmut Schreiber	Hans Heinz Zerlett	Rudi Godden; Kurt Seifert; Carla Rust; Fritz Kampers	
10 August 1939	Der Westwall	"The Westwall"	46 min	Documentary film		Fritz Hippler		
5 September 1939	Kadetten	Cadets	94 min	Historical war film	Karl Ritter	Karl Ritter	Mathias Wieman; Carsta Löck; Andrews Engelmann; Theo Shall	General release was 2 December 1941 due to its anti-Russian theme following the Nazi-Soviet Pact.

== Wartime films (1939–1945) ==
Release date	Original title	English title	Running time	Type	Producer	Director	Cast	Notes
16 October 1939	Leinen aus Irland	Linen from Ireland	98 min	Drama film		Heinz Helbig	Otto Treßler; Irene von Meyendorff; Friedl Haerlin	
26 October 1939	D III 88	D III 88	109 min	Action drama film	Fred Lyssa	Herbert Maisch; Hans Bertram	Christian Kayßler; Otto Wernicke; Heinz Welzel; Hermann Braun	
8 February 1940	Feldzug in Polen	The Campaign in Poland	69 min	Documentary film		Fritz Hippler	Adolf Hitler	
February 1940	Der Marsch zum Führer	The March to the Führer	45 min	Documentary film			Rudolf Hess; Adolf Hitler; Baldur von Schirach	Documents the nationwide march of Hitler Youth to Nuremberg for the Nazi Party Rally.
5 April 1940	Feuertaufe	Baptism by Fire	90 min	Documentary film		Hans Bertram	Herbert Gernot; Hermann Göring; Adolf Hitler	Showed to ambassadors from the Scandinavian countries on the eve of Operation Weserübung. Documents the destruction of Polish cities by the Luftwaffe.
24 April 1940	Der Fuchs von Glenarvon	The Fox of Glenarvon	91 min	Motion picture	Herbert Engelsing	Max W. Kimmich	Olga Chekhova; Karl Ludwig Diehl; Ferdinand Marian; Elisabeth Flickenschildt	
24 April 1940	Der Postmeister	The Postmaster/The Station Master	92 min	Drama film		Gustav Ucicky	Heinrich George; Hilde Krahl; Siegfried Breuer	
17 July 1940	Die Rothschilds	The Rothschilds	97 min	Motion picture	C.M. Köhn	Erich Waschneck	Erich Ponto; Carl Kuhlmann; Herbert Hübner	
24 September 1940	Jud Süß	Süss the Jew	98 min	Drama film	Otto Lehmann	Veit Harlan	Ferdinand Marian; Werner Krauss; Heinrich George; Kristina Söderbaum	
1 November 1940	Das Herz der Königin	The Heart of the Queen	112 min	Historical film	Carl Froelich	Carl Froelich	Zarah Leander	
28 November 1940	Der Ewige Jude	The Eternal Jew	62 min	Fiction/Documentary film	Deutsche Film Gesellschaft	Fritz Hippler	Harry Giese	
6 December 1940	Bismarck	Bismarck	118 min	Historical film	Heinrich Jonen; Willi Wiesner	Wolfgang Liebeneiner	Paul Hartmann; Friedrich Kayßler; Lil Dagover	
30 December 1940	Wunschkonzert	Request Concert	103 min	Drama film	Felix Pfitzner	Eduard von Borsody	Ilse Werner; Carl Raddatz; Joachim Brennecke	
1940	Vom Bäumlein, das andere Blätter hat gewollt	"Of the little tree which wished for different leaves"	7 min	Short cartoon	Hubert Schonger	Heinz Tischmeyer		
1940	Kampf um Norwegen – Feldzug 1940	Battle for Norway - 1940 Campaign	81 min	Documentary film		Martin Rikli; Werner Buhre		Never screened. Assumed lost until copy resurfaced in 2006.
1940–1945	Die Deutsche Wochenschau	The German Weekly Review		Unified newsreel series				
17 February 1941	Mein Leben für Irland	My Life for Ireland	90 min	Motion picture		Max W. Kimmich	Anna Dammann; René Deltgen; Paul Wegener; Werner Hinz	
28 February 1941	Kampfgeschwader Lützow	Fighting Squadron Lützow	109 min	War film		Hans Bertram	Christian Kayßler; Hermann Braun; Heinz Welzel	Classified as a Vorbehaltsfilm today in Germany
21 March 1941	Über alles in der Welt	Above All Else in the World	85 min	Drama film	Karl Ritter	Karl Ritter	Paul Hartmann; Hannes Stelzer; Fritz Kampers	
21 March 1941	Carl Peters	Carl Peters	110 min	Historical drama film		Herbert Selpin	Hans Albers	
23 March 1941	Sieg im Westen	Victory in the West	114 min	Documentary film	Fritz Hippler	Svend Noldan	Erwin Rommel; Adolf Hitler	
4 April 1941	Ohm Krüger	Uncle Krüger	135 min	Biographical film	Emil Jannings	Hans Steinhoff	Emil Jannings; Lucie Höflich; Werner Hinz	
17 April 1941	Liebe ist zollfrei	Love is Duty Free		Comedy film		Emerich Walter Emo	Hans Moser; Susi Peter; Theodor Danegger	
27 June 1941	Stukas	Stukas	101 min	Motion picture		Karl Ritter	Carl Raddatz; Hannes Stelzer; Ernst von Klipstein	Staatsauftragsfilm
9 May 1941	U-Boote westwärts!	U-boat Westward!	98 min	Motion picture		Günther Rittau	Herbert Wilk	
4 June 1941	Venus vor Gericht	Venus on Trial	90 min	Drama film	Ottmar Ostermayr	Hans H. Zerlett	Hannes Stelzer; Hansi Knoteck; Paul Dahlke; Siegfried Breuer	
29 August 1941	Ich klage an	I Accuse	125 min	Drama film		Wolfgang Liebeneiner	Heidemarie Hatheyer; Paul Hartmann; Mathias Wieman	
31 August 1941	Heimkehr	Homecoming	94 min	Drama film	Karl Hartl; Wien-Film	Gustav Ucicky	Paula Wessely; Attila Hörbiger; Carl Raddatz	
19 December 1941	Menschen im Sturm	People in the Storm	80 min	Drama film		Fritz Peter Buch	Gustav Diessl; Olga Chekhova; Hannelore Schroth	Propaganda to justify an invasion of Slovenia
3 March 1942	Der große König	The Great King	118 min	Drama film		Veit Harlan	Otto Gebühr	
12 June 1942	Die große Liebe	The Great Love	100 min	Drama film	Walter Bolz for Universum Film AG	Rolf Hansen	Zarah Leander; Viktor Staal	The most commercially successful film in the history of the Third Reich.
14 August 1942	G.P.U.	The Red Terror	99 min	Action film	Karl Ritter	Karl Ritter	Laura Solari; Will Quadflieg; Marina von Ditmar	
25 August 1942	Anschlag auf Baku	Attack on Baku	91 min	Thriller film	Hans Weidemann	Fritz Kirchhoff	Willy Fritsch; René Deltgen; Fritz Kampers; Hans Zesch-Ballot	
25 August 1942	Der 5. Juni	5 June	99 min	War film	Walter Ulbrich	Fritz Kirchhoff	Carl Raddatz; Joachim Brennecke; Karl Ludwig Diehl; Gisela Uhlen	
3 September 1942	Die goldene Stadt	"The Golden City"	110 min	Drama film	Veit Harlan	Veit Harlan; Wolfgang Schleif	Kristina Söderbaum; Eugen Klöpfer; Annie Rosar	
9 September 1941	Annelie	Annelie	99 min	Drama film		Josef von Báky	Luise Ullrich; Werner Krauss; Käthe Haack	Portrays the National Socialist woman
6 October 1942	Die Entlassung	Bismarck's Dismissal	110 min	Biographical film	Emil Jannings; Fritz Klotsch; Walter Lehmann	Wolfgang Liebeneiner	Emil Jannings; Margarete Schön; Christian Kayßler	Also known as Schicksalswende (West German rerun title) and Wilhelm II. und Bismarck (new West German title)
3 March 1943	Münchhausen	Münchhausen	105 min	Fantasy comedy film	Eberhard Schmidt	Josef von Báky	Hans Albers; Wilhelm Bendow	
26 August 1943	Wien 1910	Vienna 1910	92 min	Biographical film		Emerich Walter Emo	Rudolf Forster; Heinrich George; Lil Dagover	
10 November 1943	Titanic	Titanic	85 min	Drama film	Willy Reiber	Herbert Selpin; Werner Klingler	Sybille Schmitz; Hans Nielsen	
November 1943	Besatzung Dora	The Crew of the Dora	91 min	Drama war film		Karl Ritter	Josef Dahmen; Hannes Stelzer	
6 July 1944	Die Degenhardts	The Degenhardts	93 min	Drama film	Heinrich George	Werner Klingler	Heinrich George; Ernst Schröder; Gunnar Möller	
8 December 1944	Opfergang	Rite of Sacrifice	98 min	Drama film		Veit Harlan	Kristina Söderbaum; Carl Raddatz; Irene von Meyendorff	
1944	Theresienstadt. Ein Dokumentarfilm aus dem jüdischen Siedlungsgebiet	Theresienstadt: A Documentary Film from the Jewish Settlement Area	90 min (ca.)	Documentary short film	Karel Pečený (Aktualita Prag) for the SS-Central Office for the Settlement of the Jewish Question in Bohemia and Moravia	Kurt Gerron (under Hans Günther & Karl Rahm)		Only 22 minutes of footage extant.
1944	Panorama	Panorama		Newsreel series				Quarterly colour newsreel series
30 January 1945	Kolberg	Kolberg	110 min	Historical film	Veit Harlan	Veit Harlan	Kristina Söderbaum; Heinrich George; Paul Wegener; Horst Caspar	

== See also ==
- de:Liste der am höchsten prädikatisierten NS-Spielfilme
- de:Liste der unter alliierter Militärzensur verbotenen deutschen Filme
