= Outline of public relations =

Overview of and topical guide to public relations

The following outline is provided as an overview of and topical guide to public relations:

Public relations – practice of managing the spread of information between an individual or an organization (such as a business, government agency, or a nonprofit organization) and the public.

== Nature of public relations ==
Public relations can be described as all of the following:

- Academic discipline – branch of knowledge that is taught and researched at the college or university level. Disciplines are defined (in part), and recognized by the academic journals in which research is published, and the learned societies and academic departments or faculties to which their practitioners belong.
- Communication – activity of conveying information
- Marketing – process which creates, communicates, and delivers value to the customer, and maintains the relationship with customers.

=== Essence of public relations ===
- To create and sustain "shared meaning" or "common understanding" - NB this may be and usually is different from "shared beliefs"
- Propaganda: the general propagation of information for a specific purpose
- Psychological warfare:
  - Psyops
- Public relations: techniques used to influence the publics' perception of an organization
- Publicity: PR techniques used to promote a specific product or brand
  - Spin (public relations)
  - Spin: both the objective of a PR campaign and the act of obtaining that objective

=== Public relations methods and approaches ===
- Airborne leaflet propaganda
- Astroturfing and Astroturf PR: fake grassroots
- Atrocity story
- Bandwagon effect
- Big lie
- Black propaganda
- Buzzword
- Card stacking
- Code word
- Communist propaganda
- Corporate image
- Corporate propaganda
- Cult of personality
- Demonization
- Disinformation: providing false information
- Dog-whistle politics
- Doublespeak
- Enterperience: fusing entertainment and experience together
- Euphemisms, as done deliberately to advance a cause or position (see also Political correctness)
- Factoid
- Fedspeak
- Front organization
- Glittering generality
- Homophobic propaganda
- Indoctrination
- Information warfare: the practice of disseminating information in an attempt to advance your agenda relative to a competing viewpoint
- Junk science
- Lesser of two evils principle
- Loaded language
- Marketing: commercial and business techniques
- Media bias
- Media manipulation: the attempt to influence broadcast media decisions in an attempt to present your view to a mass audience
- Misuse of statistics
- News management: PR techniques concerned with the news media
- News propaganda
- Newspeak
- Plain folks
- Propaganda film
- Public service announcement
- Revolutionary propaganda
- Self propaganda
- Social marketing: techniques used in behavioral change, such as health promotion
- Sound science
- Rebuttal: a type of news management technique
- Rhetoric
- Slogan
- Transfer (propaganda)
- Video news release
- Weasel Word
- White propaganda
- Yellow journalism

== Theory of public relations ==
- Agenda-setting theory
- Framing (social sciences)
- Propaganda model: a model developed by Noam Chomsky and Edward S. Herman to explain how propaganda functions in democracies

== History of public relations ==
- History of public relations

=== Historical uses of propaganda ===
==== By country ====
- Propaganda in India
- Propaganda in the People's Republic of China
- Propaganda in the People's Republic of Poland
- Propaganda in the Republic of China
- Propaganda in Rwanda
- Propaganda in the Soviet Union
- Propaganda in the United States

==== Miscellany ====
- Congregation for the Evangelization of Peoples
- Department for Agitation and Propaganda
- Operation Mockingbird
- Propaganda during the Reformation
- Propaganda in the War in Somalia
- Public relations preparations for 2003 invasion of Iraq
- Role of the media in the Yugoslav wars
- Socialist Propaganda League

==== World War II ====
- American propaganda during World War II
- British propaganda during World War II
- Propaganda in the Republic of China
- Soviet propaganda during World War II
- Walt Disney's World War II Propaganda Production

===== Britain =====
  - List of British propaganda films of World War II
- Fougasse
- Ministry of Information

===== Nazi Germany =====
====== People ======
- Norman Baillie-Stewart (Radio broadcaster, 1939-1942)
- Robert Henry Best (Radio broadcaster, 1942)
- Elsa Bruckmann (Propagandist to industrialists)
- Hugo Bruckmann
- Franz Burri (Disseminator of Nazi propaganda in Switzerland)
- Otto Dietrich (Press chief)
- Constance Drexel (Radio broadcaster)
- Hermann Esser (First Nazi Chief of Propaganda)
- Arnold Fanck (Film director)
- Paul Ferdonnet (Radio broadcaster)
- Walter Frentz (Photographer and film producer)
- Hans Fritzsche (Holder of various posts in the Ministry for Public Enlightenment and Propaganda)
- Walther Funk (State Secretary for the Ministry for Public Enlightenment and Propaganda, 1933–1938)
- Hermann Gauch
- Herbert Gerdes
- Karl Gerland
- Mildred Gillars
- Joseph Goebbels
- Hans F. K. Günther
- Eugen Hadamovsky
- Ernst Hanfstaengl
- Karl Hanke
- Thea von Harbou
- Veit Harlan
- Fritz Hippler
- Heinrich Hoffmann
- Raymond Davies Hughes
- Emil Jannings
- William Joyce
- Fred W. Kaltenbach (Radio broadcaster)
- Emil Kirdorf
- Fritz Julius Kuhn
- Johann von Leers
- Wolfgang Liebeneiner
- Lord Haw-Haw
- Horst von Möllendorff
- Martin James Monti
- Werner Naumann
- Elisabeth Noelle-Neumann
- Wilfred von Oven
- Leni Riefenstahl
- Alfred Rosenberg
- Fritz Rössler
- Gregor Schwartz-Bostunitsch
- Albert Speer
- Julius Streicher
- Eberhard Taubert

====== Organisations ======
- Charlie and his Orchestra
- Department of Film
- Gaubildstelle (Office of Slides)
- Ministry of Public Enlightenment and Propaganda (Reichsministerium für Volksaufklärung und Propaganda or Propagandaministerium, or RNVP)

====== Campaigns and events ======
- Operation Himmler
- Nuremberg Rallies
- Sportpalast speech

====== Media ======
- The Eternal Jew (Fritz Hippler, 1940)
- Triumph of the Will (Leni Riefenstahl, 1935)

== Public relations organizations ==
- Ad Council
- Bureau of International Information Programs
- Institute for Propaganda Analysis
- Ministry of propaganda
- United States Information Agency
- Shared values initiative - Council of American Muslims for Understanding

== Public relations media ==
- "Al Fateh"
- America's Army, video game produced by the U.S. government with the stated aim of encouraging players to become interested in joining the U.S. Army.

== Works about public relations and propaganda ==
=== Books ===
- Manufacturing Consent: The Political Economy of the Mass Media by Edward S. Herman and Noam Chomsky
- Propaganda by Edward Bernays
- Propaganda: The Formation of Men's Attitudes by Jacques Ellul
- Public Opinion by Walter Lippmann

=== Film ===
- Wag the Dog

== See also ==
- List of cognitive biases
- List of common misconceptions
- List of fallacies
- List of memory biases
- Straight and Crooked Thinking – Book by Robert H. Thouless (book)
