= Nazism and cinema =

Nazi influence on film between 1933–1945

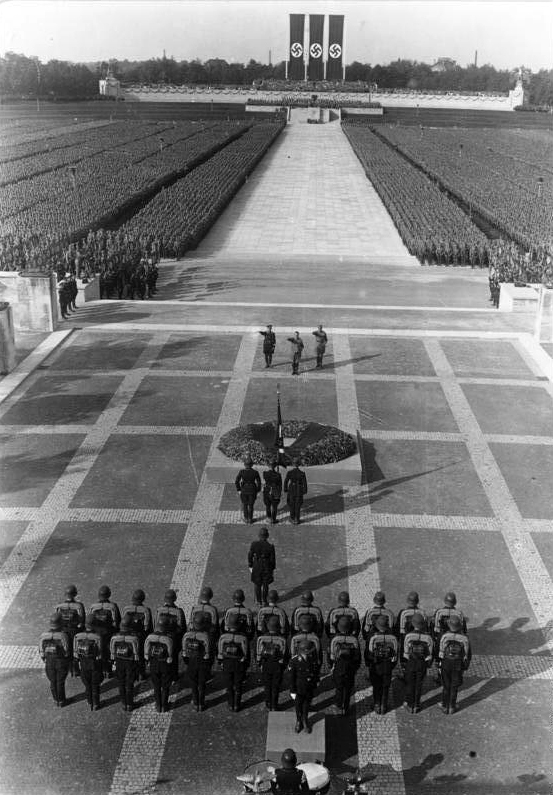
The Totenehrung (honouring of dead) at the 1934 Nuremberg Rally. SS leader Heinrich Himmler, Adolf Hitler and SA leader Viktor Lutze (from L to R) on the stone terrace; from Triumph of the Will, directed by Leni Riefenstahl.

Nazism made extensive use of the cinema throughout its history. Though it was a relatively new technology, the Nazi Party established a film department soon after it rose to power in Germany. Both Adolf Hitler and his propaganda minister, Joseph Goebbels, used the many Nazi films to promote the party ideology and show their influence in the burgeoning art form, which was an object of personal fascination for Hitler.

The Nazis valued film as a propaganda instrument of enormous power, courting the masses by means of slogans that were aimed directly at the instincts and emotions of the people. The Department of Film also used the economic power of German moviegoers to influence the international film market. This resulted in almost all Hollywood producers censoring films critical of Nazism during the 1930s, as well as showing news shorts produced by the Nazis in American theaters. The exception was Warner Brothers, the lone American production company without a partnership with the Nazis. The company had pulled out of Germany in 1934, after one of its Jewish employees was assaulted in Germany.

== Goals of the Nazi film policy ==
Goebbels, who appointed himself "Patron of the German film", believed that a national cinema which was entertaining and put glamour on the government would be a more effective propaganda instrument than a national cinema in which the NSDAP and their policy would have been ubiquitous. Goebbels emphasized the will to end the "shamelessness and tastelessness" that he thought could be found in the former movie industry. The main goal of the Nazi film policy was to promote escapism, which was designed to distract the population and to keep everybody in good spirits; Goebbels indeed blamed defeat in World War I on the failure to sustain the morale of the people.

For conceiving a Nazi film theory, Goebbels suggested as formative material the Hamburg Dramaturgy and Laokoon, or the Limitations of Poetry by Gotthold Ephraim Lessing, and also demanded "realistic characters" pointing to Shakespeare. Goebbels emphasized Lessing's idea that "not only imagining per se, but purposeful imagining, would prove the creative mind".

A system of "award" was used to encourage self-censorship; awarded for such things as "cultural value" or "value to the people", they remitted part of the heavy taxes on films. Up to a third of the films in Nazi Germany received such awards.

== History ==
Film production and earnings
Year	Films produced	Total RM cost	Tickets sold (M.)	Gross RM receipts (M.)
1932			238.4	176.4
1933	114	28.5	244.9	176.3
1934	129	32.5	259.4	194.6
1935	92	36.3	303.9	230.9
1936	112	50.7	361.6	282.1
1937	94	50.5	394.4	309.2
1938	93		441.6	353.3
1939	107		623.7	476.9
1940	85		834.1	650
1941	67		892.3	725.7
1942	58		1,062.1	894.2
1943	76		1,116.5	958.6
1944	60		1,101.7	951.3
1945	6			

=== Pre-seizure of power ===
The Nazis were very aware of the propagandistic effect of movies and already in 1920 the issues of the Racial Observer included film criticism. The SS-philosopher Walter Julius Bloem published the book The Soul of the Cinema – A Commitment to the Movies in 1922. A comprehensive critique of the film industry was published by the Nazi economist Hans Buchner in 1927 with the title "Spellbound by Movies. The Global Dominance of the Cinema".

A Symphony of the Will to Fight, the first film officially produced by the Nazis, was a coverage of the 1927 Nuremberg rally. Nazi activity was later filmed by UFA GmbH, which was acquired by Alfred Hugenberg in 1927.

The Nationalist Socialist Film Service was created in November 1928, and local parties were required to have film projectors starting in 1929. Goebbels established an organization to distribute Nazi films in 1930, but did not receive proper financial backing. Film production and distribution were instead handled by Gauleiters. In 1932, ten Landesfilmstellen (LES) were formed to distribute films created by the Nazi Film Service.

Hugenberg, who controlled UFA, joined the Harzburg Front with the Nazis in 1931. He supported Hitler during his rise to power and was appointed Reich Minister of Economics in 1933. He used his power over UFA to make it produce films aligned with the Nazis.

=== Takeover ===
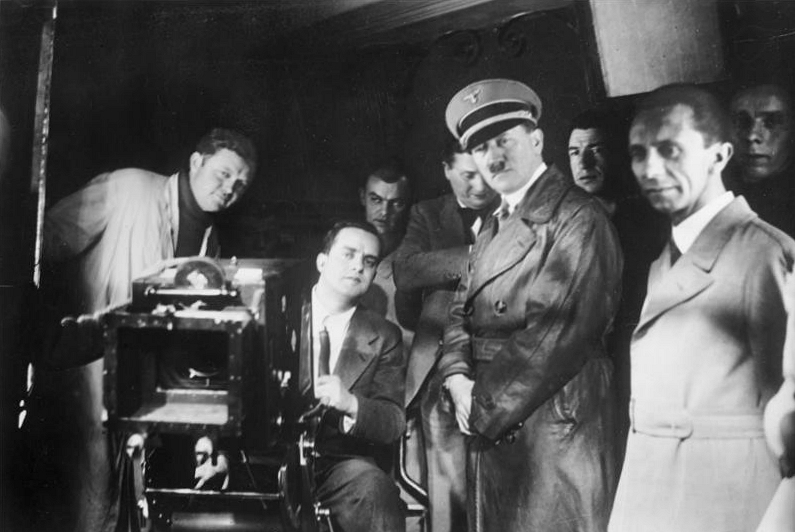
Adolf Hitler, Joseph Goebbels, and others watch filming at Ufa, 1935.

On 9 February 1933, Nazi members of the German Cinema Owners' Association demanded that Adolf Engl be appointed leader. The entire board resigned on 18 March, and gave Engl and the Nazis control over the organization.

The Film Credit Bank, formed on 1 June 1933, gave the Nazis financial control over film production as independent producers became dependent on its backing. The Reich Chamber of Film was formed on 14 July, and was later included as one of the seven organizations in the Reich Chamber of Culture. The Film Credit Bank was financing over 73% of feature films by 1936. The Reich Cinema Law, enacted on 1 March 1934, required all film scripts to be approved by a Nazi film advisor.

Film trade magazines were restricted and placed under government control. Goebbels replaced the editor of Film-Kurier with Luitpold Nusser, a leader of the film press division in the Nazi's propaganda office, on 5 April 1933. The publisher of Der Film, the oldest weekly trade magazine for film, was replaced by people aligned with the Nazis.

The position of Reichsfilmdramaturg was created in February 1934, with Willi Krause, a film reviewer for Der Angriff, as its inaugural holder; Hans-Jürgen Nierentz replaced Krause on 1 April 1936. The position was in charge of censoring films in production. A new film degree made on 16 February 1934 made it so that all censors were appointed by Goebbels. Fritz Hippler, the director of The Eternal Jew, was placed in charge of the film section of the Reich Ministry of Public Enlightenment and Propaganda (RMVP).

On 21 December 1934, the Reichsfilmkammer required all cameramen to be members of a government film organization; this policy eliminated foreign newsreels. A law was passed in 1938 which required newsreels to be played before all commercial film showings. All of the newsreel companies were merged into Die Deutsche Wochenschau on 21 November 1940.

German film exports fell as they could not reach screen quotas due to Nazi policies to reduce foreign film imports and widespread censorship inhibiting distributors who wanted to import films. The international box office accounted for 40% of German film earnings during the silent era and was at 30% in 1932, but fell to 11% for 1934–1935. On 8 June 1935, all foreign film distribution was centralized within the Propaganda Ministry. Foreign sales fell from RM 22 million in 1930 to RM 12 million in 1932 and RM 4 million in 1936. State subsidies to the film industry resulted in improved production values: average film production costs quintupled from 250,000 ℛℳ in 1933 (equivalent to €1,158,873 in 2021) to 1,380,000 ℛℳ in 1942 (equivalent to €5,785,574 in 2021). Ticket sales within the Reich quadrupled from 250 million in 1933 to more than a billion in 1942. Overall film attendance rose from 100 million in 1933 to 333 million in 1936, but higher production costs and losing foreign exports caused German film companies to become unprofitable. UFA had a RM 12–15 million deficit in 1936.

Max Winkler oversaw the elimination of economic roadblocks to the nationalization of the film industry. UFA and Tobis Film, who were financially struggling in 1936, now had the majority of their stock controlled by Cautio Trust Company, created by Winkler. Kautio purchased all of UFA's stock for RM 29 million on 19 March 1937, Tobis in May, Terra Film in August, and Bavaria Film was also acquired. Austria and Czechoslovakia's film industries were nationalized into Wien-Film and Prag Film following their annexations by Germany. On 10 January 1942, UFA-Film GmbH (UFI) was formed as a giant holding company for the entire German film industry. UFI was a vertically integrated monopoly, covering the entire European film market under German hegemony, with foreign imports cut off.

=== Propaganda ===
Film showings and attendance for the Hitler Youth
Year	Showings	Attendance
1934–1935		300,000
1935–1936	905	425,176
1936–1937	1,725	897,839
1937–1938	3,563	1,771,236
1938–1939	4,886	2,562,489
1939–1940	8,244	3,538,224
1940–1941	12,560	4,800,000
1941–1942	15,800	5,600,000
1942–1943	>45,290	11,215,000

An extensive system of educational film hire services existed under the Weimar Republic and which was extended under the Nazi administration. In 1943, there were 37 regional services and 12,042 city services. The Hitler Youth of Cologne started Film Hour for the Young (Jugendfilmstunde), in which members were shown propaganda films, on 20 April 1934, and this expanded nationally to a weekly basis in 1936. Reich Minister of Science, Education and Culture Bernhard Rust issued an order requiring political films showed in classrooms. The National Institute for School Films was replaced by the Office of Educational Films, an organisation with 30 state offices and 1,007 district offices; by 1936 there were 70,000 schools with 16mm projectors and 227 films commissioned for use in schools.

One-sixth of the 1,097 feature films produced between 1933 and 1945 were overt propaganda films. The majority of these films were financed by the RMVP's film section. The number of political films produced declined as World War II continued as Goebbels sought to distract the populace from the war.

The Nazis produced three feature-length propaganda films about the party's rise to power in 1933. These were S.A.-Mann Brand, Hitlerjunge Quex, and Hans Westmar. Goebbels praised The Rebel as what Nazi filmmakers should aspire to. Goebbels wanted film propaganda to be done using subtle methods, but Triumph of the Will, which was the opposite of this belief, was produced against Goebbels' wishes.

When the Nazis came to power in 1933, they investigated the family background of Max Skladanowsky to determine if they were Polish Jews. Because Skladanowsky was of non-Jewish origins, he was elevated by the Nazis as a great German cinema innovator. On May 4 1933, an event at Berlin's Atrium cinema honoring Skladanowsky's contributions to German cinema was attended by Joseph Goebbels and in 1935 Adolf Hitler attended a private screening of a Skladanowsky film. Skladanowsky was fully supportive of the Nazis, adding "Heil Hitler!" to many of his letters and describing the Bioskop as a non-Jewish and therefore authentically German invention. Skladanowsky's support for the Nazi embrace of his work came during a time of poverty and may have been motivated by profit. The Nazis had some ambivalence about his work due to his Polish ancestry and because he had fabricated some of his chronology to exaggerate his influence and by the time of his death in 1939 the Nazis interest in his work had declined.

The foundation of the Wehrmacht in 1935 resulted in an increase of films centred around the military.

Frisians in Peril (1935) was pulled shortly before the Molotov–Ribbentrop Pact due to its anti-Soviet message. Cadets (1939), an anti-Russian film, was finished in 1939, but was not released until 1941 due to Germany's favorable position towards the Soviet Union.

Death Over Shanghai, which was released four weeks before the Nazi rise to power, was re-edited into a pro-Japanese film. Another pro-Japanese film, Port Arthur, was made in 1936.

The United Kingdom's status in Nazi propaganda fluctuated. The Higher Command from 1935 depicted the British and Prussian allied military effort against Napoleon. The Traitor from 1936 depicted British agents as the enemies of German rearmament. The Rothschilds from 1940 had a negative depiction of Arthur Wellesley, 1st Duke of Wellington. The Nazis made the pro-Irish The Fox of Glenarvon and My Life for Ireland during World War II.

=== International ===
Around 500 films were exported to the United States between 1933 and 1942. The 79th Street Theater in Yorkville, Manhattan only showed films from Germany. Casino Film Exchange was one of the largest American importers of German and Austrian films in the 1930s, operated a theatre in Yorkville, and presented the films to German-Americans across the country.

French films were the most common foreign film in Spain prior to the Spanish Civil War. A cooperative agreement was signed between Spain and Germany in 1938. The Barber of Seville (1938) was the first project after this agreement. German film distribution to Spain was later used to expand into Latin America.

=== World War II and fall of Nazism ===
MGM was ordered to close all of its offices in Germany on 14 August 1940, and Paramount, the last American company with German distribution, was removed from Germany on 7 September 1941. American films were provided to Goebbels through the embassies of neutral countries.

Newsreel and film production was hampered by petrol and potassium nitrate shortages in 1944. Goebbels dissolved the departments for theatre, music, and the visual arts in the Propaganda Ministry. Cultural and advertising film production was ended as well.

The Soviet Union dismantled Ufa within its occupation zone and created the state-owned DEFA to manage a film monopoly in East Germany. East Germany held the major studios of Berlin, such as Babelsberg Studio and Johannisthal Studios, while Geiselgasteig studio in Munich became one of the film centres of West Germany. All Ufa property was liquidated in the American and British occupation zones on 7 September 1949.

The war had destroyed a large number of Germany's cinemas. Only 10 of Munich's 80 theatres and 100 of Bavaria's 500 theatres were still operating in January 1946. The number of theatres rose to 1,848 in the British zone, 1,268 in the American zone, and 450 in the French zone.

== Censorship ==
All Quiet on the Western Front was so upsetting to Nazi officials watching the screening in Berlin in December 1930 that it was stopped mid-screening and many edits had to be made before it could be re-released. Universal scrapped all scenes that portrayed Germans in a negative light, and the Germans agreed to screen the film again only if Universal released the censored version worldwide as well.

Using the significant economic power of German moviegoers to self-censor films globally, resulting in all but one Hollywood producers censoring films critical of Nazism and even showing news shorts of film produced by the Nazis in American theaters. No American films that were made between 1933 and 1939 were critical of Nazism, including those released domestically. Warner Brothers, the lone US production company without a partnership with the Nazis, had pulled out of Germany in 1934 after one of its Jewish employees was assaulted in Germany. Paramount Pictures, Metro-Goldwyn-Mayer and Fox Film all kept working with the German market, in part because their revenue was often frozen in German banks and not released right away. Fox and Paramount even collaborated on news reels with the Nazis that were shipped all around the world, in the hopes of getting their frozen assets back.

Warner Brothers released the first film with a plot critical of Nazis, Confessions of a Nazi Spy, in May 1939; the film also fueled unfounded fears of Jewish refugees acting as Nazi spies and contributed to the further restriction of Jewish refugees from Europe. Hollywood's presence started to come under increasing scrutiny after Kristallnacht in 1938, and a wholesale retreat from the country took place in mid-1940, in part because of declining sales in Germany.

These new incentives put in place by the Nazis led to Universal scrapping a project about the sinking of the Lusitania and delaying its sequel to All Quiet on the Western Front to 1936. When production started on The Road Back, all the actors received a letter from Goebbels' emissary in Los Angeles, Georg Gyssling, that none of them would be able to work on projects shown in Germany. Despite the uproar that ensued, the production was completed after 21 preemptive cuts were made, including a sanitized ending that made the world, not Germany, seem culpable for militarism. However, Universal was still blacklisted in Germany. The Nazis insisted on edits to the Warner Brothers film Captured! that showed poor treatment of prisoners at the hands of Germans, and further punished the studio even after they acquiesced by blocking subsequent releases that were expected to perform well in Germany. MGM's cancellation of the anti-Nazi movie Are We Civilized? led to a dozen of their films being approved a week later. The Mad Dog of Europe, one of the first attempts to dramatize Hitler, was dissuaded from going further by the MPAA in 1933, who worried that all American films would be banned in Germany in retaliation.

Goebbels also kept lists of which actors and crew were Jewish or anti-Nazi and refused to import films on which they worked. Georg Gyssling kept an eye on Hollywood scripts and activities, including writing letters to Will H. Hays' office when he found something that he or his bosses did not approve of.

On 13 May 1936, Goebbels banned critics having writing negative reviews published on the same day as the exhibition. He later banned all negative and positive reviews on November 27; all future reviews would simply be descriptive. Critics were required to obtain a license from the Reich Chamber of Culture.

=== Jews ===
Jews were banned from the film industry in 1933 under the Aryan paragraph. Hans Hinkel was tasked by Goebbels with removing all Jewish influence from the film industry. Weimar-era films which had Jewish people involved in the production were renamed and had those people removed from the credits. Warner Bros. closed its German affiliate rather than follow Nazi policies on Jews and Universal Pictures' German affiliate, Deutsche Universal, was moved to Vienna and then to Budapest.

Censorship of films starring Jewish people was limited in the initial years of the Nazi government. The Rise of Catherine the Great starring Jewish actress Elisabeth Bergner was released in Germany in 1934. Goebbels declined to take action against the film as the international press was too aware of the film and demonstrations against it were suppressed by Hitler and Ernst Röhm. The Prizefighter and the Lady (1933) starring Jewish boxer Max Baer was not restricted in order to avoid an international incident with the United States; Goebbels wrote an editorial in Der Angriff asking readers to accept the film. The subtitled version was released in Germany, but the dubbed version was denied a screening license. MGM filed an appeal against the restriction, but this resulted in both versions being banned. Multiple Americans films such as The Kid (1921), The Trial of Mary Dugan (1929), My Weakness (1933), Roman Scandals (1933), Tarzan and His Mate (1934), Manhattan Melodrama (1934), Stand Up and Cheer! (1934), Baby Take a Bow (1934), Nana (1934), and Men in White (1934) were banned. All German films made before 1933 featuring Jewish actors were banned on 8 June 1935.

== Star system ==
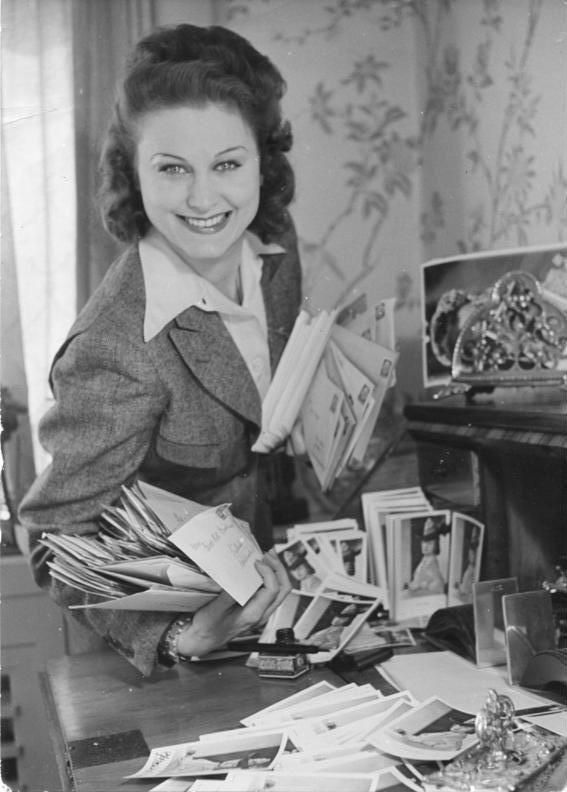
Marika Rökk with fan mail, c. 1940

There always had been film stars in Germany, but a star system comparable to the star system in Hollywood did not yet exist. Nazi leaders denounced the star system as a Jewish invention. However, in order to improve the image of Nazi Germany, Goebbels made great efforts to form a star system. After Marlene Dietrich and Greta Garbo had gone to Hollywood and could not be persuaded to serve the National Socialist film industry as figureheads, new film stars were promoted.

The best-known example is the Swedish actress Zarah Leander who was hired in 1937 by Ufa and became the most prominent and highest-paid German film star in only a few years. The publicity campaign for Leander was run by the press office of the Ufa, which concealed her past as a film actress already well known in Sweden and put their money right away on her charisma as a singer with an exceptionally deep voice. The Ufa press office provided the newspapers with detailed instructions on how the new star would have to be presented, and even the actress herself had to follow detailed instructions whenever she appeared in public. This kind of star publicity had not existed in Germany before.

Prominent politicians such as Hitler, Goebbels, and Hermann Göring appeared in public flanked by popular German film actors. The female stars in particular were expected to lend some glamour to the dry and male-dominated NSDAP events. Hitler's preferred dinner partners were the actresses Olga Chekhova and Lil Dagover, and from 1935, Hermann Göring was married to the popular actress Emmy Sonnemann. The relationships of Goebbels to several female film stars are also notorious. Magda Goebbels left a screening of the film Die Reise nach Tilsit, because it seemed to her too close a telling of her husband's relationship with Lída Baarová, which had resulted in the actress being sent back to her native Czechoslovakia.

Personal proximity to the political leaders became a determining factor for the career success of film actors. An informal system of listings decided how frequently an actor would be cast. The five categories extended from "to cast at all costs even without a vacancy" (for instance Zarah Leander, Lil Dagover, Heinz Rühmann) to "casting under no circumstances welcome".

How crucial the film stars were for the image of the National Socialist government is also evident from the tax benefits that Hitler decreed in 1938 for prominent film actors and directors. From that time on, they could deduct 40% of their income as professional expenses.

The Nazi film theorist Fritz Hippler wrote in his 1942 book Contemplations on Film-Making: "Enough has been written as to whether 'celebritism' is beneficial or harmful—but one way or the other, it cannot be denied that throughout the world a main motive of people going to the movies is to see the faces they know and love" and Hippler suggested that the stars to be chosen for Nazi cinema should have "European standard" and at the same time appeal to the "Germans' ideal of beauty", so that Germans could identify with them. Non-German actors in the Nazi cinema included Zarah Leander, Marika Rökk, Lída Baarová, Pola Negri, Adina Mandlová, Johannes Heesters, Iván Petrovich, Laura Solari, Angelo Ferrari, Germana Paolieri (Italian), Nikolay Fyodorovich Kolin, Boris Alekin (Russian), Igo Sym (Polish), Rosita Serrano (Chilean). The Russian Victor Tourjansky and the Hungarian Géza von Bolváry were popular non-German directors.

In 1944, Joseph Goebbels issued a list with "irreplaceable artists" called the Gottbegnadeten list, which included people such as Arno Breker, Richard Strauss, and Johannes Heesters.

During World War II, German film stars supported the war effort by performing for the troops or by collecting money for the German Winter Relief Organization (Winterhilfswerk). Although most of the male stars were exempted from military service, some—such as the popular Heinz Rühmann—participated in the war as soldiers, often accompanied by newsreel film crews.

The Bureau for the Promotion of Art worked with sub-divisions of the RMVP to investigate the racial origins of actors. Hans Albers's popularity was able to maintain his acting career despite his relationship with Hansi Burg, a Jewish woman.

Actors and filmmakers such as Fritz Grünbaum, Hans Behrendt, and Max Ehrlich were murdered in The Holocaust. Richard Oswald, Reinhold Schünzel, Wolfgang Zilzer, Henry Koster, Curt Alexander, and others fled Germany after the rise of the Nazis. Liane Haid fled Germany in 1942 stating that "Everything was bombed and because all the good directors had left".

== National film award winners ==
Officially honored films considered by the Nazis to be "artistically valuable" (German: künstlerisch wertvoll) by the state (* = predicate "special political value" – introduced in 1934, + = predicate "special traditional value" (German: volkstümlich wertvoll), ** = predicate "film of the nation" introduced in 1941):

Year	Title
1933	S.A.-Mann Brand (dir. Franz Seitz, Sr.); Hitlerjunge Quex i.e., Hitler Youth Quex (dir. Hans Steinhoff); Reifende Jugend i.e., Maturing Youth (dir. Carl Froelich); Flüchtlinge i.e., Refugees (dir. Gustav Ucicky)
1934	Ich für dich, du für mich i.e., I for you, you for me (dir. Carl Froelich); Der Schimmelreiter i.e., The Rider on the White Horse (dir. Curt Oertel, Hans Deppe), based on the novella by Theodor Storm; Der verlorene Sohn i.e., The Prodigal Son (dir. Luis Trenker); Der Herr der Welt i.e., Master of the World (dir. Harry Piel); *Stoßtrupp 1917 i.e., Shock Troop 1917 (dir. Hans Zöberlein, Ludwig Schmid-Wildy); Krach um Jolanthe i.e., Trouble with Jolanthe (dir. Carl Froelich), based on a book by August Hinrichs
1935	*Hermine und die sieben Aufrechten i.e., Hermine and the Seven Upright Men (dir. Frank Wisbar); Liebesleute – Hermann und Dorothea von Heute i.e., A Pair of Lovers – Hermann and Dorothea of today (dir. Erich Waschneck); Mazurka (dir. Willi Forst); Artisten (dir. Harry Piel); Liebe geht – wohin sie will i. ., Love goes – wherever it wants to (dir. Kurt Skalden); *Der alte und der junge König i.e., The old and the young King (dir. Hans Steinhoff); *Das Mädchen Johanna i.e., Lass Joan (dir. Gustav Ucicky), a film about the French heroine Joan of Arc; Friesennot i.e., Frisians in Hardship (dir. Willi Krause); Henker, Frauen und Soldaten i.e., Hangmen, Women and Soldiers (dir. Johannes Meyer), a film about two cousins, one fighting on the German side in the Freikorps, the other fighting on the bolshevist (proto-soviet) side *Liselotte von der Pfalz i.e., The Private Life of Louis XIV (dir. Carl Froelich), about Elizabeth Charlotte, Princess of the Palatinate; Papageno (dir. Lotte Reiniger); *Der höhere Befehl i.e., The Higher Command (dir. Gerhard Lamprecht)
1936	Das Schönheitsfleckchen i.e., The Beauty Spot (dir. Rolf Hansen); *Traumulus i.e., The Dreamer (dir. Carl Froelich); Drei Mäderl um Schubert i.e., Three Girls around Schubert (dir. E. W. Emo), based on a novel by Rudolf Hans Bartsch; Stadt Anatol i.e., City of Anatol (dir. Victor Tourjansky); Stärker als Paragraphen i.e., Stronger than Paragraphs (dir. Jürgen von Alten); Wenn der Hahn kräht i.e., When the cock crows (dir. Carl Froelich); Schlußakkord i.e., Final Chord (dir. Douglas Sirk); Savoy Hotel 217 (dir. Gustav Ucicky), a crime story in the Russian Empire; Fährmann Maria i.e., Ferryman Maria (dir. Frank Wisbar); Glückskinder i.e., Lucky Kids (dir. Paul Martin); 90 Minuten Aufenthalt i.e., 90-Minute-Stopover (dir. Harry Piel), a real time film about two friends, a German and a British criminal investigator who solve a case in Lisbon; Der Dschungel ruft i.e., The Jungle Calls (dir. Harry Piel); Der Bettelstudent i.e., The Beggar Student (dir. Georg Jacoby), based on the play by Carl Millöcker; Allotria i.e., Tomfoolery (dir. Willi Forst); *Der Kaiser von Kalifornien i.e., The Kaiser of California (dir. Luis Trenker); *Verräter i.e., The Traitor (dir. Karl Ritter); *Wenn wir alle Engel wären i.e., If We All Were Angels (dir. Carl Froelich)
1937	*Der Herrscher i.e., The Sovereign (dir. Veit Harlan); *Patrioten i.e., Patriots (dir. Karl Ritter); Mein Sohn, der Herr Minister i.e., My Son, the Government Minister (dir. Veit Harlan), a comedy making fun of the parliamentary system Der Mann, der Sherlock Holmes war i.e., The Man Who Was Sherlock Holmes (dir. Karl Hartl); Gewitterflug zu Claudia i.e., Stormy flight to Claudia (dir. Erich Waschneck); *Der zerbrochene Krug i.e., The Broken Jug (dir. Gustav Ucicky), based on the play by Heinrich von Kleist; *Condottieri (dir. Luis Trenker, Werner Klingler), about Cesare Borgia and Caterina Sforza; *Die Tochter des Samurai i.e., The Daughter of the Samurai (dir. Arnold Fanck, Mansaku Itami); *Urlaub auf Ehrenwort i.e., Leave on Word of Honor (dir. Karl Ritter)
1938	Revolutionshochzeit i.e., Revolution-Marriage (dir. Hans Heinz Zerlett); *Heimat (dir. Carl Froelich); Der Berg ruft i.e., The Mountain Calls (dir. Luis Trenker), about the first ascent of the Matterhorn; based on a novel by Carl Haensel; Das Verlegenheitskind (dir. Peter Paul Brauer); Jugend i.e. Youth (dir. Veit Harlan), based on a play by Max Halbe; Der Fall Deruga i.e., The Deruga Case (dir. Fritz Peter Buch), based on a novel by Ricarda Huch; Mit versiegelter Order (dir. Karl Anton); Liebelei und Liebe i.e., Flirtation and Love (dir. Arthur Maria Rabenalt); Napoleon ist an allem schuld i.e., Napoleon Is to Blame for Everything (dir. Curt Goetz), about a man who studies Napoleon's biography and therefore neglects his wife Geheimzeichen LB 17 i.e., Secret Code LB 17 (dir. Victor Tourjansky); Verwehte Spuren i.e., Covered Tracks, (dir. Veit Harlan); Verklungene Melodie i.e., Faded Melody, (dir. Victor Tourjansky); Tanz auf dem Vulkan i.e., Dance on the Volcano (dir. Hans Steinhoff), about Jean-Gaspard Deburau; *Der Katzensteg (dir. Fritz Peter Buch); *Kautschuk i.e., Rubber (dir. Eduard von Borsody); Die Umwege des schönen Karl i.e., The Roundabouts of Handsome Karl (dir. Carl Froelich); *Pour le Mérite (dir. Karl Ritter)
1939	Es war eine rauschende Ballnacht i.e., It was an Amazing Night at the Ball (dir. Carl Froelich), a film about the Russian composer Pyotr Ilyich Tchaikovsky; Der Schritt vom Wege i.e., The False Step (dir. Gustaf Gründgens), based on the novel Effi Briest by Theodor Storm; Flucht ins Dunkel i.e., Escape in the Dark (dir. Arthur Maria Rabenalt); *Aufruhr in Damaskus i.e., Uproar in Damascus (dir. Gustav Ucicky); Ein ganzer Kerl i.e., A Real Man (dir. Fritz Peter Buch); Johannisfeuer i.e., Midsummer Night's Fire (dir. Arthur Maria Rabenalt), based on the book by Hermann Sudermann; Der Florentiner Hut i.e., The Leghorn Hat (dir. Wolfgang Liebeneiner), based on the play Un Chapeau de paille d'Italie by Eugène Marin Labiche; Befreite Hände i.e., Liberated Hands (dir. Hans Schweikart); Männer müssen so sein i.e., Men Have To Be That Way (dir. Arthur Maria Rabenalt); Hotel Sacher (dir. Erich Engel); Opernball i.e., Opera Ball (dir. Géza von Bolváry) *+Robert Koch, der Bekämpfer des Todes i.e., Robert Koch, fighting death (dir. Hans Steinhoff); *Mutterliebe i.e., A Mother's Love (dir. Gustav Ucicky)
1940	Der Postmeister i.e., The Postmaster (dir. Gustav Ucicky); *Wunschkonzert i.e., Request Concert (dir. Eduard von Borsody); Wiener G'schichten i.e., Vienna Tales (dir. Géza von Bolváry); Die Geierwally i.e., The Vulture Wally (dir. Hans Steinhoff), based on a novel by Wilhelmine von Hillern; Das Herz der Königin i.e., The Heart of the Queen (dir. Carl Froelich), about Mary, Queen of Scots; *Friedrich Schiller – Der Triumph eines Genies i.e., Friedrich Schiller – The Triumph of a Genius (dir. Herbert Maisch); *Feinde i.e., Enemies (dir. Victor Tourjansky); *Jud Süß (dir. Veit Harlan); *Bismarck (dir. Wolfgang Liebeneiner)
1941	Friedemann Bach (dir. Traugott Müller), a film about Johann Sebastian Bach's son Wilhelm Friedemann Bach; Ich klage an i.e., I accuse (dir. Wolfgang Liebeneiner); *Mein Leben für Irland i.e., My Life for Ireland (dir. Max W. Kimmich); *Kampfgeschwader Lützow (dir. Hans Bertram); *Annelie (dir. Josef von Báky); Auf Wiedersehn, Franziska i.e., Goodbye, Franziska (dir. Helmut Käutner); Quax, der Bruchpilot (dir. Kurt Hoffmann); *Kopf hoch, Johannes! i.e., Cheer up, Johannes! (dir. Viktor de Kowa); Operette i.e., Operetta (dir. Willi Forst), about Franz Jauner and the establishment of the Viennese Operetta; Immer nur Du i.e., You, always (dir. Karl Anton); Die schwedische Nachtigall i.e., The Swedish Nightingale (dir. Peter Paul Brauer), about Jenny Lind and Hans Christian Andersen; *Komödianten i.e., The Comedians (dir. Georg Wilhelm Pabst); **Ohm Krüger (dir. Hans Steinhoff); **Heimkehr i.e., Coming Home (dir. Gustav Ucicky)
1942	Wiener Blut i.e., Vienna Blood (dir. Willi Forst), a romantic comedy film about the Congress of Vienna; *Zwei in einer großen Stadt i.e., Two in a Big City (dir. Volker von Collande); Die goldene Stadt i.e., The Golden City (dir. Veit Harlan); Rembrandt (dir. Hans Steinhoff), about the Dutch painter Rembrandt van Rijn; Der große Schatten i.e., The Great Shadow (dir. Paul Verhoeven); Kleine Residenz i.e., Little residence (dir. Hans Heinz Zerlett); *Hände hoch! i.e., Hands Up! (dir. Alfred Weidenmann); *Diesel (dir. Gerhard Lamprecht), about Rudolf Diesel +Anuschka (dir. Helmut Käutner); Meine Frau Teresa i.e., My Wife Theresa (dir. Arthur Maria Rabenalt); *Andreas Schlüter (dir. Herbert Maisch), about sculptor and architect Andreas Schlüter; *Wen die Götter lieben i.e., Whom the Gods Love (dir. Karl Hartl), about Wolfgang Amadeus Mozart; *Der Strom i.e., The River (dir. Günther Rittau); Die Nacht in Venedig i.e., The Night in Venice (dir. Paul Verhoeven) *+Die große Liebe i.e., The Great Love (dir. Rolf Hansen); **Der große König i.e., The Great King (dir. Veit Harlan); **Die Entlassung i.e., The Dismissal (dir. Wolfgang Liebeneiner); Wir machen Musik i.e., We Make Music (dir. Helmut Käutner), about a composer whose idols are Johann Sebastian Bach and the like, but who himself fails as a composer of Art music and then succeeds making popular music
1943	Sophienlund (dir. Heinz Rühmann); Romanze in Moll i.e., Romance in a Minor Key (dir. Helmut Käutner); Der ewige Klang i.e., The Eternal Sound (dir. Günther Rittau), about two brothers, a violinist and a violin maker, guest star: Georges Boulanger, singing: Elisabeth Schwarzkopf; Frauen sind keine Engel i.e., Women are not Angels (dir. Willi Forst) +Immensee (dir. Veit Harlan), based on the novella by Theodor Storm; *Germanin – Die Geschichte einer kolonialen Tat i.e., Germanin – the history of a colonial deed (dir. Max W. Kimmich, Luis Trenker), about the development of Suramin "to save Africa" from trypanosomiasis Altes Herz wird wieder jung i.e., Old heart rejuvenated (dir. Erich Engel); Armer Hansi i.e., Poor Hansi (dir. Gerhard Fieber), animated film by the Deutsche Zeichentrickfilme G.m.b.H; Zirkus Renz (dir. Arthur Maria Rabenalt), about the Circus Renz; Späte Liebe i.e., Late Love (dir. Gustav Ucicky), about a man who is estranged from his wife but finally they really find together Damals i.e., Back Then (dir. Rolf Hansen); *Wien 1910 i.e., Vienna 1910 (dir. E. W. Emo), about the mayor of Vienna Karl Lueger; *Paracelsus (dir. Georg Wilhelm Pabst), about the Swiss German philosopher Paracelsus; Ein glücklicher Mensch i.e., A joyful person (dir. Paul Verhoeven), about a famous chemistry professor, based on the play "Swedenhielms" by Hjalmar Bergman; Der weiße Traum i.e., The White Dream (dir. Géza von Cziffra); Großstadtmelodie i.e., Melody of a Great City (dir. Wolfgang Liebeneiner); *Der unendliche Weg i.e., The Endless Road (dir. Hans Schweikart)
1944	Der gebieterische Ruf i.e., The Masterful Calling (dir. Gustav Ucicky); Die Feuerzangenbowle i.e., The Punch Bowl (dir. Helmut Weiss); *Philharmoniker i.e., Philharmonic (dir. Paul Verhoeven); Träumerei i.e., Dreaming (dir. Harald Braun), about Robert Schumann; Das Herz muss schweigen (dir. Gustav Ucicky); Familie Buchholz i.e., The Buchholz Family (dir. Carl Froelich), based on a novel by Julius Stinde; Orientexpreß i.e., Orient Express (dir. Victor Tourjansky) +Neigungsehe i.e., Marriage of Affection (dir. Carl Froelich); Opfergang i.e., Way of Sacrifice (dir. Veit Harlan)
1945	**Kolberg (dir. Veit Harlan)

== Financial ==
Financial details of German films
Year	Title	Cost	Revenue	Net revenue	Refs and notes
1933	Hitlerjunge Quex	225,000			
1933	Refugees	814,000			
1934	A Man Wants to Get to Germany	400,000			
1936	The Traitor	465,000			
1938	Urlaub auf Ehrenwort	598,000	2,650,000	1,596,000	
1938	Pour le Mérite	1,076,000	3,700,000	1,937,000	
1939	D III 88	1,268,000	3,500,000	1,666,000	
1939	Linen from Ireland	744,000	1,350,000	178,000	
1939	Robert and Bertram	1,219,000	1,400,000	-120,000	
1940	Bismarck	1,794,000	4,400,000	1,989,000	
1940	The Rothschilds	951,000	2,500,000	1,093,000	
1940	Friedrich Schiller – The Triumph of a Genius	1,935,000	2,600,000	238,000	
1940	Jud Süß	2,081,000	6,500,000	3,172,000	
1940	Wunschkonzert	905,000	7,200,000	4,239,000	
1941	Carl Peters	3,190,000	3,300,000	-453,000	
1941	Homecoming	4,020,000	4,900,000	-423,000	
1941	I Accuse	960,000	5,400,000	3,641,000	
1941	Ohm Krüger	5,477,000	5,500,000	-801,000	
1941	Stukas	1,961,000	3,500,000	956,000	
1942	The Great King	4,779,000	6,000,000	343,000	
1942	The Dismissal	3,600,000	6,500,000	2,081,000	
1942	The Red Terror	1,849,000	3,500,000	1,161,000	
1943	Young Eagles	1,886,000	4,000,000	1,637,000	

== Banned after World War II ==
German feature films banned after World War II
Title	Year of release	Director	Studio	Refs and notes
A Beautiful Day	1943	Philipp Lothar Mayring	Tobis Film	
Above All Else in the World	1941	Karl Ritter	UFA	
Alert Level V	1941	Alois Johannes Lippl	Bavaria Film	
Annelie	1941	Josef von Báky	UFA	
Attack on Baku	1942	Fritz Kirchhoff	UFA	
Attention! The Enemy is Listening!	1940	Arthur Maria Rabenalt	Terra Film	
Baptism of Fire	1940			
Battle Squadron Lützow	1941	Hans Bertram	Tobis Film	
The Beloved	1939	Gerhard Lamprecht	UFA	
Bismarck	1940	Wolfgang Liebeneiner	Tobis Film	
Black Fighter Johanna	1934	Johannes Meyer	Terra Film	
By a Silken Thread	1938	Robert A. Stemmle	UFA	
Cadets	1939	Karl Ritter	UFA	
Carl Peters	1941	Herbert Selpin	Bavaria Film	
Comrades	1941	Hans Schweikart	Bavaria Film	
Counterfeiters	1940	Hermann Pfeiffer	Terra Film	
Covered Tracks	1938	Veit Harlan	Majestic Film	
D III 88	1939	Herbert Maisch	Tobis Film	
The Dark Spot	1940	Georg Zoch	Deka Film	
Das Alte Recht	1934	Igo Martin Andersen	Andersen Film Production	
The Degenhardts	1944	Werner Klingler	Tobis Film	
The Desert Song	1939	Paul Martin	UFA	
Dreizehn Mann und eine Kanone	1938	Johannes Meyer	Bavaria Film	
The Dismissal	1942	Wolfgang Liebeneiner	Tobis Film	
Enemies	1940	Victor Tourjansky	Bavaria Film	
Escape in the Dark	1939	Arthur Maria Rabenalt	Terra Film	
The Eternal Jew	1940	Fritz Hippler	Deutsche Filmherstellungs und Verwertungs	
The Eternal Spring	1939	Fritz Kirchhoff	Bavaria Film	
Ewiger Wald	1939	Hanns Springer; Rolf von Sonjevski-Jamrowski	Lex Film; Albert Graf v. Pestalozza	
The Family Tree of Dr. Pistorius	1939	Karl Georg Külb	UFA	
Feldzug in Polen	1940			
The Fire Devil	1940	Luis Trenker	Luis Trenker Film	
Five Million Look for an Heir	1938	Carl Boese	Majestic Film	
The Flute Concert of Sanssouci	1930	Gustav Ucicky	UFA	
The Fox of Glenarvon	1940	Max W. Kimmich	Tobis Film	
Fräulein Veronika	1936	Veit Harlan	Deutsch-schweizerisch-ungarlische Gemeinschaftsproduction	
Friedrich Schiller – The Triumph of a Genius	1940	Herbert Maisch	Tobis Film	
Frisians in Peril	1935	Peter Hagen	Delta-Film; Hermann Schmidt	
Front in the Sky	1942			
Geheimakte W.B.1	1942	Herbert Selpin		
A German Robinson Crusoe	1940	Arnold Fanck	Bavaria-Filmkunst	
Germanin	1943	Max W. Kimmich	UFA	
The Girl from Barnhelm	1940	Hans Schweikart	Bavaria Film	
The Golden City	1942	Veit Harlan	UFA	
The Golden Spider	1943	Erich Engels	Terra Film	
The Governor	1939	Victor Tourjansky	Terra Film	
The Great and the Little Love	1938	Josef von Báky	Klagemann Film	
The Great King	1942	Veit Harlan	Tobis Film	
The Great Love	1942	Rolf Hansen	UFA	
Hands Up!	1942	Alfred Weidenmann	Deutsche Filmherstellungs und Verwertungs GmbH	
Hans Westmar	1933	Franz Wenzler	Volksdeutsche Filmgesellschaft	
Head up, Johannes!	1941	Viktor de Kowa	Majestic Film; Mülleneisen & Tapper	
The Heart of the Queen	1940	Carl Froelich	UFA	
Homecoming	1941	Gustav Ucicky	Wein Film	
The Hymn of Leuthen	1933	Carl Froelich	Carl Froelich-Film	
I Accuse	1941	Wolfgang Liebeneiner	Tobis Film	
Immensee	1943	Veit Harlan	UFA	
The Immortal Heart	1939	Veit Harlan	Tobis Film	
The Endless Road	1943	Hans Schweikart	Bavaria Film	
Jakko	1941	Fritz Peter Buch	Tobis Film	
Journey into Life	1941	Bernd Hofmann	Bavaria Film	
The Journey to Tilsit	1939	Veit Harlan	Majestic Film	
Jud Süß	1940	Veit Harlan	Terra Film	
Junge Adler	1944	Alfred Weidenmann	UFA	
Jungens	1941	Robert A. Stemmle	UFA	
Kater Lampe	1936	Veit Harlan	Robert Neppach Film	
Kolberg	1945	Veit Harlan	UFA	
Life Calls	1944	Arthur Maria Rabenalt	Terra Film	
Lightning Around Barbara	1941	Werner Klingler	Rolf Randolf-Film	
Linen from Ireland	1939	Heinz Helbig	Wien Film	
Love Is Duty Free	1941	E. W. Emo	Wein Film	
Man for Man	1939	Robert A. Stemmle	UFA	
Militiaman Bruggler	1936	Werner Klingler	Tonlicht Film	
Miracle of Flight	1935	Heinz Paul	Terra Film	
Morgenrot	1933	Gustav Ucicky	UFA	
Musketier Meier III	1938	Joe Stöckel	Germania Film	
My Life for Ireland	1941	Max W. Kimmich	Tobis Film	
The Night With the Emperor	1936	Erich Engel	Klagemann Film	
Baptism of Fire	1940			
Night Without Goodbyes	1943	Erich Waschneck	UFA	
The Old and the Young King	1935	Hans Steinhoff	Deka Film	
Opfergang	1944	Veit Harlan	UFA	
Patriots	1937	Karl Ritter	UFA	
Pedro Will Hang	1941	Veit Harlan	Majestic Film	
People in the Storm	1941	Fritz Peter Buch	Tobis Film	
Petermann Ist Dagegen	1937	Franz Wenzler	Neucophon-Tonfilm Productions	
Pour le Mérite	1938	Karl Ritter	UFA	
The Prodigal Son	1934	Luis Trenker	Deutsche Universal Film	
The Rainer Case	1942	Paul Verhoeven	Tobis Film	
The Rebel	1932	Luis Trenker; Curtis Bernhardt	Deutsche Universal Film	
The Red Terror	1942	Karl Ritter	UFA	
Refugees	1933	Gustav Ucicky	UFA	
Riding for Germany	1941	Arthur Maria Rabenalt	UFA	
Ripening Youth	1933	Carl Froelich	Carl Froehlich Film	
Robert and Bertram	1939	Hans H. Zerlett	Tobis Film	
The Roedern Affair	1944	Erich Waschneck	Berlin Film	
The Rothschilds	1940	Erich Waschneck	UFA	
The Ruler	1937	Veit Harlan	Tobis Film	
Saloon Car E 417	1939	Paul Verhoeven	Deka Film	
S.A.-Mann Brand	1933	Franz Seitz Sr.	Bavaria Film	
Secret Code LB 17	1938	Victor Tourjansky	Terra Film	
Sensational Casilla Trial	1939	Eduard von Borsody	UFA	
Shock Troop	1934	Hans Zöberlein; Ludwig Schmid-Wildy	Arya Film	
Shoulder Arms	1939	Jürgen von Alten	Germania-Film	
Six Days of Home Leave	1941	Jürgen von Alten	Cine-Allianz	
Sky Hounds	1942	Roger von Norman	Terra Film	
Soldier Comrades	1936	Toni Huppertz	Cinephon Film	
Spähtrupp Hallgarten	1941	Herbert B. Fredersdorf	Germania Film	
The Sporck Battalion	1934	Rolf Randolf	Rolf Randolf Film	
The Stage Hare	1937	Joe Stöckel	Astra Film	
Steputat & Co.	1938	Carl Böse	Terra Film	
Stukas	1941	Karl Ritter	UFA	
Target in the Clouds	1938	Wolfgang Liebeneiner	Terra Film	
Titanic	1943	Herbert Selpin; Werner Klingler	Tobis Film	
The Traitor	1936	Karl Ritter	UFA	
Trenck, the Pandur	1934	Herbert Selpin	Tobis Film	
Trouble Backstairs	1935	Veit Harlan	A.B.C. Film	
Twilight	1940	Rudolf van der Noss	UFA	
Two in a Big City	1942	Volker von Collande	Tobis Film	
Two Worlds	1940	Gustaf Gründgens	Terra Film	
U-boats Westward!	1941	Günther Rittau	UFA	
The Uncanny Transformation of Alex Roscher	1943	Paul May	Bavaria Film	
Under Sealed Orders	1938	Karl Anton	Majestic Film	
Venus on Trial	1941	Hans H. Zerlett	Bavaria Film	
The Voice from the Ether	1939	Harald Paulsen	Terra Film	
Vienna 1910	1942	E. W. Emo	Wien Film	
Wedding in Barenhof	1938	Carl Froelich	UFA	
White Slaves	1936	Karl Anton	Lloyd Film	
Wunschkonzert	1940	Eduard von Borsody	Cine-Allianz	
Youth	1938	Veit Harlan	Tobis Film	

== See also ==
- List of German films of 1933–1945
- List of Nazi propaganda films
- Cinema of Germany
- Jews in German cinema
- Reichsfilmarchiv (an archive for films created under Nazi rule)
- Why We Fight, an American answer to Nazi propaganda films during the World War II years

== Works cited ==
- (in German) Albrecht, Gerd (1969). Nationalsozialistische Filmpolitik. Munich: Hanser.
- Leiser, Erwin (1974). Nazi Cinema. Macmillan Publishers. ISBN 0025702300.
- (in German) Spiker, Jürgen (1975). Film und Kapital. Der Weg der deutschen Filmwirtschaft zum nationalsozialistischen Einheitskonzern. Berlin: Volker Spiess. ISBN 3920889045
- Hull, David (1969). Film in the Third Reich: Art and Propaganda in Nazi Germany. Simon & Schuster. SBN 671214861.
- Kelson, John (1996). Catalogue of Forbidden German Feature and Short Film Productions held in Zonal Film Archives of Film Section, Information Services Division, Control Commission for Germany, (BE) (2 ed.). Greenwood Publishing Group. ISBN 0948911190.
- Merziger, Patrick (2014). "Americanised, Europeanised or nationalised? The film industry in Europe under the influence of Hollywood, 1927–1968". In Nathaus, Klaus (ed.). Made in Europe: The Production of Popular Culture in the Twentieth Century. Abingdon: Routledge. ISBN 978-1138794443.
- Niven, Bill (2018). Hitler and Film: The Führer's Hidden Passion. Yale University Press. ISBN 9780300200362.
- Orlow, Dietrich (1969). The History of the Nazi Party: 1919–1933. University of Pittsburgh Press. SBN 822931834.
- Waldman, Harry (2008). Nazi Films In America, 1933–1942. McFarland & Company. ISBN 9780786438617.
- Welch, David (1983). Propaganda and the German Cinema: 1933–1945. I.B. Tauris. ISBN 9781860645204.
