= Die Deutsche Wochenschau =

1940–1945 German newsreel series

Title card

Die Deutsche Wochenschau (German for 'The German Weekly Review', lit. 'The German Weekly Look' or 'The German Weekly Show') is the title of the unified newsreel series released in the cinemas of Nazi Germany from June 1940 until the end of World War II, with the final edition issued on 22 March 1945. The co-ordinated newsreel production was set up as a vital instrument for the mass distribution of Nazi propaganda at war. Today the preserved Wochenschau short films make up a significant part of the audiovisual records of the Nazi era.

== History ==
Newsreels had been regularly released since the early days of German cinema, especially during World War I, when companies like Messter Film started producing short silent film documentaries. With the final changeover to sound films in the early 1930s, the newsreel market concentrated on four dominating production companies: Universum Film AG (Ufa-Tonwoche and Deulig-Tonwoche, 20th Century Fox (Fox Tönende Wochenschau), Bavaria Film (Emelka-Tonwoche), and Tobis (Tobis-Wochenschau). After the Nazi seizure of power in 1933, the production was supervised and censored by the Ministry of Public Enlightenment and Propaganda under Joseph Goebbels, who had realized the enormous significance of newsreels for his propaganda purposes.

Upon the German invasion of Poland in September 1939, marking the outbreak of the Second World War, the Nazi authorities consolidated the four separate newsreel production efforts into one, led by the Universum Film AG in Berlin. These newsreels were merged into a single wartime newsreel, but kept their respective opening titles until June 1940. After that, the merger was made public by use of a single new opening title: Die Deutsche Wochenschau. This was the sole series of German newsreels until production was discontinued in March 1945, when most cinemas in Germany were closed and transport links had collapsed.

After the last editions of the "Deutsche Wochenschau" were shown only irregularly in the few remaining cinemas from the end of December 1944, production ended on March 22, 1945, with the theatrical version of No. 755. This final edition featured, among other things, Adolf Hitler's last public appearance in the garden of the New Reich Chancellery, just one month before his 56th birthday, where he awarded the Iron Cross to twenty Hitler Youth members. For a long time, it was assumed that these recordings were taken on Hitler's birthday, April 20, 1945. It later emerged that they had already been taken the previous month.

== Production ==
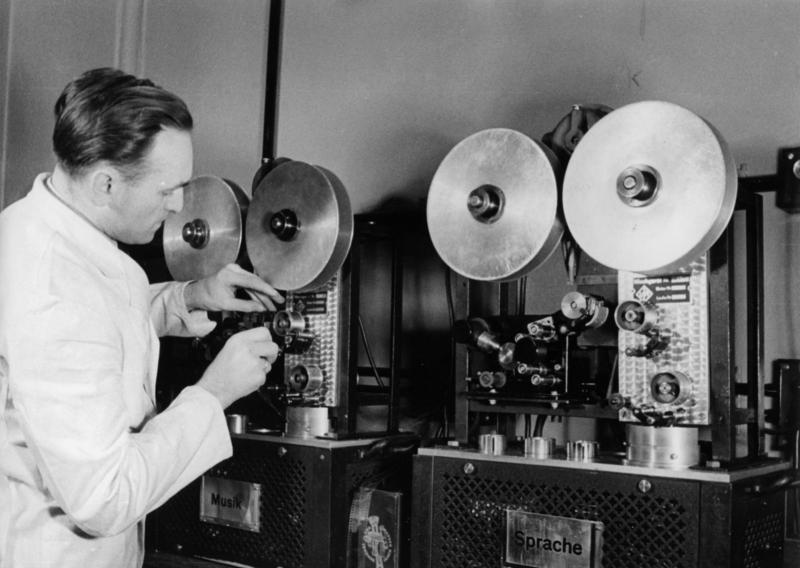
Mixing room, 1941

Die Deutsche Wochenschau received film stock from special Wehrmacht war reporting units (Propagandakompanien) and notable cinematographers like Hans Ertl and Walter Frentz. The material was a source of footage for late Nazi propaganda films such as The Eternal Jew and The Campaign in Poland, as well as innumerable post-war documentaries. The former Tobis-Wochenschau speaker and voice-over artist Harry Giese was assigned as "the voice" of the combined German newsreel production. Despite his signature rat-a-tat narration that gives the proceedings a documentary-like tone, liberties were taken in retelling the facts in this Nazi propaganda tool. Comedic public service announcements were delivered by the Tran and Helle duo. The Austrian composer Franz R. Friedl was musical director of Die Deutsche Wochenschau.

Newsreels typically preceded the main feature film, introduced by an opening sequence derived from the Horst-Wessel-Lied; after the beginning of the Russian Campaign in 1941 it was accompanied by the fanfare motif from Liszt's Les Préludes. After the 1943 Battle of Stalingrad, Goebbels ordered an increase of efforts to manipulate the war reporting in order to keep up the perseverance of the German people. However, these plans foundered on countless eyewitness reports by Wehrmacht soldiers via military mail or while home on leave, the widespread listening to foreign radio stations, and also the effects of Allied strategic bombing on German cities.

Die Deutsche Wochenschau was also exported to occupied territories that had been annexed to the Reich, like Austria and the Grand Duchy of Luxemburg. For other occupied regions, or for neutral nations (like Sweden), another newsreel was made: Ufa's Auslandstonwoche (German for 'Foreign Weekly Newsreel').

Among the many notable scenes preserved by the newsreel are the Nazi point of view during the Battle of Normandy, the footage of Hitler and Mussolini right after the 20 July plot, and the last footage (No. 755) of Hitler awarding the Iron Cross to Hitler Youth volunteers in the garden of the Reich Chancellery shortly before the Battle of Berlin. Its last documentary, Traitors before the People's Court, depicted the trial of the accused in the 20 July plot, and was never shown.

== See also ==
- Nazism and cinema
- List of German films of 1933–45
- Panorama, color newsreel released during the last months of the Third Reich.
- Wehrmachtbericht, another regular means of military propaganda from Nazi Germany.
- Degeto Weltspiegel
