= Harry Giese =

German actor (1903–1991)

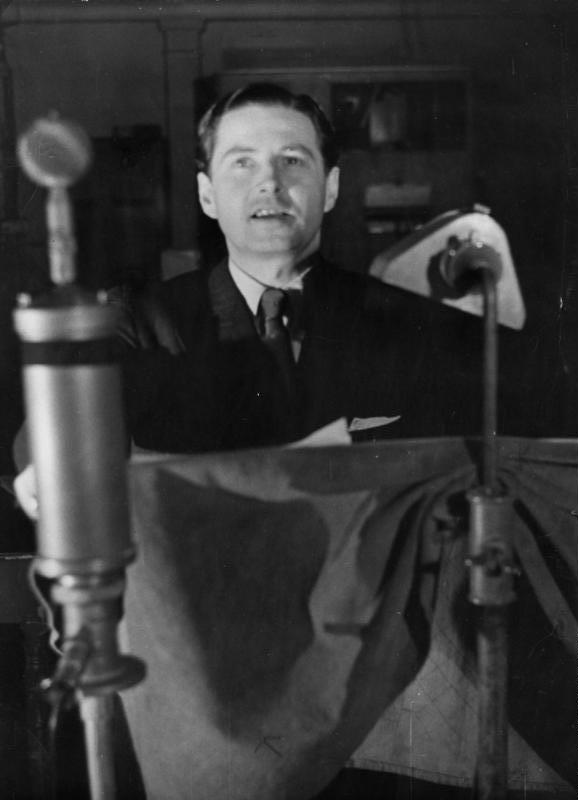
- Giese in 1941
- Born: 2 March 1903; Magdeburg, Germany
- Died: 20 January 1991 (aged 87); Berlin, Germany
- Occupation: Actor

Harry Giese (2 March 1903 – 20 January 1991) was a German theatre and voice actor. He is best known for providing voiceovers on German newsreels during the Second World War, especially Die Deutsche Wochenschau (The German Weekly), which was shown weekly in cinemas.

== Early life ==
Harry Giese was born on 2 March 1903 in Magdeburg, Province of Saxony.

== Career ==
Giese provided voiceovers on German newsreels during the Second World War, including the film magazine Die Deutsche Wochenschau (The German Weekly Review), which was shown weekly in cinemas, for which his voice became very well known. The newsreel presented the latest news from war time fronts using film from cameramen working with the Wehrmacht. Die Deutsche Wochenschau was formed when the Ministry of Propaganda united all film magazines into this single show in July 1940. For the first few years, each episode was around 40 minutes, often telling how German soldiers marched victoriously through various places. By 1945, it had reduced to only 10-15 minutes of propaganda.

Giese provided the voice-overs first for Ufa Tonwoche and then its successor Die Deutsche Wochenschau from October 1939 to the end of the Second World War. During the war Giese was known as the "Großdeutscher Sprecher", meaning "Greater German Speaker".

Giese was the narrator of the anti-Semitic propaganda film The Eternal Jew, released on 29 November 1940 throughout the German Reich. The documentary was directed by Fritz Hippler, the director of the Film Department, which was under the direct supervision of the Ministry of Propaganda under Joseph Goebbels.

Die Deutsche Wochenschau was discontinued with issue 755 of 22 March 1945, around six weeks before Germany surrendered to the Allies.

Giese was not banned from working after the war during the denazification process, as he was not an official member of the Nazi Party.

At the end of 1947, he returned to work as a voice actor in West Berlin. However, his career was limited owing to his association with Nazi propaganda. In the late 1950s, he was sometimes called upon to voice his own character in television and feature films.

== Death ==
Giese died on 20 January 1991 in Berlin.
