= Degeto Weltspiegel =

Nazi propaganda/news films

Degeto Weltspiegel were short Nazi propaganda/news films that played in German cinemas from 1939 to 1943. There were a total of 50 reels. They were produced by Tobis Film on 35 mm film by special units within the German Army. The following list is not complete. Below are other specials within a certain theme.

1. Spanien und der 50. Geburtstag des Führers
2. Der Stählerne Pakt wird unterzeichnet
3. Danzig, Italien und Japan
4. Der Westwall
5. Danzig ist wieder deutsch
6. Führerhauptquartier
7. Warschau kapituliert
8. Deutsche Schiffe kontrollieren die See
9. Dänemark und Norwegen unter Deutschem Schutz
10. Vormarsch in Norwegen
11. Im Morgengrauen des 10. Mai 1940
12. Vorwärts durch Belgien
13. Aus der deutschen Seekriegsführung
14. Marz durch Belgien
15. Die Schlacht um Dunkirchen
16. Rheinübergang und Eroberung der Marginot Linie
17. Die Schlacht von Frankreich
18. Der Einzug in Paris
19. Zweimal Waffenstillstand
20. Entscheidung auf dem Balkan I. Englands Balkanplane
21. Entscheidung auf dem Balkan II. Jugoslawiens Ende
22. Entscheidung auf dem Balkan III. Der Sprung nach Kreta
23. Europas Kampf gegen den Bolschewismus I, (Kein titel)
24. Europas Kampf gegen den Bolschewismus II, Ein Erdteil marschiert
25. Europas Kampf gegen den Bolschewismus III, Kampf um Finnland
26. Europas Kampf gegen den Bolschewismus IV, Sowjetrussland; Stalin-Linie
27. Europas Kampf gegen den Bolschewismus V, Aus dem Führerhauptquartier, 19. Sept. 1941
28. General Rommel und die Panzerarmee Afrika
29. Deutsche Schlachtschiffe brechen durch den Kanal
30. Winterkrieg 1941/1942 im Osten
31. Eroberung von Kertsch
32. Die Schlacht bei Charkow
33. Tobruk Fallt – 21. Juni 1942
34. Kampf um Sewasatopol
35. Einnahme Sewastopol, die stärkste Festung der Welt
36. Vernichtung des Britisch-Amerikanischen Geleitzuges
37. Kämpfe zwischen Donez und Don
38. Sturm auf Rostow
39. Luftangriffe auf Malta und Kämpfe an der El Alamein Front
40. Sturm auf Armawyr und Woroschilowsky
41. Dieppe 19. Aug. 1942
42. Kaukasusfront (Elbrusbesteigung)
43. Kampf um Stalingrad
44. Von Murmansk bis Afrika
45. Luftangriffe im Osten
46. Heldengedenktag März 1943

== See also ==
- Die Deutsche Wochenschau
- Nazism and cinema
