= Baptism of Fire (1940 film) =

1940 film

- Directed by: Hans Bertram
- Written by: Hans Bertram
- Narrated by: Herbert Gernot; Gerhard Jeschke
- Music by: Norbert Schultze
- Production company: Tobis Film
- Release date: 1940
- Running time: 90 minutes
- Country: Germany
- Language: German

Baptism of Fire (German: Feuertaufe) is a 1940 German documentary film.

== Plot ==
The film covers the German invasion of Poland, particularly the activities of the Luftwaffe.

== Production ==
Hans Bertram wrote and directed the film and his aviation experience aided him in making a documentary about the Luftwaffe's role in the invasion of Poland. Over 230,000 feet of newsreels went into the making of the film. Herbert Gernot and Gerhard Jeschke narrated and Norbert Schultze composed the music. It was one of three films covering the early German Blitzkrieg campaign alongside Feldzug in Polen and Sieg im Westen.

== Release ==
The film was approved by the censors on 3 April 1940.

== Works cited ==
- Welch, David (1983). Propaganda and the German Cinema: 1933-1945. I.B. Tauris. ISBN 9781860645204.
