= Die Frontschau =

1941 film

Die Frontschau (English:The Front Show) is a series of German World War II era military training films, shown to German soldiers shortly before deployment to the Eastern Front. These films were directed by the veteran propagandist Fritz Hippler, best known for Der Ewige Jude.

The installments in the series are:

- FS 11 Terrain Difficulties in the East, Winter and Spring (1943)
- FS 9/10 Construction of Positions (1941)
- FS 8 Defensive Battle in Winter (1943)
- FS 7 Attack by Infantry and Armor Against a Village (1941)
- FS 5/6 Mountains Troops Battle for a Town (1941)
- FS 4 Infantry on the Attack (1941)
- FS 3 Advance (1941)
- FS 2 Russian Construction of Positions (1941)
- FS 13 Traveling Across Ice Surfaces and Waters with Drifting Ice (1941)

== See also ==
- List of German films of 1933–1945

Preceded by The Eternal Jew (1940)	Hippler Propaganda films Die Frontschau (1940)	Succeeded by Sieg im Westen (1941)
