= Vom Bäumlein, das andere Blätter hat gewollt =

1940 Nazi propaganda film

- Production company: Zeichenfilm GmbH
- Release date: February 1, 1940
- Country: Germany
- Language: German

Vom Bäumlein, das andere Blätter hat gewollt ("Of the little tree which wished for different leaves") is a short antisemitic propaganda cartoon produced in 1940 in the Fascist German movie studio Zeichenfilm GmbH.

== Plot ==
The film depicts a golden tree inhabited by little birds, whose leaves (all but one) are stolen by a caricature of a Jewish man: Aber wie es Abend ward, ging der Jude durch den Wald, er steckt sie ein, geht eilends fort und lässt das leere Bäumlein dort...

== Production ==
The cartoon is based on a poem by Friedrich Rückert of the same name. It was produced by Hubert Schonger and directed by Heinz Tischmeyer.

== The poem ==
Rückert's poem begins,
Es ist ein Bäumlein gestanden im Wald
In gutem und schlechtem Wetter

A little tree stood in the forest
In good and bad weather

== See also ==
- List of German films 1933–1945
