= Kampf um Norwegen – Feldzug 1940 =

Kampf um Norwegen - Feldzug 1940
- Directed by: Martin Rikli; Werner Buhre
- Music by: Franz R. Friedl
- Release date: 1940
- Running time: 81 minutes
- Country: Germany
- Language: German

Kampf um Norwegen – Feldzug 1940 (Battle for Norway - 1940 Campaign) is a 1940 Nazi propaganda film directed by Martin Rikli and Dr. Werner Buhre under orders of the Oberkommando der Wehrmacht. The documentary film follows the Invasion of Denmark and Norway in the spring of 1940.

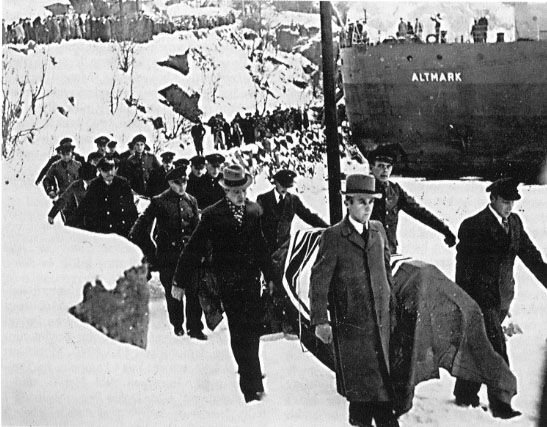
German dead being brought ashore from the German naval tanker Altmark.

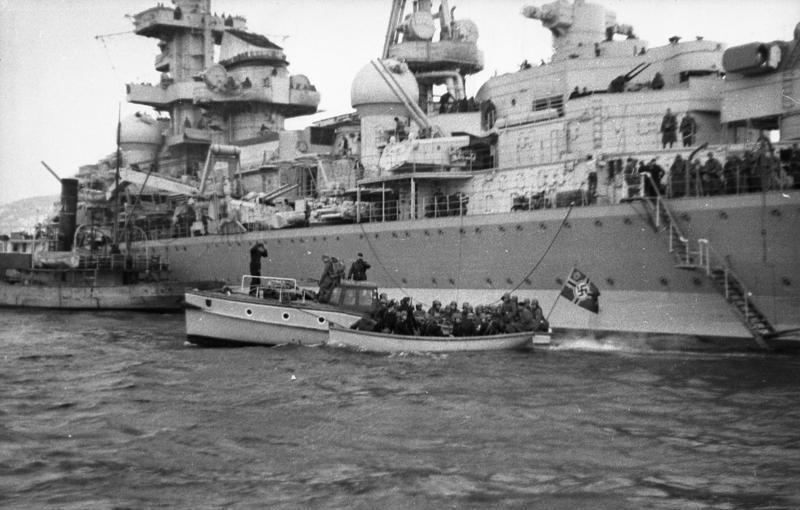
The heavy cruiser Admiral Hipper landing troops in Norway in 1940.

== Summary ==
The film describes the sequence of events leading up to the invasion of Norway, especially the Anschluss of Austria, the division of Czechoslovakia after the Munich Agreement and finally the invasion of Poland in September, 1939. As a prelude, it justifies the invasion of Norway by outlining alleged British plans to invade the country, and attempts by the British to mine the leads along the Atlantic coast. When the Royal Navy invaded Norwegian waters to attack the German tanker Altmark and free prisoners held there by the Germans, it signalled an escalation of the growing crisis. The British prisoners had been captured by the German cruiser Admiral Graf Spee during raids on merchant shipping in the Atlantic Ocean and Indian Ocean in the previous year. The campaign itself opens with the attempt by the German Navy to force entry up the Oslo Fjord, and initially failed owing to Norwegian heavy guns either side of the fjord where it narrowed in the approach to Oslo itself.

== Preservation status ==
The film was never even shown in Germany for unknown reasons, and was considered a lost film for many years. The Berlin Bundesarchiv held only a few clips of the film. However, a complete nitrate copy of the film surfaced on an Internet auction in 2005. The Norwegian college professor and media expert Jostein Saakvitne discovered this, and purchased the copy.

Saakvitne then contacted the Norwegian Film Institute, and a consignment was entered into. The Film Institute had the film transferred to a video master, and sent the nitrate copy to the National Library nitrate film depository in Mo i Rana. As it became clear that the rights belonged to the Bundesarchiv, the film copy was brought back to Germany.

The movie can today be bought on DVD in Germany and Norway, and is, in any case, available as a free download from the Internet Archive.

== See also ==
- List of films made in the Third Reich
- List of rediscovered films
