= Department of Film (Nazi Germany) =

The Department of Film was one of five departments that comprised the Central Party Propaganda Office of the German Nazi Party (NSDAP), established by Adolf Hitler in 1933 as part of the Party's Reichspropagandaleitung. The Central Party Propaganda Office was separate from the official government Ministry of Public Enlightenment and Propaganda, although both groups were run by Joseph Goebbels. Goebbels was named Reichspropagandaleiter and given total control of Germany's press and film "for the spreading of the National Socialist world view to the entire German people" . The Department's main duty was organizing film shows "suitable for public enlightenment and education". The head of the Department of Film (called Reichsamtsleiter) was Karl Neumann.

Film was one of the most important forms of propaganda in Nazi Germany because it was easily attained by all people. Hitler himself declared it superior to the written word, which required "arduous reading" to understand. The importance of film propaganda is underscored by the fact that 45 million people attended the film shows put on by the NSDAP. Reichsamtsleiter Neumann declared that the goal of the Department of Film was not directly political in nature, but was rather to influence the culture, education, and entertainment of the general population.

The strong emphasis the Nazi Party placed on film was also influenced by the personal feelings of Hitler and Goebbels, both of whom were fascinated by the medium. Both men regularly showed films in their homes and often discussed movies and moviemaking.

The Department of Film consisted of seven distinct offices, each of which oversaw a specific area related to Germany's film propaganda:

- Organization
- Bookkeeping
- Production and Equipment
- Dramaturgy
- Cultural Films
- Press Office
- Slides

The Office of Slides was actually a separate body, known as the Gaubildstelle, which was under the supervision of the Department of Film. The Gaubildstelle archived all slides and images of important events, which were then organized and screened by the Department of Film. The Department selected and screened films that focused on "the virtues of the Aryan type, German military and industrial strength, and the evils of the Nazi's enemies". Often these propaganda films focused on Germany’s enemies, particularly to foster anti-British sentiment among the public. The Film Office provided local groups with films, while the leader of the local group was responsible for all preparations.

The Department produced few films before 1939, when Neumann pushed for a greater output. The precise number of films produced during the Nazi era has been lost, but scholars estimate that between 1150 and 1350 feature films were made. One example of film created and endorsed by the Department for Film was the 1940 antisemitic film The Eternal Jew.

== See also ==
- Nazism and cinema
- List of German films of 1933–45
- Reichsfilmkammer
- Nazi propaganda
