= Reich Chamber of Film =

Film regulating company in Nazi Germany

- Reichsfilmkammer

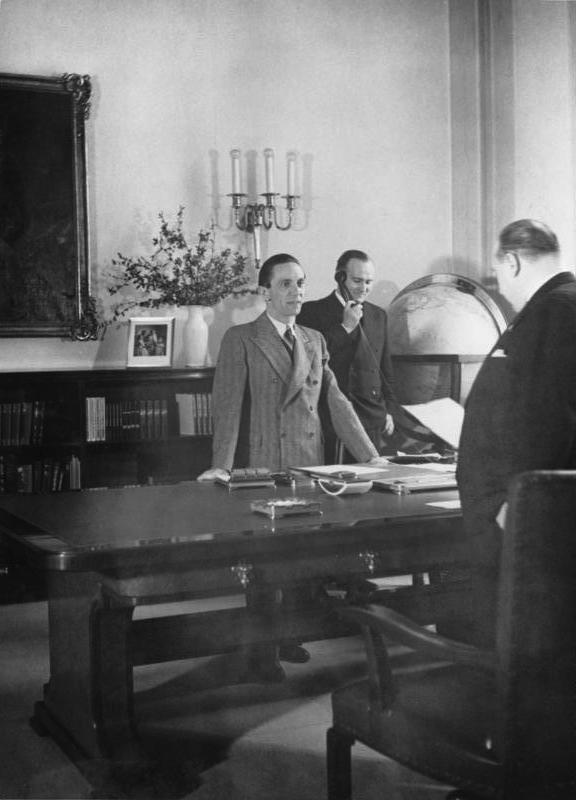
- Reich Minister Joseph Goebbels has a meeting with State Secretary Walther Funk in his office. In the background, Goebbels' assistant Karl Hanke takes a call.

Statutory corporation overview
- Formed: 1933
- Preceding Statutory corporation: Spitzenorganisation der Filmwirtschaft
- Dissolved: 1945
- Jurisdiction: Nazi Germany
- Headquarters: Wilhelmplatz, Berlin
- Minister responsible: Joseph Goebbels, Reich Minister of Propaganda

The Reich Chamber of Film (Reichsfilmkammer, abbreviated as RFK) was a government agency which operated as a statutory corporation controlled by the Ministry of Public Enlightenment and Propaganda that regulated the film industry in Nazi Germany between 1933 and 1945. Membership in the Reichsfachschaft Film department was obligatory for everyone in the German Reich who wanted to work on films in any capacity; lack of membership meant in effect a ban on employment. Based in Berlin, the establishment of the RFK was an important element of the Gleichschaltung process and Nazi film policy.

== History ==
The predecessor of the RFK was the Spitzenorganisation der Filmwirtschaft (SPIO; English: "Film Industry Summit Organisation") founded by Erich Pommer in 1923. Established as an interest group of film producers, the association was dissolved after the Nazi seizure of power and re-established in West Germany in 1950.

The Reichsfilmkammer was established on the basis of the Gesetz über die Errichtung einer vorläufigen Filmkammer ("Law for the Establishment of a Temporary Film Chamber") of 14 July 1933. Under the Reichskulturkammergesetz ("Law of the Reich Culture Chamber") of 22 September 1933 the Film Chamber was integrated as a subdivision of the newly founded Reich Chamber of Culture (Reichskulturkammer) corporation. The establishment of the RFK was preceded by an ordinance of the Reich Ministry of Public Enlightenment and Propaganda, which prohibited Jews and foreigners from any participation in the German film industry.

The RFK edited the journal Film-Kurier, a leading film magazine founded in 1919 and "aryanized" in 1933. In addition, the most popular Illustrierter Film-Kurier programmes were sold in the German cinemas million fold.

The Reichsfilmkammer was officially dissolved by Law no. 2 passed by the Allied Control Council on 10 October 1945; the "Law for the Establishment of a Temporary Film Chamber" was repealed by Allied Control Council Law no. 60 on 19 December 1947.

== Functions ==
The Reichsfilmkammer had a key role in the film-related politics of Nazi propaganda. Its mission was principally:

- the establishment of compulsory control over all those active in any aspect of film production (production, distribution, cinema) organised in the Reichsfachschaft Film (RFF);
- the regulation of the cinema industry (e.g., admission prices, composition of programs, advertising and so on)
- the regulation of contracts, for example between filmmakers and film producers, or between theatre owners and tenants
- supervision of the Film Credit Bank (Filmkreditbank GmbH, FKB) for the financing of projects
- regulation of film exports

== Direction ==
The presidents of the Reichsfilmkammer reporting directly to the Reich Chamber of Culture, chaired by Minister Joseph Goebbels, were as follows:

- Fritz Scheuermann, lawyer, (1933–1935)
- Oswald Lehnich, also economics minister in Württemberg (1935–1939)
- Carl Froelich, film director (1939–1945)

Members of the Presidential Council (Präsidialrat) were, among others: Karl Ritter, Karl Hartl, Carl Auen, and Theodor Loos. The RFK had branches in Breslau, Düsseldorf, Frankfurt, Hamburg, Königsberg, Leipzig, Munich, and Vienna.

== Departments ==
The Reichsfilmkammer comprised 10 departments:

1. General Administration
2. Politics and Culture
3. Artistic Care of Filmmaking
4. Film Industry
5. Reichsfachschaft Film
6. Film Production
7. Domestic Film Distribution
8. Movie Theaters
9. Film and Cinema Technology
10. Cultural and Commercial Film

== See also ==
- Department of Film (Nazi Germany)
- Nazism and cinema
- List of films made in the Third Reich
