= Der Westwall =

1939 film by Fritz Hippler

Der Westwall (English: The West Wall) is a 1939 film about the Siegfried Line directed by Fritz Hippler, the head of the film division within the Propagandaministerium. The Siegfried Line, called the West Wall by the Germans, was a large series of fortifications around the German borders with France, Belgium, Luxembourg, and the Netherlands.

== See also ==
- List of German films 1933-1945

Preceded by Wort und Tat	Hippler Propaganda films Der Westwall (1939)	Succeeded by Feldzug in Polen (1939)
