= The Mad Dog of Europe =

- The Mad Dog of Europe
- Screenplay by: Herman Mankiewicz
- Produced by: Al Rosen

The Mad Dog of Europe is an unproduced anti-Nazi film. The film's screenplay was about the destruction of a German-Jewish family during Hitler’s rise to power.

In 1933, Herman Mankiewicz went on leave from MGM to write a film warning Americans about the rise of Adolf Hitler in Germany. No studio was willing to produce his screenplay, The Mad Dog of Europe, after the MPAA in 1933 discouraged any studios from producing it citing the possibility of all American films being banned from Germany in retaliation.

Al Rosen, an agent hoping to become a producer, tried many times in the mid-1930s to raise money for the project. Joseph Breen, the industry's self-appointed head censor, in his critique of the script hinted at the power of domestic anti-semitism at the time:

Because of the large number of Jews active in the motion picture industry in this country, the charge is certain to be made that the Jews, as a class, are behind an anti-Hitler picture and using the entertainment screen for their own personal propaganda purposes. Because of this, the entire industry is likely to be indicted for the action of a mere handful.

In 1935, MGM was notified by Joseph Goebbels, the Minister of Education and Propaganda under Hitler, that films written by Mankiewicz could not be shown in Nazi Germany unless his name was removed from the screen credits. During World War II, Mankiewicz officially sponsored and took financial responsibility for many refugees fleeing Nazi Germany for the United States.

A 2026 full-length documentary, directed by Rubika Shah and also called The Mad Dog of Europe, explores the vicissitudes of the screenplay and the prohibitions it arouse.

== See also ==
- Nazism and cinema: Censorship abroad
