= Wort und Tat =

- Directed by: Fritz Hippler
- Release date: 1938
- Running time: 10 minutes
- Country: Germany
- Language: German

Wort und Tat (Words and Deeds) is a 10-minute-long Nazi propaganda film directed by Fritz Hippler, which was released in 1938. The United States Holocaust Memorial Museum described the film as a "Propaganda film about the improved life of the German people under Hitler." The film is known for the extensive use of montage to get its message across, in a style reminiscent of Sergei Eisensteins Oktober. It was ordered by Joseph Goebbels.

The film begins with a montage of clips from the Weimar period, showing a series of clips of Labor and Communist rallies, interspersed with scenes of scantily clad cabaret girls, and then shots of posters of various Weimar era political parties. This illustrates the "chaos" and "decadence" of the Weimar period. This sequence ends with former chancellor Heinrich Brüning making a speech against National Socialism.

== See also ==
- List of German films 1933-1945

Preceded by none	Hippler Propaganda films Wort und Tat (1938)	Succeeded by Der Westwall (1939)
