= Sieg im Westen =

- Theatrical release poster
- Directed by: Svend Noldan
- Produced by: Fritz Hippler
- Starring: Erwin Rommel; Adolf Hitler
- Music by: Herbert Windt
- Distributed by: UFA
- Release date: 1941
- Running time: 114 minutes
- Country: Nazi Germany
- Language: German

Sieg im Westen (Victory in the West) is a 1941 Nazi propaganda film.

It was produced by the Oberkommando des Heeres, the German Army High Command, rather than the Propaganda Ministry of Joseph Goebbels. Goebbels indeed sabotaged its release in minor ways, delaying its premiere and telling propagandists not to promote it. Erwin Rommel has been described as "enthusiastically" helping to direct it. French prisoners of war were used during its making.

The prologue consists of the Nazi version of European history and the origins of World War II, and the rest deals with the Battle of France, a Blitzkrieg in the Low Countries and France (10 May – 22 June 1940). The movie was made largely from newsreel footage recut into a documentary. The programme provided states that it is to show the audacity of the German offensive and the superiority of German arms, required because they will not be permitted to live in peace. It did not give Hitler or the Nazi party a central role, thus ensuring its disfavor with Goebbels.

The Nazi journal "Der deutsche Film" called Sieg im Westen "the greatest of all German newsreels." Unlike many other German propaganda films, Sieg im Westen does not belittle the enemy, instead admitting that the French soldiers fought gallantly.

The war is presented "from above"; the battles are depicted as smooth forward advances on the map, with results from reports at the front. The "encirclement" of Germany is depicted by showing prisoners of war from far-off countries.

During the shooting of the movie Black French soldiers who were prisoners of war were forced to take part in its making; at the end of the movie Germans forced them to carry out "exotic dance", most likely to underline their exotic "otherness" and as an act of humiliation.

On 14 August 1940, more than a dozen German Generals who had (three weeks prior) been appointed Field Marshal after the successful Westfeldzug were in Berlin to be presented with their ceremonial batons. While in Berlin, they were shown 'Sieg im Westen'.

== See also ==
- List of German films 1933–1945
- Die Deutsche Wochenschau (English: The German Weekly Review)
