= Panorama (German news series) =

1944 German newsreel

Panorama (Panorama-Farbmonatsschau or Panorama-Monatsschau) was a German monthly colour newsreel series that focused on "human interest" stories produced in 1944 by the Reich Ministry for Public Enlightenment and Propaganda and intended for publication not only within Germany, but also, neutral and occupied countries. Footage was taken by Walter Frentz, who was the first cameraman for the German propaganda companies to shoot colour film in April 1941. Other cameramen were Hans Bastanier, Gerhard Garms, Horst Grund, and Hans Ertl.

It released only four issues, since the Third Reich fell in early 1945, before any other installments could be produced. Nevertheless, it remains a unique source of colour footage of the late stages of the war from the German perspective, albeit a very selective and embellished point of view.

A DVD version was released.

== See also ==
- List of German films 1933–1945
