= Feldzug in Polen =

1940 Nazi propaganda film directed by Fritz Hippler

Feldzug in Polen (The Campaign in Poland) is a 69-minute Nazi propaganda film released in 1940 depicting the 1939 invasion of Poland and directed by Fritz Hippler. Portraying the Poles as aggressors and ethnic Germans living in Poland as an oppressed minority, the film alleges that the Poles employed unheroic tactics in the war and characterizes as senseless the defence of a besieged Warsaw. The film was often screened by German minorities overseas to clarify the German point of view.

French involvement was de-emphasized, in order to present Great Britain, in its attempt to encircle Germany, as the villain, to justify the Nazi-Soviet pact. Polish provocations finally resulted in the blitzkrieg, led by Hitler; Poles were sometimes depicted as brave, to emphasize the German triumph.

== Production ==
The film was directed by Fritz Hippler and the music was composed by Herbert Windt. Footage shot by Gustav Lantschner and Sepp Allgeier, who were working for Leni Riefenstahl's Special Film Troop, was used in the film. In addition, Hippler made use of footage from the newsreels Ufa Ton-Woche 471/38/1939 and Ufa Ton-Woche 472/1939.

It was first shown to a select audience on 8 October 1939, but the military's leadership was concerned that it did not completely reflect the army's role in the invasion. A second version of the film was made and Joseph Goebbels made changes to the script. Adolf Hitler watched this version on 11 December, and asked for more edits. One of Hitler's demands, as reported by Alwin-Broder Albrecht, was to have the Protectorate of Bohemia and Moravia coloured the same as the rest of Germany rather than having its own colour. The first version of the film only covered up to 20 September, and the second version covered up to 5 October.

== Release ==
Its premiere was held in the Berlin Ufa-Palast um Zoo, usually used by Goebbels to present important films. It received massive media support and was officially described as "valuable from a political viewpoint," "artistically valuable," "educational for the nation," and "a film of instruction. It was theatrically released in February 1940.

== See also ==
- List of German films 1933-1945
- List of films set in Warsaw

== Works cited ==
- Niven, Bill (2018). Hitler and Film: The Führer's Hidden Passion. Yale University Press. ISBN 9780300200362.
- Waldman, Harry (2008). Nazi Films In America, 1933-1942. McFarland & Company. ISBN 9780786438617.

Preceded by Der Westwall (1939)	Hippler Propaganda films Feldzug in Polen (1940)	Succeeded by The Eternal Jew (1940)
