= The Eternal Jew (film) =

1940 German antisemitic propaganda film

- Theatrical release poster by Hans Schweitzer
- German: Der ewige Jude
- Directed by: Fritz Hippler
- Written by: Eberhard Taubert
- Narrated by: Harry Giese
- Cinematography: Albert Endrejat; Anton Hafner; Robert Hartmann; Friedrich Carl Heere; Heinz Kluth; Erich Stoll; Heinz Winterfeld; Svend Noldan (uncredited)
- Edited by: Hans Dieter Schiller; Albert Baumeister
- Music by: Franz R. Friedl
- Production company: Deutsche Filmherstellungs- und Verwertungs GmbH (DFG)
- Distributed by: Reich Propaganda Directorate
- Release date: 28 November 1940
- Running time: 65 minutes
- Country: Nazi Germany
- Language: German

The Eternal Jew is a 1940 German antisemitic Nazi propaganda film, presented as a documentary. The initial German title was Der ewige Jude, the German term for the character of the "Wandering Jew" in medieval folklore. Directed by Fritz Hippler at the insistence of the Minister of Propaganda, Joseph Goebbels, the screenplay is credited to Eberhard Taubert and narrated by Harry Giese; it consists of feature and documentary footage combined with materials filmed shortly after the Nazi occupation of Poland. At this time, Poland's Jewish population was about three million, roughly ten percent of the total population.

== Background ==
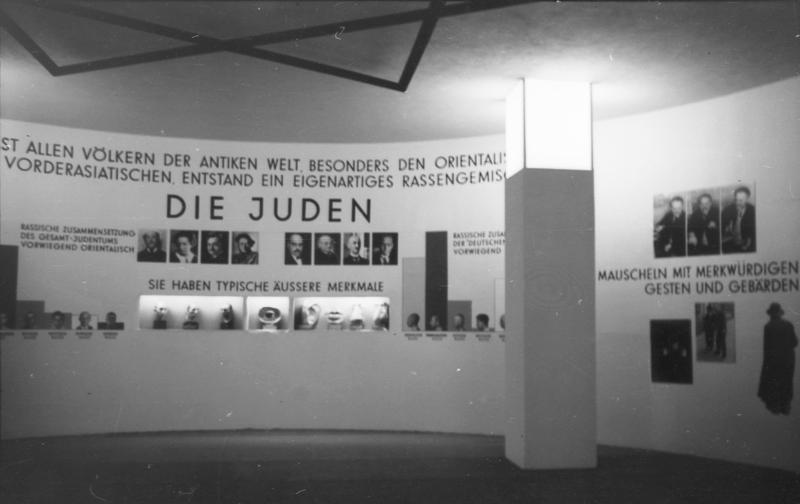
The interior of the exhibition The Eternal Jew (1937/1938)

Hitler and Goebbels believed that film was a vital tool for molding public opinion. The Nazis first established a film department in 1930 and Goebbels had taken a personal interest in the use of film to promote the Nazi philosophy and agenda. Soon after the Nazi takeover, Goebbels insisted in speeches that the role of the German cinema was to serve as the "vanguard of the Nazi military".

The Goebbels film appears to have been intended as a virulently antisemitic remake of the 1933 British film The Wandering Jew, which argued that Jews were victims of relentless persecution throughout history. Saul Friedländer suggests that Goebbels' intent was to counter three films: Jew Süss, The House of Rothschild, and The Wandering Jew. These three films, all released in 1933–34, showed that Jews were persecuted throughout history; the Goebbels films presented the opposite message.

In 1937, a special wing of the Propaganda Ministry put on an art exhibition in Munich titled Der ewige Jude. It followed this up with the publication of a book of the same title, consisting of 265 photographs, each with a derogatory caption asserting the degeneracy of the Jews.

In November 1938, Goebbels made a series of attacks against the Jews in the German media that were a factor leading to the pogrom known as Kristallnacht. Despite the emotional satisfaction afforded the Nazis by carrying out their antisemitism with direct violence, Kristallnacht was considered by Hitler to have been a political disaster both within Germany and internationally. Not only did the brutality indirectly caused by Goebbels evoke harsh criticism internationally, the mixed reaction in the German media showed a lack of broad-based support among Germans for antisemitic violence.

Hitler expressed his frustration and anger at the mixed response from the German media and insisted that, instead of openly calling for violence against the Jews as Goebbels had in instigating the pogrom, Nazi propaganda should "elucidate events of foreign policy" in such a way that the German people themselves would call for violence against the Jews.

In response to Hitler's harsh reprimand, Goebbels launched a campaign to promote the antisemitic views of the Nazis to the German populace. He ordered each film studio to make an antisemitic film. In the case of The Eternal Jew, Goebbels conceived of a film that would communicate to the German people the same antisemitic message that had been the theme of the 1937 Munich exhibition. Hitler preferred films such as The Eternal Jew which presented the Nazi antisemitic agenda openly and directly; however Goebbels disliked the crudeness of such straightforward approaches, preferring the much more subtle approach of couching antisemitic messages in an engaging story with popular appeal. The film Jud Süß is an example of Goebbels' preferred approach.

== Production ==
Although Goebbels did not generally take an active role in particular films' production, he elected to do so in the case of major propaganda such as The Eternal Jew. The film was in production for over a year. Throughout the end of 1939 and the beginning of 1940, Goebbels devoted "constant attention" to the production of what he referred to as "the Jew film". Hippler had directed a documentary entitled Feldzug in Polen that was released in February 1940 to great success, and it was for this reason that he was chosen by Goebbels to direct The Ethernal Jew.

As early as 1938, Goebbels had wanted to have a film crew travel to Poland to shoot the ghetto scenes; however, he was unable to gain permission from the Polish government. In October and November 1939, almost immediately after the German-Soviet invasion of Poland, he instructed Hippler to send camera crews to Łódź, Warsaw, Kraków and Lublin to shoot footage of Polish Jews. Goebbels was disappointed with the footage Hippler shot as he wanted more footage of "Jewish types of all kinds". He sent Eberhard Fangauf and Josef Henke to advise Hippler and Eberhard Taubert's camera crews.

A rough cut was completed by 18 November 1939. Otto von Kursell suggested ending the film with Hitler's speech from 30 January. Goebbels made additional edits shortly before the German invasion of western Europe.

The footage that Hippler shot in the Jewish ghettos of those cities in German-occupied Poland was the only footage shot specifically for the purpose of the film. At the beginning, animated text informs the audience that this "documentary footage" shows Jews in their original state "before they put on the mask of civilized Europeans." In the Nazi press, Hippler expanded on this claim, asserting that his filming techniques captured Jews "in an unprejudiced manner, real to life as they live and as they react in their own surroundings."

Although Hippler advertised the film as being a factual documentary consisting of pictures of real Jews with nothing faked or simulated, his claims were complete falsehoods. In reality, the film was an exercise in manipulation for the purposes of propaganda. In shooting his footage, Hippler did in fact simulate scenes and use actors who were performing under duress and without knowledge of how the footage would be employed. For example, in order to get shots of Jewish worship services, Hippler and Goebbels assembled the congregation of the Vilker synagogue and ordered them to wear the tallithim and tefillin and to hold a full-scale service. When the Germans ordered the Torah reader to read from the Torah, he started by saying on camera "Today is Tuesday" signalling that his reading of the Torah was coerced since it was not customary to read the Torah on Tuesdays.

Aside from the footage shot in Poland, the rest of the film consisted of stills and archival footage from feature films (such as 1931's M and 1934's The House of Rothschild, the latter being a Hollywood production) often without permission, that the film presented as if they were documentary footage. The film used an excerpt from the 1934 American film The House of Rothschild that was presented out of context. A scene that was presented as comical where the members of the Rothschild family hide their expensive clothing and put on shabby clothes when a local tax-collector pays them a visit was presented as an example of dishonest business practices.

== Format and structure ==
The film was produced in a documentary format and, like other Hippler films, relied heavily on narration.

The film can be roughly divided into four thematic areas:

- Recordings from Polish ghettos
- Enumeration and evaluation of numerous political, cultural and social values in the international arena of Jewish origin
- Jewish religious ceremonies, religious instruction, worship, ritual slaughter
- Adolf Hitler's Reichstag speech, parading SA troops

== Themes ==
Richard Barsam writes the film's "essential contrast is between myths and stereotypes of Jews and the Nazi ideal of a 'master race,' between the alleged inferiority of the Jews and the superiority of the Germans." According to Stephen Fritz, Goebbels' intent was to create a film that would serve as "both a demonstration of the parasitical nature of the Jews and a justification for drastic measures against them." Maria Tatar writes that the Nazis were able to use Hippler's film to "position the victims of their genocidal project as dangerous aggressors who had to be exterminated." Similarly, Barsam describes the film as arguing that "Jews are criminals;... they have no soul;... they are different in every way;... killing them is not a crime, but a necessity—just as killing rats is a necessity to preserve health and cleanliness."

Unser Wille und Weg (Our Will and Way), a Nazi Party monthly publication aimed at propagandists, provides a rationale for why The Eternal Jew was made. The author of the essay "The Film of a 2000-Year Rat Migration," who remains anonymous, believes the film shows "a full picture of Jewry" and provides "the best treatment of this parasitic race." The author connects the Jews' migration from the Middle East to Egypt and their following of German colonists to rats traveling as a group, who "even then displayed the same criminal traits that they still displayed". The film is complimented for "its portrayal of the Jews' vulgar methods and the brutality and all-devouring hatred they exhibit when they reach their goal and control finance." The slaughtering method causes the author to question the "so-called Jewish religion", as grinning butchers do their work. In closing, the author states the film will be a valuable tool in the struggle to break the Jews' "power over us. We are the initiators of the fight against world Jewry, which now directs its hate, its brutal greed and destructive will toward us. We must win this battle for ourselves, for Europe, for the world."

Many Germans drew a distinction between the ostjuden ("Eastern Jews"), the rather derogatory term for the Ashkenazim (the Yiddish-speaking Jews of Eastern Europe) who usually lived in poverty vs. the more assimilated and better off German Jews. In the early 20th century there was a moral panic in Germany about allegations that too many illegal Jewish immigrants from Eastern Europe were settling in the Reich, and that in turn the illegal immigrants were criminals and/or were spreading infectious diseases. The Canadian scholar Paul Coates noted that Eastern Europe was usually presented in German films in the first half of the 20th century in a negative way, being portrayed as a backward, barbaric place that was sinister and threatening. Coates argued that popularity of films that used Eastern European folklore about vampires as a subject matter were a metaphor for the Askenazim who were often compared to vampires that were sucking the life out of the German economy. The Eternal Jew sought to channel such fears with its claims that all of the allegations made against the Ashkenazim were true in the most lucid terms possible. The Eternal Jew goes out of its way to depict the Ashkenazim as alike to animals, most notably the scene where rats turned into stereotypical ostjuden who then turn into stereotypical German Jews. In turn, the film portrayed the ostjuden as being precisely the "eternal Jew", namely who all Jews really were, when removed of their outward signs of assimilation. The film attempts to conflate all Jews with the Ashkenazim of Eastern Europe, who were the type of Jews who Germans disliked the most. The widespread dislike in Germany of Askhenazim was shared even by many German Jews who looked down on the Askenazim, and used the pejorative term ostjuden to describe them.. The film's thesis was to counter the widespread assumption that many Germans made that the "white Jews" of Germany and Austria who had embraced the German language and culture were different and better from the "black Jews" of Eastern Europe as the film argued all Jews were the same. Coates described The Eternal Jew as extremely dehumanizing in its picture of Jews who were portrayed as disgusting animals.

=== Jews as an uncivilized and parasitic people ===
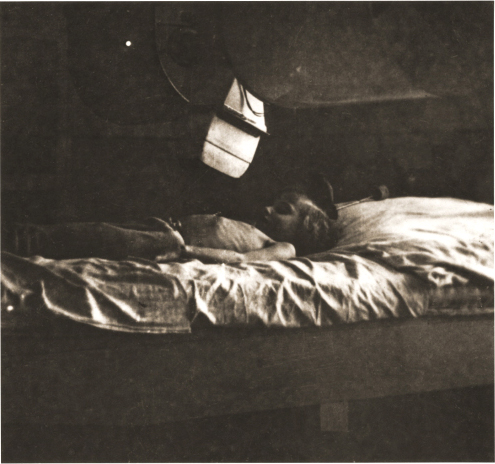
Photographs such as this served to record the horrors of life in the Łódź Ghetto for posterity.

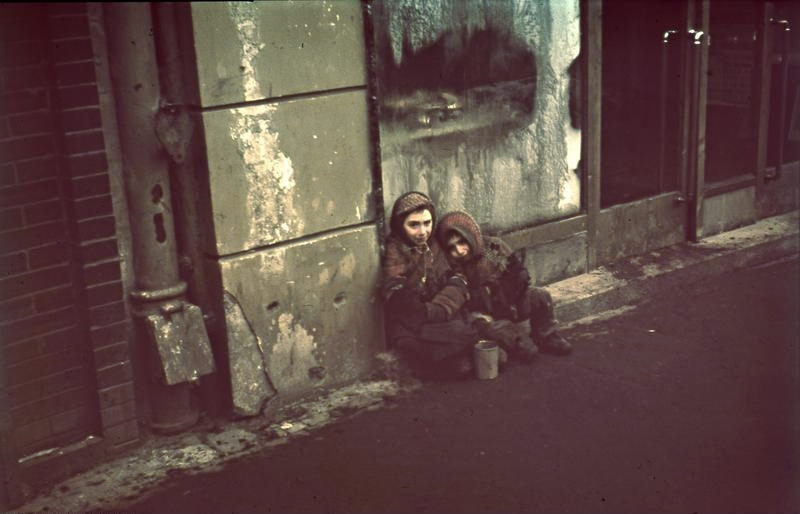
Ghetto children

Richard Taylor describes the basic tenet of the film as arguing that "the Jew is an oriental barbarian who has insinuated himself cleverly into European society, and now exploits it parasitically." This point is emphasized throughout the film, starting from the very opening lines of the film's commentary:

The "civilized" Jews that we know in Germany give us only an incomplete picture of their racial character. This film shows genuine shots of the Polish ghettos. It shows the Jews as they really are, before they conceal themselves behind the mask of the civilized European.

Following this commentary, the film provides a succession of scenes in which Jews are portrayed as an uncivilized, parasitic people with low social standing. The images were mostly shot on site in the Warsaw Ghetto and other Polish ghettos, showing subjects who were deliberately chosen to be poorly dressed and dirty and who had partially toothless grins. The locations shown are dirty and infested by vermin. Robert Reimer asserts that a central theme of the film is the assertion that "Jews have always lived in the ghettos and in fact they choose to live this way." According to Reimer, the film asserts that ghettos are "ordinary [and] normal" aspects of Jewish life. Reimer charges that what the film is actually showing is not the normal life of Polish Jewry but rather the "effect of the Nazi administration and the disruption of the lives of millions of Polish Jews." Erik Barnouw describes the Warsaw Ghetto after the Nazi conquest as a place where "hundreds of thousands of Jews were herded by the Nazi conquerors into pockets of indescribable misery." He describes footage shot there as showing "half-starved, unshaven creatures caught in pathetic acts of barter – a pair of socks for a scrap of food." It is scenes such as these that the film presents as showing Jews "in their natural state."

The film utilizes a montage that juxtaposes these images of ghetto Jews with images of rats to draw an analogy between the migration of Jews from Eastern Europe and the migration of rats. For example, one of the shots shows a pack of rats emerging from a sewer, followed by a shot of a crowd of Jews in a bustling street of the Łódź Ghetto. Close-ups of those in the crowd reveal sickly, malformed facial features. The narrator states that, as rats are the vermin of the animal kingdom, Jews are the vermin of the human race and similarly spread disease and corruption. Unlike rats, however, the narrator continues, Jews have the uncanny ability to change their appearance and blend into their "human hosts." A scene depicts four bearded men in traditional religious Jewish clothing, then shows them shaved and in modern business suits, while the narrator explains that only a "trained eye" can distinguish their Jewish features.

"Where rats appear, they bring ruin by destroying mankind's goods and foodstuffs. In this way, they spread disease, plague, leprosy, typhoid fever, cholera, dysentery, and so on. They are cunning, cowardly and cruel and are found mostly in large packs. Among the animals, they represent the rudiment of an insidious, underground destruction – just like the Jews among human beings."

The film also claims that:

[Jewish people] need other people because they need the goods with which to carry on business. The things that are valued by the creative Aryan peoples have been reduced by the Jew to the level of a mere piece of merchandise, which he buys and sells but cannot produce himself. He leaves production to the labourers and peasants of the people upon whom he has imposed his presence. The Jews are a race without farmers and without manual labourers, a race of parasites.

According to Film Propaganda: Soviet Russia and Nazi Germany:

By showing the way in which Jews allegedly insinuate themselves from small-scale to large-scale operations by preying on others, the film returns to its original image of the Jew concealing himself 'behind the mask of the civilised European'. [...] According to the film, the Jew presents an insidious, because concealed, threat, and one that is growing and must be brought under control. The message of this part of the commentary is that Jews will always be Jews, and that the 'civilised European' Jew is only a guise for a new and more dangerous forms of parasitic exploitation.

=== Jews as manipulative ===
==== Changing outward appearances ====
The film also claims that the Jewish people ...

...change their outward appearances when they leave their Polish nests and go out into the rich world. [...] When he appears without them, then it is only the keen-eyed amongst us who recognise his racial origins. [...] It is true that their fathers and grandfathers still lived in ghettoes, but there is no trace left now in their external appearance. Here in the second and third generation, the Aryanisation has reached its zenith. [...] And people lacking in intuition allow themselves to be deceived by this mimicry and regard them as being in truth their equals. Therein lies the dreadful danger, for even these 'civilised' Jews remain foreign bodies in the organism of their hosts, no matter how much their outward appearance may correspond to that of their hosts.

==== Economic impact ====
The film claims:

"At the beginning of the twentieth century, Jews sit at the junction of the world financial markets. They are an international power. Only one percent of the world's population, with the help of their capital they terrorize the world stock exchanges, world opinion, and world politics."

The film blames Jews for inflation and unemployment in Germany. It charges that they had crept into all professions through usury, racketeering and crimes against German assets.

"Out of a thousand workers in Berlin, only two were Jews. For the start of 1933, out of one hundred prosecutors in Berlin 15 were Jews. Out of a hundred judges were 23 Jews. Out of a hundred lawyers 49 Jews. 52 Jews out of a hundred doctors. And out of every hundred of businessmen 60 Jews. The average wealth of Germans was 810 marks each. The average wealth of each Jew amounted to 10,000 marks."

The evidence for these assertions is unstated in the film. The occupational information is found in Germany's June 1933 census, which proves the claims made in the film to be greatly exaggerated.

In 1933, 5,600 Jewish doctors and 3,030 Jewish lawyers were practicing in Germany, corresponding to 11 percent of doctors and 16 percent of lawyers. Still, an exceptionally large number of successful lawsuits over equal citizenship and rights had been filed in the Weimar Republic, most of them by Jewish lawyers. The Nuremberg Laws specifically forbade German judges from citing any precedents by Jewish jurists and cut off Jewish doctors from reimbursement under public health care insurance.

In contrast, during the economic crisis between the end of World War I and the implementation of the Nuremberg Laws, Jews were disproportionately likely to be laid off from the labor market, to the point that 1 out of every 4 Jews had been laid off by 1935. The original set of layoffs also had the effect of concentrating Jewish employment during this period into the professional and self-employed sectors, while post-1933 delicensing and other Nuremberg legislation gradually pushed Jews completely out of professional occupations and into positions such as street peddlers.

The reference to average wealth probably used the wealth of the Jewish Rothschild family as the basis for its calculation. The Rothschild banking family is still believed to have had the largest private fortune in the world during the 19th century, as well as the largest fortune in modern world history. Although the Creditanstalt debts were assumed in part by the Austrian branch of the Rothschild family, its bankruptcy was later used by Hitler as an example of how the Jews were responsible for all the economic and social troubles of Germany and the world.

The film goes on to assert that: "The most common expressions in the jargon of international gangsters and criminals stem from Hebrew and Yiddish words." According to the movie, Jews are likewise disproportionately plentiful in organized crime, where they represent 82% of international crime organizations, and 98% of international prostitution. This Jewish influence is seen as well in the international language used by criminals (see also Rotwelsch). The evidence for these blatant assertions is nowhere produced. Insofar as "organized crime" represents lawbreaking other than that forced by the Nuremberg Laws, it has not been corroborated by subsequent research.

It further claims that the Jewish people have some kind of "genetic predisposition towards barter and haggling", saying that "[Jewish people] rush into trade" because it is fitting "with their character and inclination", and that "For the Jew, there is but one object of value – money. How he earns it is a matter of complete indifference to him." It also accuses Jews of passing corruption on to their children by religious means, saying that:

These children see no ideals before them like our own. The egoism of the individual is not used in the service of higher common goals. On the contrary, Jewish racial morality claims, in contrast to Aryan morality, that the unrestrained egoism of each Jew is a divine law. His religion makes a duty out of treachery and usury.

=== Jews as abnormal and depraved ===
In a long sequence of images, the film provides examples to illustrate its claims that Aryan/European culture had been corrupted by Jews.

This sequence includes footage of notable figures who had earned Hitler's wrath, such as physicist and Nobel laureate Albert Einstein and Spartacist uprising leader Rosa Luxemburg (erroneously named as one and the same person as anarchist Emma Goldman) as representatives of so-called "international Jewry". Einstein's image was juxtaposed with a series of images about the supposed Jewish control of the pornography industry. Einstein was characterized as "the relativity Jew, who masks his hatred of Germany behind his obscure pseudo-sciences".

Other clips presented Jewish (or supposedly Jewish) actors from the Weimar era such as Curt Bois, Fritz Kortner, Peter Lorre, and Ernst Lubitsch. Charlie Chaplin was also included and inaccurately identified as Jewish, possibly as a consequence of his role as the Jewish barber in The Great Dictator.

Two scenes from the 1934 Hollywood film The House of Rothschild are featured; the first depicts Mayer Rothschild, a rich man, hiding money and putting on old, shabby clothes in order to fool a corrupt tax collector. The second shows him speaking to his sons, encouraging them to start an international banking business to take advantage of nations' misfortunes in times of war. The clips were used without permission.

The film's narrator asserts that: "the Jew is instinctively interested in everything abnormal and depraved." To illustrate this point, Hippler includes a scene from Fritz Lang's film M in which the child murderer Hans Beckert (played by Peter Lorre) makes an impassioned plea to the "jury" of criminals, begging for his life and disclaiming responsibility for his crimes on account of insanity. Beckert shrieks, "... it burns within me. I must go the way I am driven. Who knows what is going on inside me? How I must – not want, must!" According to Sharon Packer, Hitler used this scene to assert that "Jews transmit inheritable criminality and therefore deserve to die."

=== Degenerate art ===
The film proceeds to suggest that pictorial art and music have degenerated under Jewish influence, with many spurious examples given. Degenerate art included works of abstract art as well as those from specific individuals such as George Grosz and Emil Nolde, while degenerate music included jazz and so-called Negermusik, although here the connection to Jewry is unknown.

=== Jewish religious practice ===
After showing how Jews have supposedly been responsible for the decline of Western music, science, art, and commerce, Hippler presents a scene of a cow being slaughtered for meat by a shochet (Jewish ritual slaughterer). The scene is prefaced by a warning similar to that in Frankenstein, warning the squeamish about what is coming next. This extended sequence, lasting roughly 3½ minutes, shows cows and sheep in their death throes as they bleed to death. The producers apparently filmed this scene because of Hitler's opposition to animal cruelty. He had banned kosher slaughter of animals in Germany and felt that such footage would shock the German public.

This scene was cut from the version intended for young audiences.

"These images are a clear proof of the cruelty of Schächtmethode. They also reveal the character of a race, their blunt brutality hidden under the guise of religious worship. "

=== Hitler's Reichstag speech ===
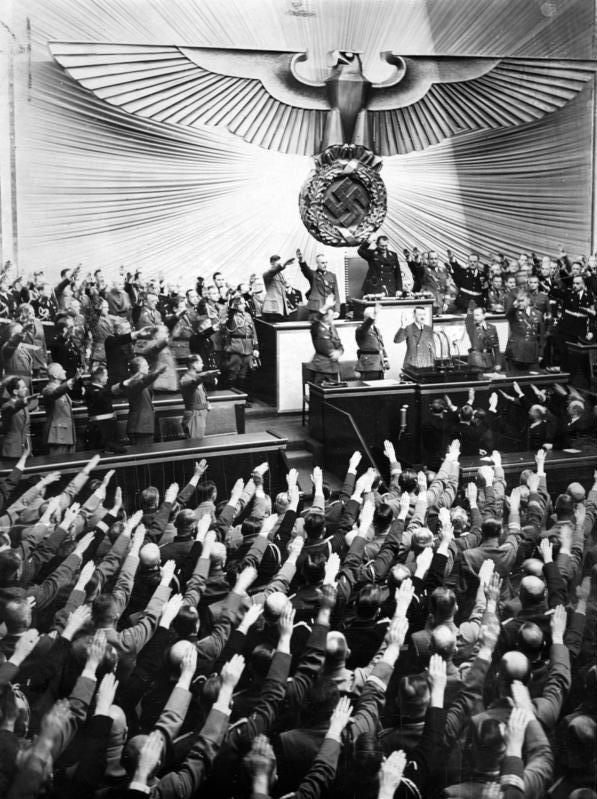
The audience giving a Nazi salute during the speech

The film concludes with footage of Hitler's 30 January 1939 Reichstag speech in which he proclaims the well-known statement:

"If international Jewish financiers in and outside Europe should succeed in plunging the nations once more into a world war, the result will not be Bolshevization of the earth and thus the victory of Jewry, but the annihilation of the Jewish race in Europe!"

The film ends with images of brown-shirted SA troops on parade.

== Release and reception ==
The Eternal Jew premiered in Berlin on 28 November 1940. The documentary short The German East and a performance of Ludwig van Beethoven's Egmont were shown before the film. The number of theatres showing the film dropped off quickly with it falling from 66 theatres in Berlin on 29 November to one theatre by 13 December. The Sicherheitsdienst blamed the film's failure due to its being released too soon after Jud Süß.

The actors in Jud Süß were leading German stars of the time. In contrast, Der ewige Jude's only original footage was of Jews in the Polish ghetto and animated maps. All the other footage consisted of stills and excerpts from other films.

Thus, unlike Jud Süß, which was a box office hit, Der ewige Jude was a commercial flop. David Culbert asserts that it is unlikely that there were more than one million paid admissions compared to over 20 million paid admissions to Jud Süß. The film was more known by word-of-mouth descriptions than from people actually viewing it. Some Germans were quoted as saying "We've already seen enough Jewish filth. We don't need to see any more."

The film was chiefly screened by party supporters and Nazi organizations like the Hitler Youth and the SS. Its themes and content made it a topic of discussion by a wider audience that never saw it. Heinrich Himmler invited to screen it for SS-Einsatzgruppen troops headed for the Eastern Front to carry out the "Final Solution".

== Postwar legacy ==
In 1946, Hippler was tried for directing Der ewige Jude but was found not guilty. Hippler contended Joseph Goebbels was the true creator of The Eternal Jew with Hitler's close supervision. He claimed that Goebbels gave Hippler credit as a reward "for his excellent work in the newsreel department".

Hippler was interviewed in the Emmy Award-winning program "The Propaganda Battle" in the PBS series Walk Through the Twentieth Century (1983–1984). In this interview, he stated that he regretted being listed as the director of The Eternal Jew because it resulted in being interrogated by the Allies after the war. He thought this was unfair because, in his opinion, he had nothing to do with the killing of Jews. In an interview shown in the ZDF documentary series Holocaust (2000), the 90-year-old Hippler described the film as "the most disgraceful example of antisemitism." Narrator Harry Giese went on to provide narration for other films, but as he was associated with this and other Third Reich films, he found less work in the post-war German cinema of the 1950s and 60s.

== Availability ==
Public distribution and exhibition is prohibited in Germany. The only exception is for use in academia; however, exhibitors must have formal education in "media science and the history of the Holocaust", and it can only be screened in a censored version with annotations.

== See also ==
- List of films made in the Third Reich
- Nazism and cinema
- The International Jew
- Henry Ford § The Dearborn Independent and antisemitism
- Protocols of the Elders of Zion
- Antisemitic canard
- History of the Jews in Poland

== Works cited ==
- Niven, Bill (2018). Hitler and Film: The Führer's Hidden Passion. Yale University Press. ISBN 9780300200362.

Preceded by Feldzug in Polen (1940)	Hippler Propaganda films The Eternal Jew (1940)	Succeeded by Die Frontschau (1941–1943)
