= List of German films of 1933–1945 =

The Third Reich era of Germany (“Nazi Germany”) lasted from Adolf Hitler's assumption of power on 30 January 1933 to Karl Dönitz's surrender at the end of World War II on 8 May 1945.

A total of 1,084 feature films were shown in cinemas in Nazi Germany.

== 1933 ==
Note: This year includes films released during both the Weimar and Nazi eras

== Series ==
Note: These were series of films that, in most cases, spanned multiple years.

Title	Director	Cast	Genre	Notes
Agfa-Schmalfilm-Monatsschau				Produced by IG Farben
Degeto Weltspiegel				
Deulig-Tonwoche				
Die Deutsche Monatsschau		The German Monthly Show; newsreel series		
Die Deutsche Wochenschau		The German Weekly Show; newsreel series		
Deutscher Sport im Kriegsjahr				Produced by IG Farben
Echo der Heimat				
Die Frontschau	Fritz Hippler	The Front Show; Series of technical films shown to soldiers before they were sent to the Eastern Front		
Junges Europa				
Panorama				Monthly news human interest series; in color
Tobis-Wochenschau				
Ufa-Auslands-Tonwoche				
Ufa-Europa-Woche				
UFA Tonewoche				

== Uncompleted or unreleased ==
Films that could not be complete or released until after the end of World War II.

Title	Director	Cast	Genre	Notes
Eine alltägliche Geschichte	Günther Rittau	Gustav Fröhlich, Marianne Simson, Karl Schönböck		An everyday story
Am Ende der Welt	Gustav Ucicky	Brigitte Horney, Attila Hörbiger, Bogusław Samborski		At the end of the world
Das Ghetto			Documentary	Filmed in 1942, never finished; subject of the 2010 documentary A Film Unfinished
Das Leben geht weiter	Wolfgang Liebeneiner	Heinrich George, Marianne Hoppe, Hilde Krahl, Viktor de Kowa, Gustav Knuth		Life Continues
Das kalte Herz	Karl Ulrich Schnabel			Filmed in 1933 and released 2016
Das Mädchen Juanita	Wolfgang Staudte		Documentary	
Shiva und die Galgenblume	Hans Steinhoff	Hans Albers		In Agfacolor
Tiefland	Leni Riefenstahl			Filmed 1940–1944, the film was completed after World War II and released in 1954
Unter den Brücken	Helmut Käutner			Under the Bridges

== See also ==
- List of Nazi propaganda films
- Nazism and cinema
- Department of Film (Nazi Germany)
- Cinema of Germany
- Reichsfilmarchiv
- Reichsfilmkammer
- List of films set in Berlin
- List of World War II films
