= Fritz Hippler =

German film director (1909–2002)

- Born: 17 August 1909; Berlin, Kingdom of Prussia, German Empire
- Died: 22 May 2002 (aged 92); Berchtesgaden, Bavaria, Germany
- Occupations: Director, filmmaker
- Known for: Director of the film Der Ewige Jude
- Spouse: Charlotte Tiedemann (divorced)

Fritz Hippler (17 August 1909 – 22 May 2002) was a German filmmaker who ran the film department in the Propaganda Ministry of Nazi Germany, under Joseph Goebbels. He is best known as the director of the propaganda film Der Ewige Jude (The Eternal Jew).

== Early life and education ==
Hippler was born and brought up in Berlin as the son of a petty official. His father died in 1918 in the First World War in France. Hippler resented the Treaty of Versailles and its associated regulations, such as the assignment of the Danzig Corridor, the occupation of the Rhineland and the disarmament of Germany as unjustified humiliation, and rejected the Weimar democracy.

In 1925 when he was 17, Hippler joined the Nazi Party.

In 1927, Hippler became a member of the NSD Studentbund - the National Socialist German Students' League. Later he studied law in Heidelberg and Berlin. He was a member of the Teutonia dueling society in Heidelberg and the Arminia dueling society in Berlin. In 1932 he became NSDAP district speaker. In 1933 he was appointed the district and high school group leader for Berlin-Brandenburg in the National Socialist German Students' League.

Hippler was a supporter of expressionism. As the leader of the National Socialist German Students' League of Berlin he organised an exhibition in Humboldt University of Berlin for expressionist painters, for which he was vehemently attacked by the Nazi ideologist Alfred Rosenberg.

In 1932, Hippler was expelled from Humboldt University for participating in violent Nazi rallies. On 19 April 1933, the new National Socialist Education Minister Bernhard Rust repealed any disciplinary actions against students associated with the NSDAP, thus reinstating Hippler.

On 22 May 1933, he gave a speech initiating a march from the student house in the Oranienburger Straße to Opernplatz with books which were then burned.

In June 1933 Hippler participated in a violent rally opposite the stock exchange, against Alfred Hugenberg then minister of finance and still Hitler's rival, calling Hitler to disavow him and remove him from power.

Hippler was later involved in a dispute over the direction of arts policy. He was satisfied with the anti-Jewish orientation of the arts policy and the consequent banishment of that art from museums and art dealers who had been created by Jews. However, in July 1933 at a rally of the National Socialist Student League in the lecture hall of the Berlin University, he criticised the harsh action of some Nazi circles against the German modern artists like Emile Nolde and Barlach, the artists group Die Brücke, which was propagated by elements of the Nazi leadership as part of efforts against the Degenerate Art. Although Goebbels was a lover of Nolde, this direction after a word of argument was in favour of the more radical of Hitler's National Socialists, whose spokesman was Alfred Rosenberg and his Combat League for German Culture.

Fritz Hippler earned his PhD in 1934 at the Heidelberg University with Arnold Bergstraesser and a dissertation titled "State and Society in the Thinking of John Stuart Mill, Karl Marx, and Paul de Lagarde. A contribution to the sociological thinking of the present time".

== Career in film production ==
After receiving his doctorate in 1934, Hippler became a lecturer at the German University of Policy in Berlin. From 1936 he worked as assistant to Hans Weidemann working on the production of German newsreels, directed in the Reich Ministry for Public Enlightenment and Propaganda. Here he learned the production of documentaries. In January 1939, he took over Weidemann's position. In August 1939, Goebbels promoted Hippler again. He appointed the 29-year-old Hippler to head the film department at the Reich Ministry for Public Enlightenment and Propaganda RMVP. In February 1942, he appointed him as Reichsfilmintendant. With these two functions, Hippler was one of the most important politicians of the film "Third Reich" after Goebbels. In October 1942, he was Director in the RMVP. His task was control, supervision and direction of German film making. In 1938, Hippler was appointed to the rank of SS Hauptsturmführer. According to Veit Harlan, Hippler loved to wear his SS uniform.

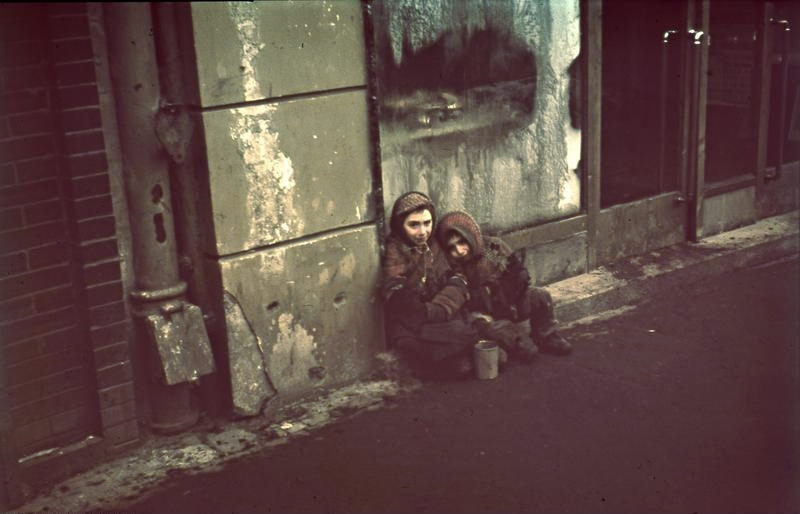
Warsaw Ghetto children shown in the film The Eternal Jew

In his ministerial functions, Hippler continued to produce films. In 1939–1940 Hippler directed the 1940 propaganda documentary Feldzug in Polen about the Third Reich's invasion and occupation of Poland in 1939. In 1940, he was responsible for the management and design of the feature-length documentary film The Eternal Jew—according to Courtade, History of Film in the Third Reich, "the vilest anti-Semitic Nazi films". The film historian Frank Noack assessed The Eternal Jew as "probably the most radical inflammatory film of all time". An article written by Hippler in the magazine "The film" about its creation marked Jews as "parasites of national degeneracy". He deliberately filmed conditions within the Warsaw Ghetto to show the starving inhabitants, conditions designed by the Germans to increase the death rate. The film served as a preparation and agreement of the population in the coming holocaust and was mainly used for training of police and SS troops. In the same year, as recognition for his service to the Reich, Adolf Hitler bestowed a secret endowment of 60,000 Reichsmarks to Hippler.

In 1941 Die Frontschau (The Frontshow), a series of shorts shown to soldiers before being sent to the Eastern Front. In 1942, Hippler published a book about film theory titled Betrachtungen zum Filmschaffen (i.e., Contemplations on Filmmaking), which included a preface by Emil Jannings. By 1943, he was promoted to Obersturmbannführer.

== Conflict with Goebbels ==
Goebbels could usually count on his young people but frequently he criticized their shortcomings. As early as 1939, he recorded in his diaries that Hippler was intelligent but cheeky, contradictory and immature. Goebbels complained repeatedly about the disorganisation of the film department. Hippler suffered apparently with alcohol addiction. Goebbels finally discharged Hippler in June 1943 due to "mishaps, alcoholism and family problems”, although Hippler claimed in his memoirs that he was removed due to his choice of Erich Kaestner for the screenplay of the film Münchhausen even though several of Kaestner's books and plays had been banned by the Nazis in 1933. After his dismissal, Hippler was accused of falsely denying his partial Jewish descent and demoted from his SS rank. Hippler was sent to an infantry replacement battalion of the country, according to Strauss and underwent mountain infantry training. Then he was again released from active duty and used until February 1945 as a front cameraman to produce material for newsreels. On 3 May 1945, he flew into Hamburg as a British prisoner of war.

== Postwar ==
After the end of the Second World War, Hippler was interned and sentenced to two years in prison. He was able to stage a comeback after his release. He was interviewed in the Bill Moyers PBS documentary series A Walk Through the 20th Century in 1982. Hippler died on 22 May 2002, at the age of 92. He is portrayed by Cary Elwes in the 2001 television film Uprising, and by Ralf Bauer in the 2010 film Jew Suss: Rise and Fall.

== Filmography ==
- Wort und Tat Words and Deeds. A documentary film 1938, director
- Der Westwall The Western Wall 1939, director
- Feldzug in Polen Campaign in Poland 1939–40, director
- Der ewige Jude (The Eternal Jew) "Film contribution to the problem of world Jewry" (1940, directed, co-ordination)
- Several short film revues for the Die Frontschau (The Front Show) (1941, director)
- Sieg im Westen (Victory in the West) (1941, producer), a film about the campaign against France and the Benelux countries.
- Der Fuhrer und Sein Volk (1942, director)
- Orient Express (1944, producer)
- Interview with Hippler (1981, A Walk Through the 20th Century)

== Books ==
- "Betrachtungen zum Filmschaffen", 2nd Ed, Berlin (Hesse's Publishing) 1942
- "Die Verstrickung. Einstellungen und Rückblenden von Fritz Hippler ehemaliger Reichsfilmintendant unter Josef Goebbels", Düsseldorf revised second Edition 1982
- "Meinungsdressur? Ein heiter-kritisches Fernsehtagebuch", Mountain / Lake Starnberg (Kurt Vowinckel Verlag) 1985
- "Verbrecher Mensch? Die Beobachtungen des Historikers Johannes Scherr", Mountain / Lake Starnberg ( Türmer-Verlag) 1987
- "Schopenhauer heute. Denkanstöße und Kostproben", Mountain / Lake Starnberg (Türmer-Verlag) 1988
- "Korrekturen: Zeitgeschichtliche Spurensuche, einmal anders", Mountain / Lake Starnberg (Mountain Publishing Company) 1995
- "Einspruch Euer Ehren: Den Zeitgeist an den Pranger. Narreteien aus der deutschen Provinz", Mountain / Lake Starnberg (Mountain Publishing Company) 1999
