= List of films banned in Germany =

This is a list of films that are or were banned in Germany.

== Weimar Republic (1918–1933) ==
Date	Title	Notes
1920–1945	Anders als die Andern (Different from the Others)	Banned due to homosexual themes. During the 1920s, it was restricted for viewing to doctors and medical researchers only. After Hitler came to power in 1933, it was banned again and mostly destroyed by the Nazis. The film was later partially reconstructed.
1929	The Barnyard Battle (1929)	Banned initially because the cats in this Mickey Mouse cartoon wear helmets that resemble German pickelhaube. Today the ban is no longer in effect.
1930–1931 and again from 1933 to 1945	All Quiet on the Western Front (1929)	Banned in 1930 after protests but then re-admitted in a heavily censored version in 1931 after public debate. After 1933, it was banned by the Nazi regime for its anti-militaristic themes and being "anti-German". Erich Maria Remarque's novel was also banned as well, and was among the "anti-German" books burned in bonfires. At the Capitol Theatre in West Germany in 1952, the film saw its first release in 22 years.
1932–1945	Kuhle Wampe	Banned because it depicted the government, legal system, and religion in a negative light. Eventually, the ban was lifted due to protests and the film was released in a severely edited version. Six months later, Hitler came into power, causing the movie to be banned again under the Nazi regime until the end of the war. Its director, Slatan Dudow, was arrested for being a member of the Communist Party and banned from entering the country again.

== Nazi Germany (1933–1945) ==
Date	Title	Notes
1933–1945	All movies starring the Marx Brothers.	Banned in Nazi Germany because the comedy stars were Jewish.
1933–1945	Battleship Potemkin	Banned in Nazi Germany due to fears it could inspire Marxism.
1933–1945	Ecstasy	Banned in Nazi Germany because of the erotic content.
1933–1945	Mädchen in Uniform	Banned in Nazi Germany because of its lesbian theme.
1933–1945	The Mad Doctor	Banned in Nazi Germany, because of the horror atmosphere in this Mickey Mouse short.
1933−1945	Mysterium des Geschlechtes	Banned in Nazi Germany because of the erotic content.
1933−1945	Vier von der Infanterie (Westfront 1918, also known as Comrades of 1918)	Banned in Nazi Germany for being a pacifist war drama.
1934–1945	M - Eine Stadt sucht einen Mörder	Banned in Nazi Germany.
1934–1945	Nana	Banned in Nazi Germany because of its plot, depicting a soldier visiting a prostitute, which violated the military's sensibilities and honor code.
1934–1945	The Prizefighter and the Lady (1933)	Banned in Nazi Germany because Max Baer was Jewish.
1934–1945	The Testament of Dr. Mabuse	Banned in Nazi Germany for "presenting criminal acts so detailed and fascinating that they might tempt copy-cats". It also had an anti-authoritarian tone and certain dialogue of Mabuse was lifted directly from Mein Kampf.
1936–1945	The Bohemian Girl	Banned in Nazi Germany, because the positive depiction of Roma people "had no place" in the Third Reich.
1936–1956	Modern Times	Banned in Nazi Germany for supposedly advocating Communism.
1936	One in a Million	Briefly banned in Nazi Germany for featuring the Ritz Brothers, who were a Jewish American comedy trio. After its star, Sonja Henje, who had recently been among the champions of the 1936 Summer Olympics in Berlin, made a phone call to Propaganda Minister Joseph Goebbels on his private line, the film was edited to remove scenes that featured the trio.
1937–1945	La Grande Illusion	Banned in Nazi Germany for its anti-war message. Head of Propaganda Joseph Goebbels named its director Jean Renoir "Cinematographic Enemy Number One".
1938–1950	A Prussian Love Story	Banned in Nazi Germany because the plot of a love affair between the Emperor and an actress was too similar to Head of Propaganda Goebbels's own affair. Even after the war it took until 1950 before the film saw a release.
1939–1945	Kitty und die Weltkonferenz (Kitty and the World Conference)	Banned in Nazi Germany despite an initially successful box office run. Following the outbreak of the Second World War that same year, Propaganda Minister Joseph Goebbels withdrew it from cinemas as he felt it presented a too favourable view of Great Britain.
1939–1977	Confessions of a Nazi Spy (1939)	The first anti-Nazi movie made in Hollywood before the start of World War II, Adolf Hitler banned it and all Warner Bros. films from exhibition throughout the remainder of his tenure as German chancellor. He reportedly planned to execute the makers of this film upon winning the war. It was not publicly screened in Germany until 11 March 1977.
1939–1945	Mr. Smith Goes to Washington	Banned in Nazi Germany because it showed democracy working well.
1940–1945	The Great Dictator	Banned in Nazi Germany for mocking Nazism and Hitler. During World War II, it was once shown to German soldiers in 1942: In German-occupied Yugoslavia, local guerillas sneaked a copy from Greece into an army-cinema in an act of cultural sabotage. After half of the film had been shown, German officers stopped the screening and threatened to shoot the Yugoslavian projectionist. Apparently, the film was ordered by the Reich Chancellery. It was first shown in West Germany as late as 1958.
1940–1945	La Kermesse Heroïque (Carnival in Flanders) (1935)	Banned in Nazi Germany and Belgium by Joseph Goebbels because of its pacifist themes. The director, Jacques Feyder, was later hunted down for arrest, but managed to escape to Switzerland.
1943–1949	Titanic (1943)	Banned in Nazi Germany by Joseph Goebbels because some of the scenes could demoralize the audience, despite being made by the Nazi propaganda department itself. The Allied Control Council banned the film after the war too, because of its Nazi propaganda. After the end of the occupation, the German Motion picture rating system classified it to age 12 or older and to age 6 or older with parental guidance. It was sometimes shown on west German TV after the war and a censored, low quality VHS copy was released in 1992.
1944–1945	Große Freiheit Nr. 7 (Great Freedom No. 7)	Banned in Nazi Germany. It had its premiere in occupied Prague in December 1944.

== Allied-occupied Germany (1945–1949) ==
After the end of the Second World War, the British and American Allies initially confiscated the entire film stock of the Third Reich. A total of 700 feature films and 2500 short films were confiscated and films that were classified as harmless were returned to their rightful owners.

There is no definitive list of all the films banned by the Allies, as lost films were found over time and films found to be unproblematic were released again.

In March 1951, the following 141 feature films were still considered problematic by the “Film Section Information Services Division Control Commission for Germany, (BE)”.

1. National Socialist Propaganda

- Das alte Recht (1934)
- Am seidenen Faden (1938)
- Ein Robinson (Das Tagebuch eines Matrosen) (1940)
- Das Gewehr über (1939)
- Leinen aus Irland (1939)
- Mann für Mann (1939)
- Petermann ist dagegen (1937)
- ...reitet für Deutschland (1941)
- Venus vor Gericht (1941)

2. Nazi Party Propaganda

- Hans Westmar (Horst Wessel, einer von vielen) (1933)
- S.A.-Mann Brand (1933)

3. Nazi Youth Propaganda

- Hände hoch! (1942)
- Himmelhunde (1942)
- Jakko (1941)
- Junge Adler (1944)
- Jungens (1941)
- Kopf hoch, Johannes! (1941)
- Wunder des Fliegens (1935)

4. Mass Political Propaganda

- Annelie (Die Geschichte eines Lebens) (1941)
- Die Degenhardts (1944)
- Der Stammbaum des Dr. Pistorius (1939)
- Wunschkonzert (1940)

5. Historical, Militarist Propaganda

- Der alte und der junge König (1935)
- Der Choral von Leuthen (1933)
- Das Flötenkonzert von Sanssouci (1930)
- Friedrich Schiller (Der Triumph eines Genies) (1940)
- Geheimakte W.B.1 (1942)
- Der große König (1942)
- Kadetten (1941)
- Kolberg (1945)

6. Historical, Political Propaganda

- Bismarck (1940)
- Die Entlassung (1942)
- Der unendliche Weg (1943)
- Wien 1910 (1942)

7. Historical Romance with Propaganda

- Die Affäre Roedern (1944)
- Der Fall Rainer (Ich warte auf dich) (1942)
- Das Fräulein von Barnhelm (1940)
- Kameraden (Ritt zwischen den Fronten) (1941)
- Die Nacht mit dem Kaiser (1936)
- Schwarzer Jäger Johanna (1934)
- Trenck, der Pandur (1940)
- Das unsterbliche Herz (1939)

8. Racial Propaganda

- Ewiger Wald (1936)

9. Anti-Semitic Propaganda

- Der ewige Jude (1940)
- Jud Süß (1940)
- Robert und Bertram (1939)
- Die Rothschilds (1940)

10. Austrian Anschluß Propaganda

- Wetterleuchten um Barbara (1941)

11. Anti-British Propaganda

- Anschlag auf Baku (1942)
- Carl Peters (1941)
- Der Fuchs von Glenarvon (1940)
- Germanin (1943)
- Das Herz der Königin (1940)
- Mein Leben für Irland (1941)
- Ohm Krüger (1941)
- Titanic (1943)

12. Anti-American Propaganda

- Fünf Millionen suchen einen Erben (1938)
- Pedro soll hängen (1941)
- Sensationsprozess Casilla (1939)
- Der verlorene Sohn (1934)

13. Anti-Soviet Propaganda

- Flüchtlinge (1933)
- Friesennot (Dorf im roten Sturm) (1935)
- G.P.U. (1942)
- Weiße Sklaven (Panzerkreuzer Sewastopol) (1936)

14. Anti-Polish Propaganda

- Feinde (1940)
- Heimkehr (1941)

15. Anti-Czech Propaganda

- Die goldene Stadt (1942)

16. Anti-Yugoslav Propaganda

- Menschen im Sturm (1941)

17. Euthanasia Propaganda

- Ich klage an (1941)

18. Army Propaganda

- Dreizehn Mann und eine Kanone (1938)
- Der Etappenhase (1937)
- Feldzug in Polen (1940)
- Musketier Meier III (1938)
- Soldaten - Kameraden (1936)
- Spähtrupp Hallgarten (1941)
- Stoßtrupp 1917 (1934)

19. Luftwaffe Propaganda

- D III 88 (1939)
- Feuertaufe (1940)
- Front am Himmel (1942)
- Kampfgeschwader Lützow (1941)
- Pour le Mérite (1938)
- Stukas (1941)
- Ziel in den Wolken (1938)

20. Naval Propaganda

- Morgenrot (1933)
- U-Boote westwärts! (1941)

21. Merchant Navy Propaganda

- Fahrt ins Leben (1940)

22. Militarist Propaganda

- Geheimzeichen LB 17 (1938)
- Der Gouverneur (1939)
- Die Nacht ohne Abschied (1943)
- Die Sporck'schen Jäger (1934)
- Standschütze Bruggler (1936)
- Über alles in der Welt (1941)

23. Resistance Propaganda

- Der Feuerteufel (1940)
- Der Rebell (1932)

24. Espionage and Sabotage Films

- Achtung! Feind hört mit! (1940)
- Alarmstufe V (1941)
- Falschmünzer (1940)
- Die goldene Spinne (1943)
- Verräter (1936)

25. Background Propaganda

- Ein schöner Tag (1943)
- Flucht ins Dunkel (1939)
- Die Geliebte (1939)
- Die große Liebe (1942)
- Liebe ist zollfrei (1941)
- Mit versiegelter Order (1938)
- Patrioten (1937)
- Reifende Jugend (1933)
- Salonwagen E 417 (1939)
- Sechs Tage Heimaturlaub (1941)
- Die Stimme aus dem Äther (1939)
- Zwei in einer großen Stadt (1942)
- Zwei Welten (1940)

26. Spanish Propaganda

- Raza (Blutzeuge) (1941)
- Der Stern von Tetuan (1939)

27. Slovak Propaganda

- Unter dem Tatrakreuz (?)

28. Italian Film (Propaganda)

- Alkazar (Kampf um den Alcazar) (1940)
- In der roten Hölle (?)
- Sentinelle di Bronzo (Schüsse in der Wüste) (1937)

29. Japanese Films (Propaganda)

- Das heilige Ziel (1938)
- "Japanischer Film" (?)
- Die Liebe der Mitsu (Die Tochter des Samurai) (1937)
- Nippons wilde Adler (1940)
- Der Weg nach Hawaii (?)

30. Veit Harlan films

- Alles für Veronika (1936)
- Der Herrscher (1937)
- Immensee (1943)
- Jugend (1938)
- Kater Lampe (1936)
- Krach im Hinterhaus (1935)
- Opfergang (1944)
- Die Reise nach Tilsit (1939)
- Verwehte Spuren (1938)

31. Forbidden by Selbstkontrolle

- Der ewige Quell (1939)
- Das Leben ruft (1944)
- Das Lied der Wüste (1939)

32. Uncuttable films

- Der dunkle Punkt (1940)
- Die große und die kleine Liebe (1938)
- Hochzeit auf Bärenhof (1942)
- Steputat und Co. (1938)
- Die unheimliche Wandlung des Alex Roscher (Der Spiegel der Helena) (1943)
- Zwielicht (1940)

== East Germany (1949–1990) ==
Date	Title	Notes
1965–1990	Das Kaninchen bin ich (The Rabbit Is Me)	Banned by the East-German Communist government for its criticism of everyday life in the country. While not directly referring to politics it still was perceived as dangerous criticism of the system. Due to the film's infamy all banned films in the DDR were referred to as "rabbit films". The film remained banned until Germany was unified again in 1990.
1965–1990	Denk bloss nicht, ich heule (Just Don't Think I'll Cry)	Banned by the East-German Communist government for its criticism of the regime.
1966–1990	Spur der Steine (Trace of Stones)	Banned by the East-German Communist government.
1971–1990	Die Russen kommen (The Russians Are Coming)	Banned by the East-German Communist government because of its theme where a young Nazi lives in fear of the approaching Russian army.

== West Germany (1949–1990) ==
=== List of films rejected by the "Interministerial Committee for East-West Film Issues" ===
In 1953, the "Interministerieller Ausschuß für Ost-West-Filmfragen" (Interministerial Committee for East-West Film Issues) was founded in West Germany. This committee examined films from the Eastern Bloc countries, especially DEFA productions from East Germany, for anti-constitutional or communist content.

Until the committee was dissolved in 1967 or 1968, around 130 films were banned from release.

Date	Title	Notes
1954–196?	The Adventures of Fridolin (1948)	In 1954, approval was granted only for clubs and scientific seminars.
1955–196?	Der Untertan (1951)	The film was only released for screening in student film clubs in 1955 because of "anticonstitutional" content.
1955–196?	Dr. Semmelweis (1950)	The release was refused in 1955.
1955–196?	Ernst Thälmann (1954)	The release was refused in 1955.
1955–1967	The Council of the Gods (1950)	The release was refused in 1955. The release was granted in 1967.
1956–196?	Besondere Kennzeichen: keine (1956)	The release was refused in 1956.
1956–196?	Der Teufelskreis (1956)	The release was refused in 1956.
1957–1958	Das tapfere Schneiderlein (1956)	The release was refused in 1957. The release was granted in 1958.
1957–196?	Corinna Schmidt (1951)	The release was refused in 1957. The release of an edited version was rejected in 1960.
1957–196?	Die Unbesiegbaren (1953)	The release was refused in 1957.
1957–196?	Du und mancher Kamerad (1956)	Banned because of "anticonstitutional" content.
1957–196?	Genesung (1956)	The release was refused in 1957.
1957–196?	Kein Hüsung (1954)	The release was refused in 1957.
1957–196?	Zwischenfall in Benderath (1956)	The release was refused in 1957.
1957–1965	Thomas Muentzer (1956)	The release was refused in 1957 because of "anticonstitutional" content, an edited version was also refused. The release was granted in 1965.
1958–196?	Berlin, Schoenhauser Corner (1957)	The release was refused in 1958.
1959–1966	Sie nannten ihn Amigo (1959)	The release was refused in 1959. The release was granted in 1966.
1960–196?	Sheriff Teddy (1957)	The release was refused in 1960.
1966–196?	Solange Leben in mir ist (1965)	The release was refused in 1966.
1966–1967	Die Sonnenbrucks (1951)	The release was refused in 1966. The release was granted in 1967.
	And Quiet Flows the Don (1958)	Banned because of "anticonstitutional" content. Part 1 was released in 1959, Parts 2 and 3 were first broadcast in television in 1968.
until 1965	Higher Principle (1960)	Banned until 1965 because of "anti-German" content.

=== List of films banned by the French Forces in Berlin ===
Date	Title	Notes
1958	Paths of Glory	The French city commander of Berlin at the time, General Arnaud Gèze, banned the screening of “Paths of Glory” on the grounds that the film discriminated against his own troops. French soldiers rioted at the premiere in the British sector. They threw stink bombs, set off firecrackers and blew trumpets. Four days later, Gèze even sent back an honorary ticket for the opening event of the Berlin Film Festival.

== Germany (1990–present) ==
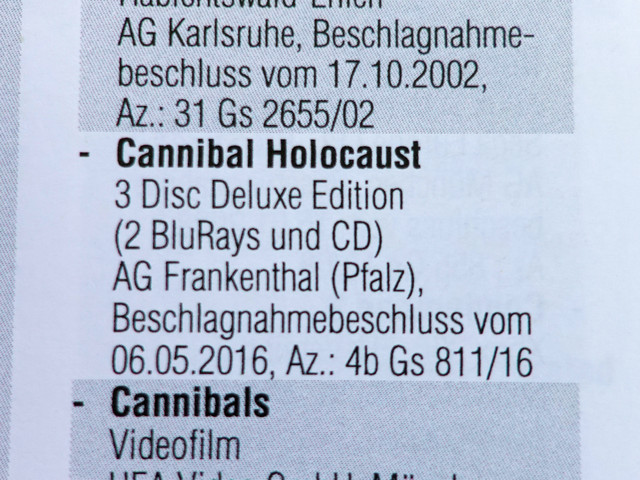
An exemplary entry of a movie in the list of confiscated media in the official magazine "BPjMaktuell" (today "BzKJaktuell").

In today's Germany, a film is considered banned if it has been confiscated by a court. The distribution of a confiscated film is prohibited, but private possession and viewing is still legal (with the exception of child and youth pornographic material, where possession is already a criminal offense).

The official list of confiscated films was published by the Federal Agency for Child and Youth Protection in the Media (Bundeszentrale für Kinder- und Jugendmedienschutz) in the magazine "BzKJaktuell" until the beginning of 2022.

The list of confiscated films should not be confused with films on the "List of Media Harmful to Young Persons" (colloquially known as the "Index"). Films indexed by the Federal Agency for Child and Youth Protection in the Media are subject to strict restrictions and may only be offered and sold to adults.

=== List of films confiscated for violating Criminal Code 131 (Depictions of violence) ===
==== List of films whose confiscation has not been lifted ====
Date (since)	Title	Notes
1985	Boogeyman II (1983)	The VHS release was put on the "List of Media Harmful to Young People" in October 1984. The Dortmund District Court confiscated the film in September 1985.
1986	The Bang Bang Gang (1970)	
1986	Don't Go in the Woods (1981)	
1986	Tian zhan (aka: Forced to Fight) (1971)	
1986	The Grapes of Death (1978)	
1986	Hospital Massacre (1982)	
1986	Lei ting chu chuan (aka: Magnum Thunderbolt) (1985)	
1986	The Living Dead Girl (1982)	
1986	Lost Souls (1980)	
1986	Star of David: Beautiful Girl Hunter (1979)	
1987	Absurd (1981)	
1987	The Burning (1981)	
1987	Cannibal Ferox (1981)	
1987	Cellat (aka: Turkish Death Wish) (1975)	
1987	The Ghost Galleon (1974)	
1987	Giallo a Venezia (1979)	
1987	Hot Spur (1968)	
1987	Mondo Cannibale (1980)	
1987	Slave of the Cannibal God (1978)	
1987	Toxic Zombies (1980)	
1988	Bare Behind Bars (1980)	
1988	Devil Hunter (1980)	
1988	Faccia di spia (1975)	
1988	Gecenin Sonu (1983)	
1988	İnsan Avcısı (1975)	
1988	The New York Ripper (1982)	
1988	Zindan (1974)	
1989	Blood Cult (1985)	
1989	Dev Kani (1984)	
1989	En Büyük Yumruk (1983)	
1989	Kin (1974)	
1989	Mask of Murder (1988)	
1989	Perawan di sarang sindikat (aka: Virgins from Hell) (1986)	
1989	The Prowler (1981)	
1989	The Slumber Party Massacre (1982)	
1989	Terror at Tenkiller (1987)	
1989	Vahşi Kan (1983)	
1990	The American Scream (1988)	
1990	Night Life (1989)	
1990	Pledge Night (1990)	
1990	Unmasked Part 25 (1988)	
1991	Double Exposure (1982)	
1991	Madhouse (1981)	
1991	Slaughterhouse Rock (1988)	
1992	Cobra (aka: Bruce Lei Intikam) (1981)	
1992	Faces of Death IV (1990)	
1992	Faces of Death V (1991)	
1993	The Best of Gesichter des Todes (1992)	
1993	The Burning Moon (1992)	
1993	Faces of Death VI (1996)	
1993	Kartalbey (1984)	
1993	Melek yüzlü cani (1986)	
1995	Tetsuo II: Body Hammer (1992)	
1996	Cyclops (1987)	
1996	Guinea Pig: Devil's Experiment (1985)	
1999	Braindead (1992)	The film was shown in German cinemas in an edited version. The uncut release was confiscated in 1999 for violating German Criminal Code Section 131 (depictions of violence). A heavily censored version is available in which around 12 minutes are missing.
2000	Cannibal Holocaust (1980)	
2000	Emanuelle and the Last Cannibals (1977)	
2000	Faces of Gore (1999)	
2000	Shogun's Sadism (1976)	
2002	Blood Sucking Freaks (1976)	
2002	Splatter University (1984)	
2002	Redneck Zombies (1987)	
2002	Zombi 3 (1988)	
2003	Burial Ground (1981)	
2004	Blood Feast (1963)	
2004	Riverplay (2000)	
2006	Jigoku: Japanese Hell (1999)	
2007	Das Komabrutale Duell (1999)	
2007	Mexican Werewolf in Texas (2005)	
2007	Olaf Ittenbach's Familienradgeber (2006)	
2008	Storm Warning (2007)	
2008	Voyeur.com (2000)	
2009	Inside (2007)	
2010	Android of Notre Dame (1988)	
2010	Devil Woman Doctor (1990)	
2010	Guinea Pig's Greatest Cuts (1991)	
2010	Sadisticum (2008)	
2010	Vengeance of the Zombies (1973)	
2011	Blood Feast 2: All U Can Eat (2002)	
2011	The Butcher (2007)	
2011	Harakiri (1990)	
2012	Fetus (2008)	
2012	I Spit on Your Grave (2010)	
2012	Isle of the Damned (2008)	
2012	The Orphan Killer (2011)	
2012	Train (2008)	
2013	Banned! in America (1998)	
2013	Banned! in America II (1998)	
2013	Banned! in America III (1999)	
2013	Banned! in America IV (1999)	
2013	Banned! in America V (2000)	
2013	Chiseled (aka: Saw Terror) (2006)	
2014	Borderland (2007)	
2014	Facez of Death 2000 (aka: America the Violent) (1996)	
2014	Facez of Death 2000: Part 3 (aka: The Amazing Shocking Asia) (1998)	
2014	Facez of Death 2000: Part 4 (2000)	
2014	Facez of Death 2000: Part 5 (2002)	
2014	Facez of Death 2000: Part 7 (2002)	
2014	Hobo with a Shotgun (2011)	
2014	The Human Centipede 2 (Full Sequence) (2011)	
2014	I Spit on Your Grave 2 (2013)	
2014	The Image (1975)	
2014	The Last House in the Woods (2006)	
2014	Man Hunting: Resurrection (2012)	
2015	The Human Centipede (First Sequence) (2009)	
2018	American Guinea Pig: Bouquet of Guts and Gore (2014)	
2018	Vomit Gore Trilogy (2006–2010)	
2021	Sturmgewehr (aka: Snuff Tape Massacre) (2019)	

==== List of films whose confiscation has been lifted ====
Date confiscated	Date lifted	Title	Notes
1983	2019	Maniac (1980)	The edited VHS release was put on the "List of Media Harmful to Young People" in March 1983. The Munich District Court confiscated the film in August 1983. Further confiscations followed over the years. In December 2019, the film was removed from the "List of Media Harmful to Young People" and received an 18+ rating from the FSK.
1984	2016	The Evil Dead (1981)	The VHS release was put on the "List of Media Harmful to Young People" in April 1984. The Munich District Court confiscated the film in July 1984. Further confiscations followed over the years. In October 2016, the film was removed from the "List of Media Harmful to Young People" and received a 16+ rating from the FSK.
1984	2021	Mother's Day (1980)	The VHS release was put on the "List of Media Harmful to Young People" in December 1982. The Munich District Court confiscated the film in September 1984. Further confiscations followed over the years. In March 2021, the film was removed from the "List of Media Harmful to Young People" and received an 18+ rating from the FSK.
1984	2024	Nightmare (1981)	The VHS release was put on the "List of Media Harmful to Young People" in April 1984. The Bielefeld District Court confiscated the film in May 1984. Further confiscations followed over the years. The confiscation was lifted in October 2024.
1985	2011	The Texas Chain Saw Massacre (1974)	The film was not shown in German cinemas before 1978 and even then only in an edited version. The release on VHS was confiscated by a German court in 1985 for violating German Criminal Code Section 131 (depictions of violence). The confiscation was lifted by the Frankfurt district court in 2011 and the film was subsequently re-released with an 18+ rating.
1985	2021	The Last House on the Beach (1978)	The VHS release was put on the "List of Media Harmful to Young People" in December 1983. The Frankfurt District Court confiscated the film in July 1985. In July 2017, the film was removed from the "List of Media Harmful to Young People" and re-released without a rating from the FSK.
1986	2018	Contraband (1980)	
1986	2022	Antropophagus (1980)	
1986	2022	Zombie Holocaust (1980)	
1986	2023	Bloody Moon (1981)	The edited VHS release was added to the "List of Media Harmful to Young People" in June 1983. The Pforzheim District Court confiscated the film in April 1986. Further confiscations followed over the years. In March 2023, the film was removed from the "List of Media Harmful to Young People" and received an 18+ rating from the FSK.
1986	2023	Eaten Alive! (1980)	
1986	2024	The Beyond (1981)	The confiscation was lifted in October 2024.
1986	2025	City of the Living Dead (1980)	The film has already been shown in the cinema in an edited version. Since its release on VHS, the film has been confiscated several times. The confiscation was lifted in January 2025.
1987	2020	I Spit on Your Grave (1978)	
1987	2022	Tenebrae (1982)	
1987	2023	A Bay of Blood (1971)	The confiscation was lifted in December 2022, and two months later received an 18+ rating from the FSK.
1987	2023	Beyond the Darkness (1979)	
1988	2016	Friday the 13th Part III (1982)	The confiscation was lifted in June 2016 and was later subsequently re-rated to 16+ from the FSK.
1988	2017	Friday the 13th: The Final Chapter (1984)	The confiscation was lifted in January 2017 and two months later the uncut version received an 18+ rating from the FSK.
1988	2023	Demons (1985)	
1989	2024	Night of the Demon (1980)	
1990	2016	The Texas Chainsaw Massacre 2 (1986)	
1990	2024	Don't Open till Christmas (1984)	
1990	2024	Halloween II (1981)	The confiscation was lifted in January 2024 and many days later the uncut version was granted a 16+ rating from the FSK.
1990	2026	Day of the Dead (1985)	
1990	2026	Rabid Grannies (1988)	
1991	2017	Phantasm (1979)	
1991	2019	Dawn of the Dead (1978)	
1991	2021	Drive-In Massacre (1976)	
1991	2022	Cut-Throats Nine (1972)	
1991	2023	Demon Wind (1990)	
1995	2020	Slaughterhouse (1987)	
1996	2020	Night of the Living Dead (1990)	
1996	2021	Nightmare City (1980)	
1996	2023	Zombi 2 (1979)	
1997	2007	Submissive Geishas (unknown)	
1999	2022	Riki-Oh: The Story of Ricky (1991)	
2000	2016	Mark of the Devil (1970)	
2000	2017	The Last House on the Left (1972)	
2000	2020	Night of the Living Dead (1968)	The Berlin Tiergarten District Court had confused the 30th Anniversary version with the remake by Tom Savini and classified it as having the same content and confiscated it. It was not until 2020 that this version was removed from the list of media harmful to minors when the confiscation of the remake was lifted.
2000	2021	Cat in the Brain (1990)	
2000	2023	Hell of the Living Dead (1980)	
2000	2024	Let Sleeping Corpses Lie (1974)	The edited VHS release was put on the "List of Media Harmful to Young People" in January 1983. The Wolfhagen District Court confiscated the film in July 2000. Further confiscations followed over the years. In September 2024, the film was removed from the "List of Media Harmful to Young People".
2002	2020	The Dead Next Door (1989)	
2007	2026	Ichi the Killer (2001)	The DVD release was put on the "List of Media Harmful to Young People" in December 2005. The Neuburg an der Donau District Court confiscated the film in May 2008. The confiscation was lifted in 2026, but the uncut version remains on the List of Media Harmful to Young People and may only be offered to adults.
2008	2021	Hostel: Part II (2007)	
2010	2024	The Dentist (1996)	The confiscation was lifted in October 2024 and received a 16+ rating from the FSK days later. The confiscation was lifted in October 2024.
2012	2013	Saw 3D (2010)	The film was shown in German cinemas in the uncut version. The uncut DVD release was confiscated in 2012 by the district court of Berlin Tiergarten for violating German Criminal Code Section 131 (depictions of violence). A censored version with a "Keine Jugendfreigabe"-rating (No youth admitted) is available with around one minute missing. The confiscation was lifted in 2013, but the uncut version remains on the list of media harmful to minors and may only be offered to adults.
2013	2013	Battle Royale (2000)	
2013	2014	The Horde (2009)	
2015	2020	Maniac (2012)	
2018	2025	Wrong Turn 5: Bloodlines (2012)	

=== List of films conficated for violating Criminal Code sections on pornography ===
Date	Title	Notes	Criminal Code section violated
Since 2007	Cannibal (2006)		Section 184a (Dissemination of pornographic content depicting violent acts or sexual acts with animals)
Since 1986	A Dirty Western (1975)		Section 184 (Dissemination of pornographic content)
Since 1990	Debbie Does Dallas (1978)		Section 184 (Dissemination of pornographic content)
Since 2006	Maladolescenza (1977)		Section 184b (Child pornographic content)
Since 2016	Love Strange Love (1982)		Section 184b (Child pornographic content)

=== List of films reserved by the Friedrich Wilhelm Murnau Foundation (since 1966) ===
Special provisions apply to the propaganda films that were classified as banned films by the Allies in 1945. These include films that contain a clearly racist, anti-Semitic, inciting or war-glorifying message. Since 1966, the former banned films have been in the collection of the Friedrich Wilhelm Murnau Foundation. These films, which are now known as reserved films, are not released for general distribution, but are available for viewing at any time, on the Foundation's premises, for educational, scientific and production purposes.

- Alarm in Peking (1937)
- Anschlag auf Baku (1942)
- Besatzung Dora (1943)
- Blutsbrüderschaft (1940)
- Carl Peters (1941)
- D III 88 (1939)
- Das Leben geht weiter (1945)
- Der 5. Juni (1942)
- Der Herrscher (1937)
- Der Stammbaum des Dr. Pistorius (1939)
- Die Rothschilds (1940)
- Drei Unteroffiziere (1939)
- Falschmünzer (1940)
- Feinde (1940)
- Flucht ins Dunkel (1939)
- Fronttheater (1942)
- G.P.U. (1942)
- Himmelhunde (1942)
- Himmelstürmer (1941)
- Hitlerjunge Quex (1933)
- Ich klage an (1941)
- Im Kampf gegen den Weltfeind (1939)
- Jakko (1941)
- Jud Süß (1940)
- Jungens (1941)
- Kadetten (1941)
- Kameraden auf See (1938)
- Kampfgeschwader Lützow (1941)
- Kolberg (1945)
- Kopf hoch, Johannes! (1941)
- Legion Condor (1939)
- Mein Sohn, der Herr Minister (1937)
- Ohm Krüger (1941)
- Pour le Mérite (1938)
- Ritt in die Freiheit (1936)
- Robert und Bertram (1939)
- Stukas (1941)
- Togger (1937)
- U-Boote westwärts! (1941)
- Über alles in der Welt (1941)
- Unternehmen Michael (1937)
- Venus vor Gericht (1941)
- Volldampf voraus (1933)
- Wir seh’n uns wieder (1945)
