= List of German films of 1941 =

This is a list of the most notable films produced in the Cinema of Germany in 1941.

== A–L ==
Title	Director	Cast	Genre	Notes
Above All Else in the World	Karl Ritter	Paul Hartmann, Hannes Stelzer, Carl Raddatz	Drama	
Alarm	Herbert B. Fredersdorf	Karl Martell, Maria von Tasnady, Hilde Sessak	Crime	
Annelie	Josef von Báky	Luise Ullrich, Werner Krauss, Käthe Haack	Drama	
Battle Squadron Lützow	Hans Bertram	Christian Kayßler, Hermann Braun, Heinz Welzel	War	
Carl Peters	Herbert Selpin	Hans Albers, Karl Dannemann, Fritz Odemar	Adventure	
Clarissa	Gerhard Lamprecht	Sybille Schmitz, Gustav Fröhlich, Gustav Diessl	Romance	
The Comedians	Georg Wilhelm Pabst	Hilde Krahl, Henny Porten, Gustav Diessl	Drama	
Comrades	Hans Schweikart	Willy Birgel, Martin Urtel, Karin Hardt	Historical	
Everything for Gloria	Carl Boese	Leo Slezak, Laura Solari, Johannes Riemann	Romance	
Friedemann Bach	Traugott Müller	Gustaf Gründgens, Eugen Klöpfer, Leny Marenbach	Biopic	
The Gasman	Carl Froelich	Heinz Rühmann, Anny Ondra, Charlotte Susa	Comedy	
Goodbye, Franziska	Helmut Käutner	Marianne Hoppe, Hans Söhnker, Fritz Odemar	Romance	.
Happiness Is the Main Thing	Theo Lingen	Heinz Rühmann, Hertha Feiler, Ida Wüst	Comedy	
Her Other Self	Wolfgang Liebeneiner	Hilde Krahl, Mathias Wieman, Harald Paulsen	Drama	
Ich klage an	Wolfgang Liebeneiner	Heidemarie Hatheyer, Paul Hartmann, Mathias Wieman	Drama	
Immer nur Du	Karl Anton	Johannes Heesters	Musical romantic comedy	Only Ever You
Jakko	Fritz Peter Buch	Norbert Rohringer, Eugen Klöpfer, Aribert Wäscher	Drama	
Jenny und der Herr im Frack	Paul Martin	Johannes Heesters, Gusti Huber	Criminal comedy	Jenny and the Gentleman in Coattails; features brief nudity; involves philately (stamp collecting)
Kleine Mädchen-große Sorgen	Boleslaw Barlog	Hannelore Schroth, Geraldine Katt, Hermann Braun, Inge Burg, Dagny Servaes, Eva Prawitz, Fritz Odemar, Carsta Löck, Hans Brausewetter, and Roma Bahn	Comedy?	Little Girl—Very Worried One of the last films made by Hermann Braun (1918-1945) prior to being drafted and killed in combat.
LAH Im Einsatz				LAH in Action; 39-minute propaganda film about 1st SS Division Leibstandarte SS Adolf Hitler
Lightning Around Barbara	Werner Klingler	Sybille Schmitz, Attila Hörbiger, Maria Koppenhöfer	Drama	
Love Is Duty Free	E.W. Emo	Hans Moser	Comedy	Liebe ist zollfrei

== M–Z ==
Title	Director	Cast	Genre	Notes
Mamma	Guido Brignone	Beniamino Gigli		Mother; German-Italian co-production
Mistress Moon	Theo Lingen	Lizzi Waldmüller, Fita Benkhoff, Irene von Meyendorff	Musical comedy	
My Life for Ireland	Max W. Kimmich	Will Quadflieg, René Deltgen, Anna Dammann, Paul Wegener		Mein Leben für Irland; dramatic anti-British propaganda film
Ohm Krüger	Hans Steinhoff	Emil Jannings, Gustaf Gründgens, Ferdinand Marian		about Paul Kruger, the South African leader in the Boer War; anti-British propaganda
Pedro Will Hang	Veit Harlan	Gustav Knuth, Heinrich George	Adventure	
People in the Storm	Fritz Peter Buch	Olga Tschechowa, Gustav Diessl, Hannelore Schroth, Siegfried Breuer	Drama	
Quax the Crash Pilot	Kurt Hoffmann	Heinz Rühmann, Karin Himboldt	Comedy	pro-Luftwaffe and anti-individualist film with propaganda tendencies
Riding for Germany	Arthur Maria Rabenalt	Willy Birgel	Sport	...reitet für Deutschland; blacklisted film; director banned for 2 years by the Americans for this film about a tournament runner with blatant patriotic and nationalistic undertones.
Six Days of Leave	Jürgen von Alten	Gustav Fröhlich, Maria Andergast, Hilde Sessak, Günther Lüders	Romance	
Spähtrupp Hallgarten	Herbert B. Fredersdorf	René Deltgen, Paul Klinger, Maria Andergast	War	Hallgarten Patrol; soldier's death propaganda.
Stukas	Karl Ritter	Carl Raddatz, Hannes Stelzer	War	pro-Luftwaffe propaganda film; "Stuka" was the slang term for the Junkers Ju 87 dive bomber
The Swedish Nightingale	Peter Paul Brauer	Ilse Werner, Karl Ludwig Diehl, Joachim Gottschalk	Musical	
Thrice Wed	Géza von Bolváry	Willy Fritsch, Marte Harell, Theo Lingen	Comedy	
U-Boote westwärts!	Günther Rittau	Herbert Wilk, Heinz Engelmann, Joachim Brennecke, Ernst Wilhelm Borchert, Karl John, Clemens Hasse, Ilse Werner, Admiral Karl Dönitz as himself	Kriegsmarine recruiting and anti-British propaganda film	U-boats Westward; about U-boats in the Battle of the Atlantic
Venus on Trial	Hans H. Zerlett	Hannes Stelzer, Hansi Knoteck	Drama	
Vertigine	Guido Brignone	Beniamino Gigli		Tragödie einer Liebe; Broken Love; German-Italian co-production
The Waitress Anna	Peter Paul Brauer	Franziska Kinz, Elfriede Datzig, Winnie Markus	Drama	
The Way to Freedom	Rolf Hansen	Zarah Leander, Hans Stüwe, Siegfried Breuer	Historical drama	
What Does Brigitte Want?	Paul Martin	Leny Marenbach, Albert Matterstock	Comedy	
Women Are Better Diplomats	Georg Jacoby	Marika Rökk, Willy Fritsch		Frauen sind doch bessere Diplomaten; in Agfacolor

== Documentaries ==
Title	Director	Cast	Genre	Notes
Auf Ostkurs			documentary	
Bauten im neuen Deutschland	C.A. Engel		documentary	
Bunte Kriechtierwelt	Wolfram Junghans			The Colorful World of Animals that Crawl; nature documentary; in Agfacolor
Die Englische Krankheit	Kurt Stefan		documentary	The Sickness of Being English; anti-British propaganda film
Fliegende Früchte - Wie die Natur pflanzt und sät	Kurt Stefan		documentary	
Himmelstürmer. Geburt und Geschichte des Fliegens	Walter Jerven			
Ins Grab kann man nichts mitnehmen	Wolfgang Staudte		documentary	
Ins Grab kann man nichts mitnehmen	Wolfgang Staudte		documentary	
Leuchtendes Hellas	Hans Bröcker		documentary	
Mooswunder	Ulrich K.T. Schultz		Documentary	
Der Neusiedler See	Ulrich K.T. Schultz		documentary	
Sieg im Westen	Svend Noldan			Victory in the West; documentary/propaganda film about Blitzkrieg in Western Europe
Sonnige Saar	Curt A. Engel		documentary	
The Soviet Paradise				Sowjetparadies, 14-minute anti-Soviet documentary propaganda film
Thüringen, das grüne Herz Deutschlands	J.C. Hartmann		documentary	
Vom Werden der Kristalle	Ulrich K.T. Schultz		Documentary	
Wisente	Ulrich K.T. Schultz		Documentary	
Zeitgemäße Pflanzenzucht	Ulrich K.T. Schultz		Documentary	

== Short films ==
Title	Director	Cast	Genre	Notes
5-Pfennig-Serenade	Hans Fischerkoesen		animation	
Frühling in Japan	Arnold Fanck (unconfirmed)		Short	
Japans heiliger Vulkan	Arnold Fanck (unconfirmed)		Short	
Kampf um den Berg - Eine Hochtour vor 20 Jahren	Arnold Fanck		Short	
