= The Cruise of the Chelyuskin =

1930s radio play

The Cruise of the Chelyuskin is a 1930s radio play by Gordon Ireland. It told the story of the Polish ship SS Chelyuskin, which was travelling in the Arctic and became ice bound. The crew had to be rescued by flying boat.

The play was written for Belgian radio.

The play was written in English but as of 1945 had not been performed in English. However it was broadcast from Brussels in two languages, French and Flemish.

It was one of a number of popular "adventure" radio dramas by Ireland based on true life events, others including Storm Over Everest and Wings Over Westralia.
