= Otto Graf =

German actor

- Born: 28 November 1896; Haina, German Empire
- Died: 22 February 1977 (aged 80); West Berlin, West Germany
- Occupation: Actor
- Years active: 1935–1970

Otto Graf (28 November 1896 – 22 February 1977) was a German actor. He appeared in more than 50 films and television shows between 1935 and 1970.

== Partial filmography ==
- Nacht der Verwandlung (1935) as René Duval
- The Traitor (1936) as Capitain Dressler (uncredited)
- Capers (1937) as Zahnarzt
- Unternehmen Michael (1937) as Capitain Von Grauff
- Die Fledermaus (1937) as Rundfunkreporter
- Urlaub auf Ehrenwort (1938) as Professor Knudsen
- Liebesbriefe aus dem Engadin (1938)
- Pour le Mérite (1938) as the capitain-lieutenant
- Salonwagen E 417 (1939) as Rittmeister Graf Grenzberg
- Robert Koch (1939) as Dr. Friedrich Löffler
- Legion Condor (1939)
- Angelika (1940) as Prof. Fritz v. Deubertz
- Bismarck (1940) as Robert Von Keudell
- Ohm Krüger (1941) as the German foreign minister
- Krach im Vorderhaus (1941) (uncredited)
- Ich klage an (1941) as Prosecutor Engel
- Was geschah in dieser Nacht (1941) as Von Barlay
- The Great King (1942) as Friedrich Wilhelm von Seydlitz
- Andreas Schlüter (1942) as Count Flemming
- Die Entlassung (1942) as Count Eulenburg
- My Wife Theresa (1942) as Dr.Grothe
- Back Then (1943) as Dr. Lugeon
- Die Wirtin zum Weißen Röß'l (1943) as Heinz Marius
- Melody of a Great City (1943) as Dr. Werner
- Harald Arrives at Nine (1944) as Staatsanwalt
- Der große Preis (1944) as Verteidiger
- Der Engel mit dem Saitenspiel (1944) as Dr. Thomas Weinzierl
- The Man in the Saddle (1945) as Fritz Thermälen
- Beate (1948) as Dr. Schenk, Rechtsanwalt
- Nur eine Nacht (1950)
- Canaris (1954)
- Devil in Silk (1956) as the chief judge
- Beichtgeheimnis (1956) as Bischof
- The Story of Anastasia (1956) as the Duke of Leuchtenberg
- Different from You and Me (1957) as the chief justice
- The Last Witness (1960) as Dr. Beyer
- The Marriage of Mr. Mississippi (1961) as the minister president
- Der Prozeß Carl von O. (1964) as Ministerialdirektor
- Der junge Lord (1969) as Sir Edgar
- Dr. Fabian: Laughing Is the Best Medicine (1969) as Consul Lürsen
- Gentlemen in White Vests (1970)
