= Heinz Welzel =

German actor

- Born: 30 May 1911; Berlin, German Empire
- Died: 26 March 2002 (aged 90); Berlin, Germany
- Occupation: Actor
- Years active: 1932-1968 (film)

Heinz Welzel (1911–2002) was a German stage, television and film actor. He was also a noted voice actor, dubbing foreign films for German-speaking audiences. He played one of the lead roles in the popular 1939 aviation film D III 88.

== Filmography ==
Year	Title	Role	Notes
1932	Mieter Schulze gegen alle		
1936	The Traitor	Hans Klemm	
1937	Unternehmen Michael	Lt. v. Tresckow	
1938	Urlaub auf Ehrenwort	Rekrut Gustav Jahnke	
1938	Revolutionary Wedding	Jean Lasque	
1938	You and I	Otz Uhlig	
1938	The Four Companions	Feinmechaniker Martin Bachmann	
1938	Pour le Mérite	Lt. Rombert	
1939	Uproar in Damascus	Soldat Schulz	
1939	Man for Man	Werner Handrup	
1939	D III 88	Obergefreiter Fritz Paulsen	
1939	Legion Condor		
1940	Friedrich Schiller – The Triumph of a Genius	Andreas Streicher	
1941	Battle Squadron Lützow	Unteroffizier Paulsen	
1941	Above All Else in the World		
1941	People in the Storm	Hans Neubert Lehrer	
1942	The Old Boss	Robert von Schulte	
1943	Love Premiere	Rolf, Lawyer	
1943	Titanic	2. Funker Bride	Uncredited
1944	Ein schöner Tag		
1947	Raid	Heinz Becker, Kriminal-Anwärter	
1954	The Perfect Couple		
1961	Blind Justice	Dr. Biermann	
1968	The Valley of Death	Richter	(final film role)

== Bibliography ==
- Paris, Michael. From the Wright Brothers to Top Gun: Aviation, Nationalism, and Popular Cinema. Manchester University Press, 1995.
