= Franz Schafheitlin =

German actor (1895–1980)

- Born: 9 August 1895; Charlottenburg, Berlin, Kingdom of Prussia, German Empire
- Died: 6 February 1980 (aged 84); Pullach, Bavaria, West Germany
- Occupation: Actor
- Years active: 1927–1974

Franz Schafheitlin (9 August 1895 – 6 February 1980) was a German film actor. He appeared in more than 160 films between 1927 and 1974. He was born in Charlottenburg, Berlin, Germany and died in Pullach, West Germany.

== Selected filmography ==
- The Bordellos of Algiers (1927)
- Mariett Dances Today (1928)
- The Wonderful Lies of Nina Petrovna (1929)
- Napoleon at Saint Helena (1929)
- Money on the Street (1930) as Bornhausen
- Storm in a Water Glass (1931) as Prosecutor
- The Ringer (1932) as Sergeant Carter
- Daughter of the Regiment (1933) as Major
- Sonnenstrahl (1933) as Ein Arzt im Unfallkrankenhaus
- Frasquita (1934) as Juan
- The Secret of Cavelli (1934)
- Asew (1935) as Urzoff
- The Cossack and the Nightingale (1935) as R12
- Eva (1935) as Stefan, ein Arbeiter
- The Eternal Mask (1935) as Monsieur Negar
- Leutnant Bobby, der Teufelskerl (1935)
- ...nur ein Komödiant (1935) as Blanchet, court painter
- Die Pompadour (1935) as Graf Aragnac
- Augustus the Strong (1936) as Flemming
- Singende Jugend as Brunner, Präfekt
- Die Puppenfee (1936)
- The Cabbie's Song (1936) as Max Jolander
- Ball at the Metropol (1937) as Steltendorff
- IA in Oberbayern (1937) as Dr. Hans Hemann, Rechtsanwalt
- Another World (1937) as Dr. Herbert Carter
- Anna Favetti (1938) as Dr. Thom
- Heimat (1938) as Bank Director von Keller
- Steputat & Co. (1938) as Staatsanwalt
- So You Don't Know Korff Yet? (1938) as Morton
- The Immortal Heart (1939) as Squire Zinderl
- The Green Emperor (1939) as the procuror n°2
- The Fourth Is Not Coming (1939) as Richter Tilenius
- Marguerite : 3 (1939) as Dr. Ludwig Findeisen
- Dein Leben gehört mir (1939)
- The Desert Song (1939) as Finanzier
- Maria Ilona (1939) as Captain von Sailern
- Der singende Tor (1939) as Staatsanwalt
- Angelika (1940) as Immerzeel jun.
- Die lustigen Vagabunden (1940) as Dr. Klamm, Kunstkritiker
- Kora Terry (1940) as Vopescu
- Bismarck (1940) as Fürst Metternich
- My Life for Ireland (1941) as Harrison
- Ohm Kruger (1941) as Lord Kitchener
- Friedemann Bach (1941) as Secretary Siepmann (uncredited)
- Ich klage an (1941) as Rechtsanwalt Straten
- People in the Storm (1941) as Kommisar Subotic
- The Thing About Styx (1942)
- Die heimlichen Bräute (1942) as Oberstaatsanwalt Dr. Burgmeier
- A Gust of Wind (1942) as the chief judge
- Rembrandt (1942)
- Andreas Schlüter (1942) as Mr. von Harms
- Die Entlassung (1942) as Botschafter Graf Schuwalow
- Voice of the Heart (1942) as Direktor Möller
- With the Eyes of a Woman (1942) as Baron von Stein
- Liebesgeschichten (1943) as Herr Rechenmacher
- Münchhausen (1943) as Doge (uncredited)
- Paracelsus (1943) as Erasmus von Rotterdam
- Fahrt ins Abenteuer (1943) as Verleger Helmut Burke
- Titanic (1943) as Hunderson
- Die beiden Schwestern (1943) as Opernindendant
- Gefährlicher Frühling (1943) as Arthur Friedeborn
- Herr Sanders lebt gefährlich (1944) as Romberg, Regierungsrat
- Der große Preis (1944) as Greininger
- The Roedern Affair (1944) as Marquis d'Orion
- Ich habe von dir geträumt (1944) as Helenes Vater
- The Black Robe (1944) as Dr. Lindener
- Opfergang (1944) as Matthias
- That Was My Life (1944) as Baron Schark
- Philharmonic (1944) as Ministerialrat
- Kolberg (1945) as Fanselow
- The Years Pass (1945) as Judicial Counsellor Carlsen
- Meine Herren Söhne (1945) as Ministerialdirektor
- Eines Tages (1945) as Dr. Wegner
- Der Erbförster (1945)
- Das Leben geht weiter (1945)
- In Those Days (1947) as Wolfgang Buschenhagen
- Finale (1948) as Professor Grammann
- Insolent and in Love (1948) as Justus Pernrieder, Fabrikant
- The Last Night (1949) as Administration Counsellor Borner
- Verführte Hände (1949) as Dr. Beermann
- Die Andere (1949) as Prof. Eckbert Litten
- Trouble Backstairs (1949) as Procuror
- Kätchen für alles (1949) as Professor Gerlach
- How Do We Tell Our Children? (1949)
- Dangerous Guests (1949) as Dr. Roeder
- Shadows in the Night (1950)
- One Night Apart (1950) as Burgomaster
- Thirteen Under One Hat (1950) as Eddi Winterthur
- Gabriela (1950) as Hausherr
- Blondes for Export (1950) as Polizeikommissar (Rio)
- The Beautiful Galatea (1950)
- Abundance of Life (1950) as Professor
- Mathilde Möhring (1950)
- Harbour Melody (1950) as Arzt
- The Wooden Horse (1950) as Camp Commandant
- The Rabanser Case (1950) as Polizeirat
- The Girl from the South Seas (1950)
- Melody of Fate (1950) as Hugo Müller
- Immortal Beloved (1951) as Talma
- Professor Nachtfalter (1951)
- Das fremde Leben (1951) as Herr Barkhausen
- Dr. Holl (1951) as Professor Godenbergh
- The Guilt of Doctor Homma (1951) as Landgerichtsdirektor von Herkenrath
- Grün ist die Heide (1951) (uncredited)
- The Lady in Black (1951) as Chief Inspector Marshall
- The Csardas Princess (1951) as Leopold von Weylersheim
- Hanna Amon (1951) as Prison Director (uncredited)
- A Heidelberg Romance (1951) as Bellboy
- The Great Temptation (1952) as Landrat Rochwald
- We'll Talk About Love Later (1953) as Juwelier Penzner
- Secretly Still and Quiet (1953)
- Everything for Father (1953) as Betriebsdirektor
- The Country Schoolmaster (1954) as Senator Vanlos
- Regina Amstetten (1954) as Hotelportier Mohr
- Sanatorium total verrückt (1954)
- Confession Under Four Eyes (1954) as Chef Director Dr. Kopp
- Ingrid – Die Geschichte eines Fotomodells (1955) as Ingrids Onkel
- Music, Music and Only Music (1955) as Berndorff
- The Priest from Kirchfeld (1955) as Oberstaatsanwalt
- Your Life Guards (1955) as Flügeladjutant
- My Brother Joshua (1956) as Der Bürgermeister
- As Long as the Roses Bloom (1956) as Kunsthändler
- Es wird alles wieder gut (1957) as Dr. Berger, Fernsehintendant
- All Roads Lead Home (1957) as Grumke
- Greetings and Kisses from Tegernsee (1957) as Büroleiter
- Night Nurse Ingeborg (1958) as Oberarzt Dr. Ranzau
- Schmutziger Engel (1958) as Untersuchungsrichter Wangen
- Grabenplatz 17 (1958) as Dr. Bühler
- Vater, Mutter und neun Kinder (1958)
- Die schöne Lügnerin (1959) as British Ambassador Lord Stewart (uncredited)
- The Forests Sing Forever (1959) as Shopkeeper Holder
- The Inheritance of Bjorndal (1960) as Shopkeeper Holder
- Lysistrata (1961) as Dr. Kienast
- The Dead Eyes of London (1961) as Sir John
- Soft Shoulders, Sharp Curves (1972) as Opa Eugen
- Was wissen Sie von Titipu? (1972) as Mikado
- The Twins from Immenhof (1973) as Dr. Tiedemann, Tierarzt
- Zwei im 7. Himmel (1974) as Theo Sommer
- Spring in Immenhof (1974) as Dr. Tiedemann
