= Malte Jaeger =

Nazi German actor (1911–1991)

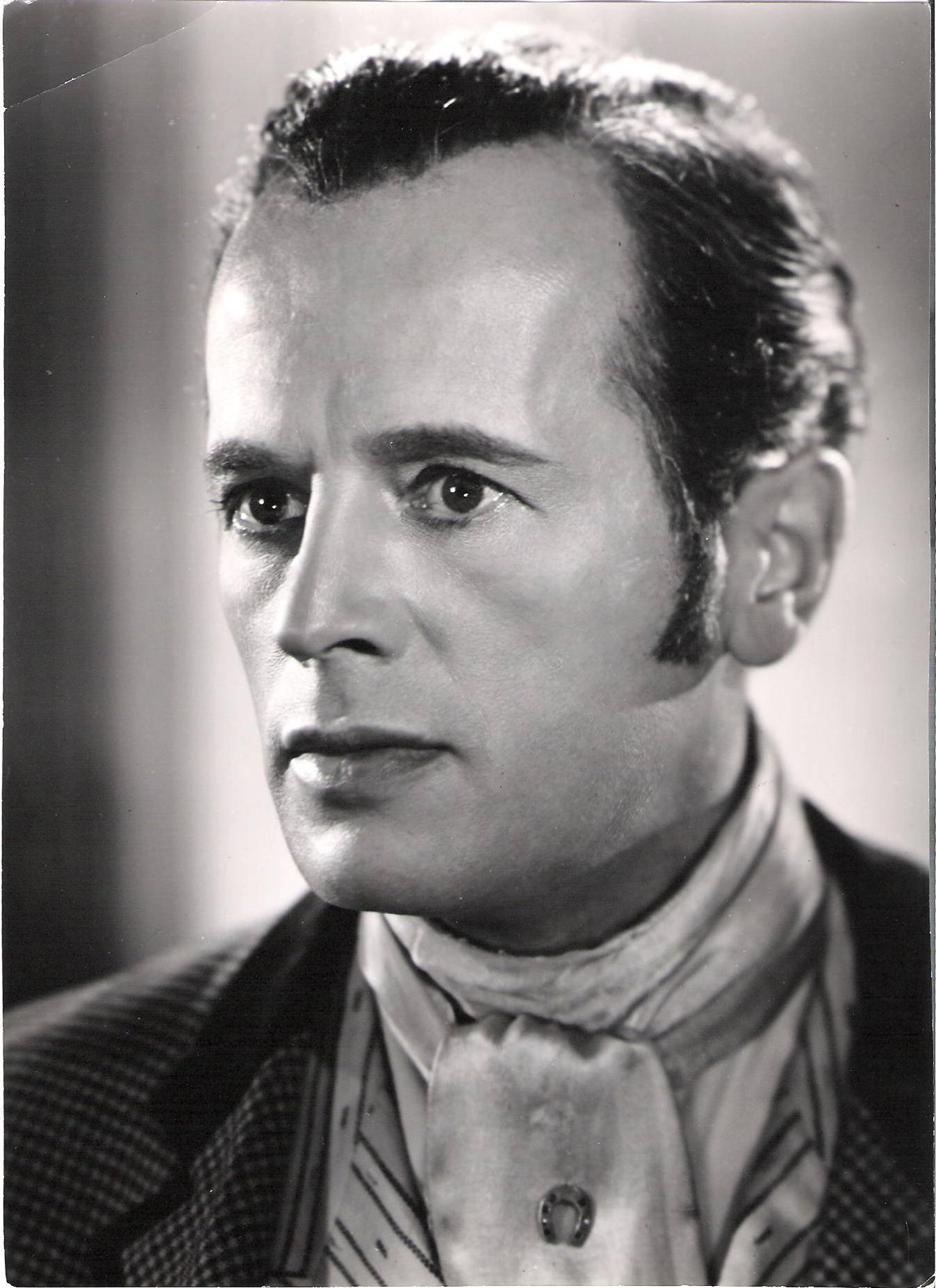
Malte Jäger in 1955

Malte Richard Friedrich Jaeger (sometimes named in cast lists as Malte Jäger; 4 July 1911 – 10 January 1991) was a German actor and theatre director.

== Early life ==
Malte Jaeger was the youngest of three children, son of the newspaper publisher Malte Heinrich Gustav Jaeger and his second Metta wife Christine, née Mueller. In 1912, the family moved from Hanover to Hamburg-Altona to, Oelckersallee No. 1. After graduation, Jaeger completed an apprenticeship as a wholesale merchant and attended an acting school. Before starting his acting career, he spent some time working as a journalist, as he already received his first broadcast in 1927 obligation.

== Acting career ==
In 1937, he was engaged at the North-Land Mark Theater in Schleswig, where he made his debut in Ferdinand's tragedy Egmont, by Johann Wolfgang von Goethe. His first production was just there the detective unit 13 Park Street by Axel Ivers. In 1939 he went to 1945 at the State Theater in Berlin. His work in television began in 1939/40 when trying Sender Berlin Hanns driving under castle as a speaker and commentator. In subsequent years, he made a numerous guest appearances in Bremen, Munich, Berlin and Stuttgart. During this time, while he relocated to Bad Wiessee. In 1952 he returned to Berlin and worked at the Theater am Kurfürstendamm. Aside from acting, he also appeared frequently as a director in appearance. Among his roles at the time include:

- Martinius in Cherries for Rome by Hans Hömberg (1940),
- Don Caesar in A dispute in Habsburg, by Franz Grillparzer (1942),
- Ladvenu in Saint Joan by George Bernard Shaw (1943),
- Teacher Gottwald in Hanneles Himmelfahrt' by Gerhart Hauptmann.

In 1934, he made his film debut, taking on a small role in the feature film The small relatives directed by Hans Deppe. He had to wait three years before getting his next role, mediated by Mathias Wieman. In the film Unternehmen Michael, he played a company commander. The film was directed by Karl Ritter, who was a master of "covert propaganda film". Ritter made two more movies with Jaeger, Pour le Mérite and Legion Condor.

Jaeger played the role of the actuary Faber in the notorious Nazi antisemitic propaganda film Jud Süß (1940) which was directed by Veit Harlan. In most movies, which of course also included entertainment films, he played supporting roles. He played the Aryan hero in this infamous movie, which in English was entitled Jew Süss.

He also had a major role as Hans Schonath in Philharmonic (1944).

Between 1945 and the mid-1950s, he had no work. His first appearance in film after the war was in 1948 in the movie Via Mala. This movie was filmed in 1944, but was not released until four years later.

He also resumed performing on radio (more than 2000 performances) and starting in 1956 he performed on television. There, he played alongside George Lehn starred in the television play Twelve thousand. He was a key player alongside Paul Edwin Roth in The Man Outside by Wolfgang Borchert. In 1960 he starred in the successful TV miniseries Am grünen Strand der Spree, based on the book by Hans Scholz, In 1967, he played Hans-Joachim Lepsius, one of the main characters in The Reichstag fire trial or in Sand in 1971. He was also in several TV series such as occurred in Die fünfte Kolonne, Timm Thaler, Schwarz Rot Gold and Das Erbe der Guldenburgs. As a voice actor, he was dubbed over Montgomery Clift in A Place in the Sun and Guy Decomble in Can't anyone love you...?.

== Personal life ==
In 1949, Jaeger married Elisabeth Susanne Jaeger, née von Ingersleben. In the early sixties, he met his future life partner, Elly Philomena Mary Wolf, with whom he cohabited for 30 years until his death on 10 January 1991. The cause of his death was an embolism.

== Selected filmography ==
- Unternehmen Michael (1937) as the 2nd Company commander
- Pour le Mérite (1938) as Lieutenant Overbeck
- Legion Condor (1939)
- Target in the Clouds (1939) as the officer
- D III 88 (1939) as the first radio operator
- Congo Express (1939) as Pierre Dufour
- A German Robinson Crusoe (1940) as the officer
- Jud Süss (1940) as Karl Faber
- Sky Hounds (1942) as Senior Troop Leader Killian
- Immensee (1943) as Jochen
- The Dark Day (1943) as Dieter von Weymar
- Philharmonic (1944) as Hans Schonath
- Via Mala (1945) as Nikolaus
- The Blue Star of the South (1951) as Marcel
- Daybreak (1954)
- Roses from the South (1954) as the Chief of protocol
- The Man of My Life (1954) as Dr. Reynold
- Jackboot Mutiny (1955)
- I'll Carry You in My Arms (1958) as the train clergyman
- Am grünen Strand der Spree (1960) as Hans-Joachim Lepsius
- Die fünfte Kolonne (1964) (TV series)
- Schwarz-Rot-Gold (1982) (TV series)
- Das Erbe der Guldenburgs (1987-1990) (TV series)
