= Reifender Sommer =

1959 film

- Directed by: Horst Reinecke
- Starring: Gisela Uhlen
- Release date: 1959
- Country: East Germany
- Language: German

Reifender Sommer is an East German film. It was released in 1959.
