= Werner Hinz =

German actor (1903–1985)

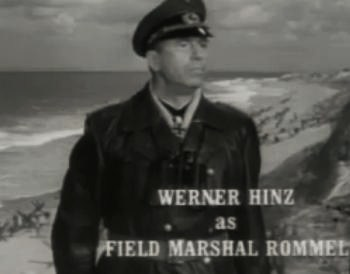
- Hinz in The Longest Day (1962)
- Born: 18 January 1903; Berlin, German Empire
- Died: 10 February 1985 (aged 82); Hamburg, West Germany
- Occupation: Actor
- Years active: 1935–1984

Werner Hinz (18 January 1903 – 10 February 1985) was a German film actor who appeared in 70 films between 1935 and 1984.

In 1944, he was included on the Gottbegnadeten list created by Josef Goebbels. Between 1935 and 1945 he had roles in 17 films that were mostly praised by Goebbels.

== Selected filmography ==
- The Old and the Young King (1935) - Kronprinz Friedrich ('Fritz')
- White Slaves (1937) - Boris - Diener beim Gouverneur
- The Citadel of Warsaw (1937) - Konrad
- Youth (1938) - Kaplan von Schigorski
- The Fourth Is Not Coming (1939) - Kapitän Holm
- The Fox of Glenarvon (1940) - Sir Tetbury
- Traummusik (194) - Ronny
- Bismarck (1940) - Kronprinz Friedrich
- My Life for Ireland (1941) - Michael O'Brien sen
- Ohm Krüger (1941) - Jan Krüger
- Destiny (1942) - Kosta Wasileff
- Die Entlassung (1942) - Kaiser Wilhelm II.
- Melody of a Great City (1943) - Dr. Rolf Bergmann, Berichterstatter
- Wild Bird (1943) - Professor Losse
- The Heart Must Be Silent (1944) - Freiherr von Bonin
- Meine Herren Söhne (1945) - Kurt Redwitz, Gutsbesitzer
- Der Fall Molander (1945) - Holk, Prosecutor
- In Those Days (1947) - Steffen / 1. Geschichte
- Martina (1949) - Professor Rauscher
- Girls in Gingham (1949) - Paul Schmiedecke
- The Appeal to Conscience (1945/1949) - Volkmar Hollberg, Schrifsteller
- The Beaver Coat (1949) - Friedrich von Wehrhahn
- The Guilt of Doctor Homma (1951) - Dr. Magnus Homma
- No Greater Love (1952) - Basil Zaharoff
- Confession Under Four Eyes (1954) - Jorga
- Fireworks (1954) - Albert
- The Last Summer (1954) - Der Innenminister
- Beloved Enemy (1955) - Gerald Gore, Englisher Konsul
- The Plot to Assassinate Hitler (1955) - Generaloberst Ludwig Beck
- Hotel Adlon (1955) - Lorenz Adlon
- You Can No Longer Remain Silent (1955) - Samuelsen
- Nina (1956) - Oberst Kapulowski
- Made in Germany (1957) - Carl Zeiss
- Confessions of Felix Krull (1957) - Stabsarzt
- Heart Without Mercy (1958) - Friedrich Rombach
- The Girl from the Marsh Croft (1958) - Vater Erlandsson
- Restless Night (1958) - Oberleutnant Ernst
- The Blue Moth (1959) - Steve Owens
- The Black Chapel (1959) - Generaloberst
- The Buddenbrooks (1959) - Jean Buddenbrook
- The Last Witness (1960) - Landgerichtsrat Ricker
- Die Stunde, die du glücklich bist (1961) - Dr. Maurer
- Verdammt die jungen Sünder nicht (1961) - Oskar Jüttner
- The Liar (1961) - Sperber
- The Longest Day (1962) - Field Marshal Erwin Rommel
- Tonio Kröger (1964) - Consul Kröger
- Praetorius (1965) - Violettas Vater
- Rheinsberg (1967) - Claire's Father
- Morning's at Seven (1968) - Grandfather
- When Sweet Moonlight Is Sleeping in the Hills (1969) - Grandfather
- Derrick - (Season 4, Episode 06: "Das Kuckucksei") (1977) - Vater Horre
- The Rider on the White Horse (1978) - Amtmann aus Husum
