= Adolf Fischer (actor) =

German character actor and film production manager (1900–1984)

- Born: 18 November 1900; Odessa, Russian Empire
- Died: 21 October 1984 (aged 83); Potsdam, East Germany
- Occupation: Actor
- Years active: 1931–1977

Adolf Fischer (18 November 1900 – 21 October 1984) was a German actor. He appeared in more than sixty films from 1931 to 1977.

== Selected filmography ==
Year	Title	Role	Notes
1931	Kameradschaft		
1932	Kuhle Wampe	Karl Genosse	
1932	Spoiling the Game		
1933	Three Bluejackets and a Blonde		
1935	The Green Domino	Maurer	
1937	Der Etappenhase		
1937	Alarm in Peking	Reiter	
1937	Unternehmen Michael		
1938	The Muzzle	Detective Schibulski	
1938	By a Silken Thread	Arbeiter bei Hellwerth	
1938	What Now, Sibylle?	Man on train	
1939	Uproar in Damascus	Spoekmann	
1939	D III 88	Gefreiter Zeissler	
1939	Shoulder Arms	Unteroffizier Schmidt	
1941	Stukas		
1941	Battle Squadron Lützow		
1942	Beloved World		
1942	Doctor Crippen	Funker Menton	
1943	Circus Renz		
1946	Somewhere in Berlin		
1944–1947	Quax in Africa	Brückner	
1965	Solange Leben in mir ist		
1977	The Incorrigible Barbara		
