= Destiny (1942 film) =

1942 film directed by Géza von Bolváry

- Directed by: Géza von Bolváry
- Written by: Gerhard Menzel
- Produced by: Fritz Podehl
- Starring: Heinrich George; Werner Hinz; Christian Kayßler
- Cinematography: Hans Schneeberger
- Edited by: Arnfried Heyne
- Music by: Anton Profes
- Production company: Wien-Film
- Release date: 18 March 1942
- Running time: 92 minutes
- Country: Germany
- Language: German

Destiny (German: Schicksal) is a 1942 Austrian-German historical drama film directed by Géza von Bolváry and starring Heinrich George, Werner Hinz, and Christian Kayßler. The film was made by Wien-Film, a company set up by the Germans after they had annexed Austria in 1938. The film's sets were designed by the art directors Kurt Herlth and Werner Schlichting. The film was banned after the Second World War for its perceived Nazi content.

== Plot ==
When the commander of a Bulgarian castle is killed in combat, his steward brings up his two children.

== Cast ==
- Heinrich George as Stephan Rakitin
- Werner Hinz as Kosta Wasileff
- Christian Kayßler as Fürst Melnik
- Heinz Woester as Mirko
- Walter Lieck as Irischkof
- Heinz Ohlsen as Fähnrich
- Wilfried Seyferth as Junger Kellner
- Karl Ehmann as Alter Kellner
- Josef Dahmen as Diener
- Adalet as Tänzerin und Sängerin
- Franz Eschle as Unterleutnant
- Will Quadflieg as Dimo
- Gisela Uhlen as Dimka
- Walter Werner as Dragan

== Bibliography ==
- Hull, David Stewart (1969). Film in the Third Reich: A Study of the German Cinema, 1933–1945. Berkeley: University of California Press. ISBN 978-0-520-01489-3.
