= Secret Informer =

- Wireless Weekly 5 July 1941
- Genre: drama play
- Running time: 60 mins (7:30 pm – 8:30 pm)
- Country of origin: Australia
- Language: English
- Written by: Gordon Ireland
- Directed by: John Cairns
- Original release: 7 July 1941

Secret Informer is a 1941 Australian radio play by Gordon Ireland about fifth columnists working on Australian radio.

The play was recorded in 1940 but had censorship issues and was delayed.

ABC Weekly called it "a racy behind-the-scenes account of Fifth Column tactics in a broadcasting studio. In the best traditions of espionage the villain is the man you’d least suspect, and the code he uses to put across news of troop movements so ingenious that we feel Gordon Ireland is wasted as Music Critic of the ABC Weekly."

A critic from Wireless Weekly said "I am not trying to be rude about this play because I believe that, if I could understand it, I would acknowledge its invention and design. But I could not keep up with the lightning deductions of [the hero] Mr. Pendleton, who would obviously have made a very good spy himself had he not been a music critic or a secret agent."

Ireland appeared in the original production.

Leslie Rees called it one of the best Australian radio dramas of 1941.

The ABC produced the play again in 1948.

== Premise ==
"An attempt to convey secret information to the enemy through the medium of broadcasting, results in Secret Service Investigator Pendleton’s effort to track down the source of intrigue. How he unravels the skein of mystery and unmasks the miscreant is told in this thriller, which takes the listener behind the scenes in the broadcasting world. Gordon Ireland writes ingeniously and with an inside knowledge of broadcasting, and the solution makes clever use of the author’s musical knowledge. Mr. Ireland is at pains to point out that the characters and plot of this play are entirely fictitious, having no relation, implied or direct, to any living person or persons."
