= Gordon Ireland =

New Zealand writer and composer

Gordon Ireland (1903–1965) was a New Zealand writer, composer, compere, producer and director.

He worked in radio in New Zealand, Britain and Australia and created over 800 shows. Ireland began his radio career in New Zealand then joined the ABC in Australia. He travelled in London in 1933 and worked for the BBC. Then he returned to the ABC in 1937.

A 1940 profile called him "one of the most versatile figures in Australian radio, having been comedian, pianist, singer, compere, and writer and producer of recorded features, such as travelogues with musical accompaniment, as well as a playwright."

== Select credits ==
- Joseph and his Brethren
- The Dark Invader
- Storm Over Everest
- Wings Over Westralia
- Story of a Song
- Arctic Adventure
- The Cruise of the Chelyuskin
- Secret Informer
