= The Guilt of Doctor Homma =

1951 film

- DVD cover
- Directed by: Paul Verhoeven
- Written by: Peter Pewas; Hans Otto Schröder
- Starring: Werner Hinz; Ilse Steppat; Viktoria von Ballasko
- Cinematography: Fritz Arno Wagner
- Edited by: Arthur Eckardt
- Music by: Friedrich Schröder
- Production companies: Lux-Film; Norddeutsche Filmproduktion
- Distributed by: Constantin Film
- Release date: 4 October 1951
- Running time: 89 minutes
- Country: West Germany
- Language: German

The Guilt of Doctor Homma (German: Die Schuld des Dr. Homma) is a 1951 West German crime film directed by Paul Verhoeven and starring Werner Hinz, Ilse Steppat and Viktoria von Ballasko. It was shot at Göttingen Studios and on location around Hanover. The film's sets were designed by the art director Erich Grave.

== Cast ==
- Werner Hinz as Dr. Magnus Homma
- Ilse Steppat as Dr. Ilse Kersten
- Liane Croon as Beate Homma
- Albrecht Schoenhals as Justizrat Kersten
- Viktoria von Ballasko as Karen Homma
- Herbert Hübner as Prosecutor Krell
- Hilde Hildebrand as Frau Burde
- Franz Schafheitlin as Landgerichtsdirektor von Herkenrath
- Karl Hellmer as Wachtmeister Schulz
- Paul Verhoeven as Anstaltspfarrer
- Joachim Brennecke as Wolfgang
- Lutz Moik as Gerhard Homma
- Herbert A.E. Böhme as Göbel, Scharfrichter
- Ruth Hähnle as Bärbel
- Jo Wiedenhaupt
- Doris Kiesow
- Heinz-Leo Fischer as Landgerichtsrat Holder
- Katharina Brauren as Berta
- Egon Vogel as Apotheker
- Arthur Mentz as Landgerichtsrat Dr. Herrmann
- Gertrud Wolle as Gesine
- Kurt Ehrhardt
- Alfred Schieske
- Andrea Grosske as Alice

== Bibliography ==
- Noack, Frank (2016). Veit Harlan: The Life and Work of a Nazi Filmmaker. University Press of Kentucky. ISBN 978-0-8131-6702-2.
