= Drei Unteroffiziere =

- Directed by: Werner Hochbaum
- Written by: Jacob Geis
- Starring: Albert Hehn; Fritz Genschow; Wilhelm König
- Music by: Sebastián Yradier
- Release date: 1939
- Running time: 94 minutes
- Country: Germany
- Language: German

Drei Unteroffiziere (Three Sergeants) is a 1939 German film.

Made soon before the outbreak of the Second World War, the film - as its name suggests - depicts the lives of three German army sergeants. While the plot focuses on the three protagonists' complicated love affairs rather than their battlefield exploits, it does extol camaraderie among soldiers - a staple theme of Nazi propaganda. The film concludes with the protagonists overcoming the amorous jealousies which threatened to divide them, and eagerly embarking on a dangerous military task. This theme is reflected in the film's poster, showing the three in uniform with their commanding officer while their love interest, Gerda, fills out the background.

After the defeat of Nazi Germany, Drei Unteroffiziere was included in the list of forbidden films, and nowadays its screening is only allowed for "special educational purposes".

== Cast ==
- Albert Hehn as Unteroffizier Erich Rauscher
- Fritz Genschow as Unteroffizier Fritz Kohlhammer
- Wilhelm König as Unteroffizier Struwe
- Wilhelm Althaus as Hauptmann Gruber
- Heinz Engelmann as Leutnant Strehl
- Wolfgang Staudte as Hauptfeldwebel Kern
- Ruth Hellberg as Gerda Cyrus
- Peter Anders as Operasinger
- Günther Ballier as Soldat der 3. Kompanie
- Josef Gindorf as Schütze der 3. Kompanie
- Malte Jäger as Schütze Hermannsfeld
- Christian Kayßler as Dr. Lauterbach, Kapellmeister
- Otto Klopsch as Ehemaliger Soldat, Gast in der "Grünen Erbse"
- Erwin Laurenz as Soldat der 3. Kompanie
- Guenther Markert as Ein Gast im Café
- Hermann Meyer-Falkow as Ein Kollege Gerdas
- Luise Morland as Frau Werner, Gerdas Hauswirtin
- Hermann Pfeiffer as Lohmann, Hilfsregisseur
- Waldemar Potier as unknown
- Ferry Reich as Schütze Hofacker
- Herbert Scholz as unknown
- Elisabeth Schwarzkopf as Carmen in den Theaterszenen
- Günther Treptow as Don José in den Theaterszenen
- Ingeborg von Kusserow as Lisbeth, Telefonistin
- Eduard Wandrey as Preysing in den Theaterszenen
- Claire Winter as Lotte, Verkäuferin

== See also ==
- List of films made in the Third Reich
- Nazism and cinema
