= Towers of Silence (film) =

1952 West German film by Hans Bertram

- Directed by: Hans Bertram
- Written by: Hans Bertram; Walter Ulbrich
- Produced by: Jochen Genzow
- Starring: Philip Dorn; Gisela Uhlen; Carl Raddatz
- Cinematography: Werner Krien
- Edited by: Gertrud Hinz-Nischwitz
- Music by: Herbert Trantow
- Production company: Allegro-Film
- Distributed by: Herzog Film
- Release date: 1 October 1952
- Running time: 92 minutes
- Country: West Germany
- Language: German

Towers of Silence (German: Türme des Schweigens) is a 1952 West German adventure film directed by Hans Bertram and starring Philip Dorn, Gisela Uhlen, and Carl Raddatz. It was shot on location in Amsterdam, Damascus and Palmyra. The film's sets were designed by the art director Max Mellin.

== Synopsis ==
In Syria the Dutch pilot Captain de Vries meets Helen Morrison, the wife of an archaeologist. When she leaves behind some jewellery he flies from Damascus to Palmyra to return it to her, and discovers her husband is attempting to find an ancient tomb in the hopes of getting rich from it. A more ruthless rival, Richard Poolmans, is on the track of the lost treasure too.

== Cast ==
- Philip Dorn as Captain de Vries
- Gisela Uhlen as Helen Morrison
- Carl Raddatz as Robert Morrison
- Hermann Schomberg as Richard Poolmans
- Hans Stiebner as Pelli
- Hans Hinrich as Colonel Souka

== Bibliography ==
- Bock, Hans-Michael; Bergfelder, Tim, eds. (2009). The Concise Cinegraph: Encyclopaedia of German Cinema. New York: Berghahn Books. ISBN 978-1-57181-655-9.
