= Confession Under Four Eyes =

1954 film

- Directed by: André Michel
- Written by: Hugo Maria Kritz (novel); Answald Krüger; Werner Jörg Lüddecke
- Produced by: Helmuth Volmer
- Starring: Hildegard Knef; Carl Raddatz; Ivan Desny
- Cinematography: Helmut Ashley
- Edited by: Anneliese Artelt
- Music by: Werner Eisbrenner
- Production company: Deutsche London-Film
- Distributed by: Deutsche London-Film
- Release date: 15 September 1954
- Running time: 100 minutes
- Country: West Germany
- Language: German

Confession Under Four Eyes (German: Geständnis unter vier Augen) is a 1954 West German crime drama film directed by André Michel and starring Hildegard Knef, Carl Raddatz and Ivan Desny. It was shot at Göttingen Studios and on location in Hamburg and a displaced persons camp near Nuremberg in Bavaria. The film's sets were designed by the art directors Ernst H. Albrecht and Paul Markwitz.

== Cast ==
- Hildegard Knef as Hilde Schaumburg-Garden
- Carl Raddatz as Dr. Frigge
- Ivan Desny as Gregor Marmara
- Werner Hinz as Jorga
- Franz Schafheitlin as Chef Director, Dr. Kopp
- Stanislav Ledinek as Carol
- Ursula Grabley as Reporter
- Hans Christian Blech as Tscheche

== Bibliography ==
- Broadbent, Philip & Hake, Sabine. Berlin Divided City, 1945-1989. Berghahn Books, 2010.
