= Gisela Uhlen =

German actress

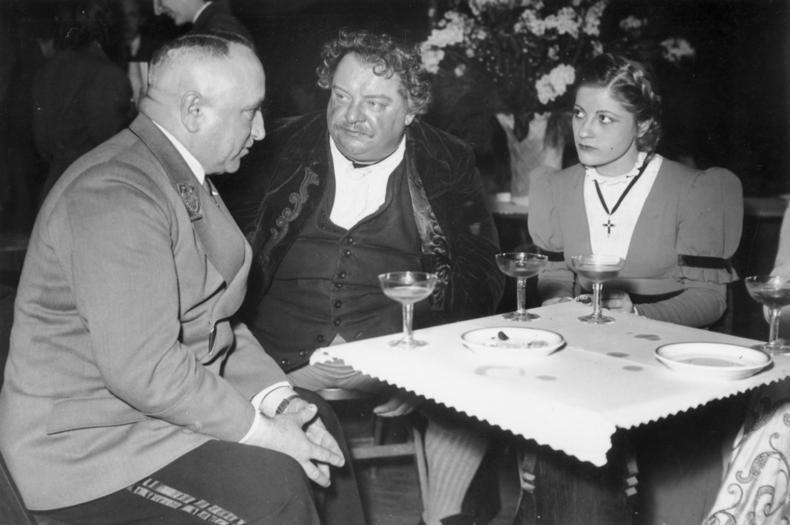
Gisela Uhlen (right), with Robert Ley (left) and Heinrich George, 1941: during a guest appearance of the Berliner Schiller-Theater in occupied France

Gisela Uhlen (16 May 1919 – 16 January 2007) was a German film actress and occasional screen writer.

== Biography ==
Uhlen was born Gisela Friedlinde Schreck in Leipzig, Germany as fourth child of Luise Frieda and distillery owner and former opera singer Augustin Schreck.

At the Leipziger Konservatorium she enrolled in a modern dance class, and learnt classical ballet and acrobatics at the opera school. At 15 she decided to become a theatre actress and chose the stage-name Gisela Uhlen. After her final examination as a dancer and during her training period she married ballet teacher Herbert Freund.

At 17 she appeared for the first time at the Schauspielhaus Bochum. In 1938 Heinrich George brought her to the Berliner Schiller-Theater, where she was active until the end of the war. But even before her first stage appearance she had made film tests with Universum Film AG (Ufa), and thereby obtained the leading actress role in the 1936 film Annemarie. Die Geschichte einer Jungen Liebe. After the war performance of this film was prohibited. Uhlen played a young organist whose lover volunteered to go to the front and there died.

From 1936 through 1960, Uhlen appeared in 23 films, and in 1960 she steered her career into television. Her career was active throughout her lifetime, with her having more than 56 television appearances into 2006, entirely in the German and European realm.

She married six times, most notably to German writer, director and producer Hans Bertram, with whom she had daughter Barbara Bertram, who also became an actress, but with little success. With Wolfgang Kieling she had a daughter Susanne Uhlen, who is now a successful German actress. During the Cold War, and following her divorce from Hans Bertram, Uhlen fled into East Germany to avoid a custody battle over their daughter, an unusual move in a time when most people were attempting to escape from East Germany, but moved to West Berlin in 1960.

== Filmography ==
- 1936: Annemarie. Die Geschichte einer jungen Liebe - Annemarie Brinkmann
- 1938: Liebelei und Liebe - Elsbeth Schellenbach
- 1938: Dance on the Volcano - Schauspielerin Angèle Destouches
- 1939: Morgen werde ich verhaftet - Eva Burger
- 1939: Man for Man - Erika Barrels
- 1940: Die Rothschilds - Phyllis - Bearings Tochter
- 1940: Die unvollkommene Liebe - Krista
- 1940: Between Hamburg and Haiti - 'Bella' Anna Wittstock
- 1941: Ohm Krüger - Petra Krüger
- 1942: Destiny - Dimka
- 1942: Between Heaven and Earth - Christine Burger
- 1942: Rembrandt - Hendrickje Stoffels
- 1942: 5 June - Luise Reiniger
- 1942: Symphonie eines Lebens - Gräfin Ilka Baross
- 1943: Die beiden Schwestern - Gabriele Wilkens
- 1944: Die Zaubergeige - Agnes
- 1945: The Silent Guest - Lisa Radscheck
- 1949: Eine große Liebe - Sabine von Brackwitz
- 1950: The Falling Star - Lore Hollreiser
- 1951: Der schweigende Mund - Stella Hirth
- 1952: Towers of Silence - Helen Morrison
- 1956: Das Traumschiff - Michaela Gast
- 1958: Emilia Galotti - Gräfin Orsina
- 1958: Der Prozeß wird vertagt - Marie Jäger
- 1959: Reifender Sommer - Sabine Gärtner
- 1960: Mit 17 weint man nicht - Rita Wegener
- 1962: Der Gärtner von Toulouse (TV film) - Frau Téophot
- 1962: Das Mädchen und der Staatsanwalt - Schwester Magda
- 1962: The Door with Seven Locks - Emely Cody, geb. Cawler
- 1963: Aufstand der Gehorsamen (TV film) - Mariana Seisowa
- 1963: The Indian Scarf - Mrs. Tilling
- 1965: Hotel of Dead Guests - Ruth Cornell - geb. Marlowe
- 1965: A Holiday with Piroschka - Mrs. Laurends
- 1965: Die eigenen vier Wände (TV film) - Georgia Witt
- 1966: Geschlossene Gesellschaft (TV film) - Ines
- 1966: The Hunchback of Soho - Mrs. Tyndal
- 1967: Der Panamaskandal (TV film) - Frau Girard
- 1967: Der Tod läuft hinterher (TV miniseries) - Myrna Collins
- 1968: Emma Hamilton - Mrs Love
- 1969: Die Zimmerschlacht (TV film) - Trude Fürst
- 1969: Dr. Fabian: Laughing Is the Best Medicine - Henriette Gambaroff
- 1971: Leiche gesucht (TV film) - Faith Barraclough / Hope Barraclough
- 1974: Three Men in the Snow - Frau von Wolzogen
- 1975: Der Edelweißkönig - Mother of Luitpold
- 1975: To the Bitter End
- 1975–1979: Tatort (TV series) - Frau Brenner / Vivian / Frau Stumm
- 1976: Lobster (TV series) - Hedwig Brühl
- 1976: Die Hellseherin (TV film)
- 1977: Women in New York (TV film)
- 1978–1990: Derrick (TV series) - Irma Labuch / Henriette Hauff / Frau Bilser
- 1979: Die Ehe der Maria Braun - Mother
- 1982: Wir haben uns doch mal geliebt - Gräfin
- 1982: Meister Eder und sein Pumuckl (TV series) - Gräfin
- 1983: Die zweite Frau (TV film) - Frau Löhn
- 1991: Toto the Hero - Old Evelyne
- 1992: Zürich – Transit - Mutter
- 1996: Die Katze von Kensington (TV film) - Lady Smith
- 1997: Der Coup (TV film) - Florence de la Rochefoucauld
- 1998: Edgar Wallace: Das Haus der toten Augen (TV film) - Emma Miller
- 1989–2006: Forsthaus Falkenau (TV series) - Ingeborg 'Inge' Feininger verw. Rombach (final appearance)

== Stage appearances ==
- 1953: Minna von Barnhelm von Gotthold Ephraim Lessing
- 1957: Lysistrata nach Aristophanes
- 1958: Die Dreigroschenoper von Bertolt Brecht
- 1962: Die kleinen Füchse von Lillian Hellman
- 1964: Der Mann von nebenan von Norman Ginsbury
- 1964: Ein Leben lang von William Saroyan
- 1966: Geschlossene Gesellschaft von Jean-Paul Sartre
- 1969: Die Zimmerschlacht von Martin Walser
- 1972: Heiraten von George Bernard Shaw
- 1974: Das Mißverständnis von Albert Camus
- 1976: Frauen in New York von Clare Booth
- 1977: Marie Tudor von Victor Hugo
- 1977: Wer hat Angst vor Virginia Woolf? von Edward Albee
- 1984: Der Besuch der alten Dame von Friedrich Dürrenmatt
- 1986: Die Irre con Chaillot von Jean Giradoux
- 1990: Die Physiker von Friedrich Dürrenmatt
- 1992: Die Glasmenagerie von Tennessee Williams
- 1993: Hedda Gabler von Henrik Ibsen
- 1997: Mord im Pfarrhaus von Agatha Christie

== Books ==
- Umarmungen und Enthüllungen. Berlin : Parthas-Verl., 2002. ISBN 3-932529-33-2
- Meine Droge ist das Leben. Weinheim : Beltz, Quadriga, 1993. ISBN 3-88679-199-8
- Mein Glashaus. Frankfurt/M : Ullstein, 1991. ISBN 3-7770-0178-3
