= Eine große Liebe =

1949 film by Hans Bertram

Eine Große Liebe
- Directed by: Hans Bertram
- Written by: Hans Bertram; Gisela Uhlen
- Starring: Gisela Uhlen
- Cinematography: Georg Bruckbauer
- Edited by: Rudolf Schaad; Fritz Stapenhorst
- Release date: 9 September 1949
- Running time: 90 minutes
- Country: Germany
- Language: German

Eine große Liebe (English: True Love) is a 1949 German film directed by Hans Bertram. It was entered into the 1949 Cannes Film Festival.

== Cast ==
- Gisela Uhlen
- Michael Korrontay
- Barbara Bertram
- Rüdiger von Sperl
- Erika von Thellmann
- Udo Loeptin
- Hertha von Hagen
- Gustav Waldau
- Elisabeth Flickenschildt
