= Mexican Werewolf in Texas =

2005 American film directed by Scott Maginnis

- Promotional artwork
- Directed by: Scott Maginnis
- Written by: Scott Maginnis
- Starring: Erika Fay; Gabriel Gutierrez
- Release date: September 18, 2005
- Running time: 88 minutes
- Country: United States
- Language: English

Mexican Werewolf in Texas is a 2005 American direct-to-video horror film directed by Scott Maginnis and executive produced by Randy Mermell. The title is a reference to the 1981 horror comedy film An American Werewolf in London, which is in turn a reference to An American in Paris and Werewolf of London. Despite its name, Mexican Werewolf in Texas does not feature a werewolf, but the chupacabra or "goat-sucker" of Latin American folklore, which one character compares to a hairy wolf. It is one of a number of chupacabra-themed horror films released in the early 2000s, including several in 2005 alone. It received negative reviews. Critics felt the movie commented on racism in the United States.

== Plot ==
In Furlough, a small Texas border town and self-proclaimed "goat capital of the world," the mythical chupacabra has begun to terrorize the populace. At first it drains the blood from goats in the town, then starts targeting people with animal blood on them. As the deaths escalate and police dismiss the attacks, a group of townspeople decides to fight back. The film is narrated by Anna Furlough, a teenager who longs to escape the small town; other residents include her boyfriend Miguel Gonzalez, a computer nerd and son of veterinarian Manny; her best friend Rosie, a straight-A student who hopes to attend the University of Texas at Austin; her father Brad, an undertaker and former town scion; Jill Gillespie, the bubbly girlfriend of farmer's son Tommy who flashes the monster while on a hunt; and Cabot Speers, an eccentric "alien hunter" whom the teenagers hire to capture the creature and earn a bounty.

The chupacabra continues to prey on the town, killing Tommy, Manny's daughter Maria, and Rosie (who brings a bag of raw meat on a monster hunt). Meanwhile, Anna's father, who disapproves of her relationship and harbors racist resentment against the town's increasing Mexican-American population, plots to kill Miguel and frame the chupacabra for the death. Brad dresses up in pelts to disguise himself as the chupacabra, wielding a meat-fork whose tines are meant to resemble the creature's fangs, and stalks the couple. Miguel, mistaking him for the actual chupacabra, shoots him upon Anna's urging.

== Cast ==
- Erika Fay as Anna Furlough
- Gabriel Gutierrez as Miguel Gonzalez
- Michael Carreo as Tommy
- Martine Hughes as Rosie
- Sara Erikson as Jill Gillespie
- Louie Cruz Beltran as Manny Gonzalez
- Mark Halvorson as Brad Furlough
- Leslie Marshall as Carol Furlough
- Randy Mermell as Bob Gillespie
- Courtney DuBois as Sandy Gillespie
- Wolfgang Metzger as Cabot Speers
- Sandy Malcom as Virgil Furlough
- Alan Rackley as Enis Furlough
- Brandon Hudspeth as Adam Furlough
- Mark Twogood as Sheriff Sam Burry
- Chuck Loring as Deputy Stan Newton
- Elizabeth Del Sol as Maria
- Larry Brister as Jan Strauss

== Critical reception ==
The film received largely poor reviews by horror writers. Nevertheless, critic Kim Newman noted that "for a cheapie, [it] has more going on in [the] acting and scripting department as usual," author Barb Karg called it "an eccentric lycan flick worthy of B-movie status," and University of New Mexico professor Jesse Alemán, in an overview of folklore creatures in horror movies, called it "the better of the numerous Chupacabra films to crop up over the past few years."

Lexikon des internationalen Films, a German-language reference work on all theatrical films and many direct-to-video films that have been released in Germany since 1945, said Mexican Werewolf in Texas "can easily be read as a paraphrase of everyday racism in the U.S., which is questioned through a 'Romeo and Juliet' story. (...) that uses the genre framework for thought-provoking entertainment."

== Themes ==
Alemán discusses the film's treatment of anti-Chicano racism and tension over the changing population and faltering economy of Furlough; he likens the chupacabra to "an embodiment of racism and social oppression that terrorizes the town." The name of the town's founders, Furlough, carries a double meaning of job loss, and Alemán argues that Brad Furlough turning himself into the monster is an outward expression of his racial and class resentment.
