= Christian Kayßler =

German actor

- Born: Christian Friedrich Kayssler; 14 June 1898; Breslau, German Empire
- Died: 10 March 1944 (aged 45); Berlin, Nazi Germany
- Occupation: Actor

Christian Friedrich Kayssler, commonly spelled Kayßler (14 June 1898 – 10 March 1944), was a German stage and film actor. He was the son of the actor Friedrich Kayßler. He appeared in 14 films before dying in an Allied bombing raid on Berlin in March 1944 during World War II. He played one of the major roles in the 1939 aviation film D III 88.

== Filmography ==
Year	Title	Role	Notes
1935	The Old and the Young King		
1937	Pan	Glahn	
1937	Unternehmen Michael	Rittmstr. v. Wengern	
1939	Target in the Clouds	Krasselt	
1939	Drei Unteroffiziere	Dr. Lauterbach, Kapellmeister	
1939	D III 88	Oberleutnant Mithoff	
1939	Dein Leben gehört mir		
1940	Achtung! Feind hört mit!	Dr. Hellmers, Chefkonstrukteur	
1941	Battle Squadron Lützow	Oberst Mithoff	
1941	Ich klage an	Landgerichtsdirektor Kriebelmeyer	
1942	Destiny	Fürst Melnik	
1942	Andreas Schlüter	von Anhalt-Dessau	
1942	The Dismissal	Graf Herbert Bismarck	(final film role)
