= Storm Over Everest =

- Genre: drama play
- Running time: 60 mins
- Country of origin: Australia
- Language: English
- Written by: Gordon Ireland
- Original release: September 1939

Storm Over Everest is a 1939 Australian radio play by Gordon Ireland. It tells of various attempts to climb Mount Everest.

== Details ==
It was very popular and sold to South Africa and the BBC.

A reviewer from Wireless Weekly wrote: "The action was rather bitsy; necessarily so, covering, as it did, so many isolated attacks on the mountain. The commentators. Max Osbiston and Eric Masters, covered a great part of the story and told it very effectively. I thought the Voice of the Mountain had a little too much competition from the blizzard... it was an excellent play, capably produced by Lawrence Cecil. The intricate effects — blizzards, avalanches, human cries from the abysses, etc. — were realistically handled."
