= Wings Over Westralia =

1936 radio play

- Genre: drama play
- Country of origin: Britain
- Language: English
- Syndicates: BBC
- Starring: Leo de Pokorny
- Written by: Gordon Ireland
- Original release: August 12, 1936

Wings Over Westralia is a 1936 British radio play by New Zealand author Gordon Ireland about the flight of Hans Bertram in 1932. The play was hugely popular and aired on the BBC and in Germany, the US, New Zealand, Holland and Czechoslovakia. It was called "one of the most successful radio plays ever written".

The play was broadcast throughout Australia in 1936. It was produced again in 1954.

Reviewing a 1954 production The Age said "it was more in the nature of a documentary with trimmings, these being a series of scenes depicting the struggles of the two airmen to keep alive. They were over-written and overacted to the extent of making them probably a hundred times more sensational than they really were. Such harrowing scenes— harrowing only if they have any resemblance to reality, which these had not— have nothing to do with written dramatic art. They are neither edifying, entertaining nor provocative of emotion unless the listener is one of those persons who take delight in witnessing human beings dying in extremis and suffering the pangs of hell."

== Premise ==
"Beginning with the setting out in 1932 of the two young German aviators, Bertram and Klausmann, from Koepang, in the Junkers W 33 seaplane Atlantis, the thrilling narrative follows faithfully their 48 days of suffering, misadventure, and apparently hopeless abandonment in Australian bush."
