= D III 88 =

1939 film by Herbert Maisch and Hans Bertram

- Directed by: Herbert Maisch; Hans Bertram
- Written by: Wolf Neumeister; Hans Bertram
- Produced by: Fred Lyssa
- Starring: Christian Kayßler; Otto Wernicke; Heinz Welzel; Hermann Braun
- Cinematography: Georg Krause; Heinz von Jaworsky
- Edited by: Carl Otto Bartning
- Music by: Robert Küssel
- Production company: Tobis Film
- Distributed by: Tobis Film
- Release date: 26 October 1939
- Country: Germany
- Language: German

D III 88 (sometimes written as DIII 88) is a 1939 German drama film directed by Herbert Maisch and Hans Bertram, the latter also having co-written the script. It stars Christian Kayßler, Otto Wernicke and Heinz Welzel. It was made as a propaganda film with the support of Luftwaffe chief Hermann Göring, and was the last of a series of Nazi aviation films to be made before the outbreak of World War II. It was one of the most commercially successful films released during the Nazi era. It was praised by Joseph Goebbels as "an irreproachable film of national destiny". The title, referring to the registration number of the Fokker Dr.I flown by one of the characters in World War I, was an attempt to re-inforce the propaganda link between the modern Luftwaffe and that of World War I. A sequel, Battle Squadron Lützow, was made in 1941.

== Synopsis ==
Two extraordinary young pilots engage in a competitive rivalry and also fight over the same girl. In an effort to show off both fly into a dangerous storm, damaging their planes and are suspended from duty. They are finally convinced by their commanding officer, a veteran of World War I, to use their talents in a more disciplined way for their country.

== Cast ==
- Christian Kayßler as Oberleutnant Mithoff
- Otto Wernicke as Oberwerkmeister Bonicke
- Heinz Welzel as Obergefreiter Fritz Paulsen
- Hermann Braun as Obergefreiter Robert Eckhard
- Adolf Fischer as Gefreiter Zeissler
- Horst Birr as Monteur Hasinger
- Karl Martell as Lt. Ludwig Becker
- Fritz Eberth as Funker Lindner
- Carsta Löck as Bauernmagd Lina
- Paul Otto as General
- Paul Bildt as Stabsarzt der Flugstaffel
- Hans Bernuth as Flieger
- Ernst Dernburg as Adm. beim Manöver
- Erich Dunskus as Bauer
- Heinz Engelmann as Lt. Frank
- Ilse Fürstenberg as Bäuerin
- Malte Jäger as 1. Funker
- Ferry Reich as 2. Funker
- Josef Kamper as Bauernknecht
- Hilde Land as Kantinenwirtin
- Guenther Markert as Marineoffizier
- Hans Meyer-Hanno as Kantinenwirt
- Egon Vogel as Sanitäter
- Eduard von Winterstein as Landarzt
- Wolfgang Staudte as Marineoffizier
- Walter Gross as Funker
- Theo Brandt as Fliegeroffizier

== Production ==
Paul Otto, a Jewish actor working under a false name, played a German general in the film and later committed suicide after his Jewish identity was revealed.

== Works cited ==
- Waldman, Harry (2008). Nazi Films In America, 1933-1942. McFarland & Company. ISBN 9780786438617.

== Bibliography ==
- Paris, Michael (1995). From the Wright Brothers to Top Gun: Aviation, Nationalism, and Popular Cinema. Manchester, UK: Manchester University Press. ISBN 978-0-7190-4074-0.
