= Heinz von Jaworsky =

German cinematographer

- Born: 1912; Berlin, Germany
- Died: 17 July 1999 (aged 86–87); New York, New York, United States
- Occupation: Cinematographer
- Years active: 1932-1968 (film)

Heinz von Jaworsky (1912–1999) was a German cinematographer.

== Selected filmography ==
- The Champion of Pontresina (1934)
- Miracle of Flight (1935)
- The Traitor (1936)
- D III 88 (1939)
- Quax the Crash Pilot (1941)
- Battle Squadron Lützow (1941)
- Allez Hopp (1946)
- Spy for Germany (1956)

== Bibliography ==
- Rainer Rother. Leni Riefenstahl: The Seduction of Genius. A&C Black, 2003.
