= Bismarck (1940 film) =

1940 film by Wolfgang Liebeneiner

- Directed by: Wolfgang Liebeneiner
- Written by: Rolf Lauckner; Wolfgang Liebeneiner
- Produced by: Heinrich Jonen; Willi Wiesner
- Starring: Paul Hartmann; Friedrich Kayßler; Lil Dagover
- Cinematography: Bruno Mondi
- Edited by: Walter von Bonhorst
- Music by: Norbert Schultze
- Production company: Tobis Film
- Distributed by: Tobis Film
- Release date: 6 December 1940
- Running time: 118 minutes
- Country: Nazi Germany
- Language: German
- Budget: 1,794,000 ℛℳ
- Box office: 4.4 million ℛℳ

Bismarck is a 1940 German historical film directed by Wolfgang Liebeneiner and starring Paul Hartmann, Friedrich Kayßler, and Lil Dagover.

This film depicts the life of the Prussian statesman Otto von Bismarck, a German nationalist and lonely genius who withstands the Reichstag to act on behalf of the people. It was followed by a sequel Die Entlassung in 1942, with Emil Jannings taking over the title role.

The film was made at the Johannisthal Studios in Berlin by Tobis Film one of the leading German companies of the era. It was shot at a variety of locations involving several related to the historic events of film including in Berlin, Vienna, Bad Gastein and Babelsberg Palace. Plau am See in Mecklenburg was also used for shooting. The film's sets were designed by the art directors Karl Machus and Erich Zander.

== Plot ==
The film recalls the nineteenth century desire for German unification which at the time was threatened from several corners. From the liberals, from crown prince Frederich (who is shown as an English puppet) and the French who attempt to annex the left bank of the Rhine. The historical feature opens in 1862 with King Wilhelm I appointing Bismarck as head of the Prussian government. With Germany divided into 35 different political entities and power transferred to various principalities, the nation is portrayed as desperately longing for national unity. The Austrian Kaiser, also wishing unity, appears unconcerned with the northern province. His interest rests in asserting control over the German Confederation. Wilhelm I, unable to control the parliament, is on the verge of abdication. The crown prince and his English wife wish the installation of a British style government which may undermine German unity. The king's last resort is the appointment of Bismarck as his Prime Minister. Bismarck's first political act is to dissolve the Prussian parliament following the refusal of an opposition leader, Virchow, to finance military reform and rearmament plans.

From 1864 to 1871, Bismarck wages several wars against Denmark, Austria, and France. According to his main political principle; the most decisive political questions are not solved by parliamentary discussions and resolutions but by "Eisen und Blut", Iron (weaponry) and blood alone. The film concludes with the 1871 proclamation of a new German Empire at the Hall Of Mirrors in Versailles. United under the leadership of Prussia, the new nation is armed with a strong military force built to withstand powerful and malevolent neighbours.

Armed forces victories are depicted as the handiwork of one great man; the Battle of Königgrätz is viewed solely the work of General Moltke. There are no battlefield recreations.

The storyline blends history with Third Reich era propaganda such as the assassination attempt on Bismarck by Ferdinand Cohen-Blind, who the film calls, an "English Jew", heroically stopped by Bismarck, unscathed by bullets. Spending a few years in England, his motives are questioned over his loyalty in preservation of the German state. Surreptitiously viewing an "evil Jew" attempt to halt German unity, there is also an underlying twin theme of the disruption of German Politics by the English. Bismarck believes this to be a sign from god that he is destined to unite Germany.

Released in the wake of the 1939 Molotov–Ribbentrop Pact, it depicts a parallel view to Bismarck's that a Russian alliance will safeguard the Prussians in the east.

== Cast ==
- Paul Hartmann as Otto von Bismarck
- Friedrich Kayßler as King Wilhelm I
- Lil Dagover as Empress Eugénie
- Käthe Haack as Johanna von Bismarck
- Maria Koppenhöfer as Queen Augusta
- Walter Franck as Emperor Napoleon III
- Ruth Hellberg as Princess Victoria
- Werner Hinz as Prince Friedrich
- Margret Militzer as Countess Marie von Bismarck
- Karl Schönböck as Kaiser Franz Joseph
- Günther Hadank as Minister Moltke
- Hellmuth Bergmann as Minister von Roon
- Karl Haubenreißer as Dr. Rudolf Virchow
- Otto Gebühr as King John of Saxony
- Jaspar von Oertzen as Prince Friedrich Karl
- Harald Paulsen as Benedetti
- Karl Meixner as Ludwig Loewe
- Hans Junkermann as Field Marshall Wrangel
- Otto Graf as Robert von Keudell
- Franz Schafheitlin as Prince Metternich
- Bruno Hübner as Count Rechberg
- Paul Hoffmann as Count von Blome
- Otto Stoeckel as Minister President Beust
- Otto Below as Lothar Bucher
- Eduard von Winterstein as General von Manstein
- Karl Fochler as Count Karolyi
- Wilhelm P. Krüger as Lakai Kuhn
- Arthur Fritz Eugens as Wilhelm - Bismarck's Son

== Production ==
The music was composed by Norbert Schultze. Bismarck cost 1,794,000 ℛℳ (equivalent to $7,940,501 in 2021) to produce.

== Release ==
The film was approved by the censors on 19 November 1940, and premiered on 6 December. It earned 4.4 million ℛℳ (equivalent to $19,475,029 in 2021) at the box office for a profit of 1,989,000 ℛℳ (equivalent to $8,803,599 in 2021). Its success led to a sequel, The Dismissal, being produced.

== Works cited ==
- Leiser, Erwin (1975). Nazi Cinema. New York: Macmillan. ISBN 978-0-02-570230-1.
- Waldman, Harry (2008). Nazi Films In America, 1933-1942. McFarland & Company. ISBN 9780786438617.
- Welch, David (1983). Propaganda and the German Cinema: 1933-1945. I.B. Tauris. ISBN 9781860645204.
