= Hans Bertram =

German aviator, screenwriter and film director

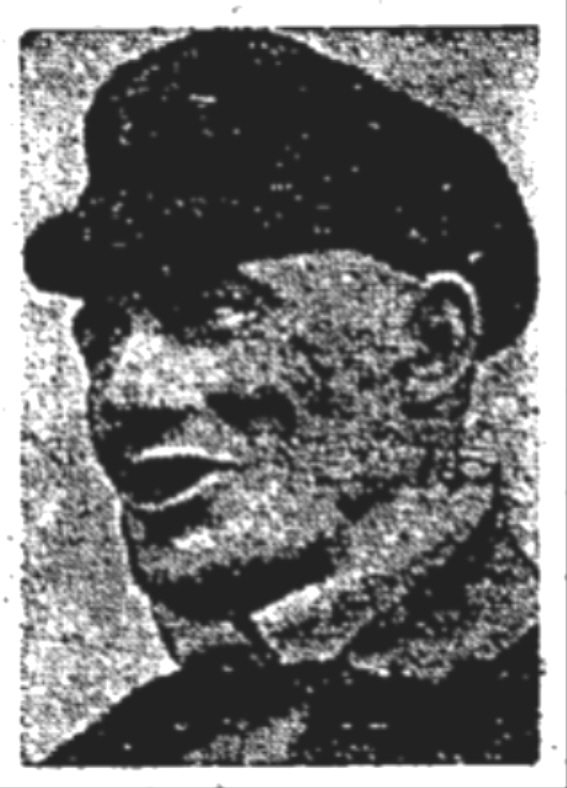
- Born: Hans-Karl Bertram; 26 February 1906; Remscheid, Germany
- Died: 8 January 1993 (aged 86); Munich, Germany
- Occupations: Aviator, screenwriter, film director
- Years active: 1938–1985
- Spouse: Gisela Uhlen
- Military career
- Allegiance: Nazi Germany
- Branch: Luftwaffe
- Service years: 1938–1945
- Rank: Major

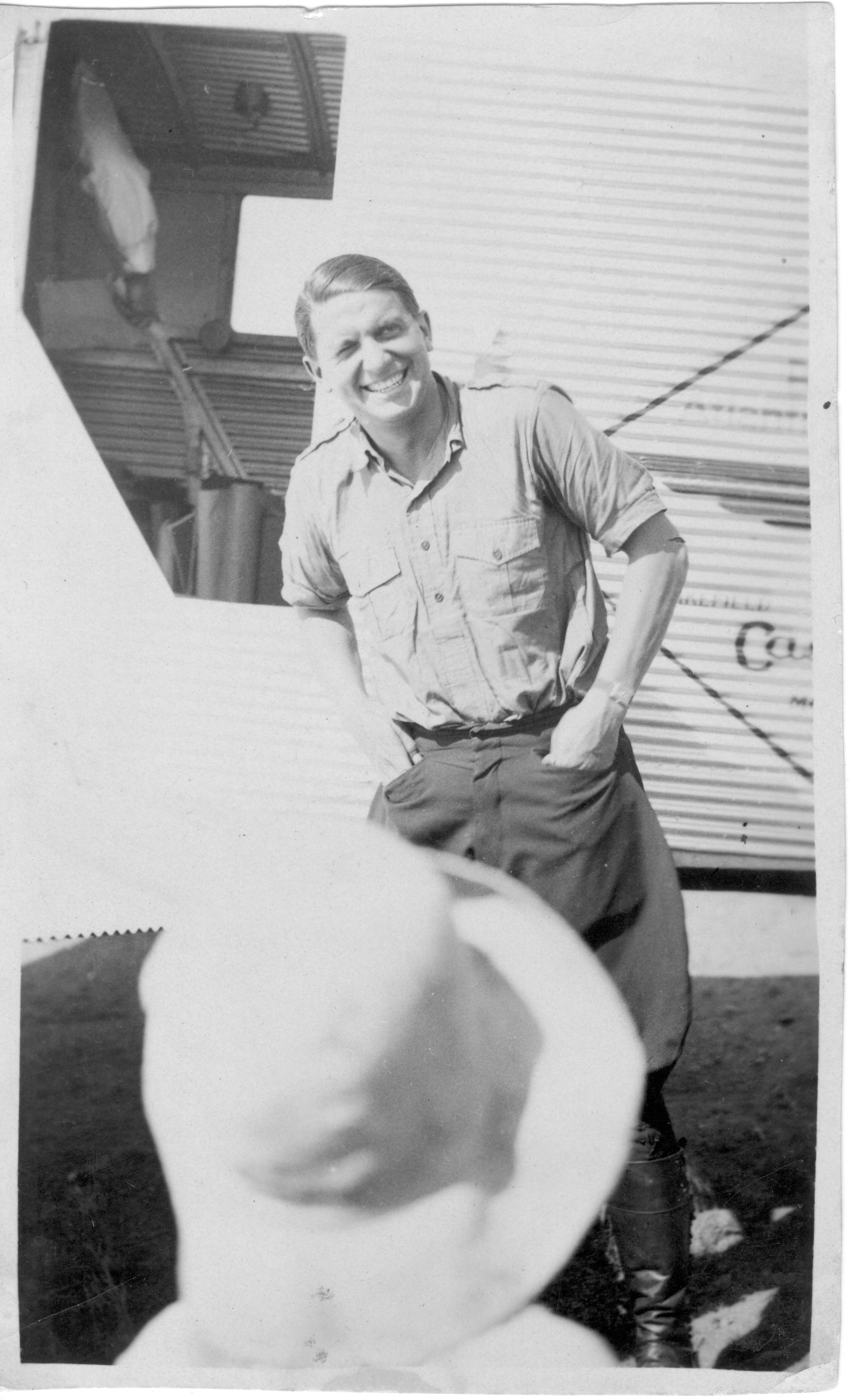
Bertram and his plane in Alice Springs in the early 1930s

Hans Bertram (26 February 1906 – 8 January 1993) was a German aviator, screenwriter and film director.

== Biography ==
=== Early life ===
Hans Bertram was born on 26 February 1906 in Remscheid, Germany.

=== Career ===
During 1920, Bertram trained under flying instructor Paul Bäumer, a noted German aviator of World War I, at Hamburg Fuhlsbuttel Airport.

From 1927, Bertram was an aviation advisor to the Chinese government and was involved in establishing its naval aviation service.

When Bertram piloted a Junkers W 33 seaplane on an around-the world flight during 1932, he became lost over a sparsely populated part of the Kimberley region of Western Australia and made a forced landing. Bertram and mechanic Adolf Klausmann were rescued and hospitalised in Perth. Klausmann suffered significant long-term psychological effects from their ordeal. Books by Bertram regarding his adventures became best-sellers in Germany during 1933. It was dramatised in the radio play Wings Over Westralia.

In 1934, Bertram joined the Nazi Party and the SA ("Brownshirts").

Bertram's script for a drama set in an Australian gold mining town, was made into Frauen für Golden Hill ("Women for Golden Hill"), released in 1938. The World War I aviation drama D III 88 (1939), also written by Bertram, was made with the support of Luftwaffe chief Hermann Göring. Another script by Bertram (based on a novel by Nicola Rhon), was endorsed by the Nazis: Der Fuchs von Glenarvon ("The Fox of Glenarvon") set in Ireland during the 1880s and concerned with Irish opposition to British rule was released in 1940.

During World War II, Bertram wrote and directed two feature-length propaganda-oriented documentaries about German aviators. While on active service with the Luftwaffe during 1941, he was shot down in Libya and taken prisoner. Bertram was sent to POW camps in Australia (where he was to remain for the duration of the war).

Meanwhile, in Germany, release of Bertram's film Symphonie eines Lebens ("Symphony of a Life") was suspended when it was found that he had employed Jews, such as the lead actor Harry Baur. Bertram's membership of the Reich Chamber of Culture was suspended and when Symphonie eines Lebens was released (1942), the names of Bertram, the rest of the crew and cast were omitted from the credits.

Bertram wrote the scripts of 10 films completed between 1938 and 1985, and directed six films.

In 1985, the Australian Broadcasting Corporation screened Flight into Hell, a television miniseries based on Bertram's accounts of his experiences during 1932.

=== German language books authored by Bertram ===
- 1933: Flug in die Hölle. Mein australisches Abenteuer. Frankfurt/Berlin; Ullstein.
- 1933: Flug in die Hölle. Bericht von der „Bertram-Atlantis-Expedition“. Berlin; Drei Masken Verlag.
- 1937: Ruf der weiten Welt. Berlin; Drei Masken Verlag.
- 1954: Flug zu den Sternen. München/Wien/Basel; Verlag Kurt Desch.
- 1980: Götterwind. Pioniere der Luftfahrt. Frankfurt/Berlin; Universitas. (A revised edition of Flug zu den Sternen.)

=== Filmography ===
- 1938: Frauen für Golden Hill a.k.a. Women for Golden Hill (scriptwriter)
- 1939: D III 88 (scriptwriter, in collaboration with Wolf Neumeister)
- 1940: Baptism of Fire ["Baptism of Fire. Film from Operations by our Air Force in Poland] (director; scriptwriter)
- 1940: Der Fuchs von Glenarvon a.k.a. The Fox of Glenarvon (scriptwriter)
- 1941: Kampfgeschwader Lützow ["Battle Squadron Lützow"] (director, line producer, scriptwriter)
- 1942: Symphonie eines Lebens ["Symphony of a Life"] (director, line producer, scriptwriter)
- 1949: Eine große Liebe a.k.a. True Love (director; scriptwriter)
- 1950: Der verzauberte Klang ["The Enchanted Sound"] (short documentary) (director)
- 1952: Türme des Schweigens a.k.a. Towers of Silence (director; scriptwriter)

=== Personal life ===
He was married to German actress Gisela Uhlen. Bertram died on 8 January 1993 in Munich, Germany.
