= Ohm Krüger =

1941 film directed by Hans Steinhoff

- Directed by: Hans Steinhoff
- Written by: Harald Bratt; Kurt Heuser
- Based on: Mann ohne Volk by Arnold Krieger
- Produced by: Emil Jannings
- Starring: Emil Jannings; Lucie Höflich; Werner Hinz; Ernst Schröder; Elisabeth Flickenschildt; Ferdinand Marian
- Cinematography: Fritz Arno Wagner
- Edited by: Martha Dübber; Hans Heinrich
- Music by: Theo Mackeben
- Production company: Tobis Film
- Release dates: 4 April 1941 (Nazi Germany); 1 October 1941 (France); 15 March 1942 (Finland)
- Running time: 135 minutes
- Country: Nazi Germany
- Language: German
- Budget: 5.477 million ℛℳ
- Box office: 5.5 million ℛℳ

Ohm Krüger (English: Uncle Krüger) is a 1941 German biographical film directed by Hans Steinhoff and starring Emil Jannings, Lucie Höflich, and Werner Hinz. It was one of a series of major propaganda films produced in Nazi Germany attacking the United Kingdom. The film depicts the life of the South African politician Paul Kruger and his eventual defeat by the British during the Boer War.

It was the first film to be awarded the 'Film of the Nation' award. It was re-released in 1944.

== Plot ==
The film opens with a dying Paul Kruger speaking about his life to his nurse in a Geneva hotel. The rest of the film is told in flashback.

Cecil Rhodes has a great desire to acquire land in the Transvaal region of the Boers for its gold deposits. He sends Dr Jameson there to provoke border disturbances and secures support from Joseph Chamberlain. When Chamberlain seeks the support of Queen Victoria and her son Edward, Prince of Wales, she initially refuses but changes her mind when she is informed of the gold in the region. She invites Kruger to London and believes that she is tricking him into signing a treaty.

Kruger, being suspicious of the British, has his own plans. Kruger signs the treaty, which gives the British access to the gold, but he imposes high taxes and establishes a monopoly over the sale of TNT, which forces the British to buy explosives at high prices. Hence, ultimately, Kruger tricks the British by signing the treaty. That impresses some of the British, as they find Krüger is their equal in matters of cunning, which is supposed to be the defining characteristic of the British. Having been outmaneuvered, Rhodes tries to buy Kruger's allegiance. Kruger and his wife Sanna, however, are incorruptible. After being rejected, Rhodes shows Kruger a long list of members of the Boer council who work for the British. Kruger then becomes convinced that the Boers must fight if they are to keep their land, and he declares war against Britain and starts the Second Boer War.

Initially, the Boers are in the ascendancy, with the Boers defeating the British at the Battle of Ladysmith and Magersfontein. Britain subsequently replaces Redvers Buller and Lord Roberts, appointing Lord Kitchener as Supreme Commander of the armed forces. Kitchener launches an attack on the civilian population by destroying its homes, using human shields and placing the women and children in concentration camps in an attempt to damage the morale of the Boer Army.

Kruger's son Jan, who has pro-British sentiments because of his Oxford education, visits a concentration camp to find his wife, Petra, and is caught and hanged with his wife watching. When the women respond in anger, they are massacred.

The flashback concludes in the Geneva hotel room. Before death, Kruger prophesies the destruction of Britain by major powers of the world.

== Cast ==
- Emil Jannings : Paul Krüger
- Lucie Höflich : Sanna Krüger
- Werner Hinz : Jan Krüger
- Gisela Uhlen : Petra Krüger
- Ernst Schröder : Adrian Krüger
- Elisabeth Flickenschildt : Miss Kock
- Walter Werner : MP Kock
- Fritz Hoopts : Colson
- Ferdinand Marian : Cecil Rhodes
- Gustaf Gründgens : Joseph Chamberlain
- Eduard von Winterstein : Commandant Cronje
- Hans Adalbert Schlettow : Commandant De Wett
- Friedrich Ulmer : General Joubert
- Hedwig Wangel : Queen Victoria
- Paul Bildt : Dutch Foreign Minister
- Franz Schafheitlin : Lord Kitchener
- Harald Paulsen : French Foreign Minister
- Otto Graf : German Foreign Minister
- Otto Wernicke : British concentration camp commandant
- Gerhard Bienert : Brown
- Josef Dahmen : British Soldier
- Karl Martell : British Officer
- Jack Trevor : British Officer
- Walther Süssenguth : Sergeant
- Max Gülstorff : Francis William Reitz
- Lewis Brody : Lobenguela
- Flockina von Platen : Flora Shaw
- Karl Haubenreißer : Dr. Leander Jameson
- Alfred Bernau : Edward, Prince of Wales

== Propaganda message ==
Ohm Krüger was one of a number of anti-British propaganda feature films produced by the Nazis during the war, most of which focused on countries with troubled relations with Britain to show the "true British character" such as in South Africa and Ireland. Some of the productions, such as The Fox of Glenarvon (1940) and My Life for Ireland (1941), represented British relations with Ireland. Other works focused on the Second Boer War, most notably Ohm Krüger. It used the Boer War to present the British as violent and exploitative and as an enemy to civilisation. In doing so, it complemented the anglophobic views of the press, appealed to the German public's interest in regaining former German colonies and built upon Anglophobia in Germany that had grown with RAF bombing raids on German targets. It was one of a number of films intended to prepare Germany for a planned invasion of Britain. Its somewhat crude attack on Britain is typical of later films, such as Carl Peters, after Hitler had come to the conclusion that no separate peace with Britain was possible. It depicts the British as seeking gold, symbolic of barrenness and evil, in contrast to the Boers, who raised crops and animals.

Publicity material which accompanied the film particularly drew attention to the role of Winston Churchill in the Boer War during which he served as a journalist. Tobis also advised the press to emphasise "what Churchill learnt in the Boer War":

'The same Churchill who in South Africa saw his ideas about exterminating the Boers followed throughout, as the English rulers, voicing polished humanitarian slogans, while driven by mere greed, unleashed the most contemptible actions on a people under attack. [T]he same Churchill is now Albion's prime minister.

British concentration camps were portrayed in the film as intentionally inhumane. Meanwhile, major expansion of the German system of concentration camps was being implemented.

Parallels were drawn between the Boer War and the Second World War, and between Paul Krüger and Adolf Hitler.

Key British figures are demonised in the film, including Joseph Chamberlain and the Prince of Wales (later Edward VII). Queen Victoria is presented as a drunkard, and the British concentration camp commandant, responsible for the killing of female inmates, resembles Churchill.

The film also reflects German anger at the loss of all German colonies at the end of World War I though less directly than Carl Peters.

== Production ==
The first outline for Ohm Krüger was begun in September 1940 by Hans Steinhoff and Harald Bratt. The film had very high production costs of 5.477 million ℛℳ (equivalent to $23,513,098 in 2021) to produce. At the time, Joseph Goebbels had been encouraging film-makers to have lower production costs, but he made an exception for Ohm Krüger, declaring it to be reichswichtig (important for the State) due to its propagandistic and artistic value; in his Diaries Goebbels - at the "first showing of the completed Ohm Krüger" at his house - wrote: "Great excitement. The film is unique. A really big hit. Everyone is thrilled by it. Jannings has excelled himself. An anti-England film beyond one's wildest dreams. Gauleiter Eigruber is also present and very enthusiastic". The production used 4000 horses, about 200 oxen, 180 ox wagons, 25,000 soldiers and 9000 women.

== Reception ==
Directives were issued to the press by the Reich Ministry of Public Enlightenment and Propaganda (RMVP) about how to cover the film. They were instructed to draw attention to the significance of the film, but to emphasise its aesthetic rather than its political content.

The film was approved by the censors on 2 April 1941, and premiered on 4 April. It was well-received, attracting a quarter of a million viewers in four days upon its initial release, largely as a result of the high expectations generated by the propaganda press campaign, with word-of-mouth recommendations also being important in the film's popularity. It earned 5.5 million ℛℳ (equivalent to $23,611,838 in 2021) at the box office for a loss of 801,000 ℛℳ (equivalent to $3,438,742 in 2021).

The Sicherheitsdienst (SD; Nazi intelligence service) reported that the film exceeded expectations, with audiences particularly praising the 'unity of political conviction, artistic expression and acting performances'. The public were also reportedly impressed by the fact that a film of Ohm Krüger's quality could be produced in wartime. The film was particularly popular with young audiences, according to both SD reports and film surveys.

Some, however, did question the authenticity of the film.

Internationally, the film was officially released in only eight independent states (including Italy), all of which were closely linked to Nazi Germany, and in France (first in the occupied zone, later also in Vichy France).

=== Awards and honours ===
Ohm Krüger won the Mussolini Cup for best foreign film at the 1941 Venice Film Festival, at which the Italian Minister for Popular Culture, Alessandro Pavolini, praised particularly the film's propaganda value and the role of Emil Jannings.

Within Germany, the film was the first to be given the honorary distinction 'Film of the Nation' (Film der Nation) by the Reich Propaganda Ministry Censorship Office. Only three other films received this rating, namely Heimkehr (1941), The Great King (1942) and Die Entlassung (1942). Joseph Goebbels also presented Emil Jannings with the 'Ring of Honour of the German Cinema'.

=== Re-release ===
The success of the film led Goebbels to re-release it in October 1944, as inspiration for the Volkssturm. On 31 January 1945, the film was banned, for fear that the morale of German audiences would be harmed by images of Boer refugees whose houses had been destroyed - 'images that by the time replicated the harsh realities of everyday life in Germany'.

== Works cited ==
- Noack, Frank (2016) [2000]. Veit Harlan: "des Teufels Regisser" [Veit Harlan: The Life and Work of a Nazi Filmmaker]. Lexinton: University Press of Kentucky. ISBN 9780813167008.
- Welch, David (1983). Propaganda and the German Cinema: 1933-1945. I.B. Tauris. ISBN 9781860645204.

== Bibliography ==
- Fox, Jo, Film Propaganda in Britain and Nazi Germany
- Hake, Sabine, German National Cinema
- Hallstein, C.W., 'Ohm Kruger: The Genesis of a Nazi Propaganda Film', Literature Film Quarterly (2002)
- Klotz, M, 'Epistemological ambiguity and the fascist text: Jew Süss, Carl Peters, and Ohm Krüger', New German Critique, 74 (1998)
- Taylor, Richard, Film Propaganda: Soviet Russia and Nazi Germany
- Vande Winkel, R, 'Ohm Krüger's Travels: a Case Study in the Export of Third-Reich Film Propaganda', Historical Reflections / Réflexions Historiques, 35:2 (2009), pp. 108–124.
- Welch, David, Propaganda and the German Cinema, 1939-1945
