= The Immortal Heart =

1939 film

- Directed by: Veit Harlan
- Written by: Richard Billinger; Werner Eplinius; Veit Harlan; Walter Harlan
- Produced by: Gerhard Staab
- Starring: Heinrich George
- Cinematography: Bruno Mondi
- Release date: 20 October 1939
- Running time: 107 minutes
- Country: Nazi Germany
- Language: German
- Budget: 1,750,000 ℛℳ (equivalent to €7,784,469 in 2021)
- Box office: 2,500,000 ℛℳ (equivalent to €11,120,670 in 2021)

The Immortal Heart (German: Das Unsterbliche Herz) is a 1939 German drama film directed by Veit Harlan and starring Heinrich George. It was based on Walter Harlan's play The Nuremberg Egg and depicts the inventor of the watch, Peter Henlein.

== Cast ==
- Heinrich George as Peter Henlein
- Kristina Söderbaum as Ev
- Paul Wegener as Dr. Schedel
- Raimund Schelcher as Konrad Windhalm
- Michael Bohnen as Martin Behaim
- Paul Henckels as Güldenbeck
- Ernst Legal as Bader Bratvogel
- Eduard von Winterstein as Richter Sixtus Heith
- Franz Schafheitlin as Burghauptmann Zinderl
- Jakob Tiedtke as Schöffe Weihrauch

== Production ==
Production began in July 1938. To recreate Nuremberg as it looked in 1517, the streets were covered with sand and other demodernization took place. 500 Sturmabteilung horsemen took part in medieval costumes. Harlan and Propaganda Minister Joseph Goebbels concurred on some cuts to the finished film.
