= Battle Squadron Lützow =

1941 film

- Directed by: Hans Bertram
- Written by: Hans Bertram; Wolf Neumeister; Heinz Orlovius; Hanns Steinkopf
- Produced by: Hans Bertram; Robert Wüllner
- Starring: Christian Kayßler; Hermann Braun; Heinz Welzel
- Cinematography: Georg Krause; Walter Roßkopf; Heinz von Jaworsky
- Edited by: Ella Ensink
- Music by: Norbert Schultze
- Production company: Tobis Film
- Distributed by: Tobis FIlm
- Release date: 28 February 1941
- Running time: 97 minutes
- Country: Germany
- Language: German

Battle Squadron Lützow (German: Kampfgeschwader Lützow) is a 1941 German war film directed by Hans Bertram and starring Christian Kayßler, Hermann Braun and Heinz Welzel. It was shot at the Johannisthal Studios in Berlin and on location in German-occupied Poland. The film's sets were designed by the art directors Franz Bi and Otto Moldenhauer. it functions as a sequel to the 1939 film D III 88. It was produced as a propaganda film by Tobis Film to support the German war effort during the Second World War. Because of its pro-Nazi content it was banned by the Allied authorities in 1945.

== Synopsis ==
The men of a German bomber squadron, named after the Prussian leader of the Napoleonic Wars Ludwig Adolf Wilhelm von Lützow, are ordered to take part in the Invasion of Poland in 1939. They rescue some ethnic Germans from a Polish attack, and two members of the squadron fall for Grete a young woman they have saved. They then proceed to the Battle of France, another decisive victory. They end the film launching their first bombing mission again England in the Battle of Britain.

== Cast ==
- Christian Kayßler as Oberst Mithoff
- Hermann Braun as Unteroffizier Eckhard
- Heinz Welzel as Unteroffizier Paulsen
- Hannes Keppler as Unteroffizier Guggemos
- Marietheres Angerpointner as Grethe Kubath
- Carsta Löck as Lina Zeistler
- Adolf Fischer as Unteroffizier Zeistler
- Horst Birr as Obergefreiter Hasinger
- Peter Voß as Major Hagen
- Helmut von Hofe as Gefreiter Hellwig
- Hans Bergmann as Unteroffizier Richards
- O.K. Kinne as Oberleutnant Körner
- Curt Pflug as Gefreiter Christoff
- Horst Rossius as Hans Kubath
- Ernst Stimmel as Lehrer Lehwald
- Rudolf Vones as Hauptmann Pebal

== Bibliography ==
- Farmer, James H. Celluloid Wings. Tab Books, 1984.
- Hoffmann, Hilmar. The Triumph of Propaganda: Film and National Socialism, 1933–1945. Berghahn Books, 1997
- Jeavons, Clyde. A Pictorial History of War Films. Citadel Press, 1974.
