= The Dismissal (film) =

1942 film

- Directed by: Wolfgang Liebeneiner
- Written by: Alexander Lernet-Holenia (story); Curt J. Braun; Felix von Eckardt
- Produced by: Emil Jannings (producer); Fritz Klotsch (line producer); Walter Lehmann (executive producer)
- Starring: See below
- Cinematography: Fritz Arno Wagner
- Edited by: Martha Dübber
- Music by: Herbert Windt
- Release date: 6 October 1942
- Running time: 110 minutes; 100 minutes (West Germany cut version)
- Country: Nazi Germany
- Language: German
- Budget: 3.6 million ℛℳ
- Box office: 6.5 million ℛℳ

The Dismissal (German: Die Entlassung) is a 1942 German film directed by Wolfgang Liebeneiner about the dismissal of Otto von Bismarck. It was one of only five films to receive the honorary distinction "Film of the Nation" by the Reich Propaganda Ministry Censorship Office.

== Plot ==
The film shows the events leading up to Bismarck being dismissed by Kaiser Wilhelm II and the dilettantes who surround him. An unscrupulous schemer plays on the king's desire to lead and so persuades him to dismiss his chancellor. This results in a disastrous two-front war by destroying Bismarck's treaty with Russia and leaving him to lament with the question of who would complete his work.

The film ends with a postscript stating that Germany's misfortunes from 1890 to 1933 were the result of Bismarck's dismissal and that a nation's fate depends on its personalities, not its institutions.

== Cast ==
- Emil Jannings as Prince Bismarck
- Margarete Schön as Princess Johanna Bismarck
- Christian Kayßler as Count Herbert Bismarck
- Theodor Loos as Kaiser Wilhelm I
- Karl Ludwig Diehl as Kaiser Friedrich III
- Hildegard Grethe as Empress Frederick
- Werner Hinz as Kaiser Wilhelm II
- Werner Krauss as Privy Councillor von Holstein
- Otto Graf as Count Eulenburg
- Paul Hoffmann as Count Waldersee
- Paul Bildt as Minister von Bötticher
- Walther Süssenguth as Tsar Alexander
- Franz Schafheitlin as Ambassador Count Schuvalov
- Herbert Hübner as General Adjutant von Hahnke
- Rudolf Blümner as Chef Of Civil Cabinet Hermann von Lucanus
- Fritz Kampers as Professor Dr. Schwenninger
- Emil Heß as Grand Duke Vladimir
- Heinrich Schroth as General von Caprivi

== Production ==
The success of Bismarck led to the creation of a sequel. The Dismissal cost 3.6 million ℛℳ (equivalent to $15,000,000 in 2021) to produce.

== Release ==
The Dismissal was first shown in the small town of Stettin on 15 September 1942, to gauge whether the film should receive a general release. Alfred Rosenberg reported that the film should not be released as it gave the impression of German war guilt, it could aid Allied propaganda, and that it reminded the German people of Wilhelm's policies. However, the film was released as Joseph Goebbels viewed it as "a brilliant success".

The film was approved by the censors on 28 August, and premiered in Berlin on 6 October. The war with Russia delayed its release, and it was not exported, owing to the obvious parallels. Ulrich von Hassell felt that the film was anti-monarchist. It earned 6.5 million ℛℳ (equivalent to $27,000,000 in 2021) at the box office for a profit of 2,081,000 ℛℳ (equivalent to $8,720,000 in 2021).

== Works cited ==
- Hake, Sabine (2002). German National Cinema. London: Routledge. ISBN 978-0-415-08901-2.
- Hertzstein, Robert Edwin (1978). The War That Hitler Won. New York: Putnam. ISBN 978-0-399-11845-6.
- Welch, David (1983). Propaganda and the German Cinema: 1933-1945. I.B. Tauris. ISBN 9781860645204.
