= Unternehmen Michael =

- Directed by: Karl Ritter
- Screenplay by: Karl Ritter; Mathias Wieman; Fred Hildenbrandt
- Based on: Frühlingsschlacht by Hans Fritz von Zwehl
- Produced by: Karl Ritter
- Starring: Heinrich George; Mathias Wieman; Willy Birgel; Hannes Stelzer; Paul Otto; Otto Graf; Christian Kayßler
- Cinematography: Günther Anders
- Edited by: Gottfried Ritter
- Music by: Herbert Windt
- Production company: UFA
- Release date: 7 September 1937
- Country: Germany
- Language: German

Unternehmen Michael (Operation Michael or The Michael Action; English title The Private's Job) is a 1937 German film directed by Karl Ritter, the first of three films about the First World War which he made during the period when the Third Reich was rearming.

== Plot summary ==
The film is set in the First World War and is based on a 1932 play by Hans Fritz von Zwehl (Frühlingsschlacht, 'Spring Battle', originally also titled Unternehmen Michael) about the German offensive Operation Michael during the First World War, which was launched on 21 March 1918. The British are in possession of the village of Beaurevoir. The Germans plan to send in assault troops to take the village, but their commanding officer, Captain Hill, is injured the night before. A desk officer, Major zur Linden (Mathias Wieman), volunteers to lead the mission. The unit succeed but find themselves surrounded by the enemy. They discuss their options and Major zur Linden's advocacy of a heroic death for the sake of their country wins out over the defeatist and the traditional military pragmatist; the Germans declare a ceasefire and then the commanding general, in full knowledge, gives the order for their artillery to bombard the village as the British are storming it, thereby sacrificing their own men in order to kill the enemy. The sacrifice is not in vain; it enables the Germans to push forward to the British fortress, the 'Labyrinth'.

== Cast ==
- Heinrich George as Commanding General
- Mathias Wieman as Major zur Linden
- Willy Birgel as Major Graf Schellenberg
- Hannes Stelzer as Lieutenant Prinz Erxburg
- Heinz Welzel as Lieutenant von Treskow
- Paul Otto as Lieutenant Colonel Hegenau
- Ernst Karchow as Captain Noack
- Otto Wernicke as Colonel Berg
- Christian Kayßler as Cavalry Captain von Wengern
- Kurt Waitzmann as First Lieutenant Weber
- Malte Jäger as 2nd company commander
- Beppo Brem as Private Kollermann
- Josef Dahmen as a defeatist
- Josef Renner as Captain Hill
- Jim Simmons as Lieutenant Mertens
- Carl John as Lieutenant Hassenkamp
- Otto Graf as Captain von Groth
- Otto Krone as 1st company commander
- Friedrich Berger as Non-Commissioned Officer Henke
- Adolf Fischer as combat orderly
- Lutz Götz as Musketeer Raspe
- Paul Schwed as Non-Commissioned Officer of Staff Guard
- Arthur Wiesner as homing pigeon keeper
- Hans Bergmann as assault trooper
- Franz Ernst Bochum as old Frenchman
- Elsa Wagner as old Frenchwoman
- Otz Tollen as infantry battalion commander
- Max Hiller as English prisoner

== Production and themes ==
Shooting took place between 12 May and late June 1937, with interiors shot at the UFA studios in Neubabelsberg.

Unternehmen Michael is the first of three 'soldier films' set during the First World War which Ritter made in 1936–38, when Nazi Germany was rearming in preparation for renewed war. Ritter himself described his war films as "pictorial armo[u]red car[s]", in contrast to entertainment films. It was a Staatsauftragsfilm; it was commissioned by the Ministry of Propaganda. It is representative of the glorification in Nazi Germany of the heroic death (Heldentod). As the general tells the major in charge of the assault unit: "Posterity will remember us not by the greatness of our victory but by the measure of our sacrifice!" Thousands of men are sacrificed over a ruined village of little strategic value.

== Release ==
The film premièred on 7 September 1937 at the Ufa-Palast in Nuremberg during the 9th Nazi Party rally and in Berlin at the Ufa-Palast am Zoo on 19 November 1937. It was shown the following year in the United States.

== Reception ==
Officers of the Wehrmacht objected to the suicidal message of the film. The director, Karl Ritter, responded by saying, "I want to show the German youth that senseless, sacrificed death has its moral value." Carl Bloem, a retired military officer who had published popular novels, was asked to rebut the film's point of view and did so in a radio play in which the pragmatic view won out amongst the soldiers: "No German commanding officer has the right or duty to destroy uselessly the lives of German soldiers." The company raise the white flag of surrender. This was broadcast on the Cologne radio station, but the Ministry of Propaganda disavowed it, with the statement, "Our film has the purpose of showing the younger generation of today the real spirit of the German soldier during the offensive at the western front in 1918." The film was awarded the Prädikat (distinction) of staatspolitisch besonders wertvoll (particular political value).

The New York Times, however, saw the film as "not emphasiz[ing]" the horrors of war.

The film is classified by the Friedrich Wilhelm Murnau Foundation as a Vorbehaltsfilm (conditional film), meaning it can only be shown in Germany under restricted conditions for educational purposes.
