= I Accuse (1941 film) =

1941 film

- Directed by: Wolfgang Liebeneiner
- Written by: Harald Bratt; Eberhard Frowein; Wolfgang Liebeneiner
- Based on: Sendung und Gewissen by Hellmuth Unger
- Produced by: Heinrich Jonen
- Starring: Heidemarie Hatheyer; Paul Hartmann; Mathias Wieman; Christian Kayßler; Hans Nielsen; Harald Paulsen; Charlotte Thiele; Albert Florath
- Cinematography: Friedl Behn-Grund
- Edited by: Walter von Bonhorst
- Music by: Norbert Schultze
- Production company: Tobis Filmkunst
- Release date: 29 August 1941
- Running time: 125 min
- Country: Nazi Germany
- Language: German
- Budget: 960,000 ℛℳ
- Box office: 5.4 million ℛℳ

I Accuse (German: Ich klage an ([ˈʔɪç ˈklaːɡə ʔan]) is a 1941 Nazi German pro-euthanasia propaganda film directed by Wolfgang Liebeneiner and produced by Heinrich Jonen and Ewald von Demandowsky. It was developed to promote the involuntary euthanasia of disabled people conducted through the Aktion T4 mass murder program and to garner public support for the Nazi concept of life unworthy of life.

== Plot ==
Hanna, a talented young pianist, is diagnosed with late stage multiple sclerosis. Unable to continue her career, losing all her motor functions, and in constant agonizing pain, she asks her doctors to end her life. Hanna's husband Thomas, a doctor, reluctantly gives her a fatal overdose of barbiturates and is charged with murder. During an extended trial scene, arguments are put forth for and against euthanasia, heavily favoring the position that prolonging a disabled person’s life is sometimes contrary to nature, and that death is a patient's right as well as a doctor's moral duty. In the closing scene, Thomas lashes out at the judge and prosecutor, telling them they have no right to condemn him when they were not the ones forced to helplessly watch a loved one suffer in pain. He accuses the lawmakers of cruelty for failing to prevent patients' suffering through necessary euthanasia.

== Cast ==
- Paul Hartmann as Professor Thomas Heyt
- Heidemarie Hatheyer as Hanna Heyt
- Mathias Wieman as Bernhard Lang
- Margarete Haagen as Berta Link
- Charlotte Thiele as Barbara Burckhardt
- Christian Kayßler as Judge Kriebelmeyer
- Harald Paulsen as Eduard Stretter
- Albert Florath as Prof. Schlüter
- Ilse Fürstenberg as Marie Günther
- Karin Evans as Erna Balg
- Hans Nielsen as Dr. Höfer
- Franz Schafheitlin as Straten
- Erich Ponto as Prof. Werther
- Otto Graf as Prosecutor Engel
- Leopold von Ledebur as Magistrate Knevels
- Hansi Arnstaedt as Mrs Klapper
- Just Scheu as Doctor Scheu
- Paul Rehkopf as Court Officer
- Karl Haubenreißer as Schönbrunn

== Production ==
Prior propaganda short films, such as Abseit vom Wege (By the Wayside) and Erbkrank (Congenitally Ill), were made in support of the Nazi's euthanasia policies, but were meant for ideological education and not for public release. Victor Brack convinced Tobis Filmkunst to produce a film about euthanasia after a public backlash to the policies. Wolfgang Liebeneiner, who directed the film, stated that it was meant to test public opinion on legalizing euthanasia. It cost 960,000 ℛℳ (equivalent to $4,121,339 in 2021).

This film was commissioned by Nazi propaganda minister Joseph Goebbels at the suggestion of Dr. Karl Brandt, to bolster public support for the Aktion T4 euthanasia program. Key scenes from the film were personally inserted by Brack, one of the prominent organisers of the program and later a convicted war criminal. The actual victims of T4 were in fact killed without their consent, or that of their families. Indeed, one cinema goer is alleged to have compared the film to the program and naively asked how abuses could be prevented from creeping into it.

Heidemarie Hatheyer was banned from acting by the Allied occupation, but she resumed her career in 1949 and won numerous high-profile awards before her death. Liebeneiner was put on trial in 1964 as an accessory to mass murder for directing the film.

== Reception ==
The film was approved by censors without any edits on 15 August 1941, and premiered in Berlin on 29 August. Over 18 million people watched the film and it earned 5.4 million ℛℳ (equivalent to $23,182,532 in 2021) for a profit of 3,641,000 ℛℳ (equivalent to $15,631,037 in 2021). It was banned by Allied powers after the war.

The SS reported that the churches were uniformly negative about the movie, with Catholics expressing it more strongly but Protestants being equally negative. Opinions in medical circles were positive, though there were doubts, especially though not exclusively in cases where patients thought to be incurable had recovered. Legal professions were anxious that it be placed on a legal footing, and in the few polls that were commissioned, the general population were said to be supportive.

== Works cited ==
- Waldman, Harry (2008). Nazi Films In America, 1933-1942. McFarland & Company. ISBN 9780786438617.
- Welch, David (1983). Propaganda and the German Cinema: 1933-1945. I.B. Tauris. ISBN 9781860645204.

== Bibliography ==
- Ayçoberry, Pierre (1981). The Nazi Question: An Essay on the Interpretations of National Socialism (1922–1975). New York: Pantheon Books. ISBN 978-0-394-74841-2.
- Grunberger, Richard (1971). The 12-Year Reich: A Social History of Nazi Germany, 1933–1945. New York: Holt, Rinehart and Winston. ISBN 978-0-03-076435-6.
- Hertzstein, Robert Edwin (1978). The War That Hitler Won. New York: Putnam. ISBN 978-0-399-11845-6.
- Leiser, Erwin (1975). Nazi Cinema. New York: Macmillan. ISBN 978-0-02-570230-1.
- Romani, Cinzia (1992). Tainted Goddesses: Female Film Stars of the Third Reich. New York: Sarpedon. ISBN 978-0-9627613-1-7.
