= Pour le Mérite (film) =

- Film poster
- Directed by: Karl Ritter
- Written by: Fred Hildenbrandt; Karl Ritter
- Produced by: Karl Ritter
- Starring: Paul Hartmann; Herbert A.E. Böhme; Albert Hehn; Paul Otto; Fritz Kampers
- Cinematography: Günther Anders; Heinz von Jaworsky (aerial photography)
- Edited by: Gottfried Ritter
- Music by: Herbert Windt; Otto Dobrindt (music editor)
- Production company: Universum Film (UFA)
- Distributed by: Ufa Film Company (USA)
- Release date: 22 December 1938; (Germany)
- Running time: 121 minutes
- Country: Germany
- Language: Silent (English intertitles)
- Budget: 1.076 million ℛℳ
- Box office: 3.7 million ℛℳ

Pour le Mérite (original title in French, lit. For Merit) is a 1938 propaganda film produced and directed by Karl Ritter for Nazi Germany. (Note: Karl Ritter had been a fighter pilot in World War I.) The film follows the story of officers of the Luftstreitkräfte (German Air Force) in the First World War who were later involved in the formation of the Luftwaffe. Pour le Mérite propagates the "stab legend", which blames the German military defeat in World War I on an alleged treason in the homeland. At the same time, Ritter also glorifies the former fighter pilots as heroes of National Socialism.

== Plot ==
In 1918, the German pilot Lieutenant Fabian and his fiancée Gerda learn that he has been awarded the Order of Pour le Mérite ("The Blue Max"), Germany's highest award for valor. The next morning, Fabian and Jagdgeschwader 1 (the "Flying Circus" of Manfred von Richthofen) are ordered back to the front.

On the Western Front, Fabian and other officers of the squadron continue the aerial fight. Their commanding officer, Captain Prank, returns from homeland with the news that a revolution has broken out in Germany. Prank and his men fly their aircraft back to Germany, but the squadron becomes involved in disputes with local workers and soldiers. With the squadron's aircraft destroyed, the pilots and the crew surrender, and only Moebius seemingly disapproves.

The former officers successfully find postwar work in civilian occupations, but Prank cannot cope. Moebius suddenly reappears and takes Prank and his wife, Isabel, to his estate, where Moebius has hidden his former warplane. He plans to start a flying school, but a communist group attacks, and his aircraft is destroyed. During the attack, Isabel is killed. Prank is arrested, and when Moebius fails in a rescue attempt, an embittered Prank serves out his sentence and then goes abroad.

After 1933, a wave of National Socialism flows in Germany with the Nazi regime attracting the discontented former officers of Jagdgeschwader 1, all of whom hold the coveted Pour le Mérite award. They have continued to keep in touch and developed a strong camaraderie. At one point, the men take to the streets to fight the communists and are arrested.

In 1935, Nazi Germany restores a new Luftwaffe and invites former officers to return. Fabian, Gerdes and Moebius convince Prank to come back to Germany, where the latter gets appointed as the commanding officer of a new fighter squadron.

Reichsmarschall Hermann Göring, a former commander of Jagdgeschwader 1, visits the squadron as it equips with the new Messerschmitt Bf 109 fighter aircraft.

== Cast ==
- Paul Hartmann as Captain Prank
- Herbert A.E. Böhme as Gerdes
- Albert Hehn as Lt. Fabian
- Paul Otto as Maj. Wissmann
- Fritz Kampers as Moebius
- Josef Dahmen as surcharge
- Willi Rose as frill
- Carsta Löck as Gerda Fabian
- Jutta Freybe as Isabel Prank
- Gisela von Collande as Anna Moebius
- Marina von Ditmar as Young Frenchwoman
- Otz Tollen as Capt. Reinwald
- Theo Shall as Capt. Cecil Wood
- Wolfgang Staudte as Lt. Ellermann
- Clemens Hasse as lancer
- Walter Bluhm as hussar
- Heinz Engelmann as cuirassier

== Production ==
Pour le Mérite was produced and distributed by the UFA. Karl Ritter directed and co-write the film with Fred Hildenbrandt. It cost 1,076,000 ℛℳ (equivalent to $4,805,498 in 2021) to produce.

== Release ==
The film was approved by the censors on 7 December 1938, and premiered on 22 December. It earned 3.7 million ℛℳ (equivalent to $16,524,484 in 2021) at the box office for a profit of 1,937,000 ℛℳ (equivalent to $8,120,766 in 2021).

After the end of the Second World War, the High Command of the Allied victorious powers prohibited the screening of Pour le Mérite. Today, the evaluation rights are held by the Friedrich Wilhelm Murnau Foundation, which sanctions the screening of the film only in the context of special educational events.

== Reception ==
Aviation film historian Bertil Skogsberg in Wings on the Screen: A Pictorial History of Air Movies (1987) characterized Pour le Mérite as "... notwithstanding its palpably Nazi undertones, can be regarded as a technically good film about flying." Further, he stated, "The film was permeated with patriotic fervor and, in spite of the glorification of the Nazi cause, it compelled the spectator's attention. Paul Hartmann was magnificent as the squadron leader, and he received much assistance from the other "flyers", Albert Hehn, Fritz Kampers and Herbert A.E. Böhme."

== Works cited ==
- Welch, David (1983). Propaganda and the German Cinema: 1933-1945. I.B. Tauris. ISBN 9781860645204.

== Bibliography ==
- Farmer, James H. Celluloid Wings: The Impact of Movies on Aviation. Blue Ridge Summit, Pennsylvania: Tab Books Inc., 1984. ISBN 978-0-83062-374-7.
- Leiser, Erwin. Germany Awake!: Propaganda in Third Reich Films. Hamburg: Rowohlt, Reinbek, 1976. ISBN 978-3-49910-783-2.
- Paris, Michael. From the Wright Brothers to Top Gun: Aviation, Nationalism, and Popular Cinema. Manchester, UK: Manchester University Press, 1995. ISBN 978-0-7190-4074-0.
- Pendo, Stephen. Aviation in the Cinema. Lanham, Maryland: Scarecrow Press, 1985. ISBN 0-8-1081-746-2.
- Skogsberg, Bertil. Wings on the Screen: A Pictorial History of Air Movies. London: Tantivy Press, 1987. ISBN 0-498-02495-4.
