= Jud Süß (disambiguation) =

Jud Süß is a 1940 antisemitic Nazi German propaganda film.

Jud Süß or variants may also refer to:

- Jud Süß (Hauff novel), an 1827 novella by Wilhelm Hauff about Joseph Süß Oppenheimer
- Jud Süß (Feuchtwanger novel), a 1925 novel by Lion Feuchtwanger about Joseph Süß Oppenheimer
  - Jew Süss (1934 film), a British film based on Feuchtwanger's novel
- Jew Suss: Rise and Fall, a 2010 German historical drama film dramatising the creative process behind the 1940 film
- Jud Süß, a 1930 play by Paul Kornfeld
- Joseph Süß Oppenheimer (1698–1738), German Jewish banker and court Jew for Duke Karl Alexander of Württemberg, subject of several creative works

== See also ==
- Jud (disambiguation)
- Süß, a surname page
