= Suess =

Suess may refer to:

- Süß, a German surname transliterated as Suess
- C. J. Suess (born 1994), American hockey player
- Eduard Suess (1831–1914), an Austrian geologist
  - Mount Suess, a mountain in Antarctica named for the geologist
  - Suess (lunar crater), named for the geologist
  - Suess (Martian crater), named for the geologist
  - Suess Glacier, a glacier in Canada named for the geologist
  - Suess Land, in Greenland named for the geologist
  - 12002 Suess, asteroid named for his son Franz Eduard
- Hans Suess (1909–1993), an Austrian born American physical chemist, nuclear physicist and grandson of the geologist Eduard Suess
  - Suess cycle, a cycle present in radiocarbon proxies of solar activity
  - Suess effect, a change in the ratio of the atmospheric concentrations of heavy isotopes of carbon noted by the chemist
- Hans Suess, known as Hans von Kulmbach, 16th century German artist
- Randy Suess (1945–2019), American programmer, co-founder of CBBS, the first bulletin board system
- Ray Suess (1903–1970), American football player
- Suess., the author abbreviation of German botanist Karl Suessenguth (1893–1955)

== See also ==
- Allen Suess Whiting (1926–2018), American political scientist
- Seuss (surname)
- Suss (disambiguation)
- Sues (disambiguation)
