= The Rothschilds (film) =

1940 Nazi German propaganda film directed by Erich Waschneck

- Directed by: Erich Waschneck
- Written by: Gerhard T. Buchholz; Mirko Jelusich; C.M. Köhn
- Produced by: C.M. Köhn (line producer)
- Starring: See below
- Cinematography: Robert Baberske
- Edited by: Walter Wischniewsky
- Music by: Johannes Müller
- Production company: UFA
- Distributed by: UFA
- Release date: 17 July 1940
- Running time: 97 minutes
- Country: Nazi Germany
- Language: German
- Budget: 951,000 ℛℳ
- Box office: 2.5 million ℛℳ

The Rothschilds (Die Rothschilds) is a 1940 Nazi German historical propaganda film directed by Erich Waschneck.

The film is also known as The Rothschilds' Shares in Waterloo (International recut version, English title). It portrays the role of the Rothschild family in the Napoleonic Wars. The Jewish Rothschilds are depicted in a negative manner, consistent with the antisemitic policy of Nazi Germany. The 1940 film has a similar title and a similar plot to a 1934 American film, The House of Rothschild, starring George Arliss and Boris Karloff, that presented the Rothschilds in a more positive light. It is one of three Nazi-era German films that provide an antisemitic retelling of an earlier film. The others, both released in 1940, bore titles similar to films released in 1934: The Eternal Jew was a documentary-format film with the same title as the 1934 film, and Jud Süss was a drama based on the 1934 film adaptation of the 1925 novel.

== Plot ==
As William I, Elector of Hesse refused to join the French supporting Confederation of the Rhine at its formation in 1806, he is threatened by Napoleon. In Frankfurt, he asks his agent Mayer Amschel Rothschild to convey bonds worth £600,000 he has received from Britain to subsidise his army to safety in England.

Rothschild however uses the money for his own ends, with the help of his sons, Nathan Rothschild in London and James Rothschild in Paris. They first use the money to finance Wellington's army in Spain's war against Napoleon, at advantageous terms of interest. In a notable coup, in 1815, Nathan spreads the rumour that Napoleon had won the Battle of Waterloo, causing London stock prices to collapse. He then bought a large quantity of equities at the bottom of the market, profiting handsomely as prices rose once the truth about the battle emerged. In a decade, the Rothschilds have accumulated a fortune of £11 million by using the Elector's money.

Nathan returns the original capital to the Elector, plus only a small amount of interest, keeping the great bulk of the profits for the Rothschilds, and plans to formalise a Europe wide network of family led financial institutions.

The film ends with a declaration that, as the film is released, the last Rothschild has left continental Europe as a refugee and the next target is England's plutocracy.

== Cast ==
- Erich Ponto as Mayer Amschel Rothschild
- Carl Kuhlmann as Nathan Rothschild
- Herbert Hübner as Anthony Turner
- Albert Florath as Baring
- Hans Stiebner as Bronstein
- Walter Franck as Herries
- Waldemar Leitgeb as Wellington
- Hans Leibelt as King Louis XVIII
- Bernhard Minetti as Fouché
- Albert Lippert as James Rothschild
- Herbert Wilk as George Crayton
- Hilde Weissner as Sylvia Turner
- Ludwig Linkmann as Leib Herch
- Bruno Hübner as Ruthworth
- Rudolf Carl as Rubiner
- Michael Bohnen as Prince William IX
- Herbert Gernot as Clifford
- Theo Shall as Selfridge
- Ursula Deinert as Harriet
- Hubert von Meyerinck as Baron Vitrolles

== Production ==
The Nazis had hoped for a surge in antisemitic sentiment after Kristallnacht but, when it became clear that most Germans did not share such views, Goebbels ordered each studio to make an antisemitic film. While Hitler preferred presenting this agenda directly in films such as Der ewige Jude (The Eternal Jew), Goebbels preferred a more subtle approach of couching such messages in an engaging story with popular appeal.

Joseph Goebbels ordered the beginning of the production on 17 November 1938. C.M. Köhn and Gerhard T. Buchholz wrote a script based on an idea by Mirko Jelusich. It cost 951,000 ℛℳ (equivalent to $4,000,000 in 2021) to produce.

Saul Friedländer suggests that Goebbels' intent was to counter three films whose messages attacked the persecution of Jews throughout history by producing violently antisemitic versions of those films with identical titles.

== Release ==
The film was approved by the censors on 16 July 1940, and premiered in Berlin on 17 July. It received a limited release before being re-edited and renamed The Rothschilds' Shares in Waterloo. This version was released 2 July 1941. It earned 2.5 million ℛℳ (equivalent to $11,000,000 in 2021) at the box office for a profit of 1.093 million ℛℳ (equivalent to $5,000,000 in 2021).

== Works cited ==
- Welch, David (1983). Propaganda and the German Cinema: 1933-1945. I.B. Tauris. ISBN 9781860645204.
