= Charles Alexander, Duke of Württemberg =

Duke of Württemberg from 1733 to 1737

Charles Alexander
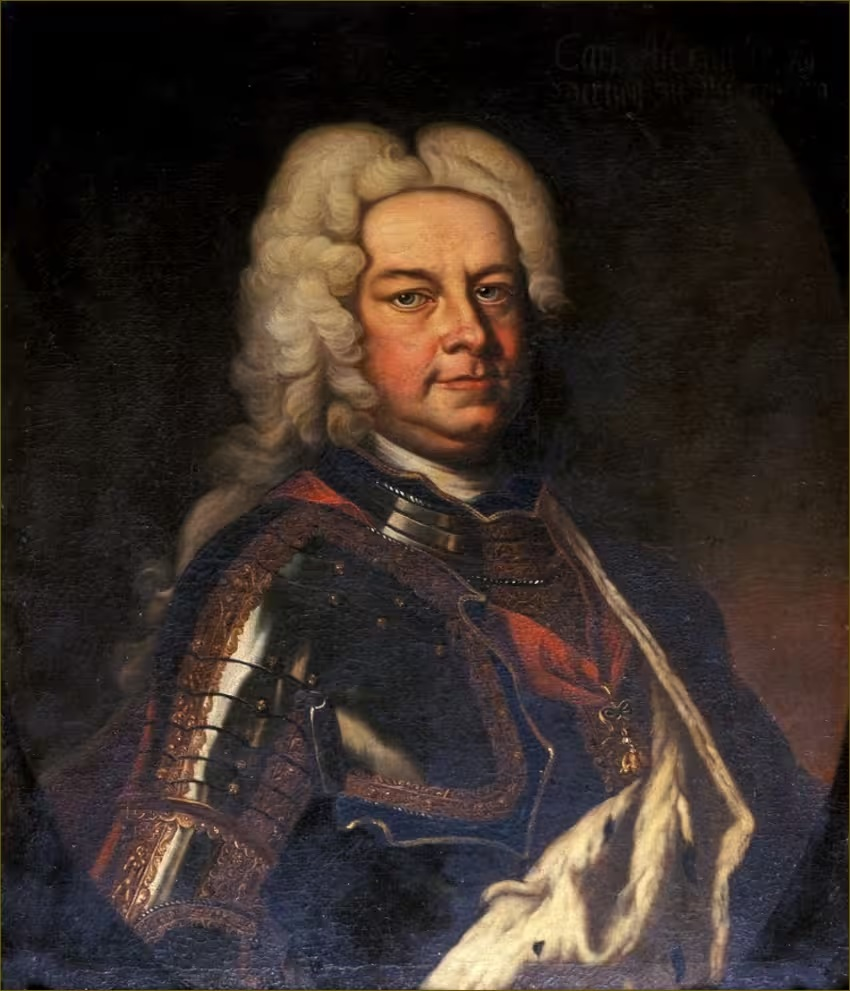

Duke of Württemberg
- Reign: 31 October 1733 – 12 March 1737
- Predecessor: Eberhard Louis
- Successor: Charles Eugene
- Born: 24 January 1684; Stuttgart
- Died: 12 March 1737 (aged 53); Ludwigsburg
- Burial: Ludwigsburg Palace
- Spouse: Maria Augusta of Thurn and Taxis (m. 1727)
- Issue: Charles Eugene, Duke of Württemberg; Louis Eugene, Duke of Württemberg; Frederick II Eugene, Duke of Württemberg; Auguste, Princess of Thurn and Taxis
- House: Württemberg
- Father: Frederick Charles, Duke of Württemberg-Winnental
- Mother: Margravine Eleonore Juliane of Brandenburg-Ansbach
- Religion: Roman Catholicism (previously Lutheranism)

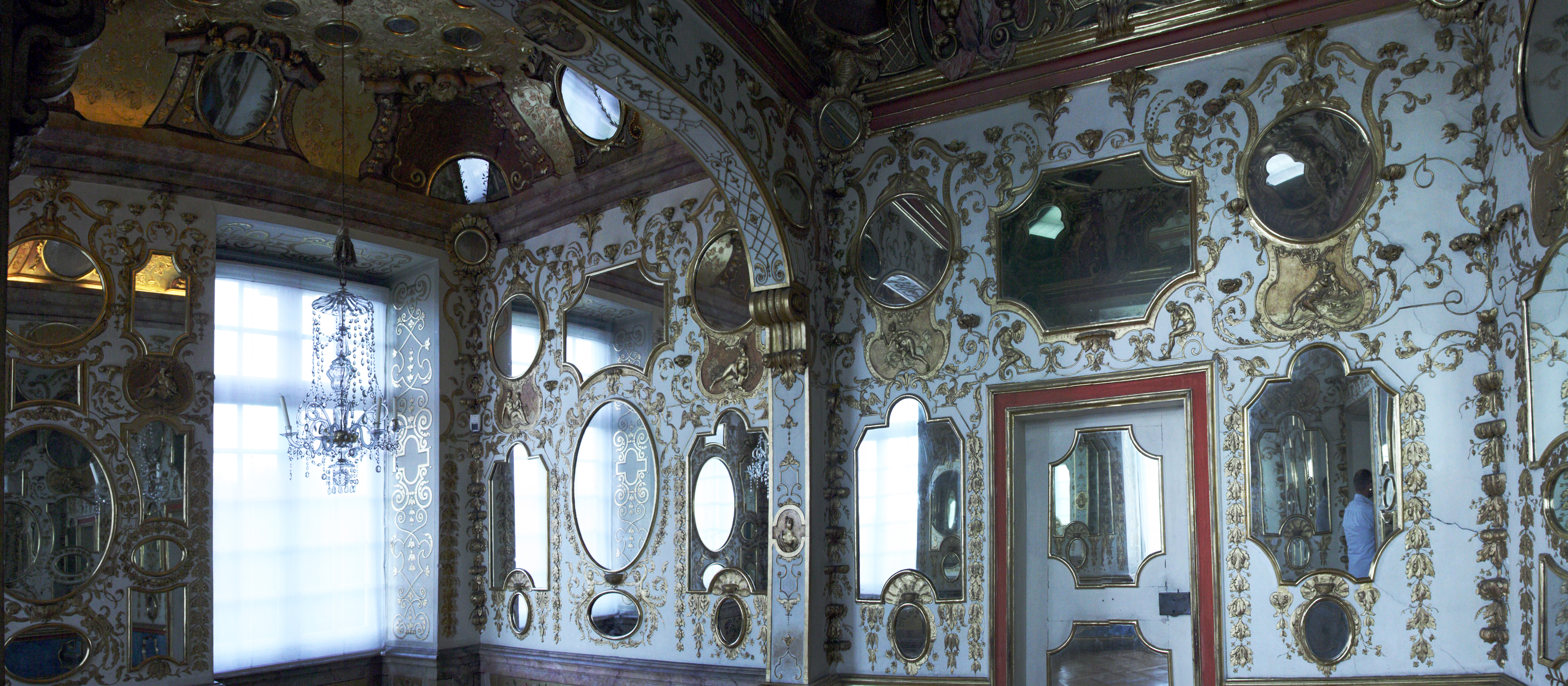
The Spiegelkabinett in the Old Haupbtbau of Ludwigsburg Palace, where Charles Alexander died in 1737

Charles Alexander of Württemberg (24 January 1684 – 12 March 1737) first became a Württemberg Duke (for the Württemberg-Winnental branch) in 1698 after his father's death and then went on to govern the Kingdom of Serbia as regent from 1720 until 1733, and then assumed the position of Duke of Württemberg, which he held until his death.

== Early life ==
Charles Alexander was born in the city of Stuttgart (now located in the German state of Baden-Württemberg) as the eldest son of Frederick Charles, Duke of Württemberg-Winnental and his wife, Eleonore Juliane of Brandenburg-Ansbach. The family's residence was Castle Winnental in Winnenden near Stuttgart.

His German name was Carl Alexander, as seen in the Stiftskirche Church records of Stuttgart. As a young boy, Carl Alexander was assigned a personal attendant named Wolffgang George Zeiher who served him throughout his childhood and as he became ruling Duke at age fourteen (of the Württemberg-Winnental branch) after his father died.

On May 23, 1691, at age seven, he was listed as "Prinz Carl Alexander von Württemberg" on the list of godparents (baptismal sponsors) for his personal attendant Wolffgang Zeiher's newborn son, Christoff. Such a young baptismal sponsor was out of the norm. (In light of the rarity, it may be conjectured that Carl Alexander made a request to participate in the event, or perhaps Carl Alexander was assigned that role as early training for presenting himself ceremonially.) Over the years as Carl Alexander grew up, other members of the royal household served as godparents for the children of his personal attendant Wolffgang, including Carl Alexander's mother who was listed as Her Highness ("Ihr Durchlaucht") Eleonora Juliana, godmother of Wolffgang's daughter, Eleonora Sophia. The following palace staff also served as godparents for Wolffgang's children: An Administrator of Royal Estate, a royal valet, the royal head baker, a royal pastry chef, the royal button maker, and a royal chambermaid. Each of those people adds a bit of color to the imagery of the household at Castle Winnenden as Carl Alexander grew up.

== Biography ==
At age fourteen, he began his career as a monarch when he succeeded his father as Duke of Württemberg-Winnental (a branch of the House of Württemberg) in 1698. He went on to serve in several other roles and was Duke of Württemberg at the time of his death in 1737.

As a successful army-commander in service of the Holy Roman Emperor, he had converted to Roman Catholicism for political gain and advancement in 1712. He was militarily successful under Prince Eugene of Savoy in the Spanish War of Succession as well as in the Ottoman–Venetian War. In 1719 he was appointed imperial governor of Belgrade.

In 1720 Holy Roman Emperor Charles VI appointed him governor of the Kingdom of Serbia in Belgrade. While in this post he married Princess Marie Auguste of Thurn and Taxis (1706–56) in 1727; they had 4 children.

After 13 years of autocratically ruling over Serbia, in 1733 Charles Alexander inherited the Duchy of Württemberg from his cousin, Eberhard Louis. As Duke of Württemberg he moved the court back from Ludwigsburg to the nearby capital of Stuttgart. He ruled over the Duchy until his sudden death in 1737, and was succeeded by his nine-year-old son, Charles Eugene.

During his reign, he employed as his financier the ill-fated Joseph Süss Oppenheimer, who was executed in 1738 for abuse of office during the reign of the duke.

== Family ==
On 1 May 1727, he married Princess Marie Auguste of Thurn and Taxis. They had six children, four of whom survived to adulthood:

- Charles Eugene, Duke of Württemberg (1728–1793), married Princess Elisabeth Fredericka Sophie of Brandenburg-Bayreuth; no issue.
- Eugen Louis (1729)
- Louis Eugene, Duke of Württemberg (1731–1795), married Countess Sophie Albertine of Beichlingen; had issue.
- Frederick II Eugene, Duke of Württemberg (1732–1797), married Princess Friederike Dorothea of Brandenburg-Schwedt; had issue.
- Alexander Eugen (1733–1734)
- Auguste Elisabeth (1734–1787), married Prince Karl Anselm, 4th Prince of Thurn and Taxis; had issue.

== In literature and film ==
Although the story of Duke Karl Alexander and Joseph Süß Oppenheimer constituted a relatively obscure episode in German history, it became the subject of a number of literary and dramatic treatments over the course of more than a century; the earliest of these having been Wilhelm Hauff's 1827 novella, titled Jud Süß. The most successful literary adaptation was Lion Feuchtwanger's 1925 novel titled Jud Süß based on a play that he had written in 1916 but subsequently withdrew.

Ashley Dukes and Paul Kornfeld also wrote dramatic adaptations of the Feuchtwanger novel. In 1934, Lothar Mendes directed "Jew Süss", a film adaptation of the novel. The role of Karl Alexander was played by Frank Vosper.

Charles Alexander and his relationship with Oppenheimer is fictionally portrayed in Veit Harlan's 1940 Nazi propaganda film titled Jud Süß. He is portrayed by Heinrich George.

Although inspired by the historical details of Süß's life, Hauff's novella, Feuchtwanger's novel, and Harlan's film only loosely correspond to the historical sources available at the Landesarchiv Baden-Württemberg.

== See also ==
- Great Turkish War

== Notes ==
Charles Alexander, Duke of Württemberg House of Württemberg Born: 24 January 1684 Died: 12 March 1737
Regnal titles
Preceded by post established territory governed by General Joseph O'Dwuyer	imperial regent of Kingdom of Serbia; 1720–1733	Succeeded by Charles Christoph of Schmettau
Preceded by Eberhard Louis	Duke of Württemberg-Stuttgart; 1733–1737	Succeeded by Charles II Eugene
