= Sueb =

Sueb is an Asian name that may refer to the following notable people:

Given name

- Sueb Chundakowsolaya (born 1933), Thai boxer
- Sueb Nakhasathien (1948–1990; more commonly spelled Seub), Thai conservationist

Surname

- Benyamin Sueb (1939–1995), Indonesian comedian, actor and singer
- Lim Young-sueb (born 1973), South Korean sport shooter

== See also ==
- Süß
