= Jud =

Jud may refer to:

== People ==
=== People with the surname ===
- Jakob Jud (1882–1952), Swiss linguist
- Leo Jud (1482–1542), Swiss reformer
- Valerio Jud (born 2002), Swiss snowboarder

=== People with the nickname or given name ===
- Jud Birchall (1855–1887), American baseball player
- Jud Birza (born 1989), American model
- Jud Buechler (born 1968), American basketball player and coach
- Jud Daley (1884–1967), American baseball player
- Jud Fabian (born 2000), American baseball player
- Jud Heathcote (1927–2017), American basketball player and coach
- Jud Hurd (1913–2005), American cartoonist
- Jud Kinberg (1925–2016), American producer and screenwriter
- Jud Larson (1923–1966), American racecar driver
- Jud Logan (born 1959), American athlete
- Jud McAtee (1920–2011), American ice hockey player
- Jud McLaughlin (1912–1964), American baseball player
- Jud McMillin (born 1977), American politician
- Jud Newborn (born 1952), American author and cultural anthropologist
- Jud Simons (1904–1943), Dutch gymnast
- Jud Smith (1869–1947), American baseball player
- Jud Strunk (1936–1981), American singer, songwriter and comedian
- Jud Taylor (1940–2008), American actor and TV director and producer
- Jud Timm (1906–1994), American football player
- Jud Tylor (born 1979), Canadian actress
- Jud Wilson (1894–1963), American baseball player
- Jud Yalkut (1938–2013), film and video maker and intermedia artist

== Places ==
- Jud, North Dakota, U.S.
- Jud, Texas, U.S.

== Other uses ==
- JUD (Latin: Juris utriusque doctor, Doctor of both laws), a scholar who has acquired a doctorate in both civil and church law
- Jud Fry, a fictional character in Oklahoma!
- Jud Crandall, a fictional character in Pet Sematary
- Jud., the Epistle of Jude in the Bible
- Jud (film), a 1971 American drama film

== See also ==
- Judd (disambiguation)
- Judah (disambiguation)
- Jud Süß (disambiguation)
- Jute (Danish: Jyde)
- Jew (German: Jüd)
- Yodh or yud, yod, jod, or jodh, a letter of the Semitic abjads, including (Hebrew: יוֹד or יוּד), Hebrew letter י
