= Paul Kornfeld (playwright) =

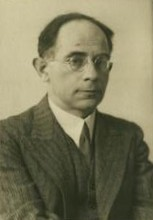
- Photo from the late 1930s
- Born: 11 December 1889; Prague, Bohemia, Crown of Bohemia, Austria-Hungary (now Czech Republic)
- Died: 25 April 1942 (aged 52); Ghetto Litzmannstadt (part of Łódź) in German-occupied Poland
- Education: German Charles-Ferdinand University, Prague
- Style: Expressionism

Paul Kornfeld (11 December 1889 – 25 April 1942) was a Prague-born German-language Jewish writer whose expressionist plays and scholarly treatises on the theory of drama earned him a specialized niche in influencing contemporary intellectual discourse.

== Writing career before and after World War I ==
Paul Kornfeld came to adulthood in the city of his birth which, as the capital of Bohemia was, at the time, a part of the Austro-Hungarian Empire and a major center of culture and learning. In 1913, at the age of 23, he formulated a thesis elucidating his philosophy of dramaturgy, Der beseelte und der psychologische Mensch [The Spiritual and the Psychological Person, also translated as The Inspired and the Psychological Being] and wrote the first draft of his most-renowned play, Die Verführung [The Seduction]. His circle of young friends and compatriots included some of the most renowned German-speaking Jewish literary figures of the era, Oskar Baum, Max Brod, Rudolf Fuchs, Willy Haas, Franz Janowitz, Franz Kafka, Egon Erwin Kisch, Otto Pick, Hermann Ungar, Johannes Urzidil and Franz Werfel.

In 1916, amidst the chaos of World War I and, with the ultimate birth of the future republic of Czechoslovakia only two years away, Kornfeld moved from Prague to Berlin where, during the Weimar period, he was to experience his most intense period of creativity. In 1918, during the final months of the war, he published a revised version of his thesis and oversaw the first production of Die Verführung. An expressionist work, which put forth abstract and revisionist ideas, it attempted to encapsulate the universality of human aspiration. Character development and plot details were eschewed in favor of an atmosphere of hopeless inability to cope, which defeated the play's tragic protagonist. A subsequent expressionist drama, Himmel und Holle [Heaven and Hell] presented even more abstract ideas, but in a vein that was, to a greater degree, lyrical and ecstatic.

Kornfeld also wrote satirical comedies which did not utilize expressionism and showed him in possession of a highly developed sense of humor. Der ewige Traum [The Eternal Dream] (1922), which held up a jaundiced mirror to reflect upon monogamous and polygamous relationships, Palme, oder Der Gekränkte [Palme, or The Offended One] (1924), which spotlighted a character of comically extreme sensitivity and Kilian, oder Die gelbe Rose [Kilian, or The Yellow Rose] (1926), all enjoyed audience approval as did his collaboration with Max Reinhardt on a 1925 Berlin theatrical production. Written in 1929 and staged in 1930, his final Berlin play, Jud Süß [Suss, the Jew, generally known under its literal translation, Jew Suss], presented a highly nuanced and objective portrayal of the controversial 18th century Jewish financier Joseph Süß Oppenheimer whose story had already been depicted a century earlier in Wilhelm Hauff's 1827 novella and, again, only four years before his own work, in Lion Feuchtwanger's 1925 historical novel. Within a decade, it also became the subject of a 1934 British film starring Conrad Veidt, and a notorious 1940 German antisemitic propaganda film with Ferdinand Marian in the title role.

== Hitler era and death ==
Hitler's coming to power in 1933 put an end to Kornfeld's Berlin odyssey and forced him back to Prague, no longer a gathering hub of German-language culture but, since October 1918, the capital of the new republic of Czechoslovakia. His subsequent literary output greatly decreased and he began work on what turned out to be his only novel, Blanche oder Das Atelier im Garten [Blanche or The Studio in the Garden], which was not published until 1957, fifteen years after its author's death. Shortly after completing it in 1941, he was taken into custody by the German authorities administering occupied Prague and transported to Ghetto Litzmannstadt, the name given during the German occupation to a section of Łódź, Poland's then-second-largest city. Between 1939 and 1944, over 200,000 Jews and a small number of Romani passed through the ghetto, an area of 4 sq. kilometers, of which only 2.4 kilometers were developed and habitable. Fuel supplies were extremely limited, and the inhabitants burned whatever they could to survive the harsh winter. Some 18,000 died during a famine in 1942, one of them Paul Kornfeld. He was 52 years old.

Through the passing decades, his literary output has remained, for the most part, neglected, although a critical edition, Paul Kornfeld: Revolution mit Flötenmusik und andere kritische Prosa [Paul Kornfeld: Revolution with Flute Music and Other Critical Prose], was issued in 1977.

== Sources ==
- Johnston, William M. (1972). The Austrian Mind An Intellectual and Social History 1848–1938. University of California Press. ISBN 0-520-04955-1
- Drain, Richard (1995). Twentieth-century Theatre: A Sourcebook. Routledge ISBN 0-415-09619-7, ISBN 978-0-415-09619-5 [includes an excerpt from The Inspired and the Psychological Being]
