= Sues =

Sues or SUES may refer to:

== People ==
- Alan Sues (1926–2011), American actor and comedian
- Hans-Dieter Sues (1956–2026), German-born American paleontologist

== Organization ==
- Shanghai University of Engineering Science, a public university in China

== See also ==
- Sue (disambiguation)
- Suess (disambiguation)
- Suez (disambiguation)
