= Judd =

Judd may refer to:

- Judd (engine), a range of racing engines built by Engine Developments Ltd.
- Judd (name), including a list of people with the name
- Judd, Iowa
- Judd Records, a record label
- The Judd School, a school in Tonbridge, Kent, England
- Judd Shoes, a former shoemaker in Adelaide, South Australia
