= Jud Süß =

1940 Nazi German film

- Theatrical release poster
- Directed by: Veit Harlan
- Written by: Veit Harlan; Eberhard Wolfgang Möller; Ludwig Metzger
- Based on: Jud Süß by Wilhelm Hauff
- Produced by: Otto Lehmann
- Starring: Ferdinand Marian; Werner Krauss; Heinrich George; Kristina Söderbaum
- Cinematography: Bruno Mondi
- Edited by: Wolfgang Schleif; Friedrich Karl von Puttkamer; Ludwig Metzger
- Music by: Wolfgang Zeller
- Production company: Terra Film
- Distributed by: Terra Film
- Release dates: 8 September 1940 (Venice); 24 September 1940 (Nazi Germany)
- Running time: 98 minutes
- Country: Nazi Germany
- Language: German
- Budget: 2.081 million ℛℳ
- Box office: 6.5 million ℛℳ

Jud Süß (pronounced [juːt zyːs], 'Jew Süss') is a 1940 Nazi German historical drama and propaganda film produced by Terra Film at the behest of Joseph Goebbels. Considered one of the most antisemitic films of all time, the film was directed by Veit Harlan, who co-wrote the screenplay with Eberhard Wolfgang Möller and Ludwig Metzger. It stars Ferdinand Marian and Kristina Söderbaum with Werner Krauss and Heinrich George in key supporting roles.

The film has been characterized as "one of the most notorious and successful pieces of antisemitic film propaganda produced in Nazi Germany." It was a great success in Germany, and was seen by 20 million people. Although its budget of 2 million Reichsmarks was considered high for films of that era, the box office receipts of 6.5 million Reichsmarks made it a financial success. Heinrich Himmler urged members of the SS and police to see it.

After the war, some of the leading cast members were brought to trial as part of the denazification process. They generally defended their participation in the film on the grounds that they had only done so under duress. Susan Tegel, author of Nazis and the Cinema, characterizes their postwar attempts to distance themselves from the film as "crass and self-serving"; she argues that their motives for accepting the roles seem to have been more driven by opportunistic ambition than by antisemitism. Harlan was the only major movie director of the Third Reich to stand trial for crimes against humanity. After three trials, he was given a light sentence because he convinced the courts that the antisemitic content of the film had been dictated by Goebbels and that Harlan had worked to moderate the antisemitism. Eventually, Harlan was reinstated as a citizen of the Federal Republic of Germany and made nine more films. He remained a controversial figure and the target of protests.

Together with Die Rothschilds and Der ewige Jude, both released in 1940, the film remains one of the most frequently discussed examples of the use of film to further the Nazi antisemitic agenda. In the 2000s, two documentary films and a drama were released that explore the history and impact of the film.

== Background ==
=== Joseph Süß Oppenheimer ===
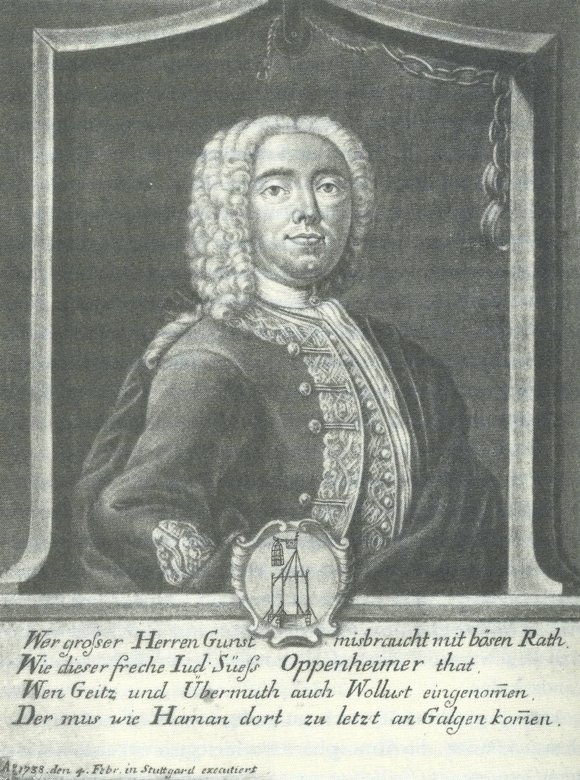
Joseph Süß Oppenheimer

Joseph Süß Oppenheimer was an 18th-century court Jew in the employ of Duke Karl Alexander of Württemberg in Stuttgart. As a financial advisor for Duke Karl Alexander, he also gained a prominent position at the court and held the reins of the finances in his duchy. He established a duchy monopoly on the trade of salt, leather, tobacco, and liquor and founded a bank and porcelain factory. In the process, he made multiple enemies who claimed, among other things, that he was involved with local gambling houses.

When Karl Alexander died suddenly, Oppenheimer was arrested and accused of fraud, embezzlement, treason, lecherous relations with the court ladies, accepting bribes, and trying to reestablish Catholicism. The Jewish community tried unsuccessfully to ransom him. After a heavily publicized trial during which no proofs of his guilt were produced, he was sentenced to death. When his jailers demanded that he convert to Christianity, he refused. He was taken to the gallows on 4 February 1738, and given a final chance to convert to Christianity, which he refused to do.

=== Feuchtwanger's novel ===
Although the story of Duke Karl Alexander and Joseph Süß Oppenheimer constituted a relatively obscure episode in German history, it became the subject of a number of literary and dramatic treatments over the course of more than a century, the earliest of these having been Wilhelm Hauff's 1827 novella. The most successful literary adaptation was Lion Feuchtwanger's novel titled Jud Süß (1925) based on a play that he had written in 1916 but subsequently withdrawn. As a Jew, Feuchtwanger did not intend his portrayal of Süß to be antisemitic but rather as a study of the tragedy caused by the human weaknesses of greed, pride, and ambition. With an interest in exploring the challenges confronting Jews in the diaspora, Feuchtwanger was particularly concerned with the issues of conversion and antisemitism. He was particularly struck by the fact that Süß could have saved himself by converting to Christianity but had steadfastly refused to do so, opting instead to return to formal Jewish observance and piety.

Ashley Dukes and Paul Kornfeld wrote dramatic adaptations of the Feuchtwanger novel. A German-born American director, Lothar Mendes, directed a British film adaptation of the novel in 1934. This film (entitled Power in the U.S.) starred Conrad Veidt, and was an early effort to expose Nazi antisemitism. It prompted the Nazi propaganda ministry to make their own version of the film, which starred the distinguished German star Werner Krauss, who had played the title role in The Cabinet of Dr. Caligari.

== Plot ==
Charles Alexander, Duke of Württemberg (Heinrich George), a man much beloved by his Swabian subjects, is crowned Duke and swears an oath to obey the laws of the duchy "according to the traditional Württemberg loyalty and honesty." However, the Duke soon becomes frustrated because the Württemberg Diet refuses him the funds needed to maintain a lifestyle comparable to his neighboring sovereigns; in particular, he wants a personal bodyguard and an opera and ballet company. Lacking funds even to purchase coronation gifts for the Duchess (Hilde von Stolz), the Duke sends a courtier to Frankfurt to borrow money from Joseph Süß Oppenheimer (Ferdinand Marian). Süß shows the emissary jewels and jewelry that are obviously beyond the Duke's means and then says that it would be his honor to provide the Duke with jewelry at a substantial discount. However, Süß insists on presenting the items to the Duke personally despite the Judensperre – a ban against Jews entering the city – which has been in force for over a century. Armed with a pass from the Duke, Süß cuts his hair, shaves his beard and dons "Christian" clothes so that he can enter Württemberg disguised as a Christian. As his carriage is involved in an accident, Süß gains a lift from Dorothea Sturm (Kristina Söderbaum) to the city.

The Duke is delighted with the jewelry, and Süß willingly defers payment. Süß offers to provide financing for the Duke's bodyguard, opera, and ballet as well. Eventually, the Duke discovers that he owes Süß 350,000 thalers, but Süß demurs, saying that all he wants in "payment" is the authority to maintain the roads and bridges of the duchy for 10 years – and the right to levy tolls for their use and upkeep. The Duke will receive a percentage of the proceeds, thereby freeing him from the financial limits imposed by the council.

The new tolls cause the price of food and other essentials to rise, enriching both Süß and the Duke. Süß gains the authority to levy taxes on salt, beer, wine, and wheat as well. He also assists in procuring local women for the Duke, thus engaging in the corruption of their morals. The increase in the price of basic necessities causes the people of Württemberg to suffer great privation. The oppressive taxes and brutal collection methods incite sporadic rebellions that are suppressed harshly. Süß goes so far as to destroy half of a blacksmith's house to prove his power to punish those who refuse to pay their taxes. When the blacksmith attacks Süß's coach with a sledgehammer, Süß has the blacksmith hanged, on the grounds that an attack on the Duke's minister is tantamount to an attack on the Duke himself.

After some initial resistance, the Duke yields to Süß's request for the repeal of the law prohibiting Jews from living in Württemberg; a horde of dirty, disreputable Jews are then shown moving into the city. Süß enables them to enrich themselves at the expense of the populace. The aged rabbi Loew (Werner Krauss) criticizes Süß for his excessively opulent lifestyle as the Duke's finance minister and warns that it could be his downfall, warning that, "The Lord punishes Jews who forget who they are!", but Süß pays him no heed. Süß relentlessly pursues Dorothea Sturm and schemes to marry her, but his plans are frustrated when her father, the council chairman (Eugen Klöpfer), intervenes. Dorothea and her fiancé, Faber (Malte Jaeger), marry in secret. Süß then has Dorothea's father imprisoned on the grounds that he is a leader of the conspiracy against the Duke.

When the council objects to the Duke's increasing usurpation of power and abrogation of the constitution, Süß suggests to him that this challenge to his authority can be suppressed by dismissing the council and restructuring the government so that the Duke can reign as an absolute monarch. Süß tells the Duke that he can accomplish this by hiring mercenaries and that, as a sign of their gratitude, the Jews of Württemberg will provide all the requisite funds. Süß argues that he would be most effective if the Duke were to give him a letter granting him immunity from the laws of Württemberg. The Duke refuses at first, but ultimately grants Süß's request. As part of an attempt to thwart the Duke's planned coup d'état, Faber is sent on a mission to get help from outside the city but is arrested as he tries to leave the city. Despite being tortured, he refuses to reveal the identities of his co-conspirators. Dorothea goes to Süß to beg for her husband's release but Süß demands that she have sex with him as the price for her husband's freedom. Süß rapes Dorothea, who then escapes and drowns herself. Süß keeps his promise to free Faber, who subsequently discovers his wife's drowned corpse.

Süß suggests to the Duke that the two of them go to Ludwigsburg on the pretext of meeting the emperor's emissary and return to Württemberg only after the planned coup has established him as an absolute monarch. However, before the foreign mercenaries arrive to effect Süß's coup, the people of Württemberg rise up under the leadership of Obrist Röder. The Württemberg soldiers refuse to fire on their fellow citizens and several of the townspeople go to Ludwigsburg to confront the Duke and Süß. As they are presenting their grievances, the Duke suffers a fatal heart attack. Süß is taken into custody by the rebels and subjected to a lengthy trial on charges that include treason and financial improprieties. However, he is ultimately convicted primarily on the charge that he had sex with a Christian woman. Süß is executed, pleading to the last that he was nothing more than a "faithful servant" of the late Duke. All the other Jews are then given three days to leave Württemberg. As the film draws to a close, a citizen of Württemberg, observing the Jews leave, comments, "May the citizens of other states never forget this lesson."

== Cast ==
Cast of Characters
| Role | Played by |
|---|---|
| Joseph Süß Oppenheimer | Ferdinand Marian |
| Levy, Secretary to Süß | Werner Krauss |
| Rabbi Löw | Werner Krauss |
| Isaak | Werner Krauss |
| Duke Karl Alexander | Heinrich George |
| Duke Alexander's wife | Hilde von Stolz |
| Dorothea Sturm | Kristina Söderbaum |
| Councilman Sturm, Dorothea's father | Eugen Klöpfer |
| Franz Joseph Freiherr von Remchingen | Theodor Loos |
| Karl Faber | Malte Jaeger |
| Colonel Röder | Albert Florath |
| Hans Bogner, a blacksmith | Emil Heß |
| Mr. Fiebelkorn | Walter Werner |
| Mr. Von Neuffer | Heinrich Schroth |
| Luziana | Else Elster |
| The Duke's black valet | Louis Brody |
| Judge Ratner | Paul Mederow |

== Production ==
=== Development ===
==== Goebbels' propaganda campaign ====
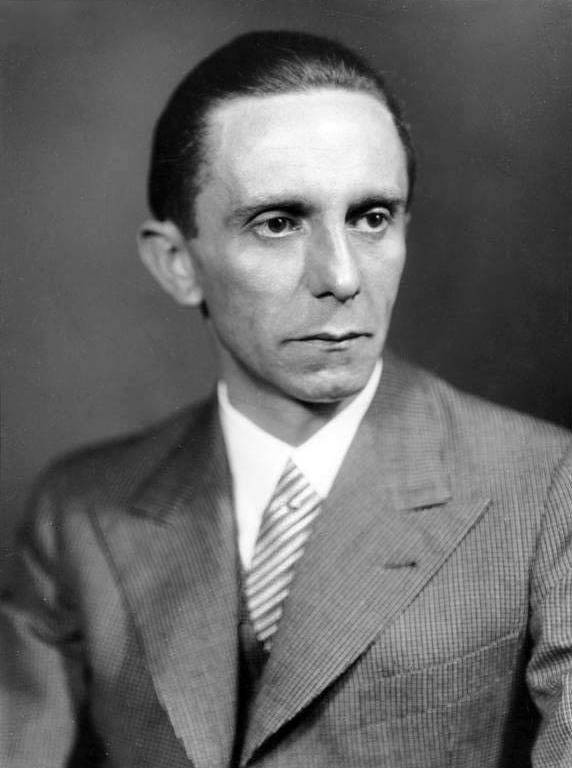
Joseph Goebbels

Adolf Hitler and the Propaganda minister Joseph Goebbels believed that film was a very potent tool for molding public opinion. The Nazi Party first established a film department in 1930 and Goebbels had taken a personal interest in the use of film to promote the Nazi philosophy and agenda. Soon after the Nazi takeover, Goebbels was insisting in speeches that the role of the German cinema was to serve as the "vanguard of the Nazi military" as they set forth to conquer the world. He asked them to "produce films with ... sharp racial contours" that portrayed men and society "as they are in reality."

According to Richard Levy, "Of the 1,100 feature films produced under the Nazis, only a handful demonstrated explicit antisemitic content and even there, the antisemitism was often secondary to the film's plot. ... Two films, however, both produced in 1940, were designed to translate National Socialism's antisemitic ideology to a popular audience: Der ewige Jude (The Eternal Jew, 1940) and Jud Süß (Jew Süß, 1940)."

In November 1938, Goebbels made a series of attacks against the Jews in the German media that, after the murder of a German diplomat in Paris by a Jew, resulted in the anti-Jewish riots known as Kristallnacht. Kristallnacht was considered by Hitler to have been a political disaster both within Germany and internationally, and he became furious with Goebbels. Not only did the brutality instigated by Goebbels evoke harsh criticism internationally, the mixed reaction in the German media evidenced a lack of broad-based support among Germans for antisemitic violence. Hitler expressed his frustration and anger at the mixed response from the German media and insisted that, instead of openly calling for violence against the Jews as Goebbels had in instigating the pogrom, Nazi propaganda should "elucidate events of foreign policy" in such a way that the German people themselves would call for violence against the Jews.

In response to Hitler's reprimand, Goebbels launched a campaign to promote the antisemitic views of the Nazis to the German populace. He ordered each film studio to make an antisemitic film. Hitler preferred films such as Der ewige Jude which presented the Nazi antisemitic agenda openly and directly; however Goebbels disliked the crudeness of such straight-forward approaches, preferring the much more subtle approach of couching antisemitic messages in an engaging story with popular appeal.

Although Goebbels did not usually have an active role in the production of particular films, he elected to do so in the case of major propaganda films such as Jud Süß. Saul Friedländer suggests that Goebbels' intent was to counter three films whose messages attacked the persecution of Jews throughout history by producing antisemitic versions of those films with identical titles. After viewing Lothar Mendes' sensitive 1934 British film Jew Süss starring an exile from Nazism, Conrad Veidt, Goebbels was adamant that "a new film version had to be made."

The film's impetus came from Joseph Goebbels' desire to make an antisemitic response to Mendes' philo-semitic film adaptation of Lion Feuchtwanger's 1925 novel of the same name. Because Mendes' film was sympathetic to the subject, the scriptwriters shifted their model to Wilhelm Hauff's 1827 novella. However, even after Harlan rewrote the original script, the result was not antisemitic enough to suit Goebbels' propaganda needs, so he personally intervened in the editing process to the point of dropping some scenes and rewriting others, including making a substantial change to the film's ending to show Süß as humbled rather than defiant. Thus, the message of the film was diametrically opposed to the intent of Feuchtwanger's novel. At the same time, however, the film evokes Feuchtwanger’s texts, twisting and reversing the core of the Jewish writer’s work. Although inspired by the historical details of Süß's life, the novel, novella, and film only loosely correspond to the historical sources available at the Landesarchiv Baden-Württemberg.

Christiane Schönfeld, who examines the connections between Feuchtwanger's Jud Süß play and novel and Veit Harlan's propaganda film, writes: "Lion Feuchtwanger [...] considered Harlan’s film an adaptation of his novel Jud Süß that perverted and reversed the intentions of his text, as he writes in his open letter to seven Berlin actors after having read a review of the film in an NSDAP newspaper [...]. Even without having seen the film, Lion Feuchtwanger had no doubt that Veit Harlan and his collaborators had expropriated his novel and adapted it to the purposes of Nazi propaganda. The synopsis of the film narrative provided in the review highlighted a perversion of the plot of Feuchtwanger’s text that the author instantly recognised. He identifies the focal point of the distortion when he refers to the desperate young woman and the sexual abuse she endures. She is indeed a prime example of the Nazis’ ruthless misrepresentation, and her character, her rape, and tragic death prove the Nazis’ deliberate abuse of the Jewish writer’s work."

Susan Tegel ascribes the genesis of the project more to opportunism than to ideological antisemitism. Tegel's assessment echoes Klaus Kreimeier's assertion that the "recognized stars of the (German) stage and screen" were less aligned with the Nazi philosophy and more motivated by professional ambition and the "illusion that Goebbels would fulfill them."

==== Metzger and Möller script ====
Ludwig Metzger had been trying to promote his proposal for a film on the life of Joseph Süß Oppenheimer since as early as 1921 but without any success. The publication of Feuchtwanger's book and Mendes' film adaptation of it irritated Metzger because of his inability to move forward such a project.

In January or February 1939, Metzger, now a screenwriter for Terra Filmkunst, mentioned his idea to Wolfgang Ebbecke with whom he was working on the script for Central Rio. Ebbecke shot down the idea, raising a number of objections including the existence of Mendes' British film on the same topic and the concern that German audiences might confuse the proposed film with Feuchtwanger's novel which was not antisemitic.

Undaunted by Ebbecke's objections, Metzger took his idea to Teich, the story editor at Terra but was once again turned down. Finally, Metzger approached Goebbels directly where his proposal was received like a "bomb hitting its target." Teich was informed that Terra should proceed with Metzger's proposal and so he reluctantly presented the idea to the head of the studio. When the studio head refused to approve the project, Goebbels ensured he was fired and replaced by Peter Paul Brauer, a minor director with no experience in producing films. As head of the studio, Brauer assigned himself the task of directing the film. However, the project stalled out for a number of reasons including challenges in recruiting a suitable cast and difficulties in producing a script acceptable to Goebbels.

At Goebbels' direction, Metzger was given a contract by Terra to write a script for the proposed film. He decided to base his script on the 1827 Hauff novella rather than the more recent and better known 1925 Feuchtwanger novel. However, when Goebbels read Metzger's draft of the script, he deemed it to be insufficiently antisemitic for his propaganda campaign. To remedy the script's deficiencies, Goebbels assigned playwright Eberhard Wolfgang Möller to assist Metzger, even though Möller had no experience as a screenwriter. Möller's role was to ensure that the script met Goebbel's ideological objectives. Möller decided to abandon Hauff's novella as the basis of the script, dismissing Hauff as too sentimental about the "emancipation of Jews and Poles."

In the meantime, Brauer was working on recruiting a cast to little success. Actors considered for the lead role of Joseph Süß Oppenheimer included Gustaf Gründgens, René Deltgen, Rudolf Fernau, Richard Häusler, Siegfried Bräuer, Paul Dahlke, and Ferdinand Marian. Gründgens declined, citing his responsibilities as director of the Prussian State Theatre. Marian also declined.

==== Veit Harlan ====
When Nazi Germany occupied Poland in September 1939, it now had the country's Jewish population of three million under its direct authority. In view of the German populace's tepid response to the orchestrated violence of Kristallnacht, the Nazis perceived an urgent need for films that would move German popular sentiment in favor of the Nazi Final Solution to the 'Jewish question'. Frustrated with the delays on the Jud Süß project, Goebbels ordered Fritz Hippler, the head of his film department, to sack Brauer and bring in Veit Harlan to take over as director.

After the war, Harlan claimed that no other director would touch the project and that he himself had tried to decline the role of director. Filmmaker Leni Riefenstahl, in her 1987 memoir, wrote that Harlan had told her of Goebbels' insistence that he direct the film and of his ardent desire to avoid involvement in the project. Harlan had written to Goebbels volunteering for military service to this end. Goebbels' responded to this by informing Harlan that, if he enlisted, he would do his military service at the front. According to Harlan, Goebbels screamed at him, "I can crush you like a bug on the wall!" When Harlan asked Riefenstahl to intercede for him with Goebbels, she demurred citing her own conflicts with the propaganda minister. Instead of intervening on his behalf, Riefenstahl wrote that she advised Harlan to move to Switzerland; however, Harlan expressed fear for his life and the impact it would have on his wife.

==== Script rewrite ====
According to Harlan's postwar testimony, he told Goebbels that the Metzger/Möller script was nothing more than "dramatized Stürmer", referring to the Nazi weekly propaganda publication. He argued that such a piece of poor writing would lead not to the portrayal of a "despicable Jew" but rather to just a "despicable film." Goebbels wanted Harlan to include sequences depicting Jewish ritual slaughter but Harlan demurred, arguing that portraying such cruelty would "make audiences sick to their stomachs." Harlan complained to Goebbels that all the characters were negative; to this, Goebbels retorted that Harlan would not turn down the role of Richard III just because he was a negative character. However, Goebbels acceded to Harlan's insistence on rewriting the script and Harlan spent from November 1939 to March 1940 revising the script although he kept much of what Metzger and Möller had written.

After the war, Harlan claimed that his script was less antisemitic than the Metzger/Möller script. He even claimed that the Mendes' script was more antisemitic than his. However, in rebuttal, Haggith and Newman point out that Harlan added an important sequence in which Süß is responsible for the execution of a blacksmith, a sequence which served to increase the audience's hatred for Süß.

=== Pre-production ===
Feeling that a project of this significance required top-caliber actors and frustrated at the delay in casting the film, Goebbels personally participated in the recruitment of the lead actors. For example, he insisted that Ferdinand Marian and Werner Krauss take on key roles in the film. However, Goebbels had to employ a combination of accommodation, generous compensation, pressure, intimidation and even threats of reprisal in order to fill the lead roles in the film with the top German cinema stars of the day. Harlan claimed that "virtually every actor was performing under duress."

Daniel Azuelos ascribes the cast's reluctance to an unwillingness to be typecast as Jews. David Welch identifies Werner Krauss as having asked Goebbels to make a public pronouncement stating that Krauss was not Jewish but merely "playing a part as an actor in the service of the State." In order to address their concerns, Goebbels issued a disclaimer stating that those actors playing the parts of Jews were in fact of pure 'Aryan' blood.

Similarly, Josef Škvorecký also notes that all the major cast members as well as Harlan himself tried in various ways to avoid participation in the project; however Škvorecký ascribes a rather different motivation to the cast than the one that Azuelos propounds. Škvorecký attributes the reluctance of actors to participate in what he characterizes as a "politically-most-correct film" as an indication of "how aware most German artists were of the fact that antisemitism under Hitler changed from prejudice to murder." While cast members could have declined the roles that were offered to them, Škvorecký asserts that such action would have required "extraordinary courage: the dire consequences of such an act of defiance were only too easy to imagine." According to Škvorecký, "Goebbels either outwitted [the actors he desired for the cast], or knew about compromising circumstances in their lives and used this knowledge for bludgeoning them into acceptance." Elaborating on the "compromising circumstances", Škvorecký writes, "One of the paradoxes of this sinister film is how many participants in the violently racist project had either Jewish spouses or relatives, were disciples of Jewish artists and known friends of Jews, or had been—before the Nazi takeover—left-leaning intellectuals, even communists." For example, Škvorecký points out that Veit Harlan's first wife was Dora Gerson, a German-Jewish actress and cabaret singer (who was later murdered in Auschwitz). Harlan himself had flirted with socialism. Although Werner Krauss was openly antisemitic and an ardent Nazi, his daughter-in-law was Jewish. Ferdinand Marian had a half-Jewish daughter from his first marriage and the former husband of his second wife was a Jew.

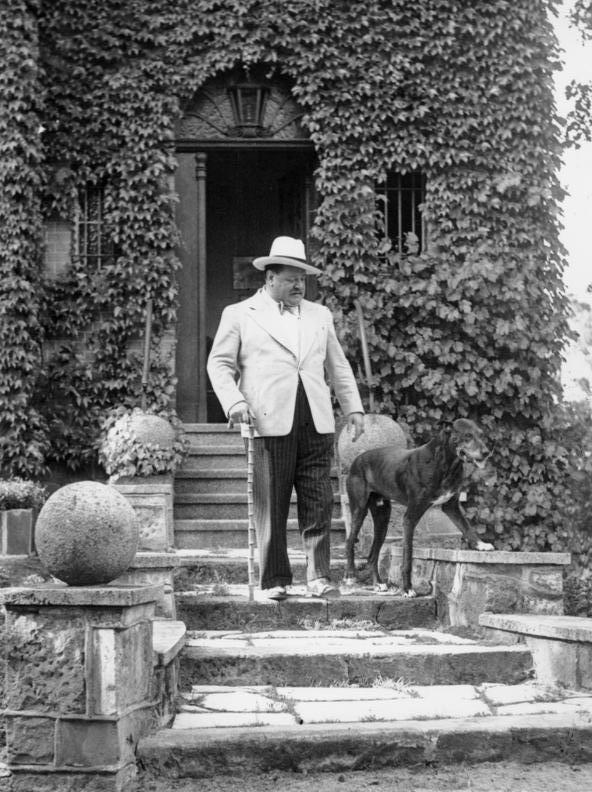
Heinrich George

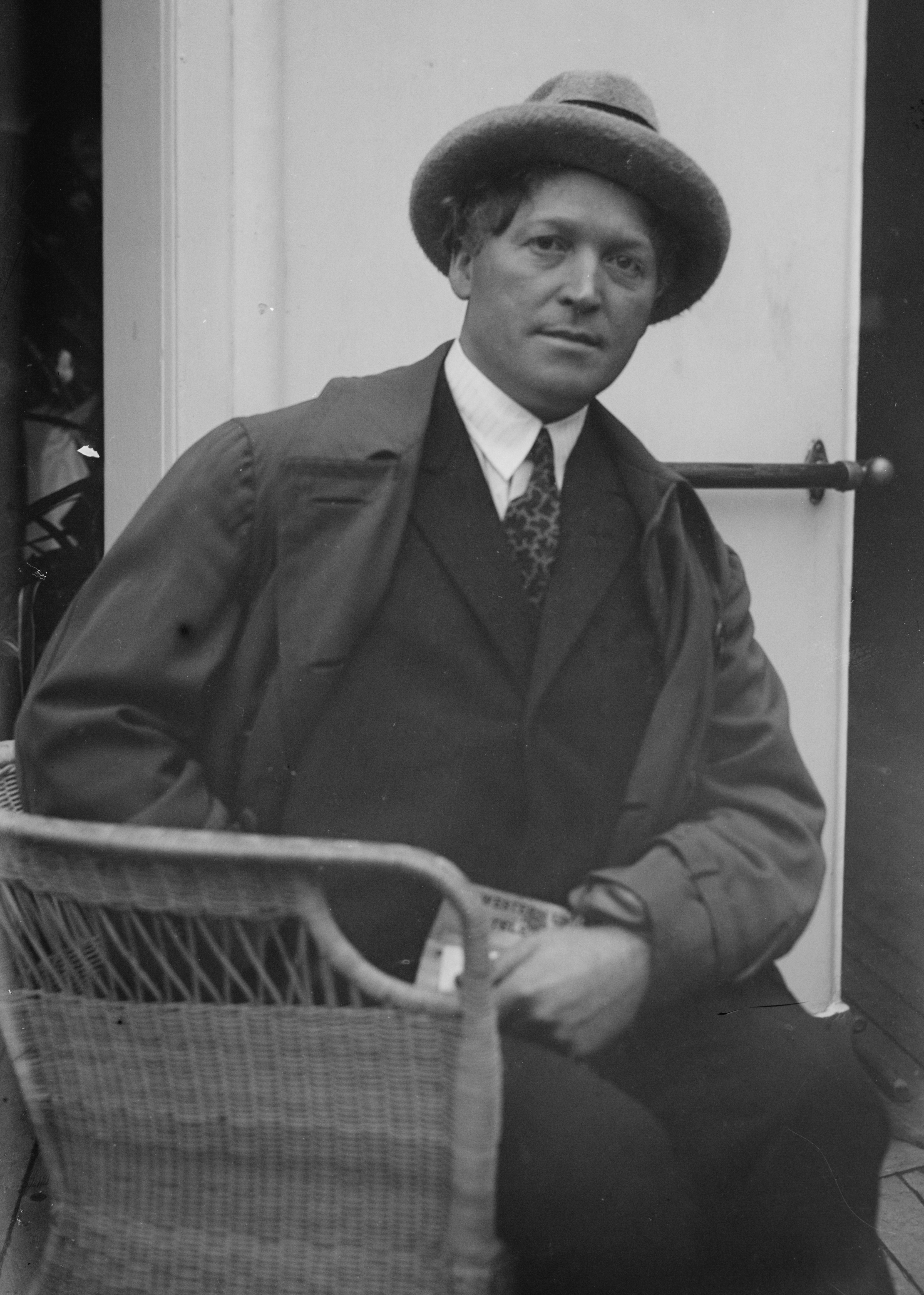
Werner Krauss

Heinrich George was active in the Communist party before the Nazi takeover. He had worked with fellow left-wingers, the theatre director Erwin Piscator and dramatist Bertolt Brecht and had starred in the lead role of the film Berlin-Alexanderplatz (1931). After the Nazi takeover, George was identified as a "non-desirable" actor because of his earlier political affiliations and was barred from working in cinematic productions; however, he was able to reach an accommodation with the Nazi regime and was eventually appointed director of the Schiller Theater, Berlin in 1938. From that point onwards, George actively collaborated with the Nazis and agreed to star in Nazi propaganda films such as Jud Süß and Kolberg (1945) as well as appearing in numerous newsreels.

George had a stocky build and a Berlin accent which made him readily recognizable to German audiences. His prestige as a leading actor of the day made him an "extraordinarily valuable catch for the Nazis." Cooke and Silberman describe him as "the actor most closely tied to fascist fantasies of the autocratic and the populist leader". George's affiliation with the Nazis would have fatal consequences for him after the war when the Soviets arrested him as a Nazi collaborator. He died in 1946 while interned in NKVD special camp Nr. 7 located in Sachsenhausen.

According to Harlan, it was Goebbels who insisted that Harlan's wife, Kristina Söderbaum, play the leading female role. According to Antje Ascheid, Soderbaum is "frequently identified as most singularly representative of the Nazi ideal, as the quintessential Nazi star." As a beautiful Swedish blonde, Söderbaum had the baby-doll looks that epitomized the model Aryan woman. In fact, she had already played the role of the innocent Aryan in a number of feature films and was well-known to German audiences. Her youth and beauty made her a symbol of health and purity, and thus an exemplary specimen of the Nazi ideal of womanhood. In a number of her films, she had been imperiled by the threat of "rassenschande" ("racial pollution"). Because two of her films ended with her committing suicide by drowning, she was given the mock honorary title Reichswasserleiche ('Drowned Corpse of the Reich').

Harlan argued to Goebbels that Söderbaum, having just given birth, was too weak to take on the role. Goebbels countered that a special room could be set up as a nursery and that a wet-nurse could be hired to care for the infant. He further offered to halt shooting if Söderbaum became ill. Harlan later reported that Söderbaum was so upset by the entire affair that she considered fleeing back to her native Sweden to avoid having to play the part of Dorothea. In the end, however, she decided to stay and performed the role.

The story was different in the case of Ferdinand Marian who is often characterized as having established a reputation as a "matinee idol". Initially, Marian was repulsed by the proposal that he play the title role of Jud Süß and demurred for almost a year. As a result, he was not confirmed in the role until about a week before shooting was scheduled to begin. According to Kristina Söderbaum, Marian was afraid that playing such an unappealing character would damage his image with film audiences. She recalled that Marian had told Goebbels that his stage persona was one of a bon-vivant and a lover and that Süß, in contrast, was a "truly unpleasant character". Goebbels rebutted Marian's argument by pointing out that he had just seen Marian's portrayal of Iago, asking "Was he a nice bon-vivant?" When Marian responded "But that was Shakespeare, Herr Minister!", Goebbels screamed into his face saying, "And I am Joseph Goebbels!"

Marian finally agreed to play the part of Süß for fear of reprisal against members of his family. Marian had a daughter from his first marriage to the Jewish pianist, Irene Saager. The former husband of his second wife was also Jewish, making her son (and Marian's stepson) half-Jewish.

Goebbels, however, used not only intimidation but also cajoling and generosity to achieve his goals. Ferdinand Marian requested compensation of 50,000 marks for taking on the role of Süß, an amount double anything he had received for previous roles. When asked to approve this amount, Goebbels did so citing the importance of the film and the need for a high-caliber cast to ensure its success.

According to his biographer, Friedrich Knilli, Marian never forgave himself for having accepted the role of Süß. Knilli ascribes Marian's alcoholism and alleged suicide after the war to his feelings of guilt.

Of all the cast members, Werner Krauss was the one most clearly identified as an antisemite. His consummate skills in characterization had earned him the title of "the man with a thousand faces". There is some difference of opinion regarding the number of roles that Krauss played in the film. While it is generally recognized that, with the exception of Marian's title role, the other five speaking parts that depicted Jews were all played by Krauss, Gottfried Reinhardt asserts that Krauss played "no less than thirteen Jews" in the movie. The roles that Krauss played in the film are often characterized as portraying antisemitic stereotypes. In an interview, Harlan explained that the decision to have Krauss play all the roles was "meant to show how all these different temperaments and characters—the pious patriarch, the wily swindler, the penny-pinching merchant, and so on—were all ultimately derived from the same (Jewish) root". Katrin Sieg describes Krauss' face as eerily appearing in different guises whenever the camera pans across a crowd of Jews, creating what Sieg calls a "paranoid effect of déjà vu".

=== Filming ===
Shooting began in March 1940 and, with the exception of some scenes which were shot on location in Prague, most of the filming took place at the UFA studios in Berlin Babelsberg. The scenes showing the entry of the Jews into Württemberg and worshipping in a synagogue were filmed in Prague where Jewish extras were coerced into performing. 120 Jews were taken from Lublin Ghetto by Harlan for use in the film.

The total cost was 2.081 million ℛℳ (equivalent to $9,210,804 in 2021), a rather high figure for German feature films of that era. It earned 6.2 million ℛℳ (equivalent to $27,442,087 in 2021) at the box office for a profit of 3.172 million ℛℳ (equivalent to $14,039,726 in 2021) thus making it a blockbuster in contrast to the commercial failure of Der Ewige Jude. David Culbert attributes the film's box-office success in large part to "its lavish sets, its effective crowd scenes, its skillful script, and the splendid acting by most of the principals."

=== Post-production ===
According to Harlan's postwar testimony, Goebbels was infuriated when he saw Harlan's first version of the film because it was not antisemitic enough for his purposes. Harlan reported that Goebbels accused him of being "incapable of thinking in political terms". Goebbels told him that he "should produce political films and not [the kind of] films that he would make in peacetime." Goebbels' dissatisfaction was centered on the relationship between Dorothea, the leading female character and Süß. He complained that Harlan had "transformed Süß, a monster, into a Romeo."

Harlan testified that Goebbels removed him from the editing process and insisted on many changes, mostly with the intent of making Süß more unambiguously evil. The film was extensively re-edited to remove ambiguities that portrayed Süß in too sympathetic a light to suit Goebbels' antisemitic agenda. For example, Goebbels insisted on dropping a scene in which Dorothea responds to Süß's wooing with a smile. Scenes in which Süß was depicted as "too pleasant" were simply dropped. In some scenes, new lines were scripted for Marian to read in order to make his character less sympathetic. Other scenes were added including a new ending to replace the original one written by Harlan. Harlan claimed that he had wanted to make the hanging of Süß appear to have been a "great injustice." For the final execution scene, Harlan had written a defiant speech in which Süß condemned the German authorities. When Goebbels was shown a rough-cut copy, he was infuriated, insisting that Süß must not be portrayed in any way as a martyr. Demanding that Süß must be humbled and humiliated at the end, he had Harlan's speech replaced with one in which Süß cravenly begged for his life.

While Harlan's account of Goebbels' involvement in the film has been treated by a number of sources as factual, Haggith and Newman assert that "it is difficult to find any evidence of significant interference (by Goebbels) aside from casting and the appointment of Harlan." They point out that it was in Harlan's interest to shift the blame to Goebbels after the war.

== Release and reception ==
The film premiered at the Venice Film Festival on 8 September 1940 and received rave reviews, earning the top award. (Note: Saul Friedländer says that the film won the "Golden Lion" award. Lothar Kahn gives the name of the award as the "Gold Crown".)

It was a great box-office success in Germany and abroad unlike most of the other major antisemitic films produced in Nazi Germany. 60,000 people saw the film in the Ufa-Palast am Zoo by 7 October, and over 100,000 people saw the film in Königsberg. Otto Froböse, the financial auditor of Terra, estimated that 21 million people saw the film in commercial theaters. It ranked sixth out of the thirty most popular German films of the war years and was the number one film of the 1939–1940 season. In France, the film was released in February 1941, was viewed by an estimated one million people before showings ended in 1944.

Heinrich Himmler ordered that the film be shown to SS units about to be sent against Jews, to non-Jewish populations of areas where Jews were about to be deported, and to concentration camp guards. Children under the age of fourteen were prohibited from seeing the film. There were reports of anti-Jewish violence after audiences viewed the film; in particular, teenagers seemed particularly prone to be instigated to violence by the film. Stefan Baretzki, a guard at Auschwitz concentration camp, later said that after they were shown Jud Süß and similar films, guards would beat up Jewish prisoners the next day.

In early 1941, the company Nordisk Tonefilm sought permission to distribute the film in Sweden but it was banned by the Censor. During the war the movie was never screened in public in Sweden, although the German embassy arranged screenings for special invitees.

Feuchtwanger was horrified and incensed at the way in which his work had been manipulated and distorted, calling Harlan's film a Schandwerk ("a shameful work"). In 1941, he wrote an open letter to seven actors. Based on the sentiments expressed in the letter, it appears that Feuchtwanger was shocked that these men, whom he considered colleagues and who he knew were familiar with his work, would agree to participate in Goebbels's antisemitic propaganda film.

== Postwar legacy ==
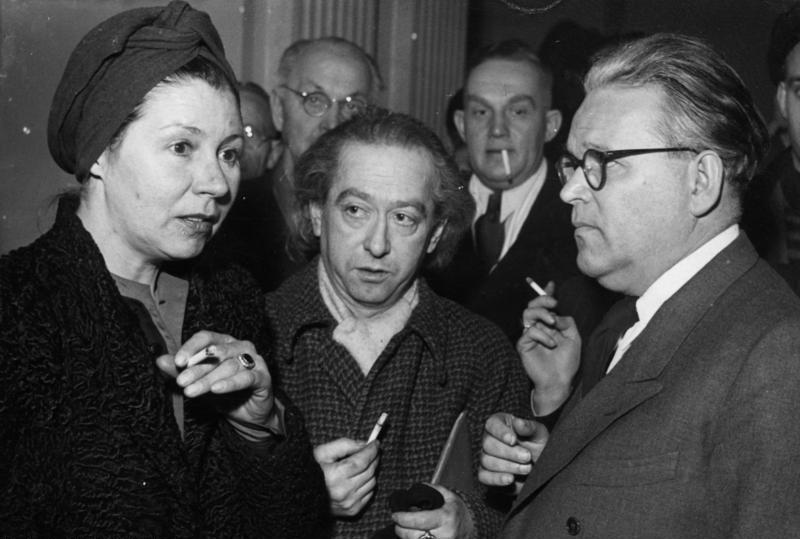
Harlan (right) with the widow of Ferdinand Marian at Harlan's 1948 trial

In 1945, exhibition of the film in Germany was banned by decree of the Allied Military Occupation. In fact, the film was banned throughout the western world and most of the extant copies were destroyed.

Harlan, who had later directed the propaganda movie Kolberg (1945), was the only film director of the Third Reich to be charged with crimes against humanity. Harlan defended himself asserting that he had been neither Nazi nor antisemitic. He claimed that Goebbels had controlled his work and that he should not be held personally responsible for its content. He recounted the ways in which he had been forced to endure Goebbels' constant haranguing and meddling in the production of the film. In the end, the court condemned the film but exonerated the director. While Harlan had not acted nobly, the court recognized that he had operated under duress and should not be held responsible for the content of the film.

After the war, all the cast members also disclaimed responsibility, pleading that they had been coerced into participating in the film. According to his biographer Friedrich Knilli, Marian never came to terms with his having accepted the role of Süß and became an alcoholic, dying shortly after the war in a 1946 car accident. Some have attributed the accident to suicide.

Both Heinrich George and Werner Krauss were placed under arrest because of their past affiliation with the Nazi party. Although Heinrich George had been a member of the German Communist Party before the Nazi takeover, he was nonetheless interned as a Nazi collaborator at the Soviet special camp in Sachsenhausen where he died in 1946.

Werner Krauss was banned from performing on stage and in films in Germany. He was required to undergo a de-Nazification process from 1947 to 1948. Ultimately, he was rehabilitated to the extent of being invited to German film festivals. In 1954, he was awarded the Order of the Federal Republic of Germany; in 1955, he received the High Decoration of the Republic of Austria.

In the first few years after the war, Kristina Söderbaum was often heckled off the stage and even suffered the indignity of having rotten vegetables thrown at her. In subsequent years, she frequently expressed regret for her roles in antisemitic films. Although Söderbaum continued to play roles in film, she was never offered a leading role after the war. Eventually, she became a photographer of celebrities.

=== Distribution ===
Harlan was required by court order to destroy what was then believed to be the only remaining negative of Jud Süß and he reportedly did this in April 1954. A few years later, however, copies of the film began to turn up to the embarrassment of the West German government. After a lengthy investigation, it was determined that another negative existed in East Germany and it was used to make prints that were dubbed in Arabic and distributed in Middle Eastern countries such as Egypt and Lebanon. Though that negative has never been located, it has been widely suspected that this version was produced and distributed by the Stasi or the KGB in order to arouse antisemitism among Egyptians and Palestinians against the US-backed Israel (and henceforth, support for the Soviet-backed Egyptian president Gamal Abdel Nasser).

In 1983, the Los Angeles-based neo-Nazi National Socialist League under Russell Veh stirred controversy in the United States when it attempted mass distribution of Jud Süß. The NSL was actively involved in the distribution of Nazi propaganda films in America, including Triumph of the Will.

The film is currently held by the F. W. Murnau Foundation. The foundation only permits screenings of the film when accompanied by an introduction explaining the historical context and the intended impact.

In July 2008, the film was publicly screened in Budapest by Sándor and Tibor Gede, Hungarian right-wing extremists. without the permission and consent of the Murnau Foundation. The Murnau Foundation protested to the Hungarian government through diplomatic channels.

The film is available for sale on VHS from Facets.

== Analysis ==
=== Historical accuracy ===
Although the film claimed to be "historically accurate", the plot presents only a few historically accurate details and significantly departs from the historical record on a number of key points. Some of these departures were based on the Feuchtwanger novel and the Mendes' film adaptation of it; others were introduced by Goebbels and Harlan. According to Wallace, it is generally recognized that the narratives of both films are only loosely related by being rooted in the same "chapter of Wurttemberg history".

Joseph Süß Oppenheimer did serve Duke Karl Alexander as a court Jew. When the duke died suddenly, Süß was, in fact, brought to trial and subsequently executed in an iron cage more or less as depicted in the film. Haggith and Newman assert that much of the rest of Harlan's film is "pure invention." For example, the film presents the grounds for Süß's execution as being abuse of power and sexual relations with a Christian woman. According to Shay Hazkani, these accusations are not mentioned in any of the historical essays about the real Süß.

=== Relationship to previous works ===
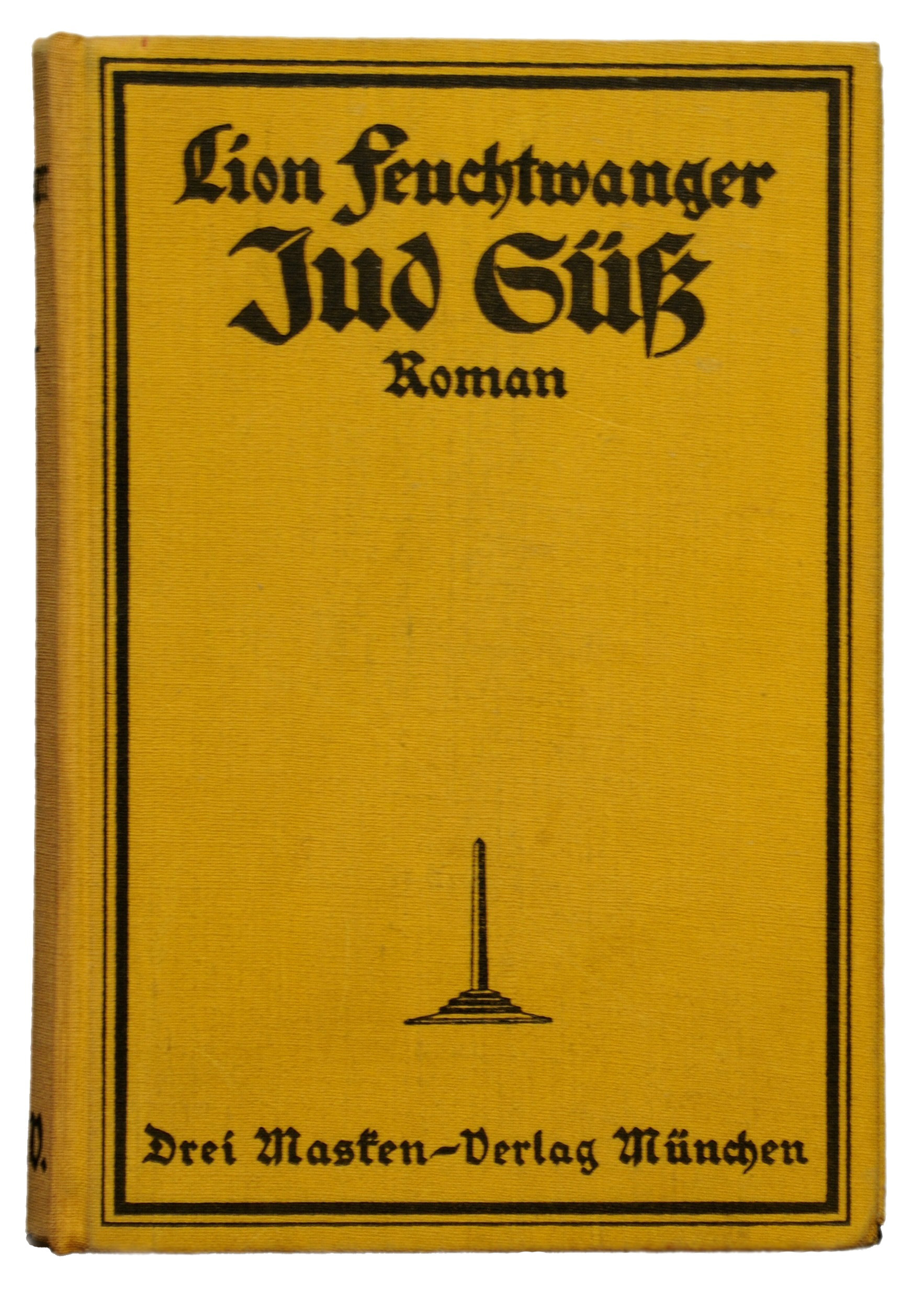
Cover of Lion Feuchtwanger's 1925 novel, Jud Süß

Although Lion Feuchtwanger believed that Harlan's film relied heavily on his novel, Bergfelder and Cargnelli characterize the film as "based primarily on Wilhelm Hauff's novella" and assert that it only uses a few characters from Feuchtwanger's novel. Even these characters and their actions are distorted to support the film's antisemitic message.

Because Goebbels envisioned a film that would be a response to Mendes' film adaptation of Feuchtwanger's novel, Harlan's plot shares a similar structure to the plot of the Mendes film with a few crucial changes which Feuchtwanger characterized as shameful distortions. Feuchtwanger himself referred to Harlan's film as a "Schandwerk" ("a shameful work") and wrote an open letter to seven Berlin actors, two of them having played lead roles in the film. He asserted that Harlan's film had distorted his novel so much that it was a perversion of it. He further called into question their motives for making the film in light of their familiarity with him and his novel.

Haines and Parker characterize Feuchtwanger's works and the Mendes film adaptation as "diametrically opposed to Nazi anti-Semitism."

For Feuchtwanger, Süß was a forerunner that symbolized the evolution in European philosophy and cultural mentality, representing a shift towards Eastern philosophy, from Nietzsche to Buddha, from "the old to the new covenant."

In his novel, Feuchtwanger portrayed greed, pride and ambition as human weaknesses found in both Jews and Gentiles and which could be overcome by the denial of desire. In contrast to Feuchtwanger's philosophical meditation on the tension between Eastern and Western philosophy, Harlan's film casts these as uniquely Jewish traits and presents Jews as a "dangerous and recklessly underestimated threat."

=== Stereotypes of Jews ===
The film employs a number of negative stereotypes of Jews as being materialistic, immoral, cunning, untrustworthy and physically unattractive. At one extreme, Jews are portrayed as cut-throat capitalists; at the other, they are depicted as poor, filthy immigrants. Mike Davis writes that "A thousand years of European anti-semitism were condensed into the cowering rapist, Süß, with his dirty beard, hook nose and whining voice."

The character of Süß is based on the stereotype of the grasping Jewish moneylender. There is an early scene in which Süß is shown to possess a fortune in jewels and jewelry. In another, he tells an innocent German girl that his home is "the world" (reflecting the Nazi stereotype of Jews as rootless wanderers in contrast to the Germans' love of their German homeland). Several conversations between Jewish characters perpetuate the Nazi line that Jews are inherently hostile to non-Jews. According to David Welch, the Nazis issued a guide to the press explaining how to interpret the film. The guide emphasized that a key point of the film was that once Jews like Süß got into positions of responsibility and power, "they exploited power, not for the good of the community, but for their own racial ends."

=== Racial pollution ===
In both Feuchtwanger's novel and Harlan's film, the dramatic climax is rape. However, Feuchtwanger posits that Süß has a hidden daughter whom the duke discovers, rapes and who then dies by drowning. The novel then focuses on Süß's grappling with the desire for revenge and the tragedy resulting from his decision to exact vengeance for the loss of his daughter. Harlan replaced the rape of Süß's daughter by the duke with Süß's rape of an Aryan woman, thus completely inverting Feuchtwanger's plot device from a father's tragic quest for vengeance to the punishment of a Jew for having sexual relations with a Christian.

Christiane Schönfeld writes that, "[t]he Jew as sexual beast and vampire, sucking the life spirit from individual and community alike is an all too common motif in anti-Semitic propaganda and is put to effective use in Harlan's film." Michael Töteberg writes: "[Jud Süß] openly mobilized fears and sexual aggression and exploited them for anti-Semitic incitement." According to Michael Kater, the film was shown to "a large number of (German) girls" in order to warn them of the "sexual devastation that Jews had wrought in the past" and to remind them of the Nuremberg Race Laws of 1935. In an interview with Der Film given before the release of the film, Harlan pointed out that Süß was ultimately sentenced to death not for his financial machinations which were technically legal but for violating an ancient law which prohibited Jews from having sexual relations with Christian women. He then cites this as being "an interesting parallel to the Nuremberg Laws.

There is also Süß's role as a purveyor of women for the Duke, and his relentless pursuit of an "Aryan" woman for sexual purposes, even after she rebuffs his first attempt to seduce her. From the Nazi perspective, this was Rassenschande, a racial pollution, a crime against the German blood. The heroine's suicide is a proper response of a German to such a tragedy.

=== "Jew in disguise" ===
One antisemitic theme that is introduced at the beginning of the film is the portrayal of Süß as the typical "Jew in disguise", a concept which Welch describes as "the inherent rootlessness of the Jew and his ability to assimilate himself into whichever society he chooses." Süß is presented to the audience first in traditional ghetto attire and then a quick cutaway to a shot of him in elegant clothes riding in a carriage on his way to Stuttgart. Thus, Süß is shown to be hiding his true identity as a marginalized Jew and posing as a respected member of German society. However, despite Süß's attempts to fit into Württemberg high society, Harlan will not let the audience forget that he is ultimately depicted as a "dirty Jew" and underlines this point by juxtaposing him with the elderly Rabbi Löw. In an interview with Der Film, a German film magazine, Harlan explained:

It is meant to show how all these different temperaments and characters – the pious Patriarch, the wily swindler, the penny-pinching merchant and so on – are ultimately derived from the same roots.

Around the middle of the film we show the Purim festival, a victory festival which the Jews celebrate as a festival of revenge on the Goyim, the Christians. Here I am depicting authentic Jewry as it was then and as it now continues unchecked in Poland. In contrast to this original Jewry, we are presented with Süss, the elegant financial adviser to the Court, the clever politician, in short, the Jew in disguise.

=== Effectiveness of the film ===
Stephen Lee writes that Hitler's vision of the kind of film that was likely to engage the German public proved to be less effective than the more subtle approach advocated by Goebbels. For example, the "documentary film" Der Ewige Jude (The Eternal Jew) that Hitler commissioned was so crude and strident that many audiences were repelled by the grotesque imagery and the film was a box-office flop. The failure of Der Ewige Jude convinced Goebbels that the most effective approach for disseminating propaganda was subtle and indirect. Lee writes that Goebbels had learned to "introduce propaganda as a subliminal message within the context of a story with which the audience could identify." The Nazi antisemitic message was more subtly and artfully presented in the feature film format that Goebbels preferred.

Richard Levy attributes the effectiveness of the film in part to an "arguably engaging story" and the casting of some of the leading German stars of that period including Ferdinand Marian, Heinrich George, Kristina Söderbaum, and Werner Krauss. He characterizes the film's antisemitic message as being "integrated into the film's story and strategy rather than overwhelming it or seeming to stand apart from it." Edgar Feuchtwanger attributes the success of the film to it being "a combination of virulent anti-Semitism with a compelling love story, full of sex and violence."

However, Stephen Brockman cautions against making "all-too-sweeping assumptions" about how effective Jud Süß was as a propaganda tool. To support his argument, he points to anecdotal evidence that, rather than being perceived as a despicable Jew, Marian's portrayal of Süß was considered to be quite sympathetic; so much so that he received fan mail from women who had become infatuated with his character.

David Culbert notes that "[t]hose who have condemned Jew Süss as a lifeless production are presuming—understandably—a morally abhorrent film cannot possibly have redeeming artistic merit." However, Culbert argues that, while one can understand such reasoning, it is actually a fallacy. He argues that those who dismiss Harlan as a "loud-mouthed opportunist who could direct crowd scenes" have failed to understand the structure of the script whose brilliance is due to Harlan rather than to his predecessors, Metzger and Möller. Culbert attributes much of the film's success to Marian's performance. He describes Marian as making use of "techniques and gestures perfected in his stage portrayal of Iago (in Shakespeare's Othello)". According to Culbert, "the construction of [Harlan's] plot owes much to Shakespeare."

=== Recent documentary and feature films ===
From the early 21st century the film became the subject of a number of documentary films. In 2001 Horst Königstein made a film titled Jud Süß—Ein Film als Verbrechen? (Jud Süß—A Film as a Crime?). The 2008 documentary Harlan – In the Shadow of Jew Süss by Felix Moeller explores Harlan's motivations and the post-war reaction of his large family to his notoriety. In 2010, Oskar Roehler directed a film titled Jew Suss: Rise and Fall (German: Jud Süss: Film ohne Gewissen, Jud Süss—film without conscience) that premiered at the 2010 Berlinale, receiving mixed reviews. It dramatizes the involvement of Austrian actor Ferdinand Marian who initially turns down the role, but then gives in to Goebbels' pressure and the promise of fame.

== See also ==
- Der Ewige Jude (The Eternal Jew), another example of a historical documentary and antisemitic Nazi film propaganda
- List of German films 1933–1945
- Nazism and cinema

== Works cited ==
- Niven, Bill (2018). Hitler and Film: The Führer's Hidden Passion. Yale University Press. ISBN 9780300200362.
- Welch, David (1983). Propaganda and the German Cinema: 1933-1945. I.B. Tauris. ISBN 9781860645204.

== Sources ==
- Fox, Jo (2000). Filming Women in the Third Reich. Oxford: Berg. ISBN 978-1-85973-396-7.
- Haggith, Toby; Newman, Joanna (2005). Holocaust and the Moving Image: Representations in Film and Television Since 1933. London: Wallflower Press. ISBN 978-1-904764-51-9.
- Haines, B.; Parker, S. (17 March 2010). Aesthetics and Politics in Modern German Culture. Oxford: Peter Lang. ISBN 978-3-03911-355-2.
- Hull, David Stewart (1969). Film in the Third Reich: A Study of the German Cinema, 1933–1945. Berkeley: University of California Press. ISBN 978-0-520-01489-3.
- Nelson, Anne (2009). Red Orchestra: The Story of the Berlin Underground and the circle of Friends Who Resisted Hitler. New York: Random House Digital, Inc. ISBN 978-1-4000-6000-9.
- Rentschler, Eric (1996). The Ministry of Illusion: Nazi Cinema and Its Afterlife. Cambridge, MA: Harvard University Press. ISBN 978-0-674-57640-7.
- Winkler, Willi (18 September 2009), "Eine Kerze für Veit Harlan" (in German), Süddeutsche Zeitung.
