= Seuss (surname) =

Seuss is a surname. Notable people with the surname include:

- Andy Seuss (born 1987), NASCAR racer
- Diane Seuss (born 1956), American poet and educator
- Dr. Seuss (Theodor Seuss Geisel) (1904–1991), American children's author, political cartoonist, and illustrator

== See also ==
- Suess (disambiguation)
