= 12002 Suess =

Main-belt asteroid

Discovery
- Discovered by: P. Pravec; L. Kotková (Šarounová)
- Discovery site: Ondřejov Obs.
- Discovery date: 19 March 1996

Designations
- Named after: Franz Eduard Suess (Austrian geologist)
- Alternative designations: 1996 FR_{1}
- Minor planet category: main-belt · (outer); Eos

Orbital characteristics
- Epoch 4 September 2017 (JD 2458000.5)
- Uncertainty parameter 0
- Observation arc: 34.49 yr (12,598 days)
- Aphelion: 3.3477 AU
- Perihelion: 2.6934 AU
- Semi-major axis: 3.0205 AU
- Eccentricity: 0.1083
- Orbital period (sidereal): 5.25 yr (1,917 days)
- Mean anomaly: 270.14°
- Mean motion: 0° 11^{m} 15.72^{s} / day
- Inclination: 9.4290°
- Longitude of ascending node: 216.62°
- Argument of perihelion: 98.262°

Physical characteristics
- Dimensions: 6.309±0.347 km
- Geometric albedo: 0.177±0.032
- Absolute magnitude (H): 13.6

12002 Suess, provisional designation 1996 FR_{1}, is an Eoan asteroid from the outer regions of the asteroid belt, about 6 km (3.7 mi) in diameter. It was discovered by Czech astronomers Petr Pravec and Lenka Kotková (Šarounová) at Ondřejov Observatory on 19 March 1996. The asteroid was named after Austrian geologist Franz Eduard Suess, following a suggestion by Herbert Raab.

== Orbit and classification ==
Suess is a member of the Eos family (606), the largest asteroid family in the outer main belt consisting of nearly 10,000 asteroids. It orbits the Sun at a distance of 2.7–3.3 AU once every 5 years and 3 months (1,917 days). Its orbit has an eccentricity of 0.11 and an inclination of 9° with respect to the ecliptic.

The body's observation arc begins with a precovery taken by the Digitized Sky Survey at the Siding Spring Observatory in November 1982, almost 14 years prior to its official discovery observation at Ondřejov .

== Physical characteristics ==
=== Diameter and albedo ===
According to the survey carried out by the NEOWISE mission of NASA's Wide-field Infrared Survey Explorer, Suess measures 6.309 km in diameter and its surface has an albedo of 0.177.

=== Lightcurves ===
As of 2017, no rotational lightcurve of Suess has been obtained from photometric observations. The asteroid's rotation period, poles, and shape remain unknown.

== Naming ==
This minor planet was named after Austrian geologist Franz Eduard Suess (1867–1941/2), son of geologist Eduard Suess and professor at the Technical College in Prague and superintendent at the Imperial Geological Institute of Vienna. Franz Eduard made fundamental studies on moldavites and coined the term "tektite", which are ejecta from meteor impact events. The official naming citation was published by the Minor Planet Center on 24 January 2000 (M.P.C. 38201). The lunar crater Suess, as well as the crater Suess on Mars, however, are named after his father.
