= Suss (disambiguation) =

SUSS is the Singapore University of Social Sciences.

SUSS, Suss or Süss may refer to:

== People ==
- Süß, a German surname sometimes presented as Süss in English, including a list of people with the name
- Esther Süss (born 1974), Swiss mountain biker
- Thomas Süss (born 1962), German footballer
- Wilhelm Süss (1895–1958), mathematician

== Other uses ==
- SÜSS MicroTec, German semiconductor company
- "Suss", a word deriving from the Sus law in England and Wales

== See also ==
- SUS (disambiguation)
- Suess (disambiguation), a translation of German Süss in English
