= Süß =

Süß (often transliterated into English: Suess, also sometimes Süss in German) is a German surname that means sweet.

People with the name include:

- Joseph Süß Oppenheimer (1698-1738), German-Jewish banker
  - Jud Süß (disambiguation), literary and dramatic works about Joseph Süß Oppenheimer
- Christoph Süß (1967), German comedian
- Christian Süß (1985), German table tennis player at the 2008 Summer Olympics in Beijing
- Wilhelm Süss, mathematician

== See also ==
- Suss (disambiguation)
- Suess (disambiguation)
- Jud Süß (disambiguation)
- Sub (disambiguation)
