= Judd (name) =

Judd is a name. Notable people with the name include:

== Surname ==
=== Academics ===
- Charles Hubbard Judd (1873–1946), America educational psychologist
- John Wesley Judd (1840–1916), British geologist
- Kenneth Judd (born 1953), American computational economist
- Walter Stephen Judd (born 1951), American botanist and taxonomist

=== Athletes ===
- Chris Judd (born 1983), Australian rules footballer
- Oscar Judd (1908–1995), Canadian baseball player
- Sid Judd (1928–1959), Welsh rugby union player
- Walter Judd (footballer) (1926–1964), English footballer

=== In film and television ===
- Ashley Judd (born 1968), American actress, daughter of Naomi Judd
- Phil Judd (sound engineer) (born 1948), worked on many films in Australia and US
- Lesley Judd (born 1946), British television presenter

=== In music ===
- Cledus T. Judd, stage name of American country music singer and entertainer born Barry Poole (born 1964)
- Harry Judd (born 1985), drummer in pop band McFly
- James Judd (born 1949), British conductor
- Naomi Judd (1946-2022), American country singer and one-half of The Judds
- Phil Judd (born 1953), founding member of New Zealand band Split Enz
- Terence Judd (1957–1979), English pianist
- Wynonna Judd (born 1964), American country singer; daughter of Naomi and the other half of The Judds

=== Politicians ===
- Catherine Judd, former President of the ACT New Zealand political party
- Bing Judd, American politician
- Frank Judd, Baron Judd (1935–2021), Labour Party politician and Cabinet minister in the United Kingdom
- Lawrence M. Judd (1887–1968), seventh Territorial Governor of Hawaii
- Norman B. Judd (1815–1878), American politician and envoy/ambassador to Prussia
- Stoddard Judd (1797–1873), American physician and politician
- Truman H. Judd (1817–1884), American politician
- Walter Judd (politician) (1898–1994), American politician and physician

=== In religion ===
- The Reverend Bernard Judd (1918–1999), Anglican minister in Sydney, Australia
- Gerrit P. Judd (1803–1873), American missionary to Hawaii

=== Criminals ===
- Keith Judd (born 1958), American perennial candidate for political office and convicted criminal
- Winnie Ruth Judd (1905–1998), the Arizona Trunk Murderess

=== Other ===
- Alan Judd (born 1946), English writer
- Alice Louise Judd Simpich (1918–2006), American sculptor
- Bettina Judd, American poet and artist
- Donald Judd (1928–1994), American minimalist artist
- Ernie Judd (1883–1959), Australian bookseller and socialist
- Ida Benfey Judd (died 1952), American educator
- Mary Catherine Judd (1852–1930s), American author and educator
- John Judd (born 1942), British automotive engineer
- Sarah Ford Judd (1854–1921), American clubwoman
- Sylvester Judd (1813–1853), novelist

== Given name ==
- Judd Apatow (born 1967), American producer, writer, director, actor and comedian
- Judd Blackwater (born 1987), Canadian professional ice hockey player
- Judd Caulfield (born 2001), American ice hockey player
- Judd Ehrlich (born 1971), American documentary film director and producer
- Judd Garrett (born 1967), American former football running back
- Judd Greenstein (born 1979), American composer
- Judd Alan Gregg (born 1947), American politician and lawyer
- Judd Hamilton, American singer and musician
- Judd Henkes (born 2001), American snowboarder
- Judd Hirsch (born 1935), American actor
- Judd Holdren (1915–1974), American film actor
- Judd Lalich (born 1975), Australian former rules footballer
- Judd Lander (born 1948), English harmonicist
- Judd Legum (born 1978), American journalist
- Judd Lynn (born 1961), American television writer
- Judd Marmor (1910–2003), American psychoanalyst and psychiatrist
- Judd Nelson (born 1959), American actor, screenwriter and producer
- Judd Rose (1955–2000), American television journalist
- Judd Sirott (born 1969), American sportscaster
- Judd L. Teller (1912–1972), American author and historian
- Judd Trichter, American writer and former actor
- Judd Trump (born 1989), English snooker player
- Judd Tully, American art critic
- Judd Winick (born 1970), American cartoonist and writer
- Judd Woldin (1925–2011), American composer
