= Eduard Suess =

Austrian geologist (1831–1914)

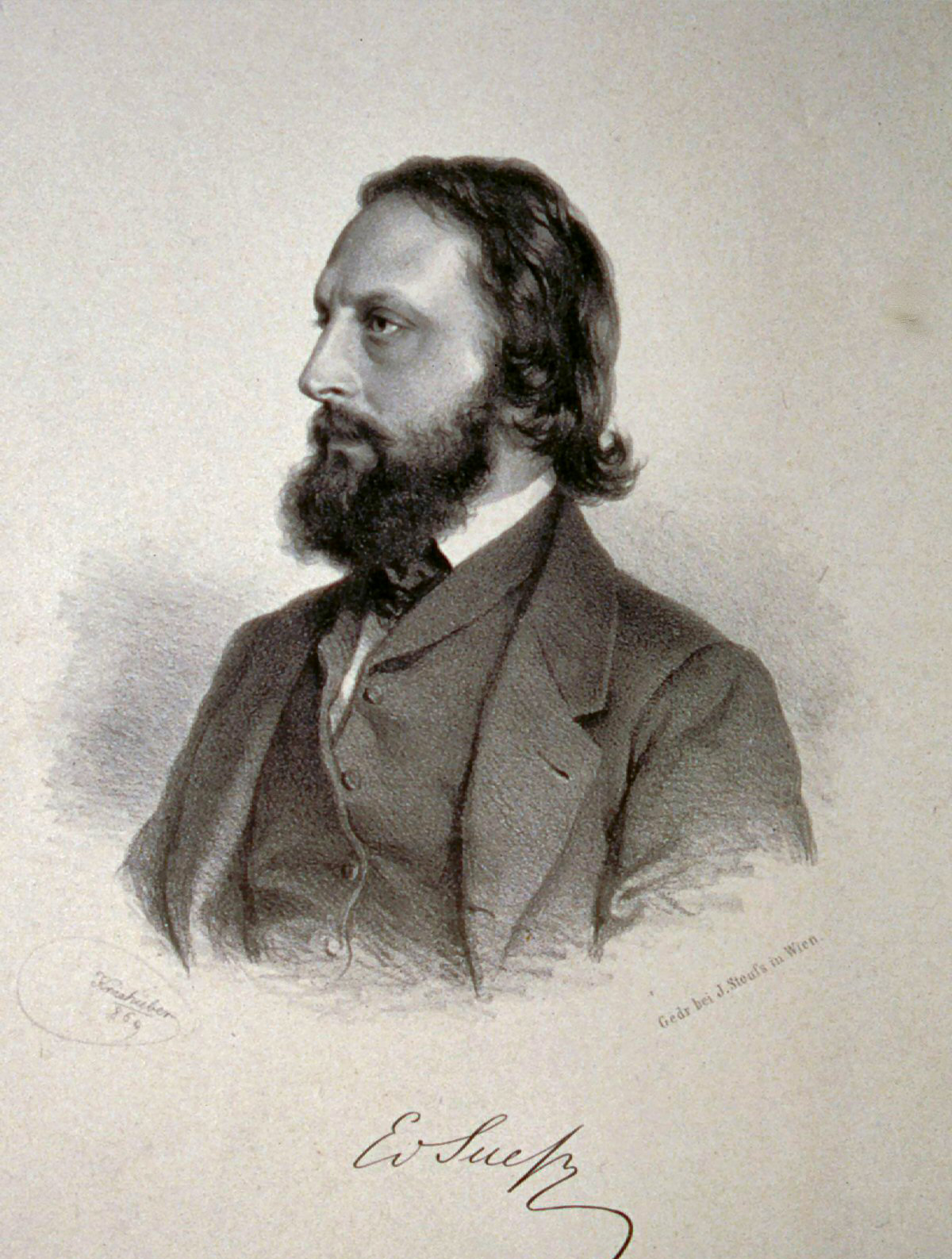
- Eduard Suess, 1869
- Born: 20 August 1831; London, England
- Died: 26 April 1914 (aged 82); Vienna, Austria
- Resting place: Marz, Austria-Hungary; 47°43′6.991″N 16°24′57.932″E
- Education: University of Vienna
- Known for: Biosphere, Gondwana, Tethys Ocean, Das Antlitz der Erde, eustatic theory, sima, sial
- Spouse: Hermine née Strauss
- Children: 5 sons, 1 daughter
- Awards: Hayden Memorial Geological Award (1892); Wollaston Medal (1896); Copley Medal (1903)
- Scientific career
- Fields: Palaeogeography, tectonics
- Doctoral students: Melchior Neumayr; Johann August Georg Edmund Mojsisovics von Mojsvar; Fuchs; Wilhelm Heinrich Waagen; Albrecht Penck

Eduard Suess (Austrian German: [ˈeːdu.ard ˈsyːs]; 20 August 1831 – 26 April 1914) was an Austrian geologist and a specialist on the geography of the Alps. He is responsible for hypothesising two major former geographical features, the supercontinent Gondwana (proposed in 1861) and the Tethys Ocean. He also introduced the concepts of eustasy. As a professor of geology at the University of Vienna, he was a founding figure in geology in Austria, influencing numerous geologists across Europe. He was considered the "dean of geology" at the beginning of the twentieth century. He was also an Austrian parliament representative for the liberal party.

== Biography ==
Eduard Suess was born on 20 August 1831 in London, England, the oldest son of Adolph Heinrich Suess, a Lutheran Saxon wool merchant, and mother Eleonore Friederike Zdekauer. Adolph Heinrich Suess was born on 11 March 1797 in Saxony and died on 24 May 1862 in Vienna, he had studied theology before moving to business; Eleonore Friederike Zdekauer was born in Prague, now part of the Czech Republic, which once belonged to the Holy Roman Empire and the Austrian Empire. The Zdekauers were a wealthy Jewish origin banking family in Prague who had converted to Lutheranism.

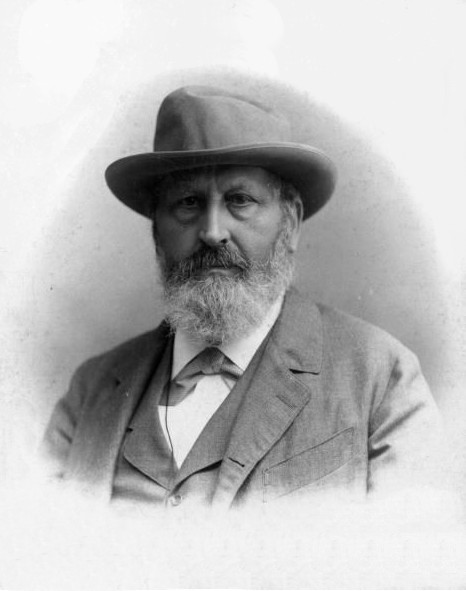
Eduard Suess, c. 1890

When Eduard Suess was an infant of three, his family relocated to Prague, and then to Vienna to manage a leather factory of an ailing uncle when he was 14. They had an English nurse and later a French and German instructor which made Eduard trilingual at a young age. He became interested in geology at a young age. He studied at the Clementinum and Akademisches Gymnasium before going in 1846 to the Vienna Polytechnic Institute and in 1848, during an uprising, he became part of the Academic Legion and stood guard in front a bank. Following the failed revolution, Suess' father sent off his son to Prague to avoid any possible repercussions. On a visit to the museum in Prague he saw Paleozoic fossils collected from the region. Some illness of the liver forced him to visit the Karlsbad spa region and he examined the geology and published a booklet on it in 1851 as an 18 year-old. He met the museum curator Maxmilián ‘Max’ Dormitzer and joined him on excursions. He also made contact with Joachim Barrande (1799-1883). His role in the revolution however led to a police summons and he spent a month in prison. He left studies at the polytechnic and joined as a salaried assistant in the Hofmineralienkabinett under Paul Maria Partsch (1791-1856). He also published his first paper—on the geology of Carlsbad (now Karlovy Vary in the Czech Republic). His first assignment was the reorganization of the brachiopod collection. By 1855 he had published 10 papers in paleontology. He also made a trip into the alps as an assistant to Franz von Hauer (1822-1899) in the Alps and collected fossils. He also noticed identical deformations in sedimentary and igneous rocks that did not fit with contemporary views on the formation of the Alps. He would later, eight years later, take two of his favorite students, Ferdinand Stoliczka (1838-1874) and Edmund Mojsisovics Edler von Mojsvar (1839-1907) to the same site and publish on the topic. In 1854 he visited Peter Merian (1795-1883), Bernhard Studer (1794-1887) and Arnold Escher von der Linth (1807-1872) in Switzerland. Escher showed Suess the "Glarus loop" on the way back. He visited Paris, meeting Gérard Paul Deshayes (1795-1875) and Élie de Beaumont (1798-1874) and then Albert Oppel (1831-1865) in Germany. Oppel showed him Jurassic material from near Stuttgart.

In 1855, Suess married Hermine Strauss (1835-1898), the daughter of a prominent physician from Prague and also a niece of Moritz Hörnes. Their marriage produced five sons and one daughter.

Hörnes became the director of the Hofmineralienkabinett after the death of Partsch in 1856 and with letters from him and others, Suess applied for a Privatdozent position at the University of Vienna which was dismissed as he did not have a doctorate, and worse, not even a university degree. He wrote a letter to the minister Count Leo of Thun and Hohenstein (1811-1888) who examined the position and said that he was indeed unqualified to be a privatdozent but that he could be made a professor. So, in 1856, he was appointed as an unsalaried professor of paleontology at the University of Vienna, and in 1861 was appointed professor of geology. He made use of the material in the mineral cabinet as well as excursions for his teachings. He gradually developed views on the connection between Africa and Europe. Eventually, he concluded that the Alps to the north were once at the bottom of an ocean, of which the Mediterranean was a remnant. In his book Die Entstehung der Alpen (The Origin of the Alps, 1875) he pointed out that mountains were produced not by upward flow of magma but by lateral compression. Suess was not entirely correct in his analysis, which was predicated upon the notion of "contractionism"—the idea that the Earth is cooling down and, therefore, contracting. Nevertheless, he is credited with postulating the earlier existence of the Tethys Ocean, which he named in 1893. He claimed in 1885 that land bridges had connected South America, Africa, India, Australia, and Antarctica, creating a supercontinent which he named Gondwanaland.

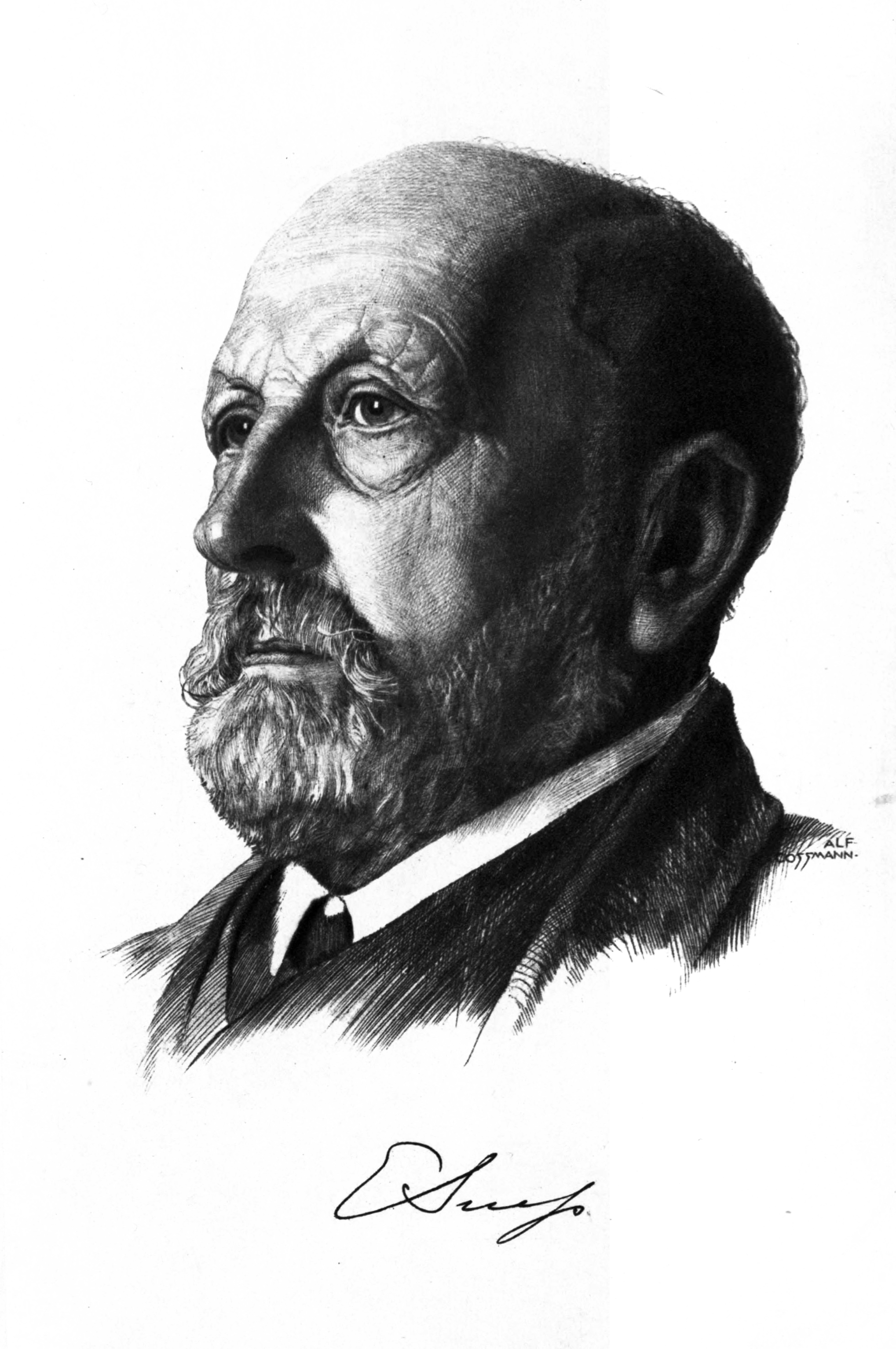
In old age

Suess published a comprehensive synthesis of his ideas between 1885 and 1901 titled Das Antlitz der Erde (The Face of the Earth), which was a popular textbook for many years. The German edition was published in five volumes numbered as 1A, 1B, 2, 3-1, 3-2 and an index. Suess set out his belief that across geologic time, the rise and fall of sea levels were mappable across the earth—that is, that the periods of ocean transgression and regression were correlateable from one continent to another and thus global phenomena. His theory was based upon glossopteris fern fossils occurring in South America, Africa, and India. His explanation was that the three lands were once connected in a supercontinent, which he named Gondwanaland. Suess believed that the oceans flooded the spaces currently between those lands. He used the word eustasy and eustatic sea-level changes or “eustatic movements” (“eustatische Bewegungen”) in 1888 which was translated into English in 1906. He considered the sinking of ocean basis for negative eustasis and the filling by sediments as cause for positive eustasis. He did not consider the idea that ice may have compressed the land below but noticed marine shorelines high above Norwegian fjords and suggested that the sea level may have been higher in the ice age. In his time it was also ascribed to the gravitational pull of the ice masses on the poles. Suess mentioned ideas on 25,900 year climate cycles arising from an altered orbit around the sun and resulting changes in solar radiation.

Suess was also a member of the Austrian parliament as a representative of the liberal party. He stayed in the seat for 30 years until his retirement in 1896. As a parliamentarian he examined the policy of gold reserves and noted in his book Die Zukunft des Goldes (1877, [The future of gold]) that a scarcity of gold and an abundance of silver can be expected based on geology and that the gold standard might not work for all nations.In 1892 he wrote Die Zukunft des Silbers which was translated into English by the United States Senate in 1893. By this time his predictions on gold were holding but he pointed out that the government should stock a moderate amount of gold but not declare a gold standard or to fix an exchange ratio between the silver florin and gold coins.

In his work Die Entstehung der Alpen, Suess also introduced the concept of the biosphere, which was later extended by Vladimir I. Vernadsky in 1926. Suess wrote:

One thing seems to be foreign on this large celestial body consisting of spheres, namely, organic life. But this life is limited to a determined zone at the surface of the lithosphere. The plant, whose deep roots plunge into the soil to feed, and which at the same time rises into the air to breathe, is a good illustration of organic life in the region of interaction between the upper sphere and the lithosphere, and on the surface of continents it is possible to single out an independent biosphere.

He was elected a member of the American Philosophical Society in 1886 and the Royal Swedish Academy of Sciences in 1895. He received the Wollaston Medal of the Geological Society of London in 1896 and he won the Copley Medal of the Royal Society in 1903. Suess died on 26 April 1914 in Vienna. He is buried in the town of Marz in Burgenland, Austria. .

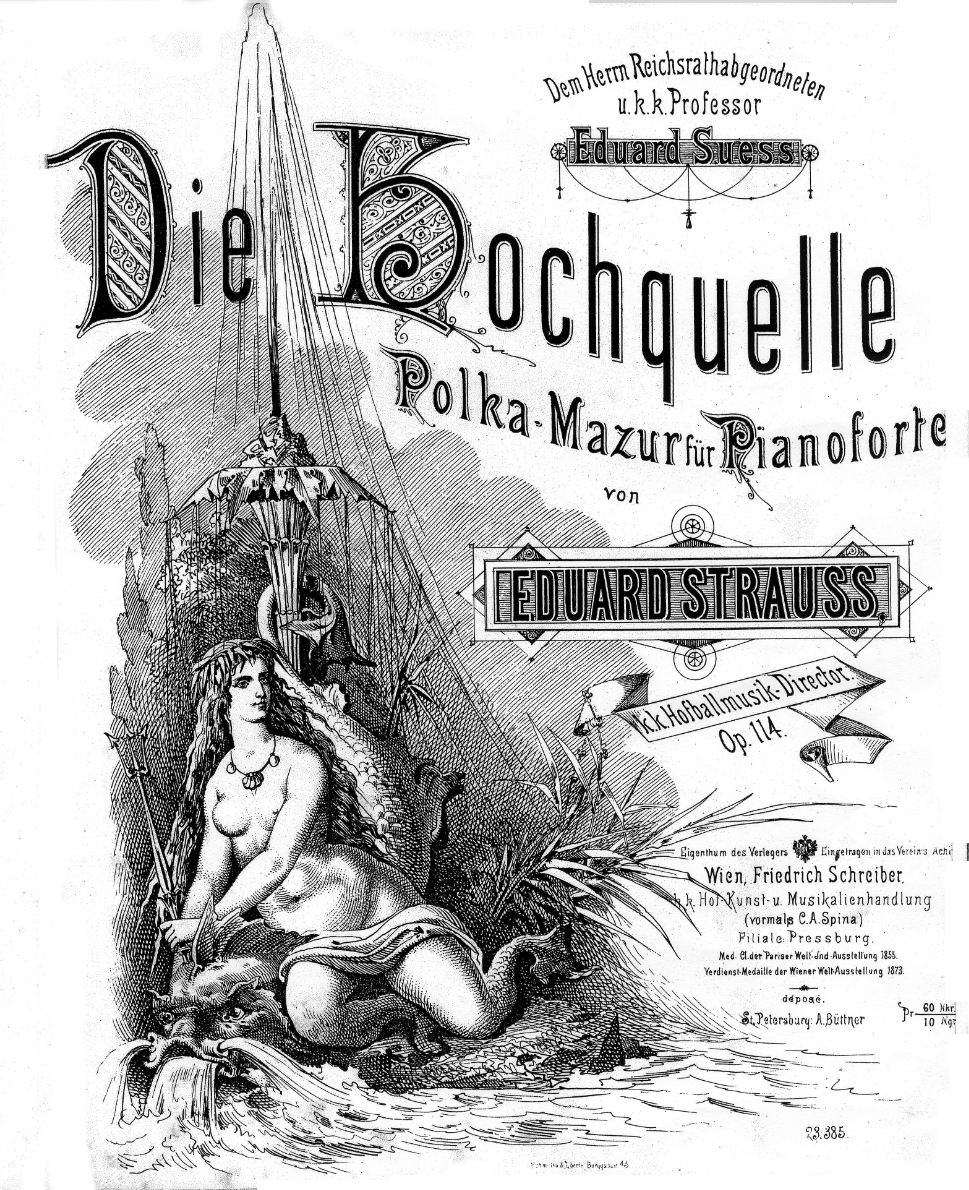
Cover of Die Hochquelle score (1874)

== Legacy ==
Suess is considered one of the early practitioners of ecology. Suess Land in Greenland, the lunar crater Suess, as well as the crater Suess on Mars, are named after him. In 1861, he was invited to examine the water supply of Vienna and its sanitary conditions. He examined the patterns of deaths from typhoid during an epidemic and suggested that water travelled through the cemetery which lay on high ground and mixed into the wells in the lower parts. He wrote his findings in an 1862 booklet Der Boden der Stadt Wien nach seiner Bildungsweise, Beschaffenheit und seinen Beziehungen zum Bürgerlichen Leben which became so popular that he was elected to the city council in 1863. He then suggested that drinking water be brought from further away by aqueducts to the city. This system was set up and inaugurated in 1873 and "Suess' water" was immortalized in Johann Strauss’ operetta Die Fledermaus. When the Vienna water system was inaugurated, a polka-mazur was composed by Eduard Strauss (1835-1916), and a letter from Strauss to Suess dated 30th April 1874 apologized for the delay in the publication of the musical score for "Die Hochquelle” [The Highspring]. Charles Schuchert (1858–1942) called him ‘dean of modern geology and geologists’ in 1914.

=== Franz Eduard Suess ===
His son, Franz Eduard Suess (1867–1941), was superintendent and geologist at the Imperial Geological Institute in Vienna, who studied moldavites and coined the term tektite. The asteroid 12002 Suess, discovered by Czech astronomers Petr Pravec and Lenka Kotková in 1996, was named in his honor.

== Works ==
- Zur Kenntniss des Stringocephalus Burtini Defrance (1853)
- Über die Brachiopoden der Kössener Schichten (1854)
- Der Boden der Stadt Wien Der Boden der Stadt Wien (1862)
- Die Entstehung der Alpen (1875)
- Das Antlitz der Erde in three volumes (1885–1909) volume 1 volume 2 Volume 3 part 1 Volume 3 part 2
  - La face de la terre, (1897–1918), translation de l'allemand par Emmanuel de Margerie, préface par Marcel Bertrand
  - The Face of the Earth, trans. of Das Antlitz der Erde in 5 vols. (1904–1924) Volume 1 Volume 2 Volume 3 Volume 4 Volume 5
- Erinnerungen (1916)
- The future of silver (1893, translated)
