= Joseph Süß Oppenheimer =

German banker

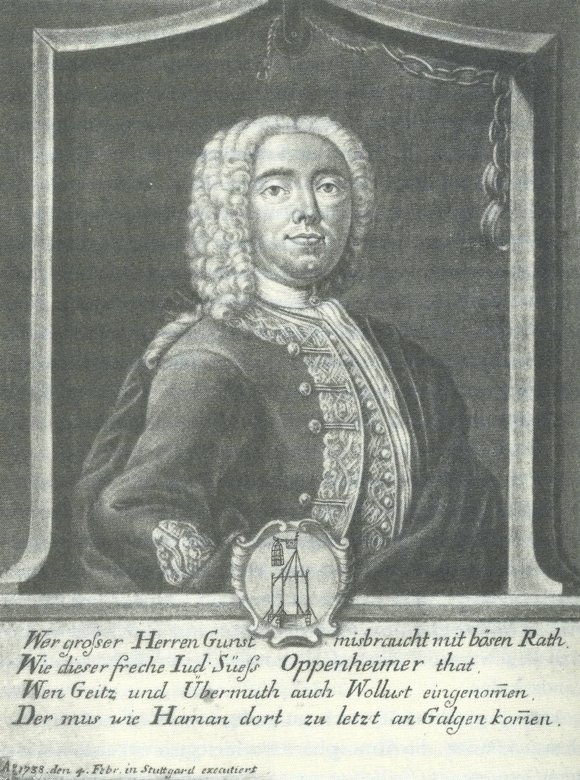
- Born: 1698 or 1699; Heidelberg, Electoral Palatinate
- Died: February 4, 1738 (aged 39); Stuttgart, Duchy of Württemberg
- Occupation: Court Jew

Joseph Süß Oppenheimer (c. 1698 – February 4, 1738) was a German banker who was court Jew for Charles Alexander, Duke of Württemberg, managing several of his enterprises. Throughout his career, Oppenheimer made scores of powerful enemies, some of whom conspired against him, leading to his arrest and execution after Charles Alexander's death.

In the centuries since his execution, Oppenheimer's rise and fall have been treated in two notable literary works, and his ordeal inspired two films, including the antisemitic production Jud Süß, released in Nazi Germany in 1940, itself the cause for a famous postwar trial.

== Career ==
Oppenheimer was born in Heidelberg to a Jewish tax collector and his wife. The father died early, and the exact whereabouts of Joseph Süß in the following years are not certain. By the 1720s, Oppenheimer was working as a court Jew in Mannheim, Darmstadt, and finally Frankfurt am Main. In Frankfurt he was introduced to Carl Alexander, the future Duke of Württemberg, in 1732. When Carl Alexander ascended the throne in the following year, Oppenheimer served as his chief financial adviser. As envoy to Frankfurt in 1733, his privileged position allowed him to live outside the Judengasse in the comfort of the Golden Swan Inn.

== Arrest, trial and execution ==
When his protector, Carl Alexander, suddenly died on March 12, 1737, Oppenheimer was arrested and accused of various crimes, including fraud, embezzlement, treason, lecherous relations with various women, and accepting bribes. While some Jews tried to help him during the trial, others gave incriminatory testimonies against him. The charge of lechery was dropped in order to protect reputable women.

After the heavily publicized trial, Oppenheimer was sentenced to death, without naming any specific crime. When his jailers asked that he convert to Christianity, he refused.

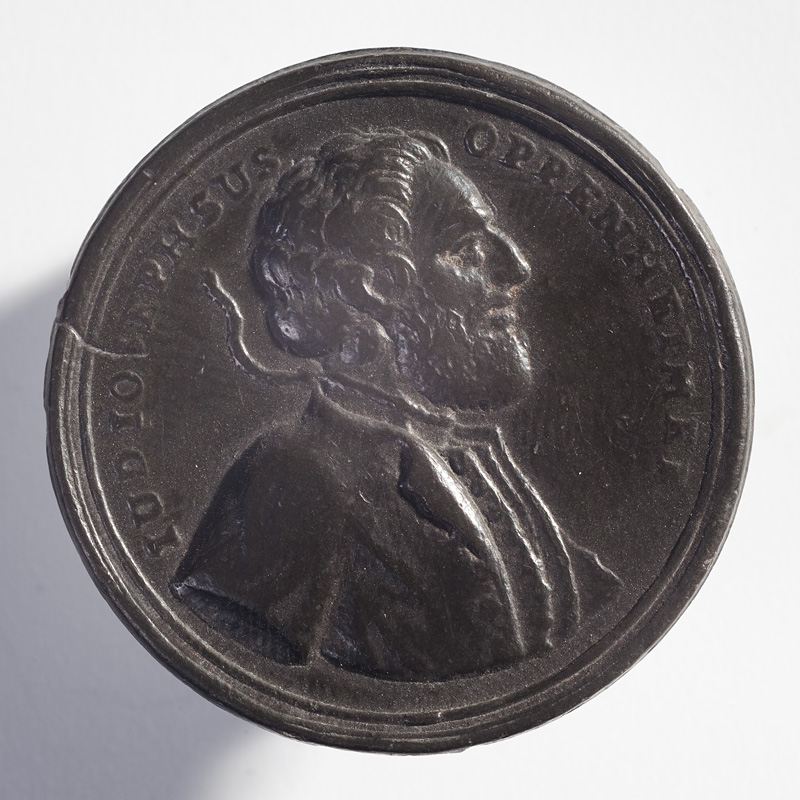
Satirical coin marked "Jud Joseph Sus Oppenheimer", executed in Stuttgart in 1738. In the collection of the Jewish Museum of Switzerland.

Engraving of Joseph Süß Oppenheimer's execution

Niall Ferguson writes that Süß-Oppenheimer was executed because his prosecutors found him guilty of wielding excessive political power and undermining the position of the Württemberg estates (Stände).

Joseph Süß Oppenheimer was led to the gallows on February 4, 1738, and given a final chance to convert to Christianity, which he refused to do. He was throttled, with his last words reportedly being the Jewish prayer, "Hear, O Israel: the Lord is our God, the Lord is one".

The case records were then declared secret until 1918. His corpse was gibbeted in a cage that hung outside of Stuttgart in the Pragsattel district for six years until the inauguration of Carl Eugen, Duke of Württemberg, who in his first act as ruler permitted the burial of his corpse below the gallows.

== In literature, art and film ==
The story of Joseph Süß Oppenheimer was the subject of a number of literary and dramatic treatments over the course of the past two centuries. The earliest of these was Wilhelm Hauff's 1827 novella titled Jud Süß. The most successful literary adaptation was Lion Feuchtwanger's 1925 novel titled Jud Süß based on a play that he had written in 1916 though never performed and subsequently withdrawn by Feuchtwanger.

Ashley Dukes and Paul Kornfeld also wrote dramatic adaptations of the Feuchtwanger novel. In 1934, Lothar Mendes directed a film adaptation of the novel in which Süß was portrayed by actor Conrad Veidt. An anti-semitic Nazi propaganda film titled Jud Süß was made in 1940 by Veit Harlan, in which Süß was portrayed by actor Ferdinand Marian.

In the 1990s, the German sculptor Angela Laich created a sculpture devoted to Joseph Süß Oppenheimer as well as illustrations for Hellmut G. Haasis's biography.

In 2016 the movie Norman was released, loosely inspired by Oppenheimer's life, starring Richard Gere.

== Biographies ==
Shortly after Feuchtwanger's novel was published, Selma Stern published a biography of Oppenheimer titled Jud Süß: Ein Beitrag zur deutschen und zur jüdischen Geschichte. More recently, Hellmut G. Haasis published a biography titled Joseph Süß Oppenheimer, genannt Jud Süß: Finanzier, Freidenker, Justizopfer. It is still the standard work on the topic. In 2017, Yair Mintzker, a history professor at Princeton University, published a new account of Oppenheimer's trial, The Many Deaths of Jew Süss, which is the most comprehensive treatment of Oppenheimer's trial available in English.
