= Suess (lunar crater) =

Crater on the Moon

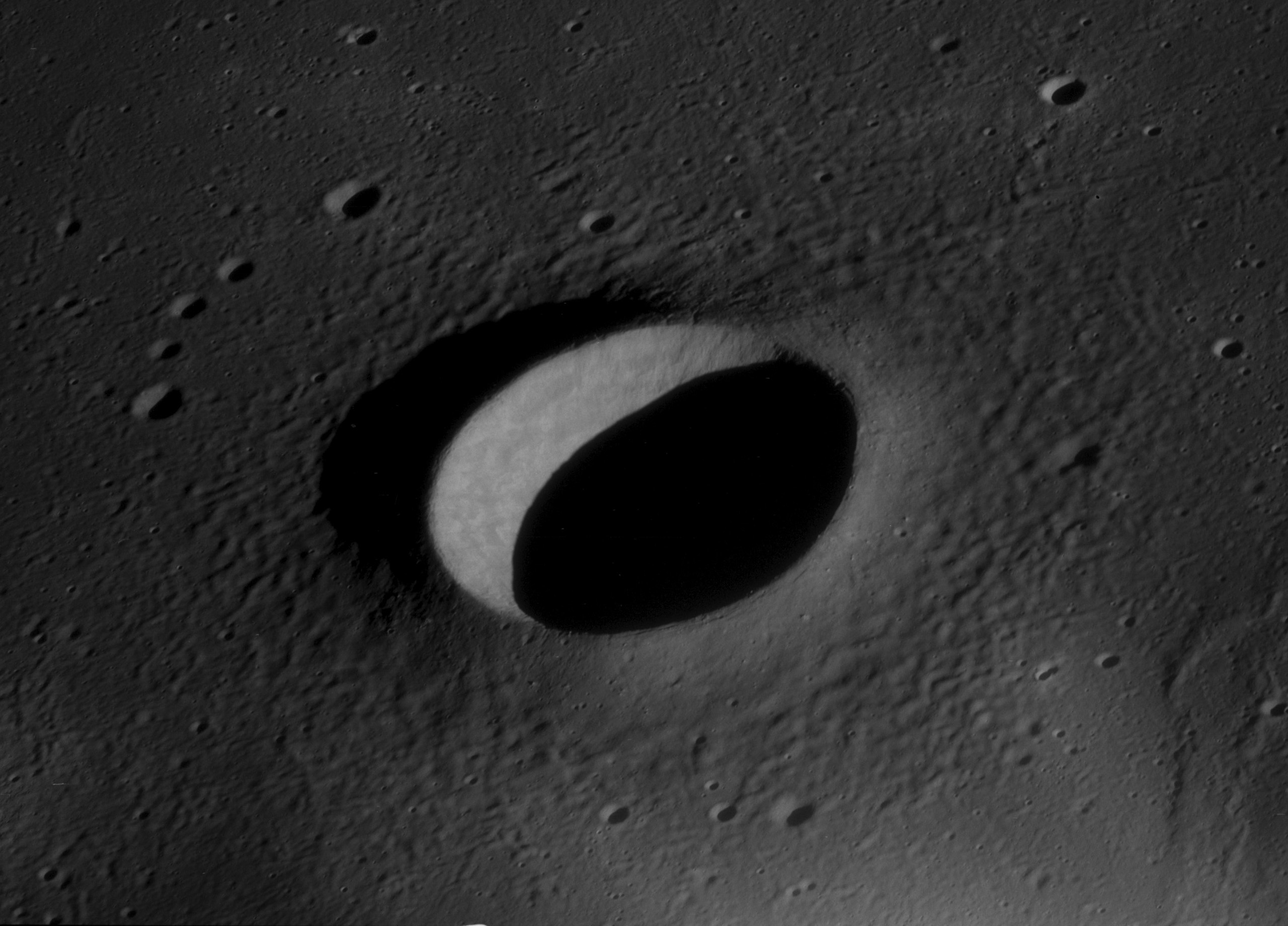
- Apollo 12 image, showing the crater's hummocky ejecta surrounding the rim
- Coordinates: 4.4°N 47.6°W
- Diameter: 9 km
- Depth: 0.5 km
- Colongitude: 48° at sunrise
- Eponym: Eduard Suess

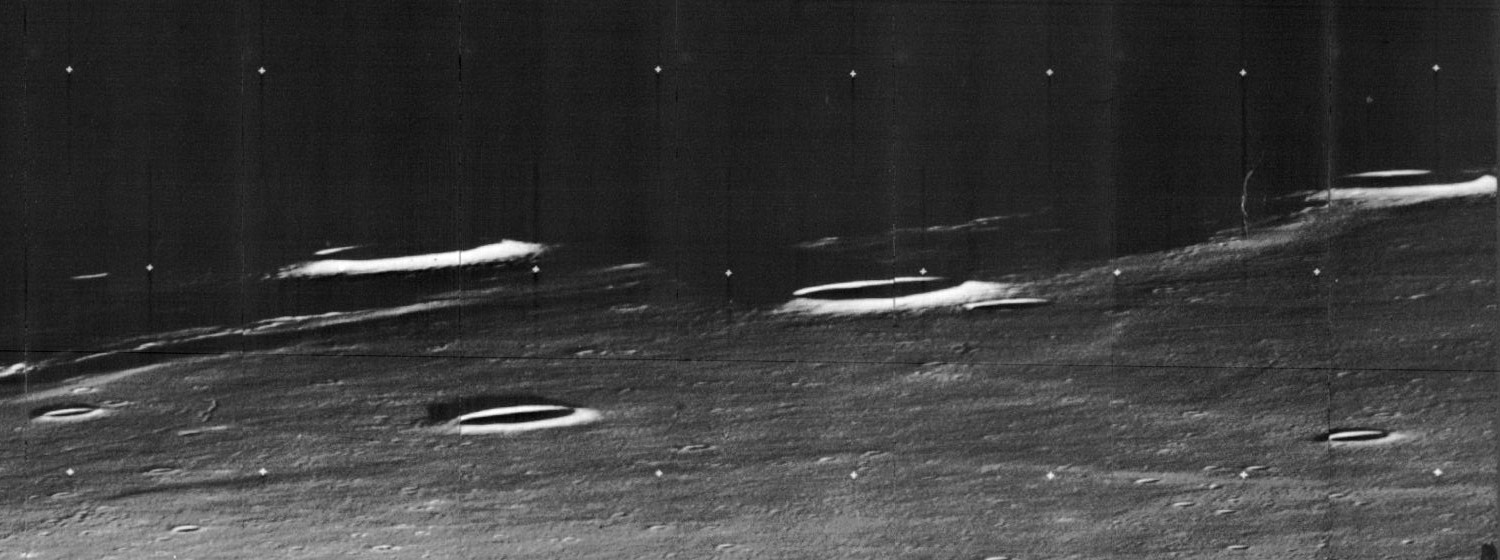
Oblique view of Suess (upper left) and its satellite craters H, D, and B, while at the terminator, from Lunar Orbiter 3

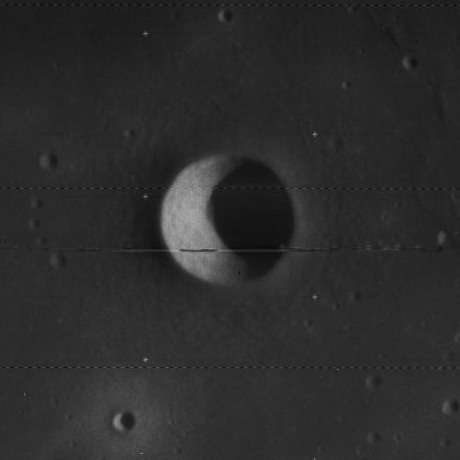
Lunar Orbiter 4 image

Suess is a small lunar impact crater on the Oceanus Procellarum. It is a circular, cup-shaped feature with a higher albedo than the surroundings. The closest significant crater is Reiner, about 150 kilometers to the west-northwest. The lunar mare that surrounds Suess is marked by the rays radiating from the crater Kepler to the east-northeast.

The long, sinuous rille named Rima Suess begins about 30 kilometers to the east of Suess, and winds its way in a generally north-northwesterly direction for a length of almost 200 kilometers.

== Satellite craters ==
By convention, these features are identified on lunar maps by placing the letter on the side of the crater midpoint that is closest to Suess.

Suess	Latitude	Longitude	Diameter
B	5.7° N	47.3° W	8 km
D	4.7° N	46.5° W	7 km
F	1.1° N	44.6° W	7 km
G	3.4° N	48.4° W	4 km
H	4.0° N	45.7° W	4 km
J	6.9° N	48.5° W	3 km
K	6.5° N	50.0° W	3 km
L	6.1° N	50.5° W	5 km

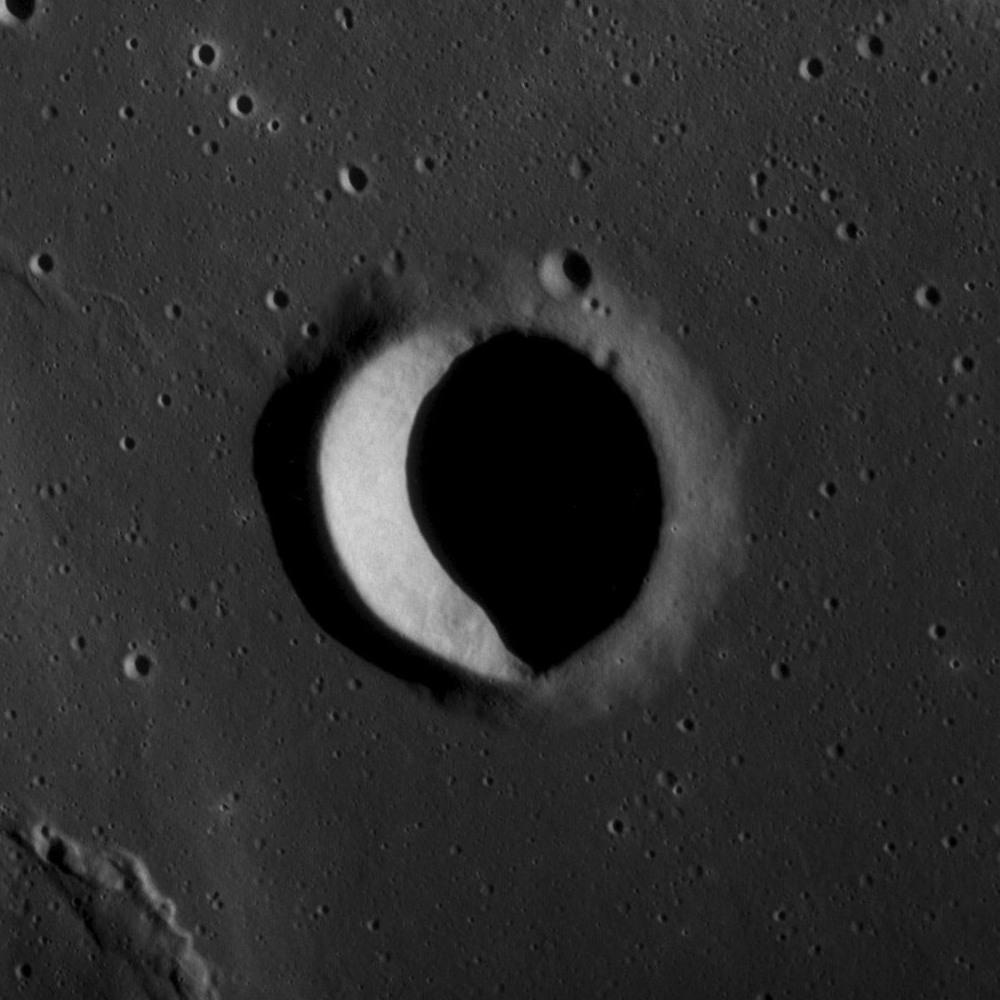
Suess F crater (Apollo 12)
