= Jew Süss (1934 film) =

- 1934 UK cinema poster
- Directed by: Lothar Mendes
- Screenplay by: Dorothy Farnum; A. R. Rawlinson
- Based on: Jud Süß by Lion Feuchtwanger
- Produced by: Michael Balcon
- Starring: Conrad Veidt
- Music by: Jack Beaver; Bretton Byrd; Charles Williams
- Distributed by: Gaumont-British
- Release dates: 4 October 1934 (UK & US); 1 November 1934 (US wide)
- Running time: 105 minutes
- Country: United Kingdom
- Language: English
- Budget: £120,000 or £100,000

Jew Süss is a 1934 British historical romantic drama film based on Lion Feuchtwanger's 1925 novel Jud Süß, about Joseph Süß Oppenheimer. Directed by Lothar Mendes, the film stars German actor Conrad Veidt in the role of Oppenheimer. The screenplay was written by Dorothy Farnum and Arthur Rawlinson.

Unlike the Nazis' antisemitic propaganda film Jud Süß (1940), the British film was intended to be sympathetic to Jews, and is generally considered to be a faithful adaptation of Feuchtwanger's novel. It was hoped the historical analogy, condemning antisemitism in 1730, would be a successful means of evading the ban by the British censors on political topics in films.

The latter film with the same title, produced in Nazi Germany, is considered by some to be an antisemitic response to Mendes' philosemitic film.

== Plot ==
In Württemberg in 1730, Jews are confined to a ghetto and subject to restrictions on where they may live and conduct business. Josef Süss Oppenheimer, a wealthy and ambitious Jewish financier, hopes to gain enough political influence to improve their position, while also desiring power and social advancement for himself.

While traveling with his friend Landauer, Süss encounters Karl Alexander, cousin of the reigning Duke of Württemberg. Learning that Karl is short of money, Süss lends him financial assistance and makes himself useful to him. Süss's uncle, Rabbi Gabriel, predicts that Karl will become Duke, and after the deaths of those ahead of him in the succession, Karl unexpectedly inherits the title. Süss becomes his financial adviser and uses his growing influence to secure greater freedoms for the Jewish population.

Karl's extravagant court, military ambitions, and personal spending require increasingly large sums of money, making him dependent upon Süss. As Süss rises in wealth and status, he moves away from the ghetto and becomes absorbed in court life. He is attracted to Magdalen Sibylle, the daughter of council president Weissensee, but reluctantly assists Karl when the Duke develops an interest in her.

The privileges obtained by Süss for the Jews provoke resentment among parts of the Christian population. Tensions intensify when a Jewish man, Seligman, is accused of murdering a Christian child for ritual purposes after a bloodstained cloth is discovered. Süss appeals to Karl on Seligman's behalf and threatens to resign unless he is pardoned. The Duke relents, and Süss is celebrated on his return to the ghetto.

Rabbi Gabriel subsequently reveals letters indicating that Süss's biological father was a Christian nobleman. Although this discovery could allow Süss to escape the restrictions imposed upon Jews, he continues to identify with the Jewish community. Meanwhile, Karl encounters Süss's young daughter, Naomi, whose existence Süss has deliberately concealed from him because of the Duke's reputation with women. When Karl later pursues Naomi, she flees onto a rooftop and falls to her death while attempting to escape him.

Devastated, Süss blames Karl for Naomi's death but outwardly remains in his service. Karl, seeking to ensure his silence, grants him even greater authority over the state's finances. Süss resolves to use this power to destroy the Duke. He imposes severe taxes and encourages Karl to disregard Württemberg's constitution, suppress opposition, and use the army to establish himself as an absolute ruler. These policies turn the population against Karl and bring him into conflict with the governing council.

As Karl prepares to seize power, he orders the arrest of his opponents and secretly adds Süss's name to the list. Warned of the betrayal by Magdalen, Süss nevertheless continues with his plan. He finally reveals to Karl that the attempted coup has failed and that he deliberately engineered the Duke's downfall in revenge for Naomi. Overcome by the revelation, Karl dies.

With the Duke dead and the coup defeated, Süss allows himself to be arrested rather than flee. At his trial, the authorities struggle to find grounds on which to condemn him before invoking a law forbidding sexual relations between Jews and Christians. He is sentenced to death.

Süss is placed inside an iron cage suspended above a crowd, with a noose around his neck. As a group of Jews recite the Shema Yisrael, Süss joins them in prayer. The trap beneath him is released and he is hanged. The film concludes with the hope that the barriers dividing Jews and Christians may one day disappear.

== Cast ==
- Conrad Veidt as Josef Süss Oppenheimer
- Benita Hume as Marie Auguste
- Frank Vosper as Karl Alexander
- Cedric Hardwicke as Rabbi Gabriel
- Gerald du Maurier as Weissensee
- Paul Graetz as Landauer
- Joan Maude as Magdalen Sibylle
- Pamela Mason as Naomi
- Haidée Wright as Michelle Süss
- Eva Moore as Jantje
- Campbell Gulan as the Prince of Thurn and Taxis
- Sam Livesey as Harprecht
- Joseph Markovitch as Seligman
- Selma Vaz Dias as Frau Seligman
- Lucius Blake as Ottman
- Marcelle Rogez as Graziella
- Randle Ayrton as Schoolmaster
- P. Kynaston Reeves as Judge
- Percy Parsons as Pflug
- James Raglan as Lord Suffolk
- Dennis Hoey as Dieterle
- Hay Plumb as Pfaeffle
- Francis L. Sullivan as Remchingen

== Release ==
The film premiered simultaneously at the Tivoli Cinema on the Strand in London and Radio City Music Hall in New York on 4 October 1934, with Prince George and Queen Maria of Romania being the guests of honour at the UK premiere. A blurry telephoto picture of Prince George attending the London premiere was shown for the audience in New York, which – due to the time zone difference – saw the film some five hours later. According to The Times correspondent, "the reproduction was indistinct, but the picture was notable as the first attempt to use a radio photograph (see wirephoto) on the screen". The film was retitled Power for the US release.
