= Jud Süß (Hauff novel) =

1827 novella by Wilhelm Hauff

- Author: Wilhelm Hauff
- Language: German
- Genre: Novella
- Publication date: 1827
- Publication place: Kingdom of Württemberg
- Media type: Print (hardback and paperback)

Jud Süß is an early 19th century novella by Wilhelm Hauff based on the early 18th century German Jewish banker and financial adviser Joseph Süß Oppenheimer. In Hauff's novella, Joseph Süß Oppenheimer is the flamboyant Jewish finance minister of Charles Alexander, Duke of Württemberg; his policies based on corruption and intimidations made him hated by the Christian community. At the Duke's sudden death, he is arrested and sentenced to be hanged in an iron cage and die a horrible death. His daughter who is left penniless drowns herself in the Neckar. Lion Feuchtwanger characterized Hauff's novella as "naïvely anti-Semitic".
