= Ernst Petersen =

German architect and actor

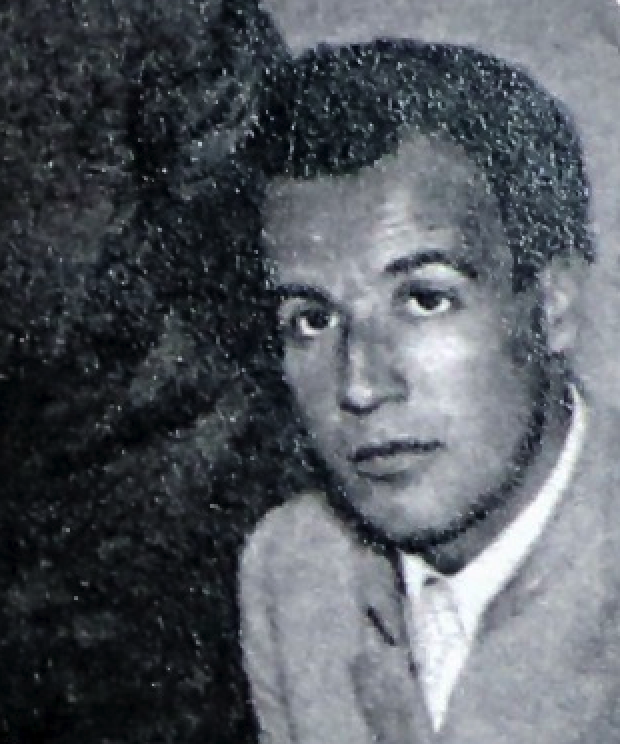
- Ernst Petersen on the occasion of the award of the Great State Prize of the Prussian Academy of Arts for Architects, 1937
- Born: 6 June 1906; Freiburg im Breisgau, German Empire
- Died: 30 March 1959 (aged 52); Ihringen, West German
- Occupations: Actor, architect
- Years active: 1931–1957
- Spouse: Elisabeth Henkel
- Children: Anette Brandhorst

Ernst Petersen (6 June 1906 – 30 March 1959) was a German architect and actor. Although Petersen was very successful as an architect and several of his buildings are now listed as historical monuments, he achieved greater fame in the short period of time as an actor in mountain films alongside Leni Riefenstahl.

== Life ==
Petersen was born in Freiburg im Breisgau. He was the nephew of director Arnold Fanck and took part in several of his movies in his youth alongside Leni Riefenstahl's and Ernst Udet's. Petersen also became connected to his colleague in the architectural field, Luis Trenker, through Fanck's film activity.

Petersen first studied natural sciences and then architecture in Munich, Berlin, Freiburg and Stuttgart. He completed his studies of natural sciences in 1931 with a doctorate in philosophy, and studied architecture with Clemens Holzmeister, as whose assistant he worked in Ankara on the construction of the new Turkish capital. In 1933 he worked for a short time in a consortium with Wilhelm Kreis and Alfred Fischer on designs for a Thingstätte on the Elisenhöhe in the Middle Rhine From the mid-1930s he worked together with Walter Köngeter. The architectural community was resumed after the Second World War.

Petersen had been married to Hugo Henkel's daughter Elisabeth since 1935. Petersen subsequently received many commissions from the Henkel chemical company, for which he continued to realize several settlement projects after the Second World War. Petersen was already a busy architect in the 1930s; in addition to industrial buildings, he constructed hospitals and office buildings, but also residential buildings such as the Villa Riefenstahl in Berlin-Schmargendorf in 1935 and 1936 for the then celebrated film director. As early as 1936/1937 he was able to build his own large house in Berlin-Dahlem, with adjoining workrooms and a sculpture studio for his wife.

From 1941 until his death in 1959 in Ihringen, he had a seat on the advisory board at Henkel, and during the same period - with an interruption from 1947 to 1953 – he was also on the supervisory board; he was deputy chairman on both boards.

The art collector Anette Brandhorst is a daughter from Petersen's marriage to Elisabeth Henkel.

== Architectural works (selection) ==
- 1936: Villa Riefenstahl in Berlin-Schmargendorf
- 1937: Haus Petersen in Berlin-Dahlem, residential and studio house for the architect himself
- 1937: Show house at the Reich Exhibition Schaffendes Volk in Düsseldorf (with Walter Köngeter)
- 1949: Company apartments for Henkel in Düsseldorf-Reisholz
- 1953: Henkel Estate I in Düsseldorf-Holthausen (with Walter Köngeter)
- 1955: Grammar school Am Bonneshof in Düsseldorf-Golzheim (with Walter Köngeter)
- 1955: Humboldt grammar school in Düsseldorf (with Walter Köngeter)
- 1955: Protestant Klarenbach Church in Düsseldorf (with Walter Köngeter)
- 1956: Persil School in Munich (with Walter Köngeter)
- 1958: Protestant Klarenbach Chapel (today Thomas Church) in Düsseldorf-Reisholz (with Walter Köngeter)
- 1958: Henkel Estate II in Düsseldorf-Holthausen, at Elbroichpark (with Walter Köngeter)

== Filmography ==
- 1926: The Holy Mountain
- 1928: Struggle for the Matterhorn
- 1929: The White Hell of Pitz Palu
- 1930: Storm over Mont Blanc

== Awards ==
- 1937: Grand State Prize of the Prussian Academy of Arts for architects.

== Literature ==
- Stefanie Schäfers: Vom Werkbund zum Vierjahresplan. Die Ausstellung Schaffendes Volk Düsseldorf 1937. Droste, Düsseldorf 2001, ISBN 3-7700-3045-1.
- Frank Schmitz: Landhäuser in Berlin 1933–1945. Gebrüder Mann, Berlin 2007, ISBN 978-3-7861-2543-3.
