= Richard Angst =

Swiss cinematographer (1905-1984)

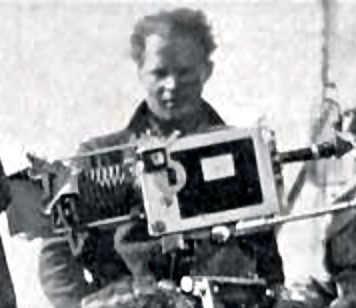
- Angst richard
- Born: 23 July 1905; Zurich, Switzerland
- Died: 24 July 1984 (aged 79); West Berlin, West Germany
- Occupation: Cinematographer
- Years active: 1927–1969

Richard Angst (23 July 1905 – 24 July 1984) was a Swiss cinematographer. He became known in the late 1920s and early 1930s for his work on mountain films with Arnold Fanck and later worked on a wide range of productions in Germany, including collaborations with Fritz Lang. Over his career he was credited on numerous feature films and was recognised in 1971 with the German Film Award for his life’s work.

== Biography ==
Richard Angst was born in Zürich, Switzerland, the son of Robert, an architect, and Elise Anna Klara Vaihinger, who came from Pforzheim, Germany, where he was raised.

In 1923 he entered film through cameraman Sepp Allgeier and became assistant to Arnold Fanck on his ski and mountain films. He trained with Fanck’s Berg- und Sportfilm GmbH in Freiburg, where he learned camera technique and film laboratory work.

In the late 1920s and early 1930s he worked as one of Fanck’s chief cinematographers on mountain film classics including The Great Leap (1927), The White Hell of Pitz Palu (1929), Storm over Mont Blanc (1930), and The White Ecstasy (1931). He gained recognition as an independent cinematographer, particularly for his work on expeditions in Asia from 1933 onward.

He also collaborated on the German-Japanese co-production The Daughter of the Samurai (1936). After returning to Berlin in 1939, Angst worked on films including Eine kleine Nachtmusik (1939), Rembrandt (1942), and Der grosse Schatten (1942). During this period he also worked on the anti-British drama My Life for Ireland (1941), described as his only explicit Nazi propaganda film.

After the Second World War he settled in Ticino, Switzerland, before returning to Berlin in the late 1950s, where he continued his film career. He was cinematographer for Fritz Lang’s The Tiger of Eschnapur and The Indian Tomb (both 1959). He later withdrew from the film industry in the 1960s, lamenting its decline, and in 1971 opened the restaurant “Provinz” in Berlin-Moabit. That same year he received the German Film Award for his life’s work.

Angst died in West Berlin on 24 July 1984. His manuscripts, including unpublished memoirs, are held by the Deutsche Kinemathek.

== Selected filmography ==
- The Great Leap (1927)
- Milak, the Greenland Hunter (1928)
- The White Hell of Pitz Palu (1929)
- Storm over Mont Blanc (1930)
- Two People (1930)
- The White Ecstasy (1931)
- Adventures in the Engadin (1932)
- S.O.S. Iceberg (1933)
- The Burning Secret (1933)
- White Majesty (1934)
- Forbidden Territory (1934)
- North Pole, Ahoy (1934)
- The Champion of Pontresina (1934)
- Demon of the Himalayas (1935)
- Kleine Scheidegg (1937)
- The Vulture Wally (1940)
- My Life for Ireland (1941)
- Rembrandt (1942)
- Melody of a Great City (1943)
- Gabriele Dambrone (1943)
- A Beautiful Day (1944)
- Melusine (1944)
- Earth (1947)
- Ulli and Marei (1948)
- A Kingdom For a Horse (1949)
- The White Hell of Pitz Palu (1950)
- Fanfares of Love (1951)
- Storm Over Tibet (1952)
- Father Needs a Wife (1952)
- Cuba Cabana (1952)
- Hit Parade (1953)
- Hocuspocus (1953)
- The First Kiss (1954)
- Three Men in the Snow (1955)
- The Last Man (1955)
- I Often Think of Piroschka (1955)
- The Spessart Inn (1958)
- La Paloma (1959)
- Peter Shoots Down the Bird (1959)
- The Indian Tomb (1959)
- The Tiger of Eschnapur (1959)
- The Good Soldier Schweik (1960)
- The Strange Countess (1961)
- Ramona (1961)
- Via Mala (1961)
- Sherlock Holmes and the Deadly Necklace (1962)
- The Secret of the Black Trunk (1962)
- Axel Munthe, The Doctor of San Michele (1962)
- The Black Abbot (1963)
- Breakfast in Bed (1963)
- The Hangman of London (1963)
- The Phantom of Soho (1964)
- The Seventh Victim (1964)
- The Dirty Game (1965)
- A Holiday with Piroschka (1965)
- Praetorius (1965)
- Liselotte of the Palatinate (1966)
- The Wedding Trip (1969)

== Bibliography ==
- High, Peter B. The Imperial Screen: Japanese Film Culture in the Fifteen Years' War, 1931-1945. University of Wisconsin Press, 2003.
- Reimer, Robert C. & Reimer, Carol J. The A to Z of German Cinema. Rowman & Littlefield, 2010.
