= The White Hell of Pitz Palu =

The White Hell of Pitz Palu may refer to:

- The White Hell of Pitz Palu (1929 film), a German silent mountain film
- The White Hell of Pitz Palu (1950 film), a West German mountain film
