= The White Stadium =

1928 film

- German film poster
- German: Das weiße Stadion
- Directed by: Arnold Fanck
- Cinematography: Sepp Allgeier; Hans Schneeberger
- Edited by: Walter Ruttmann
- Production company: Olympia-Film
- Distributed by: UFA
- Release date: 19 March 1928
- Country: Switzerland
- Languages: Silent; German intertitles

The White Stadium (German: Das weiße Stadion) is a 1928 Swiss documentary film directed by Arnold Fanck about the 1928 Winter Olympics which were held in the Swiss resort of St. Moritz. The film received the backing of the International Olympic Committee and was the first of the Winter Olympic feature films to be made. It was financed and distributed by the major German studio UFA, but was not a commercial or critical success.

Fanck's protégé Leni Riefenstahl later directed the much more successful Olympia portraying the 1936 Berlin Olympics.
