= S.O.S. Eisberg =

1933 German-US drama film

- German theatrical release poster
- Directed by: Arnold Fanck; Tay Garnett (U.S. version)
- Written by: Edwin H. Knopf
- Screenplay by: Tom Reed
- Story by: Arnold Fanck; Friedrich Wolf (uncredited)
- Produced by: Carl Laemmle Jr.; Paul Kohner
- Starring: Gustav Diessl; Leni Riefenstahl; Sepp Rist; Gibson Gowland; Ernst Udet; Rod La Rocque; Walter Riml
- Cinematography: Richard Angst; Hans Schneeberger
- Edited by: Hermann Haller; Andrew Marton
- Music by: Paul Dessau
- Production company: Deutsche Universal-Film
- Distributed by: Deutsche Universal-Film; Universal Pictures
- Release dates: 30 August 1933 (Germany); 22 September 1933 (USA)
- Running time: 90 minutes
- Countries: Germany, US
- Languages: German, English

S.O.S. Eisberg (released in English as S.O.S. Iceberg and Iceland) is a 1933 German-US pre-Code drama film directed by Arnold Fanck and starring Gustav Diessl, Leni Riefenstahl, Sepp Rist, Gibson Gowland, Rod La Rocque, and Ernst Udet. The film was written by Tom Reed based on a story by Arnold Fanck and Friedrich Wolf. (Note: Wolf's involvement in S.O.S. Eisberg was uncredited because he was Jewish and a member of the Communist Party of Germany, a fate that befell others, after the seizure of power by the Nazis in 1933.) S.O.S. Eisberg follows the account of the real-life Alfred Lothar Wegener polar expedition of 1929–30.

Among the stars in S.O.S. Eisberg were Leni Riefenstahl, who had just made her directorial debut in The Blue Light (1932). Riefenstahl, in her last film as an actress, co-starred with Gustav Diessl and Ernst Udet in the German version S.O.S. Eisberg, and with Gibson Gowland and Rod La Rocque in the English version, S.O.S. Iceberg. Ernst Udet, a former German ace in the First World War, in a cameo performance, flew in both versions. (Note: Ernst Udet scored 62 aerial victories, the second-highest German ace in the First World War, then became a "stunt pilot, explorer and hunter" after the war.)

== Plot ==
At a banquet held by the International Society for Arctic Research, the members toast scientist Dr. Carl Lorenz, about to recreate famed explorer Wegener's ill-fated expedition. Lorenz's team consists of two scientists, Dr. Johannes Brand and Dr. Jan Matushek, his friend, Fritz Kuemmel, their financial backer, John Dragan, and their pilot to the Arctic, Lorenz's wife Hella.

After Hella drops them at their base camp, the men begin their long trek to recover Wegener's records and prove his theories on ice floes. As the weeks pass, Brand and the others fear they will not survive when the ice breaks up, but Lorenz scoffs and refuses to wait until winter.

Early one morning, Lorenz sets out on his own. His companions fear he is lost. They find a hut Wegener occupied and a note from Lorenz saying that he is trying to reach a native village. Suddenly the ice breaks up and the sleds carrying their food supplies tumble into a ravine. The rescuers take refuge on a huge iceberg where they discover a dazed and uncommunicative Lorenz.

Brand begins sending out an S.O.S. on his wireless and Hella immediately leaves to search for her husband. Disaster strikes, with Dragan going mad, and as Kümmel fights with him to prevent their dog, Nakinak, from being killed, Kümmel falls to his death.

When Hella finds the survivors, she misjudges her landing and crashes but is able to swim to the iceberg. Seeing they are drifting out to sea, Brand dives into the water and is picked up by another pilot, famed aviator Ernst Udet, who has been tracking Hella's flight path. Udet flies Brand to the nearby Inuit village.

Matushek sees two polar bears fighting over a seal but is killed when he tries to spear the bears. Dragan then attacks Hella, but by then her husband has come to his senses, and she is saved. The iceberg begins to come apart, flinging Dragan into the sea.

Lorenz, Hella and Nakinak are rescued by the Inuit. The three survivors later are aboard a ship bound for home, but Lorenz is haunted by the deaths incurred in his misguided expedition.

== Cast ==
German version

- Gustav Diessl as Dr. Karl Lorenz
- Leni Riefenstahl as Hella Lorenz
- Sepp Rist as Dr. Johannes Krafft
- Ernst Udet as Ernst Udet
- Gibson Gowland as John Dragan
- Max Holzboer as Dr. Jan Matuschek
- Walter Riml as Fritz Kümmel

English version

- Rod La Rocque as Dr. Carl Lawrence
- Leni Riefenstahl as Ellen Lawrence
- Sepp Rist as Dr. Johannes Brand
- Ernst Udet as Ernst Udet, flier
- Gibson Gowland as John Dragan
- Max Holzboer as Dr. Jan Matuschek
- Walter Riml as Fritz Kümmel
- Nakinak as Nakinak, the Inuit dog

== Production ==
The film was based on Alfred Wegener's Greenland expedition. The Danish government, which banned film production in Greenland, allowed the production to film in Greenland under the protection of Knud Rasmussen. Fritz Loewe and Ernst Sorge, two members of the ill-fated expedition, served as technical consultants.

Arnold Fanck wanted Elly Beinhorn to play Ellen, but Universal selected Leni Riefenstahl to capitalize off of the success of The White Hell of Pitz Palu. This was the first American film that Riefenstahl starred in.

Production started under the working title of Iceland. Prior to principal photography, pre-production development and location shooting took a year. Fanck became engaged to Elizabeth Kind on 2 May 1932, and brought her with him as a script supervisor. Fanch, Kind, Paul Kohner, Zoltan Kegl, Werner Klingler, and Gibson Gowland left Copenhagen for Greenland on 20 May, and arrived at Uummannaq three weeks later. $350,000 was spent shooting 350,000 feet of film, around 60 hours. The interiors shot were filmed in a Berlin studio.

A total of 38 men and women, three polar bears and two sea lions of the Hagenbeck circus making up the crew of the S.O.S. Eisberg boarded the Borodino at the end of June 1932. Filming was especially arduous with "Leni Riefenstahl, whose life he (Fanck) had often put in danger", after her repeated swimming in frigid waters, having to leave the production, "before the others, to be hospitalized in Copenhagen".

None of the film's actors had doubles and actors endured extreme cold and performed dangerous stunts. Udet almost died when his plane's engine lost power and crashed at the base of an iceberg. Udet was rescued by the Inuit, but minutes later, the iceberg which was supporting some of the crew crumbled to bits, casting men and equipment into the water below. The production unit ship anchored nearby was so shaken by the event that it nearly capsized, throwing people on board the deck into the water. All were rescued, but considerable sound equipment was destroyed." One member of the crew was lost for six days before being found, five people were burned, and two airplanes crashed.

Although "conceived and started by Germans", S.O.S. Eisberg was "turned over to Universal when the originators were unable to carry it through." Tay Garnett was sent to Germany by Carl Laemmle to salvage the film. Garnett decided to make the film seven reels long, but needed a story and only found 30 minutes of the footage to be usable. Edwin H. Knopf was hired to write a script around the footage that was shot. Garnett and Fanck filmed additional scenes in Switzerland, which were silent so that Udet and Riefenstahl could dub over in English. The score for the film was composed by Paul Dessau and performed by the Berlin Symphony Orchestra.

The highlights of the action included air crashes; the aircraft in S.O.S. Eisberg were:

- de Havilland 60 Genet Moth c/n 271, D-1651
- BFW M.23bW c/n 511, D-1970
- Klemm VL 26b c/n 278, D-2269
- Udet U 12b Spezial Flamingo D-822
- Junkers A 20 c/n 862, D-574

Aviation film historian James H. Farmer in Celluloid Wings: The Impact of Movies on Aviation (1984) noted, "... some outstanding, though brief aerial sequences are featured."

== Release ==
The preview version of the film was 121 minutes long. S.O.S. Eisberg, the German version of the film with a runtime of 103 minutes, premiered in Berlin on 8 August 1933. S.O.S. Iceberg, the English version of the film with a runtime of 70 minutes, premiered in Berlin in September. A shorter version of S.O.S. Iceberg was released by Castle Films in 1951.

== Reception ==
Variety in their contemporary review of S.O.S. Iceberg noted, "The result is an authentic and authoritative series of polar pictures which scarcely need the pressbook assurance that no miniatures were used to supplement the straight shots." The New York Daily News gave the film three and a half stars.

== See also ==
- List of German films 1933–1945

== Works cited ==
- Waldman, Harry (2008). Nazi Films In America, 1933-1942. McFarland & Company. ISBN 9780786438617.
- "Universal's Epic Drama of Love and Sacrifice: "S.O.S. Iceberg"". Universal Weekly. Vol. 33, no. 6. Universal Studios. 21 October 1933.

=== Bibliography ===
- Fanck, Arnold. S.O.S. Eisberg. Mit Dr. Fanck u. Ernst Udet in Groenland. Die Groenland-Expedition des Universal-Films S.O.S. Eisberg. München: F. BruckmannAG, 1933. OCLC 219890420.
- Farmer, James H. Celluloid Wings: The Impact of Movies on Aviation. Blue Ridge Summit, Pennsylvania: Tab Books Inc., 1984. ISBN 978-0-83062-374-7.
- Paris, Michael. From the Wright Brothers to Top Gun: Aviation, Nationalism, and Popular Cinema. Manchester, UK: Manchester University Press, 1995. ISBN 978-0-7190-4074-0.
- Pendo, Stephen. Aviation in the Cinema. Lanham, Maryland: Scarecrow Press, 1985. ISBN 978-0-81081-746-3.
- Riefenstahl, Leni. Leni Riefenstahl: A Memoir. New York: Picador, 1995. ISBN 978-0-31211-926-3.
- Riefenstahl, Leni. Kampf in Schee und Eis. Leipzig: Hesse und Bacher Verlag, 1933.
- Sorge, Ernst. With Plane, Boat, and Camera in Greenland: An Account of the Universal Dr. Fanck Greenland expedition. London: Hurst & Blackett, Ltd., 1935.
