= Mountain of Destiny =

1924 film

- German film poster
- German: Berg des Schicksals
- Directed by: Arnold Fanck
- Written by: Arnold Fanck
- Produced by: Arnold Fanck
- Starring: Hannes Schneider; Frida Richard; Erna Morena; Luis Trenker
- Cinematography: Arnold Fanck; Sepp Allgeier; Eugen Hamm; Herbert Oettel; Hans Schneeberger
- Edited by: Arnold Fanck
- Music by: Florian C. Reithner (2010)
- Production companies: Berg- und Sportfilm; Alpenfilm AG, Villars-sur-Glâne
- Release date: 10 May 1924 (Germany)
- Running time: 87 minutes
- Country: Germany
- Languages: Silent film German intertitles

Mountain of Destiny (German: Berg des Schicksals) is a 1924 German silent drama film written and directed by Arnold Fanck and starring Hannes Schneider, Frida Richard, Erna Morena, and Luis Trenker. The film is about an alpinist who falls to his death while climbing a dangerous peak. His son later succeeds where his father had failed. The film was released in the United Kingdom with the title The Mountaineers. After seeing Mountain of Destiny, Leni Riefenstahl, then a dancer, decided she wanted to start appearing in films. She got in touch with Fanck and starred in his 1926 film The Holy Mountain.

== Plot ==
After a mountaineer is killed attempting to climb a difficult mountain, his son dreams of conquering the peak that has defeated his father. But his mother makes him promise never to attempt it. Events eventually force her to release him from the promise, and he ascends the mountain successfully.

== Cast ==
- Hannes Schneider as Bergsteiger
- Frida Richard as Bergsteiger's mother
- Erna Morena as Bergsteiger's wife
- Luis Trenker as Bergsteiger's son
- Gustav Oberg as Freund des Bergsteigers
- Hertha von Walther as Hella, Bergsteiger's daughter
- Werner Schaarschmidt as unknown climber
- H. von Hoeslin as unknown climber
