= The Eternal Dream =

1934 film

- Directed by: Arnold Fanck
- Written by: Arnold Fanck; Karl Ziak (novel
- Produced by: Arnold Pressburger; Gregor Rabinovitch
- Starring: Sepp Rist; Brigitte Horney; Ernst Nansen
- Cinematography: Richard Angst; Kurt Neubert
- Edited by: Alice Ludwig
- Music by: Giuseppe Becce
- Production company: Cine-Allianz Tonfilmproduktions
- Distributed by: UFA
- Release date: 20 November 1934
- Running time: 96 minutes
- Country: Germany
- Language: German

The Eternal Dream (German: Der ewige Traum) is a 1934 German historical film directed by Arnold Fanck and starring Sepp Rist and Brigitte Horney. The film's sets were designed by the art directors Robert Herlth and Werner Schlichting.

== Cast ==
- Sepp Rist as Jacques Balmat
- Brigitte Horney as Maria
- Ernst Nansen as Paccard
- Eduard von Winterstein as Marias Vater
- Helene Fehdmer as Marias Mutter
- Friedrich Kayßler as Pfarrer
- Klaus Pohl as Balmats Vater
- Willy Kaiser-Heyl as Saussure
- Hans Hermann Schaufuß as Ein Bauer
- Walter Riml as Der Maler
- Ernst Dumcke as Der Dichter
- Pierre Provins as Der Heerführer

== Bibliography ==
- Hinton, David B. (2000). The films of Leni Riefenstahl. Rowman & Littlefield. ISBN 978-1-57886-009-8.
