= The White Hell of Pitz Palu (1950 film) =

1950 film

- Poster bearing the East German title Sturm in der Ostwand
- Directed by: Rolf Hansen
- Written by: Arnold Fanck (novella); Erna Fentsch
- Produced by: Rolf Hansen; Friedrich A. Mainz; Harry R. Sokal; Walter Traut; Chiel Weissmann
- Starring: Hans Albers; Liselotte Pulver; Adrian Hoven; Antje Weisgerber
- Cinematography: Richard Angst
- Edited by: Anna Höllering
- Music by: Mark Lothar
- Production companies: Rolf Hansen Film; Sokal-Film
- Distributed by: Deutsche London Film
- Release date: 10 October 1950
- Running time: 107 minutes
- Country: West Germany
- Language: German

The White Hell of Pitz Palu (German: Föhn), also known as Sturm in der Ostwand in East Germany, is a 1950 West German mountain film directed by Rolf Hansen and starring Hans Albers, Liselotte Pulver and Adrian Hoven. It is a remake of Arnold Fanck's 1929 film The White Hell of Pitz Palu. Interiors were shot at the Bavaria Studios in Munich. The film's sets were designed by the art directors Hans Sohnle and Fritz Lück. It was a prominent early role for Lieselotte Pulver and helped put the young Swiss actress on the path to stardom in the German-speaking world.

== Plot ==
A young American couple accompany a veteran mountaineer on a dangerous climb in the Swiss Alps.

== Cast ==
- Hans Albers as Dr. Johannes Jensen
- Liselotte Pulver as Maria
- Adrian Hoven as Peter Hofkirchner
- Antje Weisgerber as Frau Dr.Jensen
- Heinrich Gretler as Der Glucker
- Lucius Versell as Christian Gluckers Sohn
- Ellen Widmann as Hebamme

== Bibliography ==
- Reimer, Robert C.; Reimer, Carol J. (2010). The A to Z of German Cinema. Lanham, MD: Scarecrow Press. ISBN 978-0-8108-7611-8.
