= Sepp Allgeier =

German cinematographer

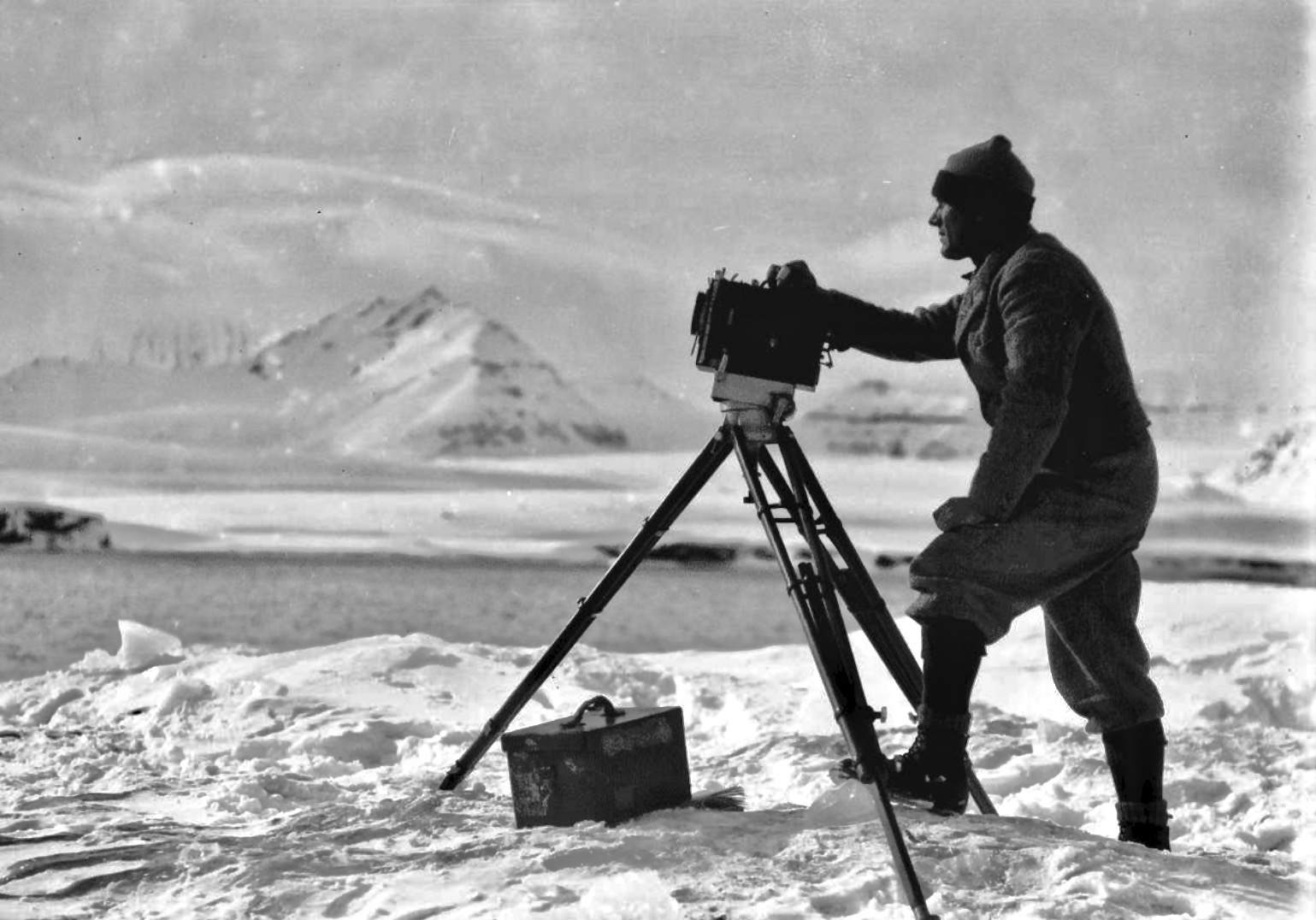
- Allgeier during an UFA expedition to Spitzbergen and Greenland. The shooting resulted in the silent movie Milak, der Grönlandjäger
- Born: 6 February 1895; Freiburg im Breisgau, Duchy of Baden, German Empire
- Died: 11 March 1968 (aged 73); Freiburg im Breisgau, Baden-Württemberg, West Germany
- Occupation: Cinematographer
- Years active: 1911–1951

Josef "Sepp" Allgeier (6 February 1895 – 11 March 1968) was a German cinematographer who worked on around fifty features, documentaries and short films. He began his career as a cameraman in 1911 for the Expreß Film Co. of Freiburg im Breisgau. In 1913, he filmed newsreels in the Balkans. He then became an assistant to Arnold Fanck, a leading director of Mountain films. He worked frequently with Luis Trenker and Leni Riefenstahl, both closely associated with the genre. He was Riefenstahl's lead cameraman on her 1935 propaganda film Triumph of the Will. During the Second World War, Allgeier filmed material for newsreels. He later worked in West German television. His son is the cinematographer Hans-Jörg Allgeier.

== Selected filmography ==
- Mountain of Destiny (1924)
- The Holy Mountain (1926)
- The Great Leap (1927)
- Alpine Tragedy (1927)
- Milak, the Greenland Hunter (1928)
- Struggle for the Matterhorn (1928)
- Diary of a Lost Girl (1929)
- The White Hell of Pitz Palu (1929)
- Storm Over Mont Blanc (1930)
- Mountains on Fire (1931)
- The Rebel (1932)
- Baroud (1932)
- William Tell (1934)
- The Champion of Pontresina (1934)
- Frisians in Peril (1935)
- Escape Me Never (1935)
- Ewiger Wald (1936)
- Militiaman Bruggler (1936)
- The Great Barrier (1937)
- The Mountain Calls (1938)
- A German Robinson Crusoe (1940)
- The Sinful Village (1940)
- Lightning Around Barbara (1941)
- Border Post 58 (1951)

== Bibliography ==
- Allgeier, Sepp (1931) Die Jagd nach dem Bild; 18 Jahre als Kameramann in Arktis und Hochgebirge Stuttgart: J. Engelhorns nachf. OCLC 9001961
- von Savigny, Brigitte; Allgeier, Sepp (1999) Sepp Allgeier Fotografien eines Kamerapioniers Furtwangen DesignConcepts-Verl. ISBN 9783980705905
- Sepp Allgeier Archetype of a Camera Man (1999) film by Sigrid Faltin
- Klien, Arno (2004) “Sepp Allgeier and the First High Mountain Movie” in 3rd FIS Ski History Conference at Winter! Sport! Museum! Mürzzuschlag, Austria pg 11
- Von Moltke, Johannes (2005) No Place Like Home: Locations of Heimat in German Cinema University of California Press ISBN 9780520244115 pg 45
- Masia, Seth (September 2006) "Moving Pictures" Skiing Heritage Journal Vol 18 #3:37
- Allen, E. John B. (2007) The Culture and Sport of Skiing: From Antiquity to World War II Amherst: University of Massachusetts Press ISBN 978-1558496002 pg 262
- Reimer, Robert Charles & Reimer, Carol J. (2010) The A to Z of German Cinema Rowman & Littlefield
