= The Great Leap (film) =

1927 film

- German theatrical release poster
- Directed by: Arnold Fanck
- Written by: Arnold Fanck
- Produced by: Arnold Fanck
- Starring: Leni Riefenstahl; Luis Trenker; Hans Schneeberger; Paul Graetz
- Cinematography: Sepp Allgeier; Richard Angst; Albert Benitz; Charles Métain; Kurt Neubert; Hans Schneeberger
- Edited by: Arnold Fanck
- Music by: Werner R. Heymann
- Production company: UFA
- Distributed by: UFA
- Release date: 20 December 1927 (Germany)
- Running time: 112 minutes
- Country: Germany
- Languages: Silent film, German intertitles

The Great Leap (German: Der grosse Sprung) is a 1927 German silent comedy film directed by Arnold Fanck and starring Leni Riefenstahl, Luis Trenker and Hans Schneeberger. A young Italian girl living in the Dolomites falls in love with a member of a tourist party skiing on the nearby mountains.

== Cast ==
- Leni Riefenstahl as Gita
- Luis Trenker as Toni
- Hans Schneeberger as Michael Treuherz
- Paul Graetz as Paule
