= A German Robinson Crusoe =

1940 film

- German film poster
- German: Ein Robinson
- Directed by: Arnold Fanck
- Written by: Arnold Fanck; Rolf Meyer
- Produced by: Oskar Marion; Wilhelm Sperber; Carl Wilhelm Tetting
- Starring: Herbert A.E. Böhme; Marieluise Claudius; Claus Clausen
- Cinematography: Sepp Allgeier; Albert Benitz; Hans Ert
- Edited by: Arnold Fanck; Johannes Lüdke
- Music by: Werner Bochmann
- Production company: Bavaria Film
- Distributed by: Bavaria Film
- Release date: 25 April 1940
- Running time: 81 minutes
- Country: Germany
- Language: German

A German Robinson Crusoe (German: Ein Robinson) is a 1940 German drama film directed by Arnold Fanck and starring Herbert A.E. Böhme, Marieluise Claudius, and Claus Clausen. Written by Arnold Fanck and Rolf Meyer, the film is a modern-day Robinson Crusoe story about a man so angry about the post-World War I conditions in Weimar Germany that he voluntarily goes to live on a desert island. The film was shot partly on location in South America.

== Plot ==
During World War I, the German cruiser SMS Dresden is attacked by British ships off the coast of Chile. The crew manage to abandon ship before it sinks. They make their way to an isolated island where they are taken prisoner. After spending three years in custody, the sailors manage to escape and make their way back to Germany, intending to continue fighting for their Fatherland. When they arrive, however, they encounter a different Germany from the one they left behind—one where they are ridiculed and attacked by mutineers.

One of the returning crew, Carl Ohlse, leaves Weimar Germany and returns to the island where he had been held prisoner for three years, determined to live out the rest of his life as a Robinson Crusoe. Some time later, he hears a radio report that describes how things have improved in Germany during the 1930s. Later, when the new SMS Dresden passes the island, he makes his way to the ship and is taken aboard by his new respectful comrades.

== Cast ==
- Herbert A.E. Böhme as Carl Ohlsen
- Marieluise Claudius as Antje
- Claus Clausen as Fritz Grothe
- Oskar Marion as captain
- Malte Jäger as officer
- Wilhelm P. Krüger as Pagels
- Otto Kronburger as commander
- Wolf Dietrich as officer
- Ludwig Schmid-Wildy as sailor
- Leopold Kerscher as sailor
- Martin Rickelt as sailor Peter
- Georg Völkel as 1. officer
- Hans Kühlewein as Obermaat
- Charly Berger as staff surgeon
- Günther Polensen as sailor
- Hans-Joachim Fanck as little Peter

== Production ==
A German Robinson Crusoe was directed by Arnold Fanck. It was shot at the Bavaria Studios in Munich and the Babelsberg Studios in Potsdam. The location shooting took place around Patagonia and Tierra del Fuego in Chile. The film's sets were designed by the art directors Hans Sohnle and Kurt Dürnhöfer.

== Release ==
It was banned from being shown in Germany by the Allied High Commission after World War II.

== Works cited ==
- Kelson, John (1996). Catalogue of Forbidden German Feature and Short Film Productions held in Zonal Film Archives of Film Section, Information Services Division, Control Commission for Germany, (BE) (2 ed.). Greenwood Publishing Group. ISBN 0948911190.
