= Odo Deodatus Tauern =

German ethnologist, physicist and inventor

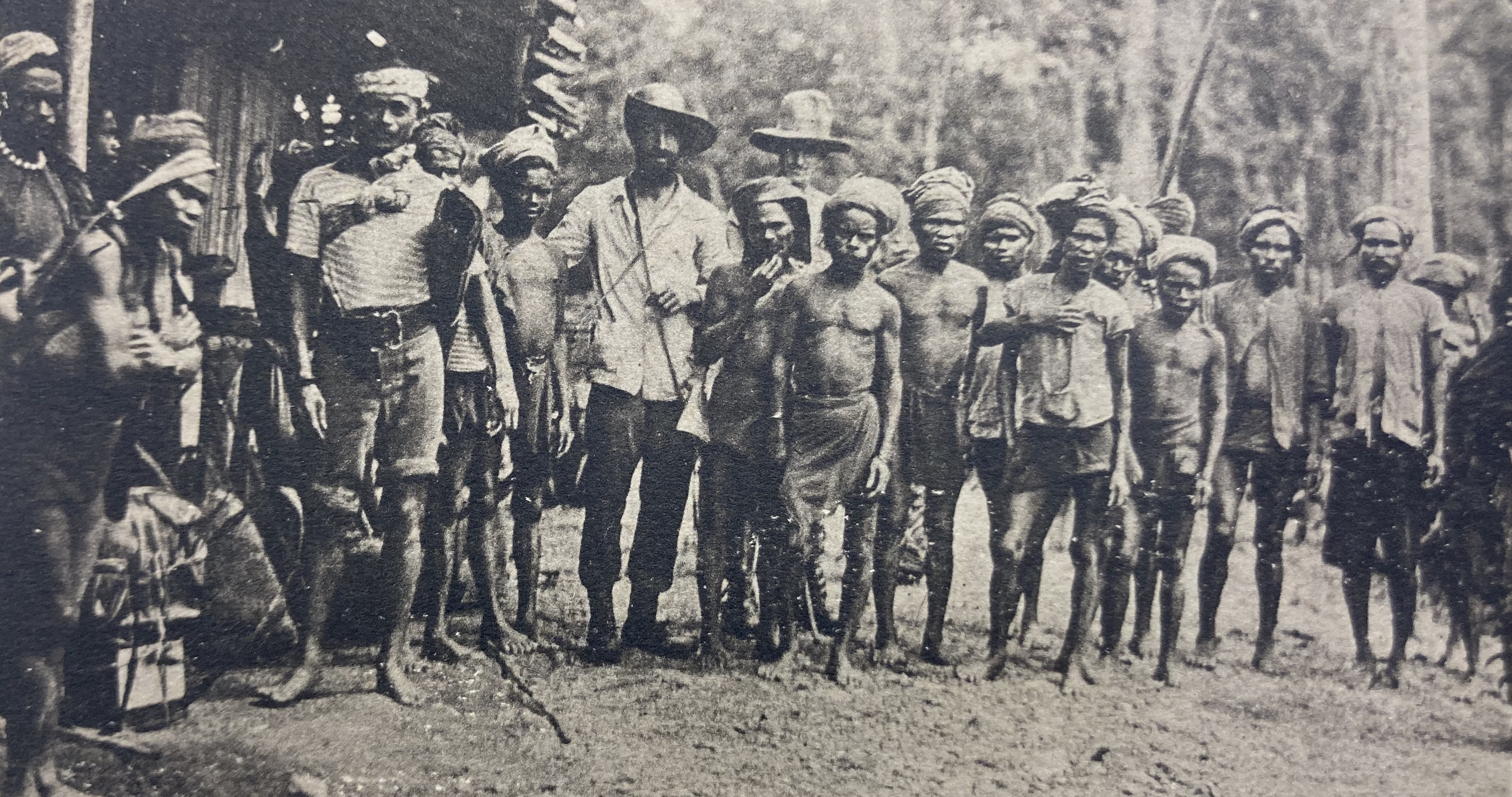
Group of Ailfuru people from Manusela and Selimena with Odo Tauern and a Dutch officer Lt. I. Smeenck, c. 1918

Odo Deodatus I. Tauern (November 14, 1885 – July 11, 1926) was a German ethnologist, physicist, and inventor from a family of nobility who travelled to Southeast Asia as part of an expedition. He made the oldest known recordings of Balinese music on Edison wax cylinders. He collected for the ethnographic museum in Freiburg. He also made innovations in film and cinematography.

== Life and work ==
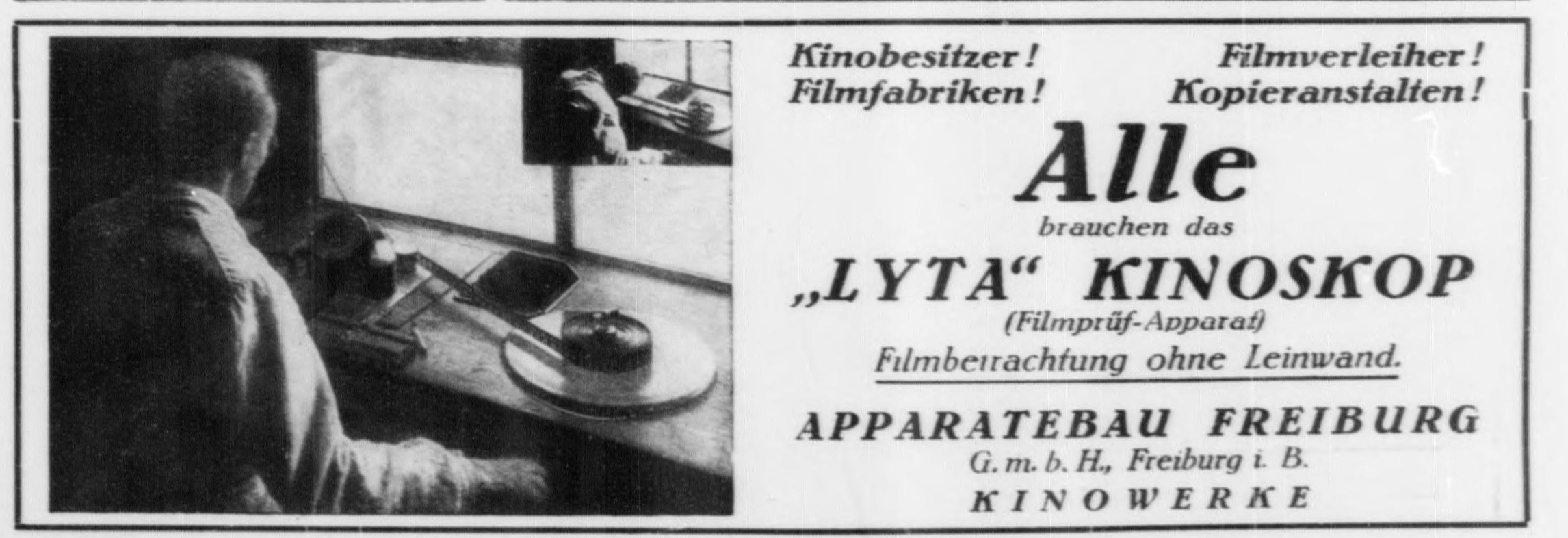
Advertisement for the "Lyta" editing system

Tauern was a son of Guido Henckel von Donnersmarck. He was born illegitimate in New York but was fostered by Countess Luise von Voss in Berlin. He went to Michaelis Gymnasium and became interested in the natural sciences and went on to study at the Friedrich-Wilhelms-Universität, Berlin and the Albert-Ludwigs-Universität Freiburg, Breisgau receiving a doctorate in science in 1909 for studies on the Kerr effect (Tauern suggested that double refraction in glass induced by electromagnetic fields could be used to measure high voltages). He was chosen heir by his father Guido Graf Henckel Fürst von Donnersmarck. In 1910 he took part in an expedition to the Moluccas organized by Karl Deninger who led the team which included the zoologist Erwin Stresemann. He took an interest in ethnology on the expedition while also supporting it technically. He documented the Sakai language of Padang. Tauern married Marie Sophie Berthold, the daughter of a family friend in Berlin, in 1914. The family lived in Freiburg, Breisgau and also spent summers in a cottage in Feldberg, the Black Forest, and raised three children. He was keenly into mountain climbing in the summers and spent winters on skiing trips. He chaired the Academic Ski Club in Freiburg from 1913 to 1920 and founded Berg- und Sport-Film GmbH in Freiburg along with Arnold Fanck, Bernhard Villinger and Rolf Bauer. Their film [The Miracle of the Snowshoe] was among the first to make use of slow-motion. He also patented various innovations in film making including a viewing and editing setup collaborating with Nikolau Lyon who produced the Lyta Kinoskop (Ly for Lyon and ta for Tauern). He died on a climbing accident at Paulkefelsen in the Black Forest.
