= Milak, the Greenland Hunter =

1928 film

- Directed by: Georg Asagaroff; Bernhard Villinger
- Written by: Arnold Fanck; Armin Petersen; Bernhard Villinger
- Starring: Ruth Weyher; Nils Focksen; Lotte Lorring
- Cinematography: Sepp Allgeier; Richard Angst; Albert Benitz
- Production company: UFA
- Distributed by: UFA
- Release date: 6 June 1928
- Country: Germany
- Languages: Silent; German intertitles

Milak, the Greenland Hunter (German: Milak, der Grönlandjäger) is a 1928 German silent adventure film directed by Georg Asagaroff and Bernhard Villinger and starring Ruth Weyher, Nils Focksen and Lotte Lorring.

Made by UFA, it was shot on location in Greenland.

== Cast ==
- Ruth Weyher as Movie part
- Nils Focksen as Movie part
- Lotte Lorring as Movie part
- Iris Arlan as Movie part
- Helmer Hannsen as Movie part
- Robby Robert as Movie part
- Sepp Allgeier as Expeditionsteilnehmer - Himself
- Richard Angst as Expeditionsteilnehmer - Himself
- Harry Bellinghausen as Expeditionsteilnehmer - Himself
- Albert Benitz as Expeditionsteilnehmer - Himself
- Waldemar Coste as Expeditionsteilnehmer - Himself
- Bernhard Villinger as Expeditionsleiter - Himself

== Bibliography ==
- Bock, Hans-Michael & Bergfelder, Tim. The Concise Cinegraph: Encyclopaedia of German Cinema. Berghahn Books, 2009.
- Thomas, Douglas B. The early history of German motion pictures, 1895-1935. Thomas International, 1999.
