= The White Hell of Pitz Palu (1929 film) =

1929 film

- German theatrical release poster
- Directed by: Arnold Fanck; G. W. Pabst
- Written by: Arnold Fanck; Ladislaus Vajda
- Produced by: Harry R. Sokal
- Starring: Leni Riefenstahl; Gustav Diessl; Ernst Petersen; Ernst Udet
- Cinematography: Sepp Allgeier; Richard Angst; Hans Schneeberger
- Edited by: Arnold Fanck; Hermann Haller
- Music by: Willy Schmidt-Gentner
- Production company: H. R. Sokal-Film GmbH
- Distributed by: Aafa-Film AG
- Release date: 15 November 1929 (Germany)
- Running time: 150 minutes
- Country: Germany
- Languages: Silent film, German intertitles

The White Hell of Pitz Palu (German: Die weiße Hölle vom Piz Palü) is a 1929 German silent mountain film co-directed by Arnold Fanck and G. W. Pabst and starring Leni Riefenstahl, Gustav Diessl, Ernst Petersen, and World War I pilot Ernst Udet. Written by Fanck and Ladislaus Vajda, the film is about a man who loses his wife in an avalanche while climbing the Piz Palü mountain, and spends the next few years searching the mountain alone for her body. Four years later he meets a young couple who agree to accompany him on his next climb. The White Hell of Pitz Palu was filmed on location in the Bernina Range in Graubünden, Switzerland. The film is regarded as one of the earliest examples of mountain films that combined adventure with human drama.

== Plot ==
The White Hell of Pitz Palu (1929)

Dr. Johannes Krafft and his bride Maria are spending their honeymoon mountain climbing in the Bernina Alps in southeast Switzerland. While climbing the north face of Piz Palü in the strong föhn winds, the loving couple's guide Christian warns Krafft not to be cocky in this dangerous environment, but the doctor dismisses the warning. Just then a violent avalanche descends on the couple, the safety rope breaks, and Maria is swept down into a deep crevice in the Piz Palü glacier. Despite his wife's initial cries for help, Krafft is unable to reach her in her icy grave. Krafft spends the next years wandering the mountain alone like a ghost, looking for the body of his lost bride.

Four years later, a young couple—Maria Maioni and her fiancé Hans Brandt—arrive at the Diavolezza-Hütte preparing to climb Piz Palü. Recently engaged and very much in love, the couple settle in to their remote mountain hut. Their friend, Udet, piloting a biplane, uses a small parachute to deliver a bottle of champagne to the couple. While paging through the Diavolezza-Hütte log, Maria notices an entry for 6 October 1925 written by Dr. Johannes Krafft. The entry notes that Maria Krafft died by accident in the Piz Palü glacier. Just then, Krafft arrives at the mountain hut on one of his solitary excursions. Maria offers the lonely man tea, and soon the three become acquainted.

The local guide, Christian, arrives and mentions that a group of students from Zürich will be arriving the next day to climb the north face. Disturbed by the news, Krafft prepares to set out once again on his own. After Christian tells Maria that Krafft tried climbing the north face twice and failed because he was alone, she asks Hans if they should let him make the climb alone. The next morning, as Krafft prepares to leave, Hans approaches and offers to accompany the doctor, who accepts. Later when Maria discovers that Hans left with Krafft for the north face, she skis after the men, catches up with them, and insists that they take her along. Despite the memory of his wife's terrible fate on the mountain, Krafft reluctantly agrees. Together they set off across the pristine snow for the Piz Palü north face.

As they ascend the icy mountain, a slightly jealous Hans (the three had innocently shared a bed the night before) insists on taking the lead. While traversing a difficult stretch, he is swept away by an avalanche. Krafft climbs down and rescues the injured Hans, moving him to a precarious ledge near an avalanche shute. Maria bandages Hans' injured scalp, and the three consider their predicament—trapped on the narrow ledge with no means of escape. Moreover, while rescuing Hans, Dr. Krafft broke one of his legs, which he then splints up. Despite Krafft's desperate calls for help, there is no one near enough to rescue them. They find a small ice cave which provides some shelter during the night for Maria and Hans, while Krafft stands outside with his lantern signaling for help, his ice pick used as a crutch.

Meanwhile, Christian returns to the hut and discovers Hans' log entry. Concerned for their safety in the coming storm, the mountain guide sets off after them, but soon is turned back by the blizzard conditions. He returns to the valley and enlists the help of his fellow villagers. Soon a rescue team snakes its way up the mountain with pitch torches and stretchers. They make their way through the night, illuminated by the magical light of the torches. The next day they reach the summit and attempt to rope down to the stranded party, but they are unsuccessful. Later that night, the three can barely survive the freezing cold and wind. Delirious with fever, Hans tries to jump to his death. When Krafft moves to prevent him, Hans attempts to kill the doctor, who is not as strong with only one working leg. Krafft is saved when Maria ties up her crazed fiancé.

The next morning, after learning of the stranded party, pilot Ernst Udet takes off in his aircraft in search of Krafft, Maria, and Hans. When he locates them, he makes several unsuccessful attempts to parachute supplies down to them. Before leaving, he manages to show Christian their exact location on the mountain. With no help in sight, however, Krafft takes off his jacket and wraps it around Hans to prevent the young man from freezing to death. Krafft then crawls away to an isolated ice ledge and waits to die.

Christian finally rappels down to them and discovers a note Krafft left for him indicating that he did his best to save the two young people. He asks his old friend to leave him where he is—that he was always "good friends with the ice". During his attempt to bring Maria and Hans back to safety, an avalanche nearly kills them. Later they arrive back at the village, where Maria and Hans are nursed back to health by having snow rubbed over their bare skin. When Maria awakens from the trauma, she learns that Krafft perished in the ice, on the same mountain that once took his wife.

== Cast ==
- Gustav Diessl as Dr. Johannes Krafft
- Leni Riefenstahl as Maria Maioni
- Ernst Petersen as Hans Brandt
- Ernst Udet as himself
- Mizzi Götzel as Maria Krafft, the wife of Dr. Johannes Krafft
- Christian Klucker as Christian, the mountain guide (Otto Spring)
- Kurt Gerron as a night club guest

== Production ==
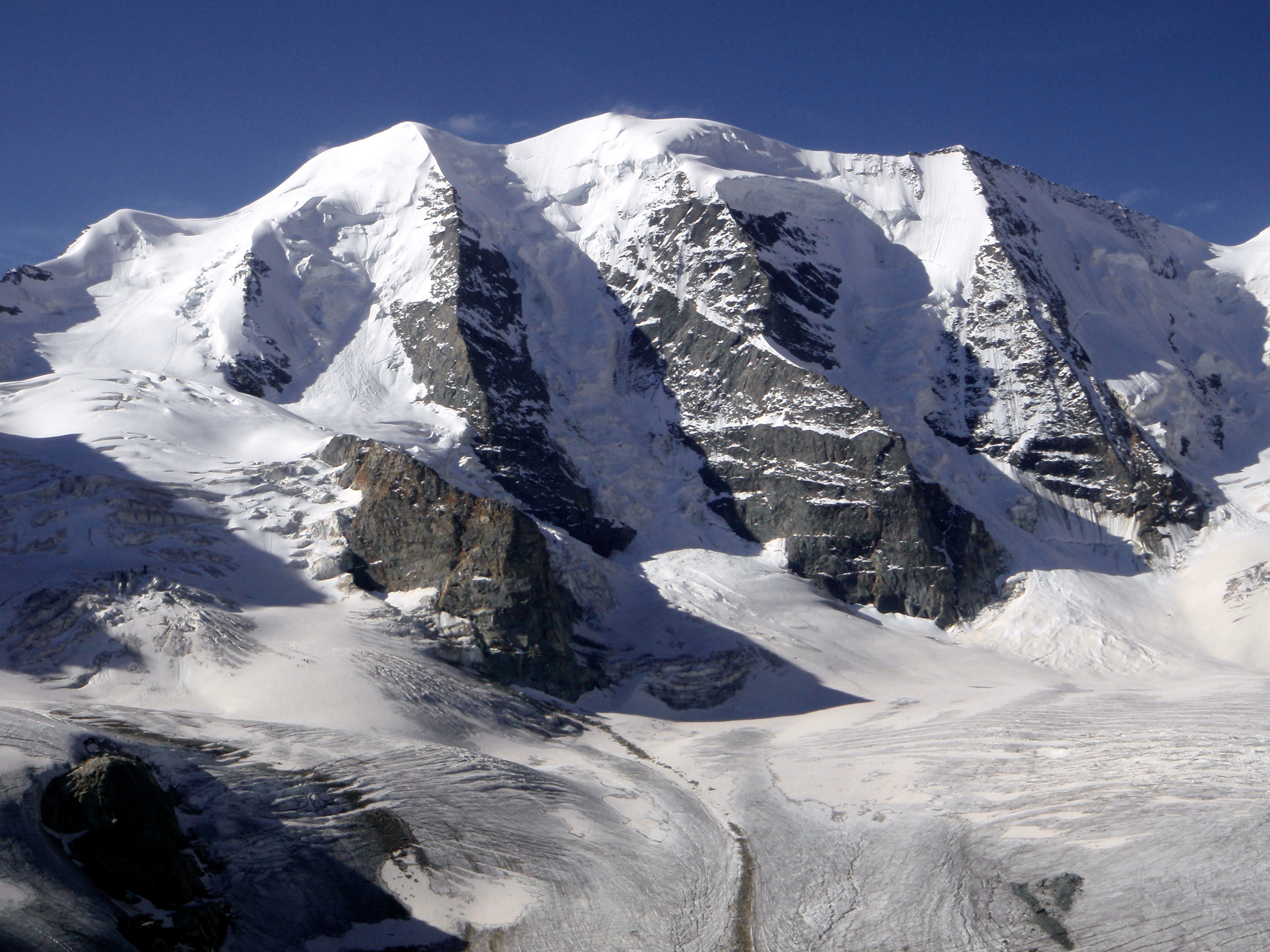
Piz Palü as seen from Diavolezza

The film was shot from January to June 1929 in the Bernina Range in the Alps. Work was divided between the two directors. Arnold Fanck was responsible for the location shots in the mountains, G. W. Pabst was responsible for the indoor shots and was advising Fanck in matters of dramaturgy. The set design was by Ernő Metzner, the cinematography by Fanck's long-time collaborators Sepp Allgeier, Richard Angst and Hans Schneeberger. Fanck would continue to work with actors Leni Riefenstahl and Ernst Udet in the films Storm over Mont Blanc (1930) and S.O.S. Eisberg (1933).

== Distribution ==
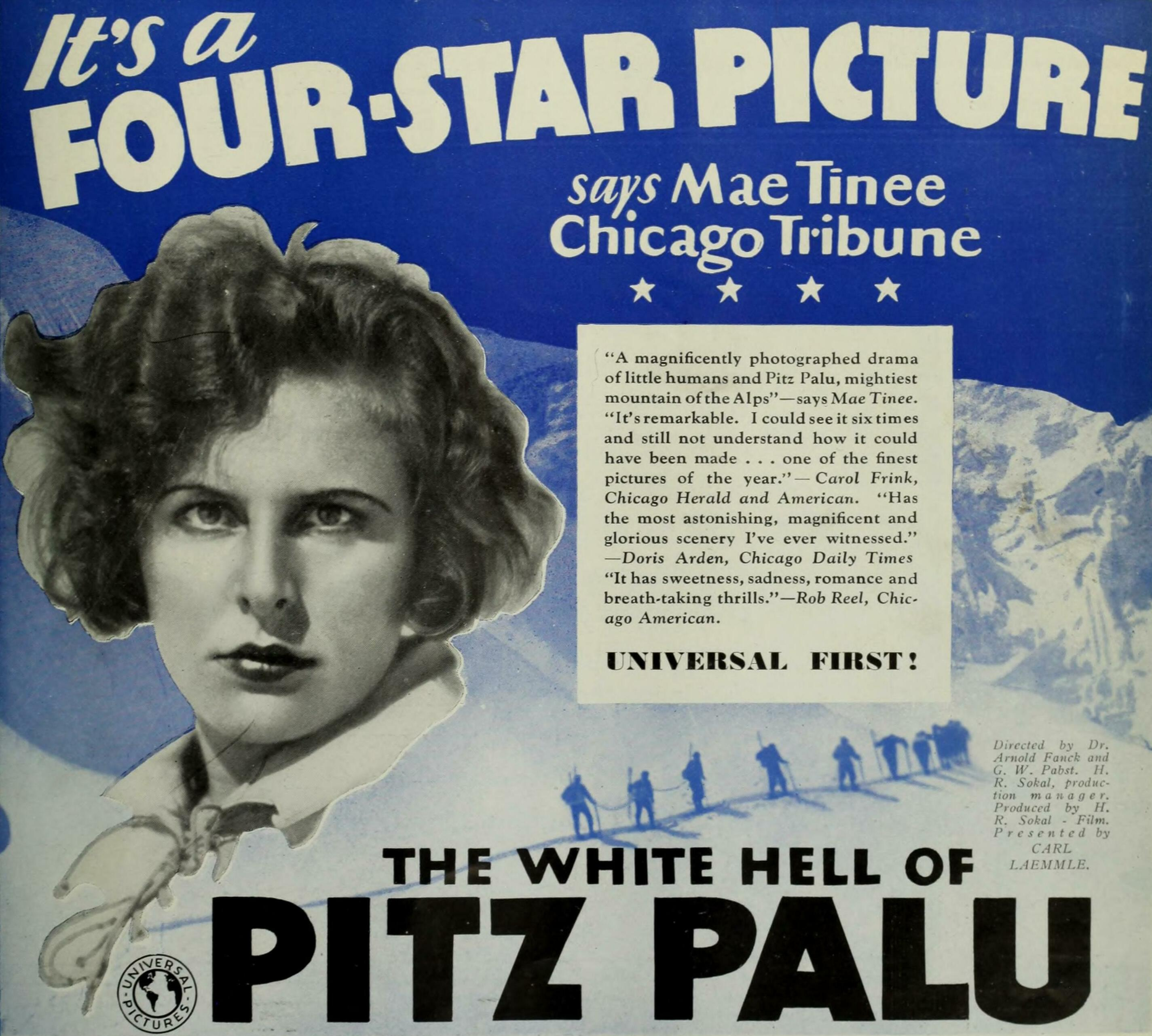
The White Hell of the Pitz Palu movie ad in The Film Daily, 1930

On 11 October 1929 the film premiered in Vienna. In Germany the film had its premiere in the same year on 1 November in Stuttgart. The official German premiere was on 15 November 1929 in Berlin. In the first four weeks the film was seen by more than 100,000 people at the UFA Palast in Berlin, at this time Germany's largest and most important movie theater.

In 1930 a Synchronized sound film version in English was produced by Universal Pictures (who had acquired the rights and copyright for the film within the United States) and this version was released internationally with the intertitles translated into the appropriate language. The sound version featured the theme song "Loving You" with lyrics by Bernie Grossman and music by Heinz Roemheld. This was the version seen by most audiences outside of Germany.

In 1935 a German s second Synchronzied sound film version with a film score by Giuseppe Becce was produced but was only released within Europe. With the Nazi regime in power since 1933, all nightclub scenes with the Jewish actor Kurt Gerron (who was later murdered in Auschwitz concentration camp in 1944) were cut from this release, and the film shortened to 90 minutes.

The original version of Die weiße Hölle vom Piz Palü was lost until 1996. The film was restored in 1997 by the German Federal Film Archive. According to a prologue for the restored version, it was made from an extant nitrate print, as opposed to a negative print which is considered to be lost. The original film score by Willy Schmidt-Gentner is still lost.

== Critical response ==
The White Hell of Piz Palu was well received, both critically and commercially. The film premiered in Vienna and Hamburg to critical praise. At the film's opening in Berlin's Ufa Palast am Zoo on 15 November 1929, the film became the second-highest box-office hit of the year in Germany.

The film was equally well received at its United States premiere at New York's Roxy Theater in September 1930.

In his review for The New York Times, Mordaunt Hall praised the film for its "beautifully photographed sequences". Hall concluded:

Despite its surface simplicity there is a swift undercurrent of tenseness and anticipation that carries one along through the avalanches, up the precipitous and threatening mountainside and finally to the climax of the rescue. Leni Riefenstahl is convincing as Maria, the brave girl of the group, and Gustav Diesel as Dr. Krafft appears to advantage as the disillusioned searcher.

In a retrospective review, American film critic Pauline Kael commented:

An example of a genre that died, this film of precipices, avalanches, and suffering produces very mixed emotions, but however one feels about it, it is visually stunning.

Author and film critic Leonard Maltin awarded the film three and a half out of four stars, praising the film's cinematography and direction.

The film is considered Fanck's most successful film and Riefenstahl's best acting performance. It also became the second biggest box office hit of the year in Germany. In a list of the 100 most important German films, compiled in 1994 by the Association of German Cinémathèques, The White Hell of Pitz Palu was placed at #91.

The film's poster is shown in the 2009 Quentin Tarantino film Inglourious Basterds as Shoshanna (Melanie Laurent) is taking down the marquee lettering from her theatre, and the film is later referenced in the Tavern-Rendezvous scene by the British paratrooper Archie Hicox, who formerly studied Germany's cinema of the 1920s.

== Remake ==
A remake with the same title directed by Rolf Hansen and starring Hans Albers and Liselotte Pulver was produced in 1950.
