= Mountain film =

Film genre focusing on mountaineering

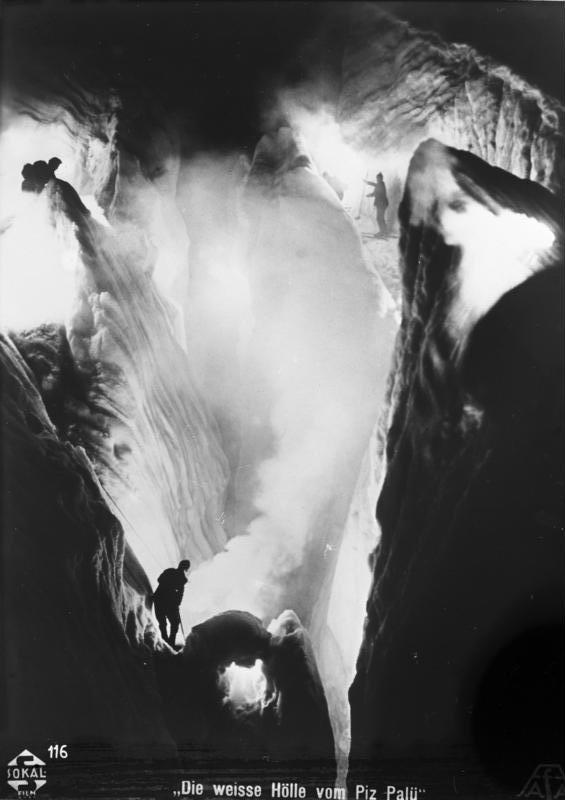
A still from the 1929 German film The White Hell of Pitz Palu.

A mountain film is a film genre that focuses on mountaineering and especially the battle of human against nature. In addition to mere adventure, the protagonists who return from the mountain come back changed, usually gaining wisdom and enlightenment.

== Bergfilme ==
Although the first mountain film, depicting the ascent of the Mont Blanc by the American climber Frank Ormiston-Smith, was released in 1903, the mountain film genre is most associated with the German Bergfilme (singular: Bergfilm) released in the 1920s. Some critics describe the German mountain film as an indigenous national / cultural genre, comparable to the American western.

Das Wunder des Schneeschuhs (1920)

The most important director of mountain films was Dr. Arnold Fanck. According to an essay by Doug Cummings in the DVD release of the landmark The Holy Mountain (1926), Fanck shot his first motion picture in 1913, and after serving in World War I, purchased a rare Ernemann slow-motion camera, taught himself to shoot on location during an expedition to climb the Jungfrau, taught himself to edit on his mother's kitchen table, and distributed the finished product himself. The film was eventually called Das Wunder des Schneeschuhs (The Wonders of Skiing, 1920) and was an instant success.

The young interpretive dancer Leni Riefenstahl was mesmerized by Fanck's fifth feature, Mountain of Destiny (1924), and successfully pursued Fanck and his star Luis Trenker, convincing them to make her the star of The Holy Mountain. It took three days to write and over a year to film on location in the Alps. This started Riefenstahl's own career as a filmmaker. Fanck went on to produce the ski-chase The White Ecstasy (1931) with Riefenstahl and legendary Austrian skier Hannes Schneider, then in turn served as Riefenstahl's editor on her 1932 film The Blue Light, which brought her to the attention of Adolf Hitler. The popularity of the German mountain films waned, then disappeared, in the run-up to World War II.

== Modern mountain films ==
Mountain films pose unusual difficulties for the filmmaking process; although parts can and have been shot in studios, filming on location presents practical challenges such as low temperatures, variable weather, and the objective dangers of the mountain environment. Directors may "cheat" by filming the actors in a less dangerous area, such as on the slopes of a ski resort, and intersperse with shots of the real location taken with a telephoto lens.

Although experienced climbers are often used, in roles ranging from consulting to standing in for the actors, the resulting film may not seem particularly logical to an audience knowledgeable about climbing. For instance, a rescuer in the film may take a hard, but dramatic-looking route, even though in real life, time is of the essence and rescuers will always go by the easiest available route.

== International Alliance for Mountain Film ==
The International Alliance for Mountain Film (IAMF) is an organization committed to the future of mountain film. IAMF was set up in February 2000 and founding members of the alliance included film festivals in Autrans, France; Banff, Canada; Cervinia, Italy; Graz, Austria; Lugano, Switzerland; Les Diablerets, Switzerland; Torello, Spain; and Trento, Italy and one museum, Museo Nazionale della Montagna in Turin, Italy.

Soon other film festivals joined IAMF over time, which is now composed by twenty members from some of the most important mountain film festivals in the world and one museum, Museo Nazionale della Montagna in Turin, Italy, representing 17 countries of Europe, Asia, and North and South America. IAMF has now become one of the main point of reference concerning mountain filming.

The following festivals are today members of IAMF, in addition to Museo Nazionale della Montagna in Turin.

Name	Since	City	Country	When	Website
Festival International du Film de Montagne	1984	Autrans	France	first week in December	
Banff Mountain Film Festival	1976	Banff	Canada	beginning of November	
International Film Festival for Mountains	1998	Bansko	Bulgaria	November	
International Mountain Film Festival Domžale	2007	Domžale	Slovenia	April	
Dundee Mountain Film Festival	1983	Dundee	Scotland	last weekend of November	
Internationales Berg und Abenteuer Filmfestival	1986	Graz	Austria	second weekend of November	
Kathmandu International Mountain Film Festival	2000	Kathmandu	Nepal	beginning of December	
Kendal Mountain Film Festival	1980	Kendal	Great Britain	third weekend in November	
Festival du film des Diablerets	1969	Les Diablerets	Switzerland	last week of September	
Festival dei Festival	1993	Lugano	Switzerland	beginning of June	
Moscow International Festival of Mountaineering and Adventure Films "Vertical"	1996	Moscow	Russia	April	
Medzinárodný Festival Horských Filmov Poprad	1993	Poprad	Slovakia	second week of October	
Taos Mountain Film Festival	2001	Taos	United States	second week in October	
Internationales Bergfilmfestival Tegernsee	2003	Tegernsee	Germany	third weekend in October	
Mezinárodni Horolezecký Filmový Festival	1980	Teplice nad Metují	Czech Republic	last weekend in August	
Festival de Cinema de Muntanya i Aventura de Torelló	1983	Torelló	Spain	third week in November	
Trento Film Festival	1952	Trento	Italy	last week of April and the first week of May	
Festival Internacional De Cine De Montaña Ushuaia Shh...	2007	Ushuaia	Argentina	second half of August	
Spotkania z Filmem Górskim	2007	Zakopane	Poland	first half of September	

There are many other mountain film festivals too which are not part of the alliance, such as the Edinburgh Mountain Film Festival and Mountainfilm in Telluride.

According to the website for the Alliance, "the Alliance determines that one of its first priorities is to inform audiences and filmmakers about the global film festival opportunities. As well, information is shared on films, programming and technology, promotion and ticketing and funding challenges. An agreement emerges to take every opportunity to cross-promote mountain film festivals around the world and to meet twice a year at member festival events."

IAMF created also the IAMF Grand Prix in order to recognize career leaders in mountain film.

Recipients of the IAMF Grand Prix:

- 2002 – Gerhard Baaur
- 2003 – Leo Dickinson
- 2004 – Fulvio Mariani
- 2005 – Jean-Pierre Bailly
- 2006 – Directorate General for Television Switzerland
- 2007 – Michael Brown
- 2008 – Sebastián Álvaro
- 2009 – Lothar Brandler
- 2010 – Hans-Jürgen Panitz

== List of mountain films ==
- The Vulture Wally (1921), remade 1940, 1956, 1988 and 2005
- The Holy Mountain (1926)
- The White Hell of Pitz Palu (1929)
- The White Ecstasy (1931)
- Das Blaue Licht (1932)
- The Rebel (1932)
- Kleine Scheidegg (1937)
- Schlitz on Mt. Washington (1937)
- Der Berg ruft (1938)
- The White Tower (1950)
- The Mountain (1956)
- Third Man on the Mountain (Banner in the Sky) (1959)
- Vertical (1967)
- The Eiger Sanction (1975)
- El Capitan (1978)
- Five Days One Summer (1982)
- The Climb (1986)
- Shoot to Kill (1988)
- K2 (1991)
- Cliffhanger (1993)
- Seven Years in Tibet (1997)
- Into Thin Air: Death on Everest (1997)
- Everest (1998)
- Vertical Limit (2000)
- Touching the Void (2003)
- North Face (2008)
- The Summit (2012)
- Everest (2015)
- Mountain (2017)
- Free Solo (2018)
- The Last Mountain (2019)
- Cholitas (2019)
- The Last Mountain (2021)

== See also ==
- List of media related to Mount Everest
