= Ernst Udet =

Luftwaffe general

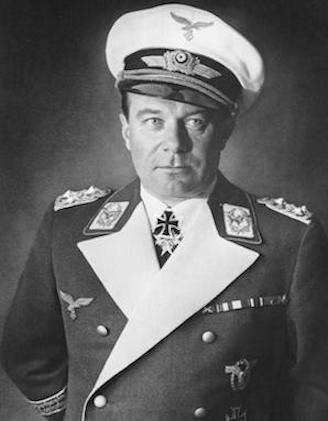
- Born: 26 April 1896; Frankfurt am Main, German Empire
- Died: 17 November 1941 (aged 45); Berlin, Nazi Germany
- Burial place: Invalidenfriedhof in Berlin
- Military career
- Allegiance: German Empire; Weimar Republic; Nazi Germany
- Branch: Luftstreitkräfte; Luftwaffe
- Service years: 1914–1919; 1934–1941
- Rank: Oberleutnant; Generaloberst
- Units: FA 68, FA(A) 206, KEK Habsheim, Jastas 4, 11, 15, 37
- Commands: Jasta 37, Jasta 4
- Conflicts: World War I World War II
- Awards: Iron Cross 1st and 2nd Class; Clasp to the Iron Cross 1st and 2nd Class; Knights Cross with Swords of the House Order of Hohenzollern; Hanseatic Cross Hamburg & Lübeck versions; Honour Cross of the World War 1914/1918; Wehrmacht Long Service Award 4th and 3rd Class; Pour le Mérite; Pilot's Badge German Empire; Pilot/Observer Badge in Gold with Diamonds; Knight's Cross of the Iron Cross

Ernst Udet (26 April 1896 – 17 November 1941) was a German pilot during World War I and a Luftwaffe Colonel-General (Generaloberst) during World War II.

Udet joined the Imperial German Air Service in April 1915 at the age of 19, and eventually became a notable flying ace of World War I, scoring 62 confirmed victories. The highest scoring German fighter pilot to survive that war, and the second-highest scoring after Manfred von Richthofen, his commander in the Flying Circus, Udet rose to become a squadron commander under Richthofen, and later under Hermann Göring. Udet spent the 1920s and early 1930s as a stunt pilot, international barnstormer, light-aircraft manufacturer, and playboy.

On 1 May 1933 Udet joined the Nazi Party. He became involved in the early development of the Luftwaffe (officially founded on 15 May 1933), where he was appointed director of research and development. Influential in the adoption of dive-bombing techniques as well as of the Stuka dive bomber, by 1939 Udet had risen to the post of Chief of Procurement and Supply for the Luftwaffe. The stress of the position and his distaste for administrative duties led to Udet developing alcoholism.

The launch of Operation Barbarossa on 22 June 1941, combined with issues with the Luftwaffe's needs for equipment outstripping Germany's production capacity and increasingly poor relations with the Nazi Party, caused Udet to choose suicide on 17 November 1941 by shooting himself in the head.

== Early life ==
Ernst Udet was born on 26 April 1896, in Frankfurt am Main, German Empire. Udet grew up in Munich, and was known from his early childhood for his sunny temperament and fascination with aviation. In his youth he spent considerable time at a nearby airplane factory and an army airship detachment. In 1909, he helped found the Munich Aero-Club. After crashing a glider he and a friend constructed, he finally flew in 1913 with a test pilot in the nearby Otto Works owned by Gustav Otto, which he often visited.

== Military career ==
=== World War I ===
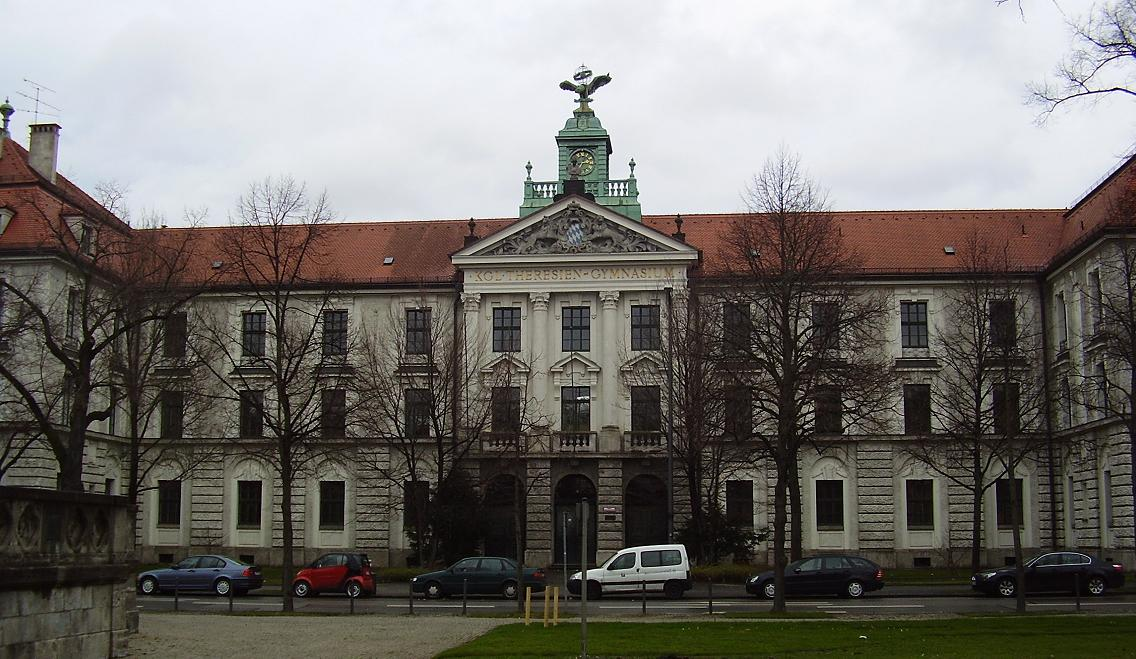
Udet attended the Theresien-Gymnasium in Munich.

Shortly after the beginning of World War I, Udet attempted to enlist in the Imperial German Army on 2 August 1914, but at only 160 cm (5 ft 3.0 in) tall he did not then qualify for enlistment. Later that month, when the Allgemeiner Deutscher Automobil-Club appealed for volunteers with motorcycles, Udet applied and was accepted. Udet's father had given him a motorcycle when he had passed his first year examination, and along with four friends, Udet was posted to the 26. Württembergischen Reserve Division as a "messenger rider." After injuring his shoulder when his motorcycle hit a crater from an artillery shell explosion, he was sent to a military hospital, and his motorcycle was sent for repairs. When Udet tried to track down the 26th Division, he was unable to find it and decided to serve in the vehicle depot in Namur. During this time, he met officers from the Chauny flying sector, who advised him to transfer as an aerial observer. Before he received his orders, the army dispensed with the volunteer motorcyclists, and Udet was sent back to the recruiting officials.

Udet tried to return to the fighting, but he was unable to get into either the pilot or aircraft mechanic training the army offered. However, he learned that if he were a trained pilot, he would be immediately accepted into army aviation. Through a family friend, Gustav Otto, owner of the aircraft factory he had hung out around in his youth, Udet received private flight training. This cost him 2,000 Deutsche Marks (about $400 in 1915 U.S. dollars) and new bathroom equipment from his father's firm. Udet received his civilian pilot's license at the end of April 1915 and was immediately accepted by the Imperial German Air Service.

==== Artillery ranging ====
Udet at first flew in Feld Flieger-Abteilung 206 (FFA 206)—an observation unit—as an Unteroffizier (non-commissioned) pilot with observer Leutnant Bruno Justinius. He and his observer won the Iron Cross (2nd class for Udet and 1st class for his lieutenant) for nursing their damaged Aviatik B.I two-seater back to German lines after a shackle on a wing-cable snapped. Justinius had climbed out to hold the wing and balance it, rather than land behind the enemy lines and be captured. After this structural failure, and a similar incident in which Leutnant Winter and Vizefeldwebel Preiss lost their lives, the Aviatik B was retired from active service.

Later, Udet was court-martialed for losing an aircraft in an incident the flying corps considered a result of bad judgement. Overloaded with fuel and bombs, the aircraft stalled after a sharp bank and plunged to the ground. Miraculously, both Udet and Justinius survived with only minor injuries. Udet was placed under arrest in the guardhouse for seven days. On his way out of the guardhouse, he was asked to fly Lieutenant Hartmann to observe a bombing raid on Belfort. A bomb thrown by hand by the leutnant became stuck in the landing gear, but Udet performed aerobatics and managed to shake it loose. As soon as the Air Staff Officer heard about Udet's performance during the incident, he ordered Udet transferred to the fighter command.

==== Fighter pilot ====
Udet was assigned a new Fokker to fly to his new fighter unit—FFA 68—at Habsheim. Mechanically defective, the plane crashed into a hangar when he took off, so he was then given an older Fokker to fly. In this aircraft, he experienced his first aerial combat, which almost ended in disaster. While lining up on a French Caudron, Udet found he could not bring himself to fire on another person and was subsequently fired on by the Frenchman. A bullet grazed his cheek and smashed his flying goggles. Udet survived the encounter, but from then on learned to attack aggressively and began scoring victories, downing his first French opponent on 18 March 1916. On that occasion, he had scrambled to attack two French aircraft, but instead found himself facing a formation of 23 enemy aircraft. He dived from above and behind, giving his Fokker E.III full throttle, and opened fire on a Farman F.40 from close range. Udet pulled away, leaving the flaming bomber trailing smoke, only to see the observer fall from the rear seat of the stricken craft. He later described the incident: "The fuselage of the Farman dives down past me like a giant torch... A man, his arms and legs spread out like a frog's, falls past--the observer. At the moment, I don't think of them as human beings. I feel only one thing--victory, triumph, victory." The victory won Udet the Iron Cross First Class, bestowed on 20 March 1916. On 17 April, he was awarded the Honorary Cup for the Victor in Aerial Combat, and on 4 November of that year, the Kingdom of Württemberg awarded him the Wilhelm Cross.

That year, FFA 68 was renamed Kampfeinsitzer Kommando Habsheim before becoming Jagdstaffel 15 on 28 September 1916. Udet claimed five more victories, before transferring to Jasta 37 in June 1917. In the first of his victories on 12 October 1916, Udet forced a French Breguet to land safely in German territory, then landed nearby to prevent its destruction by its crew. The bullet-punctured tires on Udet's Fokker flipped the plane forward onto its top wings and fuselage. Udet and the French pilot eventually shook hands next to the Frenchman's aircraft. In January 1917, Udet was commissioned as a Leutnant der Reserve (lieutenant of reserves). The same month, Jasta 15 re-equipped with the Albatros D.III, a new fighter with twin synchronized Maschinengewehr 08 machine guns. On 15 August 1917 he shot down his 8th victory-a Sopwith Strutter 1/2 of 43d Squadron RFC.

During his service with Jasta 15, Udet later wrote he had encountered Georges Guynemer, a notable French ace, in single combat at 5,000 m (16,000 ft). Guynemer, who preferred to hunt enemy planes alone, by this time was the leading French ace with more than 30 victories. Udet saw Guynemer and they circled each other, looking for an opening and testing each other's turning abilities. They were close enough for Udet to read the "Vieux" of "Vieux Charles" written on Guynemer's Spad S.VII. The opponents tried every aerobatic trick they knew and Guynemer fired a burst through Udet's upper wing, however maneuvered for advantage. Once Udet had Guynemer in his sights, his machine guns jammed and while pretending to dogfight he pounded on them with his fists, desperate to unjam them. Guynemer realized his predicament and instead of taking advantage of it, simply waved a farewell and flew away. Udet wrote of the fight, "For seconds, I forgot that the man across from me was Guynemer, my enemy. It seems as though I were sparring with an older comrade over our own airfield." Udet felt that Guynemer had spared him because he wanted a fair fight, while others have suggested that Guynemer had a gun jam himself, feared that Udet would ram him in desperation, or the French ace was so impressed with Udet's skills that he hoped they might meet again on equal terms.

Eventually, every pilot in Jasta 15 was killed except Udet and his commander, Heinrich Gontermann, who said to Udet: "The bullets fall from the hand of God ... Sooner or later they will hit us." Udet applied for a transfer to Jasta 37, and Gontermann was killed three months later when the upper wing of his new Fokker Dr. 1 tore off as he was flying it for the first time. Gontermann lingered for twenty four hours without awakening and Udet later remarked, "It was a good death." By late November, Udet was a triple ace and Jastaführer, modelling his attacks after those of Guynemer, coming in high out of the sun to pick off the rear aircraft in a squadron before the others knew what was happening. Having witnessed one of these attacks, his commander in Jasta 37 Kurt Grasshoff, on being transferred, selected Udet for command over more senior men. Udet's ascension to command on 7 November 1917, was followed six days later by award of the Knight's Cross with Swords of the Royal House Order of Hohenzollern. Despite his seemingly frivolous nature, drinking late into the night, and womanizing lifestyle, Udet proved an excellent squadron commander. He spent many hours coaching new fighter pilots, with an emphasis on marksmanship as being essential for success.

==== The Flying Circus ====
Udet's success attracted attention for his skill, earning him an invitation to join the "Flying Circus", Jagdgeschwader 1 (JG 1), an elite unit of German fighter aces under the command of Manfred von Richthofen, popularly known as the Red Baron. Richthofen drove up to Udet one day as he was trying to pitch a tent in Flanders in the rain, pointing out that Udet had 20 kills, Richthofen said, "Then you would actually seem ripe for us. Would you like to?", which Udet accepted. After watching him shoot down an artillery spotter by frontal attack, Richthofen gave Udet command of Jasta 11, von Richthofen's former squadron command. The group commanded by Richthofen also contained Jastas 4, 6 and 10. Udet's enthusiasm for Richthofen was unbounded, who demanded total loyalty and dedication from his pilots, immediately cashiering anyone who fell out of line. At the same time, Richthofen treated them with every consideration and when it came time to requisition supplies he traded favors for autographed photos of himself that read: "Dedicated to my esteemed fighting companion." Udet remarked that because of the signed photographs, " ... sausage and ham never ran out." One night, the squadron invited a captured British flyer for dinner, treating him as a guest. When he excused himself for the bathroom, the Germans secretly watched to see if he would try to escape. On his return the Englishman said, "I would never forgive myself for disappointing such hosts"; the British flyer did escape later from another unit.

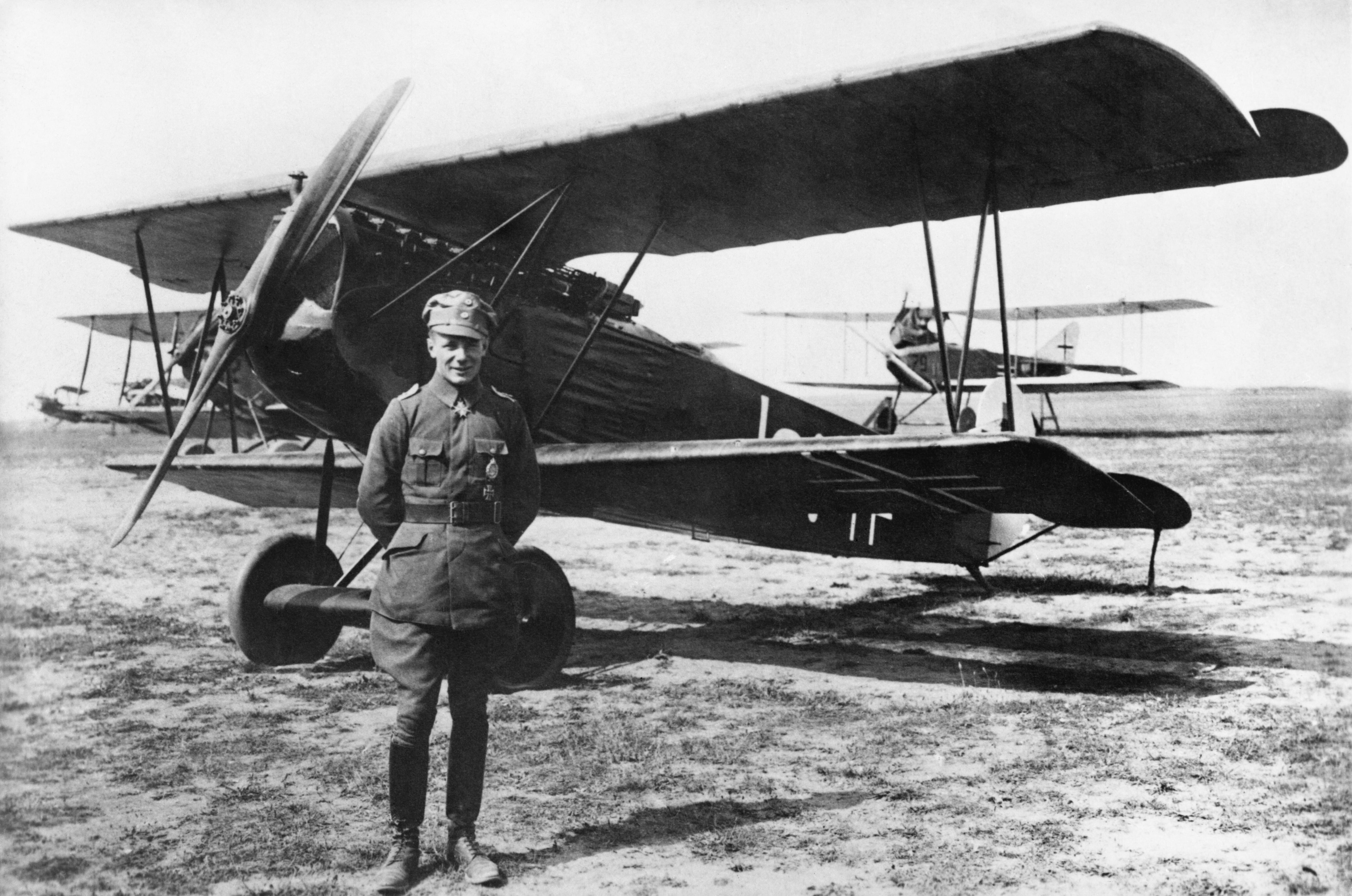
Ernst Udet beside his Fokker DVII nicknamed "Lo"

Richthofen was killed in April 1918 in France, where Udet was not at the front as he had been sent on leave due to a painful ear infection which he avoided having treated as long as he could. Udet said about Richthofen: "He was the least complicated man I ever knew. Entirely Prussian and the greatest of soldiers," before returning to JG 1 against the doctor's advice and remained there to the end of the war, commanding Jasta 4. While at home, Udet had reacquainted himself with his childhood sweetheart, Eleanor "Lo" Zink. Notified that he had received the Pour le Mérite, he had one made up in advance so that he could impress her, and painted her name on the side of his Albatros fighters and Fokker D VII. Also on the tail of his Fokker D VII was the message "Du doch nicht" - "Definitely not you." Udet scored 20 victories in August 1918 alone, mainly against British aircraft and became a national hero with 62 confirmed victories to his credit.

On 29 June 1918, Udet was one of the early fliers to be saved by parachuting from a disabled aircraft, when he jumped after a clash with a French Breguet. His harness caught on the rudder and he had to break off the rudder tip to escape. His parachute did not open until he was 75 m (250 ft) from the ground, causing him to sprain his ankle on landing. On 28 September 1918, Udet was wounded in the thigh, from which he was still recovering on Armistice Day, 11 November 1918, when the war ended in Germany's defeat.

=== Inter-war period ===
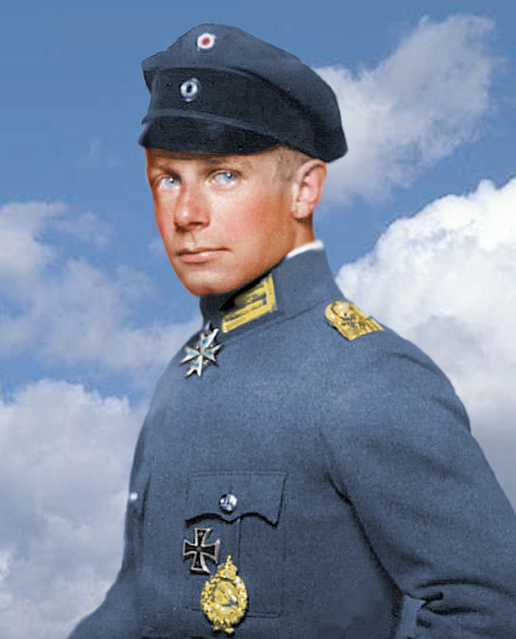
Ernst Udet, a recoloured portrait

After the war, on his way home from the military hospital, Udet had to defend himself against a Communist who wished to rip the medals off his chest. Udet and Robert Greim performed mock dogfights at weekends for the POW Relief Organization, using surplus aircraft in Bavaria. He was invited to start the first International Air Service between Germany and Austria, but after the first flight the Entente Commission confiscated his aircraft. Udet married Eleanor "Lo" Zink on 25 February 1920, however the marriage lasted less than three years and they were divorced on 16 February 1923. The marriage is believed to have ended due to Udet having had many affairs. His talents were numerous: among these were juggling, drawing cartoons, and party entertainment.

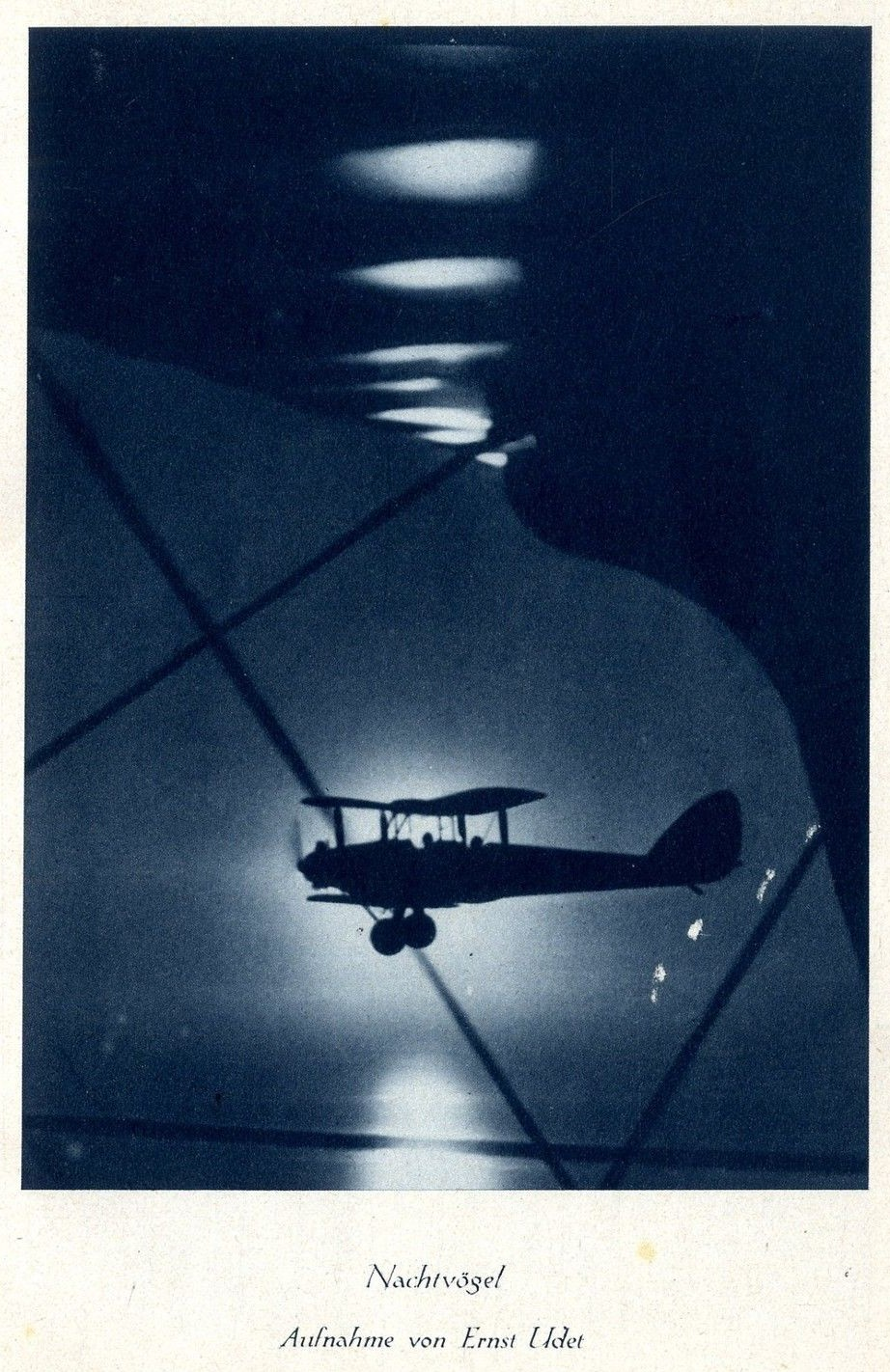
A picture taken by Ernst Udet, c. 1930

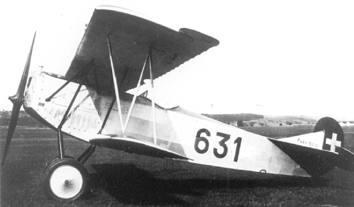
Swiss Fokker DVII flown by Udet in 1936. See story at .

During the inter-war period, Udet was known primarily for his work as a stunt pilot and for playboy-like behavior. He flew for movies and for airshows (e.g. picking a cloth from the ground with his wingtip, flying under low bridges and completing loops only several meters from the ground). One stunt only Udet performed was successive loops with the last complete after turning off the engine mid air and landing the aircraft in a sideways glide. He appeared with Leni Riefenstahl in three films: The White Hell of Pitz Palu (1929), Stürme über dem Mont Blanc (1930), and S.O.S. Eisberg (1933). Udet's stunt pilot work in films took him to California. In the October 1933 issue of New Movie Magazine, there is a photo of Carl Laemmle, Jr.'s party for Udet in Hollywood. Laemmle was head of Universal Studios which made SOS Eisberg, a US-German co-production. Udet was invited to attend the National Air Races at Cleveland, Ohio. In 1935 he played himself in Miracle of Flight (1935; 79 mins.) directed by Heinz Paul. His co-star Jürgen Ohlsen, who had previously starred in the extremely popular film Hitlerjunge Quex: Ein Film vom Opfergeist der deutschen Jugend, played a youth who lost his pilot father in World War I and was befriended and encouraged by Udet, his idol. In the Berlin 1936 Summer Olympics Udet entered the arts competition literature category with his autobiography, Mein Fliegerleben (My Flying Life) (published 1935).

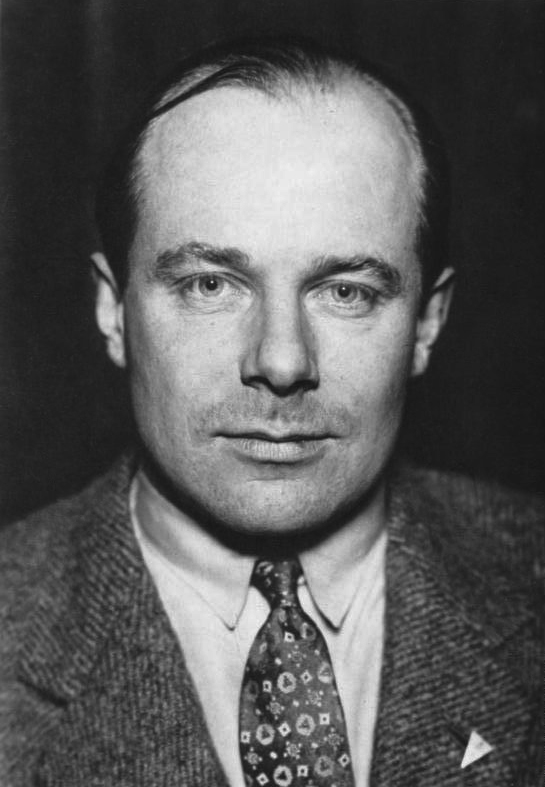
Ernst Udet in 1928

These efforts were good publicity for Udet. An American, William Pohl of Milwaukee, telephoned him with an offer to back an aircraft manufacturing company. Udet Flugzeugbau was born in a shed in Milbertshofen. Its intent was to build small aircraft that the general public could fly. It soon ran into trouble with the Entente Commission and transferred its operations to a beehive and chicken coop factory.

The first aeroplane that Udet's company produced was the U2. Udet took the second model, the U4, to the Wilbur Cup race in Buenos Aires at the expense of Aero Club Aleman. It was outclassed, and the club wanted him to do cigarette commercials to reimburse them for the expense, but he refused. He was rescued by the Chief of the Argentinian Railways, a man of Swedish descent named Tornquist, who settled the debt.

In 1924, Udet left Udet Flugzeugbau when they decided to build a four-engine aircraft, the U11 Kondor which was larger and not for the general population. He and another friend from the war, Angermund, started an exhibition flying enterprise in Germany, which was also successful, but Udet remarked, "In time this too begins to get tiresome. ... We stand in the present, fighting for a living. It isn't always easy. ... But the thoughts wander back to the times when it was worthwhile to fight for your life."

Udet and another wartime comrade—Suchocky—became pilots to an African filming expedition. The cameraman was another veteran, Schneeberger, whom Udet called "Flea," and the guide was Siedentopf, a former East African estate owner. Udet described one incident in Africa in which lions jumped up to claw at the low-flying aircraft, one of them removing a strip of Suchocky's wing surface. Udet engaged in hunting while in Africa.

=== World War II ===
==== Building the Luftwaffe ====
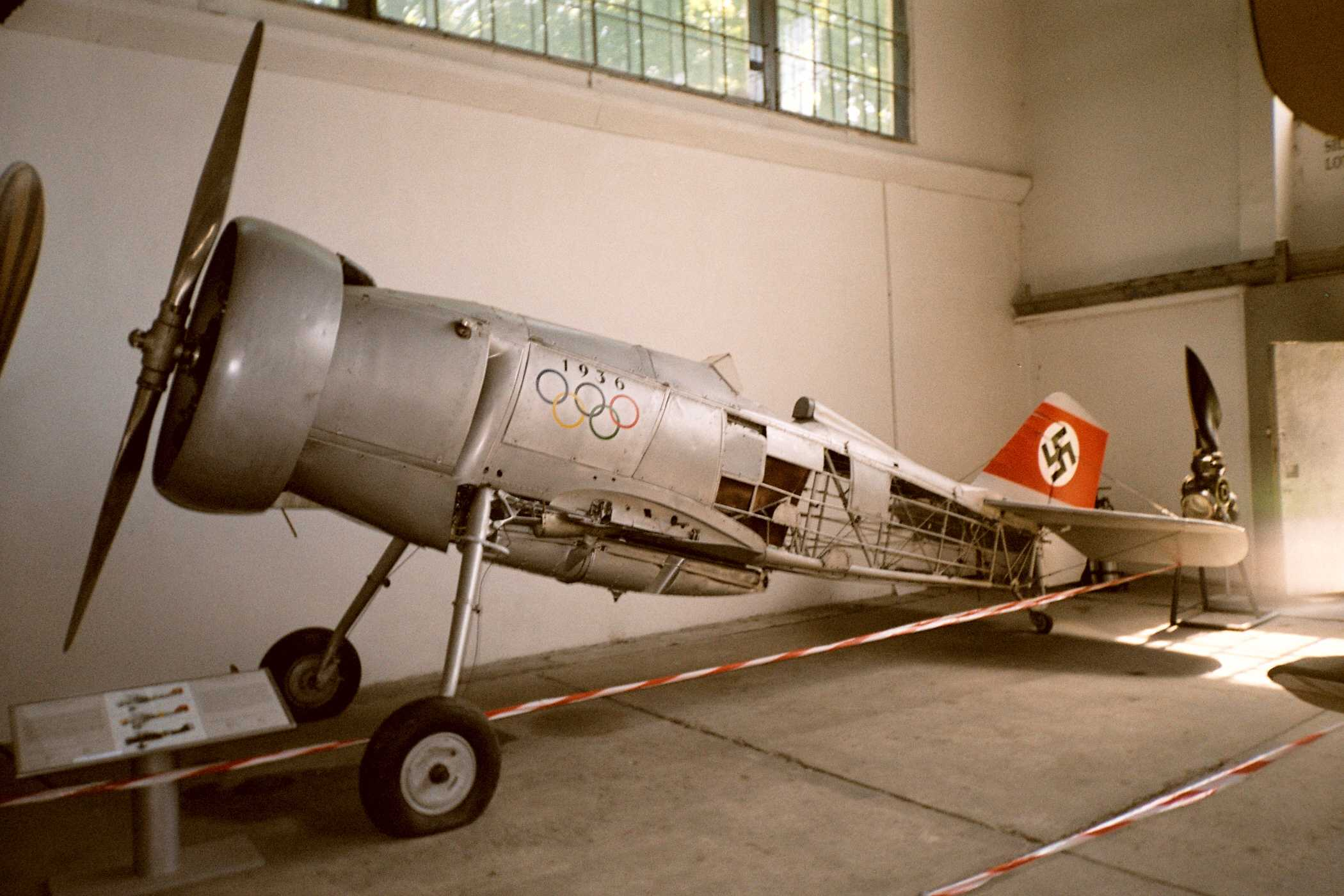
Udet's Curtiss Hawk Export (D-IRIK) as on display in the Polish Aviation Museum in Kraków.

Though not interested in politics, Udet joined the Nazi party in 1933 when Hermann Göring promised to buy him two new U.S.-built Curtiss Hawk II biplanes (export designation of the F11C-2 Goshawk Helldiver). The planes were used for evaluation purposes and thus indirectly influenced the German idea of dive bombing aeroplanes, such as the Junkers Ju 87 (Stuka) dive bombers. They were also used for aerobatic shows held during the 1936 Summer Olympics. Udet piloted one of them, which survived the war and is now on display in the Polish Aviation Museum.

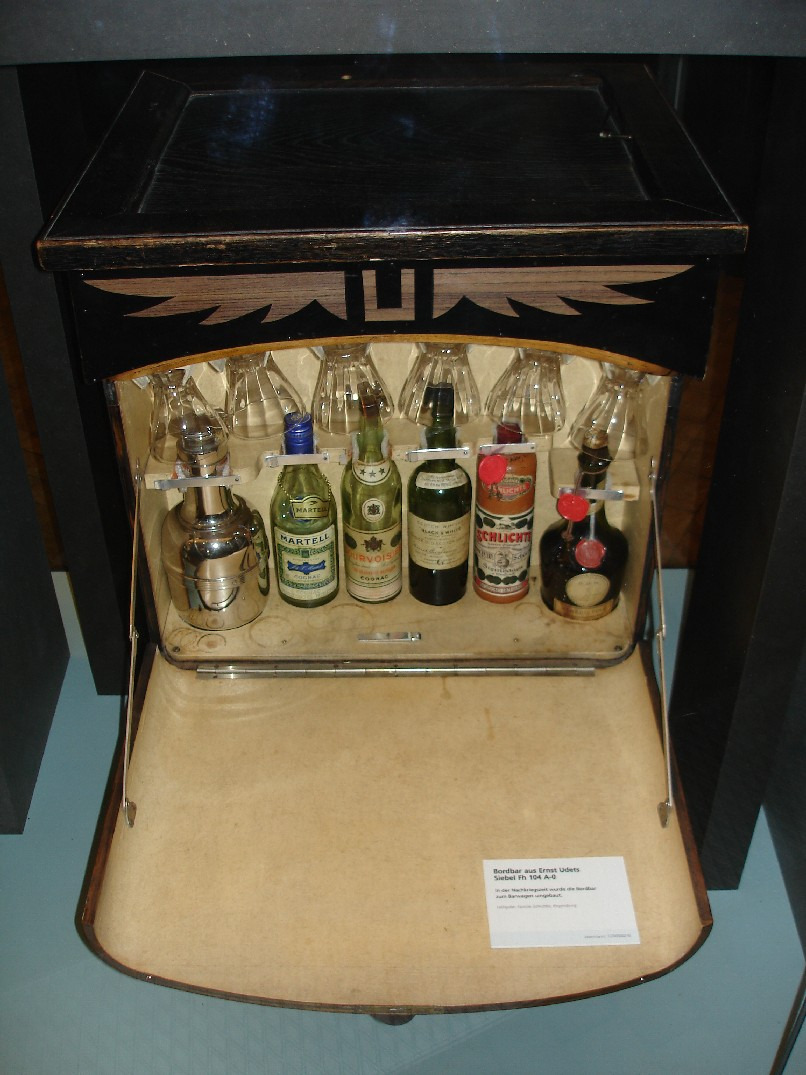
Udets's board bar from his Siebel Fh 104 A-0 on display in the Deutsches Technikmuseum Berlin.

After the trials of the Ju 87, a confidential directive issued on 9 June 1936 by Wolfram von Richthofen called for the cessation of all further Ju 87 development, although the Ju 87 had been awarded top marks and was about to be accepted. However, Udet immediately rejected von Richthofen's instructions and Ju 87 development continued. Udet became a major proponent of the dive bomber, taking credit for having introduced it to the Luftwaffe. On 9 June 1936 he had, through his political connections, been named Chief of the Technical Office, T-Amt, (the development wing of the Reich Ministry of Aviation). Udet had no real interest in this job nor a particular aptitude for it, especially the bureaucracy of it, and the pressure led to him developing an addiction to alcohol, drinking large amounts of brandy and cognac.

In January 1939, Udet visited Italian North Africa (Africa Settentrionale Italiana, or ASI), accompanying Maresciallo dell'Aria (Marshal of the Air Force) Italo Balbo on a flight, because at the time there were distinct signs of German military and diplomatic co-operation with the Italians. On 1 February 1939 Udet became Luftwaffe Generalluftzeugmeister (Chief of Procurement and Supply), responsible for all aircraft production, armament and supply. This was a massive organization supervising over 26 departments and, again, requiring organizational qualities for which Udet was not best equipped.

When World War II began, his internal conflicts grew more intense as aircraft production requirements were much more than the German industry could supply, given limited access to raw materials such as aluminium. Göring responded to this problem by simply lying about it to Adolf Hitler, and after the Luftwaffe's defeat in the Battle of Britain, Göring tried to deflect Hitler's ire by blaming Udet. On 22 June 1941, the launch of Operation Barbarossa, the German invasion of the Soviet Union, drove Udet further into despair. In April and May 1941, Udet had led a German delegation inspecting the Soviet aviation industry in accordance with the Molotov–Ribbentrop Pact. Udet informed Göring that the Soviet air force and aviation industry were very strong and technically advanced. Göring decided not to report this to Hitler, hoping that a surprise attack would quickly destroy the Soviet Union. Udet realized that the upcoming war on the Soviet Union might destroy Germany. He tried to explain this to Hitler but, torn between truth and loyalty, suffered a psychological breakdown. Göring kept Udet under control by giving him drugs at drinking parties and hunting trips. Udet's drinking and psychological condition became a problem, and Göring used Udet's dependency to manipulate him.

== Death ==
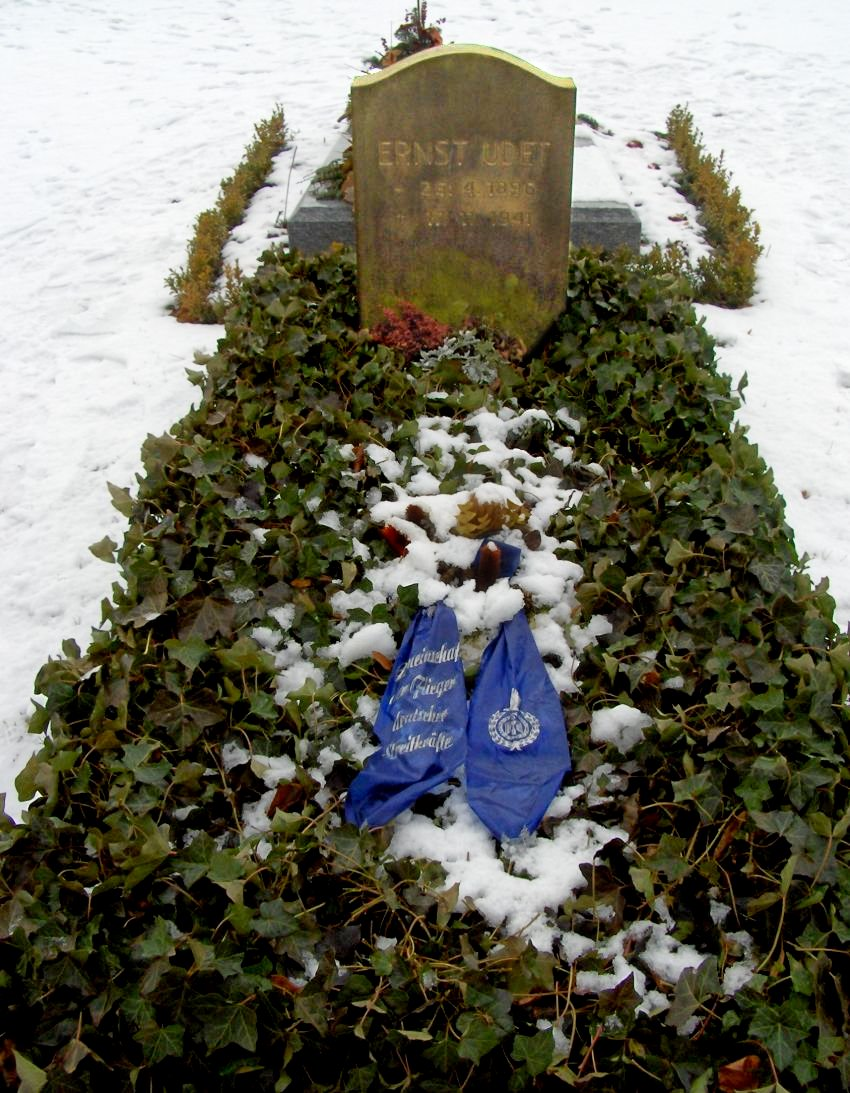
Ernst Udet's grave in Invalidenfriedhof Cemetery, Berlin

By August 1941, the pressures from the Soviet campaign were exacerbating the conflicts between Udet and State Secretary Erhard Milch. In order to attain a mandated quadrupling of production, Milch was pressing Udet for a major reorganisation of his department. Udet resisted, but by September, Göring sided with Milch and several members of Udet's staff were removed, as Milch began to assert increasing control over procurement and supply. Udet was losing his freedom of action and was clearly being eclipsed.

On 17 November 1941, Udet shot himself in the head while he was on the phone with his girlfriend, Inge Bleyle. Udet's suicide was concealed from the public, and at his funeral, he was lauded as a hero who had died in flight while he was testing a new weapon. On their way to attend Udet's funeral, the World War II fighter ace Werner Mölders died in a plane crash in Breslau, and the high Luftwaffe executive General der Flieger Helmuth Wilberg died in another plane crash near Dresden. Udet was buried next to Manfred von Richthofen in the Invalidenfriedhof Cemetery in Berlin. Mölders was buried next to Udet.

According to Udet's biography, The Fall of an Eagle, he wrote a suicide note in red pencil that included: "Ingelein, why have you left me?" and "Iron One, you are responsible for my death". "Ingelein" referred to his girlfriend, Inge Bleyle, and "Iron One" to Hermann Göring. The book The Luftwaffe War Diaries similarly states that Udet wrote "Reichsmarschall, why have you deserted me?" in red on the headboard of his bed. Evidence indicates that Udet's unhappy relationship with Göring, Erhard Milch and the Nazi Party in general was the cause of a mental breakdown.

== Portrayals ==
- Carl Zuckmayer's 1946 play Des Teufels General ("The Devil's General") was a fictional treatment of Udet's final days.
- Des Teufels General was a 1955 film version of the Zuckmeyer play, with Curd Jürgens in the title role.
- In the East German TV miniseries Ohne Kampf kein Sieg (1966) Udet is portrayed by Alfred Müller.
- In the film Von Richthofen and Brown (1971), Udet was portrayed by Robert La Tourneaux
- The character of "Ernst Kessler" in the 1975 film The Great Waldo Pepper is clearly based upon Ernst Udet. Kessler was portrayed by actor Bo Brundin. It also contains dogfighting scenes between a Fokker Dr.I and a Sopwith Camel.
- Udet is featured in the Knights of the Sky video game as an enemy German pilot.
- In the movie The Red Baron (2008), Udet is portrayed by Jiří Laštovka.
- Christian Berkel plays Udet in the television film Elly Beinhorn: Solo Flight (2014).

== See also ==
- Udet U 12
