= The Holy Mountain (1926 film) =

1926 film

- German theatrical release poster
- Directed by: Arnold Fanck
- Written by: Arnold Fanck; Hans Schneeberger
- Produced by: Harry R. Sokal
- Starring: Leni Riefenstahl; Luis Trenker; Frida Richard
- Cinematography: Arnold Fanck; Hans Schneeberger; Sepp Allgeier; Helmar Lerski
- Edited by: Arnold Fanck
- Music by: Edmund Meisel; Edmund Reisch
- Production company: UFA
- Distributed by: UFA
- Release dates: November 1926 (Austria); 17 December 1926 (Germany)
- Running time: 106 minutes
- Country: Germany
- Languages: Silent film German intertitles
- Budget: 1.5 million ℛ︁ℳ︁

The Holy Mountain (1926) by Arnold Fanck

The Holy Mountain (German: Der heilige Berg) is a 1926 German mountain film directed by Arnold Fanck and starring Leni Riefenstahl, Luis Trenker and Frida Richard. It was future filmmaker Riefenstahl's first screen appearance as an actress. Written by Arnold Fanck and Hans Schneeberger, the film is divided into nine parts, each introduced by an intertitle.

== Plot ==
Diotima is a dancer deeply moved by a vision of a man atop the highest mountain peak, an image she carries with her as she dances by the sea, longing to meet him.

Diotima performs at the Grand Hotel in a mountain resort, where Karl and his young friend Vigo are enchanted by her routine. Moved, Karl rushes into the mountains to process his emotions. Diotima later explores the mountain landscape, playing with children and lambs, and finds a stream that reminds her of ocean waves. There, she encounters Karl; upon asking him what he seeks, Karl replies, “One’s self,” and when he asks her the same question, she answers, “Beauty.”

Karl introduces Diotima to his mother and announces their engagement, though Karl's mother sadly reflects afterward that the sea and the stone can never unite. Despite his affection, Karl leaves to climb the mountain on his own, refusing to let Diotima join him. Diotima watches a ski jump competition in the village, where Vigo wins, and they spend time skiing together afterward.

In a bid to further her connection with Vigo, Diotima promises to grant him a wish should he win an upcoming race. The race, marked by the shepherd Colli, sees Vigo and Colli battling for the lead but taking a wrong turn, leaving them behind. Eventually, Vigo wins, and when he claims his wish, he embraces Diotima, just as Karl returns, seeing them together and turning away in despair without recognizing Vigo.

Consumed by jealousy, Karl contemplates suicide at the edge of a cliff. Unaware of his inner turmoil, Diotima tells Karl’s mother that when Karl returns, she will surprise him with a new dance, a “Hymn of Joy.” Vigo visits Karl’s mother to explain that he believes Diotima loves him. Karl, intent on conquering the mountains, asks Vigo to climb the dangerous Santo North face with him. Despite the perilous winter weather, Vigo tries to dissuade him, but Karl persists.

A violent storm traps Karl and Vigo on a narrow ridge, surrounded by avalanches. Vigo continues to urge Karl to descend, but Karl begins playing the accordion and asks, “Is there something you desire, down there, among the rabble?” Vigo, smiling, answers, “A dancer... Diotima.” Realizing that Vigo is the man he saw embracing Diotima, Karl becomes enraged, moving threateningly toward Vigo and causing him to fall over the edge. Karl, still tethered to Vigo, manages to hold the rope but is unable to pull Vigo back onto the ridge. Meanwhile, Diotima, who has had a premonition of something happening to Karl, refuses to perform. However, the manager forces her to go on, and her performance is interrupted by an announcement that Karl and Vigo have not returned. The audience is asked if any mountaineers are willing to volunteer to climb to the skiers’ hut to alert them, but no one steps forward. Diotima decides to climb to the skiers’ hut herself. She endures, reaching the hut where the skiers immediately begin their search for Karl and Vigo.

As the skiers struggle through the snowstorm, and Diotima and Karl’s mother anxiously wait, Vigo pleads with Karl to cut him free so that he may save himself, but Karl refuses. Exhausted and hallucinating, Karl imagines marrying Diotima in a vast ice palace. When the sun rises, Karl, still holding onto Vigo, lets both of them fall into the abyss. A skier later arrives to inform Diotima that Karl sacrificed himself, holding onto Vigo through the night.

Now adorned in black, Diotima stands by the sea, offering a sense of peace to the world’s suffering. The Holy Mountain looms above her, symbolizing the greatest human values: fidelity, truth, loyalty, and faith.

== Cast ==
- Leni Riefenstahl as Diotima
- Luis Trenker as Karl
- Frida Richard as Mother
- Ernst Petersen as Vigo
- Friedrich Schneider as Colli
- Hannes Schneider as Mountain Guide

== Production ==
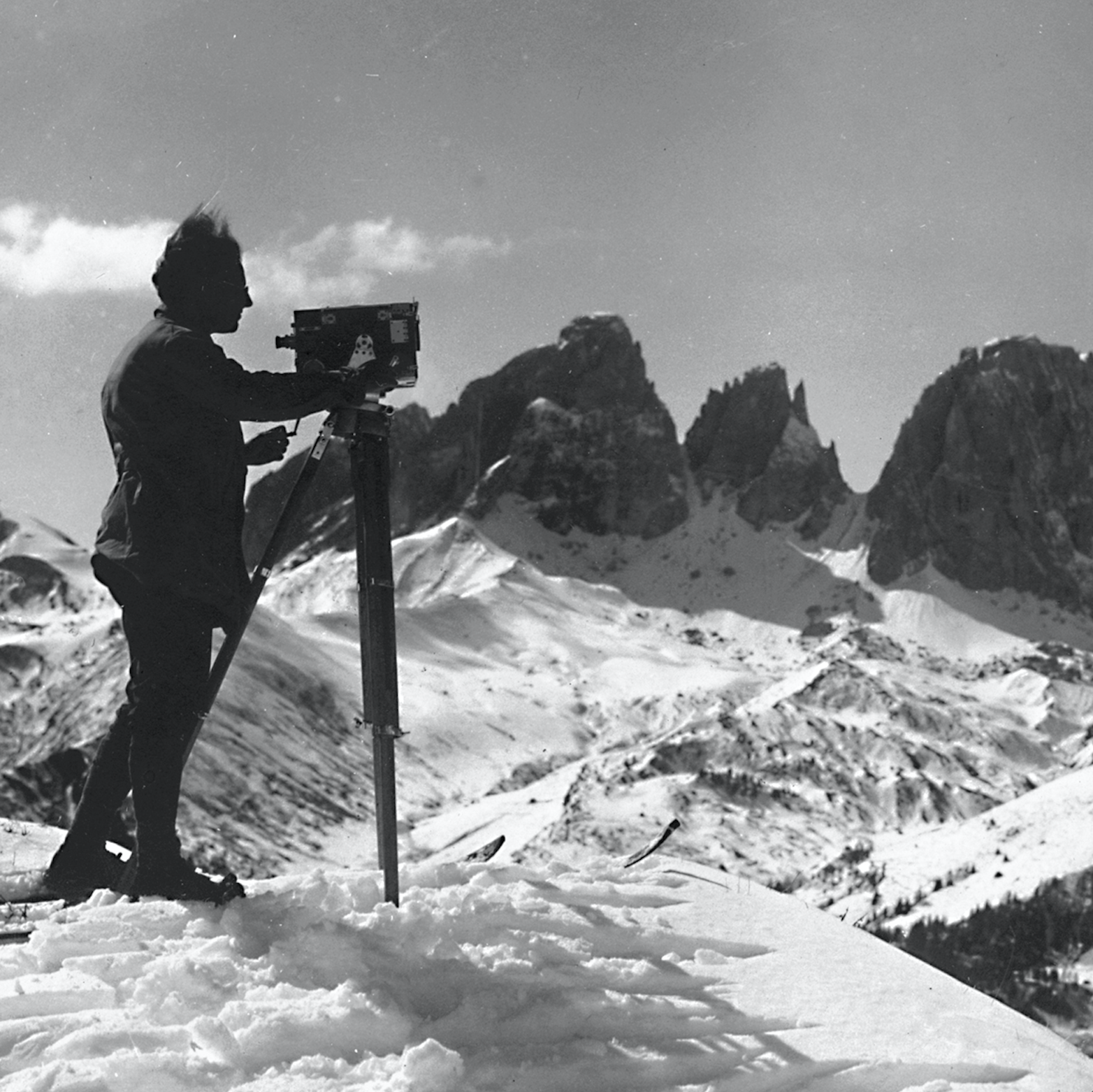
Arnold Fanck filming at Sellapass in the Dolomite Mountains

The film began production in January 1925, but then was delayed due to weather and hospitalization of three actors. The film cost 1.5 million reichsmark to produce, and was released during the 1926 Christmas season.

== Release and reception ==
Popular in Berlin, where sold-out performances extended its premiere run for five weeks, it was also screened in Britain, France and US: the first international success of its director. Some critics were not impressed with the film, one of the most expensive efforts released by the German studio UFA in a year which was otherwise marked by a policy of retrenchment and the departure of respected studio head Erich Pommer. The film was compared unfavourably with the much less costly Madame Wants No Children directed by Alexander Korda.

The Holy Mountain was released on DVD by Kino Video on 12 August 2003 and by Eureka Video on 21 June 2004. The film was re-released by Kino Video on 24 April 2018.
