= Arnold Fanck =

German film director

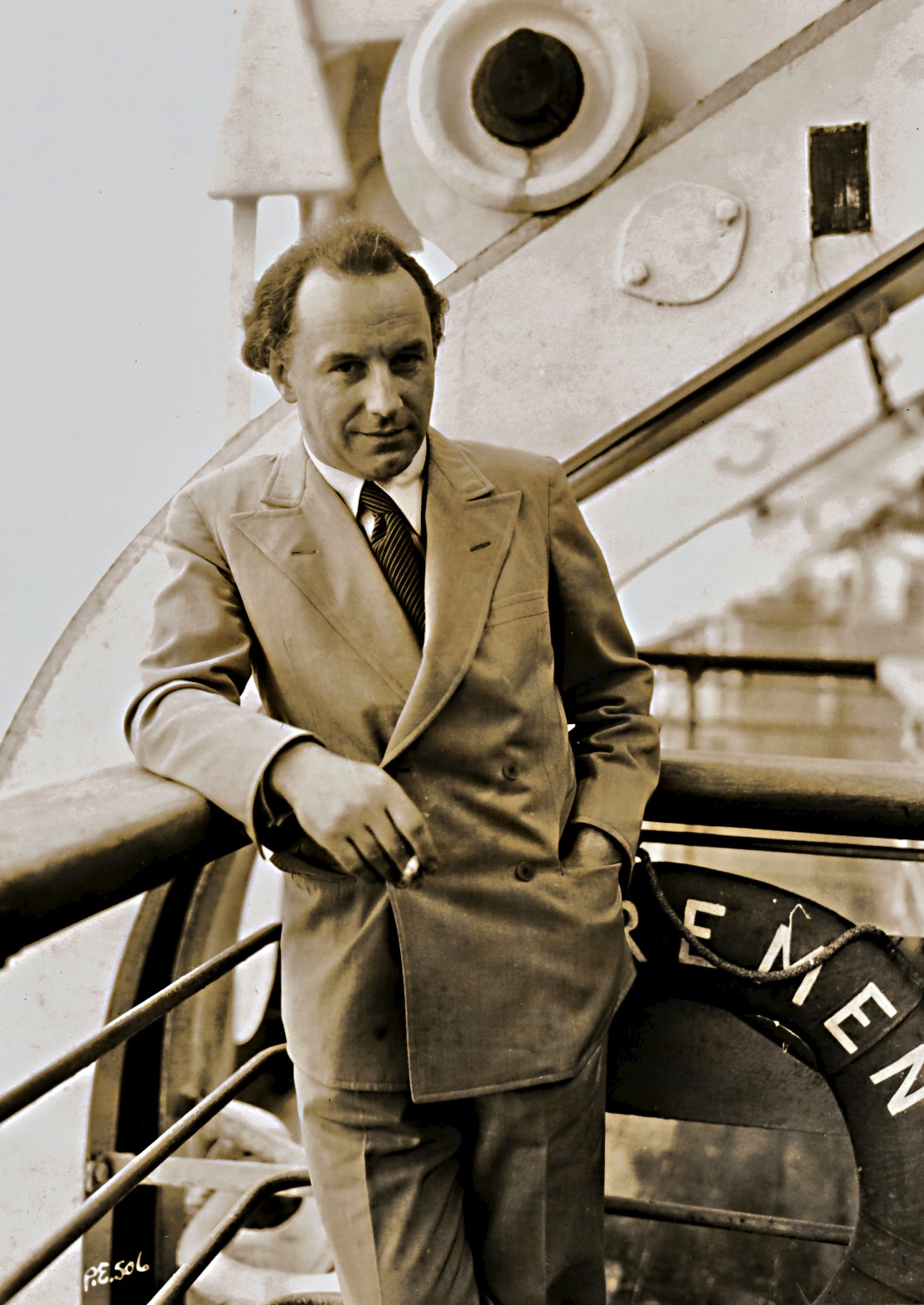
- Fanck in spring 1939 aboard the German liner SS Bremen
- Born: 6 March 1889; Frankenthal, Kingdom of Bavaria, German Empire
- Died: 28 September 1974 (aged 85); Freiburg im Breisgau, West Germany
- Education: University of Zürich
- Occupation: Film director
- Known for: Mountain films

Arnold Fanck (6 March 1889 – 28 September 1974) was a German film director and pioneer of the mountain film genre. He is best known for the extraordinary alpine footage he captured in such films as The Holy Mountain (1926), The White Hell of Pitz Palu (1929), Storm over Mont Blanc (1930), The White Ecstasy (1931), and S.O.S. Eisberg (1933). Fanck was also instrumental in launching the careers of several filmmakers during the Weimar years in Germany, including Leni Riefenstahl, Luis Trenker, and cinematographers Sepp Allgeier, Richard Angst, Hans Schneeberger, and Walter Riml.

== Biography ==
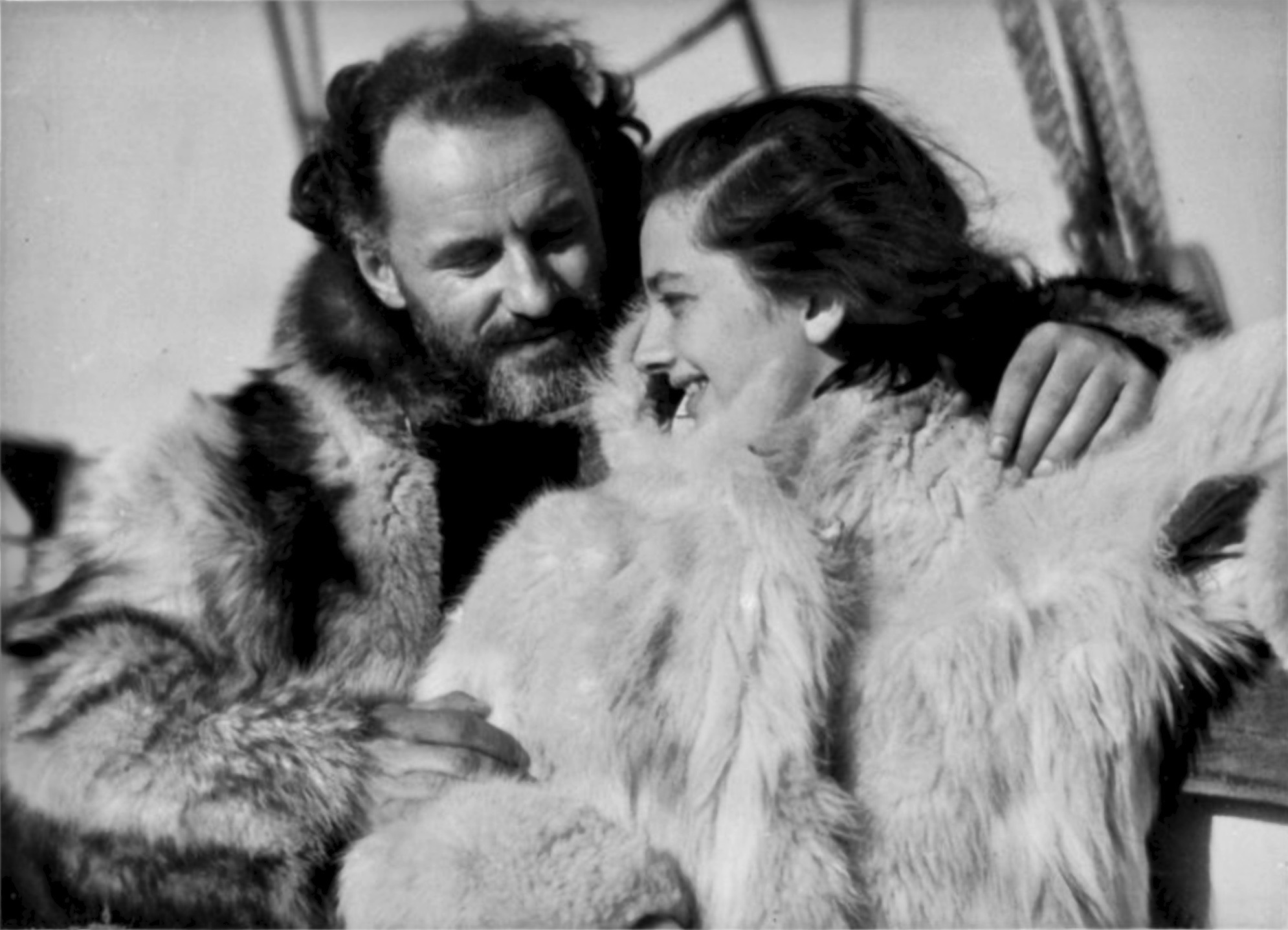
Arnold Fanck with his secretary and lover Elisabeth Kind 1933 in Greenland on set of the movie S.O.S. Eisberg. In 1934 both married in Berlin.

Arnold Fanck was born on 6 March 1889 in Frankenthal, Germany.

Together with Odo Deodatus Tauern, Bernhard Villinger and Rolf Bauer, Fanck established the company "Berg- und Sportfilm GmbH Freiburg" in Freiburg im Breisgau in 1920. Fanck, who held a PhD in geology, directed mountain films, sports films and ski films. He was assisted by Sepp Allgeier, a cameraman who later worked with Leni Riefenstahl, and worked mostly in the Alps in locations such as the Engadine, Zermatt and the Arlberg and on mountains such as Mont Blanc and Piz Palü.

His most popular and successful films of the period between the wars include The Holy Mountain (1926), The White Hell of Pitz Palu (1929), Storm over Mont Blanc (1930), The White Ecstasy (1931), and S.O.S. Eisberg (1933)—all starring Leni Riefenstahl.

During the Nazi regime, Fanck got in trouble with propaganda minister Joseph Goebbels, since he refused to cooperate — apparently because of the necessity of joining the party. In 1934, he also began working on his film, The Eternal Dream, which not only starred a French hero in French mountains, but also had a Jewish producer, Gregor Rabinovitch. This conflict brought Fanck economic difficulties from which he escaped only by accepting a contract from the Japanese ministry of culture in 1936.

With The Daughter of the Samurai and other "culture films," Fanck decided to cooperate with the Nazi regime. Soon afterward, he produced A German Robinson Crusoe (1938/40) a propaganda film for Bavaria Filmkunst. Fanck joined the NSDAP in April 1940.

In 1944 he made a documentary about the sculptor Arno Breker called Arno Breker – Harte Zeit, starke Kunst. After World War II, Fanck's main films made during the regime were proscribed by the Allied military governments. Fanck received no further job offers and went to work as a lumberjack.

After the screening of his film The Eternal Dream at the mountain film festival in Trento in 1957, Fanck was once again recognized for his artistic achievements. In order to survive his economic difficulties, however, he was forced to sell the rights to his films to a friend, until TV broadcasts improved his situation.

Fanck died on 28 September 1974 in Freiburg im Breisgau, Germany, at the age of 85. He is buried in the Hauptfriedhof in Freiburg.

== Filmography ==
- Das Wunder des Schneeschuhs (1920, documentary)
- Im Kampf mit dem Berge (1921)
- Das Wunder des Schneeschuhs, 2. Teil – Eine Fuchsjagd auf Skiern durchs Engadin (1922)
- Pömperlys Kampf mit dem Schneeschuh (co-director: Holger-Madsen, 1922)
- Mountain of Destiny (1924)
- Das Wolkenphänomen von Maloja (1924, short documentary)
- Die weiße Kunst (dir. Sepp Allgeier, 1925, documentary)
- The Holy Mountain (1926)
- The Great Leap (1927)
- Struggle for the Matterhorn (dir. Mario Bonnard and Nunzio Malasomma, 1928), co-wrote
- The White Stadium (1928, documentary)
- Milak, the Greenland Hunter (dir. Georg Asagaroff and Bernhard Villinger, 1928)
- The White Hell of Pitz Palu (co-director: G. W. Pabst, 1929)
- Storm over Mont Blanc (1930)
- The White Ecstasy (1931)
- S.O.S. Eisberg (1933)
- North Pole, Ahoy (dir. Andrew Marton, 1934)
- Die Seehunde (1934, short)
- The Eternal Dream (1934)
- The Daughter of the Samurai (1937)
- Winterreise durch Südmandschurien (1938, short documentary)
- Kaiserbauten in Fernost (1938, short documentary)
- Hänschen Klein (1938, short)
- A German Robinson Crusoe (1940)
- Kampf um den Berg (1941, short)
- Josef Thorak, Werkstatt und Werk (1943, short documentary)
- Arno Breker – Harte Zeit, starke Kunst (1944, short documentary)
- Atlantik-Wall (1944, short documentary)

== Retrospective films ==
- In Eis und Schnee – Der Filmregisseur Arnold Fanck (1997) directed by Hans-Jürgen Panitz
- Zwischen weißem Rausch und Abgrund: Über Arnold Fanck, den Extremregisseur (1998) directed by Andreas Berg
