= Hans Schneeberger =

Austrian cinematographer

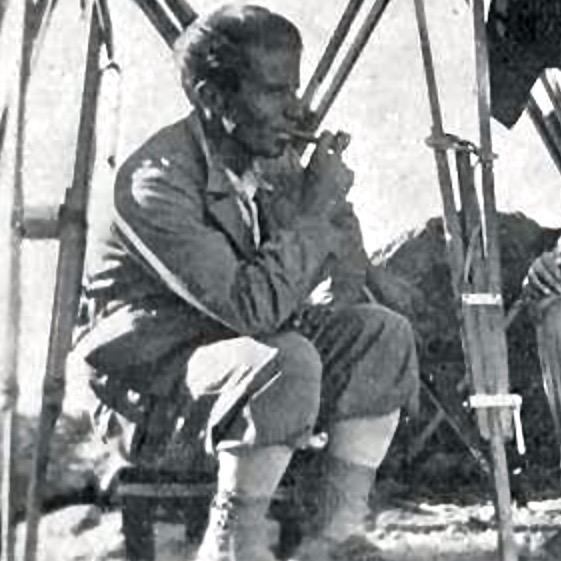
- Schneeberger filming Storm over Mont Blanc, 1929–30
- Born: 7 April 1895; Brandberg, Zillertal, Tyrol; Austro-Hungarian Empire
- Died: 19 November 1970 (aged 75); Salzburg; Austria
- Occupations: Cinematographer; Film actor
- Years active: 1924–1964 (film)

Hans Schneeberger (7 April 1895 – 19 November 1970) was an Austrian cinematographer who worked on over eighty films during his career. During the 1920s and early 1930s Schneeberger worked frequently with the director Arnold Fanck, including films starring Leni Riefenstahl. Schneeberger also made a handful of acting appearances, including playing opposite Riefenstahl in The Great Leap (1927). He filmed the famous final shot in The Third Man but was not credited. Schneeberger was later employed by the largest Austrian company Wien-Film for a number of productions.

== Selected filmography ==
=== Cinematographer ===
- The Holy Mountain (1926)
- Melody of the Heart (1929)
- The Wonderful Lies of Nina Petrovna (1929)
- The White Hell of Pitz Palu (1929)
- The Blue Light (1932)
- Adventures in the Engadin (1932)
- Miracle of Flight (1935)
- Conquest of the Air (1936)
- Forget Me Not (1936)
- Farewell Again (1937)
- The Tiger of Eschnapur (1938)
- The Indian Tomb (1938)
- Comrades at Sea (1938)
- Frau Sixta (1938)
- Fools in the Snow (1938)
- Target in the Clouds (1939)
- Linen from Ireland (1939)
- A Mother's Love (1939)
- Immortal Waltz (1939)
- Operetta (1940)
- Destiny (1942)
- Vienna 1910 (1943)
- Late Love (1943)
- The White Dream (1943)
- The Queen of the Landstrasse (1948)
- Mysterious Shadows (1949)
- The Fourth Commandment (1950)
- Cordula (1950)
- The Lie (1950)
- Jonny Saves Nebrador (1953)
- A Musical War of Love (1953)
- The Witch (1954)
- It Was Always So Nice With You (1954)
- Fruit Without Love (1956)
- Melody of the Heath (1956)
- The Elephant in a China Shop (1958)
- Mandolins and Moonlight (1959)
- William Tell (1960)
- Adieu, Lebewohl, Goodbye (1961)

== Bibliography ==
- Hinton, David B. The Films of Leni Riefenstahl. Scarecrow Press, 2000.
