= List of Austrian film actors =

This article lists notable Austrian actors.

Actors who were active in more than one era are listed only in that era in which they started their acting career.

== Silent film era (1906-1930) ==
Females:

- Sybille Binder
- Betty Bird
- Hedwig Bleibtreu
- Carmen Cartellieri
- Mady Christians
- Josefine Dora
- Tilla Durieux
- Olga Engl
- Anna Exl
- Maria Fein
- Nora Gregor
- Ilka Grünig
- Grit Haid
- Liane Haid
- Jenny Jugo
- Eva May
- Mia May
- Hansi Niese
- Ida Orloff
- Maria Reisenhofer
- Frida Richard
- Ellen Richter
- Magda Sonja
- Mathilde Sussin
- Maria Zelenka

Males:

- Wolf Albach-Retty
- Ernst Arndt
- Ludwig Auer
- Felix Basch
- Karl Baumgartner
- Teddy Bill
- Joseph Delmont
- Ernst Deutsch
- Gustav Diessl
- Anton Edthofer
- Karl Ehmann
- Ferdinand Exl
- Karl Farkas
- Friedrich Feher
- Willi Forst
- Rudolf Forster
- Alfons Fryland
- Jaro Fürth
- Alexander Girardi
- Alexander Granach
- Emmerich Hanus
- Heinz Hanus
- Karl Harbacher
- Franz Höbling
- Oskar Homolka
- Paul Hörbiger
- Fritz Imhoff
- Hans Jaray
- Oskar Karlweis
- Wilhelm Klitsch
- Fritz Kortner
- Fred Louis Lerch
- Hubert Marischka
- Hans Moser
- Eugen Neufeld
- Max Neufeld
- Alfred Neugebauer
- Georg Wilhelm Pabst
- Max Pallenberg
- Anton Pointner
- Paul Richter
- Eduard Rothauser
- Josef Schildkraut
- Rudolph Schildkraut
- Oskar Sima
- Walter Slezak
- Fritz Spira
- Magnus Stifter
- Ludwig Stössel
- Erich von Stroheim
- Igo Sym
- Hermann Thimig
- Otto Tressler
- Hans Unterkircher
- Anton Walbrook
- Eduard von Winterstein
- Friedrich Zelnik

== Early sound film era (1929-1959) ==
Females:

- Rosa Albach-Retty
- Senta Berger
- Vanessa Brown
- Friedl Czepa
- Elfriede Datzig
- Vilma Degischer
- Poldi Dur
- Edith Elmay
- Maria Emo
- Maria Eis
- Ilse Exl
- Adrienne Gessner
- Käthe Gold
- Anita Gutwell
- Waltraut Haas
- Marte Harell
- Heidemarie Hatheyer
- Angelika Hauff
- Judith Holzmeister
- Lizzi Holzschuh
- Christiane Hörbiger
- Gusti Huber
- Ulla Jacobsson
- Gertraud Jesserer
- Eva Kerbler
- Doris Kirchner
- Hansi Knoteck
- Hilde Krahl
- Ida Krottendorf
- Elfriede Kuzmany
- Hedy Lamarr
- Lotte Lang
- Susi Lanner
- Lotte Ledl
- Lotte Lenya
- Gerlinde Locker
- Sylvia Lopez
- Erni Mangold
- Christl Mardayn
- Trude Marlen
- Johanna Matz
- Gerda Maurus
- Elfie Mayerhofer
- Marisa Mell
- Edith Mill
- Susi Nicoletti
- Eva Pawlik
- Ina Peters
- Maria Perschy
- Erika Remberg
- Annie Rosar
- Angela Salloker
- Maria Schell
- Romy Schneider
- Marianne Schönauer
- Gretl Schörg
- Christine Schuberth
- Alma Seidler
- Traudl Stark
- Gretl Theimer
- Helene Thimig
- Jane Tilden
- Nadja Tiller
- Luise Ullrich
- Lizzi Waldmüller
- Senta Wengraf
- Paula Wessely
- Gusti Wolf
- Yetta Zwerling

Males:

- Peter Alexander
- Leon Askin
- John Banner
- Theodore Bikel
- Karlheinz Böhm
- Klaus Maria Brandauer
- Siegfried Breuer
- Heinz Conrads
- Theodor Danegger
- Helmut Dantine
- Ludwig Donath
- Joseph Egger
- Carl Esmond
- O. W. Fischer
- Karl Fochler
- Robert Freitag
- Erik Frey
- Leopold Hainisch
- Otto Hartmann
- Karl Hellmer
- Paul Henreid
- Hans Holt
- Attila Hörbiger
- Thomas Hörbiger
- Adrian Hoven
- Michael Janisch
- Curd Jürgens
- Alexander Kerst
- Eduard Köck
- Walter Kohut
- Friedrich von Ledebur
- Theo Lingen
- Eduard Linkers
- Helmuth Lohner
- Peter Lorre
- Paul Löwinger
- Ferdinand Marian
- Franz Marischka
- Josef Meinrad
- Kurt Meisel
- Fritz Muliar
- Reggie Nalder
- Rolf Olsen
- Karl Paryla
- Nikolaus Paryla
- Gunther Philipp
- Eric Pohlmann
- Rudolf Prack
- Helmut Qualtinger
- Freddy Quinn
- Fred Raul
- Raoul Retzer
- Walter Reyer
- Gregor von Rezzori
- Rudolf Rhomberg
- Gerhard Riedmann
- Richard Romanowsky
- Toni Sailer
- Maximilian Schell
- Otto Schenk
- Karl Schönböck
- Dietmar Schönherr
- Heinrich Schweiger
- Frederick Stafford
- Viktor Staal
- Erwin Strahl
- Otto Tausig
- Georg Tressler
- Alexander Trojan
- Friedrich von Ledebur
- Gregor von Rezzori
- Peter Weck
- Kurt Weinzierl
- John Wengraf
- Oskar Werner
- Rudolf Wessely
- Bernhard Wicki

== 1960s to 1980s ==
Females:

- Helga Anders
- Monica Bleibtreu
- Katharina Böhm
- Sybil Danning
- Mercedes Echerer
- Andrea Eckert
- Sonja Kirchberger
- Dagmar Koller
- Sissy Löwinger
- Marianne Mendt
- Christine Ostermayer
- Erika Pluhar
- Nina Proll
- Maria Rohm
- Eva Reuber-Staier
- Elisabeth Trissenaar
- Barbara Valentin

Males:

- Herb Andress,
- Wolf Bachofner
- Helmut Berger
- William Berger
- Wolfram Berger
- Klaus Maria Brandauer
- Jacques Breuer
- Alfons Haider
- Karlheinz Hackl
- Robert Hoffmann
- Udo Jürgens
- Fritz Karl
- Peter Kern
- Werner Kreindl
- Erwin Leder
- Paulus Manker
- Karl Merkatz
- Tobias Moretti
- Hans Georg Nenning
- Werner Pochath
- Hanno Pöschl
- Lukas Resetarits
- Sieghardt Rupp
- Walter Schmidinger
- August Schmölzer
- Arnold Schwarzenegger
- Oskar Werner
- August Zirner

== Since 1990s ==
Women:

- Natalie Alison
- Patricia Aulitzky
- Muriel Baumeister
- Pia Baresch
- Gabriela Benesch}
- Heidi Berger
- Nicole Beutler
- Eva Billisich
- Nina Blum
- Ruth Brauer-Kvam
- Katrin Butt
- Sandra Cervik
- Emily Cox
- Hemma Clementi
- Hilde Dalik
- Mavie Hörbiger
- Cindy Kurleto
- Larissa Marolt
- Birgit Minichmayr
- Marlene Morreis
- Zoë Straub
- Ursula Strauss
- Franziska Weisz

Men:

- Alfred Dorfer
- Arno Frisch
- Josef Hader
- Hansi Hinterseer
- Edgar Honetschläger
- Karl Markovics
- Thomas Mikusz
- Hans Georg Nenning
- Michael Niavarani
- Reinhard Nowak
- Michael Ostrowski
- Robert Stadlober
- Christoph Waltz

== See also ==
- Cinema of Austria
