= Exl =

Exl or EXL may refer to:

== People ==
- Anna Exl (1882–1969), Austrian actor
- Ferdinand Exl (1875–1942), Austrian actor
- Ilse Exl (1907–1956), Austrian actor

== Acronym ==
- Experiential Learning
- Extended Learning

== Other uses ==
- EXL Service, an American operations management and analytics company
- Sunshine Express Airlines, an Australian airline
