= The Rats (1921 film) =

1921 film

- Directed by: Hanns Kobe
- Written by: Gerhart Hauptmann (play); Julius Sternheim
- Produced by: Grete Ly
- Starring: Emil Jannings; Lucie Höflich; Eugen Klöpfer; Marija Leiko
- Cinematography: Karl Freund
- Production company: Grete Ly-Film
- Distributed by: Terra Film
- Release date: 29 July 1921
- Country: Germany
- Languages: Silent; German intertitles

The Rats (German: Die Ratten) is a 1921 German silent drama film directed by Hanns Kobe and starring Emil Jannings, Lucie Höflich, and Eugen Klöpfer. It is based on the 1911 play The Rats by Gerhart Hauptmann. It premiered in Berlin on 29 July 1921. The play was later adapted into a 1955 film.

The film's art direction was by Robert Neppach.

== Cast ==
- Emil Jannings as Bruno
- Lucie Höflich as Frau John
- Eugen Klöpfer as Herr John
- Marija Leiko as Pauline Piperkarcka
- Blandine Ebinger as Sidonie Knobbe
- Gertrude W. Hoffman
- Hermann Vallentin
- Hans Heinrich von Twardowski
- Max Kronert
- Kaethe Richter
- Preben J. Rist
- Claire Selo
- Emmy Wyda

== Bibliography ==
- Grange, William (2008). Cultural Chronicle of the Weimar Republic. Lanham, MD: Scarecrow Press. ISBN 978-0-8108-5967-8.
