= Heinz Moog =

German actor (1908–1989)

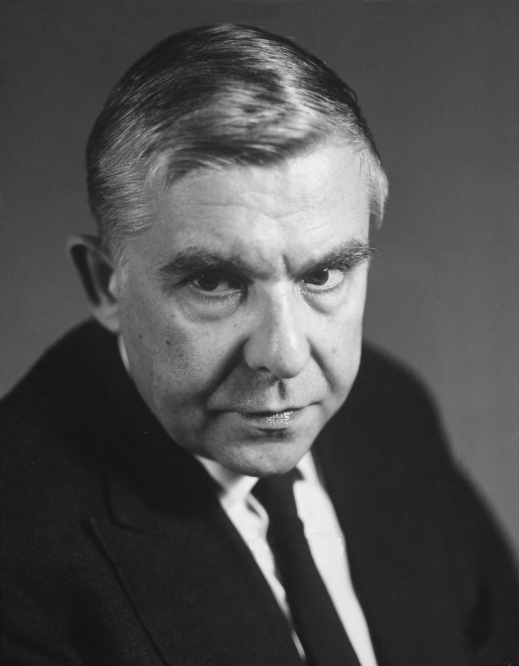
- Moog in 1959
- Born: 28 June 1908; Frankfurt, German Empire
- Died: 9 May 1989 (aged 80); Vienna, Austria
- Occupation: Actor
- Years active: 1943–1989

Gustav Heinrich Eduard Moog (28 June 1908 – 9 May 1989) was a German actor.

He has performed on numerous renowned German and Austrian stages and was a member of the ensemble at the Burgtheater in Vienna for many years. He appeared in more than seventy films from 1943 to 1989.

== Filmography ==
| Year | Title | Role | Notes |
|---|---|---|---|
| 1943 | Laugh Bajazzo | Leoncavallo | |
| 1944 | Der gebieterische Ruf | Dozent Janowski | |
| 1945 | Shiva und die Galgenblume | | unfinished film |
| 1945 | Der Fall Molander | | |
| 1947 | Die Welt dreht sich verkehrt | | |
| 1948 | The Trial | Baron Onody | |
| 1949 | Duel with Death | | |
| 1950 | Romanzo d'amore | Ministre de police | |
| 1951 | Call Over the Air | Wartanian | |
| 1951 | The Magic Face | Hans Harbach | |
| 1951 | Without a Flag | Baron von Loetzendorff | |
| 1952 | Wienerinnen | | |
| 1952 | Vanished Melody | Director Gayer | |
| 1952 | Deceit | Rassuna, complice della baronessa | |
| 1952 | 1. April 2000 | Hajji Halef Omar | |
| 1953 | The Spendthrift | Wolf, Kammerdiener | |
| 1954 | Senso | Il conte Serpieri | |
| 1955 | Espionage | Baron Letten | |
| 1955 | Götz von Berlichingen | | |
| 1956 | Sinfonia d'amore | Count Esterhazy | |
| 1958 | Solang' die Sterne glüh'n | Schimmelpfennig, Chefredakteur | |
| 1958 | Sebastian Kneipp | Prof. v. Ziemssen | |
| 1959 | Arena of Fear | Direktor Larzheim | |
| 1959 | Maria Stuart | | |
| 1961 | The Secret Ways | Minister Ferenc Sakenov | |
| 1964 | Der Verschwender | Wolf, sein Kammerdienter | |
| 1969 | Der Tod vom Sokrates | Socrates | |
| 1971 | Und Jimmy ging zum Regenbogen | Hofrat Groll | |
| 1973 | Ludwig | Professor Von Gudden | |
| 1974 | Karl May | Dr. Gerlach | |
| 1976 | The Wild Duck | Konsul Werle | |
| 1982 | Wir | Wohltäter | TV movie |
| 1983 | Tramps | Josef Luft | |
| 1984 | Tiger: Springtime in Vienna | | |
| 1987 | Mahuliena, Golden Maiden | Král | |
