= Vojka =

Vojka may refer to:

- Vojka, Serbia, village in the municipality of Stara Pazova, Vojvodina, Serbia
- Vojka, Slovakia, village and municipality in the Trebišov District, Slovakia
- Vojka nad Dunajom, village and municipality in the Dunajská Streda District, Slovakia
