= The Blue Light (1932 film) =

1932 film

- Directed by: Leni Riefenstahl
- Screenplay by: Béla Balázs (uncredited); Carl Mayer (uncredited)
- Story by: Leni Riefenstahl
- Based on: Bergkristall by Gustav Renker (uncredited)
- Produced by: Leni Riefenstahl; Harry R. Sokal
- Starring: Leni Riefenstahl; Beni Führer; Max Holzboer; Mathias Wieman; Franz Maldacea
- Cinematography: Hans Schneeberger; Walter Riml
- Edited by: Leni Riefenstahl
- Music by: Dr. Giuseppe Becce
- Release dates: 24 March 1932 (Berlin); 8 May 1934 (USA)
- Running time: 86 minutes
- Country: Germany
- Languages: German; Italian

The Blue Light (German: Das blaue Licht) is a black-and-white 1932 film directed by Leni Riefenstahl and written by Béla Balázs with uncredited scripting by Carl Mayer. In Riefenstahl's film version, the witch, Junta, played by Riefenstahl, is intended to be a sympathetic character. Filming took place in the Brenta Dolomites, in Ticino, Switzerland, and Sarntal, South Tirol.

== Plot ==
The Blue Light is a frame story with a fairy tale atmosphere and mystical elements. A modern couple arrive in a convertible automobile at an inn in Santa Maria, a mountain village. Upon seeing an intriguing, cameo-style photo of a woman, they ask the innkeeper who she is. The innkeeper asks a young boy to bring the book containing "Junta's story," and the movie unfolds as the innkeeper opens a very large book to its title page.

Junta is a young woman who lives, at the turn of the century, apart from her fellow villagers. Junta lives largely in solitude (except for the company of Guzzi, a young shepherd boy) in the tranquility of the mountains surrounding the village. She plays in the hills and woodlands, as a naive, free spirit. She is simple and innocent, but also seems something of a mystic. She loves to clamber over the steep, difficult terrain of the local mountains. Due to her feral strangeness, she is considered to be a witch. When she comes to town for one reason or another, the townsfolk chase her away.

They feel that she must in some way be responsible for the ongoing deaths of the young men of the village. This is because Junta is able to climb the local mountain unscathed, while these young men continue to fall to their deaths attempting to climb it under supernatural circumstances. On full moon nights, a crack in a prominent local mountain admits the Moon's light and illuminates a grotto filled with beautiful crystals. This place of indescribable beauty, radiating the film's titular "blaue Licht" (blue light), is a sacred space for Junta. The crystals' luminous glow casts a spell on the village's young men, who, one by one, in a state of hypnotic attraction, attempt and fail to reach its source, falling to their deaths.

Vigo, a painter from the city, travels to Santa Maria in a horse-drawn coach. Upon seeing Junta being harassed in the village square, he falls in love with her. Later, after saving her from the villagers after another young man's death, Vigo follows Junta to the cabin she shares with Guzzi, and decides to stay. Vigo speaks only German, and Junta only Italian, so their communication is limited. All is pleasant, good and very chaste until the next full moon night, when Vigo sees Junta climbing the mountain. He himself, mesmerized by the blue light, follows her, actually reaching the grotto, where he finds her in a state of ecstasy among the crystals.

Thinking he will help Junta by providing her with material wealth, and perceiving the lode of crystals to be a potential source of wealth for both her and the villagers, Vigo immediately rushes down to inform the townsfolk, also telling them how to safely reach the grotto. Junta does not realize that he is doing this until the next day, when she finds some of her crystals on the path to the village, along with some dropped tools. Rushing up to the grotto, she finds it completely barren of crystals: all have been taken by the greedy villagers. Meanwhile, the villagers and Vigo are celebrating. Junta is totally devastated at this violation of the sacred grotto and of her trust in the outsider, and falls to her death. Vigo finds her among the montane flowers (the mountain cornflower, or bluets), and grieves.

The film then closes, returning to the opening, modern-day scene, with a shot of what is presumably the last page of the book, in which Junta is exonerated and her memory celebrated.

== Cast ==
- Leni Riefenstahl as Junta
- Mathias Wieman as Vigo
- Beni Führer as Tonio
- Max Holzboer as Innkeeper
- Martha Mair as Lucia
- Franz Maldacea as Guzzi

== Production ==
Leni Riefenstahl's directorial debut, The Blue Light was written by Béla Balázs. However, as Balázs was Jewish, Riefenstahl was credited as the writer in re-releases following Hitler's ascent to power.

In the documentary The Wonderful, Horrible Life of Leni Riefenstahl (1993), Riefenstahl relates that the Agfa Film Corporation gave her a new film stock called R-Stock. When filming was done through a red filter the sky would appear absolutely black, achieving day-for-night. The film was among the first sound films to be filmed entirely on location.

Arnold Fanck, who had directed several mountain films featuring Riefenstahl, did a first edit of the film, which Riefenstahl found unacceptable, and she completely re-edited the film. While the original edit needed work, Riefenstahl's production of the film was ahead of her time. According to Reel Women: Pioneers of the Cinema, 1896 to the Present Riefenstahl was questioned on her techniques such as combining different filters to create the famous blue light within the film.

=== Possible inspirations ===
A similarly named legend in Germany (Das blaue Licht) may have lent some inspiration to the screenplay. During a time when a pan-Germanic ethos was sweeping the country, audiences were highly likely to have been familiar with the old legend, and accordingly expected the film to follow it closely. However, the film shares very little with the legend, even departing from it in an unexpected way, casting Riefenstahl as the beautiful loner, not at all a witch, but falsely accused.

The original legend, compiled by the Brothers Grimm in 1810, and later popularized by the German nationalists of the 1920s, tells the story of a crippled soldier who is terminated from the service of his king. Released from service, he travels into the woods to seek a cure, and comes upon a witch's house. It is there that he asks her if she is willing to help him. She agrees to cure him but he must first do three things for her. (The third task being nothing less than to descend into a very deep and dry well, and bring back from its depths a magic lamp.)

In that legend, however, the soldier finds a dwarflike creature at the bottom of the well. Apart from the strange lamp he comes upon, which glows in a mysteriously blue light (and which ultimately leads to the witch's ruin), there is very little else to connect Riefenstahl's concept to the German myth that came before her.

Gustav Renker's 1930 novel Bergkristall ('Mountain crystal') has many similarities to the plot of Das blaue Licht and may have been used by Balázs without attribution.

== Release ==
A 1937 re-release in Nazi Germany removed Mayer, Balázs, and Sokal's names due to the regime's antisemitic policies, as all three were Jewish. It's often suggested that this was done by Riefenstahl's request.

An edited version was released in 1951, funded by Italian corporations. It was truncated from 86 to 73 minutes, removing the arrival scene of modern urbanites in Santa Maria. The film was marketed as "A Mountain Legend by Leni Riefenstahl". In November 1951, the film premiered with a new edit, score and soundtrack in Rome at a gala screening that Riefenstahl described as "dazzling". This restoration was theatrically released in German cinemas and received a limited release in Austria under the title The Witch of Santa Maria (Die Hexe von Santa Maria).

== Reception ==
The film was a moderate commercial and critical success. It performed well in much of Europe and Great Britain, although some critics were divided, particularly in Germany. Several left wing news publications derided the effort, while it was applauded by the right wing press. The film enjoyed considerable commercial and critical success in London and Paris, where Alpine cinema was a novelty. It was screened in competition at the 1932 Venice Film Festival. It was also named one of the year's top five foreign films at the 1934 National Board of Review Awards.

The New York Sun described the film as "one of the most pictorially beautiful films of the year. Leni Riefenstahl – author, director and star – is an expert climber as well as handsome woman."

The New York Herald Tribune praised the "sheer pictorial beauty", the publication also praised Riefenstahl remarking "how flawlessly this girl, who plays the lead and also wrote and directed, accomplished her task."

The New York Times remarked that "a summary of the story gives no adequate idea of the beauty of the action and the remarkable camera work, especially in connection with the light effects."

The film's aesthetic, particularly the depiction of nature, is also said to have caught the attention of Adolf Hitler, and possibly contributed to his later decision to commission Riefenstahl to make propaganda films for him.

On the review aggregator website Rotten Tomatoes, 70% of 10 critics' reviews are positive.

== Unmade remake ==
In 1960, Riefenstahl collaborated with L. Ron Hubbard on a screenplay for a remake of The Blue Light, but it was never produced.

== See also ==
- List of German films of 1919–1932

== Works cited ==
- Waldman, Harry (2008). Nazi Films In America, 1933–1942. McFarland & Company. ISBN 9780786438617.
