= The Lost Valley =

1934 film

- Directed by: Edmund Heuberger
- Written by: Edmund Heuberger
- Based on: The Lost Valley by Gustav Renker
- Produced by: Ralph Scotoni
- Starring: Mathias Wieman; Marieluise Claudius; Harry Hardt
- Cinematography: Franz Weihmayr
- Edited by: Else Baum
- Music by: Fritz Wenneis
- Production companies: Terra Film; Basilea-Film
- Distributed by: Terra Film
- Release date: 5 June 1934
- Running time: 102 minutes
- Country: Germany
- Language: German

The Lost Valley (German: Das verlorene Tal) is a 1934 German-Swiss drama film directed by Edmund Heuberger and starring Mathias Wieman, Marieluise Claudius and Harry Hardt. It is based on the 1931 novel of the same title by Gustav Renker. The film's sets were designed by the art director Hans Jacoby. Location shooting took place around Poschiavo in Switzerland.

== Synopsis ==
A young man returns to his home village and discovers that his childhood sweetheart is now engaged to a civil engineer who also plans to flood his beloved woods to create a reservoir.

== Cast ==
- Mathias Wieman as René von Eisten
- Marieluise Claudius as Verena Stettler
- Harry Hardt as Hans Alteggen
- Olaf Bach as Josi
- Lilliane Dietz as Yvonne d'Ivry
- Lotte Spira as Giovanna Stettler
- Wera Liessem as Lisa Amann
- Armin Schweizer as Blunzli
- Ferdinand Asper as Morgenthaler
- Armand Zäpfel as Rudi Boss

== Bibliography ==
- Goble, Alan. The Complete Index to Literary Sources in Film. Walter de Gruyter, 1999.
- Waldman, Harry. Nazi Films in America, 1933-1942. McFarland, 2008.
