= Another World (1937 film) =

1937 film

- Directed by: Marc Allégret; Alfred Stöger
- Written by: Francis de Croisset (novel); Emil Burri
- Produced by: Herbert Engelsing
- Starring: Käthe Gold; Karl Ludwig Diehl; Franz Schafheitlin
- Cinematography: Jules Kruger
- Music by: Louis Beydts
- Production company: Regina Film
- Distributed by: Tobis Film
- Release date: 5 November 1937
- Running time: 93 minutes
- Countries: France; Germany
- Language: German

Another World (German: Andere Welt) is a 1937 French-German drama film directed by Marc Allégret and Alfred Stöger and starring Käthe Gold, Karl Ludwig Diehl and Franz Schafheitlin. Shot at the Epinay Studios of Tobis Film in Paris, the film is the German-language version of Woman of Malacca. The film's sets were designed by the art directors Jacques Krauss and Alexandre Trauner.

== Synopsis ==
To escape her dreary life as a teacher, a young woman marries a British medical officer, who takes her to Malacca. The couple's disagreement increases and the young woman falls in love with a Malay prince.

== Cast ==
- Käthe Gold as Audrey
- Karl Ludwig Diehl as Prinz Selim
- Franz Schafheitlin as Dr. Herbert Carter
- Herbert Hübner as Lord Brandmore
- Leopoldine Konstantin as Lady Brandmore
- Annemarie Steinsieck as Lady Lyndstone
- Karl Günther
- Alexander Engel as Dr. Jerrys, Arzt
- Karl Meixner as Li, Carters Diener
- Herbert Spalke as Sirdar, Adjutant Selims
- Margarete Kupfer as Mme. Turpin
- Maria Krahn as Mme. Tramon
- Melanie Horeschowsky as Mme. Tremons Schwester
- Andrews Engelmann as Ein Fremder
- F.W. Schröder-Schrom as 1. Journalist
- Kurt Meisel as 2. Journalist
- Jim Simmons as Kapitän Gerald Smith
- Ilka Thimm as Journalistin
- Richard Ludwig as Kapitän
- Erwin van Roy as Bordkommissar

== Bibliography ==
- Passerini, Luisa; Labanyi, Jo; Diehl, Karen, eds. (2012). Europe and Love in Cinema. Chicago: Intellect Books. ISBN 978-1-84150-672-2.
- Rentschler, Eric (1996). The Ministry of Illusion: Nazi Cinema and Its Afterlife. Cambridge, Mass: Harvard University Press. ISBN 978-0-674-57640-7.
