= Mimi Gstöttner-Auer =

Austrian actress

- Born: 7 April 1886; Innsbruck, Austro-Hungarian Empire
- Died: 11 November 1977 (aged 91)
- Other name: Maria Gstöttner
- Occupation: Actress
- Years active: 1937-1948 (film)

Mimi Gstöttner-Auer (1886–1977) was an Austrian stage and film actress. She was the younger sister of Anna Exl and the aunt of Ilse Exl. She was married to the actor Ernst Auer.

On the stage she was generally known for her comedic roles, in contrast to her sister who played tragic characters.

== Selected filmography ==
- The Vulture Wally (1940)
- Ulli and Marei (1948)

== Bibliography ==
- Gretl Köfler & Michael Forcher. Die Frau in der Geschichte Tirols. Haymon, 1986.
