= Mahulena =

Mahulena (pronounced mah-huw-leh-nah) is a female given name of Czech origin. The Slovak variant is Mahuliena (pronounced mah-huw-LI-ye-nah). The name days are 17 November (Czech) and 22 July (Slovak).

Mahulena may also refer to:

- Mahulena Bočanová, Czech actress
- Mahulena Nešlehová, Czech painter's theorist and curator
- Mahulena Richterová, doctor of medicine

== Fictional works ==
- Mahuliena, Golden Maiden, Slovak-German fairy-tale from 1986
- Radúz and Mahulena, the dramatic poem by Julius Zeyer

== See also ==
- List of articles beginning with "Mahulena"
