= Laugh Bajazzo (1943 film) =

1943 film

- Directed by: Leopold Hainisch
- Written by: Harald Bratt
- Starring: Paul Hörbiger; Claude Farell; Dagny Servaes
- Cinematography: Erich Nitzschmann; Fritz Arno Wagner
- Edited by: Ella Ensink
- Music by: Willy Schmidt-Gentner
- Production company: Tobis Film
- Distributed by: Deutsche Filmvertriebs
- Release date: 28 May 1943
- Running time: 87 minutes
- Country: Germany
- Language: German

Laugh, Bajazzo (German: Lache Bajazzo) is a 1943 German drama film directed by Leopold Hainisch and starring Paul Hörbiger, Claude Farell and Dagny Servaes. A separate Italian-language version Laugh, Pagliacci was also produced. The film's sets were designed by the art director Franz Koehn and Hans Kuhnert.

== Cast ==
- Paul Hörbiger as Canio
- Claude Farell as Giulia
- Dagny Servaes as Frau Valmondi
- Beniamino Gigli as Morelli
- Karl Martell as Leutnant Graf Lanzoni
- Gustav Waldau as Cesare Lanzoni
- Peter Voß as Claudio Lanzoni
- Heinz Moog as Leoncavallo
- Lucie Höflich as Emilia
- Erich Fiedler as Gregorio
- Werner Pledath as Operndirektor
- Franz Weber as Kunstsachverständiger
- Klaus Pohl as Mäzen
- Ernst Legal as Alter Verbrecher
- Louis Ralph as Alter Gauner
- Karl Hellmer as Gärtner
- Angelo Ferrari as Silvio

== Bibliography ==
- Bock, Hans-Michael & Bergfelder, Tim. The Concise Cinegraph: Encyclopaedia of German Cinema. Berghahn Books, 2009.
- Klaus, Ulrich J. Deutsche Tonfilme: Jahrgang 1942. Klaus-Archiv, 1988.
