= Christiane Hörbiger =

Austrian television and film actress (1938–2022)

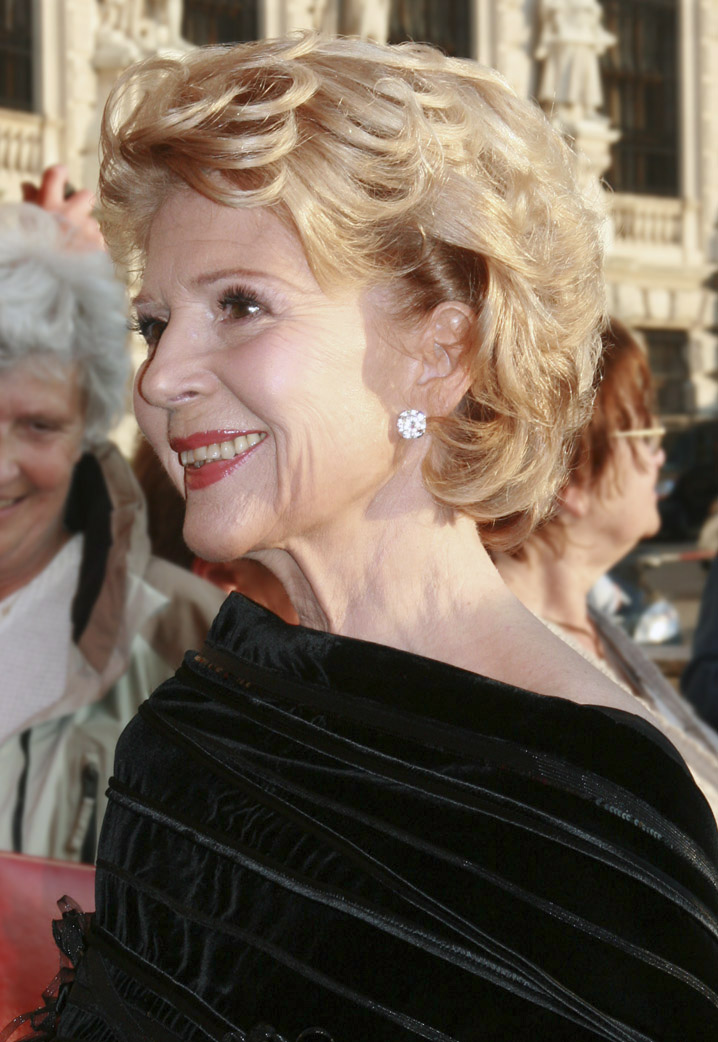
- Hörbiger in 2009
- Born: 13 October 1938; Vienna, Austria, Nazi Germany
- Died: 30 November 2022 (aged 84); Vienna, Austria
- Occupation: Actress
- Parents: Attila Hörbiger (father); Paula Wessely (mother)
- Relatives: Christian Tramitz (nephew); Paul Hörbiger (paternal uncle)

Christiane Hörbiger (13 October 1938 – 30 November 2022) was an Austrian stage, film, and television actress. Her first major film role was Mary Vetsera in Kronprinz Rudolfs letzte Liebe in 1955. She appeared on the stage of the Burgtheater as Recha in Lessing's Nathan der Weise in 1959, became a member of Theater Heidelberg and later Schauspielhaus Zürich. From 1969 to 1972, she portrayed Die Buhlschaft in Hofmannsthal's Jedermann at the Salzburg Festival.

She is remembered for roles of strong, self-conscious women who defy adverse circumstances, as television series began to present from the mid-1980s, including Countess Christine von Guldenburg in the series Das Erbe der Guldenburgs from 1987 to 1990, and the title role of the Austrian television series Julia – Eine ungewöhnliche Frau from 1999 to 2004. She became a favourite with audiences and received international awards.

== Life and career ==
Born in Vienna on 13 October 1938, Hörbiger was the second of the three actress daughters of Austrian actors Attila Hörbiger (1896–1987) and Paula Wessely (1907–2000). Her sisters were Elisabeth Orth and Maresa Hörbiger. She was the aunt of German actor Christian Tramitz.

As her mother wished, she first trained to be a pastry maker (Zuckerbäcker), and her parents bought her a Konditorei. She decided in 1955 to pursue an acting career, and attended the Max Reinhardt Seminar, but dropped out the same year to play Mary Vetsera in the film Kronprinz Rudolfs letzte Liebe. She first appeared at the Burgtheater in Vienna as Recha in Lessing's Nathan der Weise in 1959, but reviews were scathing. She moved to the Theater Heidelberg for two years. She played at the Salzburg Festival, together with her mother for the first time, as Lottchen in Raimund's Der Bauer als Millionär in 1961. When she returned to the Burgtheater, again as Recha, she was successful.

From 1967 to 1985, Hörbiger was a member of the Schauspielhaus Zürich. She appeared there in classical roles such as Elisabeth in Schiller's Maria Stuart and roles by Shakespeare and Chechov, also roles in the Vienna tradition such as Nestroy, Schnitzler and Hofmannsthal, and contemporary theatre. From 1969 to 1972, she portrayed Die Buhlschaft in Hofmannsthal's Jedermann at the Salzburg Festival, with Ernst Schröder in the title role.

Hörbiger played roles in various German and Austrian television films and series, beginning in the mid-1980s playing the lead role of Countess Christine von Guldenburgin in the series Das Erbe der Guldenburgs, alongside Brigitte Horney, Ruth Maria Kubitschek, and Stewart Granger. From 1999 to 2004 she played the title character in the Austrian series Julia – Eine ungewöhnliche Frau (Julia – An Extraordinary Woman). In film, she was successful as Freya von Hepp in Helmut Dietl's 1992 satire Schtonk! about forged Hitler diaries, as well as in Tafelspitz, Lamorte (1997) and Hunger. She portrayed the revengeful Claire Zachanassian in Nikolaus Leytner's 2008 television film based on Dürrenmatt's Der Besuch der alten Dame. Her son, Sascha Bigler, directed the drama film Meine Schwester in 2011, where she appeared alongside her sister Maresa for the first time. He also directed one of her last works, the 2018 detective film Die Muse des Mörders.

In 1995 she was a member of the jury at the 45th Berlin International Film Festival. Hörbiger's only foray into voice acting was the role of Mrs Calloway (the dairy cow) in the German-language version of Disney's Home on the Range.

=== Personal life ===
Hörbiger was married to director Wolfgang Glück. Her second husband was the Swiss journalist Rolf R. Bigler; they had a son, Sascha. After Bigler's death in 1978, Gerhard Tötschinger, a director and author, became her partner; he died in 2016. Hörbiger lived mainly in Vienna. She was a UNICEF ambassador, and was committed to cancer aid.

Hörbiger died in Vienna on 30 November 2022 at age 84. She is survived by her son Sascha Bigler and grandson Lucas.

== Selected filmography ==
Films with Hörbiger have included:

- The Major and the Bulls (Der Major und die Stiere, 1955), as Marie
- Der Bauer als Millionär (1961), as Lottchen, on stage of the Salzburg Festival with her mother
- Don't Get Angry (Mensch ärgere dich nicht, 1972), as Frl. Glöckner
- Donauwalzer (1984, TV film), as Judith Lichtenberg
- Das Erbe der Guldenburgs (1987–1990, TV series, 41 episodes), as Countess Christine von Guldenburg
- Herr Ober! (1961), as Frau Held
- Schtonk! (1992), as Freya von Hepp
- Back to Square One (Alles auf Anfang, 1993), as Lore Kuballa
- I Desire You (Ich begehre dich, 1995, TV film), as Alexandra Meyberg
- Alte Liebe – Neues Glück (1996, TV film), as Marianne Mühlhuber — (Remake of Der Hofrat Geiger and Mariandl)
- Lamorte (1997, TV film), as Mona
- Julia – Eine ungewöhnliche Frau (1999–2004, TV series, 65 episodes), as Judge Julia Laubach
- Die Gottesanbeterin (2001), as Trixi Jancik
- Home on the Range (2004), as Mrs. Calloway
- The Visit (2008, TV film), as Claire Zachanassian — (based on Dürrenmatt's play)
- Meine Schwester (2011), as Katharina
- Grandma Rules (2012, TV film), as Henriette Dietrichstein
- The Long Wave After the Keel (2012, TV film), as Margarete Kämmerer — (based on a novel by Pavel Kohout)
- Little Lady (2012, TV film), as The Countess — (based on Little Lord Fauntleroy)
- Schon wieder Henriette (2013), as Henriette Dietrichstein
- Die Muse des Mörders (2018), as Madeleine Montana

== Awards ==
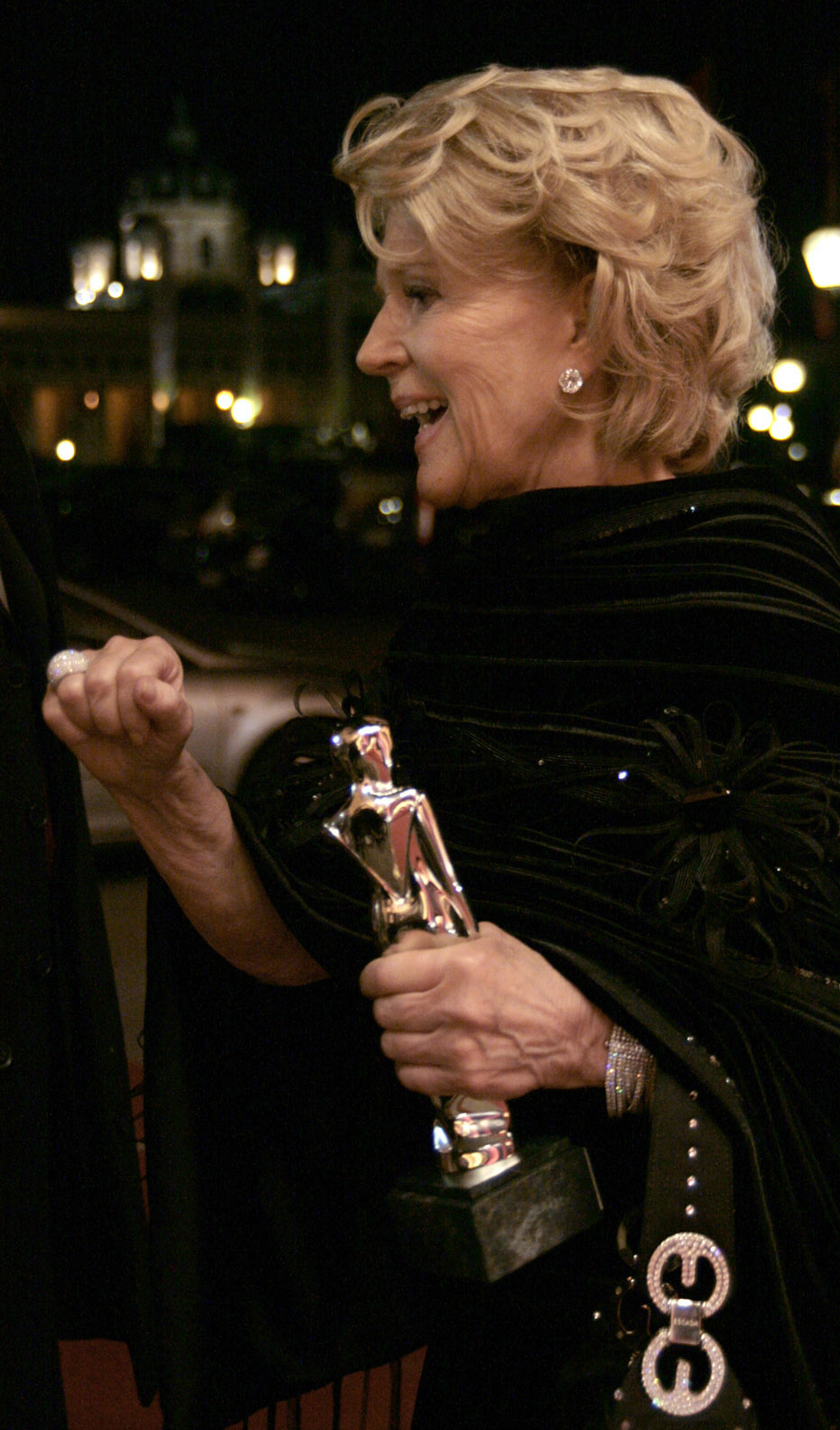
Hörbiger receiving the Romy award in 2009

Hörbiger received numerous awards for her acting, including:

- 1985: Bayerischer Filmpreis, Best Actress
- 1988: Goldene Kamera
- 1992: Romy as the most popular actress
- 1992: Bambi
- 1994: German Film Awards
- 1998: Austrian Cross of Honour for Science and Art, 1st class
- 1999: Golden Medal of Honour for Services to the City of Vienna
- 2001: Adolf Grimme Award for Outstanding Individual Achievement in Julia – eine außergewöhnliche Frau
- 2001: Merit Cross of the Federal Republic of Germany
- 2002: Karl Valentin Order
- 2002: Ernst-Lubitsch-Preis
- 2004: Kammerschauspielerin
- 2008: Deutscher Vorlesepreis with the "Reading Tools" award for her merits as an audiobook spokeswoman
- 2009: Platinum Romy
- 2009: Bavarian Television Award – Special Award
- 2009: Gold Medal of the capital Vienna
