= The Valley of Love (1935 film) =

1935 film directed by Hans Steinhoff

- Directed by: Hans Steinhoff
- Written by: Axel Eggebrecht; Ernst Hasselbach; Erich Kröhnke
- Based on: Das Tal des Lebens by Max Dreyer
- Produced by: Karl Julius Fritzsche
- Starring: Käthe Gold; Richard Romanowsky; Marieluise Claudius
- Cinematography: Rudolf Bredtschneider; Willy Gerlach; Karl Puth
- Edited by: Alice Ludwig
- Music by: Franz Grothe
- Production company: Centropa-Film
- Distributed by: Europa Film; Tobis-Sascha (Austria)
- Release date: 5 December 1935
- Running time: 103 minutes
- Country: Germany
- Language: German

The Valley of Love (German: Das Tal der Liebe or Der Ammenkönig) is a 1935 German comedy film directed by Hans Steinhoff and starring Käthe Gold, Richard Romanowsky and Marieluise Claudius. It was shot at the Johannisthal Studios of Tobis Film in Berlin. The film's sets were designed by the art director Franz Schroedter. It is based on the 1902 farce Das Tal des Lebens by Max Dreyer. It was given a fresh release in 1950 by Deutsche London Film.

== Cast ==
- Käthe Gold as Die Marktgräfin
- Richard Romanowsky as Der Marktgraf
- Gustav Knuth as Hans Stork
- Marieluise Claudius as Lisbeth
- Erika von Thellmann as Prinzessin Mathilde, die Schwester des Marktgrafen
- Fita Benkhoff as Theres
- Theo Lingen as Der Keuschheitskommissar
- Georg H. Schnell as Herr von Geldern
- Erhard Siedel as Flitzinger
- Rudolf Klein-Rogge as Herr von Roden
- Ernst Behmer as Leibdiener Pfeffermann
- Gerhard Dammann as Wachtmeister Schlippenbach
- Flockina von Platen as Frau von Prillwitz, Hofdame
- Friedrich Ettel as Sass

== Bibliography ==
- Bock, Hans-Michael & Bergfelder, Tim. The Concise Cinegraph: Encyclopaedia of German Cinema. Berghahn Books, 2009.
- Giesen, Rolf. The Nosferatu Story: The Seminal Horror Film, Its Predecessors and Its Enduring Legacy. McFarland, 2019.
- Rentschler, Eric. The Ministry of Illusion: Nazi Cinema and Its Afterlife. Harvard University Press, 1996.
