= Olaf Bach =

German actor (1892–1963)

- Born: 7 April 1892; Hamburg, German Empire
- Died: 1 November 1963 (aged 71)
- Occupation: Actor
- Years active: 1921–1943 (film)

Olaf Bach (7 April 1892 – 1 November 1963) was a German film actor.

== Selected filmography ==
- Honour Among Thieves (1933)
- When the Village Music Plays on Sunday Nights (1933)
- William Tell (1934)
- Trouble with Jolanthe (1934)
- The Lost Valley (1934)
- Stjenka Rasin (1936)
- Shadows Over St. Pauli (1938)
- Women for Golden Hill (1938)
- The Impossible Mister Pitt (1938)
- The Indian Tomb (1938)
- The Star of Rio (1940)
- The Way to Freedom (1941)
- Back Then (1943)

== Bibliography ==
- Goble, Alan. The Complete Index to Literary Sources in Film. Walter de Gruyter, 1999.
