= Peer Gynt (1934 film) =

1934 film directed by Fritz Wendhausen

- Directed by: Fritz Wendhausen
- Written by: Richard Billinger; Fritz Reck-Malleczewen; Josef Stolzing-Czerny
- Based on: Peer Gynt by Henrik Ibsen
- Produced by: Guido Bagier; Adolf Essek
- Starring: Hans Albers; Lucie Höflich; Marieluise Claudius
- Cinematography: Carl Hoffmann
- Edited by: Carl Otto Bartning; Ella Ensink
- Music by: Giuseppe Becce; Edvard Grieg
- Production company: Bavaria Film
- Distributed by: Bavaria Film
- Release date: 17 December 1934
- Running time: 119 minutes
- Country: Germany
- Language: German

Peer Gynt is a 1934 German drama film directed by Fritz Wendhausen and starring Hans Albers, Lucie Höflich and Marieluise Claudius. It is based on the play Peer Gynt by Henrik Ibsen.

It was one of the most expensive productions made by Bavaria Film and involved location shooting in Norway. The film's sets were designed by the art directors Karl Vollbrecht and Hermann Warm.

== Cast ==
- Hans Albers as Peer Gynt
- Lucie Höflich as Mutter Aase
- Marieluise Claudius as Solveig
- Ellen Frank as Ingrid
- Olga Chekhova as Baronin
- Lizzi Waldmüller as Tatjana
- Zehra Achmed as Anitra
- Richard Ryen as Gunarson
- Hans Schultze as Schmied Aslak
- F. W. Schröder-Schrom as Vater Solveigs
- Leopoldine Sangora a sMutter Solveigs
- Friedrich Kayßler as Kiensley
- Otto Wernicke as Parker
- Fritz Odemar as Silvan
- Alfred Döderlein as Mats Moen
- Mina Höcker-Behrens as Frau Rink
- Philipp Veit as Landstreicher
- Magda Lena as Eine Bäuerin
- Armand Zäpfel as Kapitän
- Willem Holsboer as John Bless
- O. E. Hasse as Steuermann
- Viktor Bell as Diener Ben

== Bibliography ==
- Kosta, Barbara (2009). Willing Seduction: The Blue Angel, Marlene Dietrich and Mass Culture. Berghahn Books. ISBN 978-0-85745-619-9.
