= Ulli and Marei =

- Directed by: Leopold Hainisch
- Written by: Leopold Hainisch; Eduard Köck
- Produced by: J.A. Vesely
- Starring: Eduard Köck; Attila Hörbiger; Ludwig Auer
- Cinematography: Günther Anders; Richard Angst; E.W. Fiedler
- Edited by: Munni Obal
- Music by: Alois Melichar
- Production company: Wien-Film
- Distributed by: Sascha-Verleih
- Release date: 23 April 1948
- Running time: 87 minutes
- Country: Austria
- Language: German

Ulli and Marei (German: Ulli und Marei) is a 1948 Austrian drama film directed by Leopold Hainisch and starring Eduard Köck, Attila Hörbiger and Ludwig Auer. It was made by Wien-Film in German-occupied Austria. It is a heimatfilm shot in the Tyrolean Alps. It was completed in 1945 towards the end of the Second World War, and was not given a full release until 1948.

The film's sets were designed by the art director Fritz Jüptner-Jonstorff.

== Cast ==
- Eduard Köck as Der Bauer am Markthof
- Attila Hörbiger as Ulli, Knecht
- Ludwig Auer as Malt, Knecht
- Hermann Erhardt as Manz, Knecht
- Hans Dengel as Turtel, Knecht
- Mimi Gstöttner-Auer as Lena, Wirtschafterin
- Marie Wiesinger as Zenz, die Magd
- Anna Exl as Agnes, Bäurin am Klarerhof
- Ilse Exl as Marei, ihre Tochter
- Josef Brosche as Girgl, das Knechtl am Klarerhof
- Ernst Auer as Karl, ein Monteur
- Hertha Agostini as Marie, seine Schwester
- Leonhard Auer
- August Burger
- Leopold Hainisch
- Hans Kratzer
- Jenny Liese
- Franz Ludwig
- Friedrich Neubauer
- Hans Pachler
- Anna Zötsch

== See also ==
- Überläufer

== Bibliography ==
- Hans-Michael Bock and Tim Bergfelder. The Concise Cinegraph: An Encyclopedia of German Cinema. Berghahn Books.
