= Lightning Around Barbara =

1941 film

- Directed by: Werner Klingler
- Written by: Harald G. Petersson; Hanns Saßmann
- Produced by: Rolf Randolf
- Starring: Sybille Schmitz; Attila Hörbiger; Maria Koppenhöfer
- Cinematography: Sepp Allgeier
- Edited by: Roger von Norman
- Music by: Herbert Windt
- Production company: Rolf Randolf-Film
- Distributed by: Märkische-Panorama-Schneider
- Release date: 17 October 1941
- Running time: 81 minutes
- Country: Germany
- Language: German

Lightning Around Barbara (German: Wetterleuchten um Barbara) is a 1941 German drama film directed by Werner Klingler and starring Sybille Schmitz, Attila Hörbiger and Maria Koppenhöfer. It is a heimatfilm with Nazi propaganda overtones, set in the Tyrol region of Austria in the year of the Anschluss. It was shot at the Schönbrunn and Sievering Studios in Vienna and on location around Steinach am Brenner. The film's sets were designed by the art directors Gabriel Pellon and Heinrich Richter.

== Synopsis ==
In 1938, underground members of the Nazi movement in the Tyrol region face suppression from the Austrian Heimwehr. Martin Stammer and others flee across the border into Nazi Germany for shelter. In his absence his wife is forced to accuse him of murder in order to save her friend in a court trial. Her dilemma is resolved when her husband returns as part of the invading Germany forces.

== Cast ==
- Sybille Schmitz as Barbara Stammer
- Attila Hörbiger as Martin Stammer
- Maria Koppenhöfer as Stammermutter
- Oskar Sima as Gansterer, Ortskommandant der Frontmiliz
- Eduard Köck as Rottbichler
- Heinrich Heilinger as Dr. Heiderer
- Hans Jamnig as Sergeant Kratzer
- Georg Vogelsang as Altknecht Aegyd
- Leopold Esterle as Hansbauer
- Ilse Exl as Hansbäuerin
- Leopold Kerscher as Ödbauer
- Viktor Staal as Anton Walcher
- Maria Stadler as Wettl, Magd

== Bibliography ==
- Bock, Hans-Michael & Bergfelder, Tim. The Concise CineGraph. Encyclopedia of German Cinema. Berghahn Books, 2009.
- Klaus, Ulrich J. Deutsche Tonfilme: Jahrgang 1940. Klaus-Archiv, 2006.
- Richards, Jeffrey. Visions of Yesterday. Routledge & Kegan Paul, 1973.
- Waldman, Harry. Nazi Films in America, 1933-1942. McFarland, 2008.
