= The Song of Kaprun =

- Directed by: Anton Kutter
- Written by: Anton Kutter; Kurt Maix
- Starring: Waltraut Haas; Albert Lieven; Eduard Köck
- Cinematography: Josef Kirzeder; Gustav Weiß
- Edited by: Hildegard Giese-Goltz
- Music by: Willy Mattes
- Production companies: Bergland-Film; Süddeutsche Filmproduktion
- Distributed by: Union Film (Austria); Kopp-Filmverleih (W.Germany)
- Release date: 27 January 1955
- Running time: 109 minutes
- Countries: Austria; West Germany
- Language: German

The Song of Kaprun or The Song of the Hohe Tauern (German: Das Lied der Hohen Tauern) is a 1955 Austrian-German drama film directed by Anton Kutter and starring Waltraut Haas, Albert Lieven and Eduard Köck. It is set in Kaprun in the High Tauern mountain range.

The film's sets were designed by the art director Sepp Rothaur. It was shot on location in the state of Salzburg.

== Cast ==
- Waltraut Haas as Barbara Fuller
- Albert Lieven as Peter Dahle
- Eduard Köck as Hans Tribusser
- Ida Krottendorf as Maria, seine Enkelin
- Joachim Fuchsberger as Der 'schöne Eugen'
- Kurt Heintel as Claus Rutenberg
- Gustl Gstettenbaur as Gustl Feller, Kranführer
- Jutta Bornemann as Gretl, seine Frau
- Peter Carsten as Bertl
- Walter Holten as Oberingenieur
- Hans Cossy as Tanzer
- Hans Hais as Dr. Bühler
- Leopold Esterle
- Johannes von Hamme as Kommerzialrat Fuller
- Klaus Pohl
- Anton Benedikt
- Hans Brand
- Gerhard Hofer
- Harry Kupetz
- Franz Ludwig
- Elisabeth Stiepl as Frau Brandlhuber

== Bibliography ==
- Fritsche, Maria. Homemade Men in Postwar Austrian Cinema: Nationhood, Genre and Masculinity. Berghahn Books, 2013.
