= Sejřek =

- Municipality
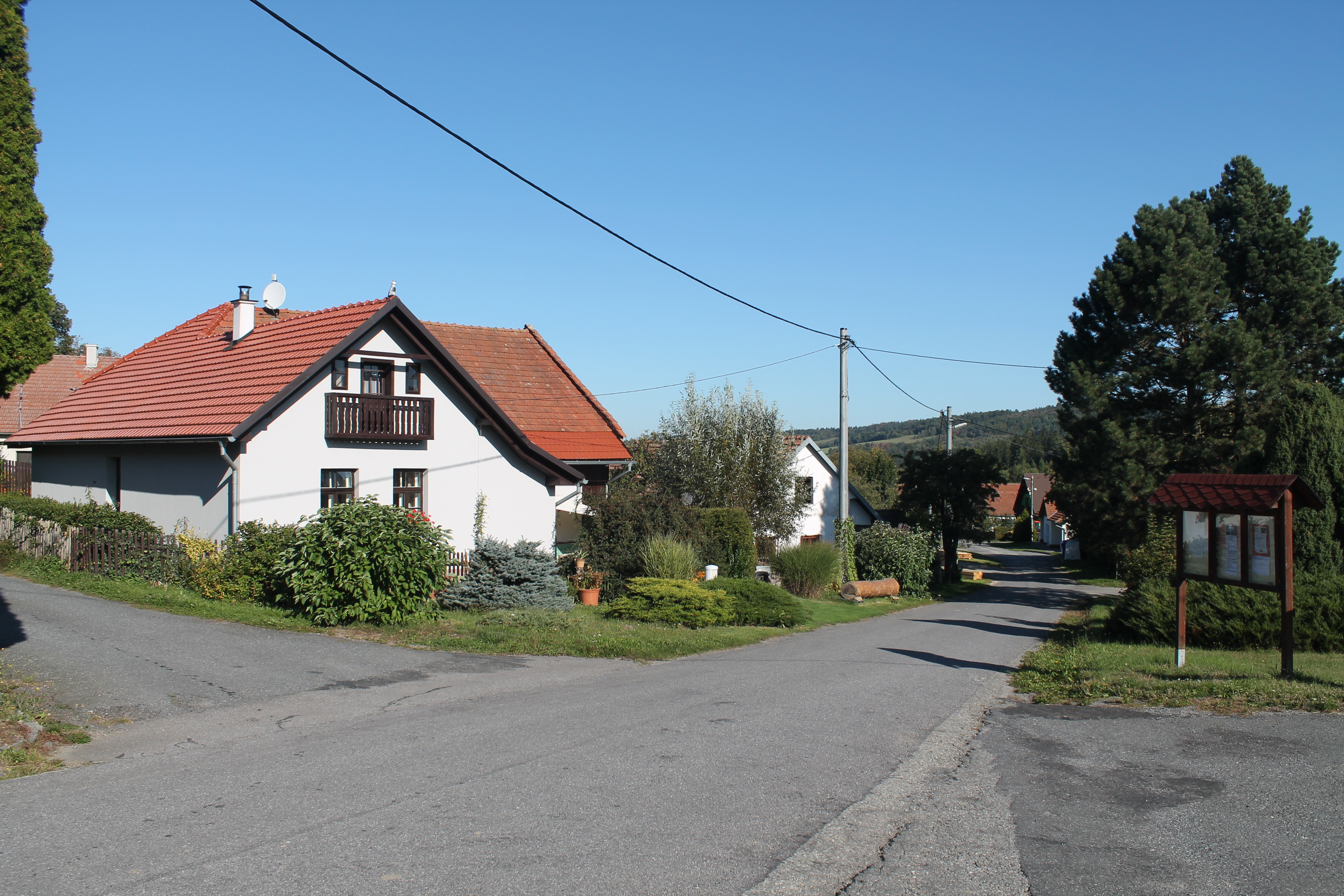
- Bor, a part of Sejřek

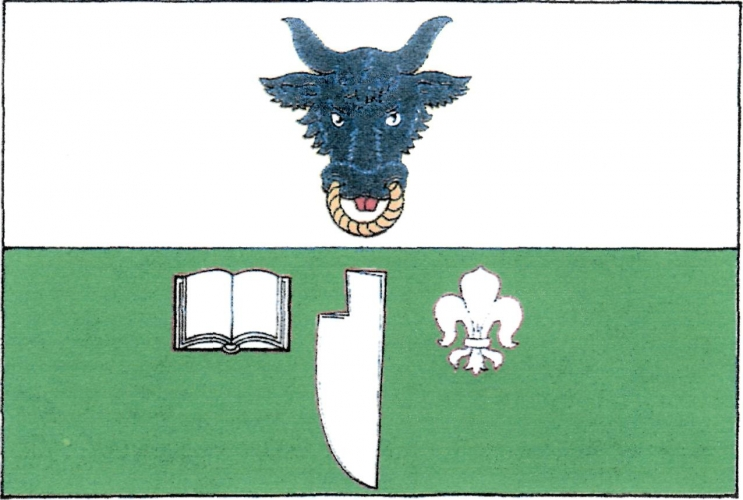
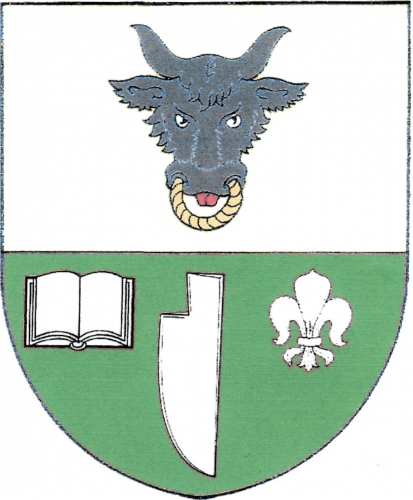
- Flag Coat of arms

- Location in the Czech Republic
- Coordinates: 49°26′10″N 16°18′33″E
- Country: Czech Republic
- Region: Vysočina
- District: Žďár nad Sázavou
- First mentioned: 1350

Area
  - Total: 7.51 km^{2} (2.90 sq mi)
- Elevation: 518 m (1,699 ft)

Population (2026-01-01)
  - Total: 178
  - Density: 23.7/km^{2} (61.4/sq mi)
- Time zone: UTC+1 (CET)
  - Summer (DST): UTC+2 (CEST)
- Postal code: 592 62
- Website: www.sejrek-bor.cz

Sejřek is a municipality and village in Žďár nad Sázavou District in the Vysočina Region of the Czech Republic. It has about 200 inhabitants.

== Administrative division ==
Sejřek consists of two municipal parts (in brackets population according to the 2021 census):

- Sejřek (130)
- Bor (42)

== Geography ==
Sejřek is located about 30 kilometres (19 mi) southeast of Žďár nad Sázavou and 31 km (19 mi) northwest of Brno. It lies in the Upper Svratka Highlands. The highest point is at 581 m (1,906 ft) above sea level. The Nedvědička Stream flows along the northern municipal border.

== History ==
The first written mention of Sejřek is from 1350. For centuries it was part of the Pernštejn estate.

== Demographics ==
Historical population

Year	Pop.	±%
1869	374	—
1880	446	+19.3%
1890	464	+4.0%
1900	413	−11.0%
1910	401	−2.9%

Year	Pop.	±%
1921	401	+0.0%
1930	371	−7.5%
1950	292	−21.3%
1961	260	−11.0%
1970	233	−10.4%

Year	Pop.	±%
1980	199	−14.6%
1991	166	−16.6%
2001	159	−4.2%
2011	175	+10.1%
2021	172	−1.7%

Source: Censuses

== Economy ==
In the municipal territory is a marble deposit.

== Transport ==
There are no railways or major roads passing through the municipality.

== Sights ==
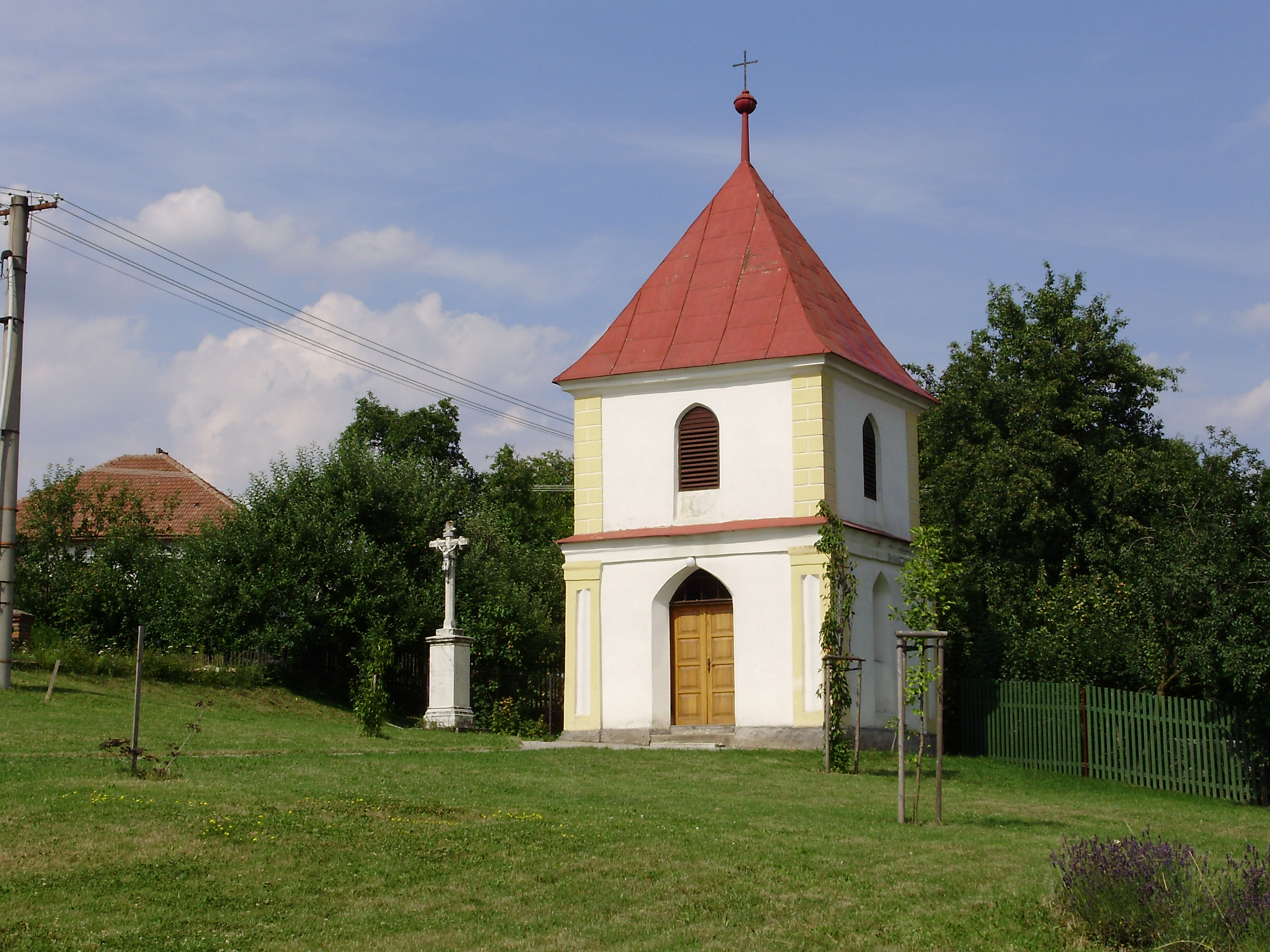
Chapel of Saint Anne

There are no protected cultural monuments in the municipality. The main cultural landmark is the Chapel of Saint Anne is the centre of Sejřek. It dates from 1876.

== Notable people ==
- Jiří Krytinář (1947–2015), actor
