= The Vulture Wally (1940 film) =

1940 film directed by Hans Steinhoff

- German film poster
- German: Die Geierwally
- Directed by: Hans Steinhoff
- Written by: Jacob Geis; Alexander Lix; Hans Steinhoff
- Based on: The Vulture Maiden by Wilhelmine von Hillern
- Produced by: Gerhard Staab
- Starring: Heidemarie Hatheyer; Sepp Rist; Eduard Köck
- Cinematography: Richard Angst
- Edited by: Ella Ensink
- Music by: Nico Dostal
- Production company: Tobis Film
- Distributed by: Tobis Film
- Release date: 12 August 1940
- Running time: 104 minutes
- Country: Germany
- Language: German

The Vulture Wally (German: Die Geierwally) is a 1940 German drama film directed by Hans Steinhoff and starring Heidemarie Hatheyer, Sepp Rist and Eduard Köck. It was filmed partly at the Johannisthal Studios in Berlin and featured extensive location shooting in the Tyrol. The film sets were designed by the art directors Hermann Warm and Johann Massias. The film is based on a popular novel, The Vulture Maiden by Wilhelmine von Hillern, which has been adapted for the screens several times.

== Synopsis ==
In the Tyrolean Alps, the headstrong Wally is banished to a remote mountain hut by her father after refusing an arranged marriage to the foreman Vinzenz, choosing instead to remain loyal to her unrequited love for Joseph. Living in isolation with a tamed vulture, she eventually returns as a wealthy heiress following her father's death, only to become consumed by jealousy over Joseph's perceived relationship with a woman named Afra. After Joseph publicly humiliates Wally at a village dance to defend Afra's reputation, a vengeful Wally orders Vinzenz to kill him. However, discovering that Afra is actually Joseph's daughter rather than his lover Wally rescues Joseph just in time for the two to reconcile.

== Cast ==
- Heidemarie Hatheyer as Wally Fender
- Sepp Rist as Joseph Brandl
- Eduard Köck as Alois Fender
- Winnie Markus as Afra Kuttner
- Leopold Esterle as Vinzenz Gellner
- Mimi Gstöttner-Auer as Luckard
- Ludwig Auer as Klettenmeier
- Maria Hofen as Mariann Rosenbauer
- Georg Vogelsang as Nicodemus Rosenbauer
- Hans Adalbert Schlettow as Leander Rosenbauer
- Käte Merk as Resi
- Marta Salm as Nani
- Anna Exl as Ochsenwirtin
- Hans Kratzer as Dorfbote
- Gustav Waldau as Count
- Franz Ludwig as Chief Forester
- Rolf Pinegger as Mayor
- Hans Hanauer as beneficiary
- Franzl Grüner as young guard

== Bibliography ==
- Klaus, Ulrich J. Deutsche Tonfilme: Jahrgang 1940. Klaus-Archiv, 1988.
