= Attila Hörbiger =

Austrian actor (1896–1987)

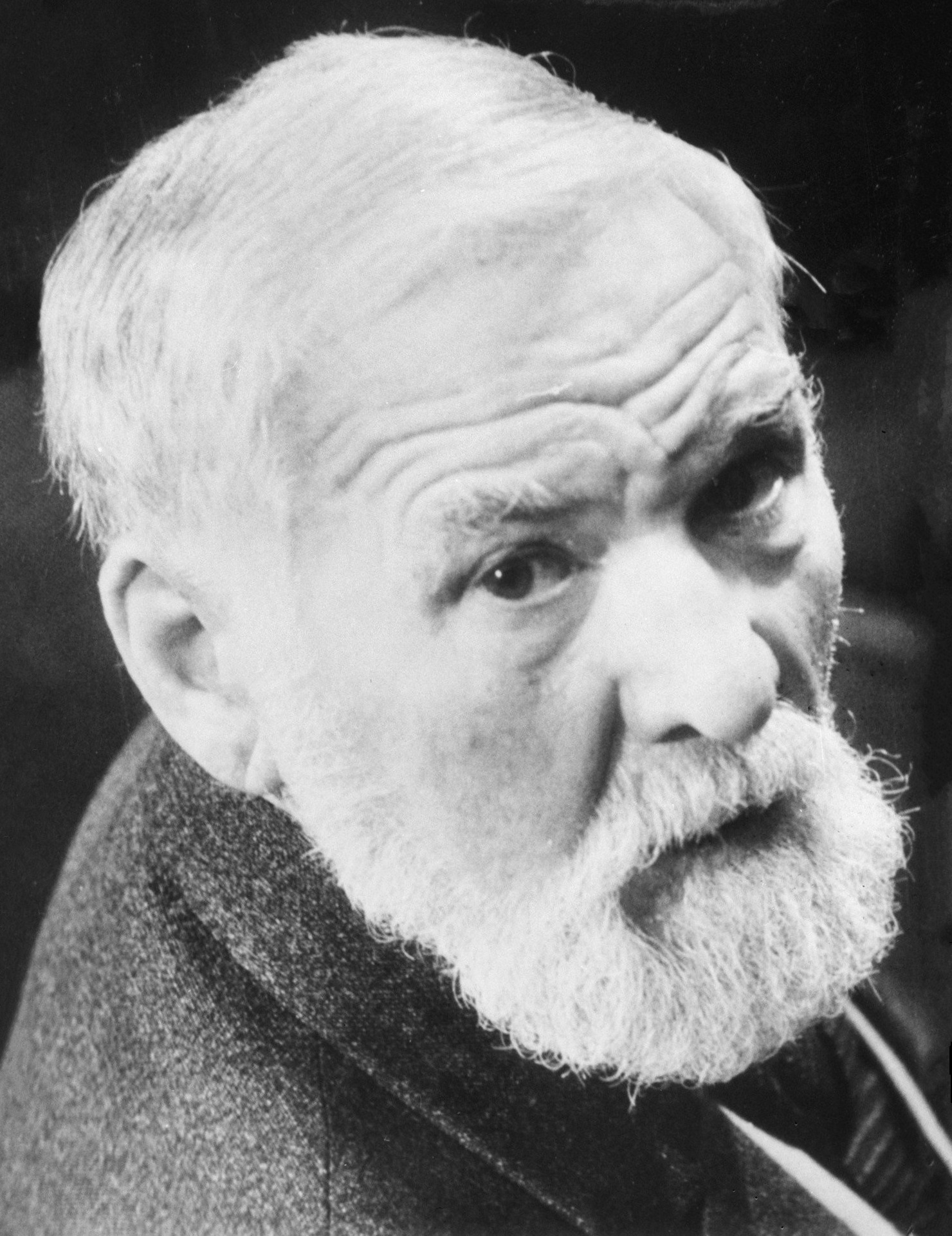
- Hörbiger in 1966
- Born: 21 April 1896; Budapest, Austria-Hungary
- Died: 27 April 1987 (aged 91); Vienna, Austria
- Occupation: Actor
- Years active: 1919–1985
- Spouse: Paula Wessely (m. 1935)
- Children: 3, including Christiane Hörbiger

Attila Hörbiger (21 April 1896 – 27 April 1987) was an Austrian stage and movie actor.

== Life ==
Hörbiger was born in the Hungarian capital Budapest, then part of the Austro-Hungarian Empire, the son of engineer Hanns Hörbiger and the younger brother of actor Paul Hörbiger. In 1903 his family moved to Vienna, where his father set up a design office. Attila attended the Benedictine gymnasium at Saint Paul's Abbey, Carinthia from 1906 to 1914.

He began his stage career at the Wiener Neustadt municipal theatre in 1919, followed by engagements in Stuttgart and Bozen. In 1921 he performed at the Raimund Theater in Vienna and at the Lehartheater in Bad Ischl; his next engagements were at the municipal theatre in Reichenberg (Liberec), at the Vienna stage of Josef Jarno, at the German Reduta Theatre in Brünn (Brno), and at the New German Theatre in Prague. In 1928, Hörbiger joined the Theater in der Josefstadt ensemble under director Max Reinhardt; and from 1950 to 1975, he was a member of the Burgtheater. He acted Rudolf von Habsburg in Grillparzer's König Ottokars Glück und Ende at the great reopening of the Burgtheater on 15 October 1955.

From 1935 to 1937, and again from 1947 to 1951, he took the title role in the summer performances of Hofmannsthal's play Jedermann (Everyman) at the Salzburg Festival – according to Max Reinhardt the best actor ever in this role.

Hörbiger started his film career in the late 1920s. In 1931, he starred in Die große Liebe, the first film ever directed by Otto Preminger. He played in several German and Austrian movies, often alongside his second wife, Paula Wessely, whom he had married in 1935. With her, he had three actress daughters, Elisabeth Orth (b. 1936), Christiane Hörbiger (b. 1938), and Maresa Hörbiger (b. 1945). After the Austrian Anschluss to Nazi Germany, Hörbiger joined the NSDAP. He and Paula Wessely starred in the anti-Polish propaganda film Heimkehr ("Homecoming") of 1941, directed by Gustav Ucicky.

Still in 1974, Hörbiger premiered as Nathan the Wise at the Burgtheater; he appeared in theatre performances until 1985. Two years later he died in Vienna at the age of 91 following a stroke. He is buried at the Grinzing cemetery. He is survived by his wife Paula Wessely, his three daughters, and three grandsons.

== Films ==
- Nachtlokal (1929)
- Ship of Girls (1929)
- The Deed of Andreas Harmer (1930)
- Das Wolgamädchen (1930)
- The Flute Concert of Sanssouci (1930)
- The Immortal Vagabond (1930)
- Die große Liebe (1931)
- Her Grace Commands (1931)
- The Emperor's Sweetheart (1931)
- Sehnsucht 202 (1932)
- Lumpenkavaliere (1932)
- The Tunnel (1933)
- Between Heaven and Earth (1934)
- Punks Arrives from America (1935)
- Variety (1935)
- Blood Brothers (1935)
- The Affairs of Maupassant (1935)
- Girls' Dormitory (1936)
- The Love of the Maharaja (1936)
- Harvest (1936)
- Premiere (1937)
- Revolutionshochzeit (1937)
- Mirror of Life (1938)
- The Girl with a Good Reputation (1938)
- Freight from Baltimore (1938)
- Between River and Steppe (1939)
- Stars of Variety (1939)
- Grenzfeuer (1939)
- Renate in the Quartet (1939)
- Woman in the River (1939)
- Donauschiffer (1940)
- Die letzte Runde (1940)
- Im Schatten des Berges (1940)
- Lightning Around Barbara (1941)
- Heimkehr (1941)
- Late Love (1943)
- Die kluge Marianne (1943)
- Die goldene Fessel (1943)
- Am Ende der Welt (1944)
- Freunde (1944)
- The Immortal Face (1947)
- Gottes Engel sind überall (1948)
- The Angel with the Trumpet (1948)
- Maresi (1948)
- Ulli and Marei (1948)
- Vagabonds (1949)
- Cordula (1950)
- The Fourth Commandment (1950)
- Maria Theresa (1951)
- Captive Soul (1952)
- The Spendthrift (1953)
- The Witch (1954)
- Walking Back into the Past (1954)
- Espionage (1955)
- Das Mädchen vom Pfarrhof (1955)
- The Major and the Bulls (1955)
- Crown Prince Rudolph's Last Love (1955)
- Der Meineidbauer (1956)
- Kaiserjäger (1956)
- Der Edelweißkönig (1957)
- Man nennt es Amore (1961)
- Der Alpenkönig und der Menschenfeind (1965)
- Karl May (1974)
- Rückkehr (1977)

== Decorations and awards ==
- 1950: Kammerschauspieler
- 1954: Merit Cross of the Federal Republic of Germany
- 1959: Kainz Medal
- 1961: Honorary Ring of the Vienna
- 1966: Grillparzer ring
- 1971: Honorary Member of the Burgtheater
- 1971: Austrian Cross of Honour for Science and Art, 1st class
- 1977: Grand Decoration of Honour in Gold for Services to the Republic of Austria
- 1980: Nestroy Ring
- 1985: Raymond Ring
