= National Board of Review Awards 1934 =

Annual US film awards ceremony

6th National Board of Review Awards
December 20, 1934

The 6th National Board of Review Awards were announced on December 20, 1934.

== Top Ten Films ==
1. It Happened One Night
2. The Count of Monte Cristo
3. Crime Without Passion
4. Eskimo
5. The First World War
6. The Lost Patrol
7. Lot in Sodom
8. No Greater Glory
9. The Thin Man
10. Viva Villa!

== Top Foreign Films ==
1. Man of Aran
2. The Blue Light
3. Catherine the Great
4. The Constant Nymph
5. Madame Bovary

== Winners ==
- Best Film: It Happened One Night
- Best Foreign Language Film: Man of Aran
