= Julia – Eine ungewöhnliche Frau =

German television series

- Starring: Christiane Hörbiger
- Country of origin: Germany

Julia – Eine ungewöhnliche Frau ("Julia: An Unusual Woman") is a German television series.

== See also ==
- List of German television series
