= Mahuliena, Golden Maiden =

Mahuliena, Golden Maiden (Czech: Mahulena, zlatá panna, German: Der treue Johannes) is co-production Slovak-German film fairy-tale in motif of Brothers Grimm's fairy-tale, Faithful Jan and Maiden Mahulena. The adventure fairy-tale about the brave prince wandering and his faithful butler Jan.

== Cast ==
- Vladimír Hajdu as Ján
- Remi Martin as Prince
- Lara Naszinsky as Mahuliena
- Maru Valdivielso as Woman
- Heinz Moog as King
- Jiří Krytinář as Zlatovlad / Golden Ruler
- Ján Kožuch as Stutterer
- Miroslav Noga as Bearded Man
- Ján Mildner as An Old Man
- Vilhelm Perháč as An Old Man

=== Creators ===
- Architect: Viliam Gruska
- Costume: Josef Jelínek, Peter Koza
- Executive Producer: František Dostál
- Location: Macocha, Orava, High Tatras, Vojka, Borinka, Lelský Ostrov
- Premiere: August 1987
