= Jiří Krytinář =

Czech actor (1947–2015)

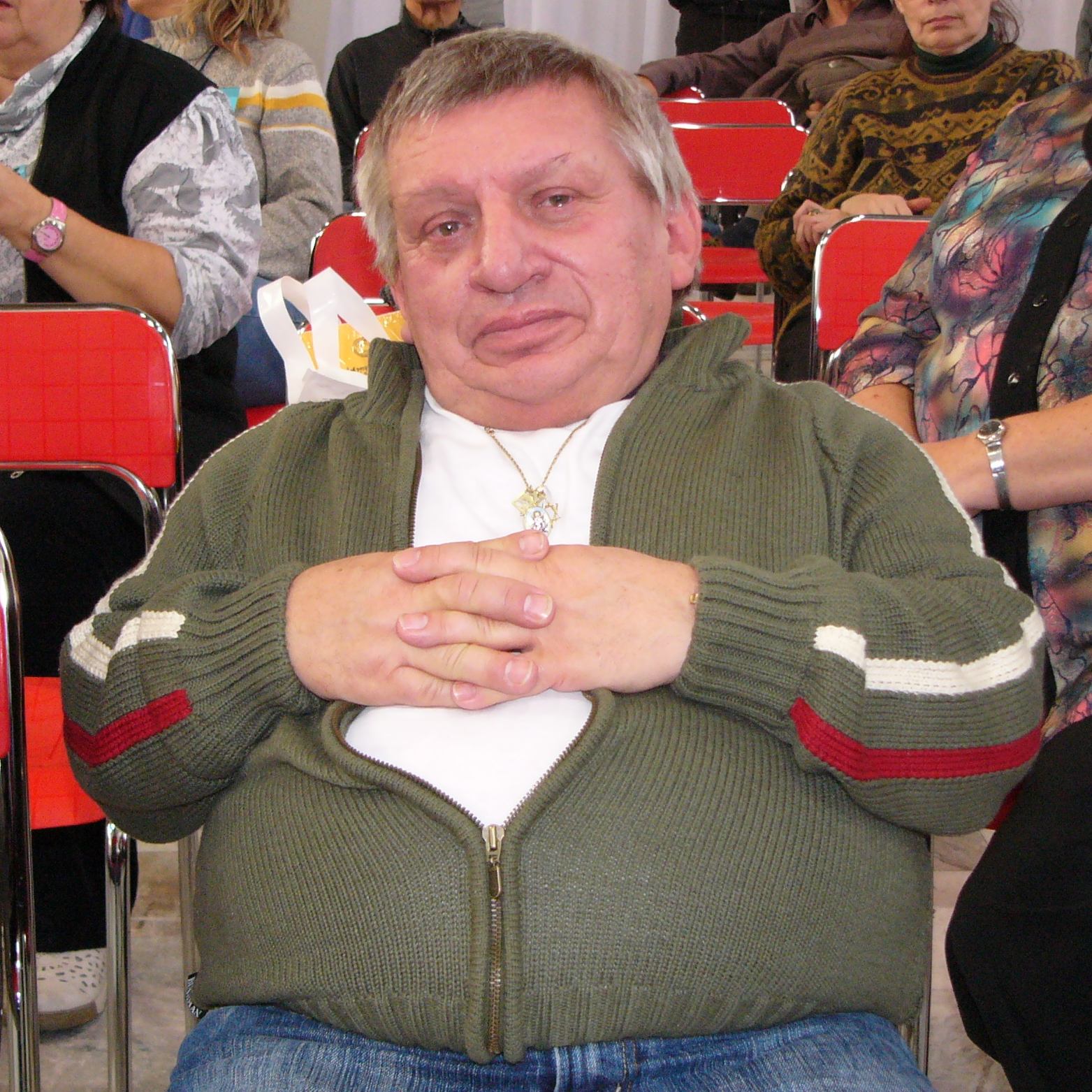
- Jiří Krytinář in 2007
- Born: 28 April 1947; Sejřek, Czechoslovakia
- Died: 29 September 2015 (aged 68); Jablonec nad Nisou, Czech Republic
- Occupation: Actor
- Years active: 1969–2010

Jiří Krytinář (28 April 1947 – 29 September 2015) was a Czech actor. With a height of 122 cm (4.00 ft), he was often cast in specific roles.

== Biography ==
Krytinář was born on 28 April 1947 to the gamekeeper's family in Sejřek. At the age of three, he was diagnosed with osteochondrodysplasia and stopped growing. As an adult, he reached a height of 122 cm (4.00 ft). He trained as a watchmaker and then moved to Jablonec nad Nisou. He was acting from 1969 and professionally from 1981, when he became employed in Barrandov Studios.

Krytinář worked in the Alhambra Theatre, the Karel Heřmánek Theatre, the Bez Zábradlí Theatre and was a member of the Musical Theatre Karlín. During his film career, he was cast in 70 roles, including several abroad. He died on 29 September 2015 of a pulmonary embolism, at the age of 68.

== Selected filmography ==
- 2008 – The Chronicles of Narnia: Prince Caspian
- 2008 – Bathory
- 2005 – Lunacy
- 1997 – An Ambiguous Report About the End of the World
- 1997 – The Hunchback
- 1996 – Hospoda (TV series)
- 1992 – The Tigress
- 1986 – Mahuliena, Golden Maiden
- 1985 – Howling II: Your Sister Is a Werewolf
- 1984 – Fešák Hubert
- 1984 – Amadeus
- 1980 – Arabela (TV series)
- 1973 – Tři oříšky pro Popelku
- 1971 – The Girl on the Broomstick
