= The Major and the Bulls =

1955 film

- Directed by: Eduard von Borsody
- Written by: Per Schwenzen; Eduard von Borsody
- Based on: The Major and the Bulls by Hans Venatier
- Produced by: Adolf Hannemann; Karl Schulz
- Starring: Fritz Tillmann; Christiane Hörbiger; Attila Hörbiger
- Cinematography: Walter Riml
- Edited by: Eva Kroll
- Music by: Bert Grund
- Production companies: Allianz Filmproduktion; Beuhneund Film
- Distributed by: Allianz Filmverleih
- Release date: 28 October 1955
- Running time: 95 minutes
- Country: West Germany
- Language: German

The Major and the Bulls (German: Der Major und die Stiere) is a 1955 West German comedy film directed by Eduard von Borsody and starring Fritz Tillmann, Christiane Hörbiger and Attila Hörbiger. It is based on the 1953 novel of the same title by Hans Venatier. It was shot at the Bavaria Studios in Munich and in Wiesbaden. The film's sets were designed by the art director Ernst Schomer.

== Synopsis ==
Following the Second World War, Allied forces arrive to occupy Germany. In Bavaria in the American Zone, an army major tries to prevent fraternising between his troops and the locals. This quickly breaks down as several romantic relationships begin between local girls and the G.I.s while the obstinate peasants eventually overcome their dislike of being ordered about by the military.

== Cast ==
- Fritz Tillmann as Major William Sunlet
- Christiane Hörbiger as Marie
- Attila Hörbiger as Koltnerbauer
- Hans von Borsody as George
- Eva Probst as Mrs. Wendlandt
- Chris Howland as Sergeant Bobby
- Olga von Togni as Koltnerbäuerin
- Maria Hofen as Stockbäuerin
- Carsta Löck as Hebamme
- Katharina Brauren as Riedbäuerin
- Nora Minor as Säusepp-Bäuerin
- Hans Stadtmüller as Aigner
- Reinhold Siegert as Krotthefner
- Heinz Laube as Riedbauer
- Konrad Mayerhoff as Fengerl
- Karl Meixner as Säusepp-Bauer
- Alfred Menhardt as Zand
- Klaus Pohl as Stockbauer
- Ulrich Beiger as CIC-Leutnant Houseman
- Alexander Golling as Landrat Spiegel
- Kurt Hepperlin as Luck
- Ingrid Lutz as Sigrid

== Bibliography ==
- Fehrenbach, Heide. Cinema in Democratizing Germany: Reconstructing National Identity After Hitler. University of North Carolina Press, 2000.
