= Leopold Hainisch =

Austrian actor and film director (1891–1979)

- Born: 2 November 1891; Vienna, Austro-Hungarian Empire
- Died: 21 February 1979 (aged 87); Hamburg, West Germany
- Occupations: Actor, Director
- Years active: 1940–1979 (film)

Leopold Hainisch (1891–1979) was an Austrian actor and film director.

== Selected filmography ==
=== Actor ===
- Ulli und Marei (1948)
- Viennese Girls (1949) – Karl Haslinger
- Cabaret (1954) – Leopold Holzinger
- Walking Back into the Past (1954)
- The Last Ten Days (1955) – Generalfeldmarschall Wilhelm Keitel
- Castle in Tyrol (1957) – Direktor Rothmüller
- Arena of Fear (1959) – Riley
- Charley's Aunt (1963) – Aristide Raby (uncredited)
- The Hamburg Syndrome (1979) – Professor Placek (final film role)

=== Director ===
- Falstaff in Vienna (1940)
- Laugh Bajazzo (1943)
- Earth (1947)
- Ulli and Marei (1948)
- Veronika the Maid (1951)
- The Spendthrift (1953)

== Bibliography ==
- Charles P. Mitchell. The Great Composers Portrayed on Film, 1913 through 2002. McFarland, 2004.
