= Marieluise Claudius =

German actress (1912–1941)

- Born: Marie Luise Claudius; 6 January 1912; Meiningen, German Empire
- Died: 2 August 1941 (aged 29); Berlin, Nazi Germany
- Years active: 1933–1940

Marie Luise Claudius (6 January 1912 – 2 August 1941) was a German actress.

Claudius was the daughter of the court actor and writer Erich Claudius and the actress Lisbeth Reschke. During her childhood, she appeared several times on the stage of the Meininger Theater. Her first engagement was in 1932 in Düsseldorf.

At the age of 29 years she died of heart failure and was buried in the New Cemetery Wannsee in Berlin. Her grave has since been lost.

== Filmography ==
- Ripening Youth (as Christa von Borck, a high schooler) (1933)
- The Lost Valley (as Verena Stettler, daughter) (1934)
- The Voice of Love (as Zenzi (as Marie Luise Claudius) (1934)
- Trouble with Jolanthe (as Sophie, her sister) (1934)
- Peer Gynt (as Solveig) (1934)
- The Valley of Love (as Lisbeth) (1935)
- The Red Rider (as Etelka, her daughter) (1935)
- I Was Jack Mortimer (as Marie Polikow) (1935)
- The Old and the Young King (as Princess Wilhelmine) (1935)
- Die Entführung (as Suzanne Merville) (1936)
- Augustus the Strong (1936) (as Countess Anna Constanze Cosel) (1936)
- Pan (as Eva) (1937)
- The Man Who Was Sherlock Holmes (as Mary Berry) (1937)
- Einmal werd' ich Dir gefallen (as Matthesi Stuck) (1938)
- Maja zwischen zwei Ehen (as Eva Adrian) (1938)
- Schatten über St. Pauli (as Hanna Carstens) (1938)
- Ein Robinson (as Antje) (1940)
