= Veronika the Maid =

1951 film

- Directed by: Leopold Hainisch
- Written by: Harald Bratt
- Starring: Ilse Exl; Viktor Staal; Ilse Steppat
- Cinematography: Friedl Behn-Grund
- Music by: Giuseppe Becce
- Production company: Elton-Film
- Distributed by: Constantin Film
- Release date: 13 September 1951
- Running time: 105 minutes
- Country: West Germany
- Language: German

Veronika the Maid (German: Veronika, die Magd) is a 1951 West German drama film directed by Leopold Hainisch and starring Ilse Exl, Viktor Staal and Ilse Steppat. It was shot at the Göttingen Studios. The film's sets were designed by the art director Walter Haag.

== Cast ==
- Ilse Exl as Veronika
- Viktor Staal as Richard
- Ilse Steppat as Alice
- Paul Hörbiger as Jansen sen.
- Wolfgang Lukschy as Freddy
- Eduard Köck as Joseph
- Anna Exl
- Ernst Auer as Brantner
- Albert Florath
- Erich Ponto
- Gerd Frickhöffer
- Ludwig Auer
- Ilka Hugo
- Tilo von Berlepsch
- August Burger

== Bibliography ==
- Wiesen, S. Jonathan (2004). West German Industry and the Challenge of the Nazi Past: 1945–1955. University of North Carolina Press. ISBN 978-0807855430.
