= Road to Home =

1952 film

- Directed by: Romano Mengon
- Written by: Romano Mengon
- Based on: Der Fremde by Romano Mengon
- Produced by: Hans Böcker; Franz Grohmann
- Starring: Angelika Hauff; Rolf Moebius; Eduard Köck
- Cinematography: Kurt Hasse
- Edited by: Adolf Schlyssleder
- Music by: Giuseppe Becce
- Production company: Alba-Film
- Distributed by: Adler Film
- Release date: 4 March 1952
- Running time: 86 minutes
- Country: West Germany
- Language: German

Road to Home (German: Straße zur Heimat) is a 1952 West German drama film directed by Romano Mengon and starring Angelika Hauff, Rolf Moebius and Eduard Köck. It was shot at the Bavaria Studios in Munich and on location around Bolzano, Merano, the Dolomites, Lake Garda, Rapallo and Genoa The film's sets were designed by the art director Gottfried zum Winkel. It was the only-post-war work of the director Mengon who had previously made several films in the Weimar Republic. It is part of the popular tradition of Heimatfilm.

== Synopsis ==
Walter Neuhauser, an engineer who was forcibly expelled from his East Prussian homeland at the end of the Second World War, but struggles to find employment in West Germany. Looking for work he heads for Italy. In the South Tyrol, amongst the German-speaking inhabitants, he gains work on a farm. He falls for Fanny Moser, but her father disapproves of him. He heads south to Genoa and becomes involved with a smuggling ring. Eventually he returns to the South Tyron to be with Fanny, accepting this as his new homeland to replace the one he last in the east.

== Cast ==
- Angelika Hauff as Fanny Moser
- Rolf Moebius as Walter Neuhauser
- Eduard Köck as Fannys Vater
- Hella Petri as Evi Faber
- Anna Exl as Resel
- Pero Alexander as Bill
- Louis V. Arco as Jonny Pospidil
- Jeanne Darville as Lia

== Bibliography ==
- Höfig, Willi. Der deutsche Heimatfilm 1947–1960. F. Enke, 1973.
