= Lucie Höflich =

German actress (1883–1956)

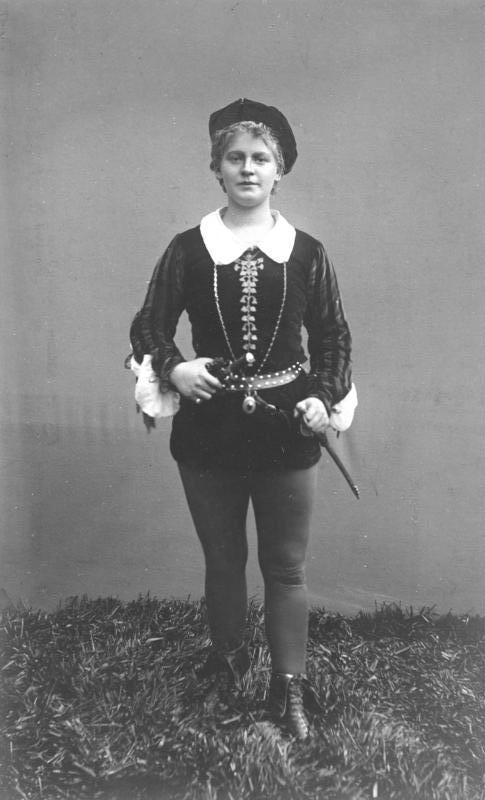
- Höflich as Viola in Twelfth Night in 1907
- Born: Helene Lucie von Holwede; 20 February 1883; Hanover, German Empire
- Died: 9 October 1956 (aged 73); West Berlin, West Germany
- Occupations: Actress; teacher

Lucie Höflich (born Helene Lucie von Holwede; 20 February 1883 – 9 October 1956) was a German actress, teacher and head of the Staatliche Schauspielschule (State Drama School) in Berlin. In 1937 she was named the Staats-Schauspielerin (State Actress) and in 1953 she was awarded the Bundesverdienstkreuz.

== Stage appearances ==
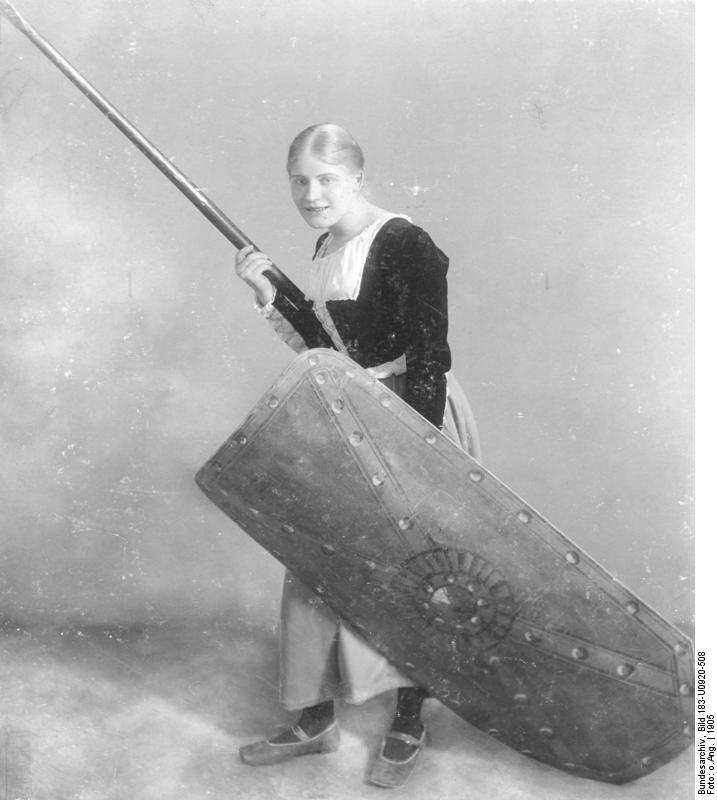
Höflich as Kätchen in Kleist's Das Käthchen von Heilbronn in 1905

Lucie Höflich was born in Hanover and debuted at the age of 16 at the Bromberg City Theater and in 1901 moved to the Intime Theater von Nürnberg, and then to the Raimund Theater in Vienna. In 1903 Max Reinhardt recruited her to the Deutsches Theater in Berlin where she performed until 1932.

Examples of her appearances were as Kätchen in Heinrich von Kleist's Das Käthchen von Heilbronn in 1905 and as Viola in Shakespeare's Twelfth Night in 1907. While still active on stage she appeared in her first film, the Gendarm Möbius in 1913.

She died in West Berlin in 1956, aged 73.

== Selected filmography ==
Among the films she acted in were Maria Magdalene in 1929, Die Straße in 1923, Tartüff in 1925, the 1936 The Abduction of the Sabine Women, the Nazi Propaganda Film Ohm Krüger in 1941, with her last being the 1956 The Story of Anastasia.

- Mary Magdalene (1920) as Klara
- Catherine the Great (1920) as Catherine the Great
- The Rats (1921) as Mrs. John
- Seafaring Is Necessary (1921)
- The Inheritance of Tordis (1921) as Anna Kathrins's mother
- A Glass of Water (1923) as the Duchess of Marlborough
- The Lost Shoe (1923) as Countess Benrat
- The Street (1923) as the wife of the petty bourgeois man
- Nora (1923) as Mrs. Linden
- Kaddish (1924)
- The Secret Agent (1924) as the Duchess's mother
- A Waltz Dream (1925)
- Goetz von Berlichingen of the Iron Hand (1925)
- The House of Lies (1926) as Gina
- Only a Dancing Girl (1926) as Mrs. Radinger
- The Beaver Coat (1928) as Mrs. Wolff
- Life's Circus (1928) as the wife
- 1914 (1931) as the Czarina
- The White Demon (1932) as Gildemeister's Mother
- The Golden Anchor (1932) as Honorine
- The Burning Secret (1933) as the wife's mother
- Peer Gynt (1934) as Mother Aase
- Family Parade (1936) as Mrs. Applequist
- The Czar's Courier (1936) as Marfa Strogoff
- The Abduction of the Sabine Women (1936) as Rosa
- The Citadel of Warsaw (1937) as Frau Welgorska
- Robert Koch (1939) as Mrs. Paul
- We Danced Around the World (1939) as Jenny Hill
- The Fox of Glenarvon (1940) as Baroness Margit O'Connor
- Ohm Krüger (1941) as Sanna Krüger
- Das Grosse Spiel (1942) as Mrs. Klebuch
- An Old Heart Becomes Young Again (1943) as Frau Blume
- Laugh Bajazzo (1943) as Emelia
- Sky Without Stars (1955) as Mother Mathilde Kaminski
- The Story of Anastasia (1956) as Mrs. Bäumle
