= The Abduction of the Sabine Women (1936 film) =

1936 film by Robert A. Stemmle

- Directed by: Robert A. Stemmle
- Written by: Robert A. Stemmle; Franz von Schönthan (play); Paul von Schönthan (play)
- Produced by: Carl Froelich
- Starring: Bernhard Wildenhain; Max Gülstorff; Maria Koppenhöfer
- Cinematography: Reimar Kuntze
- Edited by: Anna Höllering
- Music by: Harald Böhmelt
- Production company: Carl Froelich-Film
- Distributed by: Europa-Filmverleih; Tobis-Sascha Film
- Release date: 1 March 1936
- Running time: 93 minutes
- Country: Germany
- Language: German

The Abduction of the Sabine Women (German: Der Raub der Sabinerinnen) is a 1936 German comedy film directed by Robert A. Stemmle and starring Bernhard Wildenhain, Max Gülstorff, and Maria Koppenhöfer. It was based on a play which has been adapted into films several times. It was shot at the Carl Froelich's Berlin Studios located in Tempelhof. The film's sets were designed by the art directors Walter Haag and Franz Schroedter.

== Plot ==
High school professor Gollwitz wrote a play as a student, which he now describes as a youthful sin. Low-rent theater impresario Emanuel Striese, who is struggling with numerous problems in the ensemble and is also not well off financially, finds out about it and wants to perform it with his family. He is able to persuade Gollwitz, who only agrees on the condition that he is not named and that his wife does not find out. Of course, the wife comes back from vacation early and nothing goes according to plan. In the end, Ms. Striese has a saving idea.

== Cast ==
- Bernhard Wildenhain as Emanuel Striese, Theaterdirector
- Max Gülstorff as Professor Martin Gollwitz
- Maria Koppenhöfer as Friederike Gollwitz
- Ilse Petri as Paula Gollwitz
- Hilde Sessak as Marianne Neumeister
- Hans Brausewetter as Dr. Leopold Neumeister
- Lucie Höflich as Rosa, Dienstmädchen
- Trude Hesterberg as Adelgunde Striese
- Grethe Weiser as Gretchen von Tharau, Soubrette & Naive
- Jupp Hussels as Emil Sterneck, 1. Liebhaber
- Paul Westermeier as Karl Groß
- Erika von Schaper as Lucie, Dienstmädchen
- Walter Bienenstein as Romeo Striese
- Ulla Gauglitz as Julia Striese
- Waldemar Müller as Ferdinard Striese
- Renate Howe as Luise Striese
- Ibo Löschke as Hadubrand Striese
- Heinz Förster-Ludwig as Karl Böllermann
- Max Hochstetter as Balduin Pfeffer
- Hugo Froelich as Wurzelmann, Souffleur
- Horst Birr as Willi Methge, Oberprimaner
- Rolf Müller as Schröder I, Oberprimaner
- Peter Jäger as Schröder II, Oberprimaner
- Lieselotte Moll-König as Melanie, Paulas Freundin

== See also ==
- The Abduction of the Sabine Women (1928)
- Romulus and the Sabines (Italy, 1945)
- The Abduction of the Sabine Women (1954)

== Bibliography ==
- Goble, Alan (1999). The Complete Index to Literary Sources in Film. Berlin: Walter de Gruyter. ISBN 978-3-11-095194-3.
- Klaus, Ulrich J. Deutsche Tonfilme: Jahrgang 1936. Klaus-Archiv, 1988.
