= The Spendthrift (1953 film) =

1953 film by Leopold Hainisch

- Directed by: Leopold Hainisch
- Written by: Ferdinand Raimund (play); Emanuel von Richter
- Starring: Attila Hörbiger; Josef Meinrad; Maria Andergast
- Cinematography: Oskar Schnirch
- Edited by: Henny Brünsch
- Music by: Konradin Kreutzer; Alfred Uhl
- Production company: Dillenz-Film
- Distributed by: Union Film Wien
- Release date: 9 February 1953
- Running time: 96 minutes
- Country: Austria
- Language: German

The Spendthrift (German: Der Verschwender) is a 1953 Austrian historical musical film directed by Leopold Hainisch and starring Attila Hörbiger, Josef Meinrad and Maria Andergast. It is an adaptation of Ferdinand Raimund's play of the same name.

The film's sets were designed by the art director Gustav Abel. It was shot in Gevacolor.

== Cast ==
- Attila Hörbiger as Julius von Flottwell & Der Bettler
- Josef Meinrad as Valentin, Bedienter
- Maria Andergast as Rosa, Kammermädchen
- Heinz Moog as Wolf, Kammerdiener
- Fred Hennings as Präsident von Klugheim
- Senta Wengraf as Amalie, seine Tochter
- Erwin Strahl as Baron Flitterstein
- Felix Steinboeck as Chevalier Dumont
- Ernst Nadherny as Herr von Pralling
- Maria Eis as Frau von Pralling
- Viktor Braun
- Traute Eschelmüller
- Hugo Gottschlich
- Gerhard Kittler
- Maria Loja
- Ferdinand Mayerhofer
- Alfred Neugebauer
- Wilhelm Schmidt
- Emmerich Schrenk
- Eva Sylt
- Eduard Volters
- Rosa Albach-Retty
- Hanni Schall as Fairy Cheristane
- Fritz Berger
- Oskar Deleglise
- Fritz Imhoff
- Friedrich Bergar

== Bibliography ==
- Fritsche, Maria. Homemade Men in Postwar Austrian Cinema: Nationhood, Genre and Masculinity. Berghahn Books, 2013.
