= Shadows Over St. Pauli =

1938 film

- Directed by: Fritz Kirchhoff
- Written by: Harald Baumgarten (novel); Ernst Hasselbach; Per Schwenzen
- Produced by: Fred Lyssa
- Starring: Marieluise Claudius; Gustav Knuth; Hellmuth Bergmann
- Cinematography: Fritz Arno Wagner
- Edited by: Walter Wischniewsky
- Music by: Wolfgang Zeller
- Production company: Terra Film
- Distributed by: Terra Film
- Release date: 13 September 1938
- Running time: 82 minutes
- Country: Germany
- Language: German

Shadows Over St. Pauli (German:Schatten über St. Pauli) is a 1938 German drama film directed by Fritz Kirchhoff and starring Marieluise Claudius, Gustav Knuth and Hellmuth Bergmann. It was filmed and shot in Hamburg, and the title refers to the St. Pauli district of the city.

== Cast ==
- Marieluise Claudius as Hanna Carstens
- Gustav Knuth as Oschi Rasmus
- Hellmuth Bergmann as Wilhelm Schenk
- Harald Paulsen as Heinrich Lafrenz
- Theodor Loos as John Carstens
- Klaus Detlef Sierck as Hummel
- Maria Koppenhöfer as Mrs. Lafrens
- Walter Werner as Ohm Timmer
- Erich Dunskus as Ewermann
- Margot Erbst as Frau Ewermann
- Otty Eberhardt as Tante Guschi
- Alfred Maack as Bredenkamp
- Peter Elsholtz as Martens
- Wilhelm König as Fietje
- Paul Rehkopf as Schiffer Karl
- Ernst Rotmund as Kagelmacher
- Viggo Larsen as Kapitän Larsen
- Olaf Bach as Terbrüggen, Steuermann
- Albert Hehn as Ein junger Barkassenführer
- Charly Berger as Beamter der Wasserschutzpolizei
- Josef Kamper as Jan
- Karin Luesebrink as Junge Mädchen auf der 'Jungen Liebe'
- Trude Lehmann as Ein dickes Mädchen im Tanzlokal
- Herbert Lindner
- Arthur Reinhardt as Beamter
- Ernst Sattler as Müller Buchhalter
- Walter Steinbeck as Mr. Holdefleiß

== Bibliography ==
- Bock, Hans-Michael & Bergfelder, Tim. The Concise CineGraph. Encyclopedia of German Cinema. Berghahn Books, 2009.
