= Maria Koppenhöfer =

German actress

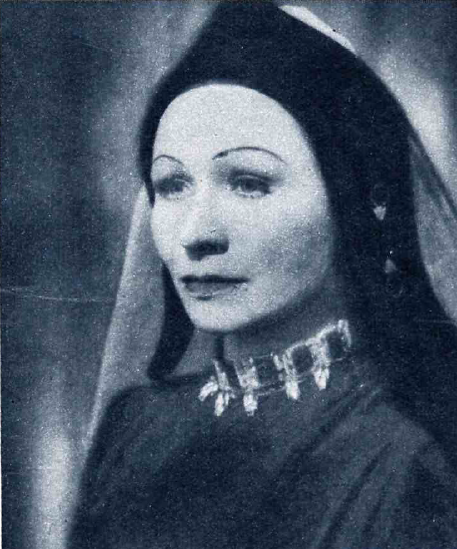
- Koppenhöfer in 1939
- Born: 11 December 1901; Stuttgart, German Empire
- Died: 29 November 1948 (aged 46); Heidelberg, Allied-occupied Germany
- Occupation: Film actor
- Years active: 1931–1945

Maria Koppenhöfer (11 December 1901 – 29 November 1948) was a German film actress.

== Selected filmography ==
- The Opera Ball (1931)
- 24 Hours in the Life of a Woman (1931)
- Unheimliche Geschichten (1932)
- The First Right of the Child (1932)
- A Song for You (1933)
- So Ended a Great Love (1934)
- Frisians in Peril (1935)
- Joan of Arc (1935)
- The Abduction of the Sabine Women (1936)
- The Ruler (1937)
- The Mountain Calls (1938)
- Shadows Over St. Pauli (1938)
- Anna Favetti (1938)
- The Great and the Little Love (1938)
- What Now, Sibylle? (1938)
- Midsummer Night's Fire (1939)
- Kora Terry (1940)
- Bismarck (1940)
- The Heart of a Queen (1940)
- Lightning Around Barbara (1941)
- The Rainer Case (1942)
- A Man With Principles? (1943)
