= Honour Among Thieves (1933 film) =

1933 film directed by Richard Oswald

- Directed by: Richard Oswald
- Written by: Heinz Goldberg; Charles Rudolph
- Based on: Honour Among Thieves by Charles Rudolph
- Produced by: Richard Oswald
- Starring: Fritz Kampers; Paul Westermeier; Paul Heidemann
- Cinematography: Ewald Daub
- Edited by: Else Baum
- Music by: Rolf Marbot
- Production company: Rio Film
- Distributed by: Terra Film
- Release date: 3 February 1933
- Running time: 115 minutes
- Country: Germany
- Language: German

Honour Among Thieves (German: Ganovenehre) is a 1933 crime drama film directed by Richard Oswald and starring Fritz Kampers, Paul Westermeier and Paul Heidemann. It was shot at the Tempelhof Studios in Berlin. The film's sets were designed by the art directors Walter Haag and Franz Schroedter. It was produced at the end of the Weimar era, shortly before the Nazi takeover. In May it was formally banned by the authorities. The Jewish Oswald left Germany and went into exile in Britain and America. It is based on a stage play by Charles Rudolph, later adapted again for the 1966 film Honour Among Thieves.

== Synopsis ==
Georg, a safecracker, is released from prison and finds himself adrift in Berlin. He meets Nelly, a young woman who secures him work and lodging at a brothel as one of the pimps. He ultimately breaks free from the gang who run the brothel and finds himself a mortal enemy of the gang leader Paul.

== Cast ==
- Fritz Kampers as Georg, "Artistenorje"
- Olly Stüwen as Olga, die Pariserin
- Paul Westermeier as Seidenemil
- Rotraut Richter as Nelly, der Backfisch
- Paul Heidemann as Importen-Paul
- Anton Pointner as Wiener-Max
- Hans Behal as Zahnbrecher-Artur
- Olaf Bach as Schränker-Karl
- Gudrun Ady as Mädchen bei Olga
- Lilli Durra as Zweites Mädchen bei Olga
- Richard Senius as Polizeikommissar

== Bibliography ==
- Frank, Stefanie Mathilde. Wiedersehen im Wirtschaftswunder: Remakes von Filmen aus der Zeit des Nationalsozialismus in der Bundesrepublik 1949–1963. V&R Unipress, 2017.
- Klaus, Ulrich J. Deutsche Tonfilme: Jahrgang 1933. Klaus-Archiv, 1988.
- Rentschler, Eric. The Ministry of Illusion: Nazi Cinema and Its Afterlife. Harvard University Press, 1996.
