= Earth (1947 film) =

- Directed by: Leopold Hainisch
- Written by: Karl Schönherr (play); Eduard Köck
- Starring: Eduard Köck; Ilse Exl; Anna Exl
- Cinematography: Richard Angst
- Music by: Willy Schmidt-Gentner
- Production companies: Tirol-Film; Omnia Film
- Distributed by: Tirol-Film
- Release date: 17 October 1947
- Running time: 82 minutes
- Countries: Austria; Switzerland
- Language: German

Earth (German: Erde) is a 1947 Austrian-Swiss drama film directed by Leopold Hainisch and starring Eduard Köck, Ilse Exl and Anna Exl. Shot in the Tyrolean Alps, it combines elements of both the heimatfilm and mountain film genres.

== Cast ==
- Eduard Köck as Der alte Grutz
- Ilse Exl as Christine, seine Tochter
- Anna Exl as Mena, Wirtschafterin
- Hertha Agostini as Trine
- Ernst Auer
- Leonhard Auer
- Ludwig Auer
- Leopold Esterle as Hans

== Bibliography ==
- Hans-Michael Bock and Tim Bergfelder. The Concise Cinegraph: An Encyclopedia of German Cinema. Berghahn Books.
