= Deutscher Vorlesepreis =

Deutscher Vorlesepreis was a literary prize of Germany. It ceased in 2013 after its sponsor Intersnack withdrew its sponsorship.
