= Eduard Köck =

Austrian actor

- Born: 26 February 1880; Innsbruck, Austro-Hungarian Empire
- Died: 3 November 1961 (aged 81); Innsbruck, Austria
- Occupation: Actor
- Years active: 1913-1960 (film)

Eduard Köck (26 February 1880 – 3 November 1961) was an Austrian stage and film actor. He made a few silent film appearances, but most of his screen performances were character roles during the 1940s and 1950s.

== Selected filmography ==
- The Prodigal Son (1934)
- Militiaman Bruggler (1936)
- Silhouettes (1936)
- Frau Sixta (1938)
- A Mother's Love (1939)
- I Am Sebastian Ott (1939)
- The Vulture Wally (1940)
- Lightning Around Barbara (1941)
- Vienna 1910 (1943)
- Kohlhiesel's Daughters (1943)
- Earth (1947)
- Ulli and Marei (1948)
- Cordula (1950)
- Veronika the Maid (1951)
- Road to Home (1952)
- The Last Reserves (1953)
- Dark Clouds Over the Dachstein (1953)
- The Cornet (1955)
- The Song of Kaprun (1955)

== Bibliography ==
- Fritsche, Maria. Homemade Men in Postwar Austrian Cinema: Nationhood, Genre and Masculinity. Berghahn Books, 2013.
