= Ludwig Auer =

Austrian actor

- Born: 24 August 1881; Bruneck, Austro-Hungarian Empire
- Died: 29 April 1954 (aged 72); Innsbruck, Austria
- Occupation: Actor
- Years active: 1921-1951 (film)

Ludwig Auer (1881–1954) was an Austrian stage and film actor.

== Filmography ==
Year	Title	Role	Notes
1921	Glaube und Heimat		
1933	Drei Kaiserjäger	Radetzky-Ahndl	
1940	The Vulture Wally	Klettenmeier	
1941	Der Meineidbauer	Quirin	
1942	Anuschka		
1947	Earth		
1948	Ulli and Marei	Malt, Knecht	
1951	Veronika the Maid		(final film role)

== Bibliography ==
- The New York Times Film Reviews, Volume 2. New York Times, 1932.
