= Hans Georg Nenning =

Austrian actor, author and director (born 1946)

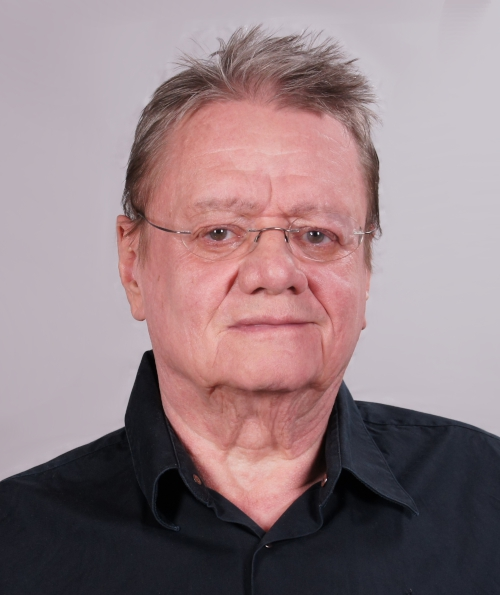
Hans Georg Nenning

Hans Georg Nenning (born 20 February 1946) is an Austrian actor, author and director.

== Early life and education ==
Born in Graz on 20 February 1946, he grew up in a well-situated family with an academic background. His father Dr. Hans Weingraber was a medical doctor, his mother Edith née Kainer a psychology student. During her second marriage to the journalist Günther Nenning, the name was changed to Hans Georg Nenning.

In 1959, Nenning moved with his parents to Vienna. After secondary school and doing military service he decided to become an actor. He studied at the Max Reinhardt Seminar in Vienna and made his debut on the stage of the Burgtheater. Theatre Engagements in “Die Komödianten”, Stadttheater Ulm, Volkstheater, Theater in der Josefstadt, Stadttheater Salzburg have come next.

== Career ==
Nenning appears in numerous film and television productions. For the European television production Eurocops he wrote the episode "Transit to Death" and played one of the leads therein. He also appeared in the US serial Band of Brothers, episode 9 ("Why We Fight").

In 2007, he made his directorial debut, and shot in Paris his first short Dusk.

In 2011, Nenning also became a novelist, publishing the collection Beyond the Light – Reports from the Future. In 2014, he published the end-time thriller Fading Away. followed by the 2015 novel Frozen Light, These were followed by the 2017 science fiction novel Cascade – The Mission. and 2018's Cascade – Dormir.
