= Käthe Gold =

Austrian actress (1907–1997)

Käthe Gold as a cleaning lady in an episode of Der Kommissar (1974)

Käthe Gold (11 February 1907 – 11 October 1997) was an Austrian actress.

Born in Vienna, she trained in that city as an actress and then went to Bern, Breslau (now Wrocław) and Munich. In 1932 she went to Berlin, where she remained until 1944. It was during those years that she had her greatest successes on the stage in plays such as Goethe's Faust (Gretchen), Shakespeare's Hamlet (Ophelia), and Ibsen's A Doll's House (Nora).

In 1944, Gold went to Zürich, and in 1947 she returned to Vienna, where she played at the Burgtheater.

Gold's stage career prevented her from appearing in many movies. Of the few films in which she did act, Amphitryon (1935, playing Alkmene), The Girl from Barnhelm (1940) and, after the war, Rose Bernd (1957) and Karl May (a 1976 biopic about Karl May) are notable. On TV she played Linda opposite Heinz Rühmann in a 1968 German language version of Arthur Miller's Death of a Salesman. She also had two guest appearances in the TV series, Der Kommissar.

Käthe Gold died in her native Vienna at the age of 90.

== Filmography ==
Year	Title	Role	Notes
1935	Amphitryon	Amphitryons Gemahlin Alkmene	
1935	The Valley of Love	Die Marktgräfin	
1937	Another World	Audrey	
1939	Die unheimlichen Wünsche	Pauline, Silhouettenschneiderin	
1940	The Girl from Barnhelm	Minna von Barnhelm	
1950	Der Wallnerbub	Monika - Davids Mutter	
1951	Eyes of Love	Schwester Agnes	
1952	Palace Hotel	Emilie - Zimmermädchen	
1956	Fuhrmann Henschel		
1957	Rose Bernd	Henriette Flamm	
1961	Der Bauer als Millionär	Lacrimosa	
1968	Death of a Salesman	Linda	TV movie
1974	Karl May	Klara May	
1980	Die Reise ins tausendjährige Reich	Martha Musil	

== Decorations and awards ==
- 1936: State actress in Berlin
- 1952: Chamber actress in Vienna
- 1960: Hans Reinhart Ring
- 1963: Austrian Cross of Honour for Science and Art
- 1965: Josef Kainz Medal for the presentation of Mistress Page in The Merry Wives of Windsor at the Burgtheater
- 1967: Gold Medal of Vienna
- 1977: Grand Silver Medal for Services to the Republic of Austria
- 1982: Honorary Ring of Vienna
- 1988: Gold Film Award for many years of excellent work in the German film industry
