= Grete Ly =

German soubrette, theater and silent film actress and film producer (1885–1942)

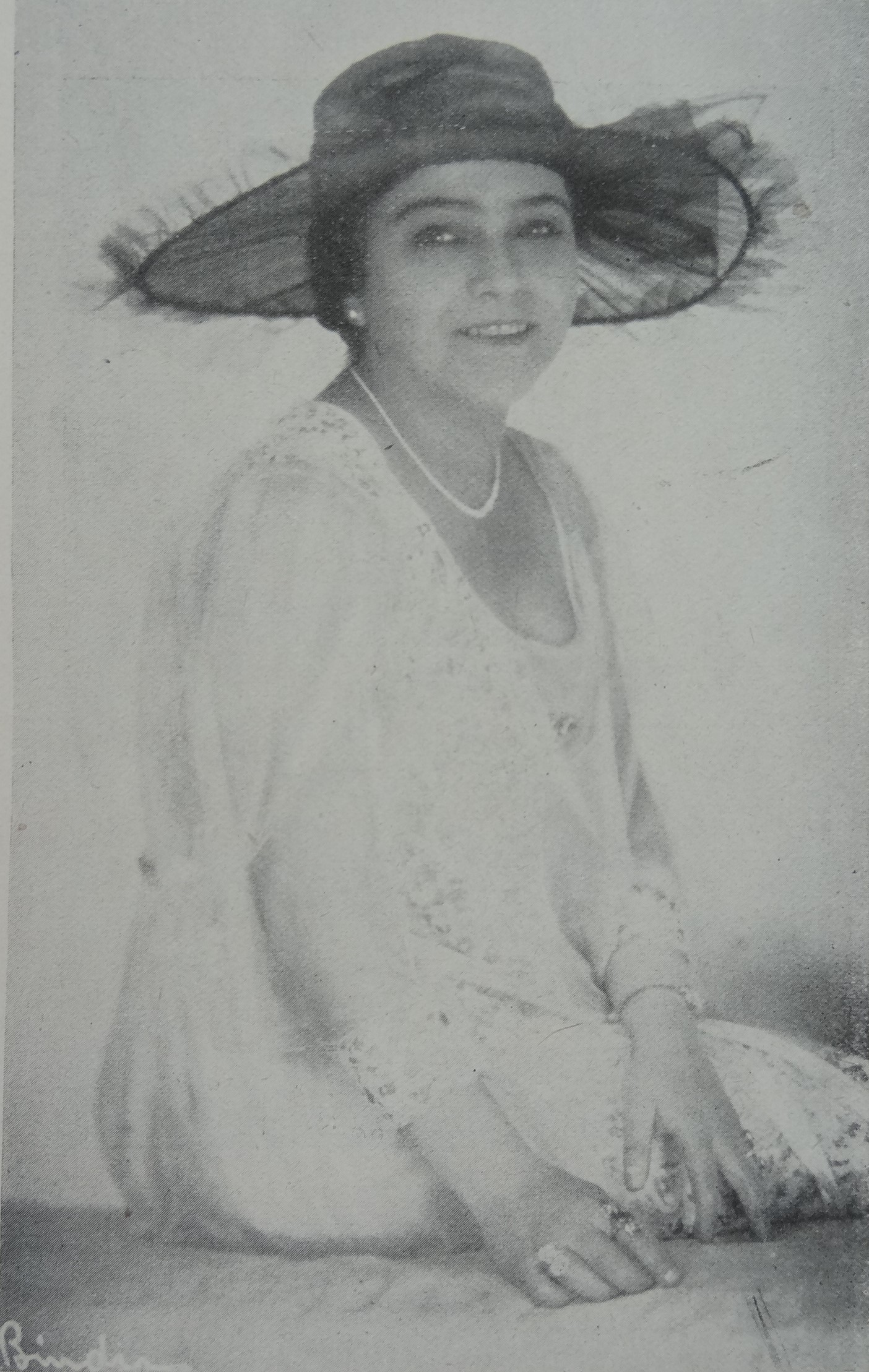
- Ly c. 1920
- Born: Grethe Lichtenstein; Beuthen
- Occupations: actress; film producer
- Years active: 1908-1921

Grete Ly (October 20, 1885 as Grethe Lichtenstein in Beuthen - April 1, 1942 in Kaindorf an der Sulm, Austria) was a German soubrette, theater and silent film actress and film producer.

== Life and work ==
The daughter of the merchant Siegfried Lichtenstein and his wife Johanna, née. Steinitz, began her stage career in 1908 at the newly built Stadttheater in Katowice. In 1910, she worked at Berlin theaters, from 1911 in Vienna at the theater and in operetta. From 1918, she appeared in front of the camera for several films, some of which she produced herself with the Grete Ly Film-Gesellschaft Reß & Berger OHG (from December 1920: Grete Ly Film-Gesellschaft Grete Reß). Already at the beginning of the 1920s, she largely withdrew into private life. Presumably in connection with repressions that threatened her because of her Jewish descent, she committed suicide in 1942.

Grete Ly was married four times: from 1910 to 1911 to the actor Richard Großmann, from 1913 to 1921 to the lawyer Ernst Reß, then from 1923 to 1925 to the banker Julius Feige and finally from 1926 until her death to the Major Gustav del Cott.

== Filmography ==
- 1918: Die schöne Risette (actress)
- 1919: Menschen (actress and producer)
- 1919: Todesurteil (actress and producer)
- 1920: Dieb und Weib (actress and producer)
- 1920: Sturm (actress and producer)
- 1921: Die Ratten (producer)

== Literature ==
- Rainer E. Lotz: German Ragtime & Prehistory of Jazz. Volume 1: The Sound Documents. Storyville Publications, Chigwell 1985, ISBN 0-902391-08-9, p. 38.
- Paul Möhring: Das andere St. Pauli. Cultural history of the Reeperbahn. Matari Verlag, Hamburg 1965, p. 75.
- Victor Neuenberg (ed.): Film-Magazin. Reinhold Kühn, Berlin 1920, p. 525.
- Neuer Theater-Almanach. Theater historical yearbook and address book. Vol. 25, 1914, ZDB-ID 502265-4, p. 689.
