= Richard Ludwig =

German rugby union player

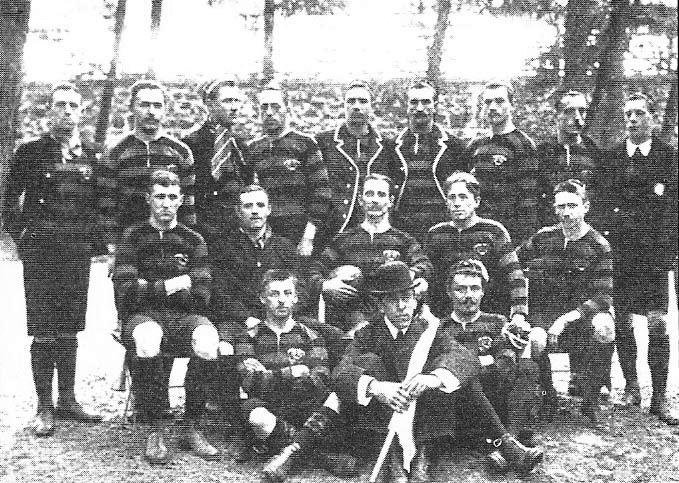
- Germany, represented by FC 1880 Frankfurt, at the 1900 Summer Olympics
- Born: Richard Ludwig; 22 May 1877 Frankfurt, German Empire
- Died: 10 August 1946 (aged 69) Königstein im Taunus, Allied-occupied Germany

Rugby union career
- Position: Flanker
Amateur team(s)
Years	Team	Apps	(Points)
- FC 1880 Frankfurt
Medal record
Men's rugby union
Representing Germany
Olympic Games
Silver medal – second place	1900 Paris	Team competition

Richard Ludwig (22 May 1877 – 10 August 1946) was a German rugby union player who competed in the 1900 Summer Olympics. He was a member of the German rugby union team, which won the silver medal. Germany was represented at the tournament by the FC 1880 Frankfurt rather than an official national team. He is the brother of Erich Ludwig, who also played at the 1900 tournament.
