= Walking Back into the Past =

1954 film

- Directed by: Karl Hartl
- Written by: Emil Burri; Johannes Mario Simmel
- Based on: Die Forelle by Wilfried Christensen
- Produced by: Paula Wessely
- Starring: Paula Wessely; Attila Hörbiger; Josef Meinrad
- Cinematography: Konstantin Irmen-Tschet
- Edited by: Henny Brünsch
- Music by: Willy Schmidt-Gentner
- Production company: Paula Wessely Filmproduktion
- Distributed by: Sascha Film; Deutsche London Film (Germany)
- Release date: 20 December 1954
- Running time: 90 minutes
- Country: Austria
- Language: German

Walking Back into the Past (German: Weg in die Vergangenheit) is a 1954 Austrian drama film directed by Karl Hartl and starring Paula Wessely, Attila Hörbiger and Josef Meinrad.

It was shot at the Thalerhof Studios in Graz and on location in Vienna. The film's sets were designed by the art director Werner Schlichting.

== Cast ==
- Paula Wessely as Gabriele Gärtner
- Attila Hörbiger as Berthold Gärtner
- Josef Meinrad as Franz Nägele
- Willi Forst as Clemens Monti
- Willy Fritsch as Werner Schrey
- Rudolf Fernau as Stefan Berg
- Maria Holst as Adrienne Monti
- Karl Ehmann as Pokorny
- Rose Renée Roth as Olga
- Heribert Meisel as Reporter

== Bibliography ==
- Fritsche, Maria. Homemade Men in Postwar Austrian Cinema: Nationhood, Genre and Masculinity. Berghahn Books, 2013.
