= Lehartheater =

Theatre in Bad Ischl, Austria

Coordinates: 47°42′47″N 13°37′19″E

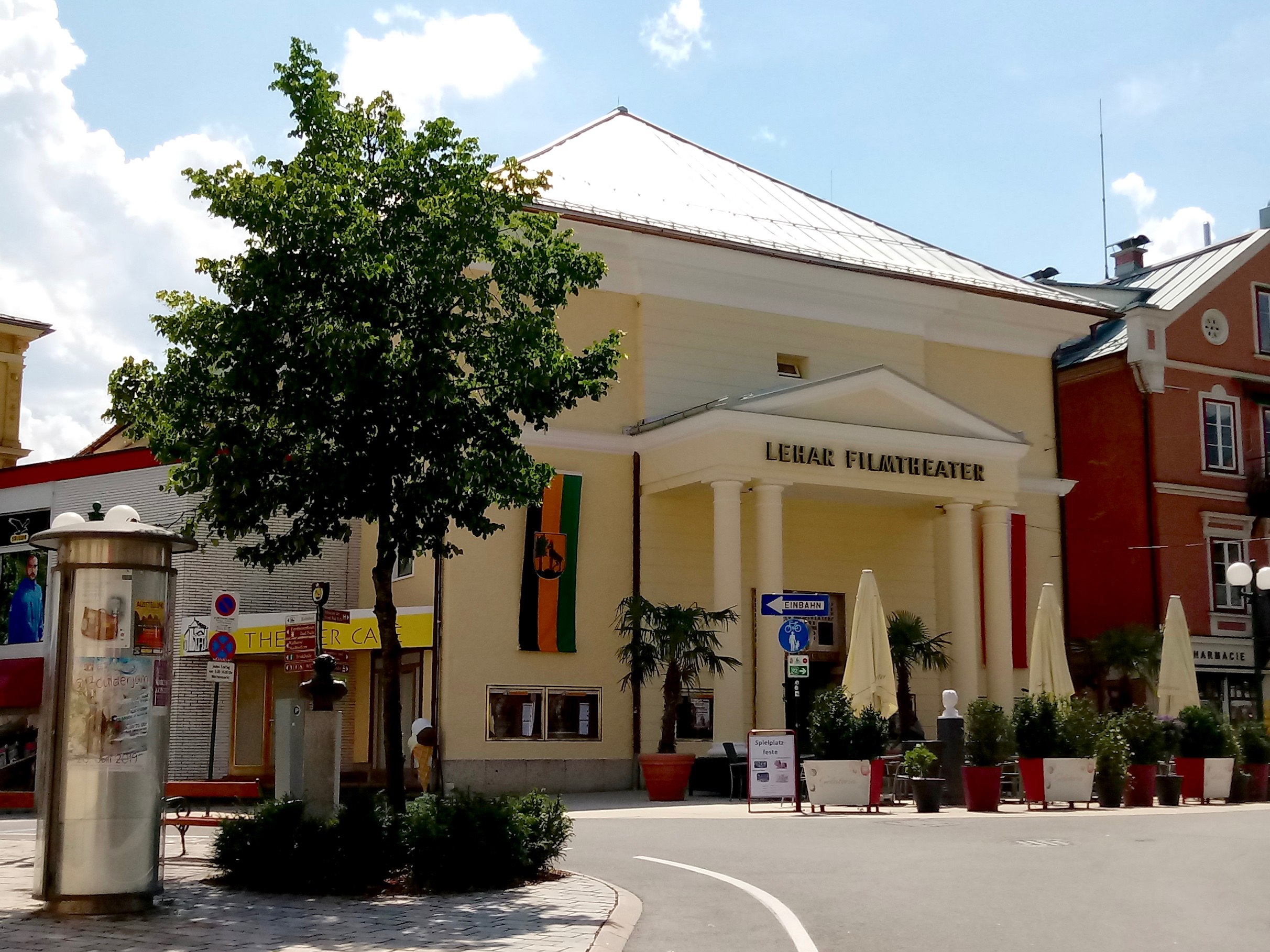
Lehartheater

Lehartheater is a theatre in Austria.
