= Karl May (film) =

1974 film

- Directed by: Hans-Jürgen Syberberg
- Screenplay by: Hans-Jürgen Syberberg
- Produced by: Hans Jürgen Syberberg
- Starring: Helmut Käutner; Kristina Söderbaum; Käthe Gold
- Cinematography: Dietrich Lohmann
- Edited by: Ingrid Broszat; Annette Dorn
- Music by: Eugen Thomass
- Production company: TMS Film
- Distributed by: Warner-Columbia Filmverleih
- Release date: 18 October 1974
- Running time: 187 minutes
- Country: West Germany
- Language: German
- Budget: DM 1.1 million

Karl May is a 1974 West German biographical drama film directed by Hans-Jürgen Syberberg, starring Helmut Käutner as the writer Karl May. It is considered the second part in Syberberg's "German trilogy", preceded by Ludwig: Requiem for a Virgin King from 1972 and succeeded by Hitler: A Film from Germany from 1977.

It was shot at the Bavaria Studios in Munich with sets designed by Nino Borghi. Location shooting took place in Vienna from 4 April to 17 May 1974. The budget was 1.1 million Deutsche Mark, of which the broadcaster ZDF provided 700,000 Mark.

== Partial cast ==
- Helmut Käutner as Karl May
- Kristina Söderbaum as Emma
- Käthe Gold as Klara
- Attila Hörbiger as Dittrich, Militär-Schriftsteller
- Willy Trenk-Trebitsch as Lebius, Journalist
- Mady Rahl as Pauline Münchmeyer
- Lil Dagover as Bertha von Suttner
- Rudolf Prack as Sächsischer Justizminister
- Rainer von Artenfels as Young Hitler
- Leon Askin as Anwalt Klotz-Sello
- Harry Hardt as Wessel von Charlottenburg
- Fritz von Friedl as Larrass

== Bibliography ==
- Bock, Hans-Michael; Bergfelder, Tim, eds. (2009). The Concise Cinegraph: Encyclopaedia of German Cinema. New York: Berghahn Books. ISBN 978-1-57181-655-9.
