= Gustav Renker =

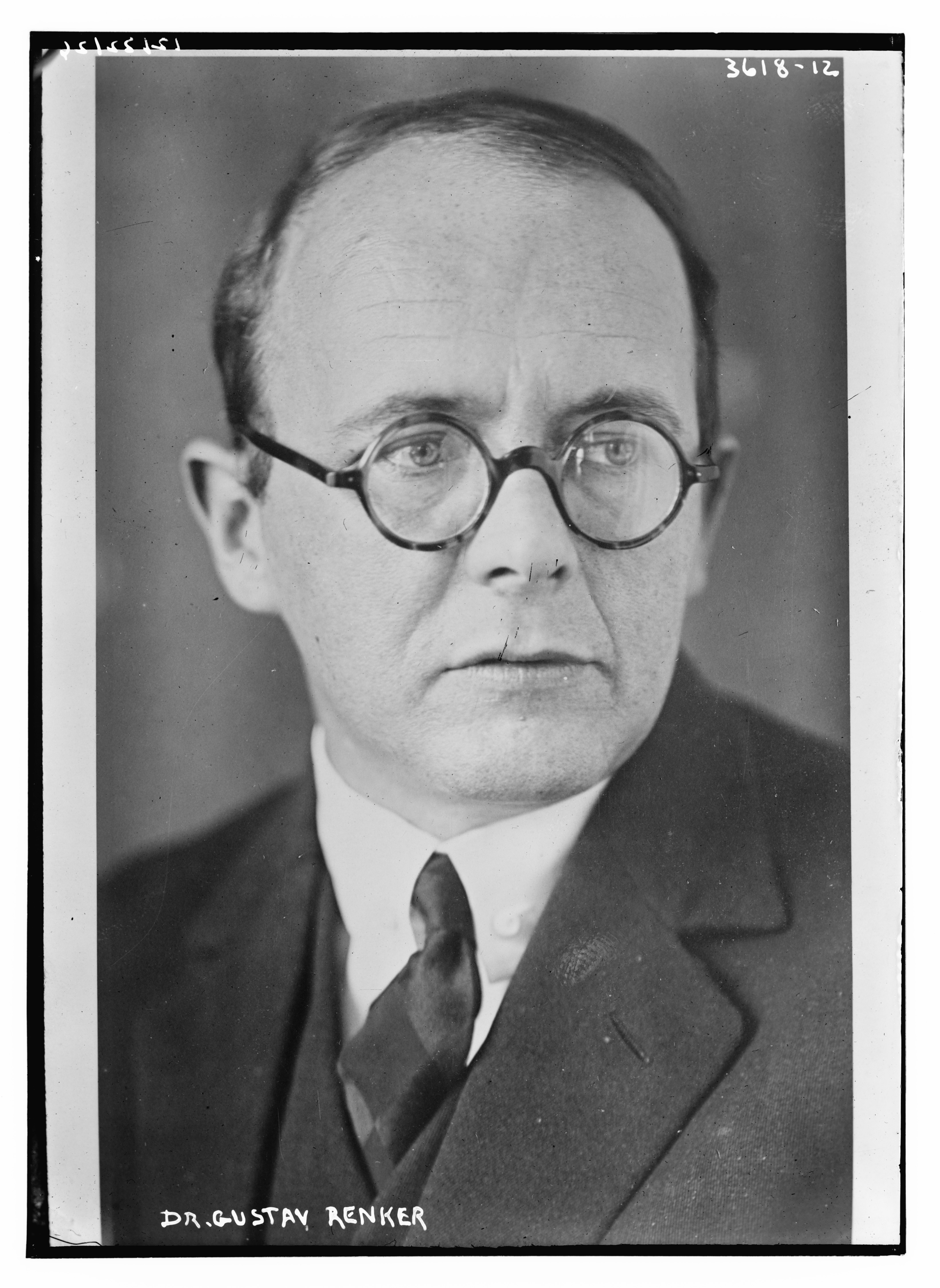
- Born: 12 October 1889; Vienna
- Died: 23 July 1967 (aged 77); Langnau im Emmental, Switzerland
- Occupations: Journalist, author
- Writing career
- Genre: literary regionalism

Gustav Renker (12 October 1889 – 23 July 1967) was an Austrian and Swiss journalist and novelist known for his literary regionalism.

Renker has published over sixty novels, some of which have been made into films. His work is mostly attributable to the anti-modern province literature of the interwar period.

He was the father in law of Heinrich Sutermeister. Part of his literary estate is archived in the Carinthian literary archives in Klagenfurt.
