= Anna Exl =

Austrian actress

- Born: Anna Gstöttner; 2 September 1882; Innsbruck, County of Tyrol, Austro-Hungarian Empire
- Died: 15 November 1969 (aged 87); Innsbruck, Austria
- Occupation: Actress
- Years active: 1913-1958 (film)

Anna Exl (born Anna Gstöttner; 2 September 1882 – 15 November 1969) was an Austrian stage and film actress. She was married to the actor Ferdinand Exl, with whom she had a daughter Ilse. Her younger sister Mimi Gstöttner-Auer was also an actress.

== Selected filmography ==
- The Vulture Wally (1940)
- Earth (1947)
- Ulli and Marei (1948)
- Veronika the Maid (1951)
- Road to Home (1952)

== Bibliography ==
- Fritsche, Maria. Homemade Men in Postwar Austrian Cinema: Nationhood, Genre and Masculinity. Berghahn Books, 2013.
