= Ferdinand Exl =

Austrian actor

- Born: 27 August 1875; Innsbruck, Austria-Hungary
- Died: 28 October 1942 (aged 67); Innsbruck, Nazi Germany
- Occupation: Actor
- Years active: 1913-1941 (film)

Ferdinand Exl (1875–1942) was an Austrian stage and film actor. He was married to the actress Anna Exl, with whom they had a daughter Ilse Exl who also took up acting.

== Selected filmography ==
- The Fire Devil (1940)

== Bibliography ==
- W. E. Yates. Theatre in Vienna: A Critical History, 1776-1995. Cambridge University Press, 2005.
