= Vojka, Slovakia =

Municipality of Slovakia

Vojka Véke
- Municipality
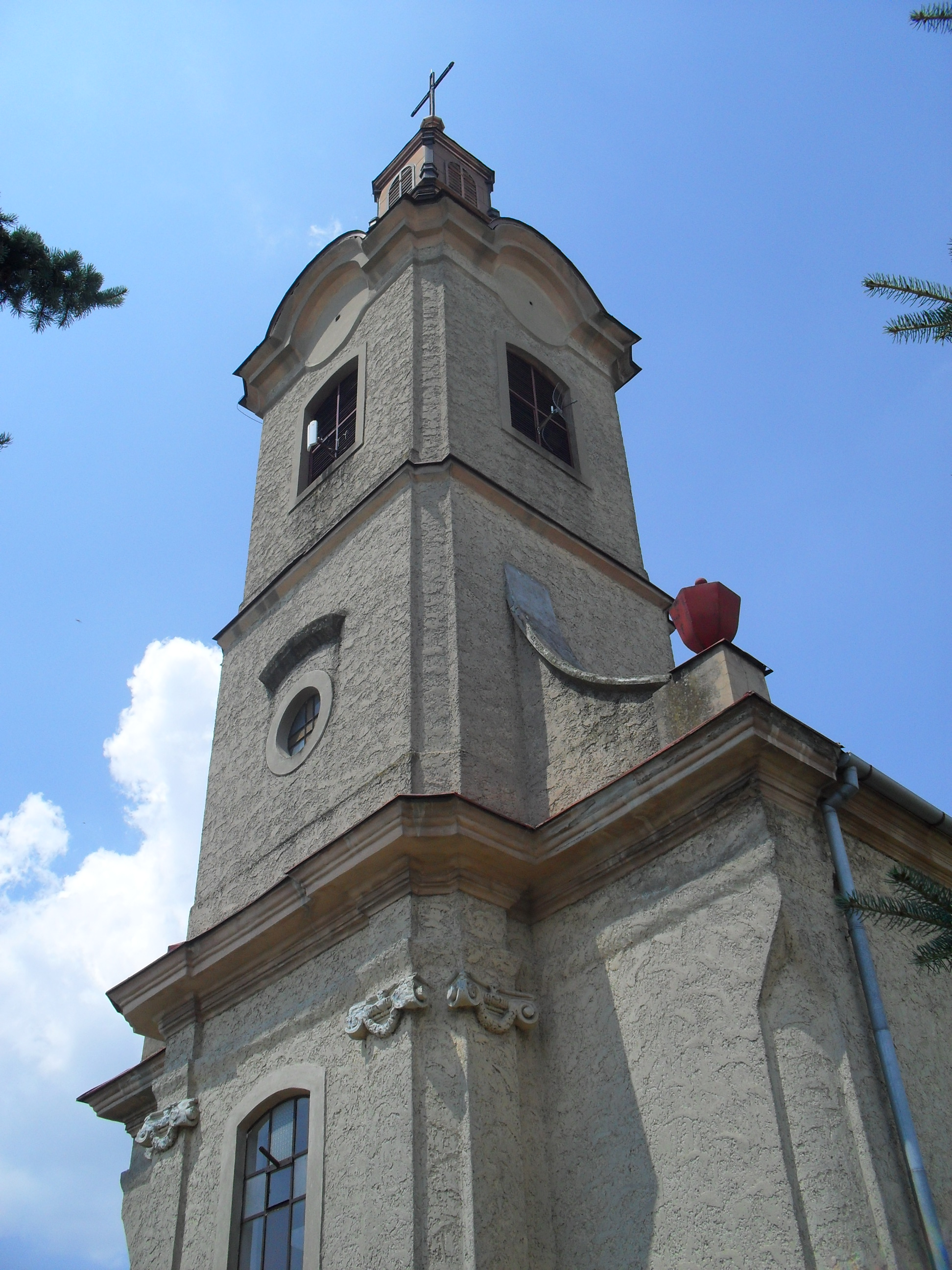
- Vojka Catholic Church

- Flag Coat of arms

- Location of Vojka in the Košice Region Location of Vojka in Slovakia
- Coordinates: 48.47°N 21.92°E
- Country: Slovakia
- Region: Košice Region
- District: Trebišov District
- First mentioned: 1245

Area
  - Total: 8.73 km^{2} (3.37 sq mi)
- Elevation: 105 m (344 ft)

Population (2025)
  - Total: 557
- Time zone: UTC+1 (CET)
  - Summer (DST): UTC+2 (CEST)
- Postal code: 768 3
- Area code: +421 56
- Vehicle registration plate (until 2022): TV
- Website: www.vojka.eu

Vojka (Hungarian: Véke) is a village and municipality in the Trebišov District in the Košice Region of eastern Slovakia.

== Geography ==
The municipality lies at an altitude of 105 metres (344 ft) and covers an area of 8.73 km^{2} (3.37 sq mi) (2025).

== Etymology ==
The name comes from Slavic vojka, 'a small guardian group'. Rudolf Krajčovič assumes that it guarded the nearby salt storage in Soľnička.

== Population ==
Population statistic (10 years)
Year	1995	2005	2015	2025
Count	396	516	490	557
Difference		+30.30%	−5.03%	+13.67%

Population statistic
Year	2024	2025
Count	556	557
Difference		+0.17%

It has a population of 557 people (31 December 2025).

=== Ethnicity ===
Census 2021 (1+ %)
Ethnicity	Number	Fraction
Hungarian	363	70.07%
Slovak	170	32.81%
Romani	75	14.47%
Not found out	13	2.5%
Total	518	

In year 2021 was 518 people by ethnicity 363 as Hungarian, 170 as Slovak, 75 as Romani, 13 as Not found out, 5 as Czech, 2 as Other and 1 as Albanian.

Note on population: The difference values of population numbers in the table "Population statistic" and in the sections "Ethnicity" & "Religion" is caused by the use of various statistical methods.

=== Religion ===
Census 2021 (1+ %)
Religion	Number	Fraction
Roman Catholic Church	316	61%
Calvinist Church	81	15.64%
None	67	12.93%
Greek Catholic Church	27	5.21%
Not found out	13	2.51%
Jehovah's Witnesses	8	1.54%
Total	518	

In year 2021 was 518 people by religion 316 from Roman Catholic Church, 81 from Calvinist Church, 67 from None, 27 from Greek Catholic Church, 13 from Not found out, 8 from Jehovah's Witnesses, 3 from Eastern Orthodox Church, 2 from Evangelical Church and 1 from Old Catholic Church.
