= Ilse Exl =

Austrian actress

- Born: November 26, 1907; Innsbruck, Austro-Hungarian Empire
- Died: July 8, 1956 (aged 48); Innsbruck, Austria
- Occupation: Actress
- Years active: 1941—1951
- Parents: Ferdinand Exl; Anna Exl

Ilse Exl (November 26, 1907 — July 8, 1956) was an Austrian stage and film actress. She was the daughter of the actors Anna Exl and Ferdinand Exl.

== Selected filmography ==
- Lightning Around Barbara (1941)
- Earth (1947)
- Ulli and Marei (1948)
- Veronika the Maid (1951)

== Bibliography ==
- Fritsche, Maria. Homemade Men in Postwar Austrian Cinema: Nationhood, Genre and Masculinity. Berghahn Books, 2013.
