= List of German films of 1943 =

This is a list of the most notable films produced in the Cinema of Germany in 1943.

== A–L ==
Title	Director	Cast	Genre	Notes
Back Then	Rolf Hansen	Zarah Leander, Hans Stüwe, Rossano Brazzi	Drama	Damals
Beloved Darling	Paul Martin	Johannes Riemann, Dorit Kreysler, Sonja Ziemann	Comedy	
The Bath in the Barn	Volker von Collande	Heli Finkenzeller, Gisela von Collande, Richard Häussler, Will Dohm	Comedy	Das Bad auf der Tenne; In Agfacolor
The Big Number	Karl Anton	Leny Marenbach, Maly Delschaft, Paul Hoffmann	Drama	
Bravo Acrobat!	Wolfgang Staudte	Charlie Rivel, Clara Tabody, Karl Schönböck	Comedy	
Carnival of Love	Paul Martin	Johannes Heesters, Dora Komar, Hans Moser, Dorit Kreysler.	Comedy	
Circus Renz	Arthur Maria Rabenalt	René Deltgen, Paul Klinger	Drama	
The Crew of the Dora	Karl Ritter	Hannes Stelzer	War	Besatzung Dora
The Dark Day	Géza von Bolváry	Marte Harell, Willy Birgel, Ewald Balser	Drama	
Don't Talk to Me About Love	Erich Engel	Heidemarie Hatheyer, Mathias Wieman, Hilde Sessak	Romance	
The Eternal Tone	Günther Rittau	Elfriede Datzig, Rudolf Prack, Olga Chekhova	Drama	
A Flea in Her Ear	Paul Heidemann	Lotte Rausch, Sabine Peters, Edith Oß	Comedy	
Gabriele Dambrone	Hans Steinhoff	Gusti Huber, Siegfried Breuer, Christl Mardayn	Drama	
Germanin	Max W. Kimmich	Peter Petersen, Luis Trenker, Lotte Koch	Adventure	
The Golden Spider	Erich Engels	Kirsten Heiberg, Harald Paulsen, Jutta Freybe, Otto Gebühr	Spy drama	Die goldene Spinne
Heaven, We Inherit a Castle	Peter Paul Brauer	Anny Ondra, Hans Brausewetter	Comedy	
I Entrust My Wife to You	Kurt Hoffmann	Heinz Rühmann	Comedy	Ich vertraue Dir meine Frau an
Immensee	Veit Harlan	Kristina Söderbaum, Carl Raddatz, Paul Klinger	Drama	In Agfacolor
Johann	Robert A. Stemmle	Theo Lingen, Fita Benkhoff, Irene von Meyendorff	Comedy	
Journey into the Past	Hans H. Zerlett	Olga Tschechowa, Ferdinand Marian, Margot Hielscher	Drama	
Kohlhiesel's Daughters	Kurt Hoffmann	Eduard Köck, Heli Finkenzeller, Oskar Sima	Comedy	
Late Love	Gustav Ucicky	Paula Wessely, Attila Hörbiger, Inge List	Drama	
Laugh Bajazzo	Leopold Hainisch	Paul Hörbiger, Claude Farell, Dagny Servaes	Drama	
Liebeskomödie	Theo Lingen	Magda Schneider	Comedy	Love Comedy
Light of Heart	Carl Boese	Hans Nielsen, Carola Höhn, Werner Fuetterer	Comedy	
Love Premiere	Arthur Maria Rabenalt	Hans Söhnker, Kirsten Heiberg	Drama	

== M–Z ==
Title	Director	Cast	Genre	Notes
A Man with Principles?	Géza von Bolváry	Hans Söhnker, Elfie Mayerhofer	Comedy	
Mask in Blue	Paul Martin	Clara Tabody, Wolf Albach-Retty, Hans Moser	Musical	
The Master of the Estate	Hans Deppe	Willy Birgel, Viktoria von Ballasko, Anneliese Uhlig	Drama	
Melody of a Great City	Wolfgang Liebeneiner	Hilde Krahl, Werner Hinz	Musical	
Münchhausen	Josef von Báky	Hans Albers, Ilse Werner, Brigitte Horney, Ferdinand Marian	Adventure / Fantasy	In Agfacolor, celebrating the 25th anniversary of the Ufa with impressive special effects
My Summer Companion	Fritz Peter Buch	Anna Dammann, Paul Hartmann, Wolfgang Lukschy	Romance	
An Old Heart Becomes Young Again	Erich Engel	Emil Jannings, Maria Landrock, Viktor de Kowa	Comedy	
Paracelsus	Georg Wilhelm Pabst	Werner Krauss, Mathias Wieman	Drama	
Romance in a Minor Key	Helmut Käutner	Marianne Hoppe, Paul Dahlke, Ferdinand Marian	Drama	Romanze in Moll; Based on a story by Guy de Maupassant
A Salzburg Comedy	Hans Deppe	Willy Fritsch, Hertha Feiler	Comedy	Der Kleine Grenzverkehr; Based on a short story by Erich Kästner
The Second Shot	Martin Frič	Gustav Waldau, Susi Nicoletti, Hana Vítová	Drama	
Sophienlund	Heinz Rühmann	Harry Liedtke, Käthe Haack, Hannelore Schroth	Comedy	
Tonelli	Victor Tourjansky	Ferdinand Marian, Winnie Markus, Mady Rahl	Drama	
Titanic	Werner Klingler and Herbert Selpin	Sybille Schmitz, Hans Nielsen, Kirsten Heiberg,	Propaganda	Disaster film casting a fictitious German officer on the RMS Titanic as the hero and the British as villains.
A Waltz with You	Hubert Marischka	Lizzi Waldmüller, Albert Matterstock, Grethe Weiser	Musical comedy	
When the Young Wine Blossoms	Fritz Kirchhoff	Henny Porten, Otto Gebühr	Comedy	
The White Dream	Géza von Cziffra	Olly Holzmann, Elfriede Datzig, Wolf Albach-Retty	Musical comedy	
Wild Bird	Johannes Meyer	Leny Marenbach, Volker von Collande	Romance	
Die Wirtin zum Weißen Rößl	Karl Anton	Leny Marenbach, Dorit Kreysler, Karl Schönböck	Musical comedy	
Women Are No Angels	Willi Forst	Marte Harell, Axel von Ambesser, Margot Hielscher, Curd Jürgens	Comedy	Frauen sind keine Engel

== Documentaries ==
Title	Director	Cast	Genre	Notes
Alltag zwischen Zechentürmen	Leo de Laforgue			15 minute documentary
Asse zur See - Ein Filmbericht von unseren Schnellbooten	Hermann Stöß		Documentary	Available online here
Buntes Leben in der Tiefe	Ulrich K.T. Schultz		Documentary	
Deutschland - Italien - Ungarn. Ein Boxländerkampf im Kriegsjahr 1942				Germany-Italy-Hungary. Boxing Championships in war year 1942
Eupen-Malmedy wieder im Reich			Documentary	Available online here
Fleischfressende Pflanzen	Ulrich K.T. Schultz		Documentary	
Friedliche Jagd mit der Farbenkamera	Ulrich K.T. Schultz		Documentary	
Geheimnis Tibet	H.A. Lettow, Ernst Schäfer			Secretive Tibet; documentary about SS expedition to Tibet; aka Lhasa-Lo - Die verbotene Stadt - Lhasa-Lo - The Lost City
Josef Thorak, Werkstatt und Werk	Hans Cürlis and Arnold Fanck	Josef Thorak	documentary	Available online here
Juden in Dombrova	Fritz Hippler		documentary	
Küchenzauber	Martin Rikli, Paul Steindel		documentary	
Prager Barock	Karel Plicka		documentary	
Schulgymnastik für Mädchen 6- bis 9jährig			Documentary	
Schulgymnastik für Mädchen 12- bis 16jährig			Documentary	
Warnfarben und Tarnfarben	Ulrich K.T. Schultz		Documentary	
Wolkenspiel	Martin Rikli		Documentary	
Junker der Waffen-SS				Young Men of the Armed SS Available online here

== Short films ==
Title	Director	Cast	Genre	Notes
Armer Hansi	Frank Leberecht		animation	
Dornröschen	Ferdinand Diehl		animation	
Männer gegen Panzer				Men Against Tanks
Hochzeit im Korallenmeer	Horst von Möllendorff		animation	Made by Czechs in occupied Prague
Strich-Punkt-Ballett	Herbert Seggelke		animation	
Verwitterte Melodie	Hans Fischerkoesen		Animation	Weather-beaten Melody
