= List of German films of 1944 =

This is a list of the most notable films produced in the Cinema of Germany in 1944.

== Films by genre ==
=== Dramatic features ===
1. Am Abend nach der Oper
2. Aufruhr der Herzen
3. The Black Robe
4. Der blaue Schleier
5. Ein Blick zurück
6. The Buchholz Family
7. Das war mein Leben
8. The Degenhardts
9. Dreaming
10. The Enchanted Day
11. Der Engel mit dem Saitenspiel
12. Es fing so harmlos an
13. Es lebe die Liebe
14. Die Feuerzangenbowle
15. The Woman of My Dreams
16. Große Freiheit Nr. 7
17. I Need You
18. Ich habe von dir geträumt
19. Junge Adler
20. Der kleine Muck
21. Eine kleine Sommermelodie
22. Der Mann, dem man den Namen stahl
23. Marriage of Affection
24. The Master Detective
25. Nora
26. Opfergang
27. Orient Express
28. The Roedern Affair
29. Schrammeln
30. Ein schöner Tag
31. The Wedding Hotel

=== Documentary features ===
1. "12 Minuten" plaudert in Zahlen
2. Achtung! Ratten!
3. Ackerbodenbearbeitung
4. Alltag in Barcelona
5. Amerikanische Brandbomben, ihre Wirkung und Bekämpfung
6. Antilopen der Berge
7. Die Arbeitsverfahren der Keramchemie
8. Atlantik-Wall
9. Aufheben, Lagern und Tragen Verletzter
10. Aus der Zaubertruhe des Films
11. Brandenburg-Preussen, Potsdam
12. Britische Brandbomben, ihre Wirkung und Bekämpfung. 5. Folge: Die britische Flammstrahl-Bombe
13. Bucher Gülle - Pumpanlage
14. Der Bussard
15. Großmarkthalle
16. Der Karpfen
17. Richtiges Tragen von Lasten
18. Scharfschütze in der Geländeausbildung
19. Theresienstadt:Der Führer schenkt den Juden eine Stadt
20. Verrater vor den Volksgericht
21. Vom Einsatz der Ordnungspolizei in allen Fronten des Krieges
22. Der Wille zum Leben
23. Ziegen und Lämmer

=== Documentary shorts ===
1. Arno Breker – Harte Zeit, starke Kunst
2. Aus Spiel wird Ernst
3. Die Batteriezündung
4. Beerenobstpflanzung und Schnitt
5. Der Bergbach
6. Bergnot
7. Bilder aus Finnland
8. Bilder von Japans Küsten
9. Die bildspendende Flüssigkeit
10. Biscaya südwärts
11. Bodenbearbeitung im Garten
12. Kindergymnastik

=== Animation shorts ===
1. Die Abenteuer des Freiherrn von Münchhausen
2. Das dumme Gänslein
3. Die goldene Gans
4. Purzelbaum ins Leben
5. Der Schneemann

Title	Director	Cast	Genre	Notes
"12 Minuten" plaudert in Zahlen			documentary	"12 minutes" chatting in numbers
Am Abend nach der Oper	Arthur Maria Rabenalt	Gusti Huber, Siegfried Breuer, Robert Lindner		"In the evening after the opera"
Achtung! Ratten!	Eugen von Bongardt		documentary	
Die Abenteuer des Freiherrn von Münchhausen	Hans Held		Animation	
Ackerbodenbearbeitung			documentary	
Alltag in Barcelona			documentary	
Amerikanische Brandbomben, ihre Wirkung und Bekämpfung			documentary	"American fire bombs, their effect and combat"
Antilopen der Berge			documentary	"Antelopes of the mountains"
Die Arbeitsverfahren der Keramchemie			documentary	"The working methods of ceramics"
Arno Breker – Harte Zeit, starke Kunst	Hans Cürlis and Arnold Fanck		short documentary	short about Arno Breker; Available online here
Atlantik-Wall	Arnold Fanck		documentary	propaganda film about the Atlantic Wall
Aufheben, Lagern und Tragen Verletzter			documentary	"Lifting, storing and carrying injured persons"
Aufruhr der Herzen	Hans Müller	Lotte Koch, Rudolf Prack, O. E. Hasse		"Riot of hearts", Available online here
Aus der Zaubertruhe des Films			documentary	"From the magic of the film"
Aus Spiel wird Ernst			short documentary	"Out of game becomes serious"
Die Batteriezündung	Hans Ewald		short documentary	
A Beautiful Day	Philipp Lothar Mayring	Gertrud Meyen, Carsta Löck, Sabine Peters	Comedy	
Beerenobstpflanzung und Schnitt			short documentary	
Der Bergbach	Max Zehenthofer		short documentary	
Bergnot	Peter Steigerwald		short documentary	
Bilder aus Finnland			short documentary	"Pictures out of Finland"
Bilder von Japans Küsten	Arnold Fanck		short documentary	"Pictures of Japans Coasts"
Die bildspendende Flüssigkeit	Max Haufler		short documentary	
Biscaya südwärts			short documentary	
The Black Robe	Fritz Peter Buch	Lotte Koch, Richard Häussler	Drama	
Der blaue Schleier			Made in occupied Prague	
Ein Blick zurück	Gerhard Menzel	Rudolf Forster, Hilde Weissner, Thea Weis	Drama	"A look back"
Bodenbearbeitung im Garten	Phil Jutzi		short documentary	"Soil work in the garden"
Brandenburg-Preußen, Potsdam			documentary	
Britische Brandbomben, ihre Wirkung und Bekämpfung. 5. Folge: Die britische Flammstrahl-Bombe			documentary	"British fire bombs, their effect and combat. 5. Episode: The British flame-jet bomb"
The Buchholz Family	Carl Froelich	Henny Porten, Paul Westermeier, Gustav Fröhlich	Drama	
Bucher Gülle - Pumpanlage			documentary	"Bucher manure pumping"
Der Bussard	Walter Hege		documentary	"The Buzzard"
A Cheerful House	Johannes Guter	Carla Rust, Rolf Weih, Hans Leibelt	Comedy	
Come Back to Me	Heinz Paul	Charlott Daudert, Natasa Gollová, Margarete Haagen	Comedy	
Das war mein Leben	Paul Martin	Carl Raddatz		That Was My Life
The Degenhardts	Werner Klingler	Heinrich George, Ernst Schröder	War/Drama	
Dreaming	Harald Braun	Hilde Krahl, Mathias Wieman	Historical musical	
Das dumme Gänslein	Hans Fischerkoesen		Animation	The Silly Little Goose
Dog Days	Géza von Cziffra	Wolf Albach-Retty, Rolf Wanka, Maria Holst	Comedy	
The Enchanted Day	Peter Pewas	Winnie Markus, Hans Stüwe	Romance	
Der Engel mit dem Saitenspiel	Heinz Rühmann	Hertha Feiler, Hans Söhnker, Hans Nielsen		
Es fing so harmlos an	Theo Lingen	Johannes Heesters, Theo Lingen	Comedy	
Es lebe die Liebe	Erich Engel	Johannes Heesters, Lizzi Waldmüller	Musical comedy	
Die Feuerzangenbowle	Helmut Weiss	Heinz Rühmann, Erich Ponto, Paul Henckels	Comedy	comedy with Heinz Rühmann in his most famous role as Hans Pfeiffer "with three fs"
The Woman of My Dreams	Georg Jacoby	Marika Rökk		Woman of My Dreams; In Agfacolor
Die goldene Gans	Lotte Reiniger		Animation	The Golden Goose
The Green Salon	Boleslaw Barlog	Margarete Haagen, Dorothea Wieck	Drama	
Große Freiheit Nr. 7	Helmut Käutner	Hans Albers, Ilse Werner, Hans Söhnker, Hilde Hildebrand, Gustav Knuth, Günther Lüders		Große Freiheit [Great Freedom] is the name of a Hamburg street. Then censored Agfacolor film with Hans Albers
Großmarkthalle	Ulrich Kayser, Georg Wittuhn		Documentary	
Harald Arrives at Nine	Carl Boese	Irene von Meyendorff, Anneliese Uhlig, Werner Fuetterer	Mystery drama	
The Heart Must Be Silent	Gustav Ucicky	Paula Wessely, Mathias Wieman, Werner Hinz	Drama	Wien Film
I Need You	Hans Schweikart	Marianne Hoppe, Willy Birgel	Comedy	
Ich habe von dir geträumt	Wolfgang Staudte			
The Impostor	Karl Anton	Sybille Schmitz, Karl Ludwig Diehl, Will Dohm	Comedy	
Junge Adler	Alfred Weidenmann	Willy Fritsch, Dietmar Schönherr, Hardy Krüger		Young Eagles
Der Karpfen	Ulrich K.T. Schultz		Documentary	
Kindergymnastik	Günter Kulemeyer		Documentary	
Der kleine Muck	Franz Fiedler	Gustav Waldau		
Life Calls	Arthur Maria Rabenalt	Sybille Schmitz, Paul Klinger, Elsa Wagner	Drama	
Eine kleine Sommermelodie	Volker von Collande	Irene von Meyendorff, Curd Jürgens, Sonja Ziemann		A Little Summer Melody
Love Letters	Hans H. Zerlett	Käthe Haack, Hermann Thimig, Paul Hubschmid	Comedy	
Der Mann, dem man den Namen stahl	Wolfgang Staudte			
Marriage of Affection	Carl Froelich	Henny Porten, Marianne Simson	Historical Drama	
The Master Detective	Hubert Marischka	Grethe Weiser, Rudolf Platte	Comedy	
Melusine	Hans Steinhoff	Olga Chekhova, Siegfried Breuer, Angelika Hauff	Drama	
Music in Salzburg	Herbert Maisch	Willy Birgel, Lil Dagover, Hans Nielsen	Comedy	
Nora	Harald Braun	Luise Ullrich, Viktor Staal	Historical Drama	
Opfergang	Veit Harlan	Kristina Söderbaum, Carl Raddatz, Irene von Meyendorff	Drama	In Agfacolor
Orient Express	Viktor Tourjansky	Paul Dahlke, Siegfried Breuer, Rudolf Prack	Thriller	
Philharmonic	Paul Verhoeven	Eugen Klöpfer, Will Quadflieg, Irene von Meyendorff	Drama	
Purzelbaum ins Leben	Gerhard Fieber		Animation	
Richtiges Tragen von Lasten	Phil Jutzi		Documentary	
The Roedern Affair	Erich Waschneck	Paul Hartmann, Annelies Reinhold, Rudolf Fernau	Historical drama	Available online here
Scharfschütze in der Geländeausbildung				Sniper training film
Der Schneemann	Hans Fischerkoesen		Animation	The Snowman; In Agfacolor
Schrammeln	Géza von Bolváry	Marte Harell, Hans Holt, Hans Moser, Paul Hörbiger		
Ein schöner Tag	Philipp Lothar Mayring	Gertrud Meyen, Volker von Collande, Günther Lüders		A Beautiful Day
The Song of the Nightingale	Theo Lingen	Elfie Mayerhofer, Johannes Riemann, Paul Kemp	Drama	
Summer Nights	Karl Ritter	René Deltgen, Suse Graf, Ernst von Klipstein	Comedy	
That Was My Life	Paul Martin	Carl Raddatz, Hansi Knoteck, Leny Marenbach	Drama	
Theresienstadt:Der Führer schenkt den Juden eine Stadt	Kurt Gerron			Propaganda film about how "well" the Jews were treated in concentration camps subtitled: The Fuhrer Gives the Jews a City
Verrater vor den Volksgericht				Trial of the July 20 plotters
Vom Einsatz der Ordnungspolizei in allen Fronten des Krieges				On the Action of the Order Police in All Fronts of the War
The Wedding Hotel	Carl Boese	Karin Hardt, René Deltgen	Comedy	
Why Are You Lying, Elisabeth?	Fritz Kirchhoff	Carola Höhn, Paul Richter, Annie Rosar	Comedy	
A Wife for Three Days	Fritz Kirchhoff	Hannelore Schroth, Carl Raddatz, Ursula Herking	Romance	
Der Wille zum Leben	Ulrich Kayser, Georg Wittuhn		Documentary	
Ziegen und Lämmer			Documentary	
