= 1944 in animation =

Events in 1944 in animation.

== Events ==
=== January ===
- January 4: Friz Freleng's Bugs Bunny short Little Red Riding Rabbit premieres, produced by Leon Schlesinger Productions.
- January 8: Bob Clampett's Bugs Bunny short What's Cookin' Doc? premieres, produced by Leon Schlesinger Productions, in which Bugs competes for an Academy Award for Best Actor.
- January 28: Jack Kinney's Goofy cartoon How to Be a Sailor premieres, produced by the Walt Disney Company.

=== February ===
- February 3: Hans Fischerkoesen's Der Schneemann premieres.
- February 10: Hanna-Barbera's Tom and Jerry cartoon The Zoot Cat premieres, produced by MGM's Cartoon Studio and also starring Toots.
- February 12: Chuck Jones' Daffy Duck and Porky Pig cartoon Tom Turk and Daffy premieres, produced by Leon Schlesinger Productions.
- February 18: Jack King's Donald Duck cartoon Trombone Trouble, produced by Walt Disney Animation Studios, premieres.
- February 26: Chuck Jones' Bugs Bunny and the Three Bears premieres, produced by Leon Schlesinger Productions, which marks the debut of The Three Bears.

=== March ===
- March 2: 16th Academy Awards:
  - Hanna-Barbera's Tom and Jerry short The Yankee Doodle Mouse, produced by MGM, wins the Academy Award for Best Animated Short, the first of seven Oscars the franchise will win over the years.
  - George Pal wins the Academy Honorary Award.
- March 10: Jack Kinney's Goofy short How to Play Golf, produced by Walt Disney Animation Studios, is first released.
- March 25: Chuck Jones' war-time cartoon The Weakly Reporter premieres, produced by Leon Schlesinger Productions.
- March 31: Jack King's Donald Duck cartoon Donald Duck and the Gorilla, produced by Walt Disney Animation Studios, is first released. Also starring Huey, Dewey, and Louie.

=== April ===
- April 1: Tex Avery's Screwball Squirrel premieres, produced by MGM's Cartoon Studio; marks the debut of Screwy Squirrel.
- April 8: Bob Clampett's Porky Pig and Daffy Duck cartoon Tick Tock Tuckered premieres, produced by Leon Schlesinger Productions. It is a remake of the 1937 short Porky's Badtime Story, with Daffy taking Gabby Goat's place.
- April 15: Hanna-Barbera's Tom and Jerry cartoon The Million Dollar Cat premieres, produced by MGM's Cartoon Studio.
- April 21: Jack King's Donald Duck cartoon Contrary Condor, produced by Walt Disney Animation Studios, is first released.
- April 22:
  - Friz Freleng's Bugs Bunny Nips the Nips premieres, produced by Leon Schlesinger Productions, a war propaganda cartoon where Bugs Bunny fights the Imperial Japanese Army.
  - The classic Woody Woodpecker short The Barber of Seville premieres, produced by Walter Lantz Productions.
  - Tex Avery's Batty Baseball premieres, produced by MGM's Cartoon Studio.

=== May ===
- May 6:
  - Frank Tashlin's Porky Pig cartoon Swooner Crooner premieres, produced by Leon Schlesinger Productions. Also starring caricatures of the following famous singers as Roosters: Frank Sinatra, Nelson Eddy, Al Jolson, Jimmy Durante, Cab Calloway, and Bing Crosby.
- May 20: Bob Clampett's Russian Rhapsody premieres, a wartime propaganda short produced by Leon Schlesinger Productions, in which a group of gremlins ridicule Adolf Hitler.
- May 27: Friz Freleng's Daffy Duck and Porky Pig cartoon Duck Soup to Nuts premieres, produced by Leon Schlesinger Productions.

=== June ===
- June 2: Jack King's Donald Duck cartoon Commando Duck premieres, a wartime propaganda cartoon produced by Walt Disney Animation Studios where Donald fights Japanese soldiers.
- June 3: Chuck Jones's Angel Puss premieres, produced by Leon Schlesinger Productions, a one-shot cartoon which will later become part of the Censored Eleven.
- June 17: Friz Freleng's Daffy Duck and Porky Pig cartoon Slightly Daffy premieres, produced by Leon Schlesinger Productions. It is a color remake of Bob Clampett's short Scalp Trouble.
- June 23: Charles Nichols' Springtime for Pluto, produced by the Walt Disney Company, is first released.
- June 24:
  - Tex Avery's Screwy Squirrel cartoon Happy-Go-Nutty, produced by MGM's Cartoon Studio.
  - Bob Clampett's Bugs Bunny cartoon Hare Ribbin' premieres, produced by Leon Schlesinger Productions.

=== July ===
- Hell-Bent for Election is released, a propaganda cartoon directed by Chuck Jones and produced by UPA meant to promote presidential candidate Franklin D. Roosevelt.
- July 1: Leon Schlesinger sells his cartoon studio to Warner Bros. Pictures and is renamed Warner Bros. Cartoons, Inc. Schlesinger also retires and is replaced by Edward Selzer.
- July 13: Hanna-Barbera's Tom and Jerry cartoon The Bodyguard premieres, produced by MGM's Cartoon Studio. This short introduced what Spike's character would become in later shorts in the franchise.
- July 15: Frank Tashlin's final Porky Pig cartoon Brother Brat premieres, produced by Warner Bros. Cartoons.
- July 22: Friz Freleng's Bugs Bunny cartoon Hare Force premieres, produced by Warner Bros. Cartoons.
- July 28: The Puppetoons short film Jasper Goes Hunting premieres which features a cameo by Bugs Bunny.

=== August ===
- August 26: Bob Clampett's Bugs Bunny cartoon Buckaroo Bugs premieres, produced by Warner Bros. Cartoons. This is the final cartoon produced by Leon Schlesinger before he retired and the first Bugs Bunny short to be labeled as Looney Tunes instead of Merrie Melodies.

=== September ===
- September 1: Jack King's Donald Duck cartoon The Plastics Inventor premieres, produced by Walt Disney Animation Studios.
- September 2: Friz Freleng's Goldilocks and the Jivin' Bears, produced by Warner Bros. Cartoons premieres. This is the first WB cartoon not to be produced by Leon Schlesinger.
- September 15: Jack Kinney's Goofy cartoon How to Play Football, produced by the Walt Disney Animation Studios, is first released.
- September 16: Frank Tashlin's war-time propaganda cartoon Plane Daffy is first released, produced by Warner Bros. Cartoons in which Daffy Duck fights a female Nazi spy and fools Adolf Hitler, Joseph Goebbels and Hermann Göring.

=== October ===
- October 21: Tex Avery's Screwy Squirrel cartoon Big Heel-Watha premieres, produced by MGM's Cartoon Studio.
- October 28:
  - Hanna-Barbera's Tom and Jerry cartoon Puttin' On the Dog premieres, produced by MGM's Cartoon Studio and also starring Spike the bulldog.
  - Bob Clampett's Bugs Bunny and Elmer Fudd cartoon The Old Grey Hare premieres, produced by Warner Bros. Cartoons.

=== November ===
- November 3: The Hungarian film Svatba v korálovém moři premieres.
- November 8: Hans Fischerkoesen's Das dumme Gänslein premieres.
- November 23: Hanna-Barbera's Tom and Jerry short Mouse Trouble premieres, produced by MGM's Cartoon Studio.
- November 25: Frank Tashlin's Daffy Duck and Elmer Fudd short The Stupid Cupid premieres, produced by Warner Bros. Cartoons.

=== December ===
- December 8: Jack Hannah's first Donald Duck cartoon Donald's Off Day premieres, produced by Walt Disney Animation Studios. Also starring Huey, Dewey, and Louie.
- December 21: The Walt Disney Company releases The Three Caballeros, directed by Norman Ferguson, Clyde Geronimi, Jack Kinney, Bill Roberts and Harold Young. It marks the debut of Panchito Pistoles. During its initial release, the film was infamous for its depictions of Donald Duck's sexuality towards women. Storyline relations to bestiality were against the regulations of the Hays Office Code at the time. The film would become a cult classic in later years.
- December 30: Friz Freleng's Bugs Bunny and Elmer Fudd cartoon Stage Door Cartoon premieres, produced by Warner Bros. Cartoons.

== Films released ==
- December 21 - The Three Caballeros (United States)

== Births ==
=== January ===
- January 2: Vincent Davis, Australian-American animator (Fred Wolf Films, Gallavants, The Wuzzles), storyboard artist (DIC Entertainment), character designer (The Mouse and His Child), lip sync artist (Camp Candy), sheet timer (Fluppy Dogs, DuckTales, DIC Entertainment, The Mask, Life with Louie, Warner Bros. Animation, Holly Hobbie & Friends), art director (The Real Ghostbusters), production designer (The Mouse and His Child), writer (Cow and Chicken, Grim & Evil), director (Fred Wolf Films, The Little Clowns of Happytown, DuckTales, Captain Planet and the Planeteers, Film Roman) and producer (Garfield and Friends, Cow and Chicken, I Am Weasel, Grim & Evil), (d. 2009).
- January 3: Albert Jelenic, Croatian-born American voice actor and father of Michael Jelenic (voiced himself in the Teen Titans Go! episodes "The Self-Indulgent 200th Episode Spectacular", "The Power of Shrimps", and "Where Exactly on the Globe Is Carl Sanpedro"), (d. 2019).
- January 5: J.R. Horne, American actor (voice of Stan of the Swamp in Wallykazam!, additional voices in Courage the Cowardly Dog), (d. 2016).
- January 10:
  - Frank Sinatra Jr., American singer, songwriter, actor and conductor (voiced himself in the Family Guy episodes "Brian Sings and Swings", "Tales of a Third Grade Nothing" and "Bookie of the Year"), (d. 2016).
  - William Sanderson, American actor (voice of Karl Rossum in Batman: The Animated Series, J.S. Ibsen in Jumanji, Perkalus in the Bravest Warriors episode "Mexican Touchdown").
- January 11: Maciej Damięcki, Polish actor (Polish dub voice of Doc Brown in Back to the Future), (d. 2023).
- January 12: Joe Frazier, American professional boxer (voiced himself in The Simpsons episodes "Brother, Can You Spare Two Dimes?" and "Homer's Paternity Coot"), (d. 2011).
- January 19: Shelley Fabares, American actress (voice of Martha Kent in the DC Animated Universe and Superman: Brainiac Attacks), (d. 2026).
- January 22: Pamela Salem, British actress (voice of the Queen in Hellsing Ultimate), (d. 2024).
- January 28: Bobby Ball, British comic, actor, singer and television host (voice of Wayne the Zebra in the Rex the Runt episode of the same name), (d. 2020).

=== February ===
- February 2: Geoffrey Hughes, English actor (voice of Paul McCartney in Yellow Submarine), (d. 2012).
- February 6: Barry Bruce, American animation director and designer (Will Vinton Studios, Return to Oz, Sesame Street), (d. 2021).
- February 13:
  - Jerry Springer, English-American broadcaster, journalist, actor, producer, and politician (portrayed himself in the Happy! episode "What Smiles Are For", voiced himself in The Simpsons episode "Treehouse of Horror IX"), (d. 2023).
  - Stockard Channing, American actress (voice of Lydia Waterman in The Cleveland Show episode "A Cleveland Brown Christmas", Mrs. Holloway in the King of the Hill episode "The Company Man", first voice of Barbara Gordon in Batman Beyond).
  - Sal Bando, American former professional baseball player (voiced himself in The Simpsons episode "Regarding Margie"), (d. 2023).
- February 18: Anthony Jackson, English actor (voice of Dai Station, Evans the Song, Mr. Dinwiddy in Ivor the Engine, Nug and Mr. Blossom in The Dreamstone), (d. 2006).
- February 19: Donald F. Glut, American writer (Hanna-Barbera, Marvel Productions).
- February 25: Kristina Holland, American actress (voice of April Stewart in The Funky Phantom, Stephanie in Butch Cassidy and the Sundance Kids, Alice Boyle in Wait Till Your Father Gets Home), (d. 2023).
- February 29: Dennis Farina, American actor (voice of Frank Russo in The Looney Tunes Show episode "Daffy Duck, Esquire", Wildcat in the Justice League Unlimited episode "The Cat and the Canary", himself in the Family Guy episode "The Most Interesting Man in the World"), (d. 2013).

=== March ===
- March 16: Granville Van Dusen, American actor (voice of Race Bannon in The New Adventures of Jonny Quest, Jonny's Golden Quest, and Jonny Quest vs. The Cyber Insects, Dash O'Pepper in the Freakazoid! episode "Toby Danger in Doomsday Bet").
- March 24: R. Lee Ermey, American actor and Marine drill instructor (voice of Sarge in the Toy Story franchise, Sky Marshall Sanchez in Roughnecks: Starship Troopers Chronicles, General Thorton in Big Guy and Rusty the Boy Robot, Colonel O'Malley in Recess: School's Out, Jack in Shark Bait, Wildcat in Batman: The Brave and the Bold, General Tsin in Kung Fu Panda: Legends of Awesomeness, Colonel Leslie Hapablap in The Simpsons, General Sims in Kim Possible, Sergeant Goonther in The Angry Beavers episode "Fancy Prance", Sergeant Hobo 678 in the Invader Zim episode "Hobo 13", Madison in the Rocket Power episode "Saving Lt. Ryan", Colonel Thrift in the Fillmore! episode "South of Friendship, North of Honor", Drill Sergeant in The Grim Adventures of Billy & Mandy episode "Here Thar Be Dwarves", Sarge in the My Life as a Teenage Robot episode "Last Action Zero", Bunny in the Father of the Pride episode "One Man's Meat Is Another Man's Girlfriend", Warden in the SpongeBob SquarePants episode "The Inmates of Summer"), (d. 2018).
- March 31: Myfanwy Talog, Welsh actress (voice of narrator in Wil Cwac Cwac, Potholer and Linda in the SuperTed episode "SuperTed and the Pothole Rescues", Princess Amaranth in Alias the Jester, Mrs. Clonkers in The BFG), (d. 1995).

=== April ===
- April 4: Craig T. Nelson, American actor (voice of Mr. Incredible in The Incredibles franchise).
- April 7: Jordi Amorós, Spanish animator (Koki), (d. 2026).
- April 21: Toyoo Ashida, Japanese film director and character designer (Fist of the North Star, Vampire Hunter D, The Mysterious Cities of Gold) and producer (Studio Live), (d. 2011).
- April 29: Michael Angelis, English actor (narrator of Thomas & Friends), (d. 2020).

=== May ===
- May 1: Theresa Plummer-Andrews, English animation television producer (CBBC), (d. 2021).
- May 4:
  - Russi Taylor, American voice actress (voice of Gonzo, Camilla and Robin in Muppet Babies, Huey, Dewey and Louie and Webby Vanderquack in DuckTales, Phantasma in Scooby-Doo and the Ghoul School and the OK K.O.! Let's Be Heroes episode "Monster Party", Martin Prince, Üter, Sherri and Terri in The Simpsons, the title character in Widget, Fernando "Ferny" Toro and Annie Winks in Jakers! The Adventures of Piggley Winks, young Donald Duck in the DuckTales episode "Last Christmas!", continued voice of Minnie Mouse and Pebbles Flintstone), (d. 2019).
  - Walker Boone, Canadian actor (voice of Mario in The Adventures of Super Mario Bros. 3 and Super Mario World, Peppy Wolfman in Totally Spies! The Movie, Farmer in Daisy, A Hen into the Wild), (d. 2021).
- May 5:
  - John Rhys-Davies, Welsh actor (voice of Man Ray in SpongeBob SquarePants, Cassim in Aladdin and the King of Thieves, Macbeth in Gargoyles, Thor in Fantastic Four and The Incredible Hulk, Woolie the Mammoth in Cats Don't Dance, Ranjan's Father in The Jungle Book 2, Galahad in Wizards: Tales of Arcadia, King Hugo in The Legend of Prince Valiant, Charles Brickens in A Flintstones Christmas Carol, Professor Beasthead in the Freakazoid! episode "Tomb of Invisibo", Hades in the Justice League episode "Paradise Lost", Baron Waclaw Jozek in the Batman: The Animated Series episode "The Cape and Cowl Conspiracy", Captain Proteus in the Super Robot Monkey Team Hyperforce Go! episode "Demon of the Deep", Sokwe in The Lion Guard episode "The Lost Gorillas", Tympanni in the Animaniacs episode "Piano Rag").
  - Roger Rees, Welsh actor and director (voice of Rathburn and Lord Theobine in The Legend of Prince Valiant, Prince Malcolm in Gargoyles, Betty in P. J. Sparkles, Edward in Return to Never Land, Ikon in the Phantom 2040 episode "The Sins of the Fathers: Part One", the Piper in the Extreme Ghostbusters episode "The Pied Piper of Manhattan"), (d. 2015).
- May 11: Nigel Lambert: English voice actor (voice of Mr. Curry in The Adventures of Paddington Bear, Sebastian the Raven and Messenger in The Princess and the Pea, Crapoux in Azur & Asmar: The Princes' Quest, Justtice Offers 1, 2 and 3 in Justin and the Knights of Valour), (d. 2024).
- May 12: Vitaly Peskov, Russian caricaturist, illustrator, animator and film director, (d. 2002).
- May 14: George Lucas, American film director, producer, screenwriter, and entrepreneur (Twice Upon a Time, The Land Before Time, Star Wars: The Clone Wars, Strange Magic, voiced himself in Robot Chicken: Star Wars, founder of Industrial Light & Magic).
- May 16: Danny Trejo, American actor (voice of Newtralizer in Teenage Mutant Ninja Turtles, Bane in Young Justice, Stronghold in Minions: The Rise of Gru, Cabrakan in Maya and the Three, Jasper in Storks, El Moco in The Adventures of Puss in Boots, Griswald in Top Cat: The Movie, Wreck and Malice Marauder in Rapunzel's Tangled Adventure, Vasquez in Big City Greens, Tronos in 3Below: Tales of Arcadia, Bobby Daniels in The Ghost and Molly McGee, Venom in the Phineas and Ferb episode "Phineas and Ferb: Mission Marvel", Ram-Man in the Masters of the Universe: Revelation episode "Comes with Everything You See Here").
- May 19: Peter Mayhew, English-American actor (voice of Chewbacca in Star Wars: The Clone Wars), (d. 2019).
- May 25: Frank Oz, American actor, filmmaker, and puppeteer (voice of Yoda in the Star Wars franchise, Jeff Fungus in Monsters, Inc., Subconscious Guard Dave in the Inside Out franchise).
- May 30: Meredith MacRae, American actress (voice of Francine Langstrom in Batman: The Animated Series, Rachel Quest in Jonny's Golden Quest), (d. 2000).

=== June ===
- June 2: Marvin Hamlisch, American composer and conductor (voiced himself in The Simpsons episode "Gone Abie Gone"), (d. 2012).
- June 8: Don Grady, American actor, composer and musician (Jetsons: The Movie, Globehunters: An Around the World in 80 Days Adventure), (d. 2012).
- June 20: Gillian Hanna, Irish actress (voice of Betty McArthur in The Amazing World of Gumball, Midwife and Aunty Flo in Ethel & Ernest), (d. 2019).
- June 24: Julian Holloway, British actor (voice of Odlaw in Where's Wally?, Bradford Milbanks in James Bond Jr., Captain Zed in Captain Zed and the Zee Zone, Digby in Dan Dare: Pilot of the Future, Siegfried Fischbacher in Father of the Pride, Prime Minister Almec and Admiral Kilian in Star Wars: The Clone Wars, Death in Regular Show), (d. 2025).
- June 27: Will Jennings, American lyricist (Pinocchio and the Emperor of the Night, The Land Before Time, An American Tail: Fievel Goes West), (d. 2024).
- June 29: Gary Busey, American actor (voice of Mad Dog in the King of the Hill episode "Soldier of Misfortune", Coach Red Harris in the Tom Goes to the Mayor episode "Wrestling", Alternate Universe Peabody in The Mr. Peabody & Sherman Show episode "The Wrath of Hughes", himself in The Simpsons episode "On a Clear Day I Can't See My Sister" and the American Dad! episode "She Swill Survive").

=== July ===
- July 4: Susan Kellermann, American actress (additional voices in Courage the Cowardly Dog).
- July 8: Jeffrey Tambor, American actor (voice of Big Nose in the Tangled franchise, King Neptune in The SpongeBob SquarePants Movie, Santa Claus in Super Sleuth Christmas Movie, Carl Murphy in Monsters vs. Aliens, Glossaryck in Star vs. the Forces of Evil, Mr. Calvin Curdles in Scooby-Doo! Abracadabra-Doo, King Peppy in Trolls, Captain Flarty in the Bob's Burgers episode "Mutiny on the Windbreaker").
- July 22: Peter Jason, American actor (voice of Manny in The New Batman Adventures, Coach Creager in Batman Beyond, Coach in Hair High, Exterminator in The Secret World of Arrietty, Nix in Mixels, Mason in the Batman: The Animated Series episode "It's Never Too Late", Royal Treasurer in the Happily Ever After: Fairy Tales for Every Child episode "The Emperor's New Clothes", Bobby Nacht in the Pinky and the Brain episode "Hoop Schemes", Farmer MacDonald in the Jackie Chan Adventures episode "The Amazing T-Troop"), (d. 2025).
- July 23: Pepe Serna, American actor (voice of Mr. Sanchez in The PJs, Shifflet in the Justice League episode "Hearts and Minds", Stevedore in The Zeta Project episode "The Next Gen").
- July 30: Jimmy Cliff, Jamaican composer (Squidbillies) and actor (himself in the Space Ghost Coast to Coast episode "Speck"), (d. 2025).

=== August ===
- August 4: Richard Belzer, American actor (voice of Loogie in the South Park episode "The Tooth Fairy's Tats 2000"), (d. 2023).
- August 7: John Glover, American actor (voice of Riddler in the DC Animated Universe, Dyson in Tron: Uprising, King Edward in The Legend of Prince Valiant episode "The Blackest Poison", Rasputin in the Animaniacs episode "Nothing but the Tooth").
- August 9: Sam Elliott, American actor (voice of Ben in Barnyard, Butch in The Good Dinosaur, Fleetwood Yak in Rock Dog, Trusty in Lady and the Tramp, White Wine Narrator, Skito and Reporter in Robot Chicken, Wild West in Family Guy, Axe Cop's Dad in the Axe Cop episode "Axe Cop Saves God", Big John Tanner in the American Dad! episode "Kiss Kiss Cam Cam", himself in the Robot Chicken episode "Endgame" and the Family Guy episode "Girl, Internetted").
- August 11: Ian McDiarmid, Scottish actor (voice of Palpatine in the Star Wars franchise).
- August 18: Bodo Wolf, German actor (German dub voice of Reggie Bellafonte in Surf's Up, Professor Von Schlemmer in Adventures of Sonic the Hedgehog), (d. 2023).
- August 27: G.W. Bailey, American actor (voice of Rusty in Home on the Range).

=== September ===
- September 3: David Landsberg, American actor (voice of Woody in The Buford Files, Mr. Griff in Stanley), (d. 2018).
- September 6:
  - Frank Mouris, American animator (Frank Film).
  - Swoosie Kurtz, American actress (voice of Minka Kropotkin in Rugrats, Martha Kent in Superman: Doomsday, Michelle Naidell in The Wild Thornberrys episode "The Wild Snob-berry").
- September 12:
  - B. J. Ward, American actress (voice of Scarlett in G.I. Joe: A Real American Hero, the title character in Jana of the Jungle, Princess Allura in Voltron, Betty Ross in The Incredible Hulk, continued voice of Betty Rubble and Velma Dinkley).
  - Barry White, American singer and songwriter (voice of Samson and Brother Bear in Coonskin, himself in The Simpsons episodes "Whacking Day" and "Krusty Gets Kancelled"), (d. 2003).
- September 19: Bob Hathcock, American animator (Hanna-Barbera), storyboard artist (The Smurfs, Garbage Pail Kids, Sonic the Hedgehog, Duckman), sheet timer (Sonic the Hedgehog, Mighty Max, Beethoven, Exosquad, Freakazoid!, Duckman, Jumanji, The Mask), producer and director (Hanna-Barbera, Garbage Pail Kids, Disney Television Animation, Klasky Csupo, Adelaide Productions, Strawberry Shortcake's Berry Bitty Adventures, Maryoku Yummy).
- September 25: Michael Douglas, American actor and producer (voice of Guy-Am-I in Green Eggs and Ham, Patrick Henry in Liberty's Kids, Waylon in the Phineas and Ferb episode "That's the Spirit", Hank Pym / Yellowjacket in the What If...? episode "What If... the World Lost Its Mightiest Heroes?").

=== October ===
- October 3: Roy Horn, German-American magician, entertainer and producer (Father of the Pride), (d. 2020).
- October 7: Jill Frappier, English-Canadian actress (voice of Luna in the original English dub of Sailor Moon).
- October 8: Thom Huge, American voice actor and producer (voice of Jon Arbuckle, Roy Rooster, Binky the Clown, and other various characters in the Garfield franchise).
- October 9: John Entwistle, English musician and member of The Who (voiced himself in The Simpsons episode "A Tale of Two Springfields"), (d. 2002).
- October 14: Udo Kier, German actor (voice of Professor Pericles in Scooby-Doo! Mystery Incorporated, Mister Toad in Beware the Batman, Music Master in the Justice League episode "Legends", Bert in The Batman episode "Q&A"), (d. 2025).
- October 15: Haim Saban, Israeli-American media proprietor, investor, and producer of records, film, and television (co-founder of Saban Entertainment).
- October 17: Steve Maslow, American sound mixer (Thumbelina, A Troll in Central Park, The Pagemaster, The Pebble and the Penguin, Balto, Cats Don't Dance, Antz), (d. 2026).
- October 22: David W. Allen, American stop-motion animator (When Dinosaurs Ruled the Earth, Laserblast, The Howling, Twilight Zone: The Movie, Honey, I Shrunk the Kids, Puppet Master), (d. 1999).
- October 23: Mike Harding, English musician, comedian, author, and poet (Cosgrove Hall Films).
- October 28: Dennis Franz, American retired actor (voice of Captain Klegghorn in Mighty Ducks: The Animated Series, himself as Homer Simpson in The Simpsons episode "Homer Badman").
- October 29: Nicola Cuti, American comic book artist, animator (Defenders of the Earth, Barbie and the Rockers: Out of This World, BraveStarr, Disney Television Animation, The Brothers Flub), art director (Exosquad) and background artist (Double Dragon, Problem Child, The Critic, Street Fighter, Biker Mice from Mars, RoboCop: Alpha Commando, Dilbert, The Cramp Twins), (d. 2020).

=== November ===
- November 2: Michael Buffer, American ring announcer (voice of Ring Announcer in the South Park episode "Damien" and the Phineas and Ferb episode "Raging Bully", Stoker Announcer in Rumble, himself in The Simpsons episode "The Homer They Fall", Celebrity Deathmatch, and the Clerks: The Animated Series episode "A Dissertation On The American Justice System By People Who Have Never Been Inside A Courtroom, Let Alone Anything About Law, But Have Seen Way Too Many Legal Thrillers").
- November 4: Linda Gary, American actress (voice of Queen Salena in Nausicaä of the Valley of the Wind, Teela, the Sorceress of Castle Grayskull, Evil-Lyn, and Queen Marlena in He-Man and the Masters of the Universe, Grandma Longneck in The Land Before Time franchise, Entrapta, Madame Razz, Scorpia, Shadow Weaver, and Glimmer in She-Ra: Princess of Power, Chromia in The Transformers, Aunt May in seasons 1-3 of Spider-Man, Nora Crest in Batman: The Animated Series, Dr. Abby Sinian in Swat Kats: The Radical Squadron), (d. 1995).
- November 10: Tim Rice, English lyricist (Aladdin, The Lion King, The Road to El Dorado).
- November 17:
  - Gary Goldman, American film producer, director, animator, writer and actor (Walt Disney Company, Don Bluth).
  - Danny DeVito, American actor (voice of Philoctetes in Hercules, the title character in The Lorax, Swackhammer in Space Jam, Grundle King in My Little Pony: The Movie, Herb Powell in The Simpsons, Satan in Little Demon, Merv Stampington in the Big City Greens episode "Long Goodbye").
  - Lorne Michaels, Canadian-American television writer and film producer (The Coneheads, Frosty Returns, The Awesomes, The David S. Pumpkins Halloween Special, Saturday Morning All Star Hits!).
- November 18: Susan Sullivan, American actress (voice of Hippolyta in the DC Animated Universe, Mrs. Frederickson in Big Hero 6: The Series).
- November 21: Harold Ramis, American actor, (voice of Zeke in Heavy Metal), comedian, director and writer (Rover Dangerfield), (d. 2014).
- November 25: Ben Stein, American actor, comedian, and political commentator (voice of Head Pixie in The Fairly OddParents, Trivia in Hercules, Dr. Arthur Neuman in The Mask: Animated Series, Pip Pumphandle in Animaniacs and Pinky and the Brain, H.A. Futterman in the Freakazoid! episode "Relax-O-Vision", Rosebud in the Earthworm Jim episode "The Great Secret of the Universe").
- November 27: Bruce Adler, American actor and singer (singing voice of the Peddler in Aladdin and Aladdin and the King of Thieves), (d. 2008).

=== December ===
- December 9: Clive Endersby, Canadian actor and television writer (Nelvana, Anne of Green Gables: The Animated Series, Toad Patrol, The Eggs, Faireez, Horrid Henry, Mr Moon, The Cat in the Hat Knows a Lot About That!, My Big Big Friend).
- December 11: Teri Garr, American actress (voice of Mary McGinnis in Batman Beyond, Molly Quinn in Aloha, Scooby-Doo!, Selena in The Legend of Prince Valiant, Vanessa Le Pert in the Duckman episode "It's the Thing of the Principal", Laney in the King of the Hill episode "Bill of Sales", Sandy Gordon in the What's New, Scooby-Doo? episode "Toy Story Boo"), (d. 2024).
- December 12: Sandy Benenati, American ink and paint artist (Wizards), production assistant and animation checker (Ruby-Spears Enterprises, Hanna-Barbera, Cartoon Network Studios).
- December 17: Bernard Hill, English actor (voice of The Judge in ParaNorman, Bottom in the Shakespeare: The Animated Tales episode "A Midsummer Night's Dream", Theseus in Midsummer Dream), (d. 2024).
- December 21: Michael Tilson Thomas, American composer (Bugs and Daffy's Carnival of the Animals), (d. 2026).
- December 26: Jane Lapotaire, English actress (voice of Sarah in the Testament: The Bible in Animation episode "Abraham"), (d. 2026).
- December 31: Neil Ross, English-American actor (voice of Lieutenant Kellaway in The Mask: Animated Series, Keith and Pidge in Voltron, Green Goblin in Spider-Man, Spider-Man and His Amazing Friends, and Spider-Man: The Animated Series, Doctor Doom in Fantastic Four, Fin Fang Foom and Howard Stark in Iron Man, Cyclops in The SpongeBob SquarePants Movie, Clyde in Pac-Man, Benton Quest in Harvey Birdman, Attorney at Law, various characters in The Transformers and G.I. Joe: A Real American Hero).

=== Specific date unknown ===
- Robert Taylor, American animator, producer, writer and film director (The Nine Lives of Fritz the Cat), (d. 2014).
- Clive A. Smith, English animator (co-founder of Nelvana).
- Francoise Brun-Cottan, French-American actress (original voice of Nibbles in the Tom and Jerry franchise).
- Beau Billingslea, American actor (voice of Homura in Naruto, Jet Black in Cowboy Bebop).

== Deaths ==
=== July ===
- July 9: Kent Rogers, American actor (voice of Beaky Buzzard and Junior Bear in Looney Tunes, continued voice of Woody Woodpecker in Walter Lantz's cartoons), dies at age 20.
- July 16: Count Cutelli, Italian-American actor (provided sound effects for various 1930s Hollywood cartoons), dies at age 55.

=== November ===
- November 27: Willard Bowsky, American animator (Fleischer Studios), dies at age 37.

== See also ==
- List of anime by release date (1939–1945)
