= Dame Care =

1928 film

- Directed by: Robert Land
- Written by: Hermann Sudermann (novel); Curt J. Braun
- Starring: Fritz Kortner; Mary Carr; William Dieterle
- Cinematography: Sepp Allgeier; Arthur Martinelli
- Music by: Walter Ulfig
- Production company: Deutsche Film Union
- Distributed by: Deutsche First National Pictures
- Release date: 7 February 1928
- Running time: 125 minutes
- Country: Germany
- Languages: Silent; German intertitles

Dame Care (German: Frau Sorge) is a 1928 German silent drama film directed by Robert Land and starring Fritz Kortner, Mary Carr and William Dieterle. It is based on the 1887 novel Frau Sorge by Hermann Sudermann. It was shot at the Staaken Studios in Berlin. The film's sets were designed by the art director Robert Neppach. It was distributed by the German branch of First National Pictures.

== Cast ==
- Fritz Kortner as Der alte Meyhöfer
- Mary Carr as Seine Frau
- William Dieterle as Paul, der Sohn
- Grete Mosheim as Käthe, die Tochter
- Carl de Vogt as Baron Douglas
- Hermine Sterler as Seine Frau
- Vera Schmiterlöw as Elsbeth, die Tochter
- Louis Ralph as Michael Raudszus, der Knecht
- Anton Pointner as Fritz Erdmann
- Max Hansen as Ulrich Erdmann

== Bibliography ==
- Bock, Hans-Michael & Bergfelder, Tim. The Concise CineGraph. Encyclopedia of German Cinema. Berghahn Books, 2009.
