= Midsummer Night's Fire =

1939 film directed by Arthur Maria Rabenalt

- German film poster
- German: Johannisfeuer
- Directed by: Arthur Maria Rabenalt
- Screenplay by: Alf Teichs; Kurt Heuser
- Based on: Fires of St. John by Hermann Sudermann
- Produced by: Ernst Günter Techow
- Starring: Anna Dammann; Ernst von Klipstein; Gertrud Meyen
- Cinematography: Willy Winterstein
- Edited by: Alice Ludwig
- Music by: Herbert Windt
- Production company: Terra Film
- Distributed by: Terra Film
- Release date: 3 November 1939
- Running time: 83 minutes
- Country: Germany
- Language: German

Midsummer Night's Fire or St. John's Fire (German: Johannisfeuer) is a 1939 German drama film directed by Arthur Maria Rabenalt and starring Anna Dammann, Ernst von Klipstein, and Gertrud Meyen. The film is based on the play Fires of St. John by Hermann Sudermann. The title refers to Saint John's Eve.

The film's art direction was by Carl Böhm and Erich Czerwonski. Location shooting took place in Prenzlau and around Masuria in East Prussia. It was remade in 1954 as Love is Forever.

== Plot ==
After many years in Africa, a man returns to his village in East Prussia to marry his intended bride. However, he finds himself drawn to another girl and contemplates running away with her.

== Cast ==
- Anna Dammann as Marikke
- Ernst von Klipstein as Georg
- Gertrud Meyen as Trude Vogelreuter
- Hans Brausewetter as Haffke
- Otto Wernicke as Vogelreuter
- Maria Koppenhöfer as Weszkalnene
- Erich Dunskus as Plötz
- Charlott Daudert as Elise
- Jeanette Bethge as Mamsell
- Lilo Bergen
- Erich Ziegel as Magerdick
- Änne Bruck
- Kurt Dreml
- Christine Grossmann
- Herbert Klatt
- Armin Münch
- Hellmuth Passarge
- Heinz Rippert
- Annemarie Schäfer
- Willi Schwarz
- Theodor Vogeler
- Constanze von Eyck
- Karin Mairlechner
- Ruth von Enckevort

== Production ==
Certain scenes judged too "paganistic" by censors of the time in Nazi Germany were cut from the film.
