= Jons und Erdme =

1959 film directed by Victor Vicas

- Directed by: Victor Vicas
- Screenplay by: Robert A. Stemmle; Victor Vicas
- Based on: "Jons and Erdma" (short story) by Hermann Sudermann
- Produced by: Alf Teichs; Herbert Uhlich
- Cinematography: Göran Strindberg
- Music by: Bernhard Eichhorn
- Release date: 4 September 1959
- Running time: 101 minutes
- Country: West Germany
- Language: German

Jons und Erdme is a 1959 West German drama film directed by Victor Vicas, starring Giulietta Masina and Carl Raddatz. It is based on the story "Jons and Erdma" from Hermann Sudermann's 1917 short story collection The Excursion to Tilsit.

== Cast ==
- Giulietta Masina as Erdme
- Carl Raddatz as Jons Baltruschowsky
- Karin Baal as Katrike, beider Tochter
- Richard Basehart as Wittkuhn, der Schmied
- Gert Fröbe as Smailus, ehem. russischer Matrose
- Werner Peters as Paul Schmidt, Friseur
- Dietmar Schönherr as Direktor der Seifenfabrik
- Agnes Fink as Anna, seine Frau
- Berta Drews as Jasgulka, seine dritte Frau
- Siegfried Wischnewski as Kippsass, the quack
- Elke Aberle as Mädchen
- Helga Münster as Ulele, seine Tochter aus erster Ehe
- Willy Rösner as Der Moorvogt
- Dorothea Sudermann as Mädchen in der Seifenfabrik
- Lila Kedrova
