= Das dumme Gänslein =

1944 film

- Directed by: Hans Fischerkoesen
- Distributed by: Verwitterte Melodie
- Release date: 8 November 1944
- Running time: 13 min.
- Country: Nazi Germany
- Language: German

Das dumme Gänslein (The Silly Goose) is one in a trio of German animated short films produced in 1944 by Hans Fischerkoesen, who was the chief animator and author. It is a tale of a female goose consumed by adventure and urban glamour in her countryside life, who has to be saved from a cunning fox by her friends and family. The overt moral of the cartoon is to avoid an extravagant and adventurous life due to its possible unexpected consequences, but rather to lead a 'normal' (German) family life. Though this "There's no place like home" theme was a commonplace of 1930s and '40s animation, in this cartoon there is special emphasis, typical of Nazi propaganda, on the Völkisch ideology of conformity and conventionality, portraying individualism and sexual freedom (seeking pleasure rather than to be the mother of 'true' German children) as inherently both alien and dangerous. The cartoon suggests that divergence from traditional German life could be dire, even possibly lethal, in line with National Socialist characterizations of opponents of the regime as asocial, disloyal, and self-destructive. The film also hints at antisemitism through the character of the cunning fox.

== Plot ==
The scene begins with the mother goose and her four children imprisoned in a wooden cart traveling to the countryside. While on their journey they pass a vibrant city which includes urban glamour shops influenced by international fashion, an exotic parrot and lively music. The mother goose and the other three siblings are frightened, but the silly goose is mesmerised by the bright lights and people dancing. The mother drags the goose back away from the urban city surroundings and drops her. Meanwhile, a passing cart is carrying a fox stole. The silly goose touches it when again the mother drags her back. When approaching the countryside the other geese are happy, while the silly goose seems bored with her rural surroundings, at which the mother looks perplexed as to why. A train passes by which quickly shifts this arrangement as the silly goose is excited to see something unnatural, whereas the mother pulls the other siblings back in fear. When they arrive at the farm they are released from the wooden box and allowed to be free in their rural environment.

The silly goose then begins to admire herself in the reflection of the water, while the mother teaches the other geese how to drink. It is repeatedly shown in different scenes how the three geese march after their mother and learn from her, whereas the silly goose mocks them. The silly goose then tries to make luxury items out of ordinary things. For example, she uses a caterpillar as a scarf, corks as heels, straw hats and makes eyelashes from pig hairs. The other animals on the farm shake their heads in disapproval. The goose admires herself in a mirror, then her mother smashes the glass and tries to teach her how to lay an egg. After this, a traditional German gander approaches the silly goose with the intention to court her, however she turns him away.

Following this, the goose is approached by a sly fox, shown as peering through the fence and creeping up on her. After stealing a scarecrows clothes, the fox then charms her back to his lair. When entering the lair the fox lets out a sinister laugh. Inside the lair there are geese locked up, a slave cat making music on a xylophone of bones and ants turning a spit roast. The goose then tries to escape and is trapped in the mouth of the fox running through the forest. Eventually she is rescued by all the animals on the farm. After this, the silly goose is with the gander and their four children, which she keeps in line and doesn't allow them to behave in her previous ‘silly’ ways.

== Historical context ==
The animation's main purpose was to instill Nazi ideology onto the public, specifically German youth. The underlining theme is to live the ‘traditional German life’ and not deviate towards adventure or luxury, with the animation grounded in nature. It was produced in 1944 when censorship of all media, including child short films, had to go through Joseph Goebbels who was the leader of the Ministry of Public Enlightenment and Propaganda from 13 March 1933. The totalitarian state wanted to have absolute control of media in an attempt to control the masses, and Goebbels himself claimed: "German cinema had the mission of conquering the world as the vanguard of the Nazi troops". The principle of the cartoon was to keep the German population in line and implant the idea that if someone was to variate from what they were told, the consequences could be fatal. Between 1939 and 1941, film propaganda would have been less effective because public opinion regarding the war did not need influencing as much. However, from 1941 onwards when German defeats began, tales such as these became valuable to keep the public in order and keep support for the government strong. Lord Northcliffe claimed that "The bombardment of the German mind was almost as important as the bombardment by cannon". The ministry recognised that to reach the maximum target audience, their propaganda must be intellectually slower so more people could understand the basic concepts, and to offer escapism from the serious social and political problems without the audience being aware it was propaganda. In Mein Kampf it recognised that ‘propaganda must be addressed to the emotions and not to intelligence’. This led to many children's animations being produced, leading to film being one type of media which helped to crush Hitler's opposition in Germany. This animation includes four main aspects: the role of the mother, being asocial, antisemitism and showing Fischerkoesen subtle resistance to some of the Nazi policies.

== Themes and interpretation ==
=== Role of the mother ===
One of the main Völkisch ideologies was the role of the traditional German mother that would produce many children to fulfil their biological obligation. This is represented in the Kinderreich (with many children) policy, which rewarded women who had four or more children. The animation demonstrates this ideology by showing the mother and the silly goose eventually having four children each, despite previously not learning how to lay an egg. In addition, with the silly goose turning away the normal German goose and being charmed by the fox, can relate to the other tropes in Nazi ideology, such as inter-racial marriages being prohibited between people of ‘true’ German blood and Jews, with the Nuremberg Law for the Protection of German Blood and German Honour in September 1935 enforcing this.

=== Being asocial ===
The animation shows the silly goose in some aspects to be what Nazis would define as ‘asocial’. The definition of asocial is very elastic and could range from being a thief, alcoholic, prostitute or anyone that resisted the Nazi authority and ideals. With the silly goose consumed by luxury and embracing the facets of Parisian fashion is criticised in many areas in the animation. The most obvious example being when she uses natural aspects to dress and look differently, such as using pig hairs as eyelashes. This was condemned by the Nazi party for two reasons. Firstly, it went against their ideal for a traditional Aryan German race, with women wearing no makeup, being natural and physically healthy. Secondly, with the war affecting the German economy, propaganda was aimed at preventing people buying international goods in order to keep money in the country. Goebbels announced that propaganda for merchandise such as clothes had to be discontinued in 1941, because no one could afford them and it would ‘draw blood’. Therefore, the ideal to create a united German nation was achievable by no individuals varying from the country look. This concept is displayed in the animation towards the beginning, where the cart drives past the glamorous urban city and the silly goose is pulled away by her mother and dropped. This represents the first symbol of hurt from embracing the urban city life, reflecting it back to if someone went against Völkisch ideology there could be fatal circumstances, with two thirds of non-Jews in concentration camps, during 1933 to 1943, being defined as asocials. Therefore, the motive to influence the audience to be natural and not be taken to urbanite glamour underlines the animation and can reinforce the idea that the animation was in fact propaganda to indoctrinate the youth.

=== Antisemitic references ===
The character of the fox represented in the cartoon can be symbolic of antisemitism during Hitler's dictatorship. Stereotypes of the Jewish population were at their height in 1944, for example being cunning and having large noses, and of course, many factors played into part to alienate and exterminate them from society. Therefore, with the master Aryan race being part of Nazi ideology they used propaganda as a tool for exclusion, with Jews becoming the central characters of many films from 1939 onwards. Although the animation does not directly link the character of the fox to Jews, background of other instances doing this using foxes, rats and pests, can suggest its message was to exterminate them as a necessity and not a crime. An example of this can be Der Störenfried, which was a German animation produced in 1940. Its content includes Nazi forces fighting against and eventually beating the fox, with the German people rejoicing at the end. The animation indirectly instils the concept of the corrupt "Jew in disguise", with an international conspiracy to take over the world, such as in Jud Süss. Another example of this can be from a booklet for the German youth called "The German National Catechism", which states, "the goal of the Jew is to make himself the ruler of humanity". The first representation of the fox in the animation is at the beginning with the fox stole on a passing cart. By the silly goose being drawn to it, and the mother goose pulling her away can show the idea that Germans should stay away from Jews. Furthermore, the most prominent representation of the Jew in the animation is the character of the fox that charms the silly goose back to his lair. The method the fox follows to bring her back can be seen as ritualistic and reiterates the theme of a Jewish conspiracy to conquer the world. Therefore, it can be said that the animation was subtly alienating the Jewish population and to some extent trying to justify the exclusion of Jews through the mass killings which began from March 1942. In addition, the way in which the fox is defeated can tell a lot about attitudes towards Jews. With all the farm coming together to chase him away could signify that the Germans needed to be united in their "fight" against the Jewish population.

William Moritz argues that Hans Fischerkoesen is in fact subverting the ideology of Nazism through the silly goose, pointing that the symbolism being used within the film pushes more against the ideology of fascism and Nazi propaganda.

=== Hans Fischerkoesen’s personal beliefs ===
With the animation being in close contact with Goebbels it clearly had hints of typical Nazi propaganda aspects as stated above. However Fischerkoesen's own personal beliefs on Nazi policies could have been quite different. There are a few aspects within the animation which suggest Fischerkoesen himself did not agree with Nazi policies, such as the concentration camps. For example, the animation shows animal entrapment, brutality and exploitation which could reflect how people were treated in the camps. These could show Fischerkoesen had a humanitarian perspective and did not agree with some of the Nazi's actions, with him working front line in World War One. However, he made the animation to fit into the circumstance as he didn't want to oppose the regime.

== Links to other animations ==
When Hans Fischerkoesen produced this short animation he also produced two others (as a trio) with the same underlining concept: adventure and luxury would eventually lead to personal downfall. These shorts are: Der Schneemann (The Snowman, 1944) and Verwitterte Melodie (Weathered Melody, 1942), which were both ideas from Horst von Möllendorff. Der Schneemann is particularly interesting because it represents the idea that if one were trapped in a given environment, they must be functional to survive, presented in the snowman leaving his environment and having a fatal end. This links to German society, where people would have been expected to stay in their environment and not be adventurous, emphasising the fear policy the Nazis held. Also, there is another animation called Armer Hansi produced in 1943 with a similar concept.

Quality of animation to the Ministry of Popular Enlightenment and Propaganda became very important, which is demonstrated in these shorts. As stated by Hans Steinback in 1937, they used film as a messenger of Völkisch ideology, and with the war ongoing Goebbels wanted to represent Germany as growing industrially just as in peacetime, and to be able to compete with the rival; America. To improve the quality for this trio of shorts Fischerkoesen used a combination of 2D and 3D, using the stereo animation stand. When released, the animation became well known for its quality. Emil Reinegger, head of Paris Film Distributors, claimed that it was surprisingly favourable and better than the bulk of American trick films.
