= The Journey to Tilsit =

1939 film by Veit Harlan

- Directed by: Veit Harlan
- Written by: Hermann Sudermann (novella); Wolfgang Schleif; Veit Harlan
- Produced by: Helmut Eweler; Franz Tappers
- Starring: Kristina Söderbaum; Philip Dorn; Anna Dammann; Albert Florath
- Cinematography: Bruno Mondi
- Edited by: Marianne Behr
- Music by: Hans-Otto Borgmann
- Production company: Majestic-Film
- Distributed by: Tobis Film
- Release date: 2 November 1939
- Running time: 90 minutes
- Country: Nazi Germany
- Language: German
- Budget: 1.012 million ℛℳ
- Box office: 2.537 million ℛℳ

The Journey to Tilsit (German: Die Reise nach Tilsit) is a 1939 German drama film directed by Veit Harlan and starring Kristina Söderbaum, Philip Dorn and Anna Dammann.

== Synopsis ==
Elske faithfully loves her fisherman husband Endrik as he is seduced by a foreign schemer, Madlyn. Madlyn persuades him to murder Elske and run off with her. He lures Elske into the boat as a prelude to drowning her. Though he is unable to carry it out, she realizes his intent. When they reach the shore, she flees to the city of Tilsit, and he follows to plead for forgiveness. They return, and a storm blows up while they are in the boat. Endrik gets ashore, believing Elske to have drowned. He reacts with anger to Madlyn, but learns that Elske did survive.

== Cast ==
- Kristina Söderbaum as Elske Settegast
- Philip Dorn as Endrik Settegast
- Anna Dammann as Madlyn Sapierska
- Albert Florath as Lehrer
- Ernst Legal as Herr Wittkuhn
- Manny Ziener as Frau Papendieck
- Charlotte Schultz as Frau Wittkuhn
- Eduard von Winterstein as Erwin Bohrmann
- Clemens Hasse as Junger Mann aus der Straßenbahn
- Jakob Tiedtke as Gastwirt
- Paul Westermeier as Ausrufer
- Wolfgang Kieling as Klein Franz
- Joachim Pfaff as Klein Jons
- Heinz Dugall as Klein Wittkuhn
- Babsi Schultz-Reckewell as Mariechen
- Lotte Spira as Frau im Café
- Eduard Wenck as Dorfbewohner
- Alfred Karen as Besitzer des Pelzgeschäfts
- Heinz Müller as Dicker Mann auf dem Jahrmarkt
- Ferdinand Robert as Gast im Cafe in Tilsit
- Betty Waid as Alte Frau aus dem Dorf
- Max Wilmsen as Begleiter, der Frau im Cafe
- Bruno Ziener as Ober im Cafe

== Motifs ==
Elske, as is typical for Kristina Söderbaum's roles, is a model of patient, virtuous and old-fashioned wifehood and of pure and healthy Aryan stock, stemming from her country living, whereas her rival is Polish, promiscuous, and city-dwelling, an obvious product of "asphalt culture". Her victory reflected a need to avoid temptation to adultery, when many families were separated.

== Production ==
The film is a sound remake of the 1927 silent film Sunrise: A Song of Two Humans, which was based on Hermann Sudermann's 1917 short story "The Excursion to Tilsit", from the collection with the same title. Harlan maintained it was a true film, whereas Sunrise was only a poem, and it did avoid the symbols and soft focus of that film for more realism. It was shot at the Johannisthal Studios in Berlin and on location in Tilsit, where the action takes place.

== Premiere ==
Magda Goebbels ostentatiously left the premiere, owing to the accidental resemblance between it and her own situation, where Joseph Goebbels carried on with the Czech actress Lída Baarová. (It was similarly resolved, with the actress being sent back to Czechoslovakia, and Hitler himself informing Goebbels that there would be no divorce.)
