= DZF =

DZF can refer to:

- Deutsche Zeichentrickfilme GmbH, a Nazi German animated propaganda film company
- DZF, an agriculture company listed on the Shenzhen Stock Exchange; see List of companies listed on the Shenzhen Stock Exchange#2001–2100
- Paranonychidae, a family of daddy longlegs, by Catalogue of Life identifier
- DZF, an opera performed by Guy Barker in the Guy Barker Jazz Orchestra
