= Love Is Forever (1954 film) =

1954 film

Love is Forever
- Directed by: Wolfgang Liebeneiner
- Screenplay by: Eberhard Keindorff; Johanna Sibelius
- Based on: Fires of St. John by Hermann Sudermann
- Produced by: Karl Mitschke; Kurt Ulrich; Heinz Willeg
- Starring: Karlheinz Böhm; Ulla Jacobsson; Ingrid Andree
- Cinematography: Willy Winterstein
- Edited by: Hermann Leitner
- Music by: Alois Melichar
- Production company: Berolina Film
- Distributed by: Constantin Film
- Release date: 13 August 1954
- Running time: 96 minutes
- Country: West Germany
- Language: German

Love is Forever (German: ...und ewig bleibt die Liebe) is a 1954 West German drama film directed by Wolfgang Liebeneiner and starring Karlheinz Böhm, Ulla Jacobsson and Ingrid Andree. The film is based on the play Fires of St. John by Hermann Sudermann.

It was shot at the Tempelhof Studios in Berlin. The film's art direction was by Willi Herrmann and Heinrich Weidemann. It was shot using Agfacolor.

== Cast ==
- Karlheinz Böhm as Georg
- Ulla Jacobsson as Marieke
- Ingrid Andree as Trude Vogelreuther
- Magda Schneider as Mrs. Vogelreuther
- Paul Dahlke as Mr. Vogelreuther
- Günther Lüders as Ploetz
- Lucie Englisch
- Karola Ebeling as Erna
- Erich Ponto
- Hans Quest as Hasske
- Jakob Tiedtke as The Priest
- Nina von Porembsky as Lina
- Hilde von Stolz
- Horst Winter

== Bibliography ==
- Williams, Alan. Film and Nationalism. Rutgers University Press, 2002.
