= The Undying Past =

1894 German novel

The Undying Past is an 1894 novel by the German writer Hermann Sudermann. Its German title is Es war which means "it was". The novel tells the story of how a German man, Leo, returns to his homeland after several years in South America, only to find that Ulrich, his beloved childhood friend, has married a woman with whom Leo has a dark past. The book was published in English in 1906, translated by Beatrice Marshall. It was adapted as a silent film as Flesh and the Devil (1926).

== Reception ==
The 19th-century English novelist George Gissing read the novel in the original German edition in 1895, writing in his diary "it is the work of a playwright, and, as such, strong. But the character-drawing seems to me superficial".

William Lyon Phelps wrote about The Undying Past in his 1918 book Essays on Modern Novelists:

The most beautiful and impressive thing in Es War is the friendship between the two men—so different in temperament and so passionately devoted to each other. A large group of characters is splendidly kept in hand, and each is individual and clearly drawn. One can never forget the gluttonous, wine-bibbling Parson, who comes eating and drinking, but who is a terror to publicans and sinners.

== Film adaptation ==
Metro-Goldwyn-Mayer adapted the novel into the 1926 film Flesh and the Devil. The film was directed by Clarence Brown and starred Greta Garbo, John Gilbert, Lars Hanson and Barbara Kent.
