= Fires of St. John =

1900 play by Hermann Sudermann

Fires of St. John (German: Johannisfeuer) is a 1900 play by the German writer Hermann Sudermann. It is also known as Saint John's Fire. The narrative follows a triangle drama between the daughter of a landed proprietor, her cousin who she is engaged to, and her Gypsy adoptive sister who also is in love with the cousin. The drama culminates on a Saint John's Eve which is loaded with both Christian and pre-Christian symbols. The theme of the play is gratitude and dependence, and the bonds it can create.

== Adaptations ==
The play was adapted for film in 1916 as The Flames of Johannis, directed by Edgar Lewis, in 1939 as Midsummer Night's Fire, directed by Arthur Maria Rabenalt, and in 1954 as Love is Forever, directed by Wolfgang Liebeneiner.
