= Flesh and the Devil =

1926 film by Clarence Brown

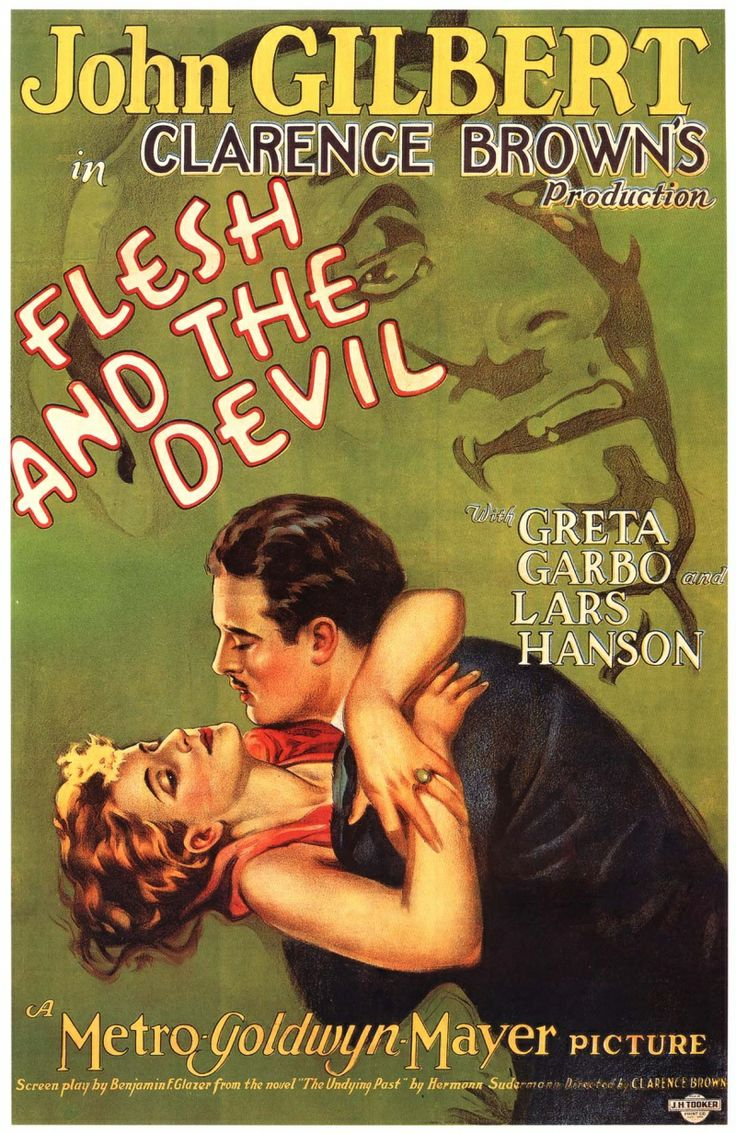
- Theatrical release poster
- Directed by: Clarence Brown
- Written by: Benjamin Glazer; Marian Ainslee (titles)
- Based on: The Undying Past; 1893 novel by Hermann Sudermann
- Produced by: Irving Thalberg
- Starring: Greta Garbo; John Gilbert; Lars Hanson; Barbara Kent
- Cinematography: William H. Daniels
- Edited by: Lloyd Nosler
- Distributed by: Metro-Goldwyn-Mayer
- Release date: December 25, 1926
- Running time: 109 minutes (USA); 113 minutes (UK)
- Country: United States
- Languages: Silent film English intertitles
- Budget: $372,618.21
- Box office: $1,261,000

Flesh and the Devil is a 1926 American silent romantic drama film directed by Clarence Brown and stars Greta Garbo, John Gilbert, Lars Hanson, and Barbara Kent. Based on the 1894 novel The Undying Past by German writer Hermann Sudermann, it was released by Metro-Goldwyn-Mayer on December 25, 1926.

In 2006, Flesh and the Devil was selected for preservation in the United States National Film Registry by the Library of Congress as being "culturally, historically, or aesthetically significant".

== Plot ==
Flesh and the Devil (1926)

Two childhood friends, Leo and Ulrich, grow up to be soldiers in Germany. Leo becomes infatuated with Felicitas, the wife of a powerful count (a marriage about which Felicitas neglects to inform Leo). The count calls for a duel of honor with Leo, but insists that it be done under the false pretense that the quarrel was due to angry words exchanged between the two at a card game to protect the count's reputation. Leo kills the count in the duel, but then is punished by the military by being sent to Africa for five years. Leo asks Ulrich to look after Felicitas, but does not tell him about his feelings for her.

Due to Ulrich's intervention, Leo only serves three years before being recalled home. On his return journey, he focuses on his dream of being reunited with Felicitas, but he is shocked to discover that she and Ulrich have married.

Despite the marriage, Felicitas repeatedly attempts to rekindle the romance with Leo, who finds himself torn between her and Ulrich. Condemned by a local pastor for continuing to associate with Felicitas, Leo eventually loses control of his emotions and tries to choke Felicitas to death; he is stopped by Ulrich, leading to a climactic duel between the two boyhood friends. While racing to stop the duel, Felicitas falls through a layer of thin ice and drowns. Ulrich and Leo realize the importance of their friendship and abort the duel.

== Cast ==
- John Gilbert as Leo von Harden
- Greta Garbo as Felicitas von Rhaden
- Lars Hanson as Ulrich von Eltz
- Barbara Kent as Hertha
- William Orlamond as Uncle Kutowski
- George Fawcett as Pastor Voss
- Eugenie Besserer as Leo's Mother
- Marc McDermott as Count von Rhaden
- Marcelle Corday as Minna

Uncredited

- Max Barwyn as Ball Guest
- Philippe De Lacy as Leo as a Boy
- Polly Moran as Woman with Bouquet
- Cecilia Parker as Twin at Ball and the Church
- Linda Parker as Twin at Ball and the Church
- Russ Powell as Family Retainer w/Flag
- Carl 'Major' Roup as Train Station Vendor
- Rolfe Sedan as Women's Hat Salesman
- Ellinor Vanderveer as Guest at Ball
- Glen Walters as Family Retainer

== Production ==
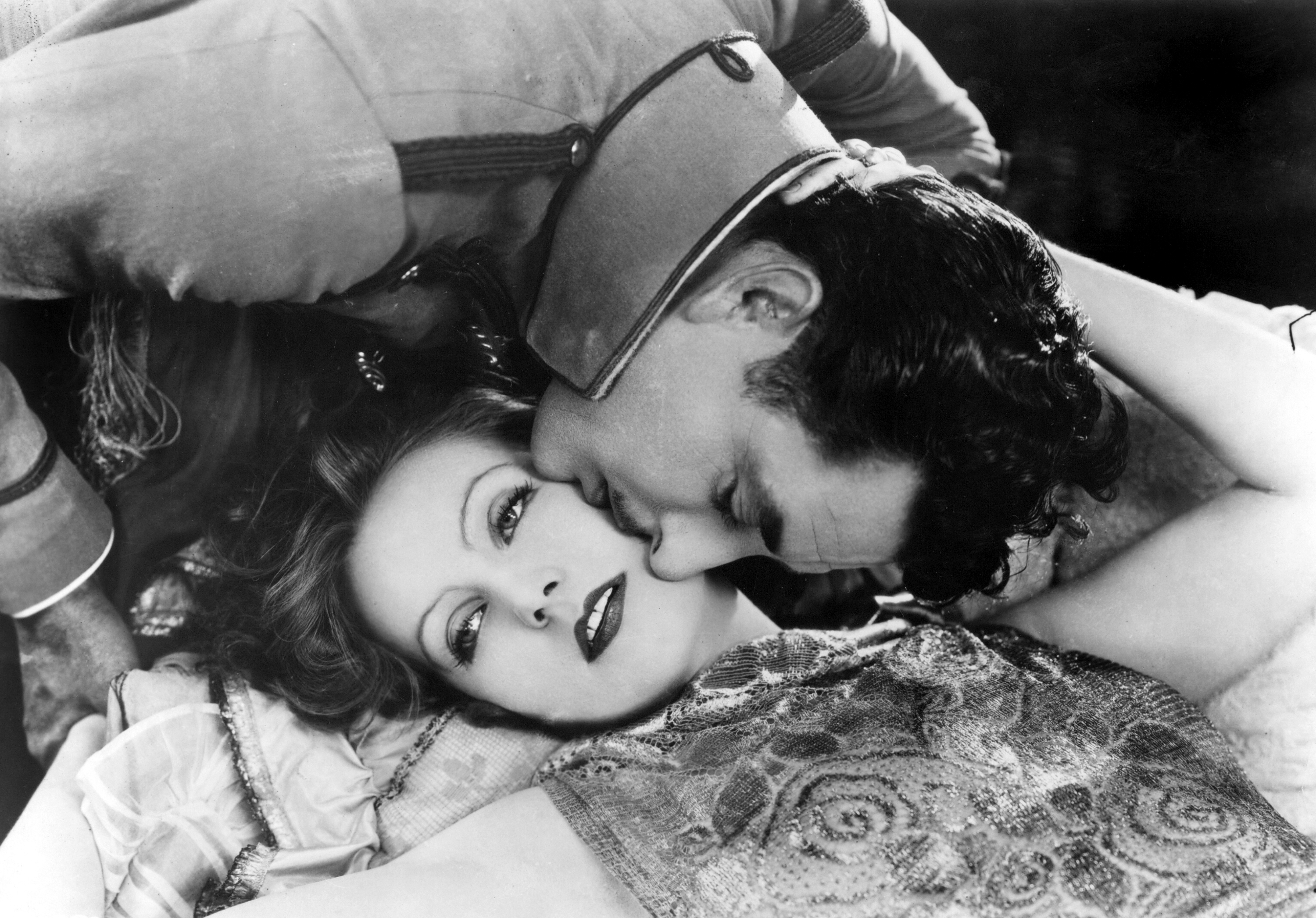
Publicity still with Greta Garbo and John Gilbert for Flesh and the Devil.

Flesh and the Devil, produced in 1926, premiered at New York's Capitol Theatre on January 9, 1927 and marked a turning point for Garbo's personal and professional life. Initially, she refused to participate in the film. She had just finished The Temptress and was tired, plus her sister had recently died of cancer and she was upset that her contract with Metro-Goldwyn-Mayer did not allow her to take the long trip back to Sweden. A sternly worded letter from MGM (read by Garbo biographer Barry Paris on the audio commentary for the 2005 DVD release of the film) warned her of dire consequences if she did not report for work. This was a rehearsal of sorts for a pitched battle Garbo would fight against studio heads after Flesh and the Devil was completed, which ended up with Garbo becoming one of the highest-paid actresses in Hollywood up to that time.

The romantic chemistry between Garbo and Gilbert was a director's dream because it was not faked. The two actors quickly became involved in their own romantic affair and before production of the film was completed had already moved in together (per Paris' commentary). Hollywood legend has it that it was also during production that Gilbert proposed to Garbo; she accepted, a high-profile wedding was arranged, but Garbo backed out. Paris disputes that this could have happened in the midst of production.

Regardless of the chronology, Flesh and the Devil marked the beginning of one of the most famous romances of Hollywood's golden age. They would also continue making movies together into the Sound Era, though Gilbert's career would collapse in the early 1930s while Garbo's soared.

Garbo was so impressed with Clarence Brown's direction and William Daniels's cinematography that she continued to work with both of them in her subsequent films. Brown directed her in a total of seven films, while Daniels served as cinematographer on all but four of her 25 films for MGM.

== Reception ==
In his two reviews for The New York Times, on January 10, 1927, and January 16, 1927, Mordaunt Hall focuses on paying tribute to Clarence Brown's direction and the resulting cinematography. On January 10, he describes the film as “Produced with admirable artistry, both in the unfurling of the chronicle and in the character delineation,… "The Undying Past," is a compelling piece of work in which there are but few conventional movie notes.” He describes Garbo as “undeniably alluring,” but does not examine her “impersonation” further. The longer piece in the Sunday paper is packed with in-depth examination of the film. One gets the impression that just as Hall wishes that the picture could have a longer run on Broadway, he would have liked a longer run in the paper.

On the other hand, Carl Sandburg found a great deal to appreciate in the portrayal of passion in the film. In his February 18, 1927, review for the Chicago Daily News, Sandburg raved: “If there was ever, in screendom, as earnest an exchange of kisses as that between John Gilbert and Greta Garbo in Flesh and the Devil let him who knows of it speak now or forever hold his peace….Miss Garbo is hereafter a star to be reckoned with, so perfectly does she create a character for the heroine, lovely, pitiful, thrilling Felicitas, who drifts downward without ever realizing that the world holds such things as morals.”

On Rotten Tomatoes, the film has a rating of 94% based on 16 contemporary and modern reviews.

== Home media ==
Flesh and the Devil was restored and released to DVD with The Temptress in September 2005 as part of a collection by Turner Classic Movies entitled The Garbo Silents Collection. The DVD includes an alternative, upbeat ending.
