= My Life for Ireland =

Nazi propaganda film set in Ireland

- Directed by: Max W. Kimmich
- Written by: Franz Baumann; Toni Huppertz; Max W. Kimmich
- Starring: Anna Dammann; René Deltgen; Paul Wegener
- Cinematography: Richard Angst
- Edited by: Willy Zeyn
- Music by: Alois Melichar
- Production company: Tobis Film
- Distributed by: Tobis Film
- Release date: 17 February 1941
- Running time: 90 minutes
- Country: Germany
- Language: German

My Life for Ireland (German: Mein Leben für Irland) is a 1941 Nazi German anti-British propaganda drama film produced in World War II. Directed by Max W. Kimmich, it tells a story of an Irish nationalist family and their involvement in the Irish struggle of independence over two generations. The film's sets were designed by the art directors Wilhelm Depenau and Otto Erdmann.

== Plot ==
The film covers the story of two generations of an Irish nationalist family; starting with Michael O'Brien (Werner Hinz) and following with his son, also Michael (Will Quadflieg), eighteen years later in 1921.

The film commences in Dublin in 1903. A squad of police officers break into a thatched hovel and evict the family, throwing a young child to the floor. However they are ambushed by a group of Irish nationalists and a long gun fight ensues. Michael O'Brien is captured and is sentenced to death. While he is in prison, his pregnant fiancée Maeve visits him and they are secretly married. Afterwards, Michael hands his wife a silver cross that will always be worn by the best Irish freedom fighter. On the cross, the words My life for Ireland are engraved.

Eighteen years later, in 1921, his son Michael Jr. is expecting to pass his school leaving exams. As the son of an infamous Irish nationalist, he has been educated at St Edwards College, a school run by British teachers. In this way the British government attempt to re-educate Irish pupils into "worthy" British citizens.

== Cast ==
- Anna Dammann, Maeve Fleming
- René Deltgen, Robert Devoy
- Paul Wegener, Sir George Beverley
- Werner Hinz, Michael O'Brien Senior
- Will Quadflieg, Michael O'Brien Junior
- Heinz Ohlsen, Patrick O'Connor
- Eugen Klöpfer, Duffy
- Hans Bergmann, captain of the 'Black and Tans'
- Claus Clausen, Patrick Pollock
- Will Dohm, Barrington (teacher)
- Karl John, Raymond Davitt
- Hans Quest, Henry Beverley
- Wilhelm Borchert, Thomas O'Neill
- Jack Trevor as the president of the martial court
- Charles John, Raymond Davitt

== Production ==
The film was shot between August and November 1940 in Maulbronn, state of Baden-Württemberg. Actor Will Quadflieg wrote in his 1976 autobiography that the explosives specialist who would plant scheduled land mines during the battle scene between the Irish and English at the end of the film had left the filming team during preparations when he was unexpectedly drafted into the military. As a result, without him, several actors during the filming of that scene were genuinely wounded or had died because of the mine explosions, and these scenes made it into the film. Quadflieg claimed that the incident was pipened down.

== Propaganda ==
This film contributed to the era of anti-British films made by Nazi Germany. In this film, as in Der Fuchs von Glenarvon, the British are depicted as brutal and unscrupulous but no match for the "earthy" Irish race. A British officer, for instance, abandons an Irish sergeant on the battlefield, taking the last water bottle with him, and is later shown winning a VC. It lacks, however, the cruder propaganda of later films, such as Carl Peters and Ohm Krüger, when Hitler had given up hope of making peace with Great Britain. The anti-British atmosphere of Der Fuchs von Glenarvon, for example, can be judged from its opening sequence, which depicts a meeting of Irish revolutionaries:

ASSEMBLY: We must build new roads.
LEADER: With what shall we build new roads?
ASSEMBLY: With the bones of our enemy!
LEADER: And who is our enemy?
ASSEMBLY: England!

Some German viewers in ethnically mixed areas expressed fears that it would stimulate Poles to rebellion. The film, however, enjoyed a positive response from many audiences.
