= The Excursion to Tilsit =

1917 collection of stories by Hermann Sudermann

- Author: Hermann Sudermann
- Original title: Litauische Geschichten
- Translator: Lewis Galantière
- Language: German
- Publisher: J.G. Cotta
- Publication date: 1917
- Publication place: Germany
- English publication date: 1930
- Pages: 488

The Excursion to Tilsit is a 1917 collection of short stories or novellas by the German writer Hermann Sudermann. Its German title is Litauische Geschichten, which means "Lithuanian stories". The book consists of four stories set in rural Lithuania in the mid 19th century. It was published in English in 1930, translated by Lewis Galantière.

Several stories from the book have been adapted for film. Most famously, F. W. Murnau's 1927 film Sunrise: A Song of Two Humans is loosely based on the titular story.

== Stories and plots ==
The Excursion to Tilsit (Die Reise nach Tilsit)
A married man is in love with his mistress and plans to drown his wife on the way back from a trip to Tilsit. During the trip he reconciles with his wife, changes his mind and tells her about his now abandoned plan. In a fatal accident the man drowns and the wife is saved through the means the man had prepared for his own escape.
Miks Bumbullis
A murderer needs to visit the grave of his daughter to please the goddess of death, despite knowing that the police will be there waiting for him.
Jons and Erdma (Jons und Erdme)
A couple become wealthy by the means of tricks and foul play. Eventually they are in turn tricked by their daughters and have to start again from zero.
The Hired Girl (Die Magd)

== Reception ==
Margaret Wallace of The Bookman wrote:

Like Selma Lagerlöf, and many other novelists whose material is national and even provincial, Sudermann by his very unconcern with cosmopolitan values gives a deeper truth and meaning to the lives of his characters. Of these four stories of Lithuanian peasants, only one, "Miks Bumbullis", depends for its effect upon purely national traits and circumstances. They are, for the most part, founded solidly upon the fundamental and inescapable human facts of birth and love and death. They are moving and tragic and, above all, intensely and vividly alive.

The Outlook reviewed the book:

Excursion to Tilsit by Hermann Sudermann is a collection of powerful short stories dealing with the life of Lithuanian peasants. The author has observed them sympathetically and at first hand. Nominal Catholics, they still live in fear of pagan gods, giving even their lives to propitiate them. ... Among the stories, that of Jons and Erdma who, having built a home by tricks and cunning are tricked out of it at last by their daughters, compares favorably with Turgeniev's Lear of the Steppes as a story of faith and treachery.

== Film adaptations ==
- Sunrise: A Song of Two Humans, 1927, directed by F. W. Murnau
- The Journey to Tilsit, 1939, directed by Veit Harlan
- Jons und Erdme, 1959, directed by Victor Vicas
- The Excursion to Tilsit, 1969, TV film, directed by Günter Gräwert
- Miks Bumbullis, 1971, TV film, directed by Günter Gräwert
- The Excursion to Paradise, 1980, directed by Arūnas Žebriūnas
