= Gertrud Meyen =

German actress and voice actress

- Born: 16 April 1919; Dortmund, Germany
- Died: 2012 (aged 92–93); Germany
- Occupation: Actress
- Years active: 1939-1958 (film)

Gertrud Meyen (1919–2012) was a German stage and film actress. She was also a voice actor, dubbing foreign-language films for release in Germany. She was married to the actor Heinz Engelmann.

== Selected filmography ==
- The Merciful Lie (1939)
- Midsummer Night's Fire (1939)
- Doctor Crippen (1942)
- A Beautiful Day (1944)
- Geheimakten Solvay (1953)

== Bibliography ==
- Goble, Alan. The Complete Index to Literary Sources in Film. Walter de Gruyter, 1999.
