= Anna Dammann =

German actress (1912–1993)

- Born: 19 September 1912; Hamburg, German Empire
- Died: 20 September 1993 (aged 81); Munich, Bavaria, Germany
- Occupation: Actress
- Years active: 1935-1962 (film)

Anna Dammann (19 Sept 1912 in Hamburg – 30 Sept 1993 in Munich) was a German stage and film actress. She was married to Walter Geese.

== Selected filmography ==
- Sergeant Schwenke (1935)
- The Journey to Tilsit (1939)
- Midsummer Night's Fire (1939)
- St. John's Fire (1939)
- My Life for Ireland (1941)
- Die Troerinnen des Euripides (1959)
- Nacht ohne Abshied (1943)
- My Summer Companion (1943)

== Bibliography ==
- Hull, David Stewart. Film in the Third Reich: A Study of the German Cinema, 1933-1945. University of California Press, 1969.
