= My Summer Companion =

1943 film

- Directed by: Fritz Peter Buch
- Written by: Thea von Harbou
- Based on: My Summer Companion by Klaus Erich Boerner
- Produced by: Felix Pfitzner
- Starring: Anna Dammann; Paul Hartmann; Wolfgang Lukschy
- Cinematography: Karl Hasselmann
- Edited by: Willy Zeunert
- Music by: Werner Bochmann
- Production company: Berlin Film
- Distributed by: Deutsche Filmvertriebs
- Release date: 22 March 1943
- Running time: 92 minutes
- Country: Germany
- Language: German

My Summer Companion (German: Gefährtin meines Sommers) is a 1943 German romantic drama film directed by Fritz Peter Buch and starring Anna Dammann, Paul Hartmann and Wolfgang Lukschy. It was shot at the Cinetone Studios in Amsterdam and the Filmstad in the Hague, both in the German-occupied Netherlands. Location shooting took place around the outskirts of Berlin in Brandenburg. The film's sets were designed by the art directors Hans Ledersteger and Ernst Richter.

== Synopsis ==
The celebrated pianist Angelika Rink is exhausted by her performances and returns to her home village to recuperate. There she encounters her childhood sweetheart Manfred Claudius now a doctor. Both realise they are still in love with each other, but their respective commitments to their careers mean they cannot fully embrace their feelings.

== Cast ==
- Anna Dammann as Angelika Rink, Pianistin
- Paul Hartmann as Dr. Manfred Claudius, Arzt, Jugendfreund von Angelika
- Wolfgang Lukschy as Jochen Binding, Manfreds Freund
- Eduard von Winterstein as Der alte Rink, Angelikas Vater
- O.E. Hasse as Gerhard Morton, Angelikas Verlobter
- Margarete Haagen as Fräulein Heubner, Haushälterin bei Manfred
- Viktoria von Ballasko as Hanna Polenz, Frau des Müllers
- Hans Adalbert Schlettow as Kutscher Prüschke
- Josefine Dora as Sabine, genannt Bienchen
- Ursula Voß as Mariechen, Frau des Försters
- Oscar Sabo as Dittner, ein Bauer, Dr. Claudius' Patient
- Hellmuth Passarge as Der Briefträger
- Leo Peukert as Der Imressario
- Franz-Paul Adams as Ein alter Bauer
- Ilse Cornels as Eine junge Frau nach Hannas Selbstmordversuch
- Gerhard Dammann as Ein wartender Patient vor Dr. Claudius' Haus
- Karl Dannemann as Förster Heiner Barteck
- Hugo Gau-Hamm as Ein Dorfbewoner
- Käthe Jöken-König as Eine Bäuerin
- Gustav Knuth as Georg Polenz, Müller
- Artur Malkowsky as Fährmann Bochnik
- Claire Reigbert as Die Hebamme
- Peter Strunk as Ein Dorfbewohner
- Hella Thornegg as Eine Bäuerin
- Anneliese Würtz as Eine junge Frau nach Hannas Selbstmordversuch

== Bibliography ==
- Bruns, Karin. Kinomythen 1920-1945: Die Filmentwürfe der Thea von Harbou. J.B. Metzler, 2016.
- Klaus, Ulrich J. Deutsche Tonfilme: Jahrgang 1942. Klaus-Archiv, 1988.
- Skopal, Pavel & Winkel, Roel Vande. (ed.) Film Professionals in Nazi-Occupied Europe: Mediation Between the National-Socialist Cultural “New Order” and Local Structures. Springer International Publishing, 2021.
