= A Beautiful Day (1944 film) =

1944 film

- Directed by: Philipp Lothar Mayring
- Written by: Philipp Lothar Mayring; Harald Röbbeling
- Produced by: Bernhard F. Schmidt
- Starring: Gertrud Meyen; Carsta Löck; Sabine Peters
- Cinematography: Richard Angst
- Edited by: Walter von Bonhorst
- Music by: Franz Doelle
- Production company: Tobis Film
- Distributed by: Deutsche Filmvertriebs
- Release date: 27 January 1944
- Running time: 84 minutes
- Country: Germany
- Language: German

A Beautiful Day (German: Ein schöner Tag) is a 1944 German comedy film directed by Philipp Lothar Mayring and starring Gertrud Meyen, Carsta Löck and Sabine Peters. It was shot at the Johannisthal Studios in Berlin and on location around the city. The film's sets were designed by the art directors Hans Joachim Maeder and Artur Nortmann. It was shot in 1943 when the Second World War was its height, but its tone is one of light comedy and escapism.

== Synopsis ==
Three German soldiers of the Wehrmacht are given a short leave and head to Berlin. One of them Friedrich has been receiving letters and parcels from Barbara a student who works as a bus conductor during wartime. Friedrich has neglected to tell Barbara he is married, and actually wants to spend the time in the capital with his wife Erika so he sends his single friend Fritz to meet Barbara. Because of a confusion about their names (which are similar although they are not related) she mistakenly thinks that Fritz is the married one. Ultimately the tension is resolved between this potential couple thank to the intervention of Freidrich's wife. Meanwhile the third soldier Emil, a stranger to the city, is fascinated and travels around using a guidebook.

== Main cast ==
- Gertrud Meyen as Barbara Richter
- Carsta Löck as Hedwig
- Sabine Peters as Erika Schröder
- Volker von Collande as Fritz Schröder
- Günther Lüders as Friedrich Schröder
- Jupp Hussels as Emil Heller
- Karl Dannemann as Braschke
- Ethel Reschke as Flora
- Eduard Wenck as Straßenbahnkontrolleur
- Ilse Fürstenberg as Briefträgerin
- Erwin Biegel as Friseur
- Margarete Kupfer as Frau Marunde
- Ruth Buchardt as Hilde
- Gerhard Dammann as Bürodiener
- Elsa Wagner as Hedwigs Wirtin
- Ernst Dernburg as Vorsteher der Treuhandgesellschaft
- Lotte Werkmeister as Portiersfrau
- Rosi Rauch as Singer

== Bibliography ==
- Etlin, Richard A. Art, Culture, and Media Under the Third Reich. University of Chicago Press, 2002.
- Giesen, Rolf. Nazi Propaganda Films: A History and Filmography. McFarland, 2003.
- Richards, Jeffrey. Visions of Yesterday. Routledge & Kegan Paul, 1973.
