= Frau Sorge =

Novel by Hermann Sudermann

Frau Sorge ( “Dame Care”) is the first of Hermann Sudermann's complete novels (1887) and the work which brought him his fame as a writer of fiction.

== Theme ==
The story is conceived around the imaginative legend of Frau Sorge, with which the story ends. It is the story of a mother so poor and lonely that she had no one to act as godmother for her son except Dame Care, who offers to see that the boy grows up to be a good man who shall never go hungry if his mother will give the boy's soul, with his youth and his hope of happiness, as a hostage to Dame Care.

== Critique ==
The rending of the charm by the power of a woman's love and the solemn, but never tragic, quality of the story, are distinguishing characteristics of Sudermann's work. As an art work it is the most perfect, and it is the one which shows least the wear and tear of a generation of social change. Those may be merely two ways of saying the same thing; namely, that in a writer who combines, as Sudermann does, the qualities of a poet and a realist, the more highly imaginative works have a more permanent value than the controversial ones. Into this grim tale of East Prussian peasant life, with its hint of autobiography in the spirit and the scene, if not in the story, Sudermann has infused something of the spirit of the epic: the narrative of a toiler battling against the forces of nature.
