= Deutsche Zeichentrickfilme GmbH =

Propagandic film company

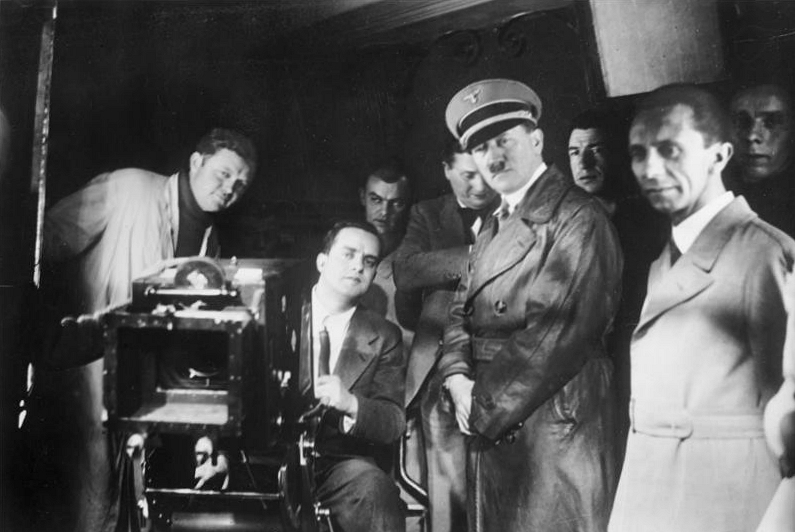
Hitler, Goebbels and other Nazi Party members watching filming in 1935

The Deutsche Zeichentrickfilme GmbH (DZF) (German animated films GmbH) was an animation production company founded on 25 June 1941 by Reich propaganda minister Joseph Goebbels. It was set up as an alternative to Disney, attempting to rival films such as Mickey Mouse, while spreading the Nazi ideology and propaganda through a less aggressive entertainment source.

== Creation ==
Goebbels wrote in his diary in 1934, "Film is one of the most modern and far-reaching media that there is for influencing the masses." This opinion led to film being used as one of the main mediums of propaganda, with the view that the Ufa needed to be expanded to utilize film for the best political gain. Goebbels believed, unlike Hitler, that art and propaganda should intermingle; leading to the creation of the Deutsche Zeichentrickfilme GmbH, with the hope that entertainment could be used to carry a political message.

Goebbels entrusted the creation of the company to Cautio Treuhand as he provided a large amount of investment, meaning there was little economic worry for the organisation. He provided monthly subsidies until June 1942, when the Ufa took over the funding. The politics of the DZF were entrusted to Oberregierungsrat Neumann who had no prior experience with animation and Dr Werner Kruse was hired as technical head, who had applied merely to avoid being drafted. Although the motives and experience of some members were questionable, due to the fact they were able to avoid military service, it has to be said that the DZF was a large operation, starting in 1941 with 6 studios, 5 chief animators, 6 female animators, 1 head of colour, 12 colourists and 14 female tracers and ending in May 1944 with 94 employees and 151 trainees.

== Early years ==
Neumann had the vision of concentrating all animation activity under one roof. This however was not agreeable with all Nazi ministers, who were sceptical this could be achieved. Neumann addressed these concerns in a letter, containing five and nine year plans of expansion and growth. In addition, he trapped employees in a contract which made them unable to quit, making sure the best animators in Germany worked for the DZF.

The pay scale can also be viewed as a reason for the attraction to the profession, as working for the DZF could generate 50-100% more income than working in the same job at another company. This is represented by how colourists at the DZF earned between 200-250 RM, but working for the Ufa- Werbefilm would only earn 120-200 RM, clearly showing how important the Nazis thought the DZF was to the war effort and Nazi regime. It also meant they could attract the best animators, with the hope to fulfil their goal of creating 19 short animations by 1947 and having the first full-length film in cinemas by 1950.

The early years of the DZF also became entangled with anti-Semitic policy. The Nuremberg laws passed by the Nazis in 1935 were not only aimed at restricting the Jewish rights and property, but also marriages between Jews and Aryans. The laws argued that any German who married a Jew was inferior and any children they bore should be treated no better than the Jews. This policy became relevant when it was found that Dr Werner Kruse had a Jewish spouse in 1942. Although he was categorised as having a 'privileged mixed-marriage' and Jews married to Aryans were not deported until 1944, this was still a tarnish to his name which the Nazis felt the need to distance themselves from. He was removed from the DZF, but continued to work for the Ufa, which demonstrates how important animators were to the regime, propaganda and the war effort. In addition to this, Kruse was able to keep his wife safe from arrest and deportation as the war progressed, further cementing the views that not only were the animators important, but that they were also powerful in the regime, due to the Nazis need for animated propaganda.

== Animations ==
Animated folk tales, such as Armer Hansi, stood at the forefront of the Deutsche Zeichentrickfilme GmbH, with the aim of glorifying peasant life. Goebbels tried to exemplify this as a German virtue, as well as promoting literature by Adolf Bartels, who presented peasant life as bedrock culture for German community. This shows peasant life was a prominent theme in Nazi culture, linking closely to the trope of the Volksgemeinschaft and clearly demonstrating why this theme is so important in DZF animations.

After Kruse was expelled from the DZF in 1942, Frank Leberecht took over the technical control of the film. Leberecht summoned a group of newspaper cartoon artists to discuss possible gags for animations. From this circle several scripts were submitted, for example, Dr. Ernst Keienburg submitted the story of a dog who wanted to be a seal. Most of the submitted ideas followed the same lines of an animal who wanted to be something else, but would then realise their true form was the best for them. This idea of sticking to the ‘status-quo’ fits in with the Nazi ideology, but the standards that the DZF held, meant that often these scripts were bought for their rights then never made or rejected altogether.

The first and only short animation film produced by the DZF was Armer Hansi released in 1943. After the idea was submitted by Hermann Krause in October 1941, work was set on modifying the plot to fit the Nazi ideology perfectly. Armer Hansi clearly shows that it is better to stay at home as he grows bored of the freedom he gained and returns to his cage. It also demonstrates dangers in the wild, representing the hazards throughout Europe, furthering the message that Germans should stay in Germany. This, like other Nazi propaganda, reinforces the idea that German's should not try and strive for adventure and individual pursuits, but to sacrifice and put their efforts to furthering the Volksgemineschaft.

Armer Hansi is said to be the closest to Disney quality the Nazis achieved, this was a main aim of Goebbels and the propaganda ministry. However he was still not happy with the quality, as seen in his diaries, ‘The first character of film, which is presented to me from his production, still shows a lot of weaknesses, but he is still a good start’. The DZF believed that it would be able to catch up to Disney despite its 20-year lead. This has been widely debated, and through the statement Goebbels made about Armer Hansi, he clearly believed that the DZF had the ability.

Work did start on a second animation, Schnuff der Nieser, starring puppies, however this was completed after the war by DEFA, the East German state film studio, due to the DZF’s fall in 1944.

== Propaganda ==
The use of animal imagery was prominent in all Nazi animation films, both those produced by Hans Fischerkoesen and the DZF. Using animal imagery was the case for many animated films of the period, such as Walt Disney's Snow White, showing that the Nazi's wanted to use popular culture and aspects of animation that they knew would draw crowds to the cinemas. This was due to the need to entertain people in order for the propaganda to be effective, it meant citizens could enjoy film as an entertainment piece, rather than a political propaganda medium, which allowed the Nazis message to be seen by a wider audience. By intertwining entertainment with political messages, it kept the public returning to view subsequent propaganda films. However, it has to be said that the majority of the tropes used within the DZF animations, such as anti-Semitism, were already firmly in place prior to the Nazis seizure of power. This can therefore explain why their animations were so successful with the public, as propaganda was meant more to reinforce existing values, rather than to convert the population to a new way of thinking. Richard Taylor argues that the Nazis inherited a passive population, which is why their propaganda was so successful. Applying this hypothesis would have meant that values were very easy to reinforce and that the Nazis could rely on entertainment value to carry their messages, compared to the more aggressive nature of the propaganda made by the Soviets.

The development of Nazi policy towards propaganda in Germany impacted the animation industry greatly. The years 1933-37 saw the co-ordination and consolidation of the industry, with Goebbels starting the nationalization process by 1937. This meant that all production, development and screening came under direct control of the Nazi party. Nationalization led many international film companies to stop distributing films in Germany, causing artists who were excluded from the Volksgemineschaft, mainly those with a Jewish background or left-wing political views to leave the country. The depletion of non-Aryans and political opponents from the film industry meant films became more "parochial and nationalistic". This relates directly to the DZF and the idealistic animations that were produced. Animations reiterated values of old Prussia and emphasised the Volk focusing clearly on the Nazi ideology.

== A rival to Disney ==
It is undisputed that Hitler was a fan of Disney. Goebbels wrote in his diaries on 22 December 1937, "I give the leader 12 Mickey Mouse films for Christmas… He is very excited and quite happy about this treasure." The DZF were determined to rival Disney, due to the high quality and clear entertainment value of the films that gripped the population.

This rivalry can be explored through the development of effects by the animation film industry in Nazi Germany. Goebbels mandated several new effects to be developed and studied, one of which was "three-dimensional" effects that can be considered to compete with Max Fleischer's Stereo-optical process or Disney’s multiplane camera. This development of techniques was a clear attempt to rival Disney and solidify Germany as one of the most advanced nations, demonstrating German superiority to not only the German population but the world. The trope of superiority and development has been evident in other propaganda, including their work programmes such as the autobahns. By continuing to advance their technology, and push their superiority through propaganda, the Nazis managed to rival the main animation distributor, whether they were even within reach of Disney's standards is something that is still debated today.

Although the DZF spent time trying to rival Disney in terms of effects and techniques, it can be questioned as to whether they were successful. Claudio Ravenstein argued that the similarities were shocking; not only due to the copied techniques, but in that Goebbels was extremely impressed with Walt Disney propaganda. However, on a business level, historians, such as Ralf Forster and Jeanpaul Goergen have stated that the company was so inefficient that it is unable to redeem claims that it was even a remote rival to Disney. Although this is accurate due to the lack of profit and erratic spending by the DZF, it has to be questioned as to whether this meant they failed, seen as their main purpose was to deliver propaganda, which they did to a high standard. As this the issue of rivalry has been widely debated in academia, it shows the importance of the topic as it was of contemporary importance to the Nazis during this period and gives the modern day audience an insight into the aims of the Goebbels and the DZF.

== Fall ==
As the Germans conquered more territory they hired talent from European countries, including France, where they recruited Robert Salvagnac, who had already been offered a job at Disney. Goebbels wrote ‘Exceptional talent in French film must be hired by us as soon as possible’, showing that the art of their propaganda was so important they were willing to hire non-Germans from occupied countries. Nevertheless, as the war progressed, and due to the large amount of able bodied workers at the DZF, employees needed to be drafted and were no longer seen as "indispensable", indicating that animation propaganda took a back seat. The DZF liquidated in July 1944, with payments from the Ufa stopping in the September and all employees were sent to work in armaments factories.

After the fall of the Third Reich in 1945 all remaining film from the DZF was confiscated by Soviet forces and remained in their possession until the fall of the Soviet Union in 1991.

== Bibliography ==
Achenbach, M. Animation in the Nazi era (history of German animated film 2). Retrieved from https://www.medienimpulse.at/articles/view/402

American-Israeli Cooperative Enterprise. The Nuremberg Laws: Background & Overview. Retrieved from https://www.jewishvirtuallibrary.org/jsource/Holocaust/nurlaws.html

Bendazzi, G. (2015). Animation: A World History: Volume I: Foundations - The Golden Age. Boca Raton, Florida: CRC Press.

Bolewski, N. (n.d). Traumschmelze – der deutsche Zeichenanimationsfilm 1930-1950. Retrieved from https://www.fktg.org/node/5140/traumschmelze

Forster, R. & Goergen, J. P. (n.d). JUNE 25, 1941 FOUNDING OF THE GERMAN MARK FILM GMBH. Retrieved from https://web.archive.org/web/20150222113929/http://www.diaf.de/de/home/rubriken/Blog_Detailseite.html?b=400

Funck, M. & Eghigian, G. & Berg, M, P. (2002). Sacrifice and National Belonging in Twentieth-Century Germany. Texas: Texas A&M University Press

Giesen, R. & Hüningen, J. (2011). German mark Film GmbH. Retrieved from http://filmlexikon.uni-kiel.de/index.php?action=lexikon&tag=det&id=2344

Giesen, R. & Storm, J.P. (2012). Animation under the swastika: a history of trickfilm in Nazi Germany, 1933-1945. Jefferson, North Carolina: McFarland & Company.

Himmelrath, A. & Hinrichs, P. & Kloth, H. M. (2008). Hitler als Cartoonist Zwölf Micky-Filme für den "Führer". Retrieved from https://www.spiegel.de/geschichte/hitler-als-cartoonist-a-949125.html

Ravenstein, C. (n.d). Nazi Propaganda in Animation. Dissertation. Retrieved from https://web.archive.org/web/20170110031117/http://www.ravensteinstudio.com/bookshop_links/NaziPropagandaInAnimation.pdf

Stachura, P. D. (2014). The Shaping of the Nazi State (RLE Nazi Germany & Holocaust). Routledge.

Taylor, R. (1998). Film Propaganda Soviet Russia and Nazi Germany. London: I. B.Tauris.

Welch, D. (2001). Propaganda and the German Cinema, 1933-1945. London: I.B. Tauris.
