= Männer gegen Panzer =

1943 film

- Distributed by: Lehrfilm
- Release date: 1943
- Running time: 28 minutes

Männer gegen Panzer (Men Against Tanks) is a 1943 German film, produced by Lehrfilm, which was used as a training film by the Wehrmacht. Its purpose was to show the German soldiers the different types of infantry anti-tank warfare. The duration of the film is 28 minutes.

The film consists of three parts. The first part shows a staged combined Soviet tank and infantry attack against entrenched German infantry. The attack is preceded by artillery and air strikes. The tanks, several T-34 model 1941/1942/1943 and a KV-1, are dealt with and destroyed by different means of improvised and dedicated anti-tank weaponry. Right and wrong approaches to destroy a tank single-handedly are displayed. At the end of the attack, Wilhelm Niggemeyer, a holder of the Knight's Cross of the Iron Cross with Oak Leaves and four tank destruction badges, is shown in action, destroying the KV-1 with a mine.

The second part shows how rear-service troops must be prepared for anti-tank warfare, as they too can encounter enemy tanks. The third part presents the Grosse Gewehrpanzergranate, Kampfpistole 42LP, Püppchen, Panzerfaust, Panzerschreck, their use and their effect against tanks.

The Soviet equipment used in the film, including uniforms and weapons, are authentic captured Soviet stock. The Soviet officer's uniforms were made before the 1943 reforms of the uniform. The only exception are the aircraft used, the AT-6, which were captured in the Battle of France.

During the Cold War the film was used for training purposes by several NATO armies.

Männer gegen Panzer is just one of many training films produced by the Wehrmacht during the war. Other examples are Der deutsche Scharfschütze (The German Sniper) or Männer gegen Männer (Men Against Men), a movie about close combat tactics.
