= Verwitterte Melodie =

1943 film

- The title card of the German cartoon.
- Directed by: Fischerkösen
- Written by: Horst von Möllendorff
- Music by: Lothar Brühne
- Release date: 6 April 1943
- Running time: 10 minutes
- Country: Nazi Germany

Verwitterte Melodie, or Weather-beaten Melody, is a 1943 animated short, made in Nazi Germany. It was written mainly by cartoonist Hans Fischerkoesen, although the sole credits often went to Horst von Möllendorff. It was animated by Jiří Brdečka in Prague.

== Plot ==
A bee finds an abandoned phonograph in a meadow and uses her stinger as a stylus to play the record on the turntable.
