= Horst von Möllendorff =

German cartoonist (1906–1992)

Horst von Möllendorff (26 April 1906 – 17 December 1992) was a German cartoonist who was "drafted" to work for the Nazis' animated short industry. He was hired as a result of former commercial animator Hans Fischerkoesen not being able to come up with adequate story ideas for his short films. Horst was pulled from his job as a popular Berlin newspaper cartoonist to become a gagman for the animation industry.

Möllendorff received authorship for at least three films:

- Verwitterte Melodie (Weather-beaten Melody), 1942
- Der Schneemann (The Snowman), 1943
- Hochzeit im Korallenmeer (Wedding in the Coral Sea), 1945
