= Wedding in the Coral Sea =

- Directed by: Jiří Brdečka; Jaroslav Kándl; Eduard Hofman; Břetislav Pojar; Václav Bedřich; Stanislav Látal; Jaroslav Doubrava; Josef Kluge
- Written by: Horst von Möllendorff
- Produced by: Zdeněk Reimann
- Cinematography: Vladimír Novotný
- Music by: Julius Kalaš
- Production company: Prag-Film
- Distributed by: Státní půjčovna filmů
- Release date: November 3, 1944
- Running time: 11 minutes
- Countries: Protectorate Bohemia and Moravia

Wedding in the Coral Sea (Czech: Svatba v korálovém moři; German: Hochzeit im Korallenmeer) is a 1944 Czech animated short film. It was written, animated and directed by a group of Czech cartoonists including Jiří Brdečka, Břetislav Pojar, Stanislav Látal and Jaroslav Doubrava in German-occupied Prague in the "Ateliér filmových triků" (AFIT) studio.

== Plot ==
The plot involves the creatures of the sea preparing for the wedding of two fish. When the fish bride is kidnapped by an octopus all the sea creatures must team up to defeat him and rescue the bride.

== Production ==
German cartoonist Horst von Möllendorff was appointed as an official director, while his role in the making of the film was in fact minimal. The film was shot on Agfacolor film material.

== Trivia ==
This was the last German animation film before the end of World War II. The film does not have any dialogue, only music.

== See also ==
- List of films made in the Third Reich
