= Der Schneemann =

1944 short film directed by Hans Fischerkoesen

- The snowman juggling early in the film
- Directed by: Hans Fischerkoesen
- Written by: Horst von Möllendorff
- Release date: 3 February 1944
- Running time: 13 minutes
- Country: Germany
- Language: German

Der Schneemann, also known as The Snowman, Snowman in July or The Magic Snowman, is a 1944 animated short film, created in Nazi Germany. It was written by cartoonist Horst von Möllendorff and animated by Hans Fischerkoesen. It was animated in Potsdam, Germany, near UFA's Neubabelsberg Studios. It was sometime later on dubbed into English by John G. Stratford as part of his Famous Tales series, and narrated by Jane Flynn who also provides the rabbit's voice, with John Flynn providing the voices of the Snowman, the clockwork bird, and the ladybug. Another English dub was provided much later by Almanac Films, Inc. and narrated by Frank Gallop.

== Plot ==
Snow falls on the snowman to form a heart shape on him. The snowman wakes and begins juggling with the snow. A dog begins chasing him and takes a bite out of him. The dog then throws snow at the snowman but this only fills the missing part of the snowman. Eventually the dog leaves.

The snowman starts skating on ice but falls through and staggers away largely melted. However, by falling down a hill and rolling in the snow the snowman reforms himself.

The snowman now falls to sleep at night. A rabbit tries to steal his carrot nose but the snowman prevents this. The snowman gets up and enters a house and finds a calendar. He finds the month July on it and then puts himself in a refrigerator so that he may see this month.

During this time, the sun makes the snow melt and gives colour to the botanical species. Meanwhile, the snowman sleeps in the refrigerator.

The snowman wakes in July. His back is stuck in the fridge. He adjusts the thermostat and waits. He leaves the refrigerator and looks for the signs of summer through the window. He embraces the season and breathes in the perfume of the flowers. He puts a pink rose in his lapel and rolls in the fields.

The snowman melts under the heat of the sun. He begin to sing "Da ist der Sommer meines Lebens..." ("that's the summer of my life") and turns into water. These are the only spoken words in the film. The rabbit from earlier mourns his loss whilst the children of the rabbit jump into the snowman's hat. He picks up the snowman's carrot and takes a bite from it.

== See also ==
- List of films made in the Third Reich
