= Hans Fischerkoesen =

German film director (1896–1973)

- Born: Hans Fischer; 18 May 1896; Bad Kösen, Saxony-Anhalt, German Empire
- Died: 23 April 1973 (aged 76); Mehlem, West Germany
- Other names: Hans Fischerkösen, Hans Fischer
- Occupation: Commercial animator

Hans Fischerkoesen, also known as Hans Fischerkösen or Hans Fischer (18 May 1896 – 23 April 1973) was a German commercial animator. Fischerkoesen is considered an animation pioneer, due to the inventions and innovations he applied to animation technology, especially the use of three-dimensional elements in his animations. Later he becomes Germany's most influential cartoonist, often nicknamed “Germany’s Walt Disney” alongside Rolf Kauka. He won both first and second prizes at a Dutch-sponsored international competition in 1937, for advertising films (the runners up included George Pal and Alexander Alexeieff ). By 1956 he had won major prizes at commercial film festivals in Rome, Milan (three times), Venice, Monte Carlo and Cannes. Most notable was the participation in the 1st Berlin International Film Festival, where Fischerkoesen's film Blick ins Paradies won the Bronze Medal (Advertising Film) award.

== Early life ==
Hans Fischer was born on 18 May 1896 in the small town of Bad Kösen, near Naumburg, at the River Saale in the German state of Saxony. Because the name “Fischer” was a very common name in the film industry, he later created the alias of Fischerkoesen, by combining his name – Fischer and his birthplace - Kösen, in order to distinguish himself from others. His father was a middle-class entrepreneur, dealing with building materials. He was a sensitive child, affected by asthma, which determined his parents to spoil both him and his sister Leni, by creating puppet shows and home entertainment, thus they developed a taste for fantasy and spectacle. Confined in bed most of his childhood by this bad case of asthma, he developed a great passion for drawing. Later, in 1916 he and his equally talented sister Leni, attended for three years the Academy of Graphic Arts, in Leipzig. Over the years, Leni was Fischerkoesen's closest collaborator on many animation film projects.

During the First World War, Fischerkoesen could not serve as a soldier because of his asthma, but he worked in army hospitals near to the front line where he witnessed the shocking horrors of trench warfare. Profoundly impressed by these terrifying experiences, at his return home when the war was ended, Fischerkoesen planned to make an animation film, Das Loch im Westen (The Hole in the West), which would expose the war profiteer as the real cause of the war. Thus, he spent months drawing about 1600 sequential images, designed his own animation stand and shot the animation movie himself, and successfully sold it to a local distributor for 3,000 marks which allowed him to pursue an animation career. Hole in the West, Fischerkoesen's first film, premiered in 1919 and made history as the first animated film ever produced in Germany.

== Commercial Animator Career ==
In 1921, Fischerkoesen launched a highly successful advertising career with an ad for the Leipzig shoe factory Nordheimer, Bummel –Petrus (Strolling Peter). In the same year he made another three animated advertising ads: Die Entführung and König Grogs Löwenabenteuer (both Transocean-Film) and Professor Sprit (Dux- Film). The success led to a two-year contract with Julius Pinschewer, owner of the leading Berlin advertising company Werbefilm G.m.b.H.-Pinschewer, who had pioneered the use of animated commercials in movie theatres back in 1911. As a result of this collaboration, he produced Die Besteigung des Himalaja (1923), Abbau auch im Harem (1924), Brand im Wolkenkratzer (1924), Glück auf! (1924), Der Glücksvogel (1924), Im Urwald (1924), Nunak, die Eskima (1924), Der Pfennig muss es bringen (1924), Sonnenersatz (1924), Das Zauberpferd (1924), Der kluge Dackel (1925), Jette’s Ausgang (1925), Meier glüht (1925), Der kluge Einfall (1925), Das Seegespenst (1925), Die Geschichte vom Scholokadenkasper (1926), Auf der Skitour (1926) and many other. Probably, the most important film of this period was Der Pfennig muss es bringen (The penny must bring it), an advertisement for the German Saving Bank and the Giro Co-operative Bank done in November 1924, which would fuel the later accusation of collaboration with the Nazi regime as both banks were to become an integral part of the Nazi plan for funding the war. Fischerkoesen worked for Pinschewer until 1928, when he temporarily worked for the propaganda film society “Epoche”, shortly after starting to work at Ufa's (Universum Film AG) propaganda department. After becoming chief draughtsman, he established his own studio in Potsdam.

In 1931, Fischerkoesen was celebrated by a Leipzig newspaper, with an article entitled “Watch out Mickey Mouse, Felix the Cat, and Co.”, article illustrated with images from his ads, such as a cow with a lyre built into her horns, a bull in a tuxedo or an Art-Deco style kangaroo ballet. He continued his successful advertising career and made over 1000 publicity films, most of which are unfortunately lost. However, he did not limit just to commercials and advertising films, but he contributed with several animated sequences to culture films and he has done as well military training films for the Army High Command (OKW) and Mars-Film G.m.b.H.

== The Nazi Era ==
Although the installation of the Nazi regime in 1933 did not affect too much of Fischerkoesen’s activity, the outbreak of the Second World War pushed his career on the verge of collapse, as the products that he had promoted so successfully were increasingly becoming luxury items. The decline was accentuated in 1941, when Joseph Goebbels, head of the Reich Ministry of Public Enlightenment and Propaganda (Reichsministerium für Volksaufklärung und Propaganda) decided, through an order issued on October 14 by the Werberat (Advertising Council of German Industry), to prohibit advertising of so-called Mangelware (scarce goods, especially food and clothes). With no future in the advertising industry, Fischerkoesen saw his career taking an unexpected turn as both Hitler and Goebbels loved cinema in general and they had a great passion for animated cartoons, especially for Walt Disney’s productions, and dreamed to create a German animated film industry bigger and better than the one in the United States. Thus, on 25 June 1941 Goebbels founded a new animated film company Deutsche Zeichentrickfilme G.m.b.H (DZF), regarded as an important war facility which offered training for young cartoonists.

The German Animation Film Company (DZF) was aimed to start the production of feature-length animated films by 1947 and the successful animator Fischerkoesen was a natural choice to be involved in this strategic project. In this context, Fischerkoesen was required to move his staff and studio to Potsdam, near UFA’s studios. Fischerkoesen did not reject a collaboration with the Nazi propaganda machine, but he argued that he was not really talented to invent ideas for story films as he was experienced in the advertising industry. Consequently, he was assigned to work with Horst von Mollendorf, a popular Berlin newspaper cartoonist who was expected to help him with the scrips for the future animations. In these circumstances, Fischerkoesen was commissioned by Goebbels to create cartoons that were technologically equal or better than Disney’s animations, and received enough funding to produce his three most important and costly films: Die Verwitterte Melodie (Weather-Beaten Melody) in 1942, Der Schneemann (The Snowman) in 1943 and Das dumme Gänslein (The Silly Goose) in 1944. All three films respected Goebbels’ directives, as they were made without spoken dialogue, so it was easy to be played internationally without costly subtitles synchronisation, and used the “three dimensional” effects (especially The Snowman was highly appreciated during the rule of the National Socialists).

Weather-Beaten Melody or Scherzo tells the story of a wasp who discovers an abandoned gramophone in a meadow and, with its stinger manages to make it play the Foxtrott Wenn die Woche keinen Sonntag hätt (If the Week had no Sunday). Der Schneemann presents the adventures of a special snowman, a “humanly” one with a warm spot in his heart who after seeing pictures with the summer in a calendar, decided to see the warm season at any costs and ended melted in July. For the last short animation of the series, The Silly Goose, Fischerkoesen preferred to renounce his collaboration with Horst von Mollendorf, and produced the film on his own. The film tells the story of a vain goose who ventures beyond the borders of the farmhouse where she lived and nearly ended killed by a fox. In contrast to the first two short animations, in this last film can be noticed several antisemitic symbols, such as the fox who represents the “malicious Jew”, or the well-known Yiddish song Bei Mir Bistu Shein played in the background while the fox attempt to ambush the undisciplined goose.

The animations satisfied Goebbels’ expectations, thanks to their technical qualities and to the message transmitted, similar to the Nazi ideology of Blut und Boden (Blood and Soil), which glorified the simplicity and the virtue of the rural life, the return to the nature and required everyone to stay where they belong. On the other hand, elements which indicate a relative insubordination to the Nazi rhetoric can be found, such as the forbidden jazz music in Die verwitterte Melodie, the snowman’s anticipation of better days in Der Schneemann or the ambiguous narrative created in Das Dumme Ganslein.

== Post Second World War Career ==
When the Second World War ended, Fischerkösen was arrested by the Russian troops under the suspicion of Nazi collaboration and was kept for three years in the Sachsenhausen concentration camp, until he proved not just that he was not a Nazi sympathizer, but that he was actually part of an underground resistance group of artists. During the imprisonment time he was detached to work in the kitchen and in order to survive captivity he occasionally drew portraits of the Soviet guards in exchange for a piece of bread, or to maintain a good morale he painted allegorical murals using vegetable caricatures, which are now preserved as a national historical monument. Released in 1948, Fischerkoesen fled with his wife and two children from the Soviet-controlled zone of Germany to the French-controlled sector, where he returned to his pre-Nazi career, founding Fischerkoesen-Studios in Mehlem. He became Germany’s leading producer of animated commercials and his notoriety and success was recognized by a cover story in Der Spiegel, on 29 August 1956. In 1958, he created Onkel Otto, a Harbor seal as the mascot for Hessischer Rundfunk. By the mid-1960s, due to the development of television and the request for shorter and snappier clips, Fischerkoesen found it more difficult to keep up with the modern times, thus his commercials became briefer. Fischerkoesen Studios were closed in 1972, just a year before his death, but his son reorganized it and developed it into a new company. Hans Fischerkösen died of a stroke at the age of 76, on 25 April 1973.

== Filmography ==
- 1919: Das Loch im Westen (The Hole in the West)
- 1921: Bummel-Petrus (Strolling Peter)
- 1922: Seemansliebe (Sailors Love)
- 1923: Die Besteigung des Himalaja (Climbing of the Himalaya)
- 1924: Der Pfennig muß es bringen (The penny must bring it)
- 1925: Der Kluge Einfall (The Clever Idea)
- 1926: Die Geschichte vom Schokoladenkasper (The History of Chocolate Kasper)
- 1927: Auf der Skitour (On the Ski Tour)
- 1928: Zur gefälligen Beachtung (For Your Attention)
- 1929: Der möblierte Herr (The Furnished Mister)
- 1930: Tanztee (Tea Dance)
- 1933: Schall und Rauch (Smoke and Mirrors)
- 1934: Vertrag mit der Hölle (The Contract with the Hell)
- 1935: Das blaue Wunder (The Blue Wonder)
- 1936: Gesang des Kragenknopfes (Song of the Collar Button)
- 1937: Zwei Minuten von Bedeutung (Two Minutes of Importance)
- 1938: Dicke Luft (Thick Air)
- 1940: Im Glückshimmel (In Happiness Heaven)
- 1942: Verwitterte Melodie (Weather-Beaten Melody)
- 1944: Der Schneemann (The Snowman)
- 1944: Das dumme Gänslein (The Silly Goose)
- 1944: La Prairie Enchantée (French title for The Enchanted Meadow, projected in color in 1944 at Paris)
- 1951: Blick ins Paradies (Looking into Paradise)
- 1955: Durch Nacht zum Licht (Through Night to Light)
- 1964: Die Kleine Null (The Little Zero)
