= Hermann Sudermann =

German dramatist and novelist (1857–1928)

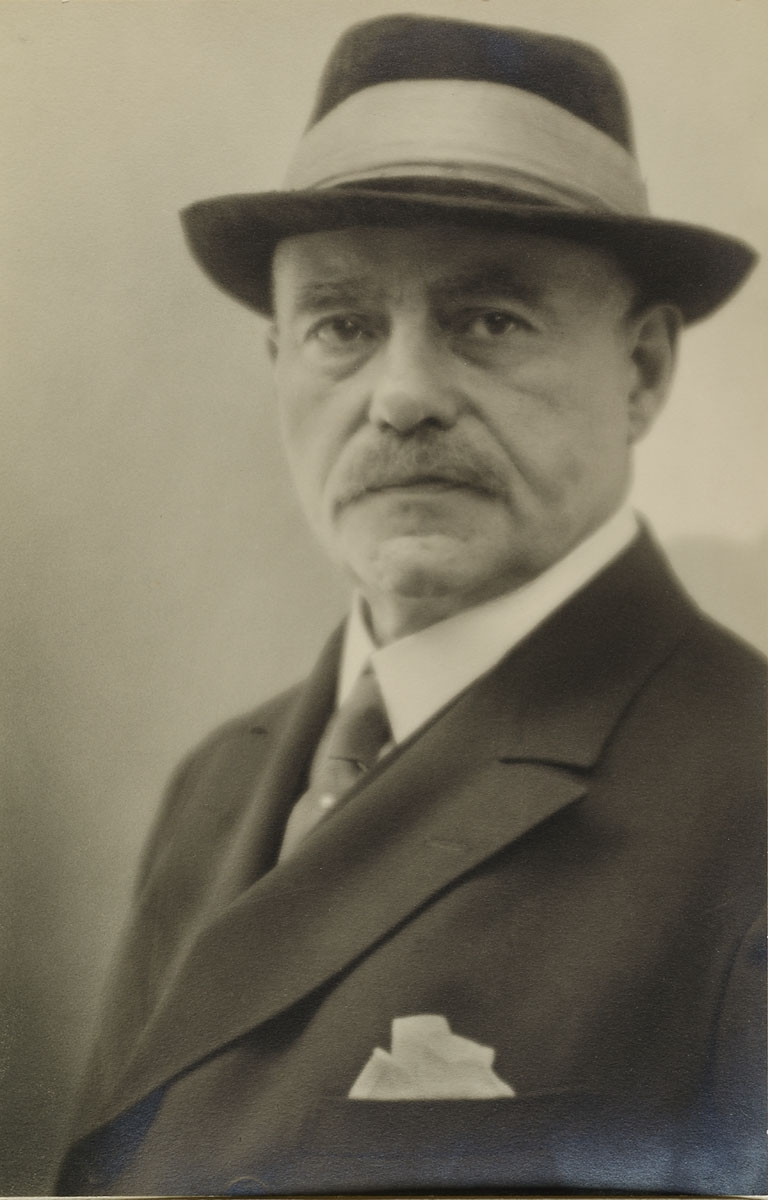
- Born: 30 September 1857; Matzicken, Prussia
- Died: 21 November 1928 (aged 71); Berlin, Germany
- Occupations: Dramatist and Novelist
- Spouse: Clara Lauckner (1861-1924)
- Writing career
- Notable works: Heimat (play); Frau Sorge (novel)

Signature
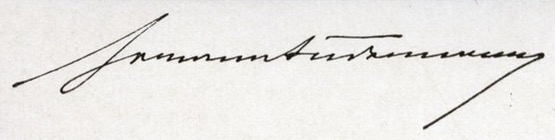

Hermann Sudermann (30 September 1857 – 21 November 1928) was a German dramatist and novelist.

== Life ==
=== Early career ===
Sudermann was born at Matzicken, a village to the east of Heydekrug in the Province of Prussia (now Macikai, in southwestern Lithuania), close to the Russian frontier. The Sudermanns were a Mennonite family from the Vistula delta Mennonite communities near the former Elbing, East Prussia, (now Elbląg, Poland).

His father owned a small brewery in Heydekrug, and Sudermann received his early education at the Realschule in Elbing, where he lived with his relatives and attended the Mennonite church where his uncle was the minister. His parents having been reduced in circumstances, he was apprenticed to a chemist at the age of 14. He was, however, able to enter the Realgymnasium (high school) in Tilsit, and to study philosophy and history at Königsberg University.

In order to complete his studies Sudermann went to Berlin, where he was tutor to several families, including the family of the author Hans Hopfen (1835–1904). Next he became a journalist, and was in 1881 and 1882 the co-editor of the Deutsches Reichsblatt. He then devoted himself to fiction, beginning with a collection of naturalistic short stories called Im Zwielicht ("At Twilight", 1886), and the novels Frau Sorge ("Dame Care", 1887), Geschwister ("Siblings", 1888) and Der Katzensteg ("Cats' Bridge", 1890). These works failed to bring the young author as much recognition as his first drama, Die Ehre ("Honour", 1889), which inaugurated a new period in the history of the German stage. This play, originally intended to be a tragedy, but on Blumenthal's advice given a "happy ending," was a pseudo-Nietzschean attack on the morality of the lowly.

He married the novelist Clara Lauckner (1861–1924), née Schulz on 20 October 1891 and lived with his family in Berlin-Wannsee. She was a widow and already had three children from her previous short-lived marriage, and she then had one child with Sudermann: a daughter, Hede. They lived in Königsberg for the next two years, before moving to Dresden and then Berlin in 1895.

=== Fame ===
He had a large following in Japan. During the 20th century, his plays were the basis of more than 30 films.

Heimat (1893), another successful drama, was translated into English as Magda (1896). In this play, Sudermann emphasizes the right of the artist to a freer moral life than that of the petty bourgeoisie. It has some of the moralistic and didactic tendency of the later French dramatists, especially the younger Dumas, and all of their technical finesse. Productions featured some of the best known actresses of the time, including Helena Modjeska, Sarah Bernhardt, Eleonora Duse, and Mrs Patrick Campbell.

In 1894 Sudermann returned to novels with Es War (the title referring to Section 2, §1 of Nietzsche's Unzeitgemässe Betrachtungen), a protest against the fruitlessness of brooding repentance. In 1902, he moved to a mansion with extensive grounds at Blankensee, and used his new-found wealth to collect paintings and sculpture, and to take trips to Italy, Greece, Egypt and India.

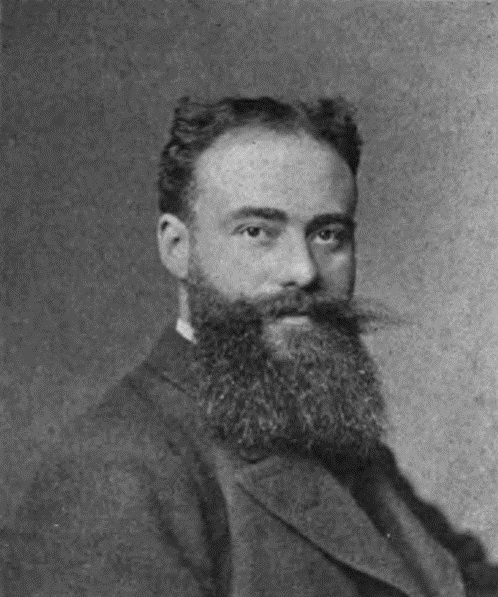
Portrait of Sudermann

At the commencement of World War I, Sudermann was enthusiastic, publishing a Kaiserlied ("Song of the Kaiser"). In autumn 1917, he organised the Frohe Abende ("Cheery Evenings"), a program promoting artistic endeavors among the common people, for which he received an Iron Cross Second Class on 5 April 1918. After the end of the war, he helped found the Bund schaffender Künstler ("Society of Creative Artists"), which posed as a centrist political force and which earned him the reputation of an opportunist.

The most important of his later works are Litauische Geschichten ("Lithuanian Stories", 1917, translated as The Excursion to Tilsit), a realistic portrait of his homeland, and a volume of memoirs in 1922. His last major work, written after the death of his wife in 1924, was Die Frau des Steffen Tromholt ("The Wife of Steffen Tromholt", 1927), a semi-autobiographical novel, which turned into a movie in 1929 titled Wonder of Women. He had a stroke in 1928, and died of a lung infection shortly afterwards, in Berlin, aged 71. His stepson Rolf Lauckner set up the Hermann Sudermann Foundation to support young dramatists.

=== Posthumous reputation ===
Sudermann's nationalism, and his delight in romanticized ideas of ethnicity and homeland, particularly noticeable in his later works, made him a favorite during World War II. After 1945, his plays and novels were almost completely forgotten. He mainly is remembered today for his Lithuanian stories, for his autobiography, and for the 1927 silent films Sunrise: A Song of Two Humans, based on his short story Die Reise nach Tilsit ("The Excursion to Tilsit"), from the Collection Litauische Geschichten (Lithuanian Stories), The Song of Songs, starring Marlene Dietrich, based on his novel Das Hohe Lied and Flesh and the Devil, starring Greta Garbo, based on his novel The Undying Past.

== Works ==
- Im Zwielicht: Zwanglose Geschichten ("At Twilight", short stories, 1886)
- Frau Sorge ("Dame Care", novel, 1887; translated by Bertha Overbeck (1857-1928) in 1891)
- Geschwister: Zwei Novellen ("Siblings: Two Stories", novellas, 1888)
  - Die Geschichte der stillen Mühle ("The Tale of the Idle Millstone", novella)
  - Der Wunsch ("The Wish", novella; translated by Lily Henkel (1860-1933) in 1894)
- Die Ehre ("Honour", play, 1889/91)
- Der Katzensteg ("Cats' Bridge", novel, 1890; translated by Beatrice Marshall (1861-1944) in 1898 as "Regina or the Sins of the Fathers")
- Sodoms Ende ("Sodom's End", play, 1891), a tragedy of artistic life in Berlin
- Jolanthes Hochzeit ("Iolanthe's Wedding", novel, 1892; translated by Adele S. Seltzer (d.1940) in 1918), a humorous novel which breathes the serener realism of common life
- Heimat ("Homeland", play, 1893; translated by C. E. A. Winslow in 1896 as "Magda")
- Es War ("It Was", novel, 1894; translated by Beatrice Marshall in 1906 as "The Undying Past")
- Die Schmetterlingsschlacht ("Battle of the Butterflies", comedy play, 1895) (Digital edition from 1904 by the University and State Library Düsseldorf)
- Das Glück im Winkel ("Happiness in a Quiet Corner", 1896)
- Morituri (three one-act plays, 1896)
  - Teja, Fritzchen, Das Ewig-Männlich ("The Eternal Masculine")
- Johannes (tragic play about John the Baptist, 1898)
- Die drei Reiherfedern ("Three Heron-Feathers", play, 1899)
- Drei Reden ("Three Lectures", 1900)
- Johannisfeuer (Fires of St. John, 1900)
- Es lebe das Leben! ("Let Life Live!", 1902; translated by Edith Wharton in 1903 as "The Joy of Living")
- Verrohung der Theaterkritik (1902)
- Der Sturmgeselle Sokrates ("Stormfellow Socrates", comedic play, 1903)
  - Die Sturmgesellen: Ein Wort zur Abwehr ("Stormfellows: a Defence", essay, 1903)
- Stein unter Steinen ("Stone Among Stones", 1905)
- Das Blumenboot ("The Flower Boat", 1905)
- Rosen ("Roses", four one-act plays, 1907; translated by Grace Frank in 1912, the last with the title "The Faraway Princess")
  - Die Lichtbänder ("Streaks of Light")
  - Margot
  - Der letzte Besuch ("The Last Visit")
  - Die Feen-Prinzessin ("The Fairy Princess")
- Das hohe Lied ("The Song of Songs", novel, 1908; translated by Thomas Seltzer in 1910 and by Edward Sheldon in 1914)
- Strandkinder ("Beach Children", 1909)
- Der Bettler von Syrakus ("The Beggar of Syracuse", 1911)
- Die indische Lilie ("The Indian Lily", short story, 1911; translated by Ludwig Lewisohn in 1911)
- Der gute Ruf ("The Good Name", 1912)
- Die Lobgesänge des Claudian ("Hymns to Claudian", 1914)
- Die entgötterte Welt ("The Godless World", 1915)
- Litauische Geschichten ("Lithuanian Stories", short stories, 1917; reprinted 1984, 1985, 1989), translated by Lewis Galantière in 1930 as The Excursion to Tilsit
  - Die Reise nach Tilsit
  - Miks Bumbullis
  - Jons und Erdine
  - Die Magd
- Die Raschoffs ("The Raschoffs", 1919)
- Der Hüter der Schwelle ("Watcher at the Step", 1921)
- Das deutsche Schicksal ("The German Destiny", 1921)
- Jons und Erdme: eine litauische Geschichte ("Jons and Erdme: a Lithuanian Tale", 1921)
- Das Bilderbuch meiner Jugend: Autobiographie ("The Picture Book of my Youth", autobiography, 1922; reprinted, Ernst Osterkamp, ed., 1980, 1988)
- Wie die Träumenden ("Like Dreamers", 1923)
- Die Denkmalsweihe ("Ceremony at the Monument", 1923)
- Der tolle Professor: Roman aus der Bismarckzeit ("The Mad Professor: a Novel of the Bismarck Years", 1926; translated by Isabel Leighton in 1929)
- Der Hasenfellhändler ("The Trader of Hareskins", 1927)
- Die Frau des Steffen Tromholt ("The Wife of Steffen Tromholt", novel, 1927)
- Purzelchen (1928)
