= Walter Riml =

Walter Riml (September 23, 1905 – June 21, 1994) was an Austrian cameraman and actor.

== Life ==
Born in Innsbruck, the 2.05 m tall Tyrolean at first was trained as a carpenter and an interior designer. As a passionate sportsman and skier he contacted the Mountain film-pioneer Arnold Fanck who made a film in the Tyrolean area of Arlberg in 1927. Fanck engaged him as a grip for the silent movie The Great Leap where Walter Riml appeared also in some short scenes. Fanck loved the artistic and humorous side of Walter Riml's talents and so he played a major role in Fanck's famous film The White Ecstasy (1931). Together with other already famous actors like Leni Riefenstahl, Hannes Schneider, Rudi Matt, Gustav Diessl and the pilot Ernst Udet Walter Riml played also in Abenteuer im Engadin or S.O.S. Eisberg and showed his further talent for the film business in The White Ecstasy.

Walter Riml played the tall carpenter "Fietje" from Hamburg together with his petite carpenter-partner "Tietje" Guzzi Lantschner, both in the traditional black woodworker costumes. Their ski acrobatic scenes became legendary until today. This film is also a favourite film for today's snowboarding generation because of the fabulous ski jumps.

Another film with these two comedians was North Pole, Ahoy filmed in Greenland, directed by Andrew Marton, produced by Universal Films. This film was a parodistic story in connection with S.O.S. Eisberg. Walter Riml was interested in becoming a professional cameraman and very soon into his career he got his visual education from two famous cameramen Hans Schneeberger and Richard Angst. Because of his visual talents Leni Riefenstahl committed to him as her still-photographer and as a second cameraman for her first movie Das blaue Licht (The Blue Light). The most famous photos of Leni Riefenstahl as the witch "Junta" from this film were shot by Walter Riml. This fact she mentioned in her book "Im Kampf in Schnee und Eis". Walter Riml became a great cameraman and expert for mountain films. Therefore, Luis Trenker engaged him several times. In the 30es, Walter Riml filmed in Japan Die Tochter des Samurai (1936) together with Arnold Fanck.

Because of a bomb attack in 1944 in Berlin he lost his archive with more than 30,000 negatives from his travels and works in Japan and Greenland. Therefore, planned film projects together with the American film producer Paul Kohner could not be realised any more.

After the Second World War he was a cameraman for the US Army. In 1957 he was one of the four western cameramen who were allowed to make a film about the daily life in Russia. Riml also worked on different TV productions.

Until the mid-1960s Walter Riml made a lot of the typical and famous mountain films and films with regional background. One of them is the famous film Two Times Lotte based on the book by Erich Kästner. In 1962 the American director John Sturges engaged him as a second cameraman for his film The Great Escape with stars like Steve McQueen, Richard Attenborough and Charles Bronson. As a specialist for films in snow atmosphere he filmed scenes in the James Bond film On Her Majesty's Secret Service in 1969. His last filmwork was in 1970, a documentary for American television about the film The Last Valley with Michael Caine and Omar Sharif.

Walter Riml died at the age of 89 in the year 1994 in Steinach am Brenner. In his long life he worked on more than 100 film productions and documentaries worldwide.

== List of films ==
=== Actor ===
- 1927: The Great Leap
- 1931: The White Ecstasy
- 1932: Adventures in the Engadin
- 1933: S.O.S. Eisberg
- 1934: North Pole, Ahoy
- 1934: Der König des Montblanc
- 1934: The Eternal Dream
- 1952: Carnival in White

=== Cameraman ===
- 1930: Storm over Mont Blanc (Camera assistant)
- 1930: The Blue Light (2nd Camera, Stills)
- 1931: The White Ecstasy (Camera assistant)
- 1932: Abenteuer im Engadin (Camera assistant)
- 1932/33: S.O.S. Eisberg (Camera assistant)
- 1932/33: North Pole, Ahoy (Camera assistant)
- 1934: Der König des Montblanc (Camera assistant)
- 1934: Triumph of the Will
- 1935: Ikerasak
- 1935: Anschlag auf Schweda
- 1935: Purzelbaum ins Glück
- 1936: Das große Eis
- 1936: Reis und Holz im Lande des Mikado
- 1936/41: Frühling in Japan (Documentary)
- 1936/41: Japan's heiliger Vulkan (Documentary)
- 1936: Tapfere kleine Mitsuko
- 1936: Peter im Schnee
- 1937: The Daughter of the Samurai
- 1937: Hänschen Klein
- 1937: The Mountain Calls
- 1938: Der König der Berge (Documentary)
- 1938: Love Letters from Engadin
- 1938: Steputat & Co.
- 1938: Spiel im Sommerwind
- 1939: In the Name of the People
- 1939: Hochzeit mit Hindernissen
- 1939: Who's Kissing Madeleine?
- 1939: Alarm at Station III
- 1939: Weißer Flieder
- 1943: Josef Thorak – Werkstatt und Werk (Documentary)
- 1944: Harte Zeit, starke Kunst – Arno Breker (Documentary)
- 1944: Atlantik-Wall (Documentary)
- 1945: Sonderberichter (Camera) US Army, Division 777
- 1946/47: Wintermelodie
- 1947: Singende Engel
- 1948: Zyankali
- 1948: Anni
- 1948: Die Verjüngungskur / Nach Regen folgt Sonne
- 1948: Die Frau am Weg
- 1948: White Gold
- 1949: Hexen
- 1949: Das Kind der Donau
- 1950: Der geheimnisvolle Wilddieb (The Mysterious Poacher)
- 1950: Die Grenze
- 1950: The Lone Climber
- 1950: Two Times Lotte
- 1951: Night on Mont Blanc
- 1951: Stadtpark / Kleiner Peter, große Sorgen
- 1952: Carnival in White
- 1952: The Landlady of Maria Wörth
- 1953: Young Heart Full of Love
- 1954: Rose-Girl Resli
- 1954: The Silent Angel
- 1955: The Major and the Bulls
- 1955: As Long as You Live
- 1956: Fruit in the Neighbour's Garden
- 1957: The Twins from Zillertal
- 1957: Kleren maken de man
- 1957: Egon, der Frauenheld
- 1957: Almenrausch and Edelweiss
- 1957: Wir sahen mit unseren Augen: Russland heute (Documentary)
- 1958: Heimatlos
- 1958: Worüber man nicht spricht – Frauenarzt Dr. Brand greift ein
- 1959: Heimat – Deine Lieder
- 1960: Town Without Pity (uncredited)
- 1960: Armored Command (2.Camera)
- 1962: Schneewittchen und die sieben Gaukler
- 1962: The Great Escape
- 1963: Sturm am Wilden Kaiser / Bergwind
- 1968: Chitty Chitty Bang Bang (uncredited)
- 1969: James Bond 007 - On Her Majesty's Secret Service (Specialist for filming mountain and snowscenes)
- 1970: The Last Valley (Documentary for the US TV)

== Literature ==
- Gesprengte Ketten: The Great Escape, Behind the Scenes, Photographs of cameraman Walter Riml, Editor Helma Türk & Christian Riml, House Publishing 2013, English/German
