= Der Kaiser von Kalifornien =

1936 German western film

The Kaiser of California
- Directed by: Luis Trenker
- Screenplay by: Luis Trenker
- Starring: Luis Trenker
- Distributed by: Tobis Film
- Release date: 1936
- Country: Germany
- Language: German

Der Kaiser von Kalifornien ('The Emperor of California') is a 1936 film that was the first Western film made in Nazi Germany. Some exterior scenes were shot on location in the United States at Sedona, Arizona, the Grand Canyon, and Death Valley in California.

== Plot ==
The film follows the life story of Johann Augustus Sutter, the owner of Sutter's Mill, famous as the birthplace of the great California Gold Rush of 1849. However much of the story re-writes the actual history of Sutter. While the basic story of Sutter's life is retained, the producers inserted some notable changes reflecting the political environment of the film's creation: though Sutter was a Swiss-German, the film emphasizes his German ethnicity, and though he changed his name to John when he came to the United States, throughout the film he retains the name Johann.

The film juxtaposes the "easy" money of gold-digging with the wealth and values created by hard work, as the gold rush eventually destroys Sutter's fortunes while promoting social disintegration and the loss of solidarity and companionship.

In the final scene the aged and impoverished Sutter is shown in Washington, D.C., where he has a vision of America's future industrial might, seeing a land full of skyscrapers and factories.

Unlike most American Westerns of the 1930s, The Emperor of California offers a sympathetic portrait of the Native Americans, whom Sutter respectfully befriends. In this it follows the Karl May tradition of German Western stories, which often featured noble Native Americans and German immigrants turned pioneers and gunmen.

== Cast ==
- Luis Trenker as Johann August Sutter
- Viktoria von Ballasko as Anna, his wife
- Werner Kunig as Rudolf, their son
- Karli Zwingmann as Emil, their son
- Elise Aulinger as Frau Dübol, Anna's mother
- Bernhard Minetti as a stranger
- Hans Zesch-Ballot as Governor Alvaredo
- Marcella Albani as Alvaredo's wife
- Walter Franck as Castro, Alvaredo's adjutant
- Reinhold Pasch as Marshall (as Reginald Pasch)
- August Eichhorn as Harper
- Luis Gerold as a laborer
- Paul Verhoeven as Billy, a barman
- Melanie Horeschowsky as Amalie, Sutter's sister (as Melanie Horeschovsky)
- Berta Drews as a singer
- Alexander Golling as Kewen, the mayor of San Francisco
- Heinrich Marlow as Judge Thompson
- Rudolf Klein-Rogge as a banker
- Otto Stoeckel as a banker (as Otto Stockel)
- Bruno Ziener as a banker
- Josef Reithofer as a police officer
- Jakob Sinn as a police officer
- Erich Dunskus as Smith, a casino owner
- Armin Schweizer as a coachman

== Production ==
The film was loosely based on the 1925 book L'Or by Blaise Cendrars. The screenplay was written and directed by the Tyrolean Luis Trenker, who also starred as Johann Sutter. Trenker had previously directed Der verlorene Sohn (The Prodigal Son, 1934), the story of an Alpine immigrant in New York City, which is the only other film produced in Nazi Germany with scenes photographed on location in the United States.

== Awards and honors ==
The film won the 1936 Mussolini Cup for best foreign film at the Venice Film Festival. It was screened as part of the "Venice Days" series at the 68th Venice International Film Festival in September 2011.

Hitler attended the film's German premiere. When the film was released in the United States, The New York Times gave it a positive review on May 8, 1937. However it never reached any commercial success.

== See also ==
- List of films made in the Third Reich
- Nazism and cinema
- Sutter's Gold, 1936 film
