= The Rebel (1932 film) =

1932 German film

- Theatrical release poster
- Directed by: Curtis Bernhardt; Edwin H. Knopf; Luis Trenker
- Written by: Walter Schmidtkunz; Robert A. Stemmle; Henry Koster (uncredited)
- Story by: Luis Trenker
- Produced by: Paul Kohner; Joe Pasternak; Alfred Stern
- Starring: Luis Trenker; Luise Ullrich; Victor Varconi
- Cinematography: Sepp Allgeier; Albert Benitz; Willy Goldberger; Reimar Kuntze
- Edited by: Hermann Haller; Andrew Marton
- Music by: Giuseppe Becce
- Production company: Deutsche Universal-Film
- Distributed by: Deutsche Universal-Film
- Release date: 22 December 1932 (Germany)
- Running time: 82 minutes
- Country: Germany
- Language: German

The Rebel (German: Der Rebell) is a 1932 German historical drama film directed by Curtis Bernhardt, Edwin H. Knopf, and Luis Trenker and starring Trenker, Luise Ullrich, and Victor Varconi. The film's art direction was by Fritz Maurischat. A separate English language version, The Rebel, was released the following year. The film is part of the mountain film genre.

Trenker stated that the film's plotline of a Tyrolean mountaineer, Severin Anderlan, leading a revolt against occupying French forces in 1809, during the Napoleonic Wars. Andreas Hofer, the noted Tirolean patriot, was a proto-type of "Severin Anderlan" (both died in the same year). Trenker was designed to mirror what was happening in contemporary Germany, as it rejected the terms of the Treaty of Versailles. In 1933 Luis Trenker's novel Der Rebell. Ein Freiheitsroman aus den Bergen Tirols was published.

Trenker later made a second film about the Tyrolean Rebellion The Fire Devil in 1940.

== Cast ==
- Luis Trenker as Severin Anderlan
- Luise Ullrich as Erika Rieder
- Victor Varconi as Kapitän Leroy, Oberkommandant von St. Vigil
- Ludwig Stössel as Riederer, Amtshauptmann von St. Vigil
- Olga Engl as Severins Mutter
- Erika Dannhoff as Gerrud Anderlan
- Fritz Kampers as Offizier Raidthofer
- Arthur Grosse as General Drouet
- Amanda Lindner as Frau Drouet
- Albert Schultes as Jakob Harrasser
- Reinhold Bernt as Krahvogel
- Otto Kronburger as Pater Mdardus
- Emmerich Albert as Bergführer Hagspiel
- Hans Jamnig as Bergführer Klotz
- Hugo Lehner as Französischer Soldat
- Luis Gerold as Bergführer Rabenstein
- Inge Conradi as Kathrin, Hagspiel's Freundin

== Production ==
Following Trenker's appearance in Universal Pictures' Doomed Battalion, they engaged him to appear in several more films with The Rebel being the first. There were planned to be three versions: English, German and French. Victor Varconi signed to appear in the English and German versions. Esther Ralston was originally signed as the lead in the English version, but Vilma Bánky replaced her.

The German version was made by the German subsidiary of Universal.

location shooting in Austria and St. Moritz, and Zuoz, Switzerland. Interior scenes were filmed at the Tempelhof Studios in Berlin.

Sepp Allgeier was one of four cameramen who shot the film.

== Reception ==
Joseph Goebbels and Adolf Hitler watched the film on 18 January 1933. Goebbels praised the film as what Nazi filmmakers should aspire to.

== Works cited ==
- Hull, David (1969). Film in the Third Reich: Art and Propaganda in Nazi Germany. Simon & Schuster. SBN 671214861.
- Prawer, Siegbert Salomon (2005). Between Two Worlds: The Jewish Presence in German and Austrian Film, 1910–1933. New York: Berghahn Books. ISBN 978-1-84545-074-8.
- Welch, David (1983). Propaganda and the German Cinema: 1933-1945. I.B. Tauris. ISBN 9781860645204.
