= The Immortal Vagabond =

The Immortal Vagabond may refer to:

- The Immortal Vagabond (1930 film), a 1930 German musical film
- The Immortal Vagabond (1953 film), a 1953 West German musical drama film
