= Claus Clausen (actor) =

German actor

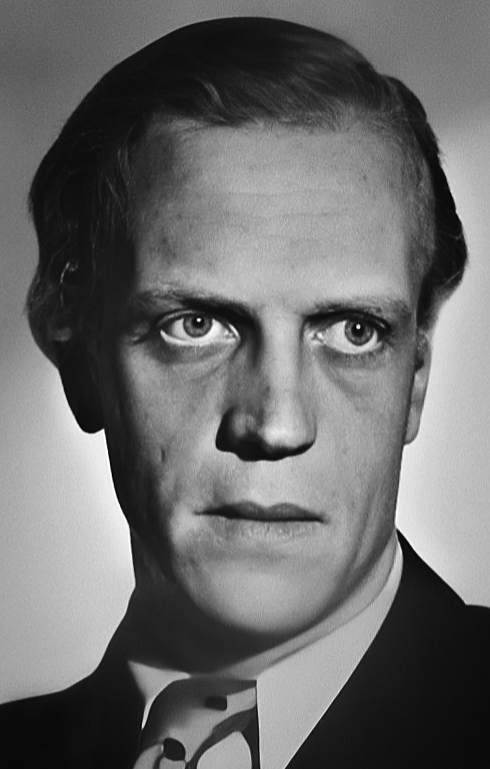
- Born: 15 August 1899; Eisenach, German Empire
- Died: 25 November 1989 (aged 90); Essen, West Germany
- Occupation: Actor
- Years active: 1930–1968

Claus Clausen (15 August 1899 – 25 November 1989) was a German film actor. He appeared in more than 21 films between 1930 and 1968.

== Selected filmography ==
- Westfront 1918 (1930) as The Lieutenant
- Cyanide (1930) as Max
- Scapa Flow (1930)
- Scandalous Eva (1930) as Schlotterbeck
- Mountains on Fire (1931) as Lieutenant Kall
- Doomed Battalion (1932) as Lieutenant Kall (archive footage)
- Hitlerjunge Quex (1934) as Brigade Leader Kass
- The Old and the Young King (1935) as Lieutenant Katte
- A German Robinson Crusoe (1940) as Fritz Grothe
- The Fire Devil (1940)
- My Life for Ireland (1941) as Patrick Pollock
- The Great King (1942) as Prince Henry the Older
- Kolberg (1945) as Frederick William III of Prussia
- The Devil Makes Three (1952) as Heisemann
- The Cornet (1956) as General Graf Spork
- Bel Ami (1968, TV film) as Norbert de Varenne
