= Harry Sokal =

Harry Sokal may refer to:

- Harry R. Sokal (1898–1979), Romanian-born German film producer
- Harry Sokal (musician) (born 1954), Austrian jazz saxophonist
