= Reckless Living =

Reckless Living may refer to:

- Reckless Living (1931 film), an American pre-Code drama film
- Reckless Living (1938 film), an American comedy film
