= Trenker =

Trenker may refer to:

- 17489 Trenker, an asteroid discovered on October 2, 1991
- Luis Trenker (1892–1990), a film producer, actor, and alpinist (after whom the asteroid was named)
