= Adventures in the Engadin =

1932 film directed by Max Obal

- Directed by: Max Obal
- Written by: Arnold Fanck; Helmuth Orthmann; Ludwig von Wohl
- Produced by: Harry R. Sokal; Gabriel Levy
- Starring: Walter Riml; Guzzi Lantschner; Hella Hartwich
- Cinematography: Richard Angst; Heinrich Gärtner; Hans Schneeberger
- Edited by: Munni Obal
- Music by: Paul Dessau
- Production company: Sokal Film
- Distributed by: Aafa Film
- Release date: 8 December 1932
- Running time: 87 minutes
- Country: Germany
- Language: German

Adventures in the Engadin (German: Abenteuer im Engadin) is a 1932 German sports comedy film directed by Max Obal and starring Walter Riml, Guzzi Lantschner and Hella Hartwich. Much of the film was shot on location in the resort town of Arosa. It was based on a story by Arnold Fanck, the noted director of Mountain films. The film's sets were designed by the art directors Bruno Lutz and Karl Weber. It is also known by the alternative title Slalom.

== Synopsis ==
Hella's engagement to Harry falls apart as he is a winter sports enthusiast who pays her no attention due to his obsession with skiing. Deciding to take to the slopes to discover what fascinates him, she travels to the Engadin valley in the Swiss Alps. In the company of two genial fellows from Hamburg, she learns to ski successfully and decides to enter a competition - where she runs into Harry again.

== Cast ==
- Walter Riml as Zimmermann I
- Guzzi Lantschner as Zimmermann II
- Hella Hartwich as Hella Martens
- Arnold Hasenclever as Harry Hartung
- Uli Ritzer
- Barnabas von Géczy
- Harald Reinl

== Bibliography ==
- Bock, Hans-Michael & Bergfelder, Tim. The Concise CineGraph. Encyclopedia of German Cinema. Berghahn Books, 2009.
- Klaus, Ulrich J. Deutsche Tonfilme: Jahrgang 1931. Klaus-Archiv, 1988.
