= Ewiger Wald =

- Directed by: Hanns Springer; Rolf von Sonjevski-Jamrowski
- Written by: Albert Graf von Pestalozza (writer); Carl Maria Holzapfel (poems)
- Produced by: Albert Graf von Pestalozza (producer)
- Starring: See below
- Cinematography: Sepp Allgeier; Werner Bohne; Otto Ewald; Wolf Hart; Guido Seeber; A.O. Weitzenberg; Bernhard Wentzel
- Edited by: Arnfried Heyne
- Music by: Wolfgang Zeller
- Production company: Culture Group
- Release date: 8 June 1936
- Running time: 75 minutes 88 minutes (Germany)
- Country: Germany
- Language: German

Ewiger Wald is a 1936 German film directed by Hanns Springer and Rolf von Sonjevski-Jamrowski. The film's international English title was Enchanted Forest.

Commissioned by Alfred Rosenberg's cultural organization Militant League for German Culture in 1934 under the working title Deutscher Wald–Deutsches Schicksal (German Forest – German Destiny), the feature-length movie premiered in Munich in 1936. Intended as cinematic proof for the shared destiny of the German woods and the German people beyond the vicissitudes of history, it portrayed a perfect symbiosis of an eternal forest and a likewise eternal people firmly rooted in it between Neolithic and National Socialist times.

== Plot ==
In accordance with Rosenberg's anti-Christian beliefs, the first section on prehistory displays various customs and rituals of an asserted pagan forest religion like a maypole dance or funerals in treetrunk coffins. Further, it depicts the forest sheltering ancient Germanic tribes, Arminius, and the Teutonic Knights, facing the German Peasants' War, being chopped up by war and industry, and being humiliated by black soldiers brought into Germany by the French occupation army. The years of the Weimar Republic appear to be disastrous for people and forest alike. The film culminates in a National Socialist May Day celebration filmed at the Berlin Lustgarten.

== Cast ==
- Günther Hadank (voice)
- Heinz Herkommer (voice)
- Paul Klinger (voice)
- Lothar Körner (voice)
- Aribert Mog
- Kurt Wieschala (voice)

== Production ==
Ewiger Wald was produced by the Culture Group and co-directed by Hanns Springer and Rolf von Sonjevski-Jamrowski.

== Release ==
The film premiered at the UFA Palace in Munich on 8 June 1936. It was re-edited to reduce its length and this version was accepted by the censors on 20 August, and premiered in Oldenburg on 28 August.

== Works cited ==
- Welch, David (1983). Propaganda and the German Cinema: 1933-1945. I.B. Tauris. ISBN 9781860645204.
