= Demon of the Himalayas =

1935 film

- Directed by: Andrew Marton
- Written by: Eberhard Frowein; Fritz Rau; Mila Rau
- Produced by: Günter Oskar Dyhrenfurth
- Starring: Gustav Diessl; Erika Dannhoff; Günter Oskar Dyhrenfurth; Jarmila Marton
- Cinematography: Richard Angst
- Music by: Arthur Honegger
- Production company: Tramontana
- Distributed by: Tobis Film
- Release date: 16 March 1935
- Countries: Germany; Switzerland
- Language: German

Demon of the Himalayas (German: Der Dämon des Himalaya) is a 1935 German-Swiss co-production adventure film directed by Andrew Marton and starring Gustav Diessl, Erika Dannhoff, and Günter Oskar Dyhrenfurth. It is part of the mountain film genre which was popular during the era.

Interior filming took place at the Grunewald Studios in Berlin with sets designed by the art directors Fritz Maurischat and Karl Weber. Location shooting was done during the 1934 International Himalayan Expedition and a number of the expedition's participants appeared in the film. The film premiered in Zürich in March 1935. It received a mixed reception from critics. It was remade in Hollywood by Marton in 1952 as Storm Over Tibet.

== Cast ==
- Gustav Diessl as Doctor Norman, Ethnologist
- Erika Dannhoff as Anne
- Günter Oskar Dyhrenfurth as Professor Wille
- Jarmila Marton as Ellen
- Hans Winzeler as Doctor Winkler
- Hans Ertl as Hans
- Albert Höcht as Bertl
- André Roch as André
- James Belaieff as Jimmy
- Piero Ghiglione as Der italienische Bergsteiger und Journalist
- Dalib as Tibetanischer Träger
- Achmad as Tibetanischer Träger

== Bibliography ==
- Holt, Lee Wallace (May 2008). Mountains, Mountaineering and Modernity: A Cultural History of German and Austrian Mountaineering, 1900–1945 (PDF) (PhD). Austin: University of Texas. hdl:2152/3901.
- Pitts, Michael R. (2010). Columbia Pictures Horror, Science Fiction and Fantasy Films, 1928–1982. Jefferson, NC: McFarland. ISBN 978-0-7864-4447-2.
