= Max Holsboer =

Swiss ice hockey player

- Born: 29 July 1883; Chur, Switzerland
- Died: 12 January 1958 (aged 74); Zürich, Switzerland
- National team: Switzerland
- Playing career: 1910–1932

Wilhelm Max Gerhard Holsboer (sometimes Holzboer; 29 July 1883 – 12 January 1958) was a Swiss ice hockey player who competed in the 1920 Summer Olympics. He later appeared in several films. In 1920, he participated with the Swiss ice hockey team in the Summer Olympics tournament.

== Life ==
Holsboer was born 29 July 1883 in Chur, Switzerland, the youngest of seven children, to Willem Jan Holsboer, a Dutch-born Swiss citizen who was primarily known for founding Rhaetian Railways and turning Davos into a tourism destination, and Ursula Holsboer (née Busch), a native of Davos.

== Personal life ==
He was married to Anna Seibold, they did not have any children.

== Selected filmography ==
- The Call of the North (1929)

== See also ==
List of Olympic men's ice hockey players for Switzerland
