= Ernő Szenes =

Hungarian actor (1889–1945)

Ernõ Szenes
- Born: Ernő Schwarcz; 24 December 1889; Miskolc, Austria-Hungary
- Died: 25 February 1945 (aged 55); Buchenwald concentration camp, Nazi Germany
- Occupation: Actor
- Years active: 1915–1939

Ernő Szenes (born Ernő Schwarcz; 24 December 1889 – 25 February 1945) was a Hungarian actor. He was active in both theatre and film from 1915 to 1939. He died in the Buchenwald concentration camp in February 1945, just three months before the end of the Second World War.

== Selected filmography ==
- Lotti ezredesi (1916)
- Ki a győztes? (1919)
- A kormánybiztos (1919)
- A csodagyerek (1920)
- A napkelet asszonya (1927)
- Autobus Nr. 2 (1929)
- Der Ruf des Nordens (1929)
- Die singende Stadt (1930)
- Es gibt eine Frau, die dich niemals vergißt (1930)
- Liebe und Champagner (1930)
- Grock (1931)
- Hyppolit, a lakáj (1931)
- The Rakoczi March (1933)
- Mindent a nöért! (1934)
- Rotschild leánya (1934)
- 3:1 a szerelem javára (1937)
- A Girl Sets Out (1937)
- Black Diamonds (1938)
- The Henpecked Husband (1938)
