= Charlotte Kerr =

German actress, filmmaker

- Born: 29 May 1927; Frankfurt am Main, Hesse, Germany
- Died: 28 December 2011 (aged 84); Bern, Switzerland
- Occupations: film director, film producer, actress, writer, and journalist
- Spouses: Harry R. Sokal (before 1979) Friedrich Dürrenmatt (m. 1984; died 1990)

Charlotte Kerr (29 May 1927 – 28 December 2011) was a German director, film producer, actress, writer and journalist.

She first performed on stage in Fritz Kortner’s version of Schiller's Don Carlos in 1951. She became well known for her television role as commander of the spaceship Hydra in the Raumpatrouille series and for her appearances in the films of Rainer Erler, including Fleisch (1979).

In 1971, she was a member of the jury at the 21st Berlin International Film Festival.

In 1983, during the filming of a film about the Greek minister Melina Mercouri, Kerr met the Swiss poet Friedrich Dürrenmatt. They became close after discussing his latest play Achterloo and were married in 1984. The two collaborated on the film Portrait eines Planeten and the play Rollenspiele. Dürrenmatt died in 1990. Her autobiography, Die Frau im roten Mantel, discussed her life with the writer. In 2000, her Centre Dürrenmatt was opened in Neuchâtel.

She took legal action against the writer Hugo Loetscher for an alleged affront of her dignity and personal rights in his book about Dürrenmatt's death and funeral, which was released 13 years after Dürrenmatt's death and published by Lesen statt Klettern.

She died on 28 December 2011 in a hospital in Bern.

== Filmography ==
- Carnival in White (1952) - Peggy Swenson
- Dein Mund verspricht mir Liebe (1954)
- Heldinnen (1960, screenplay)
- The Miracle of Father Malachia (1961) - Dr. Renate Kellinghus
- Raumpatrouille (1966, TV series) - General Lydia van Dyke
- The New Life Style (1968) - Frau Bergmann
- Peter und Sabine (1968) - Frauenärztin
- Mattanza – ein Liebestraum (1969) - Geraldine
- Your Caresses (1969) - Mother
- Alexander Zwo (1972–1973, TV miniseries) - Maud
- Temptation in the Summer Wind (1972)
- Only the Wind Knows the Answer (1974) - Hilde Hellmann
- Abelard (1977) - Prosecutor
- Plutonium (1978, TV film) - Anna Ferroli
- Fleisch (1979, TV film) - Dr. Jackson
- Swann in Love (1984) - Sous-maitresse
- Raumpatrouille Orion – Rücksturz ins Kino (2003) - General Lydia van Dyke (archive footage)
