= Gerhard Mantel =

German cellist

Gerhard Friedrich Mantel (31 December 1930 – 13 June 2012) was a German cellist, University lecturer and writer instrumental-pedagogical and music-psychological publications.

== Life ==
Born in Karlsruhe, Mantel was the second child of Georg Mantel, professor of piano and composition at the Hochschule für Musik Karlsruhe, and his wife Margarethe. At the age of nine he turned to playing the cello. Already as a pupil he studied in Heidelberg with August Eichhorn. Cello. After Abitur, a Fulbright Program took him to Athens, Ohio. He then refined his skills in Paris with Pierre Fournier, Paul Tortelier and André Navarra, as well as with Pablo Casals in Prades and in Saarbrücken with Maurice Gendron.

After a guest appearance in Norway in the winter of 1952/53 with the Musikselskabet Harmonien, later the Bergen Philharmonic Orchestra, he received an engagement there as solo cellist and worked there until June 1954, after which he remained associated with the orchestra for many years. From 1956 to 1958 he held the same position with the WDR Rundfunkorchester Köln of the WDR in Cologne. Afterwards he gave concerts as a freelancer until 1973, mostly in duo with the pianist Erika Frieser. As soloist and chamber musician he has performed in numerous countries in Europe, North and South America, Japan, Korea and the Near East. His interpretations are documented on numerous records and over 100 radio recordings.

In 1973 he was offered a professorship at the Frankfurt University of Music and Performing Arts. There he was head of the cello class, dean of artistic education and temporary prorector. He also gave master classes in various countries. He passed on his knowledge and experience in textbook form. In 1998 he published 25 self-composed pieces for two cellos, which he called "Duettüden".

In 1994, together with the pianist Sibylle Cada, Mantel founded the "Research Institute for Instrumental and Vocal Pedagogy" in his place of work in Frankfurt and acted as its director from then on. From 1993 to 2000 he was president of the German section of the ESTA (European String Teachers' Association). Together with other members of the "Verein Frankfurter Bachkonzerte e.V." he founded the "Frankfurter Publikumorchester" in 1986 and was its conductor and artistic director for about ten years. The orchestra had successful performances among others in Frankfurt, Leipzig (Gewandhaus) and Lyon.

Mantel died in Frankfurt at age 81.

== Publications ==
- Cellotechnik. Bewegungsprinzipien und Bewegungsformen. Revised new edition. Schott, Mainz u. a. 2011, ISBN 978-3-7957-8749-3.
- Cello üben. Eine Methodik des Übens nicht nur für Streicher. Von der Analyse zur Intuition. expanded edition. Schott, Mainz u. a. 1999, ISBN 3-7957-8714-9.
- Cello mit Spaß und Hugo. Ein neuer Weg zum Cellospiel. (together with Renate Mantel). 3 volumes. Schott, Mainz among others. 1996, ISBN 978-3-7957-5173-9, -5174-6, -5175-3.
- Duettüden. 24 Stücke zur Einführung in das Lagenspiel. For 2 Violoncelli = Duetudes (Partitur). Schott, Mainz among others 1998.
- Einfach üben. 185 unübliche Überezepte für Instrumentalisten. Mainz u. a. 2001, ISBN 3-7957-8724-6.
- Mut zum Lampenfieber. Mentale Strategien für Musiker zur Bewältigung von Auftritts- und Prüfungsangst. Atlantis-Musikbuch-Verlag, Zürich/ Mainz 2003, ISBN 3-254-08385-7.
- Intonation. Spielräume für Streicher. Schott, Mainz u. a. 2005, ISBN 3-7957-8729-7.
- Interpretation. Vom Text zum Klang. Schott, Mainz u. a. 2007, ISBN 978-3-7957-8731-8.
- Etüden üben. 3 volumes with commentary supplement. Schott, Mainz u. a. 2011, Literature by and about Gerhard Mantel in the German National Library catalogue.

== Awards ==
- Culture Prize of the City of Karlsruhe, 1955
- Verdienstorden der Bundesrepublik Deutschland am Bande, 1999
- Honorary President of the German Section of the ESTA (European String Teachers' Association), 2000
