= Aribert Mog =

German actor (1904–1941)

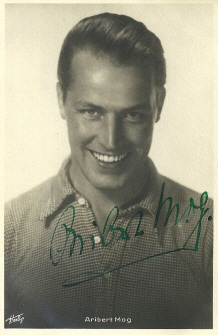
- Born: 3 August 1904; Berlin, German Empire
- Died: 2 October 1941 (aged 37); Nova Trojanova, Soviet Union
- Cause of death: Killed in action
- Other name: Aribert Moog
- Occupation: Film actor
- Years active: 1929–1940

Aribert Mog (3 August 1904 – 2 October 1941) was a German film actor who played in a mixture of leading and supporting roles during the 1930s. He was a member of the Militant League for German Culture and the National Socialist Factory Cell Organization. In May 1940 he was called up for military service and died fighting on the Eastern Front with the Infantry Regiment 9 Potsdam the following year.

== Selected filmography ==
- Fight of the Tertia (1929)
- The Brandenburg Arch (1929)
- The Call of the North (1929)
- Scapa Flow (1930)
- Farewell (1930)
- Westfront 1918 (1930)
- Kinder vor Gericht (1931)
- The Trunks of Mr. O.F. (1931)
- The Song of Life (1931)
- Louise, Queen of Prussia (1931)
- The Leap into the Void (1932)
- Girls of Today (1933)
- Ekstase (1933)
- Must We Get Divorced? (1933)
- Regine (1935)
- Dreams of Love (1935)
- Fährmann Maria (1936)
- The Unknown (1936)
- Ewiger Wald (1936)
- Der Etappenhase (1937)
- Carousel (1937)
- Travelling People (1938)
- The Curtain Falls (1939)
- The Fox of Glenarvon (1940)
- Wunschkonzert (1940)

== Bibliography ==
- Bock, Hans-Michael; Bergfelder, Tim, eds. (2009). The Concise Cinegraph: Encyclopaedia of German Cinema. New York: Berghahn Books. ISBN 978-1-57181-655-9.
- Klee, Ernst (2007). Das Kulturlexikon zum Dritten Reich. Wer war was vor und nach 1945 (in German). Frankfurt: S. Fischer. p. 414. ISBN 978-3-10-039326-5.
