= Hyppolit, the Butler =

1931 Hungarian comedy film

- Original title: Hyppolit, a lakáj
- Directed by: István Székely
- Screenplay by: Károly Nóti
- Based on: Hyppolit, a lakáj (play) by István Zágon
- Produced by: Béla Keleti; Albert Samek
- Starring: Gyula Csortos; Gyula Kabos; Pál Jávor
- Cinematography: István Eiben; Eduard Hösch
- Edited by: László Benedek
- Music by: Mihály Eisemann
- Production company: Sonor Film
- Distributed by: Kovács Emil és Társa
- Release date: 1931
- Running time: 77 minutes
- Country: Hungary
- Language: Hungarian

Hyppolit, the Butler (Hungarian: Hyppolit, a lakáj) is a 1931 black-and-white Hungarian film comedy of manners about an upwardly mobile family hiring a butler who previously worked for aristocratic families. It was the second full sound film produced in Hungary, and at first it generated little interest (due to the flop of the first sound movie The Blue Idol, also in 1931) but later became a favorite and is still a beloved oldie. The film was chosen to be part of the New Budapest Twelve, a list of Hungarian films considered the best in 2000. The film was shot at the Hunnia Film Studios in Budapest.

The screenplay was written by prolific Hungarian screenwriter Károly Nóti AKA Karl Noti, based on a stage play by István Zágon. It was directed by Székely István AKA Steve Sekely, who earlier worked in Germany and later worked in Hollywood and Great Britain. The music was composed by Mihály Eisemann.

It was remade in 1999 as Hippolyt, a lakáj (with the y and the i interchanged).

== Plot ==
Mátyás Schneider (Gyula Kabos) is a typical parvenu, an ignorant transportation entrepreneur who has become very rich quickly. Despite their humble origins, his wife (Mici Haraszti) strives to live a 'sophisticated' and 'aristocratic' lifestyle. When she engages a butler, Hyppolit (Gyula Csortos) - who was an educated man, and who has served in the household of a late count for 27 years and traveled around the world with the late Count - their whole life is turned upside down: Schneider has to shave off his mustache, wear a dinner suit for dinner and eat French food instead of his beloved onions and roasted goose, while his wife is bullied by the butler into engaging in gymnastics and a rather meagre diet.

In the meantime, the Schneiders' spirited daughter, Terka (Éva Fenyvessy), falls for their good-looking manager, the former driver István Benedek (Pál Jávor), who keeps secret that he is in fact an engineer with a college diploma. Her mother, however, would prefer the good-natured, but quite stupid Makáts (Gyula Gózon) as a suitor, because Makáts's uncle (Sándor Góth), a city councillor, may help them to get a lucrative contract.

Things begin to turn upside down, when Schneider follows Hyppolit's suggestions to start dating Mimi (Mici Erdélyi), a singer and dancer at a sleazy night club. When he fails to show up at a date with her, the girl enters the Schneiders' villa, where a dinner party with important guests - including Makáts's uncle - is taking place, and causes a scandal. Meanwhile, Terka follows her own plans to get the man she wants...

== Cast ==
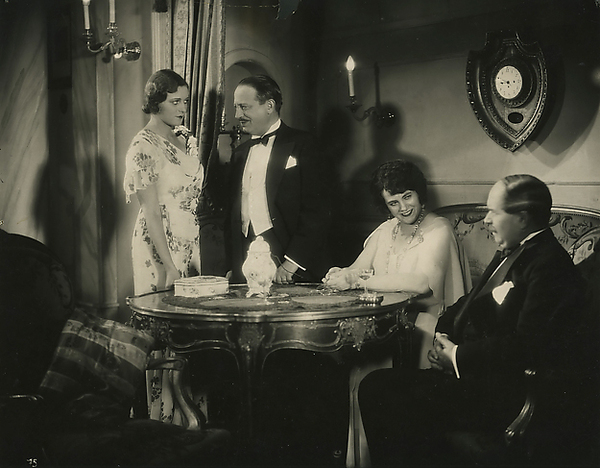
Éva Fenyvessy, Gyula Gózon, Mici Haraszti and Gyula Kabos in Hyppolit, the Butler

- Gyula Csortos as Hyppolit
- Gyula Kabos as Mátyás Schneider
- Mici Haraszti as Schneider's Wife
- Éva Fenyvessy as Terka, Schneider's Daughter
- Gyula Gózon as Makáts, Terka's suitor
- Mici Erdélyi as Mimi, a Night Club Dancer
- Pál Jávor as István Benedek
- Sándor Góth as City Councillor
- Ernõ Szenes as Tóbiás
- Marcsa Simon as Julcsa
- Jenő Herczeg
- István Bársony
- Lajos Gárdonyi
- Ferenc Pázmán
- Andor Sárossy
- Elvira Horváth as Physical Instructor
- Zoltán Makláry
- László Rehberger as Cook
- Gusztáv Vándory

== Subsequent history ==
The film was shown again in Hungarian cinemas in 1945, 1956 and 1972. It is also shown regularly on the small screen and is still popular with viewers.

Almost eighty years after its premiere, in 2008, the original film was digitally restored by the Hungarian National Film Archive. The restored version erroneously awarded director Sekely a writing credit that does not appear in either the original film titles or in any subsequent documentation. It has been released on DVD and Blu-ray.
