= North Pole, Ahoy =

1934 film

- Directed by: Andrew Marton
- Written by: Arnold Fanck; Charlie Roellinghoff
- Produced by: Carl Laemmle
- Starring: Walter Riml; Guzzi Lantschner; Gibson Gowland
- Cinematography: Richard Angst
- Music by: Paul Dessau
- Production company: Deutsche Universal-Film
- Distributed by: Deutsche Universal-Film
- Release date: 6 January 1934
- Running time: 82 minutes
- Country: Germany
- Language: German

North Pole, Ahoy (German: Nordpol – Ahoi!) is a 1934 German comedy film directed by Andrew Marton and starring Walter Riml, Guzzi Lantschner and Gibson Gowland.

== Synopsis ==
A film company goes to shoot its latest production in the Arctic.

== Cast ==
- Walter Riml as Fietje
- Guzzi Lantschner as Tietje
- Jarmila Marton as Rita Nora
- Gibson Gowland as Leading seaman
- Karl Buchholz as Film Director
- Ludwig Stössel as Director
- Hans Hermann Schaufuß as Professor Pierson
- Senta Söneland as Mrs. Pierson
- Walter Gross
- Nora Nord
- Charly Berger
- Louis Adlon

== Production ==
North Pole, Ahoy was the last feature film by the German subsidiary of Universal Pictures before it withdrew from Germany to Austria following the takeover by the Nazi Party. It was shot in Greenland and Switzerland. One of the actors, Gustav Lantschner, later worked as a cameraman on Olympia.

== Works cited ==
- Waldman, Harry (2008). Nazi Films In America, 1933-1942. McFarland & Company. ISBN 9780786438617.
