= Scapa Flow (film) =

1930 film

- Directed by: Leo Lasko
- Written by: Leo de Laforgue; Leo Lasko
- Starring: Otto Gebühr; Claire Rommer; Claus Clausen; Carl Balhaus
- Cinematography: Edgar S. Ziesemer
- Production company: Olympia Film
- Distributed by: Olympia Film
- Release date: February 1930
- Country: Germany
- Language: German

Scapa Flow is a 1930 German drama film directed by Leo Lasko and starring Otto Gebühr, Claire Rommer and Claus Clausen. It is set around the Wilhelmshaven Mutiny and the Scuttling of the German fleet at Scapa Flow at the close of the First World War. In Weimar Germany the scuttling of the fleet in defiance of the victorious Allies had come to be seen as a popular patriotic act. The inclusion of the mutiny, however, was more controversial as it highlighted the political divisions which continued to exist. The film was praised by the right wing press, and comparisons were made to the Russian film Battleship Potemkin. The film was partly inspired by the 1918 play Seeschalt by Reinhardt Goering.

== Cast ==
- Otto Gebühr
- Claus Clausen
- Claire Rommer
- Erna Morena
- Aribert Mog
- Arthur Duarte
- Carl Balhaus
- Heinz Klockow

== Bibliography ==
- Kester, Bernadette. Film Front Weimar: Representations of the First World War in German films of the Weimar Period (1919-1933). Amsterdam University Press, 2003.
