= The Fire Devil =

- Directed by: Luis Trenker
- Written by: Hanns Sassmann; Luis Trenker
- Produced by: Willy Reiber; Luis Trenker
- Starring: Luis Trenker; Judith Holzmeister, Bertl Schultes; Hilde von Stolz
- Cinematography: Albert Benitz; Albert Höcht; Klaus von Rautenfeld
- Edited by: Werner Jacobs; Gottlieb Madl
- Music by: Giuseppe Becce
- Production companies: Bavaria Film; Luis Trenker-Film
- Distributed by: Bavaria Film
- Release date: 5 March 1940
- Running time: 100 minutes
- Country: Germany
- Language: German

The Fire Devil (German: Der Feuerteufel) is a 1940 German historical adventure film directed by and starring Luis Trenker. It also featured Judith Holzmeister, Bertl Schultes and Hilde von Stolz. The title is sometimes translated as The Arsonist.

The film's sets were designed by the art directors Erich Grave and Ludwig Reiber. It was shot at the Bavaria Studios in Munich. Location shooting took place in Mittenwald, Schwäbisch Hall and North Tyrol. It premiered at the Ufa-Palast am Zoo in Berlin. Costing over a million reichsmarks to make, it easily recouped its production costs at the box office and was a considerable popular success.

It is set during the Tyrolean Rebellion against Napoleon, about which Trenker had previously made another film The Rebel in 1932. However Adolf Hitler, who had been an admirer of the previous film, was apparently displeased feeling that the parallels between Napoleon and the Third Reich meant that the film glorified and potentially incited popular revolt against the regime. To restore himself to favour, Trenker published his novel Captain Ladurner which was overtly pro-Nazi.

== Cast ==
- Luis Trenker as Valentin Sturmegger
- Judith Holzmeister as Maria Schmiederer
- Bertl Schultes as Clemens Schmiederer
- Hilde von Stolz as Marquise Antoinette de Chanel
- Fritz Kampers as Kaptän Münzer
- Franz Herterich as Kaiser Franz I. von Österreich
- Ernst Fritz Fürbringer as Fürst von Metternich
- Erich Ponto as Kaiser Napoleon Bonaparte
- Claus Clausen as Major Ferdinand von Schill
- Karl-Heinz Peters as Französischer Kommissar
- Walter Ladengast as Rafael Kröss, Verräter
- Ludwig Kerscher as Kluiber, Kärntner Bauer
- Vera Hartegg as Magd
- Ludwig Schmid-Wildy as Klotz, Kärntner Bauer
- Friedrich Ulmer as Reintaler, Kärntner Bauer
- Elise Aulinger as Schönleitnerin
- Sepp Nigg as Zoppel, Bauer
- Lore Schuetzendorf as Frau Schoenleitner
- Kurt Meisel as Erzherzog Johann
- Ferdinand Exl as Purtscheller, Kärntner Bauer
- Paul Mederow as Rusca, französischer General
- Reinhold Pasch as Henri Daru, französischer Oberst
- Karl Fochler as Burron, französischer Offizier
- Klaus Pohl as Kranewitter, Kärntner Bauer
- Carl Balhaus as Kärntner Bauernbursche
- Anton Färber as Kärntner Bauernbursche
- Julius Eckhoff as Französischer Soldat
- Karl Gelfius as Sänger
- Luis Gerold as Holznagel, Bauer
- Leopold Kerscher as Junger Bauernbursche
- Robert Thiem as Offizier
- Aruth Wartan as Knecht mit der Augenklappe

== Bibliography ==
- George L. Mosse. Fallen Soldiers: Reshaping the Memory of the World Wars. Oxford University Press, 1991.
