= Mountains on Fire =

1931 film

- Directed by: Karl Hartl; Luis Trenker
- Written by: Luis Trenker (novel); Karl Hartl
- Produced by: Charles Delac; Marcel Vandal
- Starring: Luis Trenker; Lissy Arna; Luigi Serventi; Claus Clausen
- Cinematography: Sepp Allgeier; Albert Benitz; Giovanni Vitrotti
- Edited by: Karl Hartl; Marc Sorkin; Ernst Fellner
- Music by: Giuseppe Becce
- Production company: Les Films Marcel Vandal et Charles Delac
- Distributed by: Metropol-Filmverleih; Globus-Film
- Release date: 28 September 1931
- Running time: 109 minutes
- Country: Germany
- Language: German

Mountains on Fire (German: Berge in Flammen) is a 1931 German war film directed by Karl Hartl and Luis Trenker and starring Trenker, Lissy Arna and Luigi Serventi. The film was developed from Luis Trenker's novel of the same title, partly based on his own experiences. Separate French and English-language productions were also made.

== Synopsis ==
Shortly before the First World War, an Italian and an Austrian take part in a mountaineering expedition together. Not long afterwards they find themselves fighting on different sides. The plot also features references to the mines on the Italian front.

== Cast ==
- Luis Trenker as Florian Dimai
- Lissy Arna as Pia, his wife
- Luigi Serventi as Count Artur Franchini, his friend
- Claus Clausen as Leutnant (lieutenant) Kall
- Erika Dannhoff
- Paul Graetz as Field phone operator
- Michael von Newlinsky
- Emmerich Albert as Tyrolean Mountain Guide Company soldier
- Luis Gerold as Tyrolean Mountain Guide Company soldier
- Hans Jamnig as Tyrolean Mountain Guide Company soldier
- Hugo Lehner as Tyrolean Mountain Guide Company soldier
- Roland von Rossi as Tyrolean Mountain Guide Company soldier

== See also ==
- Doomed Battalion (1932)

== Bibliography ==
- Trenker, Luis (1931). Berge in Flammen. Ein Roman aus den Schicksalstagen Südtirols. Berlin: Neufeld & Henius. OCLC 1069062357.
- Trenker, Luis; Degon, Pierre A. (1934). La guerre au Tyrol: combats dans les Dolomites (1915–1918). Paris: Payot. OCLC 48707673.
- Heer, Hannes; Naumann, Klaus, eds. (2004). War of Extermination: The German Military in World War II, 1941–1944. Berghahn Books. ISBN 978-1-57181-493-7.
- Keller, Tait (April 2009). "The Mountains Roar: The Alps during the Great War". Environmental History. 14 (2): 253–274. doi:10.1093/envhis/14.2.253. JSTOR 40608470.
