= Carnival in White =

1952 film

- Directed by: Hans Albin; Harry R. Sokal
- Written by: Hans Albin; Peter Francke; Harry R. Sokal
- Produced by: Hans Albin; Harry R. Sokal
- Starring: Adrian Hoven; Hannelore Bollmann; Lucie Englisch
- Cinematography: Friedl Behn-Grund; Kurt Neubert; Walter Riml
- Edited by: Walter Fredersdorf
- Production company: Sokal-Film
- Distributed by: Deutsche Cosmopol Film
- Release date: 30 October 1952
- Running time: 85 minutes
- Country: West Germany
- Language: German

Carnival in White (German: Karneval in Weiß) is a 1952 West German comedy film directed by Hans Albin and Harry R. Sokal, starring Adrian Hoven, Hannelore Bollmann and Lucie Englisch. It was made at the Bavaria Studios in Munich and on location at the Swiss resort town St. Moritz. The film's sets were designed by Ernst H. Albrecht.

== Synopsis ==
A young engineer has plans to construct a new ski jump that will help boost tourism in the Alpine ski resort. He manages to secure the financial backing of a former local resident who emigrated to the United States many years ago and is now a rich man. However the engineer's involvement with his daughter Peggy provokes the jealousy of his fiancée Annelies.

== Cast ==
- Adrian Hoven as Hans Brugger
- Hannelore Bollmann as Annelies Seethaler
- Lucie Englisch as Ludmilla Möller
- Charlotte Kerr as Peggy Swenson
- Walter Riml as Hein Möller
- Peter W. Staub as Fietje Schwedler
- Franz Muxeneder as Toni
- Alfred Pongratz as Holzbichler
- Beppo Brem as Wastl
- Bum Krüger as Dr. Schlauch
- Ernst Schönle as Grauhuber

== Bibliography ==
- Hans-Michael Bock and Tim Bergfelder. The Concise Cinegraph: An Encyclopedia of German Cinema. Berghahn Books, 2009.
