= Two Bavarians in the Jungle =

1957 film

- Directed by: Ludwig Bender
- Written by: Jochen Genzow; Hans Fitz
- Produced by: Jochen Genzow
- Starring: Joe Stöckel; Beppo Brem; Lucie Englisch
- Cinematography: Klaus von Rautenfeld
- Edited by: Anneliese Schönnenbeck
- Music by: Peter Igelhoff
- Production company: Regina Film
- Distributed by: Prisma Film
- Release date: 7 June 1957
- Running time: 89 minutes
- Country: West Germany
- Language: German

Two Bavarians in the Jungle (German: Zwei Bayern im Urwald) is a 1957 West German comedy film directed by Ludwig Bender and starring Joe Stöckel, Beppo Brem and Lucie Englisch. It is a sequel to the 1956 hit Two Bavarians in St. Pauli.

== Cast ==
- Joe Stöckel as Jonathan Ratzenstaller
- Beppo Brem as Michl Moosrainer
- Lucie Englisch as Emerenzia Ratzenstaller
- Maria Stadler as Kuni Moosrainer
- Hubert von Meyerinck as Jawassis
- Fritz Straßner as Xaver Huber
- Anne-Marie Kolb as Ria Huber
- Bert Fortell as Toni Gschwendner
- Georg Bauer as Gschwendner
- Jean Pierre Faye as Das Narbengesicht
- Franz Fröhlich as Ortspolizist
- Bertl Schultes
- Ruth Stephan as Lilo Knopke

== Bibliography ==
- Beni Eppenberger & Daniel Stapfer. Mädchen, Machos und Moneten: die unglaubliche Geschichte des SchweizerKinounternehmers Erwin C. Dietrich. Verlag Scharfe Stiefel, 2006.
