= Captain Ladurner =

Novel by Luis Trenker

- Author: Luis Trenker
- Language: Germany
- Genre: Adventure
- Publication date: 1940
- Publication place: Germany
- Media type: Print

Captain Ladurner (German: Hauptmann Ladurner) is a 1940 German adventure novel by the South Tyrol mountaineer Luis Trenker. It portrays a group of First World War veterans who conspire to overthrow the Weimar Republic, portrayed as corrupt.

It was released by Trenker following his film The Fire Devil which had apparently displeased Adolf Hitler with his glorification of popular revolts.

== Bibliography ==
- George L. Mosse. Fallen Soldiers: Reshaping the Memory of the World Wars. Oxford University Press, 1991.
