= The Mountain Calls =

1938 film directed by Luis Trenker

- Directed by: Luis Trenker
- Starring: Luis Trenker
- Release date: 6 January 1938
- Running time: 95 minutes
- Language: German

The Mountain Calls (German: Der Berg ruft) is a film directed by Luis Trenker which recreates the struggle between Edward Whymper and Jean-Antoine Carrel for the first successful ascent of the Matterhorn in 1865.

This German film is one of two 1938 Trenker remakes of Struggle for the Matterhorn in which Trenker acted in 1928, the other being the British The Challenge.

== Plot ==
Italian mountaineer Jean-Antoine Carrel wants to be the first man to reach the summit of the Matterhorn. He meets British mountaineer Whymper and they decide to climb together.

An intrigue spoils this agreement and the two men attempt the ascent on the same day with two different teams, Carrel on the Italian side and Whymper on the Swiss side.

Whymper successfully reaches the summit along with his six companions, Hudson, Hadow, Douglas and the guides Croz and Taugwalder father and son. Only Whymper and two of his guides survive the descent.

== Cast ==
- Luis Trenker as Jean Antoine Carrel
- Herbert Dirmoser as Edward Whymper
- Heidemarie Hatheyer as Felicitas
- Peter Elsholtz as Giordano
- Lucie Höflich as Mother Carell
- Blandine Ebinger as Miss Sweaton
- Umberto Sacripante as Luc Meynet
- Reginald Pasch as Hudson
- Robert Thiem as Hadow
- Kunibert Gensichen as Douglas
- Luis Gerold as Guide Croz
- Friedrich Ulmer as Favre
- Bruno Hübner as Stefano
- Armin Schweizer as Seiler
- Lotte Spira as Frau Seiler

== See also ==
- The Challenge (1938)
- First ascent of the Matterhorn
