= Florian Holsboer =

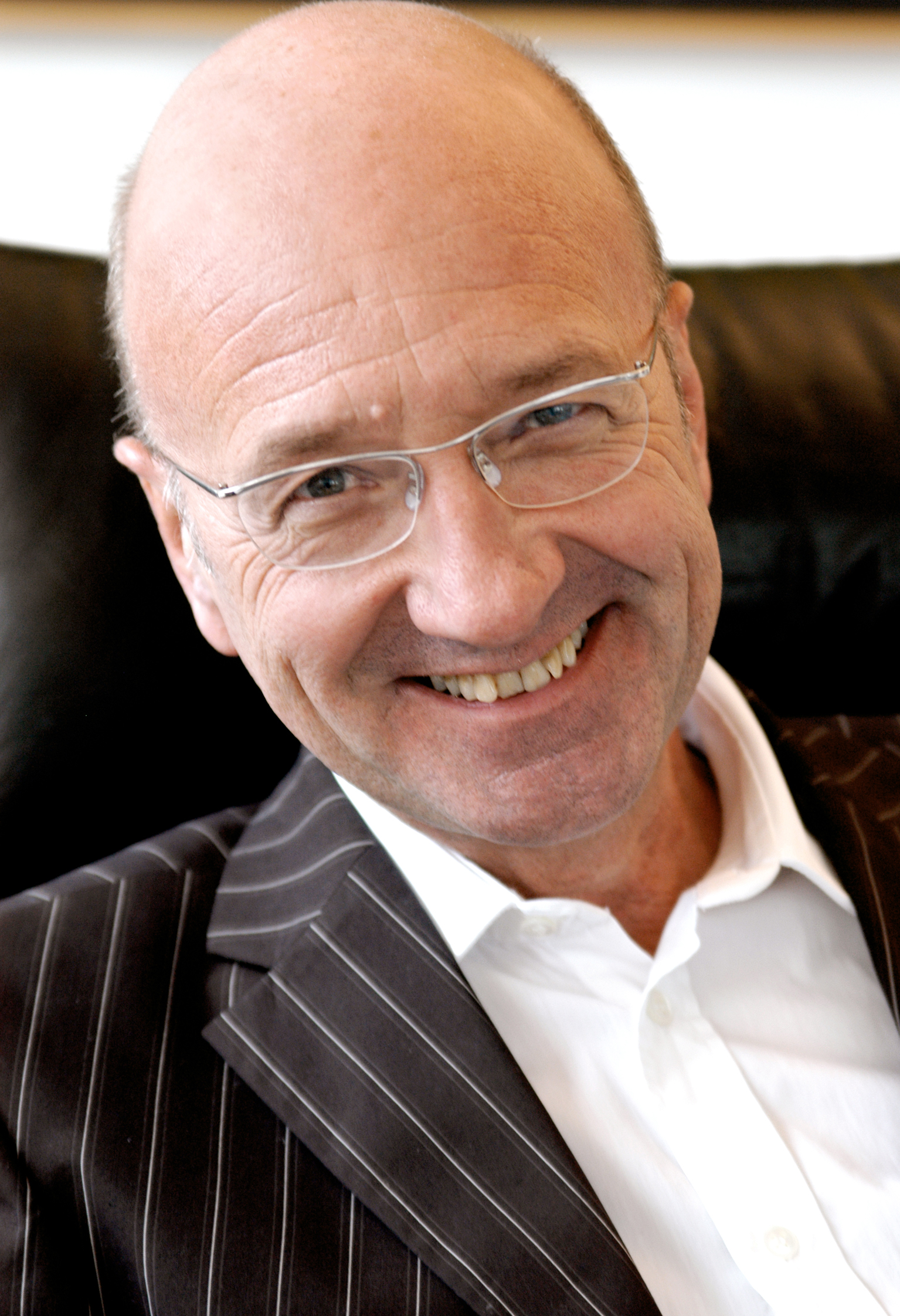
- Holsboer in 2004

President of Max Planck Society
- In office 1989–2014

Personal details
- Born: Johann Florian Holsboer; 27 May 1945 (age 80) Munich, Nazi Germany (now Germany)
- Occupation: Professor, physician, chemist
- Website: Official website

Johann Florian Holsboer (born 27 May 1945) is a German-born Swiss professor, physician and chemist. Most notably he has served as the president of Max Planck Society from 1989 to 2014 in Munich. Between 2014 and 2021, he served as executive of HMNC Brain Health GmbH which he co-founded with Carsten Maschmeyer.

== Life ==
He is a son of Willem Holsboer, an actor, film and theater director, who was born in Stuttgart to Swiss expatriate parents. His great-grandfather was Dutch-born Swiss Willem Jan Holsboer who came to Switzerland in 1867, became a Swiss citizen in 1888, and pioneered the tourism industry of Davos as well as founding Rhaetian Railways.
