= There Is a Woman Who Never Forgets You =

1930 film

- Directed by: Leo Mittler
- Written by: Ladislaus Vajda; Andor Zsoldos
- Produced by: Herman Millakowsky
- Starring: Iván Petrovich; Lil Dagover; Helene Fehdmer
- Cinematography: Mutz Greenbaum
- Music by: Hanson Milde-Meissner
- Production company: Greenbaum-Film
- Distributed by: Bavaria Film
- Release date: 27 March 1930
- Running time: 97 minutes
- Country: Germany
- Language: German

There Is a Woman Who Never Forgets You (German: Es gibt eine Frau, die dich niemals vergißt) is a 1930 German drama film directed by Leo Mittler and starring Iván Petrovich, Lil Dagover and Helene Fehdmer. Its shooting had originally begun as a silent film at the Staaken Studios before switching to sound at the newly converted Tempelhof Studios in Berlin. The film's sets were designed by the art directors Hans Sohnle and Otto Erdmann.

== Cast ==
- Iván Petrovich as Georg Moeller - der Sohn
- Lil Dagover as Tilly Ferrantes
- Helene Fehdmer
- Gaston Jacquet as Der Graf
- Felix Bressart
- Otto Wallburg
- Hans Peppler
- Franz Weber
- Rolf Gert
- Oskar Sima
- Leda Gloria
- Hadrian Maria Netto
- Ellen Frank
- Ernst Legal
- Hermann Speelmans
- Ernst Stahl-Nachbaur
- Hans Halber
- Ernõ Szenes

== Bibliography ==
- Alfonso Canziani. Cinema di tutto il mondo. A. Mondadori, 1978.
