= Willem Jan Holsboer =

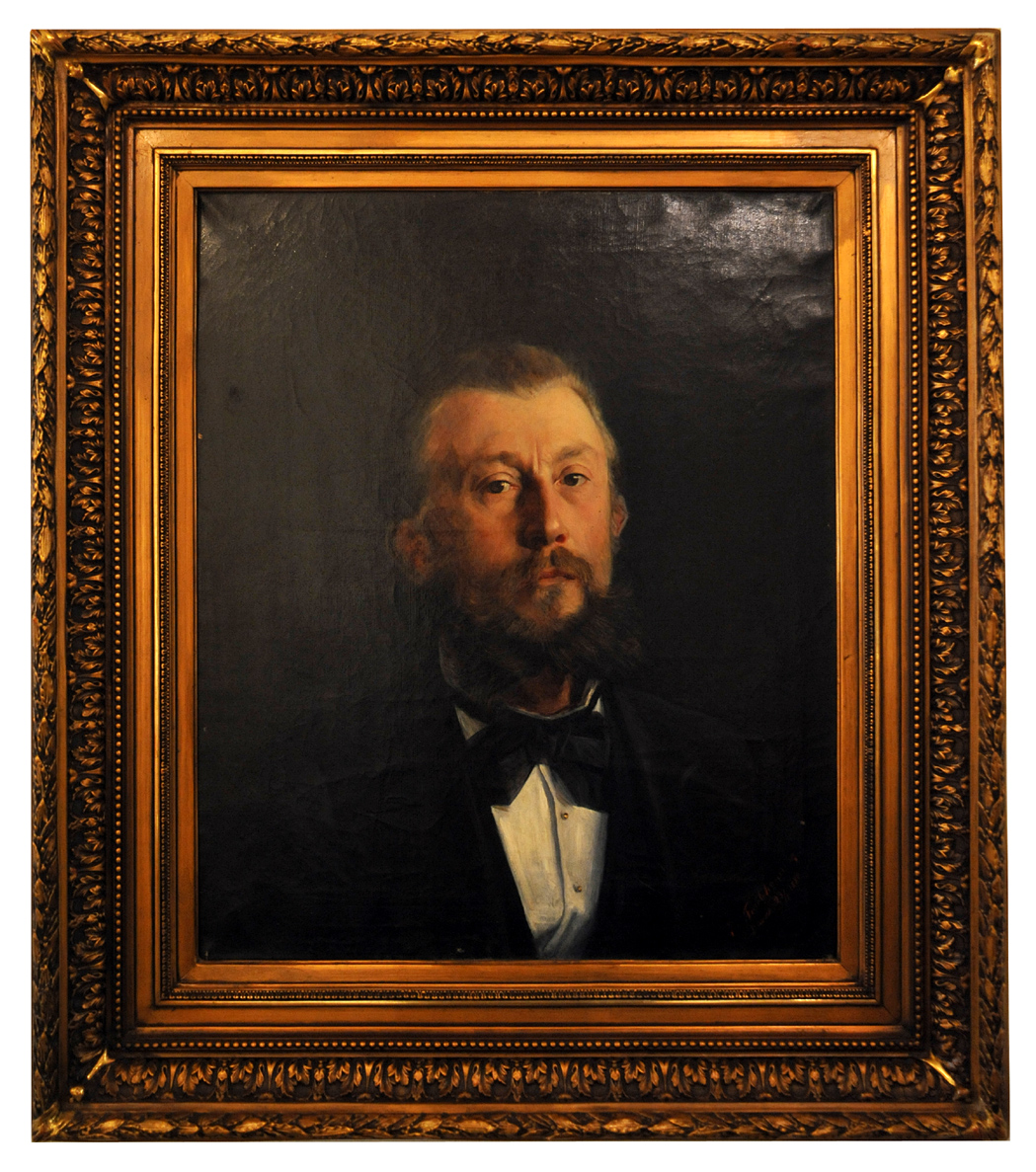
- Holsboer portrayed by Emanuel Forchhammer, 1880s
- Born: 23 August 1834; Zutphen, Netherlands
- Died: 8 June 1898 (aged 63); Schinznach, Switzerland
- Citizenship: Dutch (1834–1888); Swiss (1888–1898)
- Occupation(s): Businessman, hotelier, tourism and railway pioneer
- Known for: Founding Rhaetian Railway
- Spouses: Margreth Elizabeth Navelle Jones (m. 1865; died 1867) Ursula Büsch (m. 1868)
- Children: 7, including Max Holsboer
- Relatives: Willem Holsboer (grandson); Florian Holsboer (great-grandson)

Willem Jan Holsboer (Dutch pronunciation: [ˈʋɪləm jɑn ˈhɔlsbuːr]; 23 August 1834 – 8 June 1898), also referred to as simply Jan Holsboer or as W. J. Holsboer, was a Dutch-born Swiss businessman, hotelier and pioneer of the tourism and railroad industry. Most notably he was the founder of Rhaetian Railway and patron of the tourism destination Davos.

== Early life and education ==
Holsboer was born 23 August 1834 in Zutphen, Gelderland in the Kingdom of the Netherlands, the third of eight children, to Matthijs Arnoldus Holsboer (1806–1872), a cotton manufacturer and mayor of Winterswijk and Dinxperlo, and Maria Lucretia Holsboer (née van Enschut; 1804–1881). His father was originally from Arnhem, his mother from Zutphen. He completed an education to become a helmsman, captain and then like his father a merchant. During his seafaring years, he also traveled to California during the Gold Rush.

== Career ==
In the 1860s, Holsboer became an authorized officer for Twentsche Bank, in Enschede. In 1865, he was designated to become the director of the bank in a newly opened subsidiary in London, United Kingdom. In 1867, due to the lung disease of his wife, they decided to relocate to Davos, Switzerland. His wife died there around 1868. Ultimately, he elected to stay in Davos, and took-over the incomplete "Palace Hotel und Kurhaus Davos" which burned down in 1872. Ultimately he completed three more hotels; Hotel Rhätia, Zur Post and Hotel Schweizerhof. Then he took-over the management of the new Kurhaus Davos (presently better known as Schatzalp).

Most notably, Holsboer served as the first president of Davoser Gesellschaft der Elektrizitätswerke (electrical power supply company), and under his initiative the Bank of Davos as well as the Rhaetian Railway was founded.

== Personal life ==
In 1865, Holsboer married Margreth Elisabeth Navelle Jones (1847–1867), in London. After his wife died from tuberculosis he would remarry to Swiss Ursula Büsch, a native of Davos, in 1868. They had seven children;

- Helene Holsboer (1869–1943), married Lucius Spengler, a son of Alexander Spengler, a doctor for tuberculosis who treated Holsboer's first wife before her death. Helene's daughter, Helene Spengler, would marry Dr. Oscar Miller, industrialist and paper manufacturer from Solothurn. Their son, Oscar L. Miller, would later take-over the Berghotel Schatzalp.
- Willem Alex Holsboer, colloquially W.A. Holsboer (died 1943), married to H. Greve, one son Max Holsboer (1902–1932).
- Wilhelm Max Gerhard Holsboer, colloquially Max, (29 July 1883 – 12 January 1958), a Swiss ice hockey player, married Anna Seibold.

He died after a short illness in Schinznach aged 63. He was buried in Davos. Since 1888, Holsboer was a Swiss citizen, with his place of origin being Chur.

== See also ==
- Swiss Radio and Television (SRF); DOK – Cuntrasts – Die Pioniere der Eisenbahn in Graubünden (in German)
