= The Call of the North (1929 film) =

1929 film by Nunzio Malasomma and Mario Bonnard

- Directed by: Nunzio Malasomma; Mario Bonnard
- Written by: Curt J. Braun; Nunzio Malasomma
- Produced by: Victor Skutezky; Luis Trenker
- Starring: Luis Trenker; Max Holzboer; Eva von Berne
- Cinematography: Franz Eigner; Eduard von Borsody; Willy Winterstein
- Edited by: Jean Oser; Geza Pollatschik
- Production companies: Hom-Film; Patria-Filmkunst-Produktion
- Distributed by: Süd-Film
- Release date: 13 September 1929
- Country: Germany
- Language: German

The Call of the North (German: Der Ruf des Nordens) is a 1929 German adventure film directed by Nunzio Malasomma and Mario Bonnard and starring Luis Trenker, Max Holzboer, and Eva von Berne. Originally produced as a silent film, it was subsequently released with an added soundtrack.

== Plot ==
The only survivor of a polar expedition returns to try to find out what happened to his colleagues. The film is similar to the tradition of mountain films, with large amounts of location footage shot, but with the setting moved to the North Pole.

== Cast ==
- Luis Trenker as Peter Helling
- Max Holzboer as Ivar Svensson
- Eva von Berne as Jane Winton
- Nico Turoff as Ivan
- Aribert Mog as Petersen
- Josef Rovenský as Der Kapitän
- Carl Walther Meyer as Der Stewart
- Paul Rehkopf as Aage
- Ernõ Szenes as Der Koch
- Lars Hanson
- Roland von Rossi
- Hugo Lehner
- Karl Falkenberg
- Arno Kozur
- Alexandra Schmitt
- Bruno Ziener

== Production ==
The film's sets were designed by Heinrich Richter.

== Bibliography ==
- Parish, James Robert; Canham, Kingsley (1976). Film Directors Guide: Western Europe. Metuchen, NJ: Scarecrow Press. ISBN 978-0-8108-0908-6.
