= The Song of Life (1931 film) =

1931 film

- Directed by: Alexis Granowsky
- Written by: Victor Trivas; Walter Mehringm
- Produced by: Mark Asarow; Hans Conradi
- Starring: Aribert Mog; Margot Ferra; Elsa Wagner
- Cinematography: Heinrich Balasch; Victor Trinkler
- Edited by: Jean Oser
- Music by: Hanns Eisler; Franz Waxman
- Production company: Tobis Film
- Distributed by: Tobis Film
- Release date: 24 April 1931
- Running time: 54 minutes
- Country: Germany
- Language: German

The Song of Life (German: Das Lied vom Leben) is a 1931 German drama film directed by Alexis Granowsky and starring Aribert Mog, Margot Ferra and Elsa Wagner. Location shooting took place around Hamburg and at the Cecilienhaus in Berlin. It was produced in an avant garde style during the latter years of the Weimar Republic. The film proved controversial and was initially banned by the Berlin police. It was only permitted to be shown with significant cuts to its already short running time.

== Plot ==
Driven by financial necessity Erika agrees to marry a much older and morally debauched baron. The young bride-to-be becomes so distraught that she contemplates suicide in the River Elbe. She is rescued by a young sailor, with whom she has a baby, which she eventually delivers by Caesarian section.

== Cast ==
- Aribert Mog as Igor
- Margot Ferra as Erika Walter
- Elsa Wagner as Erikas Mutter
- Carl Goetz as Baron von Hammen
- Eduard von Winterstein as Guest at Engagement Party
- Ernst Busch as Sänger
- Leo Monosson as Sänger
- Harald Paulsen as Sänger
- Greta Keller as Sängerin

== Reception ==
This film stirred up a storm upon release for its depiction of a Caesarian birth. Though not much was really shown, it was enough to cause women filmgoers—and not a few men—to faint. The film was banned outright in Germany and ran into some censorship problems in the US; still, by its very controversial nature it proved to be a hit wherever it was shown.

== Bibliography ==
- Grange, William. Cultural Chronicle of the Weimar Republic. Scarecrow Press, 2008.
- Klaus, Ulrich J. Deutsche Tonfilme: Jahrgang 1931. Klaus-Archiv, 2006.
