= Bertl Schultes =

German actor (1881–1964)

- Born: 13 December 1881; Munich, Bavaria, German Empire
- Died: 10 March 1964 (aged 82); Munich, Bavaria, West Germany
- Occupation: Actor
- Years active: 1918-1957 (film)

Bertl Schultes (1881–1964) was a German comedy stage and film actor. He travelled with the director Franz Osten to India for the making of The Light of Asia in 1925, acting as an interpreter and assistant director.

== Selected filmography ==
- The Prodigal Son (1934)
- The Sinful Village (1940)
- The Fire Devil (1940)
- The Violin Maker of Mittenwald (1950)
- The Cloister of Martins (1951)
- Heimat Bells (1952)
- The Immortal Vagabond (1953)
- The Mill in the Black Forest (1953)
- The Hunter's Cross (1954)
- Two Bavarians in the Jungle (1957)

== Bibliography ==
- Rogowski, Christian. The Many Faces of Weimar Cinema: Rediscovering Germany's Filmic Legacy. Camden House, 2010.
