= Erika Dannhoff =

German actress

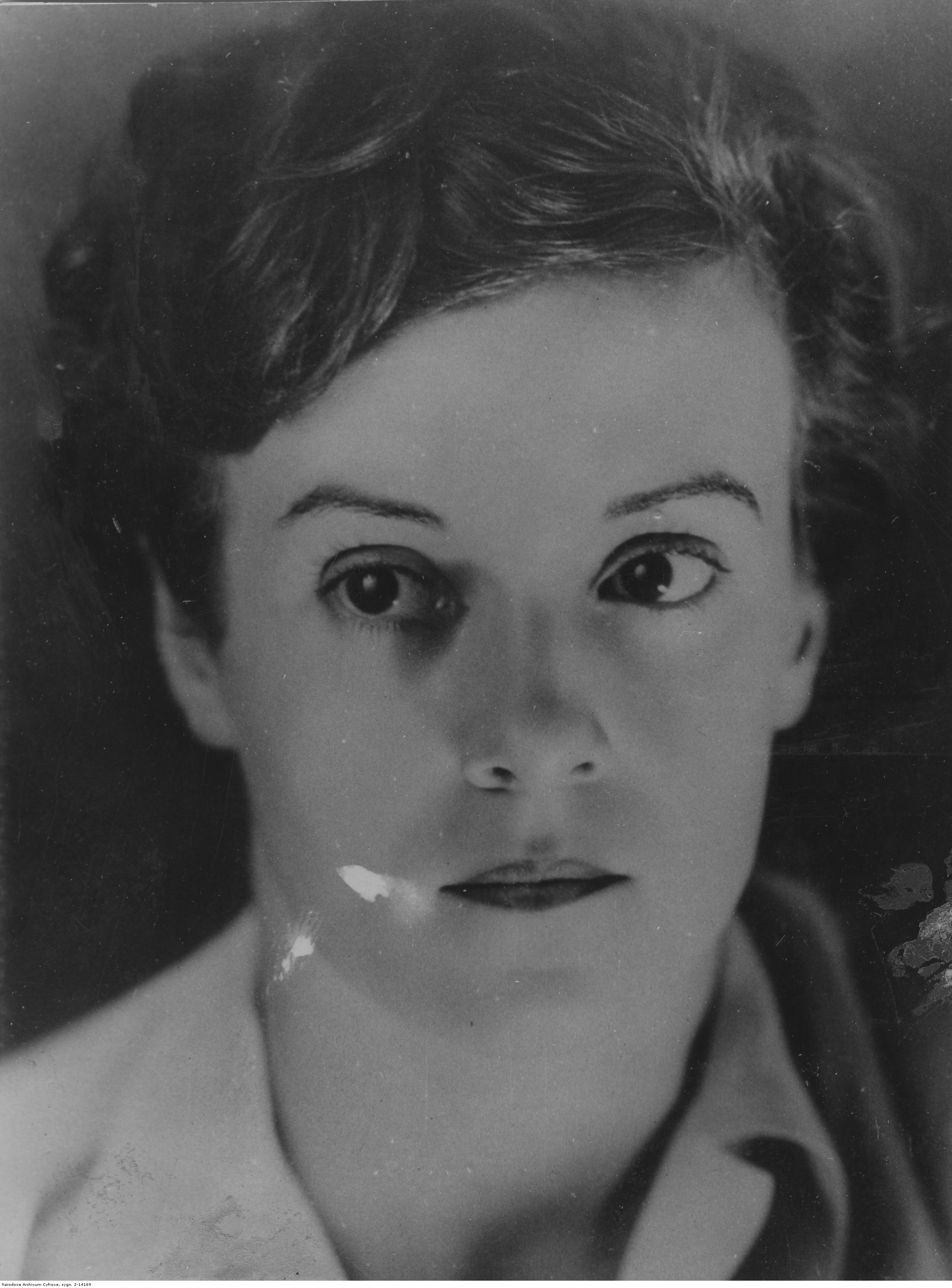
- Born: 2 December 1909
- Died: 18 June 1996 (aged 86)
- Occupation: Actress

Erika Dannhoff (2 December 1909 – 18 June 1996) was a German actress. She played the female lead in the 1935 mountain film Demon of the Himalayas.

== Filmography ==
Year	Title	Role	Notes
1929	The Man with the Frog		
1929	The Model from Montparnasse	Model	
1929	Heilige oder Dirne		
1929	Once You Give Away Your Heart	Kindermädchen	
1930	Marriage in Name Only	Erika, ihre Freundin	
1931	Circus Life		
1931	Mountains on Fire		Uncredited
1932	Tannenberg	Lita - von Arndts Schwägerin	
1932	Sacred Waters	Vroni Blatter	
1932	The Rebel	Gerrud Anderlan	
1934	Zimmermädchen... Dreimal klingeln	Ellen, dessen Frau	
1935	Demon of the Himalayas	Anne	
1935	Dreams of Love	Komtesse Maria Duday	
1935	Victoria	Camilla Seier	Uncredited
1936	The Cabbie's Song	Franzi Preminger, ein junges Mädchen	
1939	Waldrausch	Herzogin	
1950	The Axe of Wandsbek	Lene Prestow	
1953	No Way Back		
1956	The Story of Anastasia	Frau von Pleskau	
1960	Im Namen einer Mutter	Frau Mösner	
1961	Barbara	Sophie	
1977	Heinrich		
1980	Primel macht ihr Haus verrückt	Frau Graemlich	
1981	No Mercy, No Future	Tanzender Tod	
1982	The Magic Mountain	Muntere Dame	

== Bibliography ==
- Holt, Lee Wallace. Mountains, Mountaineering and Modernity: A Cultural History of German and Austrian Mountaineering, 1900-1945. ProQuest, 2008.
