= Hugo Lehner =

Swiss mountain guide and skier (1902–1952)

Hugo Lehner (1902 – 14 October 1952) was a Swiss mountain guide and skier. He competed together with Fritz Kuhn, Otto Furrer and Anton Julen in military patrol at the second winter Olympics in St. Moritz in 1928, where the team placed third.

Lehner also performed in famous movies such as Struggle for the Matterhorn (1928), in which he portrayed Charles Hudson, The Call of the North (1929), Mountains on Fire (1931) and The Rebel (1932).

== Selected filmography ==
- Struggle for the Matterhorn (1928)
- The Call of the North (1929)
- Mountains on Fire (1931)
- The Rebel (1932)
