= Cyanide (1930 film) =

1930 film

- Theatrical film poster
- German: Cyankali
- Directed by: Hans Tintner
- Written by: Friedrich Wolf (play); Hans Tintner
- Produced by: Helmut Schreiber
- Starring: Grete Mosheim; Nico Turoff; Claus Clausen; Margarete Kupfer
- Cinematography: Günther Krampf
- Music by: Willy Schmidt-Gentner
- Production company: Atlantis Film
- Distributed by: Deutsche Fox
- Release date: 23 May 1930
- Running time: 91 minutes
- Country: Germany
- Language: German

Cyanide (German: Cyankali) is a 1930 German drama film directed by Hans Tintner and starring Grete Mosheim, Nico Turoff and Claus Clausen. The film's art direction was by Franz Schroedter. The film is adapted from Friedrich Wolf's 1929 play of the same title, which addressed the issue of abortion. The film is part of the German tradition of Enlightenment films, popular during the Weimar Era. Originally made as a silent film, it had some dialogue and sound effects added to the soundtrack. It was distributed by the German branch of the Hollywood studio Fox Film. It premiered on 23 May 1930 on the same day as Westfront 1918.

== Cast ==
- Grete Mosheim as Hete Fent
- Nico Turoff as Paul
- Claus Clausen as Max
- Herma Ford as Frau Fent
- Margarete Kupfer as Madame Heye
- M. Anderson as Dr. Moeller
- Paul Henckels as Dr. Meier
- Louis Ralph as Hausverwalter
- Paul Kemp as Kuckuck
- Hermann Vallentin as Kommissar
- Josefine Dora as Frau Klee
- Else Heller as Frau Witt
- Alexander Murski as Herr Witt
