= The Challenge (1938 film) =

1938 British film by Milton Rosmer and Luis Trenker

- DVD cover
- Directed by: Milton Rosmer; Luis Trenker
- Written by: Patrick Kirwan; Milton Rosmer
- Screenplay by: Emeric Pressburger
- Produced by: Günther Stapenhorst; Alexander Korda
- Starring: Robert Douglas
- Cinematography: Albert Benitz; Georges Périnal
- Edited by: Edward B. Jarvis
- Music by: Allan Gray
- Production companies: Denham Films; London Film Productions
- Distributed by: United Artists
- Release date: 9 May 1938
- Running time: 76 minutes
- Country: United Kingdom
- Language: English

The Challenge is a 1938 British drama film directed by Milton Rosmer and Luis Trenker and starring Robert Douglas and Luis Trenker. The film is about the first successful ascent of the Matterhorn in 1865 by Edward Whymper.

This British film is one of two 1938 Trenker remakes of Struggle for the Matterhorn (German: Der Kampf ums Matterhorn) in which Trenker acted in 1928, the other being the German The Mountain Calls (German: Der Berg ruft).

== Cast ==
- Robert Douglas as Edward Whymper
- Frank Birch as Rev. Charles Hudson
- Geoffrey Wardwell as Lord Francis Douglas
- Moran Caplat as Mr. Hadow
- Lyonel Watts as F.K. Morris, Publisher
- Luis Trenker as Jean Antoine Carrel
- Mary Clare as Carrel's Mother
- Fred Groves as Bruno Favre, Innkeeper
- Joan Gardner as Felicitas Favre, Favre's Daughter
- Laurence Baskcomb as The Podesta, Mayor
- Ralph Truman as Signor Giordano
- Reginald Jarman as Minister Sella
- Tony Sympson as Luc Meynet
- Cyril Smith as Customs Officer
- Lloyd Pearson as Alexander Seiler, Innkeeper
- Violet Howard as Mrs. Seiler
- Babita Soren as Mrs. Croz
- Luis Gerold as Croz, Guide
- Max Holzboer as Peter Taugwalder Sr., Guide
- Emmerich Albert as A Ropemaker
- Howard Douglas as A Ropemaker

== See also ==
- The Mountain Calls (1938)
- First ascent of the Matterhorn
