= August Eichhorn =

German musician and cellist

August Theodor Eichhorn (30 July 1899 − 16 June 1980) was a German musician and professor for violoncello.

== Life ==
Born in Mainz, from 1933 until he was drafted into the military in 1942 Eichhorn was solo cellist at Leipzig's Gewandhaus and taught at the University of Music and Theatre Leipzig. He also taught at the Hochschule für Musik und Darstellende Kunst Mannheim and continued as a guest in Leipzig until 1961. His students included Reinhold Johannes Buhl, Siegfried Pank, Josef Schwab and Gerhard Mantel.

Eichhorn had a great influence on string pedagogy. He was one of the first whose teaching methods were based on scientific principles, the physiological possibilities of the human body and the physical conditions of the cello, as well as the findings of Steinhausen and Trendelenburg. For example, he coined the term "Trinity of Sound": it depends on the contact point, pressure and speed of the bow. He can be considered the founder of a new German cello school.

Eichhorn was one of the first students of Emanuel Feuermann in Cologne. With the help of knowledge gained from additional studies in anatomy and physics in Heidelberg, Eichhorn analysed Feuermann's game and developed, among other things, a theory of an artistically highly efficient biomechanical lever system in bogenführung, as he believed to have observed it in Feuermann. This lever system can be characterised by the fact that the bow guiding arm is set into mass balancing oscillations. Figuratively, this can be imagined as a chain of connected rockers, so that the mass inertia to be overcome in the bow guidance is reduced to a minimum. In such a mobile-like system of coupled oscillators, small muscular impulses can already keep relatively large reactionary movements in motion. Eichhorn subsequently attempted to give his students systematic artistic progress by communicating his theories. The relevance of the use of Eichhorn's movement model for the training of artistic expertise was rudimentarily proven in studies using three-dimensional computer-aided movement analysis (see Hasselbach & Gruhn & Gollhofer 2010, 2011). However, a more recent study showed that in a study of professional violinists from several German orchestras, no significant correlation could be found between the degree of mass balancing oscillations (MBOs) and the position achieved in the orchestra or the orchestra's reputation. However, highly significant correlations were found between the level of MBOs and the presence or severity of a play-related illness. (cf. Hasselbach & Gruhn & Gollhofer 2019) Conclusion: Eichhorn's movement model in terms of a biomechanical topology (cf. Bernstein 1996 and Schack 2010) seems to be just one possible route among many to artistic expertise, but one of the healthiest routes under professional stress in the long term. Other variables such as personality or marketing strategies seem to have a greater influence on concrete professional success than the learned movement model.

Eichhorn died in Bensheim at the age of 80.

== Sources ==
- Margarete Hopfer: Die Klanggestaltung auf Streichinstrumenten. Das Naturgesetz der Tonansprache. Kurze Einführung in die gestaltende Dynamik der Bogenmechanik von August Eichhorn. Kistner & Siegel, Leipzig 1941.
