= Struggle for the Matterhorn =

1928 film by Mario Bonnard and Nunzio Malasomma

- German theatrical release poster
- German: Muß man sich gleich scheiden lassen?
- Directed by: Mario Bonnard; Nunzio Malasomma
- Written by: Arnold Fanck; Nunzio Malasomma
- Based on: Der Kampf ums Matterhorn by Carl Haensel
- Starring: Luis Trenker; Marcella Albani; Alexandra Schmitt
- Cinematography: Sepp Allgeier; Willy Winterstein
- Production companies: Cinéfilm AG; Hom-AG für Filmfabrikation
- Distributed by: Universum Film AG
- Release dates: 27 November 1928 (Switzerland); 3 December 1928 (Germany)
- Running time: 82 minutes
- Countries: Germany; Switzerland
- Languages: Silent; German intertitles

Struggle for the Matterhorn (German: Der Kampf ums Matterhorn) is a 1928 German-Swiss silent drama film co-directed by Mario Bonnard and Nunzio Malasomma and starring Luis Trenker, Marcella Albani, and Alexandra Schmitt. The film is part of the popular cycle of mountain films of the 1920s and 1930s. Art direction was by Heinrich Richter. Trenker later remade the film as The Challenge in 1938.

It was shot at the Johannisthal Studios in Berlin and on location in Switzerland.

== Plot ==
Based on a 1928 novel by Carl Haensel, the film depicts the battle between British and Italian climbers to be the first to climb the Matterhorn.

== Cast ==
- Luis Trenker as Jean-Antoine Carrel
- Marcella Albani as Felicitas, Carrel's wife
- Alexandra Schmitt as Mother of Carrel
- Clifford McLaglen as Giaccomo
- Peter Voß as Edward Whymper
- Paul Graetz as Meynet
- Johanna Ewald as Meynet's wife
- Hannes Schneider as Cross
- Ernst Petersen as Hadow
- Hugo Lehner as Hudson
- Luggi as Lord Douglas
- Heinrich Gretler as Seiler, hotel Host
