= Harry R. Sokal =

German film producer

- Born: 20 February 1898; Craiova, Romania
- Died: 7 March 1979 (aged 81); Munich, West Germany
- Occupation: Film producer
- Years active: 1926–1977
- Spouse: Charlotte Kerr (before 1979)

Harry R. Sokal (20 February 1898 – 7 March 1979) was a Romanian-born German film producer. He produced 22 films between 1926 and 1977. After working in the German film industry, Sokal emigrated following the Nazi rise to power in 1933. He lived and worked in Britain, France and the United States, before returning to Germany in 1949. In 1963, he was a member of the jury at the 13th Berlin International Film Festival.

== Selected filmography ==
- The Wooing of Eve (1926)
- The Holy Mountain (1926)
- Two and a Lady (1926)
- Chance the Idol (1927)
- Eve's Daughters (1928)
- The White Hell of Pitz Palu (1929)
- The White Ecstasy (1931)
- Das Blaue Licht (1932)
- Adventures in the Engadin (1932)
- The Tsar's Diamond (1932)
- The White Hell of Pitz Palu (1950)
- Carnival in White (1952)
- Arms and the Man (1958)
