= Andrew Marton =

Hungarian-American film director (1904–1992)

- Born: 26 January 1904; Budapest, Hungary
- Died: 7 January 1992 (aged 87); Santa Monica, California, U.S.
- Occupations: Film director, second unit director
- Years active: 1929-1969
- Spouse: Jarmila Marton (1941-1992) (his death)

Andrew Marton (born Endre Marton; 26 January 1904 – 7 January 1992) was a Hungarian-American film director. In his career, he directed 39 films and television programmes, and worked on 16 as a second unit director, including the chariot race in Ben Hur (1959).

== Life and career ==
Marton was born in Budapest, Hungary. After high-school graduation in 1922, he was taken by Alfréd Deésy to Vienna to work at Sascha-Film, mostly as an assistant editor. After a few months, he caught the attention of director Ernst Lubitsch, who convinced him to try Hollywood. Marton returned to Europe in 1927 and worked as the main editor of the Tobis company in Berlin, and later as an assistant director in Vienna. He directed his Two O'Clock in the Morning, " his first feature film, in 1929 in Great Britain. He joined a German expedition to Tibet in 1934, where he filmed Demon of the Himalayas. Marton cited that he was Jewish as a reason that the film could not be released with his name as director, citing a conversation he had had with Nazi Propaganda Minister Joseph Goebbels.

After returning to Hungary, he directed his only Hungarian movie in 1935 in Budapest. Between 1936 and 1939, he worked with Alexander Korda in London. After the outbreak of World War II, he moved to the United States. During the 1940s and 1950s, he worked mostly for MGM Studios. In 1954, he founded his own production company with Ivan Tors, Louis Meyer and László Benedek. Ray worked as both a feature film director and a second unit director in many big-budget epic films. On 55 Days at Peking, Marton went from second unit direction to act as one of the film's uncredited additional directors, devising the film's opening sequence.

Marton was active until the middle of the 1970s. On 7 January 1992, he died of pneumonia in Santa Monica, California.

== Legacy ==
The works of Andrew Marton are focused on exoticism, nature, and spectacle. Besides feature films, he was also notable in television, creating several nature films and supervising episodes of series like Flipper and Daktari. Remembered for cinematic moments like the chariot race of Ben-Hur, or the battle scenes of A Farewell to Arms, he worked as second unit director for Hollywood directors, including William Wyler, Fred Zinneman, Joseph Mankiewicz and Mike Nichols. Director John Landis referred to Marton as his mentor.

== Selected filmography ==
=== Director ===
- Two O'Clock in the Morning (1929)
- The Night Without Pause (1931)
- North Pole, Ahoy (1934)
- Demon of the Himalayas (1935)
- Miss President (1935)
- Wolf's Clothing (1936)
- Secret of Stamboul (1936)
- School for Husbands (1937)
- A Little Bit of Heaven (1940)
- Gentle Annie (1944)
- Gallant Bess (1946)
- King Solomon's Mines (1950)
- Storm over Tibet (1951)
- The Wild North (1952)
- The Devil Makes Three (1952)
- Men of the Fighting Lady (1954)
- Gypsy Colt (1954)
- Prisoner of War (1954)
- Green Fire (1954)
- Seven Wonders of the World (1956)
- Underwater Warrior (1958)
- Oh Islam (1961)
- It Happened in Athens (1962)
- The Longest Day (1962)
- The Thin Red Line (1964)
- Crack in the World (1965)
- Clarence, the Cross-Eyed Lion (1965)
- Birds Do It (1966)
- Africa Texas Style (1967)

=== Second unit director ===
- The Seventh Cross (1944)
- Ben Hur (1959)
- Cleopatra (1963)
- The Last Roman (1968–69)
- Catch-22 (1970)
- Kelly's Heroes (1970)
- The Day of the Jackal (1973)
- The Message (1976), aka Mohammad, Messenger of God

=== Editor ===
- Eternal Love (1929)
- The Song Is Ended (1930)
- Him or Me (1930)
- Shadows of the Underworld (1931)
- I Go Out and You Stay Here (1931)
- A Tremendously Rich Man (1932)
- The Rebel (1932)
- Five from the Jazz Band (1932)
- The Prodigal Son (1934)
