= The Immortal Vagabond (1953 film) =

1953 film directed by Arthur Maria Rabenalt

- German: Der unsterbliche Lump
- Directed by: Arthur Maria Rabenalt
- Written by: Felix Dörmann (operetta); Edmund Eysler (operetta); Curt J. Braun
- Produced by: Otto Lehmann; Günther Stapenhorst
- Starring: Karlheinz Böhm; Ingrid Stenn; Heliane Bei
- Cinematography: Ernst W. Kalinke
- Edited by: Arthur Maria Rabenalt; Lilian Seng
- Music by: Bert Grund; Edmund Eysler (operetta)
- Production company: Carlton-Film
- Distributed by: Neue Filmverleih
- Release date: 18 December 1953
- Running time: 105 minutes
- Country: West Germany
- Language: German

The Immortal Vagabond (German: Der unsterbliche Lump) is a 1953 West German musical drama film directed by Arthur Maria Rabenalt and starring Karlheinz Böhm, Ingrid Stenn, and Heliane Bei. It is a remake of the 1930 film of the same title. It was shot at the Bavaria Studios in Munich and on location in Tyrol in Austria. The film's sets were designed by the art directors Willy Schatz and Felix Smetana.

== Cast ==
- Karlheinz Böhm as Johannes Ritter / Petroni
- Ingrid Stenn as Luisel Freytag
- Heliane Bei as Anna
- Hans Olden as Ederle
- Paul Esser as Florian
- Elise Aulinger as Frau Bürgermeister
- Paula Braend
- Peter Carsten
- Arno Ebert
- Hans Elwenspoek
- Erik Frey
- Willy Friedrichs
- Adalbert Fuhlrott
- Fred Kallmann
- Walter Ladengast
- Fritz Lafontaine
- Sepp Nigg
- Klaus Pohl
- Hans Hermann Schaufuß
- Bertl Schultes
- Minna Spaeth
- Uli Steigberg
