= Reckless Living (1931 film) =

1931 film

- Directed by: Cyril Gardner
- Screenplay by: Cyril Gardner; Tom Reed; Courtney Terrett
- Produced by: Cyril Gardner
- Starring: Ricardo Cortez; Mae Clarke; Norman Foster; Marie Prevost; Slim Summerville; Robert Emmett O'Connor
- Cinematography: Jackson Rose
- Edited by: Harry W. Lieb
- Production company: Universal Pictures
- Distributed by: Universal Pictures
- Release date: October 20, 1931
- Running time: 65 minutes
- Country: United States
- Language: English

Reckless Living is a 1931 American pre-Code drama film directed by Cyril Gardner and written by Cyril Gardner, Tom Reed and Courtney Terrett. The film stars Ricardo Cortez, Mae Clarke, Norman Foster, Marie Prevost, Slim Summerville and Robert Emmett O'Connor. The film was released on October 20, 1931, by Universal Pictures.

== Cast ==
- Ricardo Cortez as Curly
- Mae Clarke as Bee
- Norman Foster as Doggie
- Marie Prevost as Alice
- Slim Summerville as The Drunk
- Robert Emmett O'Connor as Ryan
- Thomas E. Jackson as McManus
- Louis Natheaux as Block
- Murray Kinnell as Alf
- Russell Hopton as Kid Regan
- Perry Ivins as Spike
- Brooks Benedict as Jerry
- Frank Hagney as Henchman
- Louise Beavers as Maid

== Plot ==
The film follows Janie Haines, a sharp, determined young woman from a modest background who is determined to rise above her circumstances. Working in the cutthroat world of advertising, Janie learns quickly that talent alone is rarely enough. Her wit, charm, and willingness to bend social expectations help propel her into higher circles, where power and privilege blur moral boundaries.

As Janie’s career advances, her personal life becomes increasingly complicated. She attracts the attention of influential men—some offering genuine affection, others seeking control or advantage, forcing her to navigate romantic entanglements that threaten both her independence and her integrity. Torn between love and ambition, Janie must confront the consequences of using relationships as stepping stones, even as she resists being used herself.

Ultimately, Reckless Living presents a cautionary yet sympathetic portrait of a woman striving for autonomy in a society stacked against her. With its frank treatment of gender dynamics, ambition, and emotional vulnerability, the film exemplifies early-1930s Hollywood’s willingness to grapple with adult themes before the full enforcement of the Production Code.
