= Luis Trenker =

South Tyrolean film producer, writer, actor (1892–1990)

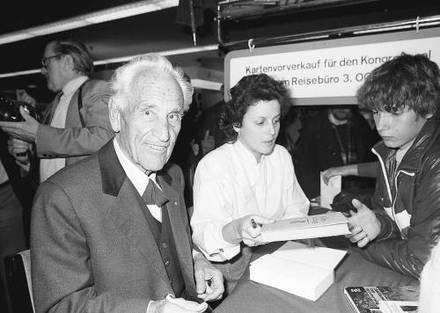
- Freiburg 1982
- Born: Alois Franz Trenker; 4 October 1892; Sankt Ulrich in Gröden, County of Tyrol, Austria-Hungary
- Died: 12 April 1990 (aged 97); Bozen, South Tyrol, Italy
- Occupations: Film producer, director, writer, actor, architect, bobsledder
- Years active: 1921–1982

Luis Trenker (born Alois Franz Trenker, 4 October 1892 – 12 April 1990) was an Italian, South Tyrolean film producer, director, writer, actor, architect, alpinist, and bobsledder.

== Biography ==
=== Early life ===
Alois Franz Trenker was born on 4 October 1892 in Urtijëi, Tyrol (German: St. Ulrich in Gröden, Italian: Ortisei) in the Austro-Hungarian Empire (in present-day northern Italy). His father Jacob Trenker was a painter from North Tyrol, and his mother Karolina (née Demetz) was from Urtijëi in Val Gardena. He grew up speaking two languages: German, the language of his father, and Ladin, the language of his mother. He attended the local primary school from 1898 to 1901, and then attended the Josefinum in Bolzano in 1902 and 1903. From 1903 to 1905, he attended the arts and crafts school in Bolzano, where he developed his skills as a woodcarver.

In 1912, he entered the Realschule in Innsbruck, where he studied Italian as a foreign language. There he began his middle school studies. During his high school years, he spent his holidays working for mountain guides and ski instructors. After his matriculation examinations in 1912, Trenker studied architecture at the Technical University in Vienna.

=== World War I ===
At the start of World War I, Trenker fought as a cadet in an Austro-Hungarian heavy artillery unit on the Eastern Front in Galicia and Russisch-Polen. From 1915 to 1918, he fought in the mountain war against Italy, from 1916 in one of the Mountain Guide Companies (k.k. Bergführerkompanien) in the Dolomites. At the end of the war he had achieved the rank of Lieutenant. He would write 23 books based on his war experiences, the most important of which were Fort Rocca Alta and Berge in Flammen, the latter of which was made into the 1931 film Mountains on Fire.

At the end of the war, Trenker made several unsuccessful attempts to start an architecture business in Bolzano. In 1924 he graduated from the Technical University of Graz, and then worked as an architect in Bolzano, forming a business partnership with the Austrian architect Clemens Holzmeister. In 1924, Trenker participated in the Winter Olympic Games in Chamonix as a member of the Italian five-man bobsled team. Under the leadership of Pilot Lodovico Obexer, they ended up in sixth place.

=== Film career ===
Trenker's first contact with film came in 1921, when he helped director Arnold Fanck on one of his mountain films. The main actor could not perform the stunts required, and so Trenker assumed the leading role. He gradually assumed more roles on the set, and by 1928 was directing, writing, and starring in his own films. By then, he had abandoned his job as an architect to concentrate on his films.

In 1928 he married Hilda von Bleichert, the daughter of a fabrics manufacturer from Leipzig, with whom he had four children. In 1932 Trenker created (with Curtis Bernhardt and Edwin H. Knopf) a historical film The Rebel. Trenker stated that the film's plotline of a Tyrolean mountaineer Severin Anderlan leading a revolt against occupying French forces in 1809, during the Napoleonic Wars. The greatest Tirolean patriot Andreas Hofer was a proto-type of "Severin Anderlan" ... Trenker was designed to mirror what was happening in contemporary Germany as it rejected the terms of the Treaty of Versailles.

The main theme of Trenker's work was the idealization of peoples connection with their homeland and pointing out the decadence of city life (most clearly visible in his 1934 film Der verlorene Sohn (The Prodigal Son). This loosely played into the hands of Nazi propagandists, who seized upon the nationalistic elements of his work. However, Trenker refused to allow his work to be subverted as such and eventually moved to Rome in 1940 to avoid further governmental pressure. After a pair of documentary films, however, Trenker returned to Bolzano and stopped making films. The style he had developed in the thirties was not limited to nationalistic, folkloristic, and heroic clichés. His impersonation of a hungry, downtrodden immigrant in depression era New York was regarded as one of the seminal scenes for future Italian neorealism by the likes of Roberto Rossellini.

=== After World War II ===
Trenker was accused of fascist opportunism after the war, but the charges were eventually dropped. In the 1950s, he returned to the movie industry, though by 1965 he was making primarily documentary films that focused on the Austrian province of Tyrol and South Tyrol (his homeland), which had become part of Italy. He also returned to writing about the mountains.

=== Later life ===
In 1988 Hilda Trenker von Bleichert died. Luis Trenker died on 13 April 1990 in Bolzano at the age 97. He was buried in his family's plot at Urtijëi. In 1992, for the centennial of his birth, his native town of Ortisei dedicated a monument that shows him in mountaineer garb while looking at the Langkofel, a mountain he liked to climb. In March 2004, the Museum Gherdëina displayed a collection of Trenker's belongings from a bequest of his family.

== Filmography ==
- Mountain of Destiny (1924), Der Berg des Schicksals, actor
- The Holy Mountain (1926), Der heilige Berg, actor
- The Great Leap (1927), Der große Sprung, actor
- Struggle for the Matterhorn (1928), Der Kampf ums Matterhorn, actor
- The Call of the North (1929), Der Ruf des Nordens, producer, actor
- The Son of the White Mountain (1930), Der Sohn der weißen Berge, director, story, actor
- The Great Longing (1930), Die große Sehnsucht, actor
- Les Chevaliers de la montagne (1930), Knights of the Mountains, writer, actor
- Die heiligen drei Brunnen (1930), actor
- Mountains on Fire (1931), Berge in Flammen, director, novel, screenplay, actor
- Doomed Battalion (1932), director, story, screenplay, actor
- The Rebel (1932), Der Rebell, director, story, actor
- The Prodigal Son (1934), director, novel, screenplay, actor
- Der Kaiser von Kalifornien (1936), producer, director, writer, actor
- Giovanni de Medici: The Leader (1937), director, story, screenplay, actor
- Condottieri (1937), director, story, screenplay, actor
- The Mountain Calls (1938), Der Berg ruft, director, writer, actor
- The Challenge (1938), director, actor
- Love Letters from Engadin (1938), Liebesbriefe aus dem Engadin, producer, director, writer, actor
- Boundary Fire (1939), producer
- Urlaub im Schnee (1939 short), producer
- The Fire Devil (1940), producer, director, writer, actor
- Der König der Berge (1940 short), producer, writer
- Pastor Angelicus (1942), director
- Germanin (1943), actor
- Monte Miracolo (1945), producer, director, screenplay, actor
- Barrier to the North (1950), Barriera a settentrione, Duell in den Bergen, director, writer, actor
- Aus König Laurins Rosengarten (1951), producer, actor
- Bergsommer (1952 short), producer
- An der Dolomitenstraße (1952 short), producer, director, writer
- Kleine Kletterfahrt (1952 short), producer, director, writer
- Niemals mutlos (1952 short), Don't Surrender Never!, producer, director, writer
- Gondelfahrt durch Venedig (1952 short), Venetian Walk, producer, director, writer
- Lofotenfischer (1952 short), The Lofoten Fisher, producer, director, writer
- Die Sphinx von Zermatt (1953 short), producer, director, writer
- Kavaliere im Eis (1954 short), producer, director, writer
- Escape to the Dolomites (1955), director, writer, actor
- S.O.S. Zinnennordwand (1955 short), director
- Gold aus Gletschern (1956), producer, director
- Von der Liebe besiegt (1956), director, novel, actor
- Wetterleuchten um Maria (1957), director
- Unser Freund, der Haflinger (1957 short), Our Friend Haflinger, producer, director
- Zwei Wege, ein Gipfel (1961 short), producer, director, writer
- His Best Friend (1962), His Best Friend, director, screenplay, actor
- Vacanze scambio (1962), director
- Luftsprünge (1969–70 television series), actor
- Skifreuden in den Dolomiten (1970 short), producer, director, writer
- Ich filmte am Matterhorn (1970), producer, director, writer
- Olympia (1971), actor
- Die Glückspirale (1971), actor
- Heimat aus Gottes Hand (1979), producer, director, writer
- Hochkant (1982), actor

== Bibliography ==
- Meine Berge (1931), with Walter Schmidkunz
- Berge in Flammen. Ein Roman aus den Schicksalstagen Südtirols (1931), with Walter Schmidkunz
- Kameraden der Berge (1932)
- Der Rebell. Ein Freiheitsroman aus den Bergen Tirols (1933)
- Berge und Heimat: Das Buch von den Bergen und ihren Menschen (1933), with Walter Schmidkunz
- Der verlorene Sohn. Roman (1934)
- Berge im Schnee. Das Winterbuch (1935)
- Helden der Berge. Roman (1936), with Karl Springenschmid und Walter Schmidkunz
- Leuchtendes Land. Roman (1937), with Karl Springenschmid
- Sperrfort Rocca Alta. Der Heldenkampf eines Panzerwerkes (1937)
- Hauptmann Ladurner. Ein Soldatenroman (1940)
- Der Feuerteufel. Ein Speckbacherroman (1940)
- Sterne über den Gipfeln. Roman (1942)
- Heimat aus Gottes Hand. Roman (1948)
- Duell in den Bergen. Ein Roman aus den Dolomiten (1951)
- Glocken über den Bergen. Roman (1952)
- Sonne über Sorasass. Ein heiterer Roman aus den Dolomiten (1953)
- Schicksal am Matterhorn. Roman (1957)
- Helden am Berg. Roman (1956)
- Das Wunder von Oberammergau. Roman (1960)
- Sohn ohne Heimat. Roman (1960)
- Die Farm am Kilimandscharo (1960)
- Der Kaiser von Kalifornien. Roman (1961)
- Alles gut gegangen. Geschichten aus meinem Leben (1965, autobiography)

== Honors and awards ==
- 1936 Venice Film Festival Award for Best Foreign Film for Der Kaiser von Kalifornien
- 1966 Cross of Honor of the City of Vienna
- 1966 Order of Merit of the Italian Republic
- 1977 Order of Merit of the State of Tyrol
- 1978 Karl Valentin Order of Merit
- 1979 Bavarian Order of Merit
- 1982 Deutscher Filmpreis for Outstanding Individual Contributions to German Cinema

== Gallery ==
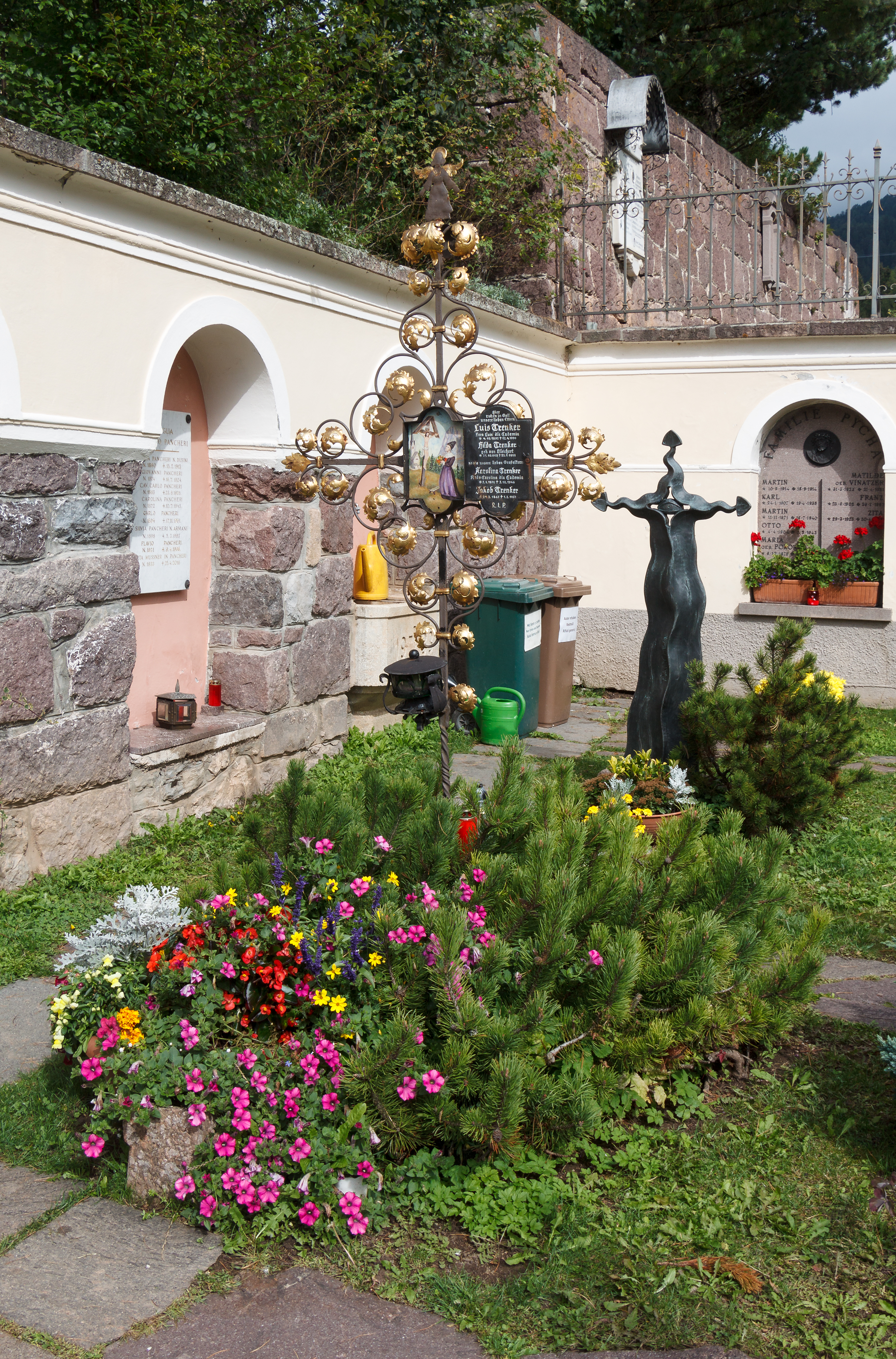
Luis Trenker's grave in Urtijëi

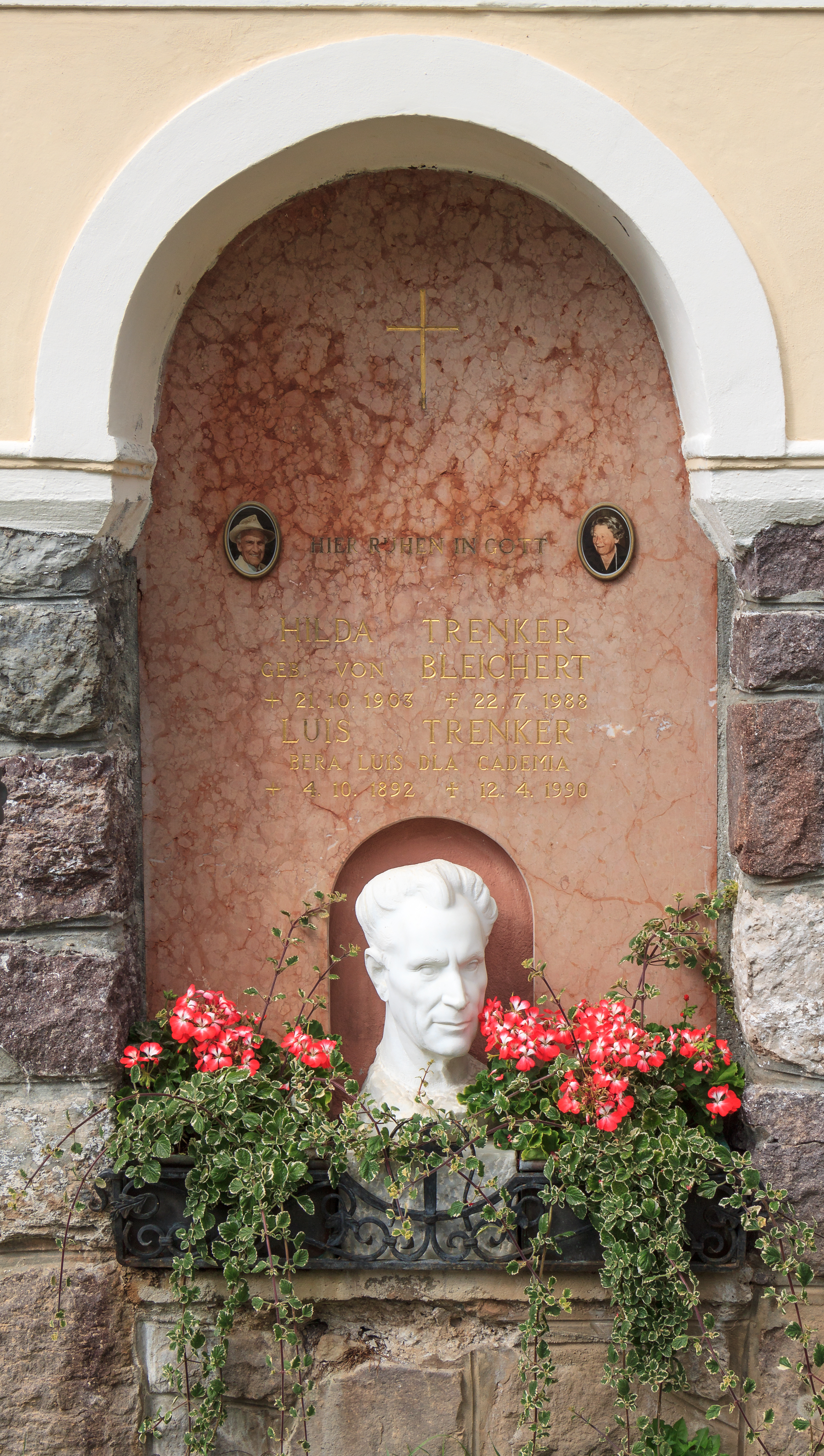
Memorial plaque near the grave

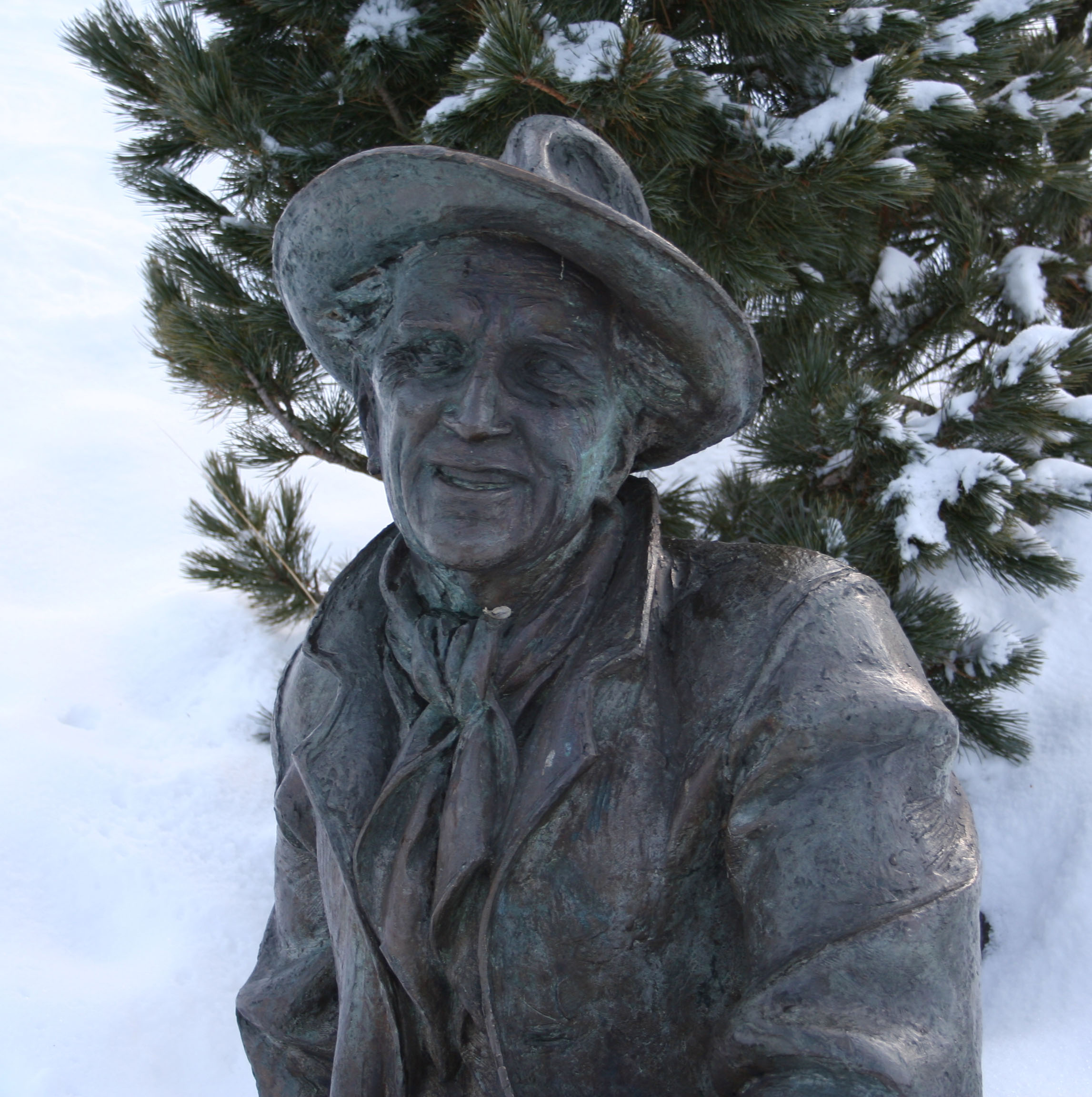
Luis Trenker memorial statue

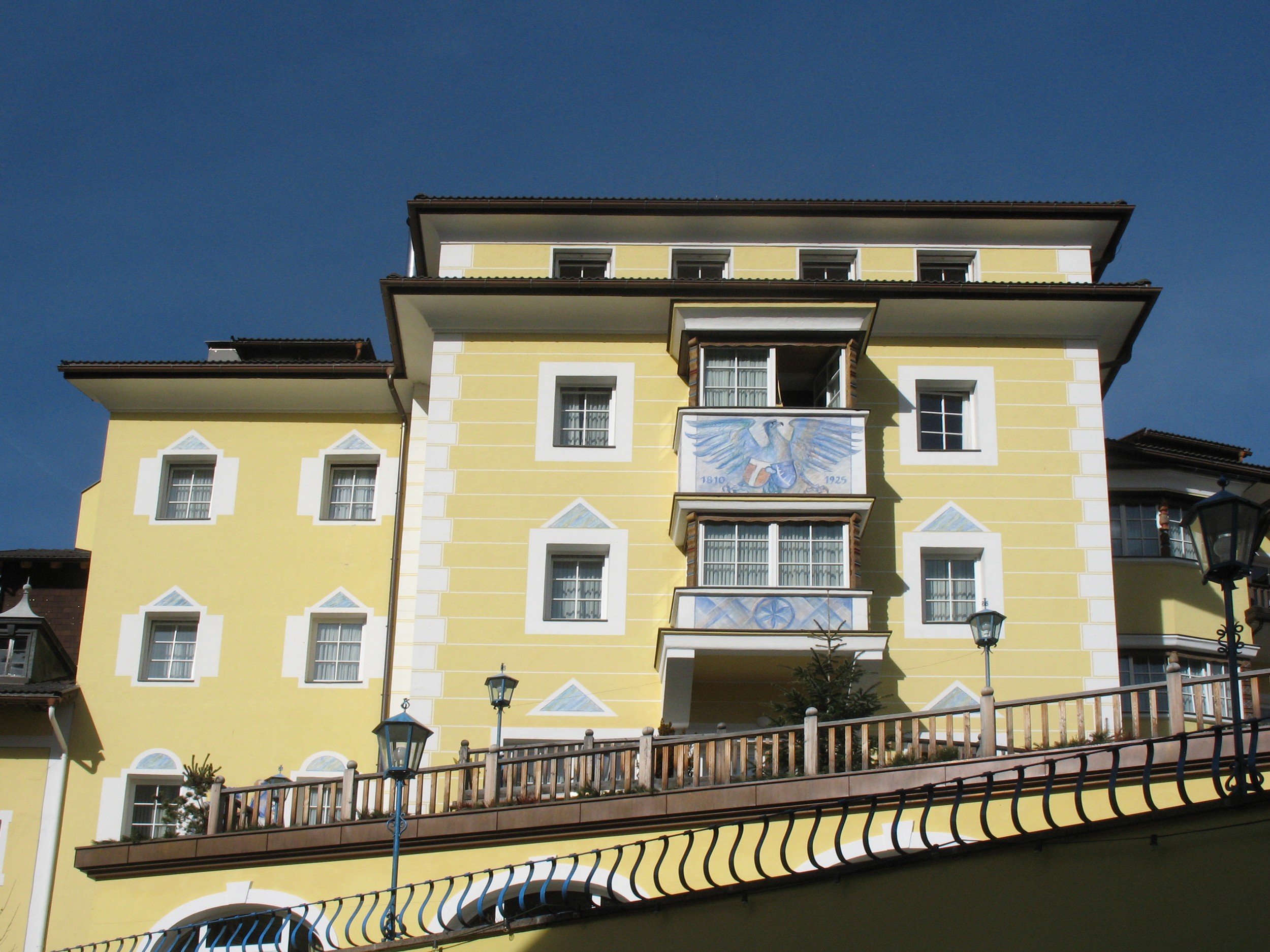
Hotel Adler designed by Luis Trenker and Clemens Holzmeister
