= The Prodigal Son (1934 film) =

- Directed by: Luis Trenker
- Written by: Luis Trenker; Reinhart Steinbicker; Arnold Ulitz
- Based on: Der verlorene Sohn by Luis Trenker
- Produced by: Paul Kohner
- Starring: Luis Trenker; Maria Andergast; Bertl Schultes; Marian Marsh
- Cinematography: Albert Benitz; Reimar Kuntze
- Edited by: Waldemar Gaede; Andrew Marton
- Music by: Giuseppe Becce
- Production company: Deutsche Universal-Film
- Distributed by: Universal Pictures
- Release date: 6 September 1934
- Running time: 102 minutes
- Country: Germany
- Language: German

The Prodigal Son (German: Der verlorene Sohn) is a 1934 German drama film directed by Luis Trenker and starring Trenker, Maria Andergast and Bertl Schultes. A South Tyrolean immigrates to New York City, but ultimately finding the U.S. is not for him, returns to his home village.

It was made by the German branch of Universal Pictures.

== Cast ==
- Luis Trenker as Tonio Feuersinger
- Maria Andergast as Barbl Gudauner
- Bertl Schultes as Barbl's father
- Marian Marsh as Lilian Williams
- F.W. Schröder-Schrom as Mr. Williams
- Jimmie Fox as Hobby
- Paul Henckels as the Teacher
- Eduard Köck as Tonio's father
- Melanie Horeschowsky as Rosina Unverdorben
- Emmerich Albert, Hans Jamnig, and Luis Gerold as Lumberjacks
- Lore Schuetzendorf as Rauhnacht maiden
- Lucie Euler as the Landlady
- Borwin Walth as the Butler

== Bibliography ==
- Hake, Sabine. Popular Cinema of the Third Reich. University of Texas Press, 2001.
