= German Tyrol =

Historic region in the Alps between Austria and Italy

Provinz Deutschtirol Province of German Tyrol
- Province of the German Austria
- 1918–1919
- Capital: Innsbruck
- Area
  - 1910: 20,039 km^{2} (7,737 sq mi)
- Population
  - 1910: 555,000
- History
  - Established: 12 November 1918
  - Treaty of Saint-Germain-en-Laye: 10 September 1919
Preceded by	Succeeded by
Austria-Hungary	First Austrian Republic; Kingdom of Italy
- Today part of: Austria; Italy

German Tyrol (German: Deutschtirol; Italian: Tirolo tedesco) is a historical region in the Alps now divided between Austria and Italy. It includes largely ethnic German areas of historical County of Tyrol: the Austrian state of Tyrol (consisting of North Tyrol and East Tyrol) and the province of South Tyrol but not the largely Italian-speaking province of Trentino (formerly Welschtirol).

== History ==
The provinces of German Austria 1918 with German Tyrol in gray

German Tyrol was historically an integral part of the Habsburg constituent Princely County of Tyrol but, with the imminent collapse of Habsburg Austria-Hungary at the end of World War I, areas of the empire with an ethnic German majority began to take actions to form a new state.

On 11 November 1918, Emperor Charles I of Austria relinquished power and, on 12 November, these ethnic German areas, including the Province of German Tyrol (German: Provinz Deutschtirol) were declared the Republic of German Austria with the intent of unifying with Germany. However, South Tyrol had been promised as spoils of war to Italy by the Entente powers in the Treaty of London. The remainder of German Tyrol became the Austrian federal state of Tyrol.

The status of Tyrol was definitively settled by the 1919 Treaty of Saint-Germain-en-Laye that established the division of the region that remains to this day.

== See also ==
- German Austria
- History of Tyrol
- Euroregion Tyrol-South Tyrol-Trentino
