= Doomed Battalion =

1932 film

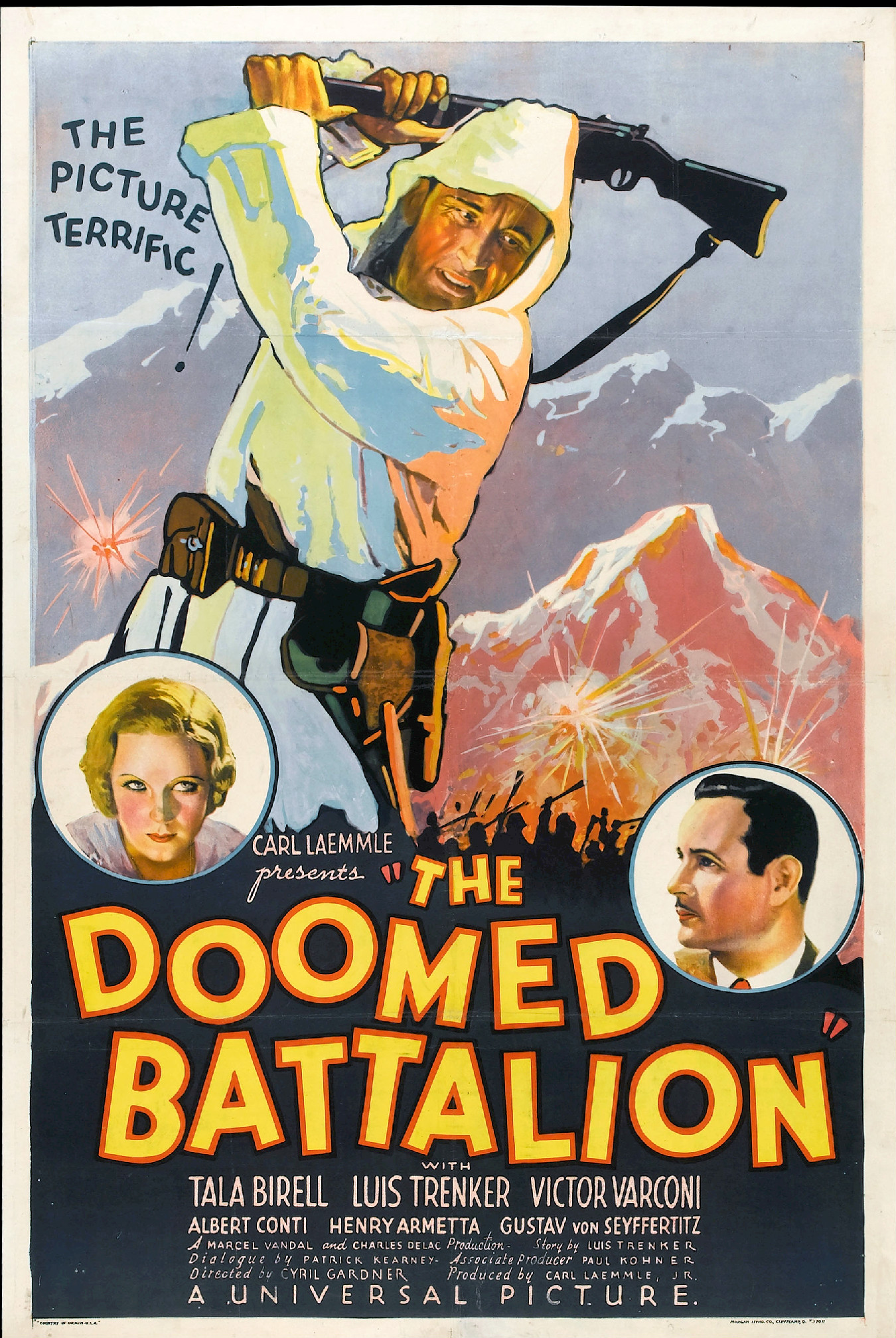
- Theatrical release poster
- Directed by: Cyril Gardner
- Screenplay by: Karl Hartl; Patrick Kearney; Paul Perez; Luis Trenker
- Story by: Luis Trenker
- Produced by: Carl Laemmle, Jr.
- Starring: Luis Trenker; Tala Birell; Albert Conti; Victor Varconi; Henry Armetta; Gustav von Seyffertitz
- Cinematography: Charles J. Stumar
- Edited by: Clarence Kolster
- Music by: Giuseppe Becce
- Production company: Universal Pictures
- Distributed by: Universal Pictures
- Release dates: April 30, 1932 (Washington, D.C.)
- Running time: 81 minutes
- Country: United States
- Language: English

Doomed Battalion is a 1932 American drama film directed by Cyril Gardner and written by Karl Hartl, Patrick Kearney, Paul Perez and Luis Trenker. The film stars Luis Trenker, Tala Birell, Albert Conti, Victor Varconi, Henry Armetta and Gustav von Seyffertitz.

== Cast ==
- Luis Trenker as Florian Di Mai
- Tala Birell as Maria Di Mai
- Albert Conti as Captain Kessler
- Victor Varconi as Artur Franchini
- Henry Armetta as Angelo
- Gustav von Seyffertitz as Austrian General
- C. Henry Gordon as Italian General
- Gibson Gowland as Innerhofer

== Production ==
The film had been filmed previously in German in 1931 as Berge in Flammen produced by Marcel Vandal and Charles Delac. Luis Trenker had also co-produced and starred in the German version.

The film was shot in the Austrian Tyrol. Footage was used from the 1931 German film.

== Reception ==
Universal claimed that this was 1932's equivalent of All Quiet on the Western Front. Variety said it was "Basically, not a woman's picture."
