= Ada Tschechowa =

Russian-German actress (1916–1966)

- Born: Ada Mikhailovna Chekhova; 9 September 1916; Moscow, Russia
- Died: 28 January 1966 (aged 49); Bremen, West Germany
- Occupations: Actress; director
- Spouses: Franz Weihmayr (div. 1934) Wilhelm Rust (div. 1950) Conny Rux (m. 1950)
- Children: 2, including Vera
- Father: Michael Chekhov
- Relatives: Alexander Chekhov (grandfather); Anton Chekhov (great-uncle); Lev Knipper (uncle); Olga Knipper (great-aunt); Marina Ried (cousin)

Ada Tschechowa (born Ada Mikhailovna Chekhova; (Note: In this name that follows East Slavic naming customs, the patronymic is Mikhailovna and the family name is Chekhova.) Russian: Ада Михайловна Чехова; 9 September 1916 – 28 January 1966) was a Russian-German actress and music manager.

== Life ==
Ada Mikhailovna Chekhova was born to esteemed actors Olga and Michael Chekhov on 9 September 1916 in Moscow, Russia. In 1921, her family moved to Berlin, where she grew up. From a young age, Ada followed in the path of her parents and grew an interest in becoming a theater actress, which led her to attending the Staatliche Schauspielschule in Berlin and taking private lessons with Walter Franck.

In April 1935, she tried out for and was accepted for an Austrian production of The Pompadour and The Empress's Favourite the following year. Until the end of World War II she played in two more movies, and then in Secret of a Marriage in 1951. Ada played primarily in the theater for the Agency for Film and Television in the Berlin artist's colony and supervised such people as Angelika Meissner and Rex Gildo.

Until 1934, Ada was married to cinematographer Franz Weihmayr, then to physician Wilhelm Rust until 1950, and finally with boxer Conny Rux, with whom she had a son, Mikhail, called "Mischa".

From her second marriage, Ada gave birth to a daughter, Vera, in 1940. Ada, according to her daughter, was very protective of Vera. In one instance, recorded in an interview with Frau im Spiegel and Vera Tschechowa, Elvis Presley met Vera and asked if he could accompany her home, an offer was negatively received by Ada.

Ada died in the Lufthansa Flight 005 accident near Bremen, Germany, on 28 January 1966 at the age of 49, and was buried at Friedhof Gräfelfing, Gräfelfing, near Munich.

== Selected filmography ==
- With the Eyes of a Woman (1942)
- The Secret of a Marriage (1951)
