= Immenhof films =

The Immenhof films were a series of German Heimatfilme ("homeland films") that appeared in cinemas between 1955 and 1974. They were set on the fictitious farm estate of Immenhof in Schleswig-Holstein. First appearing in the 1950s as a successful trilogy, they were followed in the 1970s by two further films. January 2019 will see the release of a fresh interpretation entitled Immenhof – Das Abenteuer eines Sommers (Immenhof – A Summer Adventure).

== Production ==
Following the success of the novel Dick und Dalli und die Ponies by Ursula Bruns, Gero Wecker acquired the film rights for his company, Arca-Filmproduktion GmbH in Göttingen. As he was busy with other projects, his wife, Carola Bornée, took over the production management. The success in 1955 of the first Immenhof film had led by 1957 to two sequels overseen by other directors. Then, 16 years later, Wecker took back control of the Immenhof films, a situation that would continue until his death.

The ZDF family TV series, Immenhof, that was made between 1993 and 1995 did not directly relate to the five Immenhof films on the big screen. The events in the films are not mentioned in the TV series – indeed there is even a partial contradiction.

== Cinema films ==
Series number	Image	Title	Year	Direction	Production
1	130px	Die Mädels vom Immenhof (The Immenhof Girls)	1955	Wolfgang Schleif	Arca-Filmproduktion GmbH
2	130px	Hochzeit auf Immenhof (Wedding at Immenhof)	1956	Volker von Collande	Arca-Filmproduktion GmbH
3	130px	Ferien auf Immenhof (Holiday at Immenhof)	1957	Hermann Leitner	Arca-Filmproduktion GmbH
4	130px	Die Zwillinge vom Immenhof (The Immenhof Twins)	1973	Wolfgang Schleif	Arca-Filmproduktion GmbH
5	130px	Frühling auf Immenhof (Spring at Immenhof)	1974	Wolfgang Schleif	Arca-Filmproduktion GmbH

== Locations ==
=== Immenhof (1955 - 1957) ===
The location for the 1955-1957 trilogy was the Rothensande estate at Malente in the district of Ostholstein. Other exterior scenes for the first three Immenhof films were also filmed in and around Malente. Filming took place at Eutin, Lübeck, Malente, Niendorf and Plön. However, the interiors of the Immenhof family home were shot in the studio.

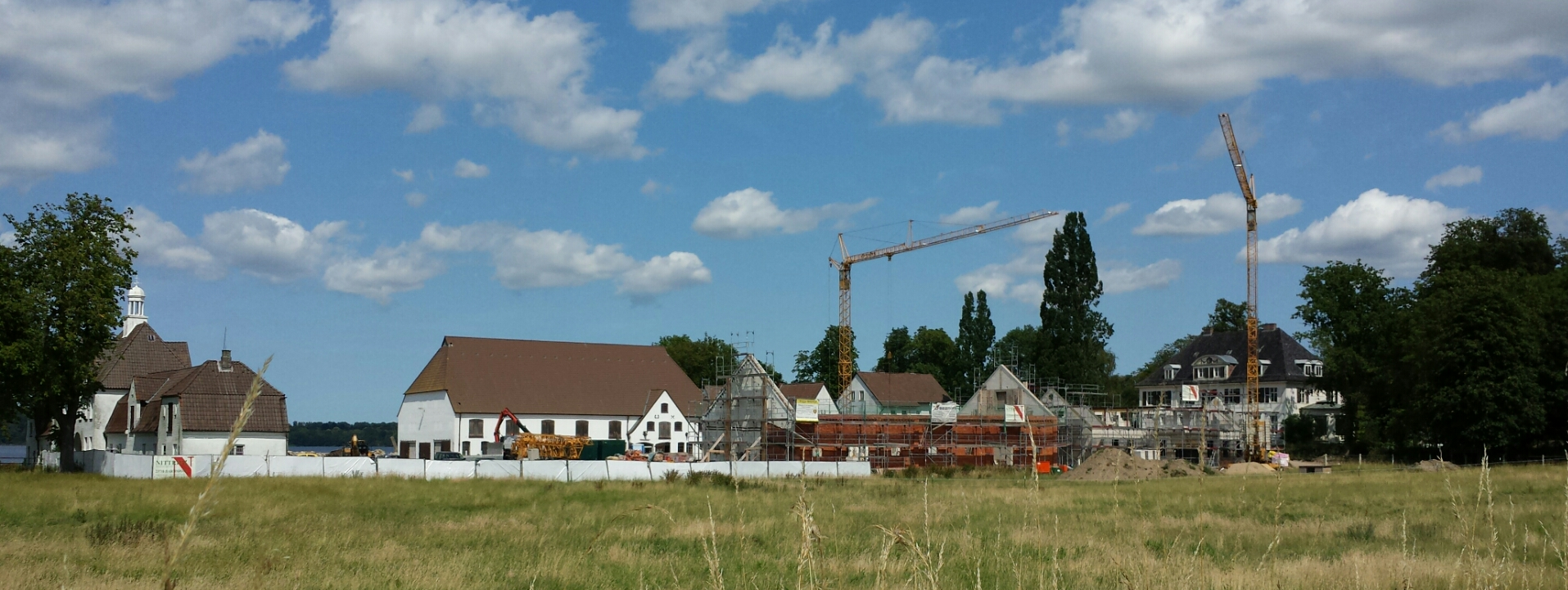
Rothensande Farm Estate at Malente (Image 2015)

=== Immenhof (1973 - 1974) ===
The Rothensande estate was not used between 1973 and 1974. These latter scenes were mainly shot at the Kletkamp estate, with some scenes at the Hof Radlandsichten near Timmdorf. The Kletkamp estate served as the background for shots at the Hof Randlandsichten. The latter offers holidays at the farmhouse that was used for filming, the living room being retained as it was in the film.

=== Forsthaus Dodau (Forest house Dodau) ===
This forest house, the Dodau forest ranger's office, stands in the grounds of the Schleswig-Holstein State Forestry Agency. In the film this is the home of the riding instructor, Jochen von Roth. There is no public access to this property but a path runs past the site and the buildings remain almost as portrayed in the film. The house is situated some three kilometres from Eutin near the famous oak tree known as the Bräutigamseiche, the Bridegroom's Oak.

=== Badestelle am Redderkrug (The Bathing Spot) ===
The Badestelle am Redderkrug is situated at the far end of the great Eutiner lake. It was here that Ethelbert's riding kit was hidden in the branches of the old beech tree. A lightning strike destroyed all but the stump of the tree and now nothing whatsoever remains. Yet even without the beech tree, this former film location remains a spot ever to be associated with the film. However, the area is now private property and is not accessible.

=== The Wedding Church ===
In the film Hochzeit auf Immenhof (1956) the wedding of Jochen and Margot was shot at the Maria-Magdalene Protestant church in Malente. The ceremony was conducted by an actual minister, something considered by many to be a scandal – they maintained that even a film wedding had a religious significance. However, the matter was settled when Paul Klinger (Jochen) pointed out that he and Karin Andersen (Margot) had already been married in real life for two years. The church is situated in the centre of Malente and has not undergone any exterior or interior alterations since 1956.

=== Primary School ===
The school scenes with the twins Billy and Bobby were filmed in the primary school at Malente. The classrooms that appear in the film remain unchanged to this day.

== Notes ==
1. Ursual Bruns (1922 – 2016) was a German author and equestrian expert. She was also one of the founding members and first Secretary of the German Pony Club.
2. Karin Andersen (1927 – 2013) was a German actress. She started out as a photographer and met the actor Paul Klinger in 1950 while working on a film set. The couple married in 1954.
