= Foolishness of His Love =

1929 film

- Directed by: Olga Chekhova
- Written by: Henry Bataille (play); Carl Heinz Jarosy
- Produced by: Olga Chekhova
- Cinematography: Franz Planer
- Music by: Artur Guttmann
- Production company: Tschechowa Film
- Distributed by: Terra Film
- Release date: August 1929
- Running time: 90 minutes
- Country: Germany
- Languages: Silent; German intertitles

Foolishness of His Love (German: Der Narr seiner Liebe) is a 1929 German silent film directed by Olga Chekhova and starring Michael Chekhov, Dolly Davis, and Alice Roberts.

The film's art direction was by Andrej Andrejew.

== Cast ==
- Michael Chekhov as Didier Mireuil, genannt Poliche
- Dolly Davis as Rosette von Rinck
- Alice Roberts as Pauline
- Oreste Bilancia as Lecointe, Mireuils Geschäftsfreund
- Marion Gerth as Burgermeister's Tochter
- Otto Wallburg as Bürgermeister Boudier
- Ekkehard Arendt as Herrenreiter Saint Vast
- Olga Chekhova
- Gunnar Tolnæs
- Eva Speyer
- Jack Trevor
- Oskar Wullhusq

== Bibliography ==
- Bock, Hans-Michael; Bergfelder, Tim, eds. (2009). The Concise Cinegraph: Encyclopaedia of German Cinema. New York: Berghahn Books. ISBN 978-1-57181-655-9.
