= Mr. Kettle and Mrs. Moon =

Comedy play by J. B. Priestley

- Written by: J.B. Priestley
- Original language: English
- Genre: Comedy

Premiere
- Date premiered: 1955
- Place premiered: Duchess Theatre, London

Mr. Kettle and Mrs. Moon is a comedy play by the British writer J.B. Priestley first staged in 1955 at the Duchess Theatre in London. The original cast featured Clive Morton and Fanny Rowe in the title roles and was directed by Tony Richardson. It ran for 211 performances. It is also known by the longer title The Scandalous Affair of Mr Kettle and Mrs Moon.

Other cast members included Beckett Bould, Wendy Craig and Richard Warner.

== Adaptation ==
In 1959 it served as the basis for a German film And That on Monday Morning directed by Luigi Comencini and starring Ulla Jacobsson and Vera Tschechowa.

== Bibliography ==
- Maggie B. Gale. J.B. Priestley. Routledge, 2008.
