= The Twins from Immenhof =

- Directed by: Wolfgang Schleif
- Written by: Wolfgang Schleif; Kurt Nachmann
- Produced by: Gero Wecker
- Starring: Heidi Brühl; Horst Janson; Olga Chekhova
- Cinematography: Igor Oberberg
- Edited by: Eva Storek
- Music by: Kai Rautenberg
- Production company: Arca-Winston Films
- Distributed by: Constantin Film
- Release date: 18 December 1973
- Running time: 94 minutes
- Country: West Germany
- Language: German

The Twins from Immenhof (German: Die Zwillinge vom Immenhof) is a 1973 West German family drama film directed by Wolfgang Schleif and starring Heidi Brühl, Horst Janson and Olga Chekhova. Set in Schleswig-Holstein, the film is in the post-war Heimatfilm tradition.

It is part of the series of Immenhof films, continuing on from a trilogy of 1950s films in which Brühl had starred. It was followed by the sequel Spring in Immenhof the following year.

== Cast ==
- Heidi Brühl as Brigitte 'Dalli' Voss
- Horst Janson as Alexander Arkens
- Olga Chekhova as Großmutter Arkens
- Birgit Westhausen as Sibylle 'Billy' Arkens
- Bettina Westhausen as Roberta 'Bobby' Arkens
- Jutta Speidel as Anke
- Katharina Brauren as Mutter Karstens, Mutter Dorfkrug
- Vera Gruber as Stine
- Bernd Herzsprung as Klaus
- Franz Schafheitlin as Dr. Tiedemann, Tierarzt
- Günter Lüdke as Ole
- Alexander Hegarth as Chef von Brigitte Voss
- Rudolf W. Marnitz as Briefträger Bormeister
- Rudolf Schündler as Lehrer Zwilling

== Bibliography ==
- Hans-Michael Bock and Tim Bergfelder. The Concise Cinegraph: An Encyclopedia of German Cinema. Berghahn Books, 2009.
