= Igor Oberberg =

German cinematographer

- Born: 20 February 1907; Russian Empire
- Died: 22 December 1996 (aged 89); Berlin, Germany
- Occupation: Cinematographer
- Years active: 1932–1974 (film)

Igor Oberberg (1907–1996) was a Russian Empire-born German cinematographer. His younger sister Ira Oberberg became a film editor.

== Life and career ==
Oberberg came to Germany in 1919. From 1926 to 1927 he completed a photographic education at the Photoshule Lette club. In 1927 he began to work as a clutter assistant for the movie. After that he became a camera assistant and worked in this function at numerous productions. Since 1939 he was chief cameraman and mostly participated in entertainment films, but also on propaganda films like submarines westward! and GPU.

== Selected filmography ==
- Congo Express (1939)
- The Red Terror (1942)
- Don't Talk to Me About Love (1943)
- Life Calls (1944)
- Harald Arrives at Nine (1944)
- Under the Bridges (1946)
- In Those Days (1947)
- The Prisoner (1949)
- This Man Belongs to Me (1950)
- The Beautiful Galatea (1950)
- A Day Will Come (1950)
- The Sinful Border (1951)
- Toxi (1952)
- Homesick for You (1952)
- Queen of the Arena (1952)
- The Dancing Heart (1953)
- The Stronger Woman (1953)
- Captain Wronski (1954)
- The Perfect Couple (1954)
- The Captain and His Hero (1955)
- Das Mädchen Marion (1956)
- Made in Germany (1957)
- One Prettier Than the Other (1961)
- The Twins from Immenhof (1973)
- Spring in Immenhof (1974)

== Bibliography ==
- Fenner, Angelica. Race Under Reconstruction in German Cinema: Robert Stemmle's Toxi. University of Toronto Press, 2011.
