= Vadim Glowna =

German actor (1941–2012)

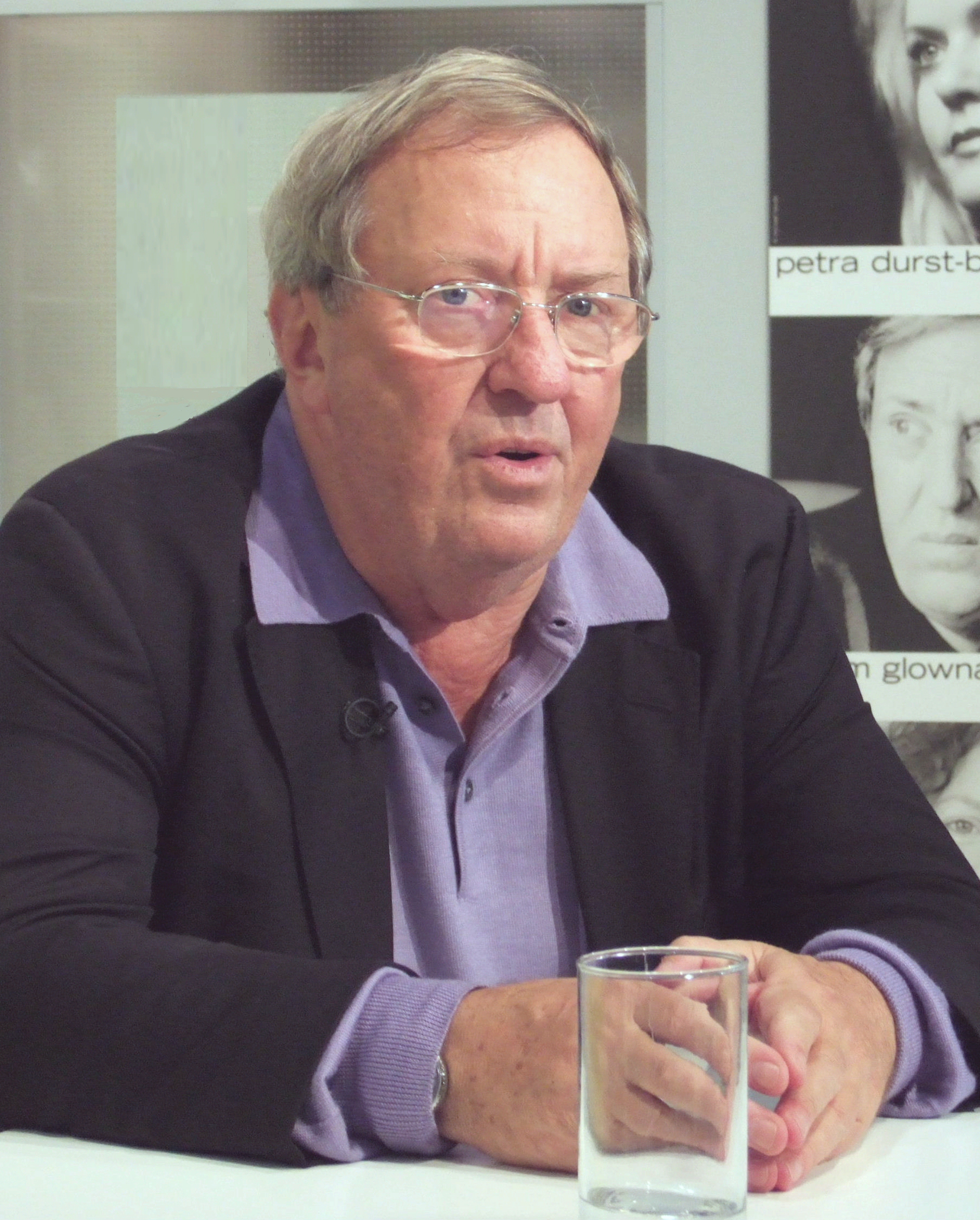
- Glowna in 2006
- Born: 26 September 1941; Eutin, Germany
- Died: 24 January 2012 (aged 70); Berlin, Germany
- Occupations: Actor; film director; screenwriter; producer
- Years active: 1964–2012
- Spouse: Vera Tschechowa (m. 1967; div. 1990)

Vadim Glowna (German pronunciation: [ˈvaːdim ˈɡlɔvna]; 26 September 1941 – 24 January 2012) was a German actor and film director. Since 1964, he appeared in more than 150 films and television shows.

He directed the 1983 film Dies rigorose Leben, which won an Honourable Mention at the 33rd Berlin International Film Festival. In 1989, he was a member of the jury at the 39th Berlin International Film Festival. Three years later, his film Rising to the Bait was entered into the 42nd Berlin International Film Festival.

== Selected filmography ==
Actor

- Immensee (1943), as Baby (uncredited)
- Im Schatten einer Großstadt (1965, TV film), as Johnny
- Frühlings Erwachen (1966, TV film), as Melchior Gabor
- Zuchthaus (1967, TV film), as Robert Labitzke
- A Premeditated Crime (1967, TV film), as Anton Katz
- Liebe und so weiter (1968), as Rob Studebecker
- Tramp oder Der einzige und unvergleichliche Lenny Jacobson (1968, TV film), as Guido
- Horror (1969, TV film), as Alex
- 11 Uhr 20 (1970, TV miniseries), as Lassowski
- The Body in the Thames (1971), as David Armstrong
- Dog's Heart (1976), as Schwonder
- Police Python 357 (1976), as Inspector Abadie
- Sladek oder Die schwarze Armee (1976, TV film), as Franz
- The Brothers (1977)
- Cross of Iron (1977), as Gefreiter (Pvt.) Kern
- Group Portrait with a Lady (1977), as Erhard Schweigert
- The Main Actor (1977), as Max Schneider
- The Tailor from Ulm (1978), as Kaspar Fesslen
- Das verschollene Inka-Gold (1978, TV film), as Brian Jones
- Germany in Autumn (1978), as Freiermuth
- Bloodline (1979), as Dr. Emile Joeppli
- The Associate (1979), as Marc Duphorin
- Tales from the Vienna Woods (1979), as Beichtvater
- The Martian Chronicles (1980, TV miniseries), as Sam Hinkston
- Death Watch (1980), as Harry Graves
- Exil (1981, TV miniseries), as Fritz Benjamin
- Desperado City (1981), as Paul
- High Society Limited (1982), as Raimund
- Daimler-Benz Limousine (1982), as German Consul von Ziegler
- Dies rigorose Leben (1983), as Bräutigam
- Edith's Diary (1983), as Paul Baumeister
- Bluebeard (1984, TV Movie), as Dr. Felix Schaad
- A Year of the Quiet Sun (1984), as Herman
- Das Totenreich (1986, TV film), as Mads Vestrup
- Runaway Horse (1986, TV film), as Helmut Halm
- Tarot (1986), as Autofahrer
- Devil's Paradise (1987), as Kapitän Davidson
- Opération Ypsilon (1987, TV miniseries), as Otchenko
- Wherever You Are... (1988), as German professor
- Three D (1988), as Juror
- The Play with Billions (1989, TV film), as Zurstiege
- Er – Sie – Es (1989), as Professor Leitner
- Seven Minutes (1989), as Kaufmann
- Quiet Days in Clichy (1990)
- L'assassina (1990), as Gambrini
- The Second Life (1990, TV film), as Donald Anders
- Die Spitzen der Gesellschaft (1990), as Zupan
- Extralarge: Miami Killer (1991, TV series episode), as Silveth
- Dunckel (1998, TV film), as Karl Dunckel
- No Place to Go (2000), as Bruno
- Cold Is the Evening Breeze (2000), as Eberhard Hoffmann
- Les Misérables (2000, TV miniseries), as Fauchelevent
- Viktor Vogel – Commercial Man (2001), as Werner Stahl
- The Middle of Nowhere (2001), as Neumann
- Planet of the Cannibals (2001), as Oskar Wagenknecht the Cannibal
- Baader (2002), as Kurt Krone
- One Hell of a Night (2002, TV film), as Rocco
- Angst (2003), as Klaus
- Sternzeichen (2003), as Kanzleichef Boley
- Swabian Children (2003, TV film), as Kaspar's Father
- Mein Name ist Bach (2003), as Johann Sebastian Bach
- Agnes and His Brothers (2004), as Günther Tschirner
- The Rose Gardener (2004, TV film), as Julien Lacroix
- Mutterseelenallein (2005), as Anwalt
- Lapislazuli: In the Eyes of the Bear (2006), as Hermit
- Four Minutes (2006), as Gerhard von Loeben
- Das Haus der schlafenden Schönen (2006), as Edmond
- Operation Guardian Angel (2009, TV film), as Werner Sievert
- Hitler's Grave (2010), as Grand Rabbi
- Borgia (2011, TV Series), as Cardinal Jorge da Costa
- Jack Irish (Two Australian television films) (2012), as Charlie Taub
- Into the Blue (2012), as Abraham Rabenthal

Director

- Desperado City (1981)
- Dies rigorose Leben (1983)
- Devil's Paradise (1987)
- Rising to the Bait (1992)
- Das Haus der schlafenden Schönen (2006)
