= Muriel Baumeister =

German-Austrian actress (born 1972)

- Born: Muriel Baumeister Noël; 24 January 1972 (age 53); Salzburg, Austria
- Website: http://www.hoestermann.de/de/ensemble/actor647.html

Muriel Baumeister (born 24 January 1972) is a German-Austrian film and television actress. She was born in Salzburg.

== Selected filmography ==
- Rising to the Bait (1992)
- Blame It on the Bossa Nova (1992, TV film)
- Mutter, ich will nicht sterben! (1994, TV film)
- I Love My Daughter's Husband (1995, TV film)
- Life Is a Bluff (1996)
- Knockin' on Heaven's Door (1997)
- Berlin – Moskau (1997, TV film)
- Un prete tra noi (1998, TV miniseries)
- Siska – Episode: Mord frei Haus (1999, TV series)
- Birds of a Feather (2000, short film)
- Enfermo de amor (2001, TV film)
- Die Überlebende (Survivor) (2001, short film)
- Dracula (2002, TV miniseries)
- The Amber Amulet (2004, TV miniseries)
- Bis in die Spitzen (2005, TV series)
- Kidnapping McKinsey (2006, TV film)
- A Risk Worth Taking (2008, TV film)
- The Visit (2008, TV film)
- Factor 8 (2009, TV film)
- Amfuem (2009, short film)
- Inseln vor dem Wind (2012, TV film)
- A World Beyond (2013, TV film)
- George (2013, TV film)
