= Das Mädchen Marion =

1956 film

- Directed by: Wolfgang Schleif
- Screenplay by: Felix Lützkendorf
- Produced by: Hans Raspotnik
- Cinematography: Igor Oberberg
- Edited by: Hermann Ludwig
- Music by: Mark Lothar
- Production company: Bendestorf
- Release date: 25 October 1956
- Running time: 88 minutes
- Country: West Germany
- Language: German

Das Mädchen Marion (alternatively known as Preis der Nationen) is a German Heimatfilm that premiered on 26 October 1956.

== Plot ==
The young Marion von Hoff lives with her widowed mother Vera on their estate in East Prussia. As the Trakehner Breeding Farm was evacuated in the winter of 1944/1945, the farm's manager Kalweit along with his men and many valuable Trakehner studs arrive at the von Hoff estate. Kalweit convinces Vera von Hoff to leave the estate and to flee westward. Before he dies as a consequence of stress from fleeing the stud farm, Kalweit entrusts Marion von Hoff with the newly born Trakehner foal Prusso, for whom he predicts a bright future in equestrian sports based on his pedigree.

Along with the other refugees and with a heavy heart, mother and daughter leave their home and flee with Prusso and their most valuable possessions in a cart as the Second World War reaches its end. After being turned away many times, the von Hoffs are finally taken in by Mrs. Buddensiek on her farm in Lower Saxony.

As time passes, Prusso grows into a stately horse that is envied by many. When Dr. Peter Meining, the local veterinarian, prevents Prusso's theft, Marion falls in love with him. However, Marion does not realize that Dr. Meining's interests are instead directed at her mother. As Vera one day helps him deliver a newborn foal, Dr. Meining finally reveals the nature of his intentions to Vera. She reciprocates but tells him to hide their feelings for the moment in order to avoid hurting love-struck Marion.

At Russo's first tournament debut, he is ridden by Dr. Meining. Dr. Meining sets an overly-quick tempo and suffers a hard fall as a result. Vera cares for Dr. Meining while Marion retrieves Russo. As she makes a chance glance out a window, she suddenly sees the sort of close relationships that has developed between her mother and Dr. Meining. In her shock, she attempts to drown herself, but her swimming instinct is too powerful and she eventually washes up unconscious on the riverbank.

The relationship between Vera von Hoff and her daughter Marion remains strained for a while thereafter. Prusso, meanwhile, has received such critical acclaim that he is asked to join the national team and be trained at the equestrian training center in Eberslohe. Marion reluctantly acquiesces to the offer and takes Russo to be introduced to his new trainer Günther Legler. Legler is far too hard in his handling of Prusso, and there are many tense exchanges between Marion and Legler as a result. Although Marion threatens multiple times to leave the center with Prusso, she is unable to make good on her threat because her mother, Prusso's legal owner, has signed an official Terms of Training document. Ultimately, Marion accepts the situation and an improvement eventually occurs in her relationship with the self-confident Legerer who was convinced from the beginning that he could “tame” Marion.

At the Riders’ Ball on the night before Legler and Prusso compete in the Prize of Nations Tournament in which Legler, Marion dances with Legler as her mother and Dr. Meining enter the ballroom. Marion is now overjoyed to see her mother again and forgives her for keeping her relationship with Dr. Meining a secret. The next morning as Prusso and Legler face the formidable Berndella ridden by Lieutenant Ortega, Marion sends her horse and her new love off with the Trakehner saying: “Show your courage, Trakehner-blood!” In a thrilling race, Prusso and Legler prevail in the international competition over Berndella und Ortega.

== Cast ==
- Brigitte Grothum as Marion von Hoff
- Winnie Markus as Vera von Hoff, Marion's mother
- Carl Raddatz as Peter Meining, veterinarian
- Dietmar Schönherr as Günther Legler
- Hermann Speelmans as Kalweit
- Gisela von Collande as Mrs. Buddensiek
- Stanislav Ledinek as Novak
- Franz-Otto Krüger as The Stranger
- Harry Hardt as Präsident des Reitturniers
- Eduard Linkers as Sawatzki, horse trader

== See also ==
- List of films about horses
