= And That on Monday Morning =

1959 film

- Film poster
- Directed by: Luigi Comencini
- Written by: Luigi Comencini; Peter Goldbaum; Franz Höllering
- Based on: Mr. Kettle and Mrs. Moon by J.B. Priestley
- Produced by: Artur Brauner; Wolf Brauner; Peter Goldbaum; Harry R. Sokal
- Starring: O. W. Fischer; Ulla Jacobsson; Vera Tschechowa
- Cinematography: Karl Löb
- Edited by: Walter Wischniewsky
- Music by: Hans-Martin Majewski
- Production companies: Sokal-Film; CCC Film
- Distributed by: Neue Filmverleih
- Release date: 26 June 1959
- Running time: 91 minutes
- Country: West Germany
- Language: German

And That on Monday Morning (German: Und das am Montagmorgen) is a 1959 West German comedy film directed by Luigi Comencini and starring O.W. Fischer, Ulla Jacobsson and Vera Tschechowa . Based on the 1955 British play Mr. Kettle and Mrs. Moon by J. B. Priestley, it was entered into the 9th Berlin International Film Festival. It was shot at the Spandau Studios in Berlin. The film's sets were designed by the art directors Helmut Nentwig and Ernst Schomer.

== Cast ==
- O. W. Fischer as Alois Kessel
- Ulla Jacobsson as Delia Mond
- Vera Tschechowa as Monika
- Robert Graf as Herbert Acker
- Werner Finck as Prof. Gross
- Reinhard Kolldehoff as Herr Müller
- Blandine Ebinger as Frau Präfke
- Lotte Stein as Frau Mutz
- Siegfried Schürenberg as Herr von Schmitz
- Manfred Grothe as Sekretär
- Inge Wolffberg as Patientin
- Elvira Schalcher as Sekretärin
- Kaete Alving as Frau Mond
- Sigurd Lohde as Dr. Mond
- Herbert Weissbach as Herr Wegeleben

== Bibliography ==
- Bock, Hans-Michael & Bergfelder, Tim. The Concise Cinegraph: Encyclopaedia of German Cinema. Berghahn Books, 2009.
