= Dies rigorose Leben =

1983 film

- Directed by: Vadim Glowna
- Written by: Vadim Glowna
- Produced by: Vadim Glowna
- Starring: Ángela Molina
- Cinematography: Martin Schäfer
- Edited by: Helga Borsche
- Release date: 10 March 1983
- Running time: 100 minutes
- Country: West Germany
- Language: German

Dies rigorose Leben is a 1983 West German drama film directed by Vadim Glowna. It was entered into the 33rd Berlin International Film Festival, where it won an Honourable Mention.

== Cast ==
- Ángela Molina as Rosa
- Jerzy Radziwilowicz as Joey
- Vera Tschechowa as Salka
- Viveca Lindfors as Ada
- Elfriede Kuzmany as Martha
- José Sierra as George Lone Tree
- Frederico Rodrigues as Johnny
- Dolores Davis as Lorraine
- Beth Gottlieb as Juicy Lucy
- Helen Pesante as Ruby
- Laura Acosta as Boobs
- Lee Garcia as Pearl
- Joseph Pickett as Fremder
- Mike Gaglio Sr. as Defense lawyer
