= The Young Sinner (1960 film) =

1960 film

- Directed by: Rudolf Jugert
- Written by: Peter Berneis; Maria von der Osten-Sacken
- Produced by: Hans Lehmann; Kurt Ulrich; Heinz Willeg
- Starring: Karin Baal; Vera Tschechowa; Rudolf Prack
- Cinematography: Ekkehard Kyrath; Werner M. Lenz
- Edited by: Aribert Geier
- Music by: Ernst Simon
- Production company: Kurt Ulrich Filmproduktion
- Distributed by: Europa-Filmverleih
- Release date: 28 October 1960
- Running time: 93 minutes
- Country: West Germany
- Language: German

The Young Sinner (German: Die junge Sünderin) is a 1960 West German drama film directed by Rudolf Jugert and starring Karin Baal, Vera Tschechowa and Rudolf Prack. It was shot at the Göttingen Studios. The film's sets were designed by the art directors Otto Pischinger and Hertha Hareiter.

== Cast ==
- Karin Baal as Eva Reck
- Vera Tschechowa as Carola
- Rudolf Prack as Werner Ortmann
- Grethe Weiser as Anna Reck
- Inge Egger as Marthe Ortmann
- Rainer Brandt as Robert
- Lore Hartling as Isa Sensbach
- Peter Thom as Ludwig Reck
- Peter Vogel as Erich Kolp
- Ruth Nimbach as Fräulein Werth
- Bum Krüger as Hehedorn
- Hans Richter as Müller
- Albert Bessler as Scharwitz
- Hellmut Grube
- Rola Käsmann
- Georg Lehn
- Lore Schulz
- Barbara Wiechmann
- Alwin Woesthoff
- Paul Hubschmid as Alfred Schott

== Bibliography ==
- Hake, Sabine. German National Cinema. Routledge, 2013.
