= Immenhof (TV series) =

- Starring: Anneliese Uhlig; Claudia Rieschel; Erich Hallhuber
- Country of origin: Germany
- No. of seasons: 2
- No. of episodes: 20

Original release
- Release: January 1994 – August 1995

Immenhof (Someone's Garden) is a German television series. The series featured a "pony ranch" from the Immenhof film series based on the novels by Ursula Bruns (born 1922).

== Casts ==
- Anneliese Uhlig: Frederike Gräfin von Bantz
- Claudia Rieschel: Hanna Christiansen
- Erich Hallhuber: Stefan Christiansen
- Heinz Weiss: Peter „PS“ Stahl
- Nina Lorck-Schierning: Kerstin
- Werner Dissel: Wilhelm
- Iska Geri: Lisbeth
- Eva Habermann: Melanie
- Fabian Harloff: Karl-Heinz „Charly“ Vogler
- Hendrik Fitschen: „Timmi“

== See also ==
- Immenhof films
