= Vera Tschechowa =

German actress (1940–2024)

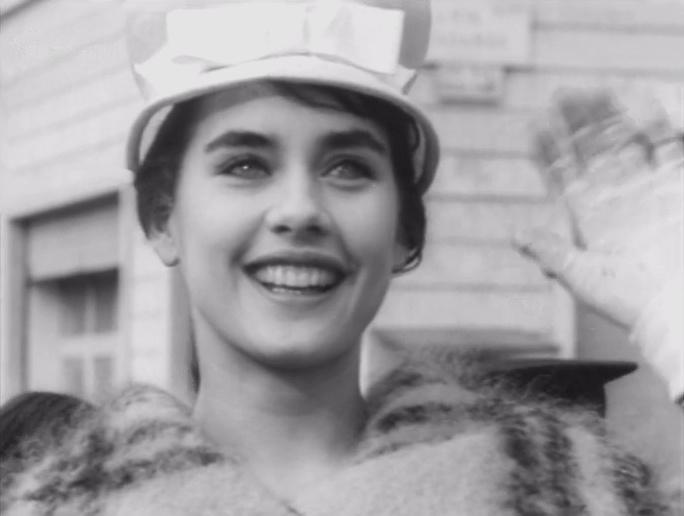
- Tschechowa in Angel in a Taxi (1958)
- Born: 22 July 1940; Berlin, Germany
- Died: 3 April 2024 (aged 83); Berlin, Germany
- Occupations: Actress, producer, director, screenwriter
- Years active: 1957–2024
- Spouses: Hartmut Reck (divorced); Vadim Glowna (m. 1967; div. 1990): Peter Paschek
- Children: 1 (adopted)
- Parent(s): Ada Tschechowa; Wilhelm Rust
- Relatives: Olga Chekhova (grandmother); Michael Chekhov (grandfather); Alexander Chekhov (great-grandfather); Lev Knipper (great-uncle); Anton Chekhov (great-great uncle); Olga Knipper (great-great aunt); Marina Ried (first cousin once removed)

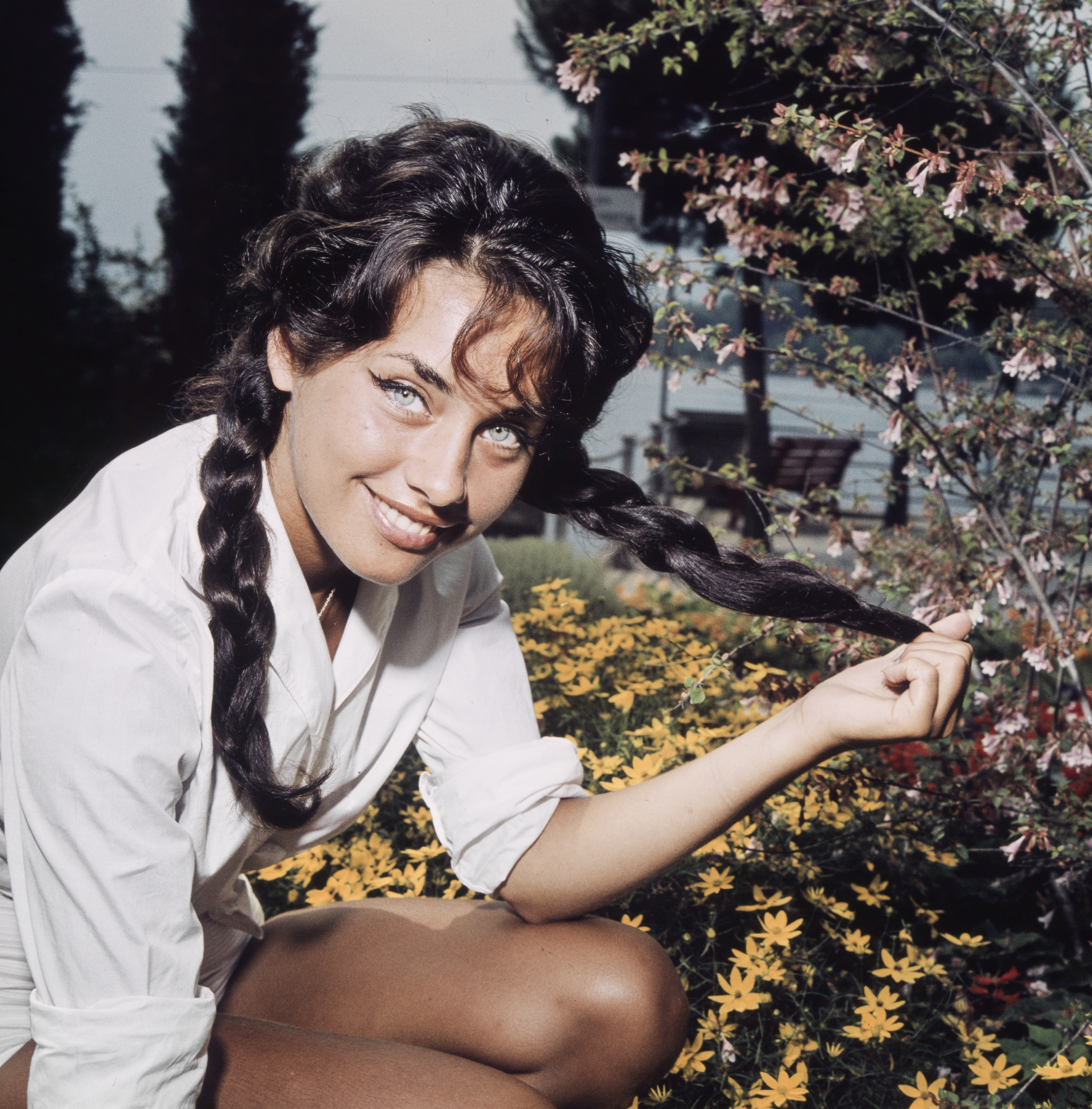
Vera Tschechowa (1959)

Vera Rust (22 July 1940 – 3 April 2024), known as Vera Tschechowa, was a German producer, director, screenwriter, and actress of Russian descent. She appeared in more than 50 films between 1957 and 1996. She was widely known as Elvis Presley's companion, particularly in connection with his Oral Poliomyelitis Vaccine (OPV) public booster-advocacy and which they both undertook during Presley's first year in Germany with the U.S. Army (1959).

Her mother, Ada Tschechowa, was the daughter of Michael Chekhov (nephew of the Russian playwright and short story writer, Anton Chekov) and Olga Chekhova. Vera's name appeared, on 6 June 1971, as one of 28 women under the banner "We've had abortions!" ("Wir haben abgetrieben!") on the cover page of the West German magazine Stern. In that issue, 374 women publicly stated that they had had pregnancies terminated, which at that time was illegal.

Vera Tschechowa died in Berlin on 3 April 2024, at the age of 83.

== Selected filmography ==
- Widower with Five Daughters (1957)
- The Doctor of Stalingrad (1958), as Tamara
- Angel in a Taxi (1958), as Camilla
- The Muzzle (1958)
- The Girl with the Cat's Eyes (1958), as Katja
- My Ninety Nine Brides (1958)
- And That on Monday Morning (1959), as Monika
- Der Schleier fiel (1960), as Lisa Roth
- The Young Sinner (1960), as Carola
- The Bread of Those Early Years (1962), as Ulla Wickweber
- Love at Twenty (1962)
- The Curse of the Hidden Vault (1964), as Feder-Lissy
- Call Girls of Frankfurt (1966), as Vera Paterny
- Liebe und so weiter (1968), as Nina Michel
- Som hon bäddar får han ligga (1970), as Kristina
- The First Circle (1973), as Clara
- Cold Blood (1975), as Corinna
- Euridice BA 2037 (1975), as Eurydice
- Erika's Passions (1976, TV film), as Franziska
- The Rider on the White Horse (1978), as Vollina Harders
- Panic Time (1980), as Frau Dr. Wunder
- Desperado City (1981), as Hilke
- The Confessions of Felix Krull (1982, TV miniseries), as Maria Pia
- Dies rigorose Leben (1983), as Salka
- Thousand Eyes (1984), as Victoria
- Bluebeard (1984, TV film), as Gisela
- Tarot (1986), as Charlotte
- Ein Heim für Tiere (1987–1991, TV series, 19 episodes), as Dr. Julia Gessner
- The Post Office Girl (1988, TV film), as Clara van Boolen
- Frei zum Abschuss (1989, TV film), as Marthe Ruben
- Love at First Sight (1991), as Elsa's Mother
