= Captain Sindbad =

1963 film by Byron Haskin

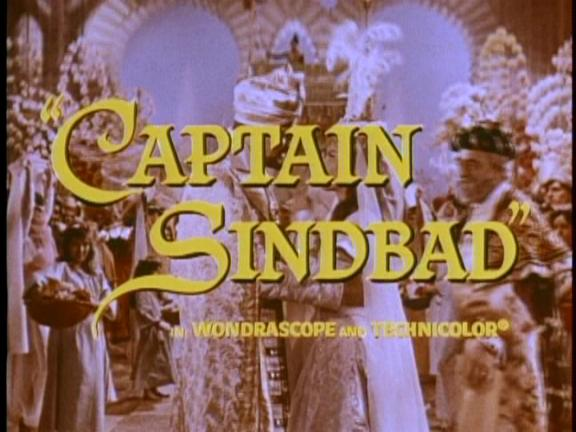
- Theatrical release main title frame
- Directed by: Byron Haskin
- Written by: Samuel B. West; Harry Relis
- Produced by: Frank King; Herman King
- Starring: Guy Williams; Heidi Brühl; Pedro Armendáriz; Abraham Sofaer
- Cinematography: Günther Senftleben; Eugen Schüfftan
- Edited by: Robert Swink
- Music by: Michel Michelet
- Production company: King Brothers Productions
- Distributed by: Metro-Goldwyn-Mayer
- Release date: June 19, 1963
- Running time: 85 minutes
- Countries: United States; West Germany
- Language: English
- Box office: $2,500,000 (US/ Canada)

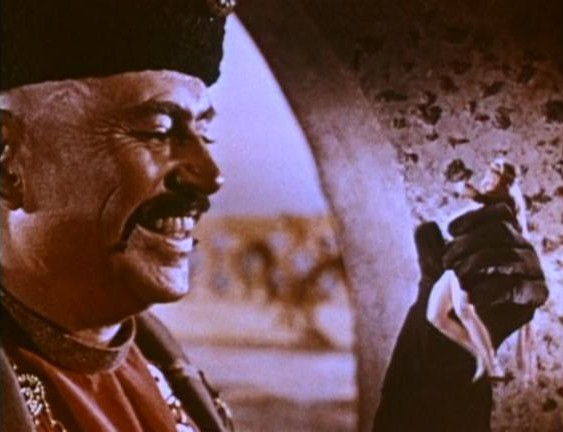
El Kerim uses magic for evil: pleasure, self-protection, and self-aggrandizement

Captain Sindbad is a 1963 American-West-German fantasy film, produced by Frank King and Herman King, directed by Byron Haskin, that stars Guy Williams and Heidi Brühl. The film was shot at the Bavaria Film studios in Germany and was distributed by Metro-Goldwyn-Mayer.

The screenplay was rewritten by Guy Endore, then rewritten again by co-producer Frank King a week before filming began in order to reduce production expenses; the film was reedited again prior to release. Haskin also shot some of the film's special effects sequences for an MGM Television television pilot, but no network picked it up.

== Plot ==
The peaceful kingdom of Baristan is ruled by the evil El Kerim. He plans to capture his rival, Sindbad, who will soon return from a voyage to marry Princess Jana. The Princess convinces the magician Galgo to turn her into a Firebird, so that she may fly off to warn Sindbad of the trap set for him. She is able to do so, just as Galgo is discovered by the guards, who take him to El Kerim. As Sindbad and his crew sail towards Baristan, the Princess/Firebird lands aboard their ship.

Before she can deliver the message, however, El Kerim has his guards transformed into giant human falcons, which manage to sink Sindbad's ship using large rocks. Sindbad and some of his crew survive the attack and carefully make their way ashore. Galgo stretches out his arm over a long distance in order to steal El Kerim's magic ring. El Kerim, however, wakes up in time and burns Galgo's hand using a nearby oil lamp.

Sindbad, posing as a petty thief so he can arrested, is taken before the evil ruler as planned. El Kerim is not fooled by the pretense and orders him to be executed. Sindbad breaks free and stabs him directly in the heart with a sword, but El Kerim cannot be killed, protected by one of Galgo's magic spells. He orders Sindbad be put to death in the public arena the next day.

Sindbad must now do battle with a giant invisible creature. Fortunately, it knocks over two large braizzers in its pursuit, starting a large fire. This incites a mass exodus of the arena's large crowd, allowing Sindbad to escape during the confusion that follows.

Sindbad goes to Galgo and finally convinces the magician to reveal El Kerim's secret: The evil ruler had his vulnerable heart removed, and it is now kept safe in a distant tower, guarded by supernatural forces. In the meantime, El Kerim insists that the Princess marry him, but when she finally refuses, he orders her to be executed at dawn. Sindbad and his men must traverse a swamp of horror in order to reach the tower containing the evil heart. They encounter carnivorous hanging vines, gigantic crocodiles, fiery volcanic lava pits, and boiling whirlpools. With their numbers reduced, they finally arrive at the tower, where they face a huge dragon-like creature with nine heads which they dispatch with a giant rock in order to enter.

Sindbad, with the aid of a hook, begins climbing the tower's immense rope, which rings a huge warning gong, alerting El Kerim. When he reaches the top, Sindbad discovers the still beating heart is encased in crystal. It is protected by a giant gloved hand, which pursues Sindbad around the chamber, until he throws the hook at the crystal, dislodging the heart. This causes El Kerim to suffer a heart attack. Seeking to protect his vulnerable heart, El Kerim rapidly flies to the tower with Galgo in a winged chariot. Just as Sindbad is about to impale the evil heart, El Kerim arrives. A fierce sword duel between them begins. Galgo tosses the heart over the side of the tower and it explodes upon hitting the ground. El Kerim stumbles and dies, and his body falls over the tall tower's edge.

Later, amid much pomp and circumstance, the entire kingdom celebrates the marriage of Captain Sindbad and Princess Jana.

== Cast ==
- Guy Williams as Captain Sindbad
- Heidi Brühl as Princess Jana
- Pedro Armendáriz as El Kerim
- Abraham Sofaer as Galgo
- Bernie Hamilton as Quinius
- Helmuth Schneider as Bendar
- Margaret Jahnen as Lady-in-Waiting
- Rolf Wanka as The King
- Walter Barnes as Rolf
- James Dobson as Iffritch
- Maurice Marsac as Ahmed
- Henry Brandon as Colonel Kabar
- John Crawford as Aram
- Geoffrey Toone as Mohar
- Lawrence Montaigne as Jafar

== Production ==
The film was shot at the Bavaria Studios in Munich with sets designed by the art directors Isabella Schlichting and Werner Schlichting. Outtakes of the film's "Dragon-Ogre" were used briefly in the film Natural Born Killers. The film was released just one day after Pedro Armendáriz died by suicide.

== Reception ==
New York Times review, July 4, 1963

Until about the last 20 minutes, it's strictly a broad mishmash of fantasy-comedy, spilling out over some lavishly gaudy sets of Old Arabia. As for plot, there's sinewy Sindbad (Guy Williams) trying to rescue a dead pan princess (Heidi Bruhl) from a wicked ruler (Pedro Armendariz), aided by a tippling, belching old magician. Throw in a tired "Scheherazade"-type of score, as Mr. Williams braves anything from crocodiles to a 12-headed monster (our count, anyway), and you have the kind of harmless trash some kids may tolerate. Yesterday, a cute little blonde in front of us took it all in stride, monsters included. She also perked up, leaning forward, for that final reel, when the picture slips from mediocrity into a wildly funny, eerie and casually beguiling adventure, not hard to take. One set, a garishly tangled swamp, is nifty; so is the final one, for a palace skirmish. The King Brothers produced it, in Munich, of all places. M.G.M. sponsors.

== Comic book adaptation ==
- Gold Key: Captain Sindbad (September 1963)
