= Olga Chekhova =

Russian-German actress (1897–1980)

- Ольга Чехова
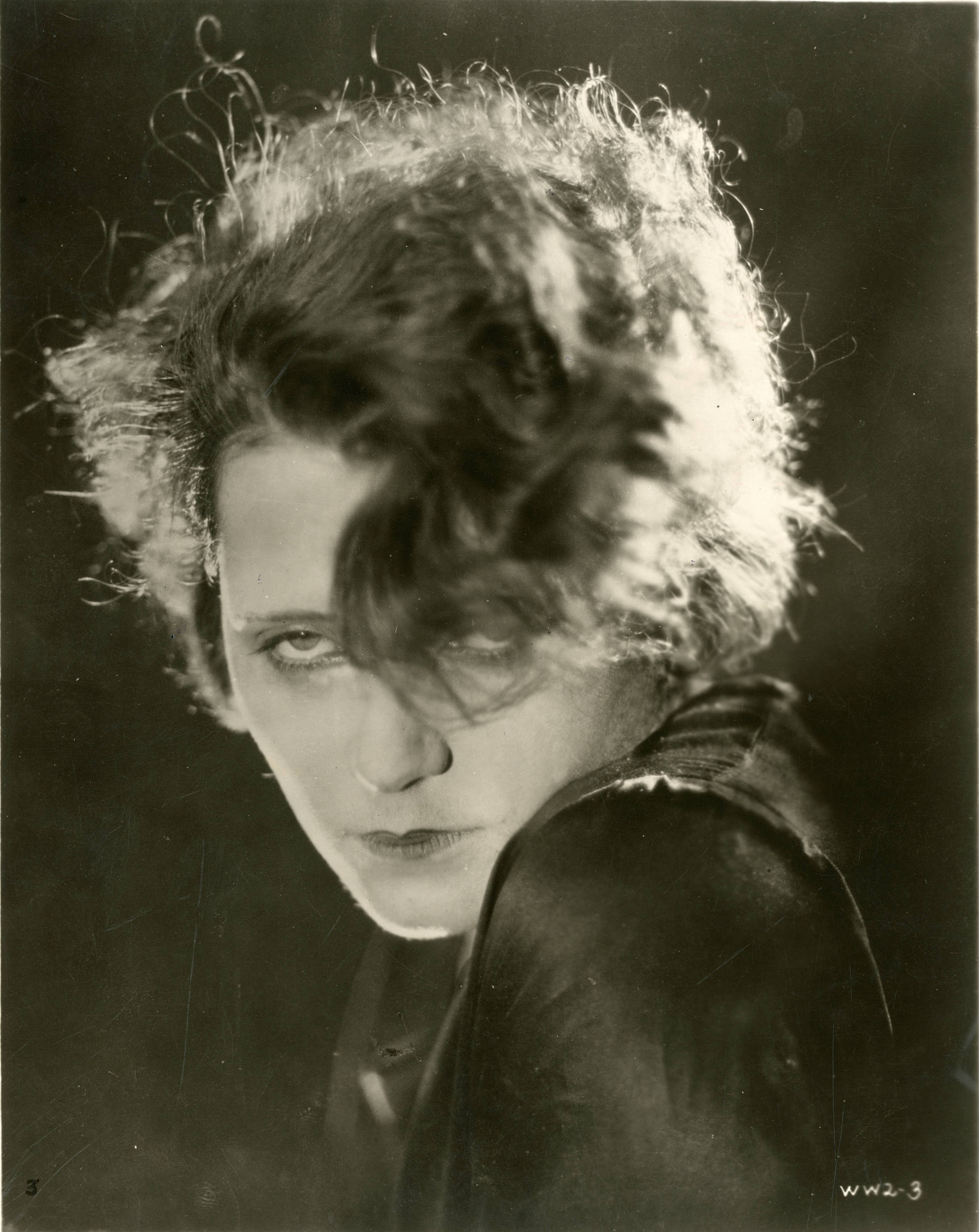
- Chekhova c. 1929
- Born: Olga Konstantinovna Knipper; 14 April 1897; Aleksandropol, Erivan Governorate, Russian Empire (today Gyumri, Armenia)
- Died: 9 March 1980 (aged 82); Munich, West Germany
- Other name: Olga Tschechowa
- Occupation: Actress
- Years active: 1926–1974
- Spouses: Michael Chekhov (m. 1914; div. 1917) Frederick Yaroshi (m. 1920; div. 1921) Marcel Robbins (m. 1936; div. 1938)
- Children: Ada Tschechowa
- Relatives: Lev Knipper (brother); Olga Knipper (aunt); Anton Chekhov (uncle); Marina Ried (niece); Vera Tschechowa (granddaughter)

Olga Konstantinovna Chekhova (née Knipper; Russian: Ольга Константиновна Чехова; 14 April 1897 – 9 March 1980), known in Germany as Olga Tschechowa, was a Russian-German actress. Her film roles include the female lead in Alfred Hitchcock's Mary (1931).

== Biography ==
Olga was the niece and namesake of Olga Knipper (Anton Chekhov's wife). She went to school in Tsarskoye Selo but, after watching Eleonora Duse, joined the Moscow Art Theatre's studio. There she met the Russian-Jewish actor Mikhail Chekhov (Anton's nephew) in 1914 and married him the same year, taking his surname as her own. Their daughter, also named Olga, was born in 1916. She became an actress under the name of Ada Tschechowa.

During the year of the 1917 October Revolution, Chekhova divorced her husband but kept his name. In the first year of the revolution, she joined a cabaret-theatre group called Sorokonozhka (The Little Centipede), as the troupe consisted of twenty members and forty feet. Chekhova also was given a part in a silent movie, Anya Kraeva, in 1917. In 1918, she was given roles in Cagliostro and in The Last Adventure of Arsène Lupin. Although part of the social circle around the Moscow Art Theatre, she never played a role there, despite her later claims to having her first theatre role in The Cherry Orchard.

She managed to get a travel passport from the Soviet government, possibly in exchange for her cooperation, which led to permission to leave Russia. She was accompanied by a Soviet agent on a train to Vienna, then she moved to Berlin in 1920. That same year, she married Frederick Yaroshi, though they divorced in 1921. Her first cinema role in Germany was in F. W. Murnau silent movie Schloß Vogelöd (1921). She played in Max Reinhardt's productions at UFA. She made the successful transition from silent film to talkies. In the 1930s, she rose to become one of the brightest stars of the Third Reich and was admired by Adolf Hitler. She appeared in such films as The Hymn of Leuthen although she preferred comedies. In 1936 she married for the third time, to Marcel Robbins, which ended in divorce in 1938.

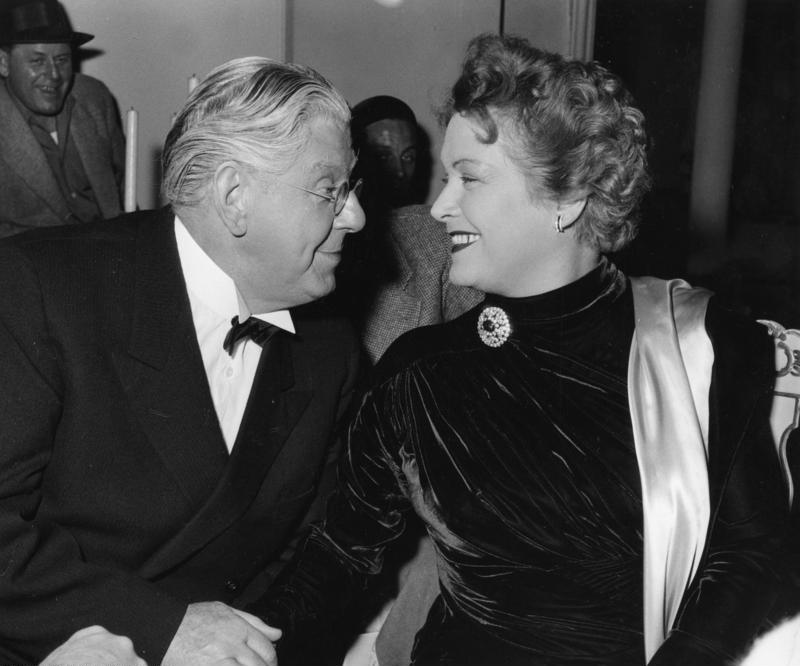
Chekhova at the Göttinger film festival in October 1953, sitting with Walter Janssen.

== Joseph Goebbels ==
A published photograph of her sitting beside Hitler at a reception gave the leaders of the Soviet intelligence service the impression that she had close contacts with Hitler. She had more contact with the Minister of Propaganda, Joseph Goebbels, who referred to her in his diaries as "eine charmante Frau" ("a charming lady").

She is also rumored to have been a communist spy in a Soviet conspiracy. According to the book Killing Hitler (2006) by the British author Roger Moorhouse, she was pressured by Stalin and Beria to flirt with Adolf Hitler in order to gain and transfer information so that Hitler could be killed by secret Soviet agents.

== Later years ==
Olga achieved great success in the motion picture industry. Her filmography includes 138 credits as an actor, director, and producer between 1917 and 1974. After the war she lived in the Soviet sector of Berlin, but eventually she managed to escape from her Soviet contacts. In 1949, she moved to Munich, Bavaria, and launched a cosmetics company, Olga Tschechowa Kosmetik.

At the same time she continued acting, and played supporting roles and cameos in more than 20 films. She largely retired from acting in the 70s, after publishing a book of memoirs. Her correspondence with Russian actresses Olga Knipper and Alla Tarasova was published posthumously.

Her niece Marina Ried and granddaughter Vera Tschechowa also became actresses.

== Selected filmography ==
- Anya Kraeva (1917) as Unknown role
- Poslednie priklucheniya Arsena Lupena (1918) as Unknown role
- Kaliostro (1918) as Unknown role
- The Haunted Castle (1921) as Baronin Safferstätt
- Impostor (1921) as Unknown role
- Violet (1921) as Violet
- The Circle of Death (1922) as Olga Petrowna
- Der Kampf ums Ich (1922) as Unknown role
- Nora (1923) as Nora
- The Journey to Happiness (1923) as Alice Holmes
- The Pagoda (1923) as Unknown role
- Certificates of Death (1923) as Unknown role
- Tatjana (1923) as Tatjana
- The Lost Shoe (1923) as Estella
- Debit and Credit (1924) as Sabine
- The Enchantress (1924) as Unknown role
- The Venus of Montmartre (1925) as Gräfin Sullivan
- The City of Temptation (1925) as Unknown role
- The Old Ballroom (1925, part 1, 2) as Unknown role
- Should We Get Married? (1925) as Unknown role
- Love Story (1925) as Lilli, das Verhältnis
- The Company Worth Millions (1925) as Unknown role
- The Fallen (1926) as Malwa, Freundin von Hammer
- The Mill at Sanssouci (1926) as Tänzerin Barberina
- Malice (1926) as Seine Frau
- The Schimeck Family (1926) as Olga, seine Frau
- Trude (1926) as Unknown role
- The Man in the Fire (1926) as Diva Romola
- His Toughest Case (1926) as Mary Melton
- Grandstand for General Staff (1926) as Gräfin Landieren
- Aftermath (1927) as Nadja
- The Sea (1927) as Rosseherre
- His Late Excellency (1927) as Baronin von Windegg
- The Italian Straw Hat (1928) as Anaïs de Beauperthuis
- Moulin Rouge (1928) as Parysia
- Pawns of Passion (1928) as Ala Suminska
- Woman in Flames (1928) as Gräfin Clarissa Thalberg
- After the Verdict (1929) as Vivian Denys
- Diane (1929) as Diane Mervil
- The Love of the Brothers Rott (1929) as Theresa Donath
- Foolishness of His Love (1929) as Director
- Incest (1929) as Lisbeth Kröger - deren Tochter aus erster Ehe
- Helene Willfüer, Student of Chemistry (1930) as Helene Willfüer
- Love in the Ring (1930) as Lilian
- Troika (1930) as Vera Walowa
- Der Detektiv des Kaisers (1930) as Olga
- The Three from the Filling Station (1930) as Edith von Turoff
- Darling of the Gods (1930) as Olga von Dagomirska
- Zwei Krawatten (1930) as Mabel
- The Road to Paradise (1930) as Edith de Tourkoff
- A Girl from the Reeperbahn (1930) as Hanne Bullová
- The Great Longing (1930) as Herself
- Liebe auf Befehl (1931) as Manuela
- Mary (1931) as Mary Baring
- Panic in Chicago (1931) as Florence Dingley
- The Night of Decision (1931) as Maria Iwanowa (Marya Sablin)
- The Concert (1931) as Maria Heink, Gattin
- Night Convoy (1932) as Inka Maria, seine Frau
- Trenck (1932) as Elisabeth, Zarin von Rußland
- Spies at the Savoy Hotel (1932) as Miß Harris
- The Hymn of Leuthen (1933) as Gräfin Mariann
- Liebelei (1933) as Baronin v. Eggersdorff
- A Love Story (1933) as Baronin von Eggersdorf
- Ways to a Good Marriage (1933) as Claire Veiler, die unbefriedigte Frau
- Ein gewisser Herr Gran (1933) as Frau Mervin
- Un certain monsieur Grant (1933) as Mme Merwin - une espionne
- The Country Schoolmaster (1933) as Teresa van der Straaten
- Um ein bisschen Glück (1933) as Helene, seine Frau
- Police Report (1934) as Gisela Ostercamp
- Between Two Hearts (1934) as Inge Leuthoff
- L'amour qu'il faut aux femmes (1934) as Le troisième couple
- The World Without a Mask (1934) as Betty Bandelow
- Maskerade (1934) as Anita Keller - seine Braut
- What Am I Without You (1934) as Lilly Petrowa, Schauspielerin
- Abenteuer eines jungen Herrn in Polen (1934) as Gräfin Lubenska
- Peer Gynt (1934) as Baronin
- Regine (1935) as Floris Bell, Schauspielerin
- Asew (1935) as Tanja Asew, seine Frau
- The Eternal Mask (1935) as Madame Negar
- Dreams of Love (1935) as Gräfin Madeleine Duday
- Artist Love (1935) as Olivia Vanderhagen
- Ein Walzer um den Stephansturm (1935) as Sylvia von Polonska
- The Empress's Favourite (1936) as Elisabeth Kaiserin von Russland
- L'argent (1936) as Baronne Sandorff
- Manja Valewska (1936) as Gräfin Pola Valewska
- His Daughter is Called Peter (1936) as Nora Noir
- Hannerl and Her Lovers (1936) as Frau von Stahl
- Court Theatre (1936) as Baroness Seebach
- Die weissen Teufel (1936) as Jenny Morel
- The Ways of Love Are Strange (1937) as Antonia Delvarez
- Unter Ausschluß der Öffentlichkeit (1937) as Brigitte Sparrenberg
- The Yellow Flag (1937) - Helen Roeder as amerikanische Journalistin
- Gewitterflug zu Claudia (1937) as Frau Mainburg
- The Girl with a Good Reputation (1938) as Mirandolina
- Red Orchids (1938) as Maria Dorando
- Two Women (1938) as Paula Corvey
- Adventure in Love (1938) as Olivia
- The Stars Shine (1938) as Herself
- Bel Ami (1939) as Madeleine Forestier
- Ich verweigere die Aussage (1939) as Nora Ottendorf
- Parkstraße 13 (1939) as Evelyne Schratt
- Die unheimlichen Wünsche (1939) as Feodora, Schauspielerin
- Liberated Hands (1939) as Kerstin Thomas
- Passion (1940) as Gerda
- Angelika (1940) as Angelika
- The Fox of Glenarvon (1940) as Gloria Grandison
- People in the Storm (1941) as Vera seine Frau
- Andreas Schlüter (1942) as Gräfin Vera Orlewska
- With the Eyes of a Woman (1942) as Marie-Louise v. Ditmar, Baronin von Stein
- The Eternal Tone (1943) as Josephine Malti, Singer
- Journey into the Past (1943) as Marianne von der Halden
- Gefährlicher Frühling (1943) as Juliane von Buckwitz
- Melusine (1944) as Nora
- In the Temple of Venus (1948) as Carola Weber
- One Night Apart (1950) as Vera, seine Frau
- Kein Engel ist so rein (1950) as Margot
- Two in One Suit (1950) as Catherine Turner
- The Reluctant Maharaja (1950) as Susanne de Bogne - Journalistin
- Trouble in Paradise (1950) as Myriam Esneh
- The Man Who Wanted to Live Twice (1950) as Irene Hesse
- Desire (1951) as Frau des Bankpräsidenten
- Eine Frau mit Herz (1951) as Vera von Wesener
- The Secret of a Marriage (1951) as Tina Camphausen
- My Friend the Thief (1951) as Percys Schwester
- Behind Monastery Walls (1952) as Priorin
- Everything for Father (1953) as Frau von Pleskow
- Rose-Girl Resli (1953) as Mrs. von Weidersheim
- Heute nacht passiert's (1953) as Herself - Gast im Modesalon
- Captain Wronski (1954) as Frau von Eichhoff
- I Was an Ugly Girl (1955) as Luise Raymond
- The Barrings (1955) as Amelie von Eyff
- U 47 – Kapitänleutnant Prien (1958) as Die Fürstin
- Jack and Jenny (1963) as Mutter Johannsen
- The Twins from Immenhof (1973) as Großmutter Arkens
- Spring in Immenhof (1974) as Großmutter (final film role)
