= Angel in a Taxi =

1958 film

- Directed by: Antonio Leonviola
- Starring: Gabriele Ferzetti; Vera Tschechowa
- Music by: Piero Piccioni
- Release date: 1958
- Country: Italy
- Language: Italian

Angel in a Taxi (Italian: Ballerina e Buon Dio) is a 1958 Italian film. It stars Gabriele Ferzetti and Vera Tschechowa.

== Cast ==
- Vera Tschechowa: Camilla, the dancer
- Carlo Angeletti: Marietto
- Vittorio De Sica: God
- Gabriele Ferzetti: Andrea
- Guido Lauri: the dance partner
- Roberto Risso: Filippo
- Pina Renzi: Nun
- Gisella Sofio: Celeste, the nun
- Mario Carotenuto: Stepfather
- Dori Dorika: Stepmother
- Amalia Pellegrini:the baker's mother
- Erminio Spalla:the saltimbanco
- Dolores Palumbo: Giuseppa
- Giacomo Furia: Bakery's owner
- Ferdinand Guillaume:the garbage collector
- Spartaco Bandini: the owner of the
- Giusi Raspani Dandolo: car accident lady
- Pina Gallini:mother rejected by Marietto
- Rita Rosa: the pastry shop order
- Furio Meniconi:a taxinar
- Mimmo Poli:spectator at the performance of the acrobats
