= Rising to the Bait =

1992 film

- Directed by: Vadim Glowna
- Written by: Knut Boeser; Christine Roesch
- Produced by: Harald Reichebner
- Starring: Elsa Grube-Deister
- Cinematography: Franz Ritschel
- Edited by: Karola Mittelstädt
- Release date: February 1992
- Running time: 103 minutes
- Country: Germany
- Language: German

Rising to the Bait (German: Der Brocken) is a 1992 German comedy film directed by Vadim Glowna. It was entered into the 42nd Berlin International Film Festival.

== Cast ==
- Elsa Grube-Deister as Ada Fenske
- Rolf Zacher as Zwirner
- Muriel Baumeister as Svetlana
- Ben Becker as Funke
- Günter Kornas as Solters
- Franz Viehmann as Fiedler
- Hans Jochen Röhrig as Pastor Seidel
- Roman Silberstein as Hein Geerke
- Werner Schwuchow as Braeske
- Bruno Dunst as Schreker
- Wolf-Dietrich Berg as Naujok
- Heinz Werner Kraehkamp as Raschke
- Ralf Sählbrandt as Benno
