= Captain Wronski =

1954 film

- Danish release poster
- Directed by: Ulrich Erfurth
- Written by: Axel Eggebrecht; Michael Graf Soltikow
- Produced by: Willie Hoffmann-Andersen
- Starring: Willy Birgel; Elisabeth Flickenschildt; Antje Weisgerber; Ilse Steppat
- Cinematography: Igor Oberberg
- Edited by: Hermann Ludwig
- Music by: Norbert Schultze
- Production companies: Apollo-Film; Deutsche London-Film
- Distributed by: Deutsche Film Hansa
- Release date: 11 October 1954
- Running time: 99 minutes
- Country: West Germany
- Language: German

Captain Wronski (German: Rittmeister Wronski) is a 1954 West German spy film directed by Ulrich Erfurth and starring Willy Birgel, Elisabeth Flickenschildt, and Antje Weisgerber. A Polish officer works undercover in 1930s Berlin to discover Nazi Germany's plans against his homeland.

The film is very loosely based on Michael Graf Soltikow's book about Jerzy Sosnowski. It was shot at the Tempelhof Studios in Berlin with sets designed by the art director Fritz Maurischat. The casting of Birgel in the title role referenced his best-known performance during the Nazi era when he had played another Rittmeister in Riding for Germany (1941).

== Cast ==
- Willy Birgel as Rittmeister Wronski
- Elisabeth Flickenschildt as Jadwiga, seine Schwester
- Antje Weisgerber as Illse von Jagstfeld
- Ilse Steppat as Leonore Cronberg
- Irene von Meyendorff as Liane von Templin
- Paul Hartmann as Oberst Ranke
- Claus Holm as Dornbusch
- Olga Chekhova as Frau von Eichhoff
- Axel Monjé as Major Momenbek
- Volker von Collande as Major Kegel
- Rudolf Forster as Oberst Maty
- Ernst Schroder as Stepan
- Marina Ried as Susi im RWM
- Ernst Stahl-Nachbaur as Ein deutscher Abwehrgeneral
- Rolf von Nauckhoff as SS-Unterführer
- Hilde Körber as Gefangenenaufseherin
- Margarete Schön as Gefängnisbeamtin
- Charles Regnier as Vorsitzender Volksgerichtshof
- Harald Holberg
- Alexa von Porembsky
- Paul Heidemann
- Erich Dunskus
- Hans Stiebner
- Ingrid Lutz
- Karl Ludwig Schreiber
- Walther Süssenguth

== Bibliography ==
- Hake, Sabine (2001). Popular Cinema of the Third Reich. Austin: University of Texas Press. ISBN 978-0-292-73458-6.
