= Katharina Brauren =

German actress (1910–1998)

- Born: 21 April 1910; Grabow, Mecklenburg-Schwerin, German Empire
- Died: 25 December 1998 (aged 88); Hamburg, Germany
- Occupation: Actress
- Years active: 1937–1997

Katharina Brauren (21 April 1910 – 25 December 1998) was a German actress. She appeared in more than 80 films and television shows between 1937 and 1997.

== Selected filmography ==
- Madame Bovary (1937)
- Third from the Right (1950)
- Abundance of Life (1950)
- Woe to Him Who Loves (1951)
- The Major and the Bulls (1955)
- Under the Thousand Lanterns (1952)
- Toxi (1952)
- The Twins from Immenhof (1973)
- Spring in Immenhof (1974)
- November Cats (1986)
- Ödipussi (1988)
