= With the Eyes of a Woman =

1942 film

- Directed by: Karl Georg Külb
- Written by: Zsolt Harsányi (novel); Karl Georg Külb; Thea von Harbou
- Produced by: Gustav Althoff; Karl Hofer
- Starring: Ada Tschechowa; Olga Chekhova; Gustav Fröhlich
- Cinematography: Paul Rischke
- Edited by: Herbert B. Fredersdorf
- Music by: Giuseppe Becce
- Production company: Aco-Film
- Distributed by: Mitteldeutsche Union-Tonfilm
- Release date: 30 October 1942
- Running time: 100 minutes
- Country: Germany
- Language: German

With the Eyes of a Woman (German: Mit den Augen einer Frau) is a 1942 German drama film directed by Karl Georg Külb and starring Ada Tschechowa, Olga Chekhova and Gustav Fröhlich.

The film's sets were designed by the art director Willy Schiller. It was shot at the Althoff Studios in Berlin.

== Main cast ==
- Ada Tschechowa as Marie-Luise von Ditmar - 18 Jahre
- Olga Chekhova as Marie-Louise von Ditmar, Baronin von Stein
- Gustav Fröhlich as Paul von Detky
- Karl Martell as Rolf von Schenk
- Franz Schafheitlin as Baron von Stein
- Fritz Wagner as Jan Collander
- Marina von Ditmar as Clari
- Erika von Thellmann as Frau von Ditmar
- Hilde von Stolz as Cora Solani
- Maly Delschaft as Frau von Purkhammer
- Paul Bildt as Gutsbesitzer von Ditmar
- Elga Brink as Frau von Schenk
- Olga Limburg as Baronin von Jeschkow
- Rudolf Schündler as Werner
- Julia Serda as Tante Clarissa
- Klaus Pohl as Theaterinspizient

== Bibliography ==
- Bock, Hans-Michael & Bergfelder, Tim. The Concise Cinegraph: Encyclopaedia of German Cinema. Berghahn Books, 2009.
