= Heidi Brühl =

German singer and actress (1942–1991)

Background information
- Born: Heidi Rosemarie Brühl; 30 January 1942; Gräfelfing, Upper Bavaria, Germany
- Died: 8 June 1991 (aged 49) Starnberg, Germany
- Genre: Pop
- Occupations: Singer; Actress
- Years active: 1954-1991
- Spouse: Brett Halsey (m. 1964; div. 1976)

Heidi Rosemarie Brühl (German: [ˈhaɪdiː ˈbʁyːl]; 30 January 1942 – 8 June 1991) was a German singer and actress who came to prominence as a young teenager and had a prolific career in film and television. She was also a successful recording artist, and is known for her participation in the Eurovision Song Contest 1963.

== Early career ==
Brühl's first screen appearance was in the 1954 film Der letzte Sommer with Liselotte Pulver, but in the role of Dalli, in what became known as the "Immenhof films", she became famous in Germany. The Immenhof Girls, adapted from a novel by children's writer Ursula Bruns, appeared in 1955 and was followed by two sequels, Hochzeit auf Immenhof and Ferien auf Immenhof, at yearly intervals. She returned to the role in two more films in 1973 and 1974.

In 1959, Brühl obtained a record deal with the Philips label. At first she formed a duo the Dolly Sisters with Carina Korten. Her first solo single "Chico Chico Charlie" reached number five. In 1960, her recording of "Wir wollen niemals auseinandergehn" or "We Will Never Part (Ring of Gold)" sold over one million copies and was awarded a gold disc.

== Eurovision Song Contest ==
Brühl first took part in the German Eurovision selection in 1960 with Michael Jary's "Wir wollen niemals auseinandergehn" ("We Never Want to Be Apart"), which finished in second place but went on to top the German singles chart for nine weeks. She participated again in 1963, and this time was successful when "Marcel" was chosen to go forward to the Eurovision Song Contest 1963 which took place on 23 March in London. "Marcel" finished the evening in ninth place of 16 entries.

== Later acting career ==
Brühl co-starred with Guy Williams in the 1963 film Captain Sindbad. She met American actor Brett Halsey and moved with him to Rome, where they married in December 1964. In 1970, she moved to the United States where she appeared in Las Vegas and in episodes of such television series as Columbo "The Most Dangerous Match" (1973; Peter Falk, Laurence Harvey, Jack Kruschen). She returned to Germany to play in two further Immenhof sequels in 1973–1974, The Twins from Immenhof and Spring in Immenhof. She appeared in The Eiger Sanction in 1975 as Anna Montaigne, the seductive wife of a French climber, with Clint Eastwood and George Kennedy.

Brühl and Halsey divorced in 1976 and she returned to live in Germany the following year. She did dubbing work on films such as The NeverEnding Story and Look Who's Talking Too. Her last roles were in television serials such as Ein Fall für zwei and Praxis Bülowbogen.

== Death ==
Brühl died of breast cancer on 8 June 1991 in Starnberg, aged 49.

== Selected filmography ==
- The Country Schoolmaster (1954), as Sternchen
- The Last Summer (1954), as Jessika's sister
- The Immenhof Girls (1955), as Dalli Voss
- Hochzeit auf Immenhof (1956), as Dalli Voss
- Confessions of Felix Krull (1957), as Eleanor
- Precocious Youth (1957), as Inge
- Ferien auf Immenhof (1957), as Dalli Voss
- Ooh... diese Ferien (1958), as Monika Petermann
- Crime After School (1959), as Ulla Anders
- The Shepherd from Trutzberg (1959), as Hilda von Puechstein
- Two Times Adam, One Time Eve (1959), as Kaarina
- Freddy and the Melody of the Night (1960), as Inge
- The Hero of My Dreams (1960), as Marianne Kleinschmidt
- I Will Always Be Yours (1960), as Marianne Seibold
- One Prettier Than the Other (1961), as Gaby Fabian
- The Gypsy Baron (1962), as Arsena Zsupan
- Captain Sindbad (1963), as Princess Jana
- Columbo: The Most Dangerous Match (1973, TV), as Linda Robinson
- The Twins from Immenhof (1973), as Dalli Voss
- How to Seduce a Woman (1974), as Doctor Winifred Sisters
- Spring in Immenhof (1974), as Dalli Voss
- The Eiger Sanction (1975), as Anna Montaigne
- Das Gesetz des Clans (1977), as Anne Coronado

Preceded by Connie Froboess with Zwei kleine Italiener	Germany in the Eurovision Song Contest; 1963	Succeeded by Nora Nova with Man gewöhnt sich so schnell an das Schöne
