= Michael Chekhov =

Russian actor and director (1891–1955)

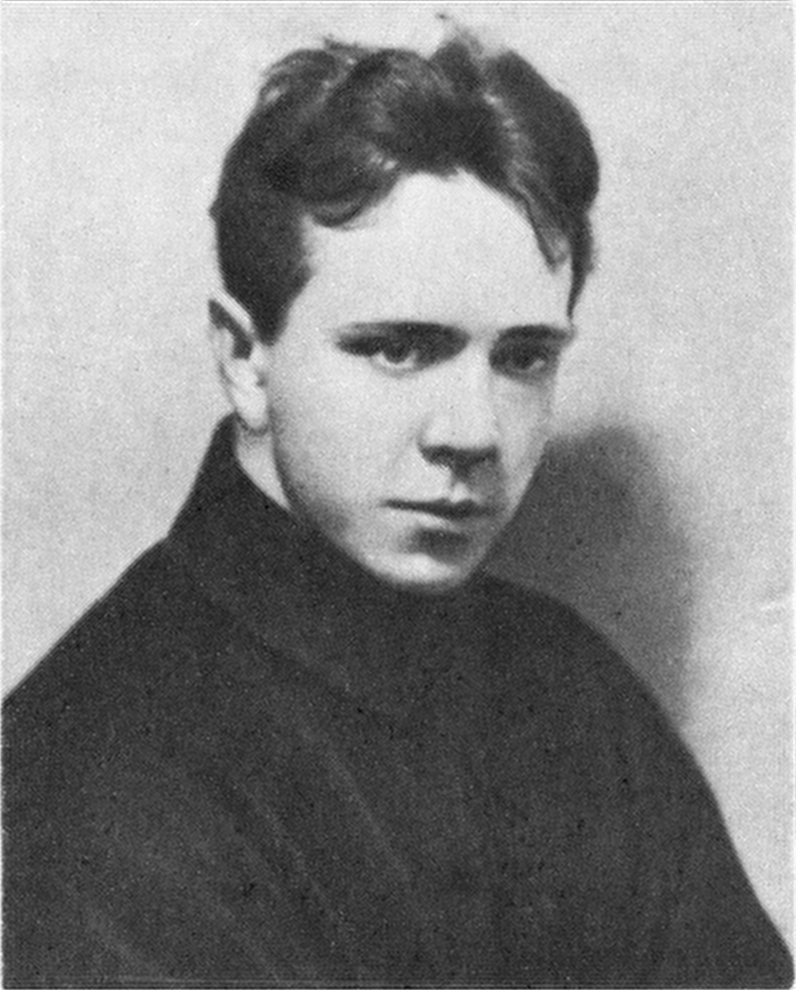
- Chekhov in the 1910s
- Born: Mikhail Aleksandrovich Chekhov; 16 August 1891; Saint Petersburg, Russia
- Died: 30 September 1955 (aged 64); Beverly Hills, California, U.S.
- Years active: 1913–1954
- Spouses: Olga Chekhova (m. 1914; div. 1917) Xenia Karlovna Ziller (m. 1918)
- Children: Ada Tschechowa
- Parents: Alexander Chekhov (father); Natalya Golden (mother)
- Relatives: Anton Chekhov (uncle); Olga Knipper (aunt); Vera Tschechowa (granddaughter)

Mikhail Aleksandrovich Chekhov (Russian: Михаил Александрович Чехов; 16 August 1891 – 30 September 1955), better known as Michael Chekhov, was a Russian-American actor, director, author, and theatre practitioner. He was a nephew of the playwright Anton Chekhov and a student of Konstantin Stanislavski. Stanislavski referred to him as his most brilliant student.

Although mainly a stage actor, he made a few notable appearances on film, perhaps most memorably as the Freudian analyst in Alfred Hitchcock's Spellbound (1945), for which he received his only Academy Award nomination.

== Life and career ==
=== Early years ===
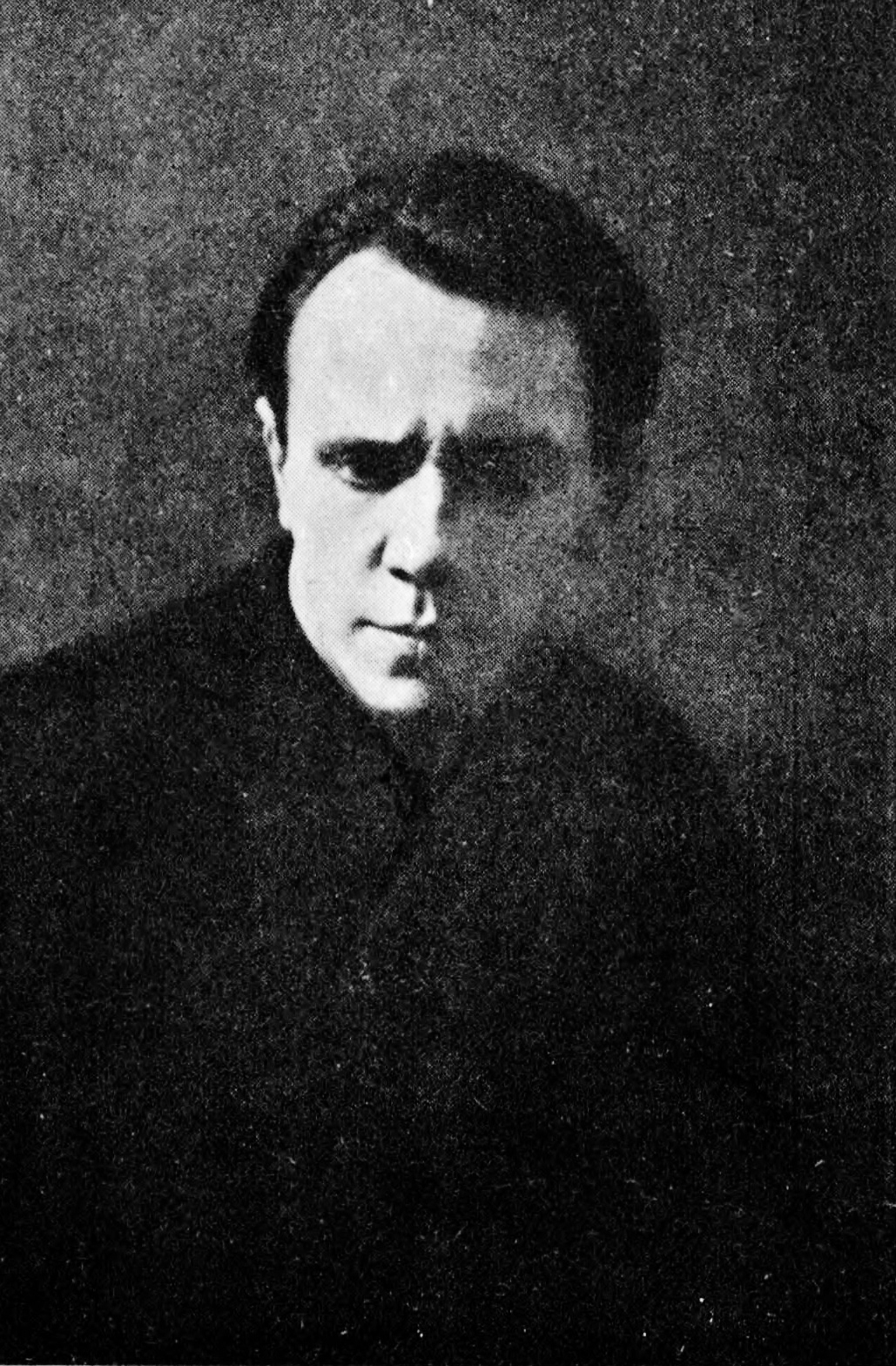
Chekhov in 1922

Mikhail Aleksandrovich Chekhov was born on 16 August 1891 in Saint Petersburg, the son of Alexander Chekhov (the elder brother of Anton Chekhov) and his wife Natalya Aleksandrovna Golden. It was his father's second marriage. His mother, a Russian Jew, had been the governess to the children from his father's first marriage. He was raised in a middle-class family; his father was in the Imperial Customs Service and was a moderately successful writer. In 1901, Michael began his secondary education, and from 1903, he began acting in amateur productions while staying at his family's cottage. He left school in 1910 to become a member of the Maly Theatre in Moscow.

Chekhov's first wife was actress Olga, whom he met at the First Studio of the Moscow Art Theatre. They secretly married on 3 September 1914. Olga Chekhova was a daughter of Konstantin Knipper and was the niece of Olga Knipper, Anton Chekhov's wife, after whom she was named. Their daughter, also baptized Olga, was born in 1916 and became a German actress under the name Ada Tschechowa. His second wife was Xenia Karlovna Ziller, of German origin; he married her on 3 June 1918.

In 1914, Chekhov visited his aunt Olga in Saint Petersburg and she recommended him to Konstantin Stanislavski. Under Stanislavski's First Studio, he acted, directed, and studied Stanislavski's 'system'. He was also influenced in his creative development as an actor by Yevgeny Vakhtangov and Leopold Sulerzhitsky. However, on 14 August 1915, Chekhov was called up for military duty. By May 1916, he was absolved of his military obligations. After suffering from depression, he returned to the First Studio in October 1918.

Stanislavski considered Chekhov to be one of his brightest students. When Chekhov experimented with affective memory and had a nervous breakdown, this aided Stanislavski in seeing the limitations of his early concepts of emotional memory.

After the October Revolution, Chekhov split with Stanislavski and toured with his own company. He thought that Stanislavski's techniques led too readily to a naturalistic style of performance. He demonstrated his own theories acting in parts such as Senator Ableukhov in the stage version of Andrei Bely's Petersburg. In 1922, after the death of Vakhtangov, Chekhov became director of the First Studio, which was subsequently renamed Moscow Art Theatre II.

With the beginning of Stalinism in 1927, Chekov came into conflict with the Communist regime and was threatened to be arrested, especially for his spiritualist interests. In the late 1920s, Chekhov emigrated to Germany and set up his own studio, teaching a physical and imagination-based system of actor training. He developed the use of the "Psychological Gesture", a concept derived from the Symbolist theories of Andrei Bely and influenced by the works of Rudolf Steiner. In this technique, the actor physicalizes a character's need or internal dynamic in the form of an external gesture. Subsequently, the outward gesture is suppressed and incorporated internally, allowing the physical memory to inform the performance on an unconscious level.

Chekhov worked in Riga from 1932 to 1934. During this time, he acted at the Riga Russian Theatre and founded an acting academy to teach his system to local Latvian and Lithuanian actors. Some of the notable roles he prepared there included Ivan the Terrible in "The Death of Ivan the Terrible" and Foma Opiskin in "Village of Stepanchikovo." In his honor, the theatre in Riga is now named the Mikhail Chekhov Riga Russian Theatre. Between 1930 and 1935, he also worked in Kaunas State Drama Theatre in Lithuania. Between 1936 and 1939, Chekhov established the Chekhov Theatre School at Dartington Hall, in Devon, England. Following developments in Germany that threatened the outbreak of war he moved to the US with the couple, and later writers, Anne Cumming and Henry Lyon Young to recreate a drama school.

=== Career ===
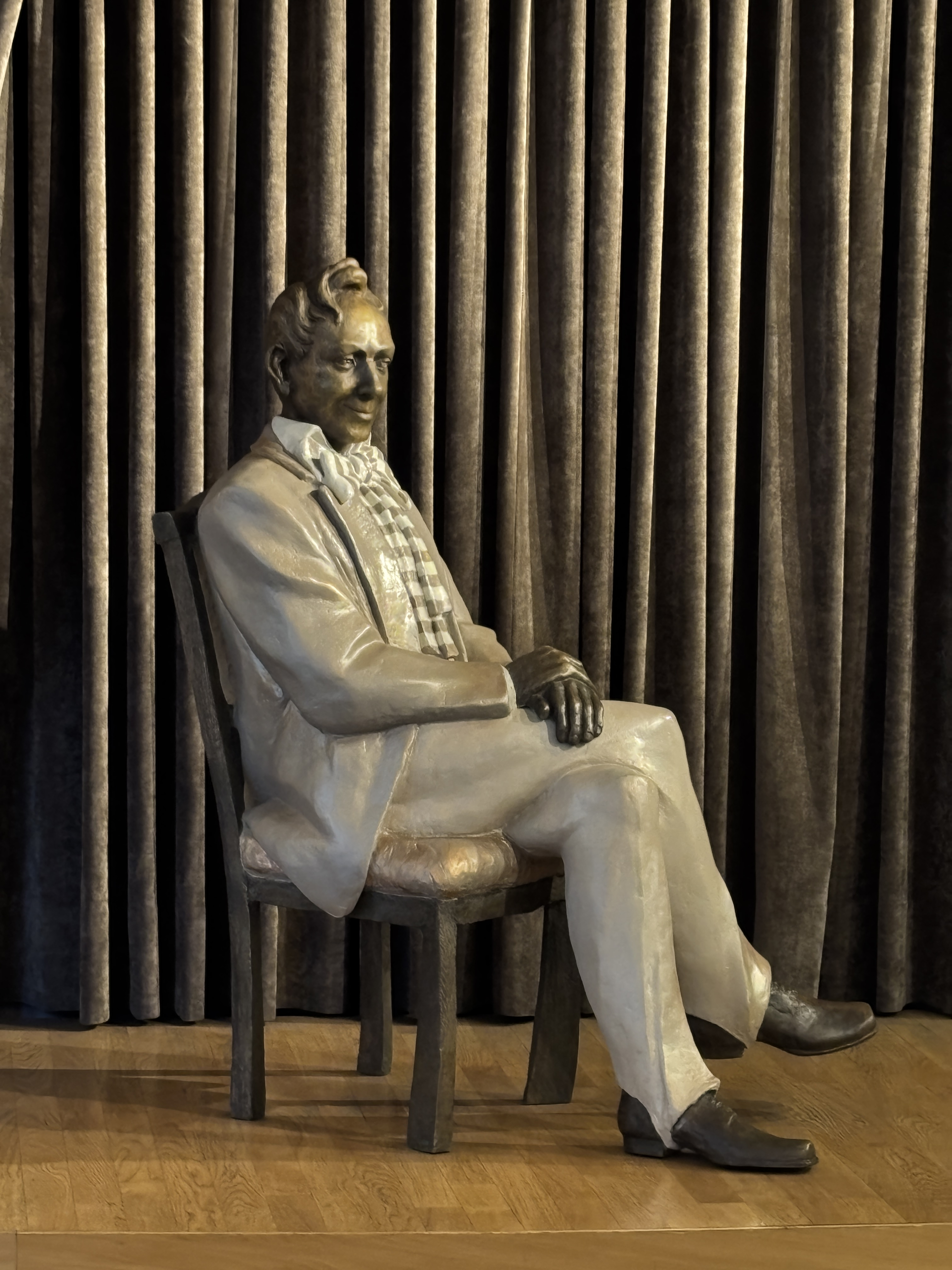
The sculpture of Michael Chekhov in the Michael Chekhov Riga Russian Theatre.

Following Stanislavski's approach, much of what Chekhov explored addressed the question of how to access the unconscious creative self through indirect non-analytical means. Chekhov taught a range of movement dynamics such as molding, floating, flying, and radiating that actors use to find the physical core of a character.

Despite his seemingly external approach, Chekhov's techniques were meant to lead the actor to a rich internal life. Interest in Chekhov's work has grown, however, with a new generation of teachers. Chekhov's own students included Marilyn Monroe, Anthony Quinn, Clint Eastwood, Dorothy Dandridge, Mala Powers, Yul Brynner, Patricia Neal, Sterling Hayden, Jack Palance, Elia Kazan, Robert Lewis, Paula Strasberg, Guy Gillette, and Lloyd and Dorothy Bridges. In the television programme Inside the Actors Studio, noted actors such as Johnny Depp and Anthony Hopkins have cited Chekhov's book as highly influential on their acting. Beatrice Straight also thanked Chekhov in her acceptance speech after winning her Oscar for her performance in Network (1976).

Chekhov's description of his acting technique, On the Technique of Acting, was written in 1942. When reissued in 1991 it had additional material by Chekhov estate executor Mala Powers; an abridged version appeared under the title To the Actor in 1953, with a preface by Yul Brynner, and reissued in 2002 with an additional foreword by Simon Callow and additional Russian material translated and commented on by Andrei Malaev-Babel, a notable Russian-born acting scholar and teacher. The English translation of his autobiography The Path of the Actor was edited by Andrei Kirillov and Bella Merlin and published by Routledge in 2005, marking the 50th anniversary of his death. Some of Chekhov's lectures are available on CD under the title On Theatre and the Art of Acting. The documentary From Russia to Hollywood: the 100 Year Odyssey of Chekhov and Shdanoff, profiles Chekhov and his fellow Russian associate George Shdanoff; released in 1998, it is narrated by Mala Powers and Gregory Peck, who starred in Alfred Hitchcock's Spellbound, for which Chekhov earned an Oscar nomination.

== Performances and works ==
=== Selected filmography ===
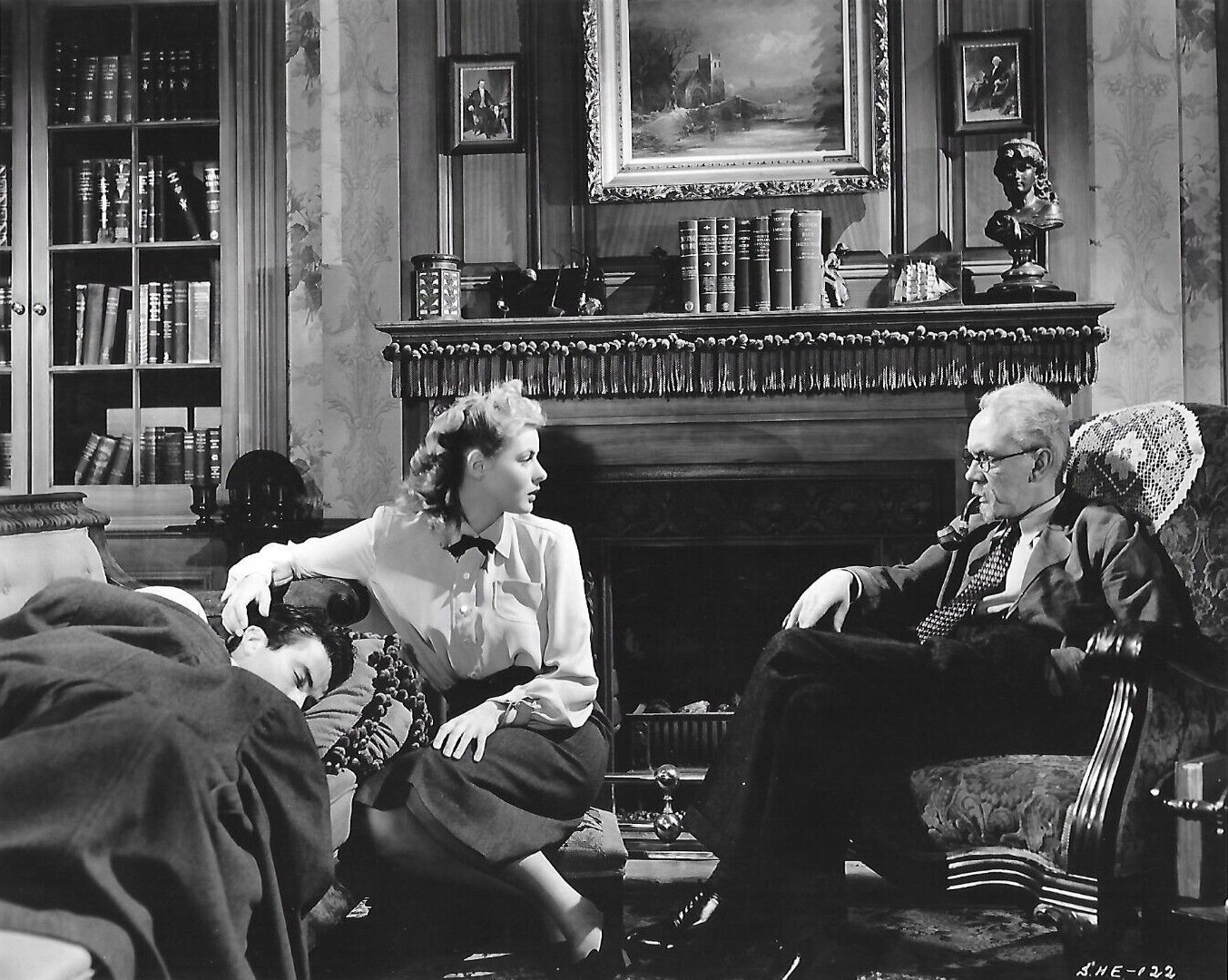
Chekhov (right) with Gregory Peck and Ingrid Bergman in Alfred Hitchcock's Spellbound (1945)

Year	Title	Role	Notes
1914	Kogda zvuchat struny serdtsa		
1915	Shkaf s syurprizom		
1916	Liubvi syurprizy tshchetnye		
1921	Erik XIV	Erik XIV	
1927	Einer gegen alle		
1927	Man from the Restaurant	Skorokhodov	
1929	Der Narr seiner Liebe	Didier Mireuil	
1930	Phantoms of Happiness	Jacques Bramard	
1930	Troika	Paschka, village idiot	
1944	Song of Russia	Ivan Stepanov	
1944	In Our Time	Uncle Leopold Baruta	
1945	Spellbound	Dr. Alexander Brulov	
1946	Specter of the Rose	Max Polikoff	
1946	Cross My Heart	Peter	
1946	Abie's Irish Rose	Solomon Levy	
1948	Texas, Brooklyn & Heaven	Mr. Gaboolian	
1952	Invitation	Dr. Fromm	
1952	Holiday for Sinners	Dr. Konndorff	
1954	Rhapsody	Professor Schuman	(final film role)

=== Bibliography ===
- Chekhov, Мichael. Литературное наследие: В 2 т. / Общ. науч. ред. М.О. Кнебель; сост.: И.И. Аброскина, М.С. Иванова, Н.А. Крымова; коммент. И.И. Аброскиной, М.С. Ивановой. М., 1995.
- Chekhov, Michael. On the Technique of Acting. Ed. Mel Gordon. New York: HarperCollins Publishers, 1991.
- Chekhov, Michael. The Paris Manuscript. The Early Draft Rediscovered. Ed. Hugo Moss. London: Bloomsbury Publishing Plc, 2025.
- Chekhov, Michael. To the Actor. New York: Harper & Brothers, 1953; Abingdon: Routledge, 2002.

== See also ==
- List of Russian Americans
- List of Academy Award winners and nominees from Russia
- List of actors with Academy Award nominations

== Sources ==
- Fleming, Cass; Cornford, Tom (15 October 2020). Michael Chekhov Technique in the Twenty-First Century: New Pathways. Bloomsbury Publishing. ISBN 978-1-4742-7320-6.
- Mathieu, Marie Christine Autant; Meerzon, Yana (15 May 2015). The Routledge Companion to Michael Chekhov. Routledge. ISBN 978-1-317-50686-7.
- Monday, Mark (7 September 2017). Directing with the Michael Chekhov Technique: A Workbook with Video for Directors, Teachers and Actors. Bloomsbury Publishing. ISBN 978-1-4742-7964-2.
- Rollberg, Peter (2009). "Chekhov, Mikhail Aleksandrovich". Historical Dictionary of Russian and Soviet Cinema. US: Rowman & Littlefield. pp. 135–136. ISBN 978-0-8108-6072-8.
- Stanton, Sarah; Banham, Martin, eds. (7 March 1996). "Chekhov, Michael". The Cambridge Paperback Guide to Theatre. Cambridge University Press. p. 64. ISBN 978-0-521-44654-9.
