= Alexander Chekhov =

Russian novelist (1855–1913)

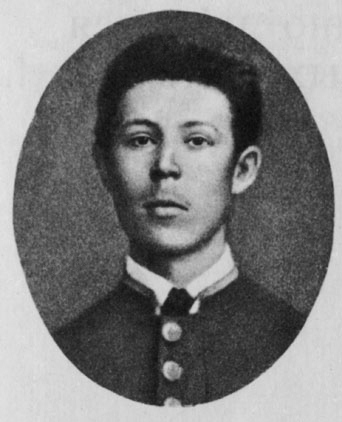
- Born: August 22, 1855; Taganrog, Russia
- Died: May 29, 1913 (aged 57); St. Petersburg, Russia
- Resting place: Literatorskiye Mostki, St. Petersburg
- Spouse: Natalya Golden
- Children: Michael Chekhov
- Relatives: Anton Chekhov (brother); Ada Tschechowa (granddaughter); Vera Tschechowa (great-granddaughter)

Alexander Pavlovich Chekhov (Russian: Александр Павлович Чехов; August 22 [O.S. August 10] 1855 – May 29, 1913), was a Russian novelist, short story writer, essayist and memoirist, and the eldest brother of Anton Chekhov. He was also the father of famed actor and progressive acting theorist Michael Chekhov.

Michael studied under Konstantin Stanislavski before incorporating his father's mystical philosophies with those of Rudolf Steiner to pioneer "Psycho-Physical" acting techniques.

Anton Chekhov often referred to Alexander as more intelligent, but unable to produce the work to prove it due to his alcoholism.

== Biography ==
Alexander was born into a petit-bourgeois merchant family. He studied at the Taganrog gymnasium, graduating in 1875 with a silver medal. He later graduated from the Natural Sciences Department of the Physics and Mathematics Faculty of Moscow State University. He spoke six languages.

In his student years his works were published in comic magazines such as The Spectator and The Alarm Clock, largely contributing to the familiarization of his younger brother Anton with the world of metropolitan journalism.

Upon leaving school he worked in the customs service in Taganrog (1882–85), St. Petersburg (1885) and Novorossiysk (1885–1886). He was dismissed from his post in Taganrog for a sensational story about the abuses of local customs officials, which he published in the Odessa newspaper.

He wrote under the pseudonyms Agafopod, Agafopod Edinitsin, Aloe and later A. Gray.

Married at a young age, Alexander was widowed in 1888, and the following year married the governess of his children, Natalya. From this marriage was born a son, the famous actor Michael Chekhov.

He died of throat cancer in 1913 and was buried in the literary section of the Volkovo Cemetery in St. Petersburg.

== Sources ==
- "Чехов, Александр Павлович" . Brockhaus and Efron Encyclopedic Dictionary (in Russian). 1906.
