= Desperado City =

1981West German drama film

- Directed by: Vadim Glowna
- Written by: Vadim Glowna
- Produced by: Vadim Glowna; Vera Tschechowa
- Starring: Siemen Rühaak
- Cinematography: Thomas Mauch
- Edited by: Helga Borsche
- Music by: Stanley Walden
- Production companies: Atossa Film Produktion GmbH; Kuratorium Junger Deutscher Film
- Distributed by: Filmwelt
- Release date: 23 April 1981 (Munich)
- Running time: 97 minutes
- Country: West Germany
- Language: German

Desperado City is a 1981 West German drama film written and directed by Vadim Glowna. It won the Caméra d'Or at the 1981 Cannes Film Festival.

The film takes place in Hamburg. Skoda (Siemen Rühaak) is a former student from a rich family. His father is a banker. Skoda is looking for an alternative life, away from the capitalist opulence of his childhood home. He stays with Eva Buchholz, with whom he begins a love story after she buys him a taxi.

The film follows Skoda on his nightly rides through the city, and though different characters come and go. He takes his taxi to St. Pauli. Here Skoda meets the girl Liane, a kindred spirit in the form of a teenage woman who finds her own home life equally difficult to shoulder, who is just as fed up with her life as he is. She just quit her hairdressing training. The two now spend the days together and dream of emigrating to America. The two outsiders are gradually attracted to each other, and they end up one night in Skoda's room together.

At that moment, Eva opens the door and discovers his infidelity. Eva then takes her own life for fear of renewed loneliness, which she no longer wants to endure, and Skoda is blamed for her death by her ex-husband. He swears to avenge her, and the hunt for Skoda begins.

The stripper Hilke also dies. She is murdered by pimps.

In this world of dirt and death, Skoda is now looking for a decision for his own life. He robs his father's bank and is shot by a security guard.

== Cast ==
- Siemen Rühaak as Skoda
- Beate Finckh as Liane
- Vera Tschechowa as Hilke
- Karin Baal as Eva Buchholz
- Witta Pohl as Gertrud
