= One Prettier Than the Other =

1961 film

- Directed by: Axel von Ambesser
- Written by: Dieter Hildebrandt; Gustav Kampendonk; Aldo von Pinelli
- Produced by: Hans Otto Schröder
- Starring: Heidi Brühl; Christiane Nielsen; Senta Berger
- Cinematography: Igor Oberberg
- Edited by: Heinz Haber
- Music by: Werner Scharfenberger
- Production company: Melodie Film
- Distributed by: UFA Film Hansa
- Release date: 19 May 1961
- Running time: 90 minutes
- Country: West Germany
- Language: German

One Prettier Than the Other (German: Eine hübscher als die andere) is a 1961 West German comedy film directed by Axel von Ambesser and starring Heidi Brühl, Christiane Nielsen and Senta Berger. It was shot at the Tempelhof Studios in West Berlin. The film's sets were designed by the art director Peter Röhrig.

== Synopsis ==
The playboy Peter returns from the United States at the urging of his wealthy father. He brings with him his three girlfriends and wants each of them to have a designer dress. Gaby the dress designer he encounters is very unimpressed by him, but he is fascinated by her independent sport and sets out to win her over.

== Cast ==
- Heidi Brühl as Gaby Fabian
- Christiane Nielsen as Eva Wallenstein
- Senta Berger as Lilly Haase
- Christiane Maybach as Dorothee Liebig
- Renate Grosser as Beate Lengenfeld
- Rudolf Platte as Franz Kullmann
- Karl Schönböck as Edgar Dirksen
- Peter Nestler as Peter "Pitt" Seeberg
- Ralf Wolter as Straßenkehrer
- Willi Rose as Nitschke, Werkmeister
- Erland Erlandsen as Geschäftsführer im Restaurant
- Adeline Wagner as Kundin im Autohaus
- Peter Vogel as Moritz Schröder
- Gustav Knuth as Konsul Otto Seeberg

== Bibliography ==
- Bock, Hans-Michael & Bergfelder, Tim. The Concise CineGraph. Encyclopedia of German Cinema. Berghahn Books, 2009.
- Hobsch, Manfred . Liebe, Tanz und 1000 Schlagerfilme. Schwarzkopf & Schwarzkopf, 1998.
