= List of number-one hits of 1960 (Germany) =

This is a list of the German Media Control Top100 Singles Chart number-ones of 1960.

Issue date	Song	Artist
2 January	"Marina"	Rocco Granata
9 January	"Marina"	Rocco Granata
16 January	"Marina"	Rocco Granata
23 January	"Marina"	Rocco Granata
30 January	"Marina"	Rocco Granata
6 February	"Marina"	Rocco Granata
13 February	"Marina"	Rocco Granata
20 February	"Marina"	Rocco Granata
27 February	"Marina"	Rocco Granata
5 March	"Banjo Boy"	Jan & Kjeld
12 March	"Banjo Boy"	Jan & Kjeld
19 March	"Banjo Boy"	Jan & Kjeld
26 March	"Banjo Boy"	Jan & Kjeld
2 April	"Banjo Boy"	Jan & Kjeld
9 April	"Banjo Boy"	Jan & Kjeld
16 April	"Banjo Boy"	Jan & Kjeld
23 April	"Banjo Boy"	Jan & Kjeld
30 April	"Banjo Boy"	Jan & Kjeld
7 May	"Banjo Boy"	Jan & Kjeld
14 May	"Wir wollen niemals auseinandergehn"	Heidi Brühl
21 May	"Wir wollen niemals auseinandergehn"	Heidi Brühl
28 May	"Wir wollen niemals auseinandergehn"	Heidi Brühl
4 June	"Wir wollen niemals auseinandergehn"	Heidi Brühl
11 June	"Wir wollen niemals auseinandergehn"	Heidi Brühl
18 June	"Wir wollen niemals auseinandergehn"	Heidi Brühl
25 June	"Wir wollen niemals auseinandergehn"	Heidi Brühl
2 July	"Milord"	Dalida
9 July	"Milord"	Dalida
16 July	"Milord"	Dalida
23 July	"Milord"	Dalida
30 July	"Milord"	Dalida
6 August	"Milord"	Dalida
13 August	"Milord"	Dalida
20 August	"Milord"	Dalida
27 August	"Milord"	Dalida
3 September	"Kalkutta liegt am Ganges"	Vico Torriani
10 September	"Kalkutta liegt am Ganges"	Vico Torriani
17 September	"Itsy Bitsy Teenie Weenie Honolulu-Strand-Bikini"	Club Honolulu
24 September	"Itsy Bitsy Teenie Weenie Honolulu-Strand-Bikini"	Club Honolulu
1 October	"Itsy Bitsy Teenie Weenie Honolulu-Strand-Bikini"	Club Honolulu
8 October	"Die Liebe ist ein seltsames Spiel"	Connie Francis
15 October	"Die Liebe ist ein seltsames Spiel"	Connie Francis
22 October	"Ein Schiff wird kommen"	Lale Andersen
29 October	"Ein Schiff wird kommen"	Lale Andersen
5 November	"Ein Schiff wird kommen"	Lale Andersen
12 November	"Ein Schiff wird kommen"	Lale Andersen
19 November	"Ein Schiff wird kommen"	Lale Andersen
26 November	"Ein Schiff wird kommen"	Lale Andersen
3 December	"Ein Schiff wird kommen"	Lale Andersen
10 December	"Ein Schiff wird kommen"	Lale Andersen
17 December	"Ein Schiff wird kommen"	Lale Andersen
24 December	"Ein Schiff wird kommen"	Lale Andersen
31 December	"Ramona"	Blue Diamonds
