= Frau im Spiegel =

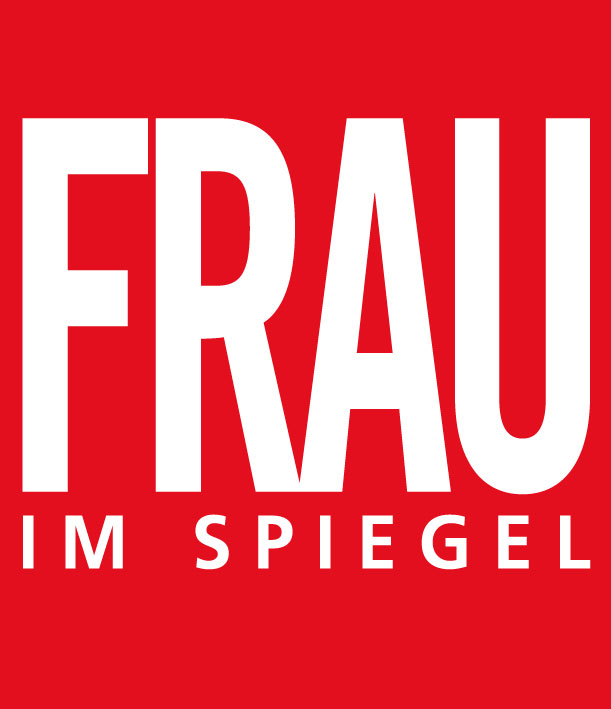
- Editor-in-Chief: Claudia Cieslarczyk
- Categories: Women's interest
- Frequency: Weekly
- Total circulation: 145,000 (2024)
- First issue: 1946
- Company: Funke Mediengruppe
- Country: Germany
- Based in: Munich
- Language: German
- Website: www.frau-im-spiegel.de
- ISSN: 0046-497X

Frau im Spiegel (English lit. "Woman in the Mirror") is a German weekly magazine for women based in Munich, Germany.

== History and profile ==
The magazine first appeared in 1946. It was distributed by the Hamburg based Verlag Ehrlich & Sohn. The magazine is published weekly by the Funke Women Group GMBH. The magazine has its headquarters in Munich. It is also distributed in the United States by German Language Publications in Englewood, NJ.

Like other German tabloid magazines, it reports about European royalty and other celebrities, including gossip and scandals. Other regular topics are health, make-up tips, fashion, and travel.

According to G+J Electronic Media Sales, the average age of the 88% female readership is age 42.4. The chief editor is Karin Schlautmann.

In the period of 2001-2002 Frau im Spiegel was one of top 50 women's magazine worldwide with a circulation of 645,000 copies. In the third quarter of 2005 the magazine sold 553,051 copies. During the second quarter of 2016 its circulation was down to 236,427 copies.
