= Gero Wecker =

German film producer

- Born: 22 April 1923; Göttingen, Weimar Republic
- Died: 24 June 1974 (aged 51); West Berlin, West Germany
- Occupation: Producer
- Years active: 1955–1974 (film)

Gero Wecker (1923–1974) was a German film producer. In the post-Second World War era he produced populist entertainment films for the West German market.

== Career ==
Wecker founded Arca-Filmproduktion GmbH in 1953. The company was based in Göttingen, Germany.

== Selected filmography ==
- The Immenhof Girls (1955)
- Three Girls from the Rhine (1955)
- Without You All Is Darkness (1956)
- The Mad Bomberg (1957)
- The Girl Without Pyjamas (1957)
- Different from You and Me (1957)
- Court Martial (1959)
- Bombs on Monte Carlo (1960)
- The White Spider (1963)
- A Holiday Like Never Before (1963)
- The Inn on Dartmoor (1964)
- Two Girls from the Red Star (1966)
- The Twins from Immenhof (1973)
- Spring in Immenhof (1974)

== Personal ==
In August 1947, Wecker married Carola Bornée (born 1924), with whom he had two daughters, Cornelia (born 1948) and Angela (born 1952). Gero and Carola divorced in 1961. Gero Wecker then, in the 1960s, married actress Karin Jacobsen, with whom he had a daughter, Michaela (born 1967). Wecker and Jacobson divorced.

== Bibliography ==
- Giesen, Rolf. Nazi Propaganda Films: A History and Filmography. McFarland, 2003.
