= The Immenhof Girls =

1955 film

- Directed by: Wolfgang Schleif
- Written by: Ursula Bruns (novel); Erich Ebermayer; Peer Baedecker; Wolfgang Schleif; Hansi Keßler
- Produced by: Gero Wecker
- Starring: Heidi Brühl; Margarete Haagen; Paul Henckels
- Cinematography: Oskar Schnirch
- Edited by: Hermann Ludwig
- Music by: Norbert Schultze
- Production company: Arca-Filmproduktion
- Distributed by: Neue Filmverleih
- Release date: 11 August 1955
- Running time: 87 minutes
- Country: West Germany
- Language: German

The Immenhof Girls (German: Die Mädels vom Immenhof) is a 1955 West German comedy drama film directed by Wolfgang Schleif and starring Heidi Brühl, Margarete Haagen and Paul Henckels. It was filmed using Eastmancolor. The film's sets were designed by the art director Karl Weber. Location shooting took place around Schleswig-Holstein.

== Cast ==
- Angelika Meissner as Dick
- Heidi Brühl as Dalli
- Christiane König as Angela
- Margarete Haagen as Oma Jantzen
- Paul Henckels as Dr. Pudlich
- Paul Klinger as Jochen von Roth
- Josef Sieber as Hein Daddel
- Matthias Fuchs as Ethelbert
- Tilo von Berlepsch as Gerichtsvollzieher
- Dirk Dautzenberg as Herr Pötz, Feriengast
- Ruth Lommel as Esther Brandt, Feriengast
- Peter Tost as Mans

== Sequels ==
- Hochzeit auf Immenhof (1956)
- Ferien auf Immenhof (1957)
- The Twins from Immenhof (1973)
- Spring in Immenhof (1974)

== See also ==
- List of films about horses

== Bibliography ==
- Hake, Sabine. German National Cinema. Routledge, 2002.
