= Spring in Immenhof =

1974 film directed by Wolfgang Schleif

- Directed by: Wolfgang Schleif
- Written by: Wolfgang Schleif; Lothar Kompatzki; Kurt Nachmann
- Produced by: Gero Wecker
- Starring: Heidi Brühl; Horst Janson; Olga Chekhova
- Cinematography: Igor Oberberg
- Edited by: Christel Orthmann; Sybille Windt
- Music by: Ernst Brandner
- Production companies: Arca-Winston Films; Terra-Filmkunst
- Distributed by: Constantin Film
- Release date: 13 September 1974
- Running time: 93 minutes
- Country: West Germany
- Language: German

Spring in Immenhof (German: Frühling auf Immenhof) is a 1974 West German family film directed by Wolfgang Schleif and starring Heidi Brühl, Horst Janson and Olga Chekhova. It is the fifth and last of the series of Immenhof films, part of the heimatfilm tradition. It marked the final film appearance of the veteran actress Olga Chekhova.

== Cast ==
- Heidi Brühl as Brigitte 'Dalli' Voss
- Horst Janson as Alexander Arkens
- Birgit Westhausen as Billy
- Bettina Westhausen as Bobby
- Olga Chekhova as Großmutter
- Giulia Follina as Sigrid
- Katharina Brauren as Mutter Carsten
- Vera Gruber as Stine
- Henry Vahl as Wedderkopp-Vater
- Franz Schafheitlin as Dr. Tiedemann
- Günter Lüdke as Ole
- Wolfram Schaerf as Henning Holm
- Alexander Grill as Döberlein
- Thomas Balzer as Hasso
- Esther Rudat as Eva
- Martina Glietz as Suse
- Sönke Rowedder as Zeck

== Bibliography ==
- Hans-Michael Bock and Tim Bergfelder. The Concise Cinegraph: An Encyclopedia of German Cinema. Berghahn Books, 2009.
