= Olga Knipper =

Russian and Soviet stage actress (1868–1959)

- Ольга Книппер
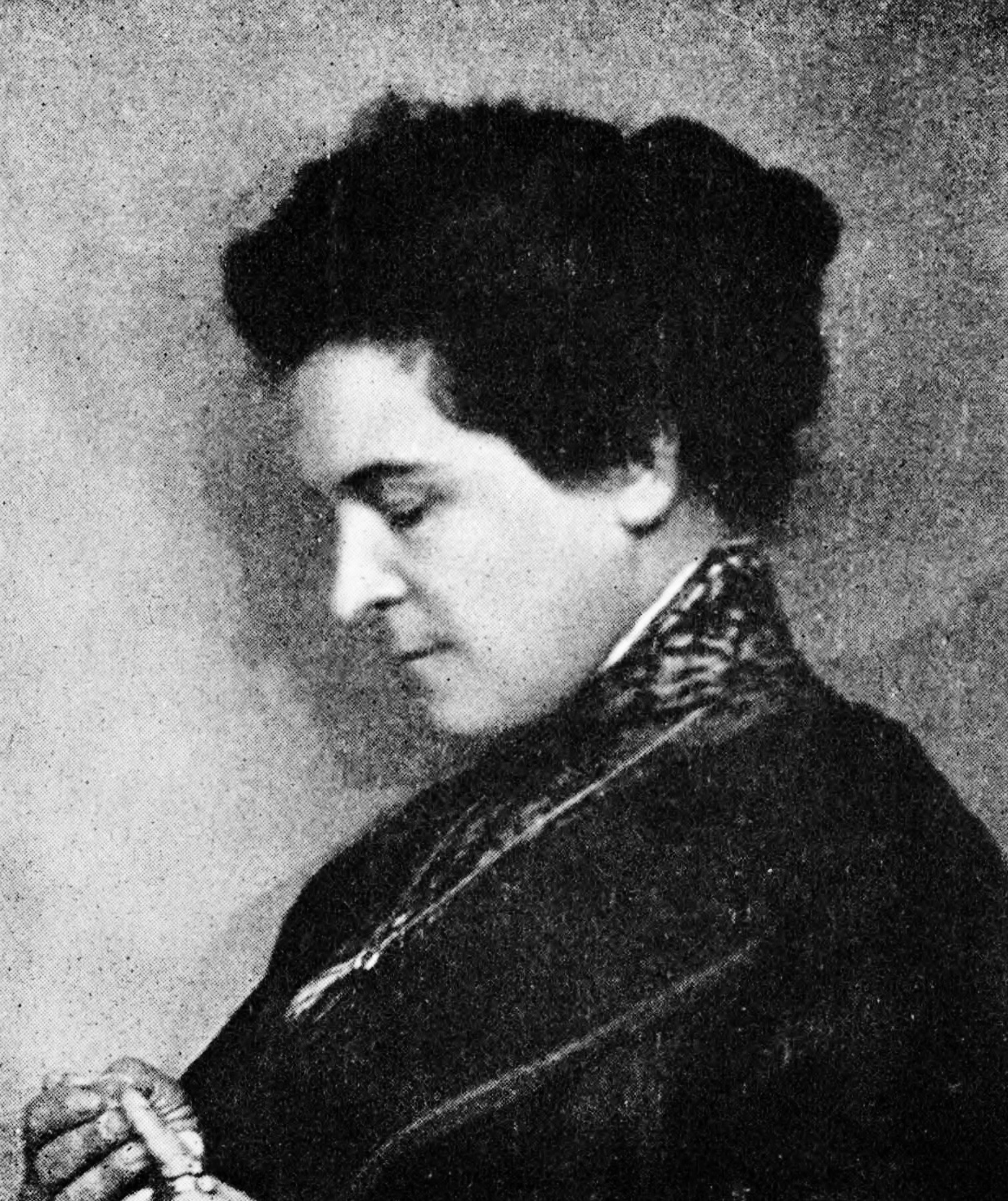
- Born: 21 September [O.S. 9 September] 1868; Glazov, Russian Empire
- Died: 22 March 1959 (aged 90); Moscow, Soviet Union
- Spouse: Anton Chekhov (m. 1901; died 1904)
- Relatives: Olga Chekhova (niece); Lev Knipper (nephew); Marina Ried (great-niece); Vera Tschechowa (great-great niece)

Olga Leonardovna Knipper-Chekhova (Russian: Ольга Леонардовна Книппер-Чехова; 21 September [O.S. 9 September] 1868 – 22 March 1959) was a Russian and Soviet stage actress. She was married to Anton Chekhov.

Knipper was among the 39 original members of the Moscow Art Theatre when it was formed by Konstantin Stanislavski in 1898. She played Arkadina in The Seagull (1898), played Elena in the Moscow premiere of Uncle Vanya (1899), and was the first to play Masha in Three Sisters (1901) and Madame Ranevskaya in The Cherry Orchard (1904). She married Anton Chekhov, the author of these plays, in 1901. She played Ranevskaya again in 1943, when the theatre marked the 300th performance of The Cherry Orchard.

== Early life ==
Knipper was born on 21 September [O.S. 9 September] 1868 in Glazov to Austrian-born Leonhardt August Knipper and his wife, Anna Ivanovna von Saltza, who was of Baltic German noble descent. Though both of her parents were of German origin, her father claimed Russia as their family heritage. Around the time of Olga's birth, her father, Leonard, was in charge of a factory in Glazov, a small town northeast of European Russia. Two years after she was born, her family moved to Moscow, where they became accustomed to an upper-middle-class lifestyle. Growing up as the middle child along with her two brothers, Konstantin and Vladimir, Olga was pampered. She attended a private school for girls, achieved fluency in French, German and English, and took music and singing lessons after her rigorous day in school. She showed considerable promise as a painter and was her own accompanist on the piano when she entertained friends and family at dinner parties. Her father, however, who was anxious to conform to the social conventions of his adopted country, made it clear that Olga's aspirations should be confined to marrying well and becoming a housewife. Her mother, a talented singer and pianist, had been forced to give up any hopes of a career in the arts, and felt that Olga should do the same.

In 1894, Olga's father died unexpectedly, leaving the 25-year-old and her mother with debts incurred from living well beyond their means. They dismissed four of their five servants, moved to a smaller flat and gave music and singing lessons to make ends meet. Olga's hope of becoming a successful stage actress had not yet diminished. She proceeded without her mother's approval and abandoned her social circle, sacrifices she was willing to make: "Whenever in my life I really wanted something, and really believed in the possibility of achieving what I wanted and acted energetically, I always succeeded and never regretted going my own way", she wrote.

== Career ==
She enrolled briefly into the Maly Theatre's drama school, although she dropped out one month later. With the help of her reluctant mother, Olga enrolled at the Philharmonic School, where she was taught by the future co-founder of the Moscow Art Theatre, Vladimir Nemirovich-Danchenko. Nemirovich introduced Knipper and fellow student Vsevolod Meyerhold (who would later become one of the most prominent figures of Russian theatre after the Revolution) to Constantin Stanislavski.

Told in strict confidence, Nemirovich confessed to Knipper and Meierhold that he and Stanislavski were planning the creation of a new theatre company. Nemirovich assured the two actors that they would be invited to join this company and to help lead it to greatness. After many weeks, enough capital was finally secured to found the new company. The company gathered in Pushkino, where Stanislavski addressed Knipper and the other members, telling them that he hoped they had all come to dedicate their lives to creating the "first rational, moral, and universally accessible theatre in Russia."

== Chekhov ==
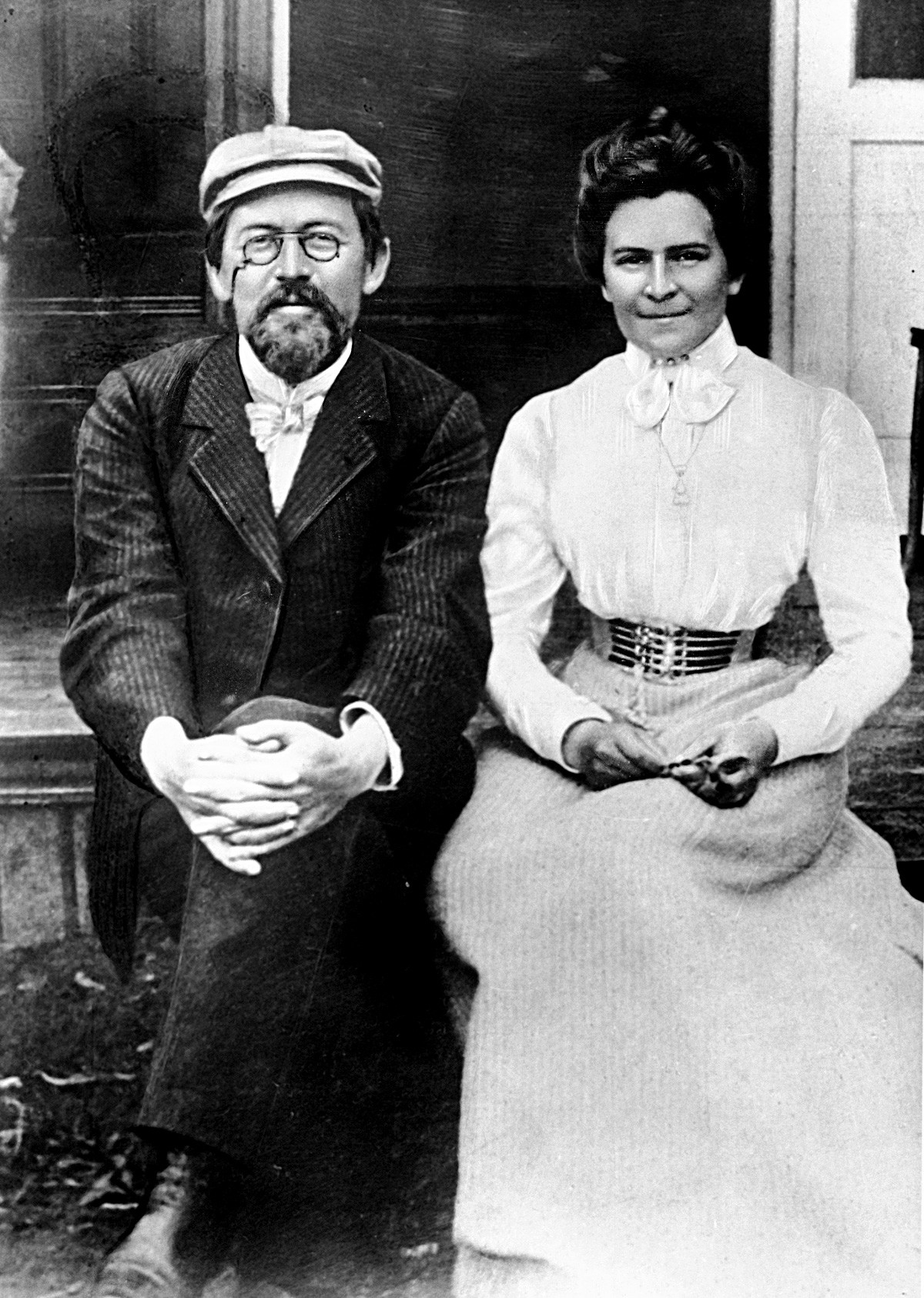
Knipper with Chekhov on their honeymoon in 1901

While rehearsing for The Seagull on 9 September, Olga's 30th birthday, she met Russia's most eligible literary bachelor and playwright of The Seagull, Anton Chekhov, then 38. Knipper and Chekhov exchanged telegrams and letters for the next few years, while Olga became more familiar with Chekhov's younger sister, Masha. Random letters of teasing and playfulness became letters of love and deep remorse that they lived so far apart from each other. Olga's true colors shone throughout her letters of correspondence. Her ill-moods, volatile tempers, combined with her sporadic high spirits, kept Chekhov on his toes. In the winter of 1900, Chekhov returned from Yalta and headed to Moscow, with a new play that he had written with a 'dear actress' in mind. "What a part I’ve got for you in Three Sisters. Give me ten rubles and you can have it, otherwise I’ll give it to another actress", Chekhov wrote to Olga.

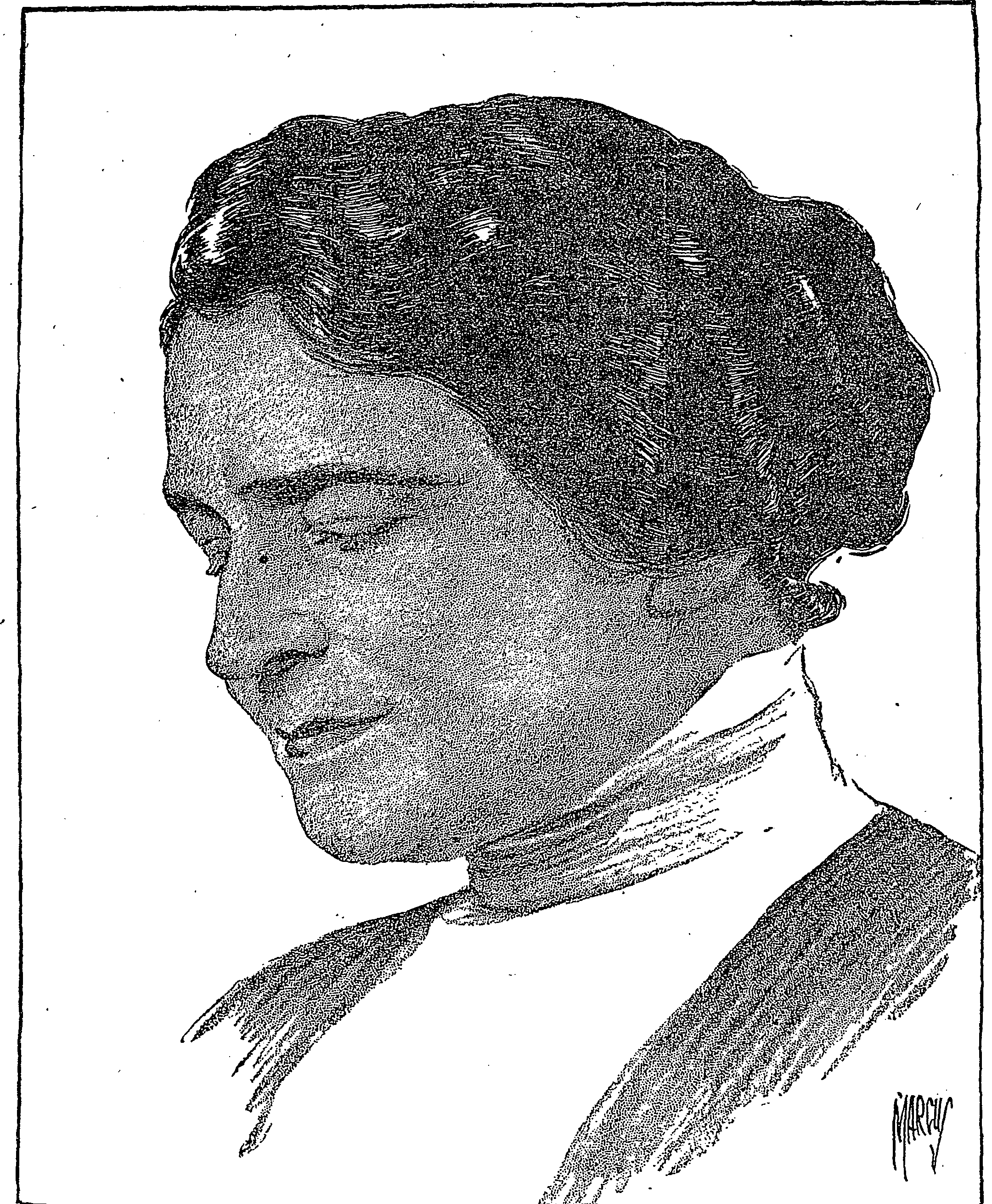
Drawing of Knipper as Masha in Three Sisters in 1923 Broadway production

Many similarities existed between Olga Knipper and the character Chekhov wrote for her in Three Sisters, Masha. Knipper was to play the middle of three sisters and one brother. The only married sibling of the foursome and "the most original and talented of the three sisters. To portray a young woman of culture and refinement, who speaks French, German and English, and is a first-class pianist" was no problem for Knipper who already acquired those skills. Knipper received much praise for her portrayal as Masha, much to Chekhov's amusement.

Anton Chekhov and Olga Knipper eventually married on 25 May 1901 at the Church of the Exaltation of the Cross, in Moscow. It was a spur of the moment, small wedding about which hardly anyone knew, including Chekhov's mother and sister, and Olga's mother. Many close friends and family were hurt by the secrecy. Their marriage ended when Chekhov died of tuberculosis in 1904.

It has been claimed in 1902 she had an operation to abort an ectopic pregnancy. The conception must have taken place at a time when she and Chekhov were temporarily living apart and he could not have been the father; as Chekhov was a doctor he would have realised this.

== Death ==
Olga Leonardovna Knipper-Chekhova worked with the Moscow Art Theatre for the remainder of her life. On 22 March 1959, she died in Moscow at the age of 90.

== Sources ==
- Sekirin, Peter, ed. (14 October 2011). Memories of Chekhov: Accounts of the Writer from His Family, Friends and Contemporaries. McFarland. ISBN 978-0-7864-8644-1.
- Gottlieb, Vera; Allain, Paul (4 November 2000). The Cambridge Companion to Chekhov. Cambridge University Press. ISBN 978-0-521-58917-8.
