= Lev Knipper =

Soviet Russian composer (1898–1974)

- Лев Книппер
- Born: 21 November 1898 [O.S. 3 December] Tiflis, Tiflis Governorate, Russian Empire
- Died: 30 July 1974 (aged 75); Moscow, Russian SFSR, Soviet Union
- Other name: Лев Константинович Книппер
- Occupations: Composer, secret police agent
- Years active: 1922–1974
- Spouses: Lyubov Sergeevna Zalesskaya (divorced) Mariya Garikovna Melikova (divorced): Tatiana Alekseevna Gaidamovich
- Relatives: Olga Knipper (aunt); Olga Chekhova (sister); Andrey Lvovich Knipper (son)

Lev Konstantinovich Knipper (Russian: Лев Константинович Книппер; 3 December [O.S. 21 November] 1898 – 30 July 1974) was a Soviet and Russian composer and OGPU/NKVD agent.

== Life and career ==
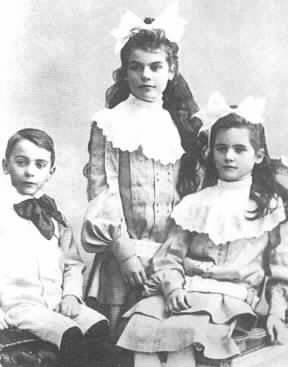
Young Lev (left) with sisters Ada (center) and Olga (right); date unknown

Lev Knipper was born in Tiflis to railway engineer Konstantin Leonardovich Knipper and Elena-Luiza Yulyevna Rid. Shortly after his birth, the family relocated to Tsarskoye Selo, then to Yekaterinoslav in 1910, and then Saint Petersburg in 1913. He was greatly influenced by his father's sister, the actress Olga Knipper (wife of the playwright Anton Chekhov), who encouraged his musical interests. He learned to play clarinet, double bass, various brass instruments, and taught himself to play piano.

Knipper enlisted in the White Army in 1916. Following the Russian Civil War of 1917, he became stranded in Turkey, though was eventually able to reunite with his aunt Olga, who was touring abroad. Upon his return to the RSFSR in 1922, he was repeatedly interviewed and ultimately recruited by the OGPU foreign department. At their behest, Knipper travelled to Germany in 1922–23, where he made the acquaintance of composers Alois Hába, Philipp Jarnach, and Paul Hindemith. Hindemith's music in particular had a strong influence on Knipper's own compositional language.

Through the connections of his aunt, Knipper made the acquaintance of Elena Gnesina, who hired him as building administrator at the Gnessin Music School in Moscow. Though Knipper was too old to be officially admitted as a student, he was nonetheless able to study with Reinhold Glière and Nikolai Zhilyayev. He wrote his first catalogued composition, the orchestral suite Tales of a Plaster God, Op. 1, in 1923; a work musicologist Larry Sitsky characterized as "harsh and chiseled", and somewhat grotesque. Inspired by sculptures of the Buddha by Pavel Tchelitchew, the six-movement suite premiered on 8 March 1925 and was well received by audiences and critics. Fellow composer Leonid Sabaneyev approached Knipper at the premiere and asked for a copy of the score. In 1929, Knipper was invited by Vladimir Nemirovich-Danchenko to work as a consultant at the Moscow Art Theatre. This led to the creation of Knipper's most significant work of this early period, his 1930 opera The North Wind, Op. 25, based on the play by Vladimir Kirshon. Musicologist Gerald Abraham described the opera as "harmonically sophisticated, dry, [and] more than a little Hindemithian". The opera is also noted for its defiance of typical operatic conventions. The North Wind received a total of seventy-eight performances, mostly in Moscow, but following harsh criticism from the RAPM it was not staged again until 1974.

Seemingly in response to criticism of his modernist early works, Knipper resigned his post as technical secretary to the ACM and abruptly shifted his style towards one more in line with the principles of socialist realism. In 1930–1931, he travelled to Central Asia to study the region's folk music. He was particularly drawn to Tajik music, which directly influenced eight of his works. The majority of Knipper's works from this period are musically conservative, and patriotic and militaristic in tone, most notably his "song-symphonies" (3, 4 and 6). The most prominent of these is his Fourth Symphony, "Poem of the Komsomol Fighter", Op. 41 (1934); with lyrics by Viktor Gusev and dedicated to Kliment Voroshilov. The central theme of the symphony, the song Polyushko-polye, has become Knipper's most famous work as one of the marching songs in the repertoire of the Alexandrov Ensemble. Though in line with Soviet political ideals, these song-symphonies were met with criticism by some of Knipper's fellow composers. Dmitri Shostakovich lambasted Knipper's Third Symphony (1932) for its "primitiveness" at a meeting of the Union of Soviet Composers in 1935. Dmitry Kabalevsky pointed out the shortcomings of Knipper's approach to combining mass-songs and the surrounding symphonic material. In his Sixth Symphony, Op. 47 (1936), Knipper apparently veered too close to his earlier style and was publicly rebuked for it; his Seventh Symphony "Military" (1938) returned to an ideologically safer style.

Knipper continued to compose during the Great Patriotic War, though much of his time was devoted to extensive travel for the NKVD, which he continued to serve until 1949. According to secret intelligence documents released in 2002, Knipper and his wife were to play a key role if the Nazis should capture Moscow. Under the plan, ballerinas and circus acrobats were to be armed with grenades and pistols in order to assassinate German generals if they attempted to organize concerts and other celebrations in the event of the city's capture. Knipper was personally charged with the responsibility of killing Adolf Hitler; an opportunity the NKVD suspected might arise due to Knipper's sister, Olga, having social connections with high-ranking Nazis, including Hermann Göring.

Knipper was prolific. He wrote 5 operas (including one on The Little Prince), 20 symphonies, ballets, pieces for piano and other film musics.

The primary publishers of Knipper's works are Muzyka, Kompozitor and Le Chant du Monde. Most of his published compositions are currently out of print, and the majority of his output has yet to be published.

== List of works ==
=== Symphonies ===
- Symphony No. 1 in 4 parts, Op. 13 (1926) – dedicated to Olga Knipper
- Symphony No. 2, Op. 30 (1929)
- Symphony No. 3 "Far East," Op. 32 (1932) – poetry by Viktor Gusev
- Sinfonietta, Op. 33 (1932)
- Symphony No. 4 "Poem for the Komsomol Fighters" (1934, rev. 1966) – poetry by Viktor Gusev
- Symphony No. 5 (1935)
- Symphony No. 6, Op. 47 (1936)
- Symphony No. 7 "Military" in 3 parts (1938)
- Symphony No. 8 in 3 movements (1941)
- Symphony No. 9 in 4 movements (1944–45)
- Symphony No. 10 in 4 movements (1946) – dedicated to Nikolai Myaskovsky
- Symphony No. 11 in 4 movements (1949)
- Symphony No. 12 in 3 parts (1950)
- Symphony No. 13 in 4 parts (1951–52) – dedicated to Nikolai Myaskovsky
- Sinfonietta in 4 movements (1952)
- Symphony in 4 movements (1954)
- Symphony No. 14 for string orchestra in 4 parts (1961–62)
- Symphony No. 15 (1962)
- Symphony No. 16 (1962–69)
- Symphony No. 17 in 3 movements (1969–70)
- Symphony No. 18 (1970–71)
- Sinfonietta for string orchestra in 4 movements (1971–72)
- Symphony No. 20 in 3 parts (1972)
- Symphony No. 21 "Dances" in 5 parts (1972)

=== Concertante ===
- Violin
  - Souvenir: Six pieces for violin and symphony orchestra, Op. 31 (1932)
  - Three Variations on a Theme for violin and symphony orchestra, Op. 31a (1932)
  - Concerto No. 1 (1942–44) – dedicated to Olga Knipper
  - Sonatina for violin and string orchestra (1948)
  - Concertino for violin and string orchestra (1962)
  - Little Concerto in Classical Style (1964–65) – dedicated to Arkady Futer
  - Concerto No. 3 (1969–70) – dedicated to Leonid Kogan
- Viola
  - Concerto (1962)
- Cello
  - Concerto-Monologue for cello, seven brass instruments and timpani (1962) – dedicated to Mstislav Rostropovich
  - Concerto-Poem for cello and chamber orchestra (1971) – dedicated to Natalia Shakhovskaya
- Woodwinds
  - Clarinet Concerto (1967) – dedicated to Rafael Bagdasarian
  - Concerto-Suite for oboe, string quartet and percussion (1968) – dedicated to Konstantin Paustovsky
  - Concerto for bassoon and string orchestra (1969–70) – dedicated to Valery Popov
- Brass
  - Four Improvisations & Finale for horn and string orchestra (1971)
- Double concertos
  - for violin, cello and orchestra (1945)
  - for violin, cello and wind septet (1967) - dedicated to Tatiana Alekseevna Gaidamovich
  - for trumpet and bassoon (1968)
- String quartet
  - Radif: suite in Iranian style for string quartet and string orchestra (1944)
  - Concerto for string quartet and orchestra (1963)
  - Symphonic Concerto for string quartet and symphony orchestra (1964–65)

=== Chamber music ===
- Reflections: Six sketches for flute and clarinet, Op. 11 (1925)
- To my Son: Four miniatures, Op. 27 (1931) – dedicated to Andrey Lvovich Knipper
- Four Pieces for violin and piano (1943)
- String quartets
  - No. 1 (1943) – dedicated to the Bolshoi Quartet
  - Six Miniatures on Kirghiz Themes (1956)
  - No. 2 (1962)
  - No. 3 (1972–73) – dedicated to N. M. Skuzovatova
- Concert Scherzo for violin and piano (1962)
- Pieces for flute and harp (1963)
- Piano trios
  - No. 1 (1968–71) – dedicated to Tatiana Alekseevna Gaidamovich
  - No. 2 (1971–73) – dedicated to Tatiana Alekseevna Gaidamovich
- Concert Etude for flute and trumpet (1971)
- Scherzo for flute, trumpet and piano (1971)

=== Film music ===
- The Private Life of Pyotr Vinogradov (1934)
- The Red Cavalry (1935)
- The Soviet Coast (documentary, 1951)
- Immortal Pages (documentary, 1965)

== Honors and awards ==
- Order of the Badge of Honour
- Stalin Prize – 1946 and 1949
- People's Artist of the RSFSR – 1974
