= List of World War II feature films =

This is a list of fictional feature films or miniseries which feature events of World War II in the narrative.

There is a separate list of World War II TV series.

== Criteria ==
- The film or miniseries must be concerned with World War II (or the War of Ethiopia and the Sino-Japanese War) and include events which feature as a part of the war effort.
- For short films, see the List of World War II short films.
- For documentaries, see the List of World War II documentary films and the List of Allied propaganda films of World War II.

Fictional feature films specifically pertaining to the Holocaust appear in the List of Holocaust films#Narrative films.

== Common topics ==
Many aspects of this conflict have repeatedly been the subject of drama. These common subjects will not be linked when they appear in the film descriptions below:

Europe

- Adolf Hitler, Nazi Party and Nazism
- National Socialist Germany (Third Reich)
- Benito Mussolini and Fascism
- Kingdom of Italy (and Fascist Italy) and Italian Social Republic
- Death camps, Nazi concentration camps, earlier concentration camps
- Partition and occupation of Poland and Polish resistance
- Occupied France, Vichy France and French Resistance
- Occupied Norway
- The Holocaust

Asia–Pacific

- Emperor Shōwa and Imperialism
- Empire of Japan (Japanese Imperial)

Non-geographical

- POW

== Films made during the War of Ethiopia and the Sino-Japanese War ==
Before the Second World War explicitly began with the Nazi German, then later Soviet (Russian) invasions of Poland in September 1939, Germany had already absorbed Austria in the Anschluß of 1938, then the Czechoslovak lands of Bohemia and Moravia. Meanwhile, Italy, Germany, and the Soviet Union were involved in the Spanish Civil War, (1936–1939), and Italy had conquered Ethiopia (1935–1936) and Albania (1939). China had been fighting against Japan since the 1931 invasion of their northeastern province of Manchuria in a war that completely opened in 1937, called the Second Sino-Japanese War, until Japan attacked the U.S.A. at Pearl Harbor on 7 December 1941, then the British Empire and the Dutch East Indies colonial possessions also in December 1941.

=== 1936 ===
Country	Main title (Alternative titles)	Original title (Original script)	Director	Battles, campaigns, events depicted
Italy	The Great Appeal	Il grande appello	Mario Camerini	Italian father and son in the War of Ethiopia
Nazi Germany	The Traitor	Verräter	Karl Ritter	Foreign spies in a German armaments factory

=== 1937 ===
Country	Main title (Alternative titles)	Original title (Original script)	Director	Battles, campaigns, events depicted
Italy	Sentinels of Bronze	Sentinelle di bronzo	Romolo Marcellini	Italian colonial soldiers defeat the Ethiopian attack on Walwal
Japan	Song of Marching ^{†}	Shingun no uta (進軍の歌)	Yasushi Sasaki	Volunteer in the Japanese Army fighting in China

=== 1938 ===
Country	Main title (Alternative titles)	Original title (Original script)	Director	Battles, campaigns, events depicted
Japan	Chocolate and Soldiers	Chocolate to heitai (チョコレートと兵隊)	Takeshi Sato	Japanese Army soldier's battlefield letters with chocolate wrappers sent to son while fighting in China
Soviet Union	Concentration Camp (Bog Soldiers / Soldiers of the Swamp)	Bolotnye soldaty (Болотные солдаты)	Aleksandr Macheret	Nazi concentration camp guards attempt to break spirits of Communists
China	The Eight Hundred Heroes	Bā bǎi zhuàngshì (八百壮士)	Ying Yunwei	Defense of Sihang Warehouse
France	It Happened in Gibraltar	Gibraltar	Fedor Ozep	British officer in Gibraltar pretends to be traitor
Japan	Invisible Invader	Sugata-naki shinnyūsha (姿無き侵入者)	Shuzo Fukuda	Foreign spies in Japan pretend to be travelers
Italy	Luciano Serra, Pilot	Luciano Serra pilota	Goffredo Alessandrini	Italo-Abyssinian War
Korea	Military Train	Gun'yō ressha (軍用列車); Gun-yong-yeolcha (군용열차)	Gwang-je Seo	A Korean train conductor is involved in espionage on a Japanese military train
Japan	A Pay by the Wayside (Five Scouts)	Gonin no sekkôhei (五人の斥候兵)	Tomotaka Tasaka	Five Japanese Army soldiers on reconnaissance mission behind Chinese lines
Japan	The Road to Peace in the Orient	Tōyō heiwa no michi (東洋平和の道)	Shigeyoshi Suzuki	Chinese farmers overcame their distrust of Japan after being helped by Japanese soldiers
France	The Shanghai Drama	Le drame de Shanghaï	Georg Wilhelm Pabst	Japanese Black Dragon agents in Shanghai

== Films made during the Second World War ==
Note: Soviet films are in Russian and originate in the Russian SFSR, unless otherwise noted.

=== 1939 ===
Country	Main title (Alternative titles)	Original title (Original script)	Director	Battles, campaigns, events depicted
Italy	Battles in the Shadow ^{†}	Lotte nell'ombra	Domenico Gambino	Foreign spies steal the formula of a new explosive
United States	Confessions of a Nazi Spy		Anatole Litvak	Nazi spy ring in the United States
United States	Hitler, Beast of Berlin (Hell's Devils / Beasts of Berlin)		Sam Newfield	Drama. German anti-Hitler political prisoner
Hungary	Hungary's Revival	Magyar feltámadás	Jenő Csepreghy	Drama, romance. The film celebrates the recent Hungarian territorial gains following the Munich agreement and the First Vienna Award.
United Kingdom	The Lion Has Wings		Michael Powell, Adrian Brunel, Brian Desmond Hurst, Alexander Korda	RAF mobilization
Italy	The Little Adventurers	Piccoli naufraghi	Flavio Calzavara	Adventure. Twelve Italian boys embark on a merchantman ship to fight in the War of Ethiopia, but are shipwrecked on an island. Then they manage to take control of another merchantman smuggling weapons to Ethiopia.
Japan Empire	Mud and Soldiers	Tsuchi to heitai (土と兵隊)	Tomotaka Tasaka	Drama based on Ashihei Hino novel. Effect of war on Japanese soldiers during Sino-Japanese War
United Kingdom	Q Planes (Clouds Over Europe)		Tim Whelan, Arthur B. Woods	Thriller. Foreign spies suspected in disappearance of secret aircraft
United Kingdom	Secret Journey (Among Human Wolves)		John Baxter	Based on Charles Robert Dumas' short story. British secret service agent on mission
Japan Empire	Shanghai Landing Squad	Shanhai Rikusentai (上海陸戦隊)	Hisatora Kumagaya	Japanese Special Naval Landing Forces
Nazi Germany	Shoulder Arms	Das Gewehr über	Jürgen von Alten	German emigrant in Australia returns to his country for military service in the Army
United States	South of the Border		George Sherman	Action/Western. US Federal Agent on mission in Mexico to prevent German agents from gaining control of Mexican oil refineries and inciting revolution
Nazi Germany	Three Non-Coms ^{†}	Drei Unteroffiziere	Werner Hochbaum	Luftwaffe NCO's
United Kingdom	Traitor Spy (The Torso Murder Mystery)		Walter Summers	Mystery thriller based on T. C. H. Jacobs novel. German spy employed in anti-submarine patrol boat and torpedo factory
United States	Wings of the Navy		Lloyd Bacon	Drama. Experimental fighter for the US Navy

=== 1940 ===
Country	Main title (Alternative titles)	Original title (Original script)	Director	Battles, campaigns, events depicted
United States	Arise, My Love		Mitchell Leisen	Romantic comedy. Spanish Civil War through French capitulation, 1940
Nazi Germany	Attention! The Enemy Is Listening! ^{†}	Achtung! Feind hört mit!	Arthur Maria Rabenalt	Foreign spies in a German armaments factory
United Kingdom	The Big Blockade		Charles Frend	Economic blockade of Germany
Japan	The Blazing Heavens ^{†} (The Burning Sky / Flaming Sky)	Moyuru ōzora (燃ゆる大空)	Yutaka Abe	Action-drama. Imperial Japanese Army Air Service during Sino-Japanese War
Italy	The Cavalier from Kruja ^{†}	Il cavaliere di Kruja	Carlo Campogalliani	Adventure. An Italian journalist gets involved in the Albanian opposition to King Zog and is finally saved by the Italian invasion of Albania
United States	Comrade X		King Vidor	Spy drama. US journalist in the Soviet Union moonlights as spy.
United Kingdom	Convoy		Pen Tennyson	Battle of the Atlantic
Nazi Germany	Enemies ^{†}	Feinde	Viktor Tourjansky	Invasion of Poland justified by Polish persecution of ethnic Germans
United States	Foreign Correspondent		Alfred Hitchcock	Spy thriller. American reporter tries to expose spies in Britain on the eve of World War II.
United States	The Great Dictator		Charlie Chaplin	Satire. Dictator Adenoid Hynkel is replaced by identical Jew
United States	The Long Voyage Home		John Ford	Battle of the Atlantic
United States	The Man I Married (I Married a Nazi)		Irving Pichel	Drama. American woman's German husband develops Nazi sympathies
United Kingdom	Night Train to Munich (Gestapo)		Carol Reed	Mystery-thriller. Inventor and daughter kidnapped by Gestapo then rescued by British agent
United States	The Phantom Submarine		Charles Barton	Action-mystery. Journalist and US Navy frogman investigate U-boat terror
Nazi Germany	Request Concert	Wunschkonzert	Eduard von Borsody	Luftwaffe airmen fighting over Poland and then the Atlantic
United States	Ski Patrol		Lew Landers	Olympians oppose each other again in the Winter War
Japan	The Legend of Tank Commander Nishizumi	Nishizumi senshacho-den (西住戦車長伝)	Kōzaburō Yoshimura	Japanese tank commander fights in the Sino-Japanese War and dies in the Battle of Nanking
United Kingdom	Ten Days in Paris		Jeremy Brown	Comedy mystery.
United States	Waterloo Bridge		Mervyn LeRoy	Called-up British officer reminisces over World War I romance
United States	Women in War		John H. Auer	Action-drama. Allied nurses on pre-Dunkirk Battle of France front

=== 1941 ===
Country	Main title (Alternative titles)	Original title (Original script)	Director	Battles, campaigns, events depicted
Nazi Germany	Above All in the World ^{†}	Über alles in der Welt	Karl Ritter	German civilians abroad get involved in the beginning of World War II
United States	All Through the Night		Vincent Sherman	Lighthearted mystery-thriller. Nazi Fifth Columnists
Nazi Germany	Annelie	Annelie	Josef von Báky	Heroic German mother during war
Nazi Germany	Bomber Wing Lützow	Kampfgeschwader Lützow	Hans Bertram	A bomber crew takes part in invasion of Poland and attacks on British shipping
United States	Buck Privates		Arthur Lubin	Comedy. Abbott and Costello enlist in the Army
United States	Caught in the Draft		David Butler	Comedy. Bob Hope gets drafted
United States	Confirm or Deny		Archie Mayo, Fritz Lang (uncredited)	Comedy-drama. London Blitz
United Kingdom	Cottage to Let (Bombsight Stolen)		Anthony Asquith	Lighthearted mystery. Kidnapping of bombsight inventor from Scotland by Nazi agents
United States	Dangerously They Live		Robert Florey	Nazi agents in US pursue Allied spy with secret of U-boat fleet off US coast
United Kingdom	Dangerous Moonlight		Brian Desmond Hurst	The Battle of Britain
United States	Dive Bomber		Michael Curtiz	Flight surgeons and medical flight research on pilots in Pacific
Hungary	Europe Doesn't Answer ^{†}	Európa nem válaszol	Géza von Radványi	Spies on board of a transatlantic at the beginning of World War 2
United Kingdom	49th Parallel (The Invaders)		Michael Powell	Battle of the St. Lawrence and survivors of a sunken U-boat in Hudson Bay trek across Canada
United Kingdom	Freedom Radio		Anthony Asquith	German Resistance
Soviet Union	The Girl from Leningrad	Frontovye podrugi (Фронтовые подруги)	Viktor Eisymont	Russian woman volunteers as nurse on Finnish Front where she becomes involved with wounded soldiers; remade in US as Three Russian Girls
Nazi Germany	Goodbye, Franziska	Auf Wiedersehn, Franziska!	Helmut Käutner	A German globetrotting reporter is drafted into a Wehrmacht Propagandakompanie
United States	Great Guns		Monty Banks	Comedy. Laurel and Hardy are drafted into the US Army
Nazi Germany	Hallgarten's Reconnaissance Patrol	Spähtrupp Hallgarten	Herbert B. Fredersdorf	Two German soldiers in the Norwegian Campaign
Nazi Germany	Homecoming	Heimkehr	Gustav Ucicky	Drama. Poles persecute ethnic Germans
United States	International Lady		Tim Whelan	Spy drama.
Nazi Germany	In the Eye of the Storm	Menschen im Sturm	Fritz Peter Buch	Drama. Serbs persecute ethnic Germans
Soviet Union	In the Rear of the Enemy	V tylu vraga (В тылу врага)	Yevgeni Shneider	Comedy. Finnish War
United States	Man Hunt		Fritz Lang	Prewar assassination attempt on Hitler
Italy	Men on the Sea Floor	Uomini sul fondo	Francesco De Robertis	The crew of an Italian submarine try to repair their damaged ship trapped on the sea bottom
United States	Parachute Battalion		Leslie Goodwins	Three men join a parachute battalion
United Kingdom	Pimpernel Smith		Leslie Howard	The Scarlet Pimpernel updated
Japan	Prayer to Mother Earth ^{†}	Daichi ni inoru (大地に祈る)	Takeo Murata	Japanese military nurses in China
United Kingdom	Ships with Wings		Sergei Nolbandov	Battle of Taranto
Nazi Germany	Six Days of Leave ^{†}	Sechs Tage Heimaturlaub	Jürgen von Alten	German soldiers on leave
Nazi Germany	Soldiers of Tomorrow ^{†}	Soldaten von morgen	Alfred Weidenmann	Hitler Youth
United States	Sundown		Henry Hathaway	The North African Campaign
Nazi Germany	U-Boat, Course West!	U-Boote westwärts	Günther Rittau	U-boats in the Battle of the Atlantic
United States	Underground		Vincent Sherman	German Resistance
Korea	Volunteer ^{†}	Shiganhei (志願兵); Chiwŏnbyŏng (지원병)	Seok-yeong Ahn	Korean volunteers in the Japanese Army
Vichy France	The Well-Digger's Daughter	La fille du puisatier	Marcel Pagnol	A girl becomes pregnant by a military pilot, then shot down behind German lines during the Battle of France
Italy	The White Ship	La nave bianca	Francesco De Robertis, Roberto Rossellini	Sailors on a hospital ship after wounds in battle (depicted by footage filmed during the Battle of Calabria and the Battle of Cape Spartivento)
United States	A Yank in the RAF		Henry King	American volunteers in the RAF
Korea	You and Me ^{†}	Kimi to boku (君と僕); Nŏ wa na (너와 나)	"Eitaro Hinatsu" (Hae Yeong), Tomotaka Tasaka	Korean volunteer in the Japanese Army marries a Japanese woman

=== 1942 ===
Country	Main title (Alternative titles)	Original title (Original script)	Director	Battles, campaigns, events depicted
Nazi Germany	5 June	Der 5. Juni	Fritz Kirchhoff	Battle of France
United States	Across the Pacific		John Huston, Vincent Sherman	Spy drama. Japanese plot against the Panama Canal
Italy	Alpha Tau! ^{†}	Alfa Tau!	Francesco De Robertis	Italian submarine warfare in Mediterranean Theatre
United States	Atlantic Convoy		Lew Landers	Allied naval operations based in Iceland against U-boats in Atlantic
Japan	The Battle of Hong Kong	Honkon kōryaku: Eikoku kuzururu no hi (香港攻略 英国崩るゝの日)	Shigeo Tanaka	Battle of Hong Kong
Italy	Bengasi	Bengasi (Bengasi anno '41)	Augusto Genina	Italian resistance to the British occupation of Benghazi in 1941
United States	Black Dragons		William Nigh	Japan's Black Dragon Society, in collaboration with Nazis, recruits a mad scientist to create likenesses of Western leaders
United States	The Bugle Sounds		S. Sylvan Simon	Cavalry and tank warfare
United States	Captains of the Clouds		Michael Curtiz	Canadian bush pilots in the British Commonwealth Air Training Plan
United States	Casablanca		Michael Curtiz	1943 Best picture romantic-thriller set in Vichy-controlled Morocco
United States	Commandos Strike at Dawn		John Farrow	Norwegian resistance
United States	The Dawn Express		Albert Herman	A Nazi spy ring is after a chemical formula
United Kingdom	The Day Will Dawn (The Avengers)		Harold French	Norwegian resistance
United States	Desperate Journey		Raoul Walsh	RAF aircrew escape from Germany through occupied Netherlands
Italy	Document Z-3	Documento Z-3	Alfredo Guarini	Italian agents in Yugoslavia in the last days before the invasion
United States	Eagle Squadron		Arthur Lubin	Eagle Squadron, American volunteers in the RAF during the Battle of Britain
Soviet Union (Georgian SSR)	Elusive Ian ^{†}	Uchinari Jani (Georgian please) (in Georgian); Neulovimyy Yan (Неуловимый Ян) (in Russian)	Isidor Annensky, Vladimir Petrov	Confrontation between Czechoslovak patriots and German fascists
Japan	Fear of the Fifth Column	Daigoretsu no kyofu (第五列的恐怖)	Hiroyuki Yamamoto	British and Chinese spies try to steal the projects of a Japanese airplane engine
United Kingdom	The First of the Few (Spitfire)		Leslie Howard	Development of the Spitfire
United States; United Kingdom	Flying Fortress		Walter Forde	B-17 bombers
United States	Flying Tigers		David Miller	American Volunteer Group in the Sino-Japanese War
United Kingdom	The Foreman Went to France		Charles Frend	Battle of France
Nazi Germany	Front Theater ^{†}	Fronttheater	Arthur Maria Rabenalt	Battle of Greece
Japan	General, Staff Officer and Soldiers ^{†}	Shōgun to sanbō to hei (将軍と参謀と兵)	Taguchi Satoshi	Sino-Japanese war
Italy	Giarabub	Giarabub	Goffredo Alessandrini	The Siege of Giarabub in 1941
Nazi Germany	The Great Love	Die große Liebe	Rolf Hansen	War between Nazi Germany and USSR
Korea	Here We Go! ^{†}	Warera imazo yuku (吾等今ぞ征く); Nanŭn kanda (나는 간다)	Ki-chae Park	Korean volunteers in Japanese Army
United States	Hillbilly Blitzkrieg		Roy Mack	Nazi spies steal rocket formula in the US
United States	Hitler – Dead or Alive		Nick Grinde	Three American gangsters set out to collect the million-dollar reward for bringing Hitler to justice.
United Kingdom	In Which We Serve		Noël Coward, David Lean	Based on the sinking of HMS Kelly
United States	Joan of Paris		Robert Stevenson	Downed RAF aircrew meets the French Resistance
United States	Jungle Siren		Sam Newfield	Free French, with two Americans, sent to African village to build an airfield
United Kingdom	King Arthur Was a Gentleman		Marcel Varnel	Comedy, Musical, Romance. Soldier fantasizes about King Arthur as he takes on the Wehrmacht
United States	Lady from Chungking		William Nigh	Sino-Japanese War
United Kingdom	Lady from Lisbon		Leslie S. Hiscott	Farce. Nazi agents, Allied counterspies and several copies of the Mona Lisa
United States	Let's Get Tough!		Wallace Fox	Juvenile delinquents battle Black Dragon Society saboteurs in New York
Italy	MAS	MAS	Romolo Marcellini	MAS (Italian torpedo boat)
United States	Mrs. Miniver		William Wyler	1942 Best picture depicting the British home front
United States	The Navy Comes Through		A. Edward Sutherland	Battle of the Atlantic
United Kingdom	The Next of Kin		Thorold Dickinson	Message that careless talk costs lives, and fictional commando raid
Italy; Romania	Odessa in Flames	Odessa in fiamme (in Italian), Odessa în flăcări (in Romanian)	Carmine Gallone	Battle of Odessa, 1941
United Kingdom	One of Our Aircraft Is Missing		Michael Powell, Emeric Pressburger	Allied aircrew escape from the occupied Netherlands
United States	Pacific Rendezvous		George Sidney	Spy drama. Cryptography in the Pacific War
Japan	Patriotic Flowers	Aikoku no hana (愛國の花)	Keisuke Sasaki	Japanese military nurses
United States	The Phantom Plainsmen		John English	"The Three Mesquiteers" battle Nazi agents on a Western ranch
United States	The Pied Piper		Irving Pichel	Drama based on Nevil Shute novel. Holidaymaker rescues French children, 1940
Italy	A Pilot Returns	Un pilota ritorna	Roberto Rossellini	Greco-Italian War
United States	Private Buckaroo		Edward F. Cline	Musical.
Nazi Germany	The Red Terror	GPU	Karl Ritter	GPU's plots in Rotterdam are foiled by the German occupation
United States	Reunion in France		Jules Dassin	French Resistance helps a downed US pilot
United Kingdom	Sabotage at Sea		Leslie S. Hiscott	
United States	Saboteur		Alfred Hitchcock	Airplane factory worker falsely accused of sabotage
United States	Seven Days' Leave		Tim Whelan	Musical comedy. Soldier on leave must marry to inherit
United States	Sherlock Holmes and the Secret Weapon		Roy William Neill	Sherlock Holmes vs Nazi agents and Professor Moriarty
United States	Sherlock Holmes and the Voice of Terror		John Rawlins	Sherlock Holmes vs. Nazi saboteurs
United States	Somewhere I'll Find You		Wesley Ruggles	War correspondents in China and Pacific
Japan	The Spy Isn't Dead Yet	Kanchō imada shisezu (間諜未だ死せず)	Kōzaburō Yoshimura	Chinese and American spies in Japan
United States	Stand by for Action		Robert Z. Leonard	US Navy in the Pacific War
Nazi Germany	Stukas	Stukas	Karl Ritter	German dive bomber, the Stuka
United States	They Raid by Night		Spencer Gordon Bennet	Commando raids in occupied Norway
Italy	The Three Pilots	I tre aquilotti	Mario Mattoli	Three young pilots of the Regia Aeronautica
United States	To Be Or Not To Be		Ernst Lubitsch	Occupied Warsaw, and Polish air squadron in London
United States	To the Shores of Tripoli		H. Bruce Humberstone	
Japan	A Triumph of Wings	Tsubasa no gaika (翼の凱歌)	Satsuo Yamamoto	Two young Japanese become pilots of the Army Air Service
Nazi Germany	Two in a Big City	Zwei in einer großen Stadt	Volker von Collande	Luftwaffe pilot meets a nurse while on leave in Berlin
United States	Wake Island		John Farrow	Battle of Wake Island
Japan	The War at Sea from Hawaii to Malaya	Hawai Marē oki kaisen (ハワイまれ沖回線)	Kajiro Yamamoto	Attack on Pearl Harbor and Malayan Campaign
United Kingdom	Went the Day Well?		Alberto Cavalcanti	Fictional German invasion of England (see Operation Sea Lion)
United States	A Yank in Libya		Albert Herman	Journalist exposes Nazis trying to start an Arab revolt in North Africa
United States	A Yank on the Burma Road		George B. Seitz	Burma Road
United States	Yankee Doodle Dandy		Michael Curtiz	George M. Cohan

=== 1943 ===
Country	Main title (Alternative titles)	Original title (Original script)	Director	Battles, campaigns, events depicted
United States	Above Suspicion		Richard Thorpe	Honeymooners spy on the Nazis
United States	Action in the North Atlantic		Lloyd Bacon	The Battle of the Atlantic
United Kingdom	The Adventures of Tartu (Sabotage Agent)		Harold S. Bucquet	British spy posing as Romanian Iron Guard officer aids Czech partisans
United States	Aerial Gunner		William H. Pine	The B-34 Ventura in the Pacific
United States	Air Force		Howard Hawks	B-17 bombers in the Battle of the Philippines
Japan	The Air Raid by Enemy Aircraft ^{†}	Tekki raishū (敵機空襲)	Hiromasa Nomura	Air war over Japan
United States	Air Raid Wardens		Edward Sedgwick	Laurel and Hardy try to stop Nazi spies in the USA
Japan	All-out Attack on Singapore ^{†}	Shingapōru sōkōgeki (シンガポール総攻撃)	Koji Shima	Japanese conquest of Singapore
United States	Background to Danger		Raoul Walsh	Intrigue involving Nazis in neutral Turkey
United States	Bataan		Tay Garnett	The Battle of Bataan, Philippines
United States	Behind the Rising Sun		Edward Dmytryk	
United Kingdom	The Bells Go Down		Basil Dearden	Auxiliary Fire Service during the Blitz
United States	Bombardier		Richard Wallace	B-17 bomber crewmen in the Pacific
United States	Bomber's Moon		Edward Ludwig, Harold D. Schuster	
United States	Bombs Over Burma		Joseph H. Lewis	
United States	The Boy from Stalingrad		Sidney Salkow	Russian children resisting Nazi forces at the Battle of Stalingrad
United States	Chetniks! The Fighting Guerrillas		Louis King	Chetniks – Yugoslav guerrillas under General Draza Mihailovich
United States	China		John Farrow	
United States	Corregidor		William Nigh	The Battle of Corregidor, Philippines
United States	Corvette K-225		Richard Rosson, Howard Hawks	The Battle of the Atlantic, RCN corvette
United States	Crash Dive		Archie Mayo	USN submarine in the North Atlantic
Nazi Germany	The Crew of the Dora	Besatzung Dora	Karl Ritter	The crew of a Ju 88 bomber is forced to land in the desert and is saved by an Italian SM.79
United States	The Cross of Lorraine		Tay Garnett	French Resistance
United States	Cry 'Havoc'		Richard Thorpe	Drama based on Allan Kenward play. Army nurses on Bataan work with civilians during the Battle of the Philippines (1941-42)
United States	Destination Tokyo		Delmer Daves	USN submarine patrol for the Doolittle Raid
United States	Destroyer		William A. Seiter	Fictional story of the destroyer USS John Paul Jones from commissioning
United States	Edge of Darkness		Lewis Milestone	The Norwegian resistance movement
Korea	Figure of Youth ^{†}	Wakaki sugata (若き姿); Chŏlmŭn mosŭp (젊은 모습)	Shirō Toyoda	Korean volunteers in Japanese Army
United Kingdom	Fires Were Started (I Was a Fireman)		Humphrey Jennings	Docudrama. Firemen during the Blitz
United States	First Comes Courage		Dorothy Arzner	Norwegian resistance
United States	Five Graves to Cairo		Billy Wilder	Spy drama set after the fall of Tobruk in the North African Campaign depicting an English soldiers interactions with Erwin Rommel
United Kingdom	The Flemish Farm		Jeffrey Dell	Commando raids in occupied Belgium
United States	Gangway for Tomorrow		John H. Auer	Anthology film. Five stories of American defense workers on way to work at munitions factory
United States	Ghosts on the Loose		William Beaudine	Glimpy's newlywed sister and her husband buy a house next door to a nest of Nazi spies, but the East Side foil the Nazis' evil plot
United States	G-Men vs the Black Dragon (serial)		Spencer Gordon Bennet, William Witney, William J. O'Sullivan	
Nazi Germany	The Golden Spider ^{†}	Die goldene Spinne	Erich Engels	Soviet spies try to discover the secrets of a new German tank
United States	Guadalcanal Diary		Lewis Seiler	US Marines in Guadalcanal Campaign
United States	Gung Ho!: The Story of Carlson's Makin Island Raiders		Ray Enright	Marine Raiders in the Central Pacific
United States	Hangmen Also Die!		Fritz Lang	Operation Anthropoid, the assassination of Reinhard Heydrich by the Czech resistance
Soviet Union (Georgian SSR)	He Would Come Back	Is kidev dabrundeba (Georgian please) (in Georgian); On eshchyo vernyotsa (Он ещё вернётся) (in Russian)	Diomide Antadze, Nikoloz Shengelaia	Kakhetian village and Battle of the Caucasus
United States	Hitler's Madman (Hitler's Hangman)		Douglas Sirk	Operation Anthropoid, assassination of Nazi Reinhard Heydrich and revenge taken by the Germans
United States	Immortal Sergeant		John M. Stahl	British and Canadian troops in the North Africa Campaign
United States	Journey Into Fear		Norman Foster, Orson Welles (uncredited)	Spy drama based on Eric Ambler novel. An American engineer, in neutral Turkey to help upgrade the Turkish navy, that is targeted by Nazi agents
Italy	Letters to the Second Lieutenant ^{†}	Lettere al sottotenente	Goffredo Alessandrini	Comedy. A girl writes letters to a young officer, but she does not want to meet him because she feels ugly
United Kingdom	The Life and Death of Colonel Blimp		Michael Powell, Emeric Pressburger	The Home Guard
Japan	The Man from Chungking	Jūkei kara kita otoko (重慶から来た男)	Hiroyuki Yamamoto	Enemy agents try to sabotage Japanese war production
Italy	The Man with a Cross	L'uomo della croce	Roberto Rossellini	A chaplain of the Italian Expeditionary Corps in Russia
Italy	Men of the Mountain	Quelli della montagna	Aldo Vergano	Alpini against France
United Kingdom	Millions Like Us		Frank Launder, Sidney Gilliat	The home front
United States	Minesweeper		William Berke	
United States	Mission to Moscow		Michael Curtiz	A biopic of Ambassador Joseph E. Davies.
United States	The Moon Is Down		Irving Pichel	Resistance
United States	The More the Merrier		George Stevens	Comedy. Soldier on American home front with housing shortage
Japan	Navy ^{†}	Kaigun (海軍)	Tomotaka Tasaka	Attack on Pearl Harbor by Japanese midget submarines
United States	Night Plane from Chungking		Ralph Murphy	
United States	Northern Pursuit		Raoul Walsh	Royal Canadian Mounted Police uncover Nazi plot against Allied war effort to cripple transatlantic shipping of war materials
United States	The North Star (Armored Attack)		Lewis Milestone	Guerrilla warfare on the Eastern Front
Vichy France	Occult Forces	Forces occultes	"Paul Riche"	Freemasons work with Jews to bring France into the war
Japan	On the Eve of War	Kaisen no zenya (开战前夜)	Kōzaburō Yoshimura	Kempeitai fights American spies in Japan
Japan	Our Planes Fly South ^{†}	Aiki minami e tobu (愛機南へ飛ぶ)	Yasushi Sasaki	The young pilot of a recon plane is shot down but survives
Italy	People of the Air ^{†}	Gente dell'aria	Esodo Pratelli	Two brothers become pilots of the Regia Aeronautica
United States	Pilot #5		George Sidney	Battle of the Java Sea
United States	Rookies in Burma		Leslie Goodwins	The Burma Campaign
United States	Sahara		Zoltan Korda	Allied troops at the Second Battle of El Alamein
United States	Salute to the Marines		S. Sylvan Simon	The Battle of the Philippines
United States	Secret Service in Darkest Africa (serial)		Spencer Gordon Bennet	
Italy	Spies Among the Propellers ^{†}	Spie tra le eliche	Ignazio Ferronetti	An Italian detective discovers enemy agents sabotaging a warplanes factory
United States	Sherlock Holmes in Washington		Roy William Neill	Sherlock Holmes travels to Washington D.C. in order to prevent a secret document that must be delivered to Congress from falling into Nazi hands.
United Kingdom	The Silver Fleet		Vernon Sewell, Gordon Wellesley	Dutch resistance
United States	So Proudly We Hail!		Mark Sandrich	Army nurses and the Battle of the Philippines (1941-42)
Italy	Special Correspondents ^{†}	Inviati speciali	Romolo Marcellini	An Italian journalist discovers an enemy female agent in the Spanish Civil War and then in Egypt during World War II
Korea	Straits of Chosun^{†}	Chōsen Kaikyō (朝鮮海峡); Joseonhaehyeob (조선해협)	Ki-chae Park	Korean man volunteers to serve in the Japanese Army
United States	The Strange Death of Adolf Hitler		James P. Hogan	Man with likeness for Adolf Hitler plans his assassination takeover of his identity
Japan	Suicide Squad at the Watchtower ^{†}	Bōrō no kesshitai (望楼の決死隊)	Tadashi Imai	Japanese, Koreans and Chinese cooperate against bandits near the Yalu river
United States	Tarzan Triumphs		Wilhelm Thiele	German paratroopers invade Central Africa
United States	This Land Is Mine		Jean Renoir	French Resistance
Italy	The Three-hundred of the Seventh ^{†}	I trecento della Settima	Mario Baffico	Alpini on the Greek front
United States	Thousands Cheer		George Sidney	Musical comedy romance. Soldier wants to be airman
United States	Three Russian Girls		Henry S. Kesler, Fyodor Otsep	The Eastern Front
United States	Tiger Fangs		Sam Newfield	Thriller. Nazis make man-eaters of Malayan tigers
Japan	The Tiger of Malaya ^{†}	Marai no Tora (マライの虎)	Koga Masato	The story of Japanese secret agent Tani Yutaka, known as "Harimau" (Malay word for "Tiger")
United States	Tonight We Raid Calais		John Brahm	
Japan	Toward the Decisive Battle in the Sky ^{†}	Kessen no ōzora e (決戦の大空へ)	Kunio Watanabe	Training of young boys in the Yokaren, a program feeding new pilots into the Japanese Army and Navy
Italy	The Train with the Cross ^{†}	Il treno crociato	Carlo Campogalliani	Italian hospital-train on the Russian front
United Kingdom	Undercover (Underground Guerrillas)		Sergei Nolbandov	Yugoslav guerrillas in Serbia
United States	Watch on the Rhine		Herman Shumlin	Nazi agents pursue a German freedom-fighter and his family to Washington
United Kingdom	We Dive at Dawn		Anthony Asquith	Submarine warfare during the Battle of the Atlantic
United States	We've Never Been Licked (Texas to Tokyo / Fighting Command)		John Rawlins	Japanese spies at Texas A&M University
United States	Wings Over the Pacific		Phil Rosen	Luftwaffe and USAAF pilot meet in the South Pacific

=== 1944 ===
Country	Main title (Alternative titles)	Original title (Original script)	Director	Battles, campaigns, events depicted
United States	Action in Arabia		Léonide Moguy	Intrigue involving Nazis in Damascus, Syria
United States	Address Unknown		William Cameron Menzies	German-American returns to Germany with his family and becomes a Nazi, cutting off contact with his Jewish friend in America
Italy	Air Base ^{†}	Aeroporto	Piero Costa	Italian aviators flying for the Regia Aeronautica in the summer of 1943 and then, after the armistice, for the Aeronautica Nazionale Repubblicana
Japan	Battle Troop	Raigekitai shutsudo (来撃退しゅつど)	Kajirō Yamamoto	Torpedo bomber squadron at war
United Kingdom	Bees in Paradise		Val Guest	Musical comedy. Allied bomber crashes on mysterious Atlantic island
Japan	Colonel Kato's Falcon Squadron (Colonel Kato's Flying Squadron)	Kato hayabusa sento-tai (過渡ハヤブサ線と歌い)	Kajiro Yamamoto	
United States	The Conspirators		Jean Negulesco	Spy drama
Japan	The Daily Battle	Nichijō no tatakai (日常の戦い)	Yasujirō Shimazu	Japanese teacher of English language serves as an Army interpreter in South-East Asia
Philippines	Dawn of Freedom (Fire on That Flag!)	Liwayway ng kalayaan(in Tagalog); Ano hata o ute (あの旗を撃て)	Gerardo de León, Yutaka Abe	Japan–Philippines relations during Japanese occupation of the Philippines
United States	Days of Glory		Jacques Tourneur	Soviet partisans
Japan	The Decisive Battle	Kessen (決戦)	Kōzaburō Yoshimura	Japanese war production
Nazi Germany	The Degenhardts	Die Degenhardts	Werner Klingler	Bombing of Lübeck on 28 March 1942
United States	Dragon Seed		Harold S. Bucquet, Jack Conway	The Sino-Japanese War
Argentina	End of the Night	El Fin de la Noche	Libertad Lamarque; Homero Cárpena	A female Argentine tango singer in occupied France gets romantically involved with a Resistance member
United States	The Eve of St. Mark		John M. Stahl	Philippines campaign (1941–1942)
Italy	Everyday Is Sunday ^{†}	Ogni giorno è domenica	Mario Baffico	An Italian soldier is wounded on the Greek front and his leg is amputated, but when he returns home his girlfriend still loves him
Sweden	Excellency ^{†}	Excellensen	Hasse Ekman	Austrian poet opposes Nazism and therefore is imprisoned in a concentration camp
Japan	Field Army Band ^{†}	Yasen gungakutai (野戦軍楽隊)	Masahiro Makino	Music band of the Imperial Japanese Army in an occupied Chinese village
United States	The Fighting Seabees		Edward Ludwig	US Navy Seabees in the Pacific War
United States	The Fighting Sullivans (The Sullivans)		Lloyd Bacon	The Sullivan brothers
United States	Four Jills in a Jeep		William A. Seiter	Female stars of USO shows
United States	Going My Way		Leo McCarey	Ted Haines Jr. fights in Africa
United States	Hail the Conquering Hero		Preston Sturges	Comedy. Civilian with medical discharge befriends Marines
Japan	Hot Wind ^{†}	Neppū (熱風)	Satsuo Yamamoto	War production in a Japanese steel foundry
United States	The Hour Before the Dawn		Frank Tuttle	Drama based on W. Somerset Maugham novel. Austrian refugee is Nazi spy preparing for German invasion of England
Japan	The Human Bullet Volunteer Corps	Nikudan teishintai (肉弾挺身隊)	Shigeo Tanaka	Guadalcanal Campaign
Hungary	Hungarian Eagles	Magyar sasok	István László	Wartime film about the Hungarian Air Force.
United States	The Impostor	L'Imposteur	Julien Duvivier	Condemned French killer escapes and joins Free French in Chad
United States	In the Meantime, Darling		Otto Preminger	Stateside military housing
Sweden	The Invisible Wall ^{†}	Den osynliga muren	Gustaf Molander	In an unnamed country occupied by Nazis a girl becomes indirectly involved in a terrorist attack and helps Jews to escape
Soviet Union	Jurgais pari	Jurgais pari (ჯურღაის ფარი) (in Georgian) (Щит Джургая) (in Russian)	Siko Dolidze, Davit Rondeli	
United States	Ladies Courageous		John Rawlins	Women's Auxiliary Ferrying Squadron
United States	Lifeboat		Alfred Hitchcock	Drama. Survivors adrift in Battle of the Atlantic
Sweden	Live Dangerously	Lev farligt	Lauritz Falk	Norwegian resistance movement
Soviet Union	Malakhov Hill	Malakhov kurgan (Малахов курган)	Iosif Kheifits, Aleksandr Zarkhi	Siege of Sevastopol
United States	Marine Raiders		Harold D. Schuster	Battle of Edson's Ridge during Battle of Guadalcanal, then Australian R&R
United States	Marriage Is a Private Affair		Robert Z. Leonard	
United States	Ministry of Fear		Fritz Lang	The Blitz
United States	The Master Race		Herbert J. Biberman	
United States	The Miracle of Morgan's Creek		Preston Sturges	Comedy. Young woman wants big send-off for departing soldiers
Japan	Mr. Sailor ^{†}	Suihei-san (水兵さん)	Kenkichi Hara	
Korea	Mr. Soldier ^{†}	Heitai-san (兵隊さん); Byeongjeongnim (병정님)	Han-jun Bang	Young Korean men conscripted into the Japanese Army
United States	Mr. Winkle Goes to War		Alfred E. Green	
Japan	The Most Beautiful	Ichiban utsukushiku (一番美しく)	Akira Kurosawa	Japanese female workers in a war production factory
United States	The Navy Way		William A. Berke	
United States	Passage to Marseille		Michael Curtiz	
United States	Passport to Destiny		Ray McCarey	Charwoman travels to Germany to assassinate Hitler
United States	The Purple Heart		Lewis Milestone	POWs captured during Doolittle Raid
Soviet Union	Rainbow	Raduga (Радуга)	Mark Donskoy	Drama based on Wanda Wasilewska novel.
Australia	The Rats of Tobruk (The Fighting Rats of Tobruk)		Charles Chauvel	Siege of Tobruk
United States	Rosie the Riveter		Joseph Santley	Musical.
Japan	Santarō Pitches In ^{†}	Santarō gambaru (三太郎頑張る)	Hiromasa Nomura	Santarō, a Japanese boy, works in a factory producing Zero fighters
United States	See Here, Private Hargrove		Wesley Ruggles	Comedy based on Marion Hargrove book. US Army training at Fort Bragg
United States	Sergeant Mike		Henry Levin	Dog handler in the Pacific War
United States	Since You Went Away		John Cromwell	Home front
Japan	Sinking the Unsinkable ^{†}	Fuchinkan gekichin (不沈艦撃沈)	Masahiro Makino	Japanese workers in a factory increase their production of aerial torpedoes for the Japanese Navy after the sinking of the Prince of Wales
United States	Song of Russia		Gregory Ratoff	
United States	The Story of Dr. Wassell		Cecil B. DeMille	Navy doctor in the Battle of Java
Italy	Stronghold ^{†}	Caposaldo	Andrea Miano	Italian and German soldiers of the Army Group Liguria fighting against partisans
United States	Sunday Dinner for a Soldier		Lloyd Bacon	Drama. Home front
United States	Tampico		Lothar Mendes	U-boat operations in Gulf of Mexico with sinking of Mexican oil tankers make Mexico an Allied nation
United States	Thirty Seconds Over Tokyo		Mervyn LeRoy	Doolittle Raid
United States	Till We Meet Again		Frank Borzage	
United States	To Have and Have Not		Howard Hawks	
United States	Two-Man Submarine		Lew Landers	
United Kingdom	2,000 Women (Two Thousand Women / House of 1,000 Women)		Frank Launder	Internment camps for British women in occupied France
United States	U-Boat Prisoner (Dangerous Mists)		Lew Landers	Rescued seaman considered German agent amidst submarine warfare
United States	Uncertain Glory		Raoul Walsh	Condemned French killer escapes and aids Resistance
United States	Waterfront		Steve Sekely	
United Kingdom	The Immortal Battalion	The Way Ahead	Carol Reed	Conscripts are trained and fight in the North African Campaign
United States	The White Cliffs of Dover		Clarence Brown	
Italy; Romania	The White Squadron	Squadriglia bianca (in Italian); Escadrila albă (in Romanian)	Ion Sava	Royal Romanian Air Force squadron of hospital airplanes piloted only by women
United States	Wing and a Prayer (The Story of Carrier X)		Henry Hathaway	Battle of Midway
United States	Winged Victory		George Cukor	Training of US Army Air Forces
Nazi Germany	Young Eagles	Junge Adler	Alfred Weidenmann	Young boy in a factory of warplanes

=== 1945 ===
Country	Main title (Alternative titles)	Original title (Original script)	Director	Battles, campaigns, events depicted
United States	Back to Bataan		Edward Dmytryk	Raid at Cabanatuan, Battle of Bataan, guerrilla warfare in the Philippines, Battle of Leyte
Japan	Believe That Others Will Follow ^{†}	Ato ni tsuzuku o shinzu (後に続くを信ず)	Kunio Watanabe	The actions of company commander Tōichi Wakabayashi in China, Singapore and Guadalcanal
United States	Blood on the Sun		Frank Lloyd	Journalist persecuted by Japanese militarist government
British India	Queen of Burma ^{†}	Burma Rani	T. R. Sundaram	An Indian spy ring in Japanese-occupied Burma
United States	China's Little Devils		Monta Bell	A group of Chinese children assist downed American pilots escape the Japanese
United States	Christmas in Connecticut		Peter Godfrey	Comedy. A food columnist hosts a coming-home banquet for a war hero.
United States	Cornered		Edward Dmytryk	Ex-Nazis in Argentina
United States	Counter-Attack		Zoltan Korda	Eastern Front
Mexico	Escuadrón 201	Escuadrón 201	Jaime Salvador	201st Air Fighter Squadron of the Fuerza Aérea Expedicionaria Mexicana in the Battle of Luzon and Philippines Campaign
United States	First Yank Into Tokyo		Gordon Douglas	American agent has to rescue a scientist bearing valuable secrets about the atomic bomb.
Japan	Girls of the Air Base ^{†}	Otome no iru kichi (乙女のゐる基地)	Yasushi Sasaki	Girl mechanics work in a Kamikaze air base
United States	God Is My Co-Pilot		Robert Florey	Drama based on Robert Lee Scott, Jr. book. Flying Tigers
United States	The House on 92nd Street		Henry Hathaway	Docudrama. Duquesne Spy Ring
United States	Identity Unknown		Walter Colmes	A soldier suffering from amnesia is the only survivor of four infantrymen. When the four men's dog tags were found the Army does not know which of the four the surviving soldier is. The soldier tries to discover his true identity by visiting the homes of the four different soldiers.
Denmark	The Invisible Army	Den usynlige hær	Johan Jacobsen	Danish partisan
United States	Keep Your Powder Dry		Edward Buzzell	Women's Army Corps
Switzerland	The Last Chance	Die letzte Chance	Leopold Lindtberg	Escaping Nazi prison train in Italy, an American and a British soldier head for Switzerland
Japan	The Last Visit Home ^{†}	Saigo no kikyō (最後の桔梗)	Shigeo Tanaka; Misao Yoshimura	Kamikaze
Nazi Germany	Life Goes On	Das Leben geht weiter	Wolfgang Liebeneiner	German home front V-2 rockets will turn the tide of war in Germany's favour
Korea	Love and the Vow ^{†}	Ai to chikai (愛と誓ひ); Sarang kwa maengsŏ (사랑과 맹서)	Tadashi Imai; In-kyu Ch'oe	Korean orphan living with Japanese parents volunteers in a Kamikaze unit
Japan	Momotaro's Divine Sea Warriors	Momotaro no koumi no senshi (百田炉の香味の戦士)	Mitsuyo Seo	Anime. Japanese folk hero and animal buddies drive British soldiers off an island
United States	Objective, Burma!		Raoul Walsh	Burma Campaign
United States	Out of the Depths		D. Ross Lederman	Fictional rogue Japanese resistance during the USS Missouri surrender ceremony
United States	Pride of the Marines		Delmer Daves	Battle of Guadalcanal and civilian readjustment
United States	Prison Ship		Arthur Dreifuss	Revolt of American POWs aboard a Japanese ship
Denmark	The Red Meadows	De røde enge	Bodil Ipsen, Lau Lauritzen Jr.	Young Danish saboteur
Italy	Rome, Open City	Roma città aperta	Roberto Rossellini	Italian resistance in German-occupied Rome
United States	Samurai		Raymond Cannon	Japanese spy in California
United States	Son of Lassie		S. Sylvan Simon	Lassie stows away on an RAF flight to German occupation of Norway that gets shot down and hunted by Nazis
Italy	The Song of Life^{†}	Il canto della vita	Carmine Gallone	Italian partisan hiding in the countryside
Japan	Spy Ship "Sea Rose"	Kanchō Umi no bara (間諜海の薔薇)	Teinosuke Kinugasa	Kempeitai discover an American spy ring and help sinking the enemy spy-submarine Sea Rose
United States	The Story of GI Joe		William A. Wellman	Journalist Ernie Pyle with Company C, 18th Infantry in the North African Campaign and the Battle of Monte Cassino
United States	They Were Expendable		John Ford	PT boats in the Battle of the Philippines (1941-42)
United States	This Man's Navy		William A. Wellman	Adventure. US Navy airships
Italy	The Timeless House ^{†}	La casa senza tempo	Andrea Forzano	Enemy spies try to steal the blueprints of a new airplane
United States	Too Young to Know		Frederick De Cordova	War in the South Pacific separates young couple
Italy	Two Anonymous Letters	Due lettere anonime	Mario Camerini	Italian resistance and collaboration in German-occupied Rome
United States	A Walk in the Sun		Lewis Milestone	Invasion of Salerno
United Kingdom	The Way to the Stars		Anthony Asquith	RAF and USAAF bomber crews stationed in England
United States	What Next, Corporal Hargrove?		Richard Thorpe	Comedy. Final adventures of Private Hargrove in Europe

== Late 1940s ==
Year	Country	Main title (Alternative titles)	Original title (Original script)	Director	Battles, campaigns, events depicted
1946	France	Battle of the Rails	La bataille du rail	René Clément	Resistance on French railways
1946	Italy	Before Him All Rome Trembled	Avanti a lui tutta Roma tremava	Carmine Gallone	Italian resistance in German-occupied Rome
1946	United States	The Best Years of Our Lives		William Wyler	1946 Best Picture depicting American servicemen struggling to return to civilian life after the war
1946	United Kingdom	The Captive Heart		Basil Dearden	British POWs in Germany
1946	United States	Courage of Lassie		Fred M. Wilcox	Lassie fights in the Aleutian Campaign and gets PTSD
1946	Italy	A Day in Life	Un giorno nella vita	Alessandro Blasetti	A group of Italian partisans seek refuge in a cloistered convent
1946	Philippines	Death March		Leopoldo Salcedo	Bataan Death March
1946	Poland	Forbidden Songs	Zakazane piosenki	Leonard Buczkowski	Musical. Polish resistance 1939–1945
1946	Philippines	Garrison 13		Gregorio Fernandez	War crimes committed by Imperial Japanese Army in the Philippines
1946	Philippines	Golden Clock	Orasang Ginto	Manuel Conde	Battle of Bataan and Battle of Corregidor
1946	Poland; Italy	The Great Road ^{†}	Wielka droga (in Polish)	Michał Waszyński	Polish Campaign 1939, Russia, Africa, Italy 1944
1946	Philippines	Guerilyera	Guerilyera	Octavio Silos	Guerrilla movement in the Philippines during the Japanese occupation of the Philippines
1946	Czechoslovakia	The Heroes Are Silent	Hrdinové mlčí	Miroslav Cikán	Resistance of Czech partisans
1946	Philippines	I Remember Bataan	Dugo ng Bayan	Fernando Poe, Sr.	Filipino resistance
1946	Soviet Union; Yugoslavia	In the Mountains of Yugoslavia	V gorach Yugoslavii (В горах Югославии) (in Russian); U planinama Jugoslavije (in Serbo-Croatian)	Abram Room	Yugoslav partisans; Draza Mihailovich and Chetniks
1946	United Kingdom	Journey Together		John Boulting	Three RAF pilots from recruitment to first combat
1946	Czechoslovakia	Men Without Wings	Muži bez křídel	František Čáp	Czech resistance in occupied Prague Airfield
1946	Italy	Monte Cassino	Montecassino (Montecassino nel cerchio di fuoco)	Arturo Gemmiti	Battle of Monte Cassino and destruction of the abbey
1946	France	Mr. Orchid	Le père tranquille	René Clément	French Resistance
1946	Italy	O sole mio	O sole mio	Giacomo Gentilomo	Four days of Naples
1946	United States	O.S.S.		Irving Pichel	US agents infiltrate in German-occupied France
1946	United States	Rendezvous 24		James Tinling	Germans planning revenge on Allies through atomic weapons
1946	Italy	Outcry	Il sole sorge ancora	Aldo Vergano	Italian disbanded soldiers after the armistice and resistance
1946	United Kingdom	School for Secrets		Peter Ustinov	Operation Biting
1946	United States	The Stranger		Orson Welles	A member of the United Nations War Crimes Committee hunts down a Nazi war criminal who has fled to Connecticut
1946	United Kingdom	Theirs is the Glory		Brian Desmond Hurst and Terence Young	Operation Market Garden
1946	Philippines	Walang Kamatayan	Walang Kamatayan	Tor Villano	Japanese Occupation of the Philippines
1947	Italy	Christmas at Camp 119	Natale al campo 119	Pietro Francisci	Comedy-drama. Italian POWs in a US camp before repatriation
1947	France	Le Bataillon du ciel	Sky Battalion	Alexandre Esway	Paratroopers camp of Free France, England.
1947	United Kingdom	Frieda		Basil Dearden	
1947	Italy	How I Lost the War	Come persi la guerra	Carlo Borghesio	Comedy. An unlucky soldier fights in nearly every Italian campaign since the Second Italo-Ethiopian War
1947	Denmark	Jenny and the Soldier	Soldaten og Jenny	Johan Jacobsen	
1947	Poland	The Last Stop	Ostatni etap	Wanda Jakubowska	Auschwitz-Birkenau
1947	Italy	Men and Skies ^{†}	Uomini e cieli	Francesco De Robertis	
1947	Occupied Germany	Seven Journeys (In Those Days) ^{†}	In jenen Tagen	Helmut Käutner	Twelve years of Nazi rule as experienced by a car
1947	China	The Spring River Flows East	Yījiāng Chūnshuǐ Xiàng Dōng Liú (一江春水向東流)	Cai Chusheng, Zheng Junli	Sino-Japanese War
1947	United States	13 Rue Madeleine		Henry Hathaway	US agents infiltrate in German-occupied France
1947	Italy	To Live in Peace	Vivere in pace	Luigi Zampa	Two former American PoWs hide in an Italian village occupied by the Germans in 1944
1947	Japan	War and Peace	Sensō to heiwa (戦争と平和)	Fumio Kamei; Satsuo Yamamoto	Japanese soldier falls prisoner of the Chinese and then returns to his home
1948	Italy	...And Not Say Goodbye ^{†}	...E non dirsi addio	Silvio Laurenti Rosa	Three escaped Allied PoWs and three German soldiers fraternize near Rome in November 1943
1948	United Kingdom	Against the Wind		Charles Crichton	Commando raid into occupied Belgium
1948	Austria	The Angel with the Trumpet (The Angel with the Trombone)	Der Engel mit der Posaune	Karl Hartl	Drama based on Ernst Lothar novel. Salzburg through both world wars
1948	Poland	Border Street	Ulica Graniczna	Aleksander Ford	Holocaust in occupied Poland
1948	United Kingdom; Netherlands	But Not in Vain	Niet Tevergeefs	Edmond T. Gréville	Drama.
1948	United States	Command Decision		Sam Wood	Command stresses in the US Eighth Air Force
1948	Italy	Damned War!... ^{†}	Accidenti alla guerra!...	Giorgio Simonelli	Comedy. An Italian disguises himself as a German soldier and is chosen to take part to the Lebensborn
1948	United States	Fighter Squadron		Raoul Walsh	P-47 fighters in the air war in Europe
1948	Italy	The Great Road ^{†}	La grande strada	Michał Waszyński, Vittorio Cottafavi	Polish Campaign 1939, Russia, Africa, Italy 1944
1948	United States	Jungle Patrol		Joseph M. Newman	P-40 fighters in the air war in the New Guinea campaign
1948	Italy	The Mascot of the Blue Devils ^{†}	La mascotte dei Diavoli Blu	Carlo Baltier	An Italian child becomes blind due to an accident with German cavalrymen during an American bombing, but regains his sight thanks to American physicians
1948	Occupied Germany	Morituri	Morituri (in Latin) (Freiwild (in German))	Eugen York	
1948	Yugoslavia	On Their Own Territory	Na svoji zemlji	France Štiglic	Slavs fighting to kill Germans and Italians on Eastern Front (World War 2)
1948	Norway; France	Operation Swallow: The Battle for Heavy Water	La Bataille de l'eau lourde (in French); Kampen om tungtvannet (in Norwegian)	Jean Dréville, Titus Vibe-Müller	Docudrama. Norwegian heavy water sabotage
1948	Italy	Phantoms of the Sea	Fantasmi del mare	Francesco De Robertis	The effects of the Italian armistice on an Italian warship (based upon the facts happened on the battleship Giulio Cesare)
1948	Hungary	Somewhere in Europe	Valahol Európában	Géza von Radványi	Story of a group of orphans in the final stage of World War II in Hungary. The film was financed by the Hungarian Communist Party.
1948	Soviet Union	Tale of a True Man	Povest' o nastoyashchem cheloveke (Повесть о настоящем человеке)	Aleksandr Stolper	Biography of the fighter pilot Aleksey Maresyev
1948	United States; Switzerland	The Search		Fred Zinnemann	Displaced persons in postwar Germany
1948	Poland	The Steel Hearts	Stalowe serca	Stanisław Januszewski	Silesia, Poland 1944 / 1945
1948	Denmark	The Viking Watch of the Danish Seaman	Støt står den danske sømand	Bodil Ipsen, Lau Lauritzen Jr.	
1949	United States	I Was A Male War Bride	Howard Hanks		Comedy. A biography of Henri Rochard ( pen name of Roger Charlier ), a Belgian who married an American nurse. Cary Grant, Ann Sheriden
1949	United States	Battleground		William A. Wellman	101st Airborne Division in the Battle of the Bulge
1949	Soviet Union	The Battle of Stalingrad	Stalingradskaya bitva (Сталинградская битва)	Vladimir Petrov	Battle of Stalingrad
1949	Philippines	Capas	Capas	Gregorio Fernandez	Bataan Death March survivor, appointed hometown mayor by Japanese, supports guerrilla activity
1949	Soviet Union	Encounter at the Elbe	Vstrecha na Elbe (Встреча на Эльбе)	Grigori Aleksandrov, Aleksei Utkin	Elbe Day
1949	Soviet Union	The Fall of Berlin	Padeniye Berlina (Падение Берлина)	Mikheil Chiaureli	Battle of Berlin
1949	Italy	The Flame That Will Not Die	La fiamma che non si spegne	Vittorio Cottafavi	Italian hero Salvo D'Acquisto
1949	United Kingdom; United States	The Hasty Heart		Vincent Sherman	British and US wounded soldiers in the Burma campaign
1949	United States	Home of the Brave		Mark Robson	Black soldier paralyzed after unit attacked on Pacific island
1949	United Kingdom	Landfall		Ken Annakin	Pilot believes he has sunk a friendly submarine
1949	United States	Lost Boundaries		Alfred L. Werker	Drama. White US Navy officer is actually Negro
1949	United States	Malaya		Richard Thorpe	Smuggler paroled to sneak rubber crop out of Japanese-held Malaya
1949	France	Mission in Tangier	Mission à Tanger	André Hunebelle	Journalist carries documents to London from Tangiers
1949	Italy	Monastery of Santa Chiara ^{†}	Monastero di Santa Chiara	Mario Sequi	Drama. Naples during the German and then the Allied occupations
1949	Spain	Neutrality	Neutralidad (Los caballeros del mar)	Eusebio Fernández Ardavín	A neutral Spanish merchantman rescues American sailors from a sunk ship
1949	Poland	The Others Will Follow	Za wami pójdą inni	Antoni Bohdziewicz	Warsaw, Polish resistance
1949	United Kingdom	Private Angelo		Michael Anderson, Peter Ustinov	Light-hearted story. Reluctantly conscripted Italian soldier
1949	Italy	Sailors Without Stars ^{†}	Marinai senza stelle	Francesco De Robertis	Italian boys embark on a torpedo boat (depicted by a Gabbiano-class corvette)
1949	United States	Sands of Iwo Jima		Allan Dwan	Battle of Tarawa and Battle of Iwo Jima
1949	Czechoslovakia	Silent Barricade	Němá barikáda	Otakar Vávra	Nazi Resistance
1949	United Kingdom	The Small Back Room		Michael Powell, Emeric Pressburger	Bomb disposal
1949	Denmark	That applies to us all ^{†·}	Det gælder os alle	Alice O'Fredericks	Young survivor from a concentration camp
1949	United Kingdom	They Were Not Divided		Terence Young	The British Guards Armoured Division
1949	United States	Twelve O'Clock High		Henry King	B-17 bombers of the US Eighth Air Force

== Dramatised documentaries ==
A dramatised documentary is a documentary film which includes dramatised scenes using actors in costume.
This format is distinct from a docudrama, which is a fully dramatised fact-based fictional work in a documentary style.

Year	Country	Main title (Alternative titles)	Original title (Original script)	Director	Battles, campaigns, events depicted
1940	France	My Crimes After Mein Kampf	Après Mein Kampf, mes crimes	"Jean-Jacques Valjean"	Assassinations of Ernst Röhm and Kurt von Schleicher on Night of the Long Knives, 1934, then Austrian Chancellor Engelbert Dollfuß, also 1934
1940	United Kingdom	Mein Kampf – My Crimes (After Mein Kampf?: The Story of Adolph Hitler)		Norman Lee (uncredited)	
1992	Canada	A Savage Christmas: The Fall of Hong Kong (TV)		Brian McKenna	Drama. Royal Rifles regiment at Battle of Hong Kong, 1941
1992	Canada	Death by Moonlight: Bomber Command (TV)		Brian McKenna	Drama. RCAF Lancaster bombing of German cities
1992	Canada	In Desperate Battle: Normandy 1944 (TV)		Brian McKenna	Drama. Black Watch regiment at Battle of Verrières Ridge, 1944
1995	Canada	War at Sea: U-boats in the St. Lawrence (TV)		Brian McKenna	Drama.
1995	Canada	War at Sea: The Black Pit (TV)		Brian McKenna	Drama.
1996	Canada	A Web of War		Brian McKenna	Drama. Polish Gen. Wladyslaw Anders
2003	United Kingdom	Killing Hitler (TV)		Jeremy Lovering	Drama. Operation Foxley plan to kill Hitler, 1944

== Spanish Civil War ==
In the Spanish Civil War, the Nationalists (the rebel side) are supported by Mussolini's Italy, Hitler's Germany, and a small number of international rightist volunteers. The Republicans (government side) are supported by Stalin's Soviet Union and a large number of leftist volunteers, the International Brigades.

The Nationalists under Francisco Franco win.

During World War II, Franco remains neutral – so Gibraltar is never overrun – but nevertheless he sends the Blue Division to fight for Germany on the Eastern Front.

For films about the Blue Division, see the List of World War II films since 1950.

== See also ==
- List of World War II short films
- List of World War II documentary films
- List of Allied propaganda films of World War II
- List of Holocaust films
- List of partisan films – films about World War II in Yugoslavia

Of related interest

- List of World War II video games

== Notes ==
- ^† This English language title is a literal translation from its original foreign language title.
  This title should always be replaced by an English language release title when that information becomes available.
