= Andromache (opera) =

1931 opera by Herbert Windt

- Opera by Herbert Windt
- Librettist: composer
- Language: German
- Based on: Euripides' Andromache, Jean Racine Andromaque, Virgil Aeneid, Homer The Illiad
- Premiere: 16 March 1932; Berlin State Opera

Andromache is an opera in two acts with words and music by Herbert Windt. The opera is based on the play Andromache by Euripides, as well as Racine's Andromache, Virgil's Aeneid with background material based on The Iliad by Homer.

== Background ==
In an article published six months before the opera's premiere, Windt acknowledged that he had known the story of Andromache for many years. The appeal of writing an opera on the topic (his first) was based on "my idea of choosing events and characters that were as remote in time as possible, in order to be able to ascribe new contexts and new lives to these actions and characters that are well known in themselves, without changing or alienating the image that we have established too much."

Windt understood the challenge of making a modern audience relate to legendary characters: "In order to bring an old subject to life, to awaken it from its dusty Sleeping Beauty sleep to new life, one must fill it with new life. And that can only happen if one tries to bring this past, which is several thousand years old, and our present closer together and bring them towards one another."

In seeing the connection between Skamander and current times, Windt wrote: "I certainly did not want to write a political play; but if such political events form the basis of a plot such as the present one, then naturally one cannot ignore its politics when adapting it without having brought it into some connection with our present."

Even before the Nazi Party came to power in 1933, they exerted an influence on German culture. The Militant League for German Culture sought to form a cohesive strategy for suppressing Jews from cultural life and amplifying those viewed as Aryan. As Windt had joined the Nazi Party in 1931, he was viewed as part of Nazi Germany's musical future.

== Roles ==
- Pyrrhus - about 25 years old
- Andromache - is a little older than Pyrrhus; she is a full-blown beauty. Her costume .(and that of her entourage) differs significantly from that of the Greek women
- Hermione - about 20 years old with red hair. Ambitious, she deserts her cousin Orest to marry Pyrrhus, a marriage based on power, not love
- Orest - about 30 years old, brown hair. He bears the fate of the House of Atreus
- Theano - blonde, like Pyrrhus, age 17; she mirrors her brother's desires and wishes.
- Lamia - a little older than Hermione. She functions more as a confidant than as a servant.
- Phönix - in his late 50s with graying beard. He is always in uniform, aware of the dignity of his position.
- Skamander - a handsome dark-curled six-year-old boy.
- Place: Epirus, in front of the palace of Pyrrhus
- Time: After the Trojan War

Role	Voice type	Premiere cast, 16 March 1932 Conductor: Erich Kleiber
Pyrrhus, king of Epirus, son of Achills	tenor	Fritz Wolff
Theano, his sister	soprano	Else Fink
Andromache, Hector's widow	mezzo-soprano	Margarete Klose
Skamander, Andromache's son	silent role	Käte Lore Schenk
Hermione, daughter of Helena and Menelaus	soprano	Moje Forbach
Lamia, servant to Hermione	contralto	Else Ruziczka
Orest, son of Agamemnon, cousin of Hermione	baritone	Herbert Janssen
Phönix, captain of Pyrrhus's palace	bass	Walter Beck
Servant of Hermione	tenor	Marcel Noë
Trojan women, soldiers of Pyrrhus
Choral director		Alexander Curth
Stage director		Franz Ludwig Hörth
Set design		Emil Preetorius

== Synopsis ==
Act 1.
In front of Pyrrhus’s palace, the chorus of captured Trojan women lament their lost homeland and their captivity. Pyrrhus steps out, accompanied by Andromache, his slave. She is in a rage, espousing her hatred for Pyrrhus. She also suspects that Pyrrhus is in danger, and knows he’s guarding a secret in the castle. She also knows that Hermione is partly behind this secret. Prophetically she sees that through Pyrrhus’s will Hector, Skamander and Troy be avenged. Pyrrhus is shaken by Andromache’s outburst, but he is certain that fate has brought him together with her: if he must die, it should be with her. Andromache vehemently rejects him. Her hate and that of the Trojan women grows more intense as she recounts that Pyrrhus smashed Skamander’s skull against the walls of Troy. Her growing hate increases Pyrrhus’s desire for her. Ready to take the last resort, she draws a dagger in an attempt to kill herself.

The servants restrain her and Pyrrhus reveals that Skamander is alive. He has his sister Theano bring the boy. Andromache embraces her son Skamander, but then breaks down, wondering why her son must live as a slave in a foreign land. Pyrrhus responds that Andromache can have Skamander’s upbringing totally in her hands. But Andromache lives in the past: She orders her followers to go to Hector’s tomb. Only at the memorial to her husband will they find peace.

Hermione appears and mocks Andromache, since she wants to be the queen. Taking up a whip, the Trojan woman cringe as Hermione declares that fate has decreed that she, Hermione, should be the queen, and that all of Greece support her. Pyrrhus responds that she is only following orders from the Greek princes and cares nothing for him.

At that moment trumpets are heard, heralding the arrival of the Greeks. Pyrrhus orders preparations for a reception to receive them. Once he has left, Hermione breaks down and pleads for help and advice from Lamia, her confidant. Lamia advises her to return home and reminds her of her beloved cousin Orest. But Hermione refuses to return since she betrayed Orest and can not return home as a beggar. Her pride urges her to fight on.

More trumpet blasts accompany Phönix, captain of Pyrrhus’s palace, who escorts the Greek guests. Hermione is shocked to see Orest as head of the Greek visitors. She realizes that her wish has come true: Orest has come to fetch her, and she wants to follow him back to Greece. But Orest reveals he came for a very different purpose: To force Hermione’s marriage to Pyrrhus and to kill Skamander as was demanded by Greek politics. He follows his companions into the palace.

Act 2.
Hermione waits outside the palace with her confidant Lamia. Lamia urges her to flee before it is too late, but Hermione refuses. Lamia says that Hermione should go to Pyrhhus and let him determine her fate, a suggestion also refused by Hermione who, as a member of the House of Atreus, refuses to give up her power.

Phönix, the palace guard exits the palace and Hermione asks him what was Pyrrhus’s decision. The guard says that Pyrrhus has offered the crown to the Trojan woman, Andromache. Insulted, Hermione approaches Orest (who is also leaving the palace with his entourage), begging him to fulfil his mission by killing Andromache, Skamander, and Pyrrhus. Half-mad, she believes she’s no longer speaking to Orest but to Lamia, and allows herself to be taken away.

Pyrrhus again asks Andromache to consider his proposal, if only for the sake of Skamander. Andromache asks Orest if its true that his mission is to kill her son, and he somberly replies yes. Pyrrhus and his warriors declare they will guarantee’s Skamander’s life if Andromache voluntarily submits to Pyrrhus in love, not a slave but as a princess. The opera ends with Andromache declaring that Ilion is defeated.

== Music ==
Writing in 1931, Windt felt his score should enable a wide range of possible mediums: "For me it is self-evident that the greatest possible unity must exist between book and score, if the two are not to run parallel to one another. I therefore had in mind wide and rich possibilities of contrast in keeping with the style of the book and in this respect I pulled out all the stops that were available to me; from the more intimate chamber music style to the pathetic and pompous style of the "big orchestra."

With regards to being modernistic, Windt wrote: "I will never be one of those innovators who want to be "modern" at any price; on the other hand, I am not reactionary enough to underestimate the extensions brought about by modernity and not to use them where I consider them appropriate and justified."

== Reception ==
Although the opera received mixed and negative reviews, a number of critics recognized Windt's talent.

Fritz Ohrmann, writing in Signale für die musikalische Welt, praised the quality of the performance which he felt was primarily due to Erich Kleiber's musical direction. He noted that "singer and actress" Margaret Klose gave a magnificent performance and gave high praise for Fritz Wolff. But Ohrmann had qualified words for the music. "Herbert Windt has not yet succeeded in creating an untouchable masterpiece on his first attempt. His first musical drama has undeniable, major weaknesses, but these cannot conceal the fact that behind him stands a full-blooded dramatist. But one who is only a promise whose creative powers - I believe - are far from being released because Windt was under the greatest psychological pressure for too long...Windt is the type of late-maturing composer, still internally unfree, who struggles with determination and maximum emotional commitment to realize his far-reaching artistic ideal. His themes do not always appear to have grown naturally, but often seem to have been forced upon him. They therefore lack a good deal of healthy drive. Above all, however, they lack the great breath to be able to swing out into a broad melody...This is how I explain the feverish restlessness of this music, which repeatedly pushes towards passionate outbursts, repeatedly towards new ecstasies and therefore too often lacks wise economy in the application of strong musical expressive powers... in the large ensembles and the effective choirs he demonstrates an extraordinary contrapuntal skill. He is thoroughly versed in the secrets of the diverse modern rhythms and handles the rich color palette of the orchestra with superior confidence.

Hugo Leichtentritt observed: "The singers tried their best without achieving a vocal effect that corresponded to the expenditure of resources. [The singers] were busy in the main roles, but due to the unsingable nature of their roles, they were only able to present themselves in the best possible light in places. The applause was friendly, but hardly reflected any enthusiasm or excitement on the part of the audience."

The unnamed critic in Der Auftakt wrote: "Unfortunately, the musician Windt only succeeds in very rare moments in capturing our attention through his score … What he writes is typical of the old music of excitement, without any structure, without formal consolidation, an exalted gesticulating music that differs from Strauss's Elektra only in its lack of substance and the exhaustion of the means that were revolutionary at the time. Windt uses a huge range of instruments. He wants to translate the mental struggles and convulsions of his characters into sound expression. But it remains a chaos that gives birth to no star."

Writing for De Muziek, Robert Oboussier opined: In style and attitude the work remains within the expressionism laid out by Richard Strauss' "Elektra" and the operas of Franz Schreker. This genre, that in its striving for monumental expression knows no boundaries and whose musical gestures go from one extreme to the other, expires without achieving an objective form and structure, and is completely outside our time...Only in some parts of the [opera]...in the more thoughtful arias and into the choral songs... do we feel that a personality that has something to say in his own form of expression, [and in those moment we recognize] that we are dealing with one serious musician with dramatic and lyrical talent.

Writing as the Berlin correspondent for the New York Times conservative music critic Herbert F. Peyser gave a very negative view of the opera. "One can scarcely imagine a work for the lyric theatre more dismally barren of either popular appeal or artistic reward. A two-and-one-half-hour yelling match carried on against an unmerciful racket of heavy orchestral artillery, darkened stage...From one end of the evening to the other the piece is as static as it is dour. Of action there is as good as none...A chorus of mourning women chants and wails lugubriously...[the lead singers] spout and shriek in jagged declamation yards upon yards of those verbose, mouth-filling speeches which the French call 'tirades.'"

== Aftermath ==
Avoiding too radical a modernist style, Windt's music for Andromache showed enough color and power that he was selected to score his first feature-length film, Morgenrot. Premiering days after the Nazis came to power, the film is considered the first ideological film of Nazi Germany. Windt went on to write numerous film scores both during and after the Nazi period, including three films for Leni Riefenstahl.

== Publication ==
The vocal score was published by Universal Edition, copyright 1931, plate number U.E. 1118 (317 pages).

== Sources used ==
- "Andromache: Opern-Uraufführung in der Berliner Staatsoper". Der Auftakt: 101–102. 1932.
- Ewers, Hanns Heinz (1932). "Einführung in das Werk". Blätter der Staatsoper. 12. Jahrgang (Heft 8): 10–11.
- Leichtentritt, Hugo (1932). "Herbert Windt: Andromache (Berlin, Staatsoper)". Die Musik. 24 (7): 517–518.
- Ohrmann, Fritz (1932). "Herbet Windts "Andromache" in der Berliner Staatsoper". Signale für die musikalische Welt. 90 (12): 271–274.
- Oboussier, Robert (1932). "Correspondenties Buitenland: Uit Berlijn". De Muziek. 6: 372.
- Peyser, Herbert F. (April 17, 1932). "Andromache' a Dreary Opera". New York Times: 8.
- Strobel, Heinrich (1932). "Umgruppierung in den Berliner Theatern". Melos. 11. Jahr (Heft 4): 147–148.
- Volker, Reimar (2003). "Von oben sehr erwünscht": Die Filmmusik Herbert Windts im NS-Propagandafilm. Trier: WT Wissenschaftlicher Verlag. ISBN 9783884765258.
- Windt, Herbert (1931). "Andromache". Anbruch. 13 Jahrgang (Heft 6-7): 152–153.

reprinted as:

- Windt, Herbert (1932). "Warum "Andromache"?". Blätter der Staatsoper. 12. Jahrgang (Heft 8): 5–6.
