= Klaus Detlef Sierck =

German actor

- Born: 30 March 1925; Berlin, Germany
- Died: 1944 (aged 18–19); Novoaleksandrovka, Ukrainian SSR, Soviet Union
- Occupation: Actor
- Years active: 1935–1942
- Father: Douglas Sirk

Klaus Detlef Sierck (30 March 1925 – 1944) was a German child actor. He was the son of the theatre and film director Hans Detlef Sierck (better known today as Hollywood director Douglas Sirk) and the theatre actress Lydia Brincken. After his parents separated in 1928, Sierck grew up with his mother and was distanced from his father during the Nazi period after the latter married actress Hilde Jary, who was Jewish.

Klaus Detlef Sierck was active in film between 1935 and 1942. One of Sierck's greatest roles was Kadett Hohenhausen in Karl Richter's Kadetten in 1939. The anti-Russian propaganda film about Prussian cadets captured and abused by inhuman Cossacks during the Seven Years' War could not initially be shown due to the Hitler–Stalin Pact and was only shown in German cinemas in December 1941, after the attack on the Soviet Union. He was conscripted into the German Army during the Second World War, and while serving on the Eastern Front as a fusilier in the Panzer-Grenadier-Division Großdeutschland was killed in action at Novoaleksandrovka either on 6 March 1944 or 22 May 1944.

== Selected filmography ==
- Die Saat geht auf (1935)
- Serenade (1937)
- Streit um den Knaben Jo (1937)
- Schatten über St. Pauli (1938)
- Verwehte Spuren (1938)
- Preußische Liebesgeschichte (1938)
- Sehnsucht nach Afrika (1939)
- Das Recht auf Liebe (1940)
- Aus erster Ehe (1940)
- Kadetten (1941)
- Kopf hoch, Johannes! (1941)
- Der große König (1942)
