= Hannes Stelzer =

Austrian actor

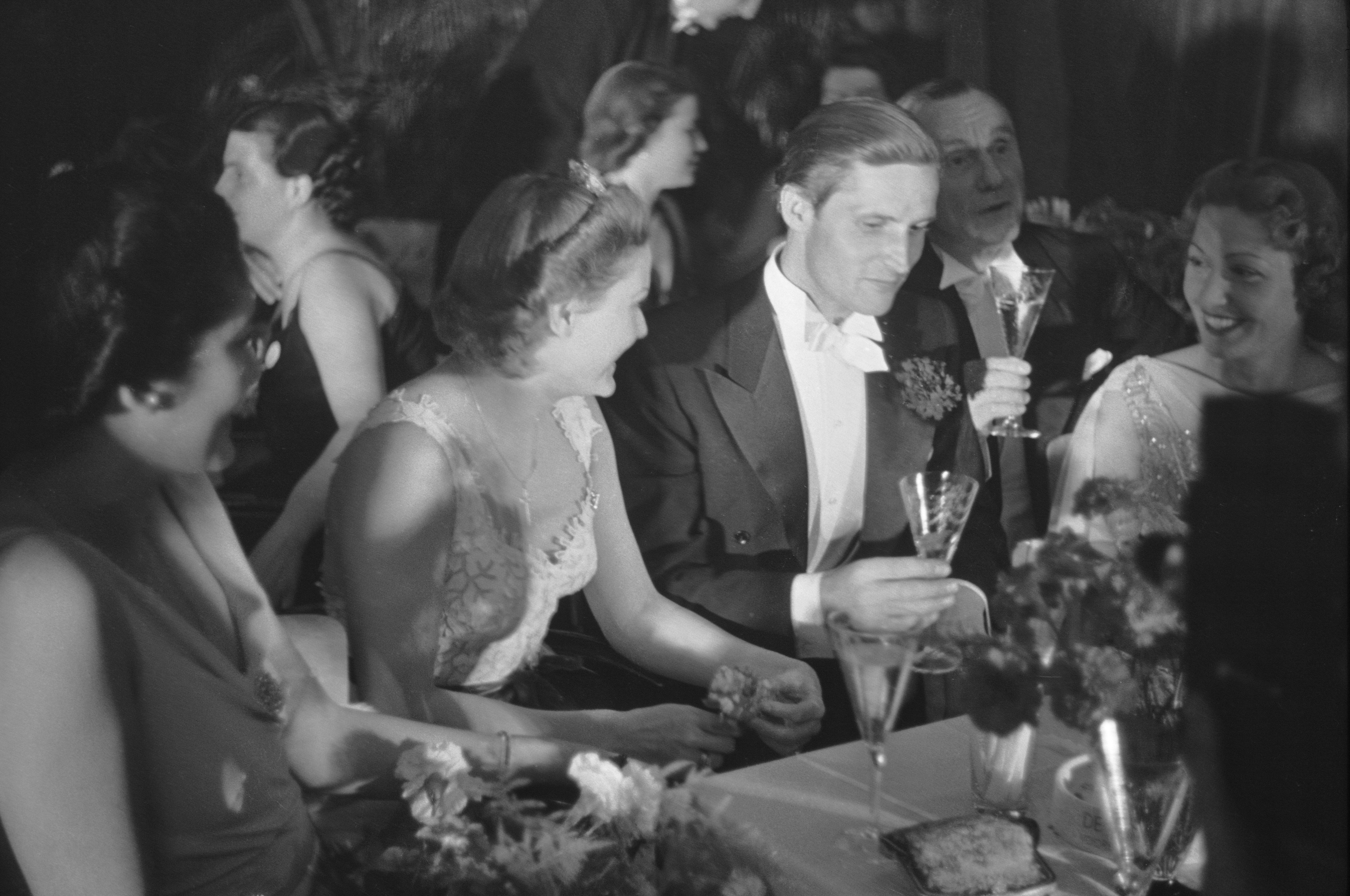
- Stelzer (centre), w. Marika Rökk, Georg Jacoby and Heli Finkenzeller (1938)
- Born: 20 June 1910; Graz, Styria, Austria-Hungary
- Died: 27 December 1944 (aged 34); Komárom, Hungary
- Occupation: Actor
- Years active: 1936 – 1943 (film)

Hannes Stelzer (20 June 1910 – 27 December 1944) was an Austrian film actor. Stelzer was a leading actor in German cinema during the Nazi era.

As well as appearing in dramas and light comedies, Stelzer also featured in more propagandistic works, including leading roles in the war films Stukas and The Crew of the Dora (1943), his final film.

During the Second World War Stelzer served in the German Air Force. In 1944 he was killed in a plane crash near Komáron, Hungary, possibly as the result of enemy action. By Reichskulturkammer, dated 27 January 1945, he was returning from mission during heavy snowstorm and hit the power lines.

Stelzer married Johanna Weyand in 1935 and, after they divorced, the German actress Maria Bard in 1940, whom he remained married to until her death in 1944.

== Selected filmography ==
- The Dreamer (1936)
- The Adventurer of Paris (1936)
- Truxa (1937)
- The Ruler (1937)
- Signal in the Night (1937)
- Travelling People (1938)
- A Hopeless Case (1939)
- New Year's Eve on Alexanderplatz (1939)
- Stukas (1941)
- Venus on Trial (1941)
- Above All Else in the World (1941)
- The Crew of the Dora (1943)

== Bibliography ==
- Kreimeier, Klaus: The Ufa Story: A History of Germany's Greatest Film Company, 1918–1945. Oakland, CA: University of California Press, 1999.
- Giesen, Rolf: Nazi propaganda films: a history and filmography. Jefferson, NC: McFarland & Company, 2003.
- Gillespie, William: Karl Ritter. His Life and 'Zeitfilms' under National Socialism. 2nd exp. edition. Potts Points, NSW: German Films Dot Net 2014. (Chapter: 6. Ritter, Hannes Stelzer and a Hero's Death).
