= Herbert Windt =

German composer

- Born: September 15, 1894
- Died: November 2, 1965 (aged 71)
- Era: 20th century

Herbert Windt (15 September 1894, Senftenberg, Brandenburg – 2 November 1965, Deisenhofen, now a part of Oberhaching, Bavaria) was a German composer who became one of the most significant film score composers of the Third Reich. He was best known for his collaborations with the director Leni Riefenstahl on films Triumph of the Will and Olympia.

== Biography ==
Windt studied at the Sternsches Konservatorium in Berlin but left to enlist in the army at the start of World War I. Severely wounded, he spent two years in hospital, during which he began composing chamber music.

In 1920, Windt received a grant to study with the renowned Franz Schreker in the composer's master class at the Berlin Academy of Music. Windt joined the NSDAP in 1931. A grant by the government of the Weimar Republic led to his opera Andromache, which was first performed in 1932. An UFA film producer in the audience took notice of Windt's music. Windt was offered a commission to write the music for UFA's 1933 film Morgenrot (Red Morning), a story about a gallant World War I U-boat crew.

Windt became one of the most significant film score composers of the Third Reich along with Wolfgang Zeller, Michael Jary, Franz Grothe, and Georg Haentzschel. He composed music for several Nazi public events and radio programs. He was best known for his collaborations with Leni Riefenstahl, the director of Triumph of the Will (1934/35), Olympia (1938), and Tiefland (1945/54), but he also worked with directors like Wolfgang Liebeneiner (Die Entlassung), Georg Wilhelm Pabst (Paracelsus), Frank Wisbar (The Unknown, Fährmann Maria, Stalingrad: Dogs, Do You Want to Live Forever?), and Gustav Ucicky (Morgenrot).

Windt's film scores for propaganda films drew the attention of the sociologist Siegfried Kracauer, who analysed the composer's works in the tracts From Caligari to Hitler: A Psychological History of the German Film and Theory of Film: The Redemption of Physical Reality.

Despite the warm reception for his music in Nazi party circles, Windt himself fell into disfavor with the rulers of Germany in that period. He was completely cleared in the post-war de-Nazification trials.

== Works ==
=== Cantata ===
- Andante religioso, eine Kammersinfonie nach sechs Sonaten (premiered in 1921) (Wien: Universal-Edition, 1942)

=== Opera ===
- Andromache (1932 premiere in Berlin)

=== Film scores ===
- Thou Shalt Not Covet (1933)
- Morgenrot (1933)
- Refugees (1933)
- Der Sieg des Glaubens (1933)
- William Tell (1934)
- At the End of the World (1934)
- The Riders of German East Africa (1934)
- The Four Musketeers (1934)
- Triumph of the Will (1935)
- My Life for Maria Isabella (1935)
- The Unknown (1936)
- Fährmann Maria (1936)
- Home Guardsman Bruggler (1936)
- Olympia (1938)
- The Mystery of Betty Bonn (1938)
- Frau Sixta (1938)
- Northern Lights (1938)
- By a Silken Thread (1938)
- Pour le Mérite (1938)
- Cadets (1939)
- Midsummer Night's Fire (1939)
- Legion Condor (1939)
- Friedrich Schiller – Triumph eines Genies (1940)
- Feldzug in Polen (1940)
- Sieg im Westen (1941)
- Lightning Around Barbara (1941)
- Above All Else in the World (1941)
- Die Entlassung (1942)
- The Red Terror (1942)
- Paracelsus (1943)
- The Crew of the Dora (1943)
- Die Degenhardts (1944)
- Anna Alt (1945)
- The Woman from Last Night (1950)
- Stips (1951)
- Fight of the Tertia (1952)
- When the Heath Dreams at Night (1952)
- Christina (1953)
- Tiefland (1954)
- Heroism after Hours (1955)
- Stalingrad: Dogs, Do You Want to Live Forever? (1958)
- Heart Without Mercy (1958)
- Im Namen einer Mutter (1960)

== Works cited ==
- Hull, David (1969). Film in the Third Reich: Art and Propaganda in Nazi Germany. Simon & Schuster. SBN 671214861.

== Bibliography ==
- Volker, Reimar. "Von oben sehr erwünscht" : die Filmmusik Herbert Windts im NS-Propagandafilm. Trier: WVT, Wissenschaftlicher Verlag Trier, 2003.
- Walter, Michael. "Die Musik des Olympiafilms von 1938". Acta Musicologica 62, no. 1 (Jan-Apr 1990): 82-113 .
