= Richard Schneider-Edenkoben =

German screenwriter and film director (1899–1986)

- Born: 25 June 1899; Edenkoben, German Empire
- Died: 23 September 1986 (aged 87); Nindorf, West Germany
- Occupations: Writer, Director
- Years active: 1931-1939 (film )

Richard Schneider-Edenkoben (1899–1986) was a German screenwriter and film director.

== Selected filmography ==
- The Big Attraction (1931)
- Thou Shalt Not Covet (1933)
- The Foolish Virgin (1935)
- Signal in the Night (1937)
- New Year's Eve on Alexanderplatz (1939)

== Bibliography ==
- Kreimeier, Klaus. The Ufa story: a history of Germany's greatest film company, 1918–1945. University of California Press, 1999.
