= Andrews Engelmann =

Russian-Swiss actor (1901–1992)

- Born: 23 March 1901; Saint Petersburg, Russian Empire
- Died: 25 February 1992 (aged 90); Basel, Basel-Stadt, Switzerland
- Other name: André von Engelman
- Education: S. M. Kirov Military Medical Academy; Friedrich-Wilhelm University
- Occupation: Actor

Andrews Engelmann (born Andrei Engelmann, Russian: Андрей Энгельман; 23 March 1901 – 25 February 1992) was a Russian-Swiss actor. He worked mostly in French and German films, but also appeared in a number of British films during his career.

Engelmann was born to Baltic German parents in Saint Petersburg in 1901. He attended S. M. Kirov Military Medical Academy. During the Russian Civil War, he emigrated to Germany via a Nansen passport, continuing his studies at Friedrich-Wilhelm University. He was also credited as André von Engelman.

He married Charlotte Susa in 1939. He retired from acting in 1953, moving to Switzerland with his wife and obtaining Swiss citizenship. Engelmann became a manufacturer of air conditioning equipment in Basel, and died there in 1992.

== Selected filmography ==
- The Two Boys (1924)
- Mare Nostrum (1926)
- Education of a Prince (1927)
- Moulin Rouge (1928)
- Diary of a Lost Girl (1929)
- City of Play (1929)
- The Three Passions (1929)
- Cagliostro (1929)
- Two Worlds (1930)
- La Femme d'une nuit (1931)
- The Yellow House of King-Fu (1931)
- The Wandering Beast (1932)
- Baroud (1933)
- Refugees (1933)
- I Spy (1934)
- The Island (1934)
- At the End of the World (1934)
- The Crouching Beast (1935)
- Vertigo (1935)
- Return to Paradise (1935)
- Stormy Weather (1935)
- Prison Breaker (1936)
- The Adventurer of Paris (1936)
- The Last Four on Santa Cruz (1936)
- Toilers of the Sea (1936)
- The Pearls of the Crown (1937)
- Faded Melody (1938)
- The Rebel (1938)
- Water for Canitoga (1939)
- Legion Condor (1939)
- Cadets (1939)
- Commissioner Eyck (1940)
- Above All Else in the World (1941)
- Carl Peters (1941)
- Kora Terry (1940)
- The Red Terror (1942)
- Secret File W.B.1 (1942)
- Münchhausen (1943)
- Seven Letters (1944)
- The Appeal to Conscience (1949)
- The Secret of Mayerling (1949)
- Mystery in Shanghai (1950)
- Scandal at the Embassy (1950)
- The Case of Doctor Galloy (1951)
- Skipper Next to God (1951)
- The Girl with the Whip (1952)
- The Secret of the Mountain Lake (1952)

== Bibliography ==
- Hull, David S. Film in the Third Reich: A Study of the German Cinema, 1933-1945. University of California Press, 1969.
- Klee, Ernst. Das Kulturlexikon zum Dritten Reich. Wer war was vor und nach 1945. S. Fischer. Frankfurt, 2007, ISBN 978-3-10-039326-5, p. 136.
- Schöning, Jörg. "Andrews Engelmann – Schauspieler" in: CineGraph – Lexikon zum deutschsprachigen Film. volume 2, 1984.
- Weniger, Kay. Das große Personenlexikon des Films. Schwarzkopf & Schwarzkopf, Berlin 2001, ISBN 3-89602-340-3, p. 555
