= Patriots (1937 film) =

1937 film

- Directed by: Karl Ritter
- Written by: Felix Lützkendorf (writer); Philipp Lothar Mayring (writer); Karl Ritter (writer)
- Produced by: Karl Ritter
- Starring: See below
- Cinematography: Günther Anders
- Edited by: Gottfried Ritter
- Music by: Theo Mackeben
- Distributed by: UFA
- Release date: 24 August 1937
- Running time: 96 minutes
- Country: Germany
- Language: German

Patriots (German: Patrioten) is a 1937 German film directed by Karl Ritter.

== Cast ==
- Mathias Wieman as Peter Thomann, called Pierre
- Lída Baarová as Thérèse, called Jou-Jou
- Bruno Hübner as Jules Martin, director of a front-line theatre
- Hilde Körber as Suzanne
- Paul Dahlke as Charles
- Nicolas Koline as Nikita
- Kurt Seifert as Alphonse
- Edwin Juergenssen as commandant
- Willi Rose as desk officer
- Ewald Wenck as police officer
- Otz Tollen as judge in wartime court
- Ernst Karchow as prosecutor
- André Saint-Germain as defending counsel
- Lutz Götz as German POW
- Paul Schwed as German POW
- Karl Hannemann as janitor
- Gustav Mahnke as sergeant
- Arthur Fritz Eugens as Jean-Baptiste - Suzannes fünfjähriger Sohn
- Hermann Pfeiffer as Hotelier
- Betty Sedlmayr as Singer

== Release ==
The film was banned in Czechoslovakia.

== Works cited ==
- Waldman, Harry (2008). Nazi Films In America, 1933-1942. McFarland & Company. ISBN 9780786438617.
