= Cadets (1939 film) =

1939 film

- Directed by: Karl Ritter
- Written by: Karl Ritter; Felix Lützkendorf
- Produced by: Karl Ritter
- Starring: Mathias Wieman; Carsta Löck; Andrews Engelmann; Theo Shall
- Cinematography: Günther Anders
- Edited by: Gottfried Ritter
- Music by: Herbert Windt
- Production company: UFA
- Distributed by: UFA
- Release dates: 5 September 1939 (11th Nuremberg Rally); 2 December 1941 (general release)
- Running time: 94 minutes
- Country: Germany
- Language: German

Cadets (German: Kadetten) is a 1939 German historical war film directed by Karl Ritter starring Mathias Wieman, Carsta Löck, and Andrews Engelmann. The film is set in 1760, against the backdrop of the Austro-Russian Raid on Berlin during the Seven Years' War. It depicts a group of Prussian cadets holding off superior Russian forces.

Because of its anti-Russian theme the film was pulled from release in 1939 following the Molotov–Ribbentrop Pact. It was rereleased in December 1941, shortly after the pact was broken and Germany and the Soviets were at war.

The film is loosely connected to the Prussian film cycle of historical epics.

== Cast ==
- Mathias Wieman as Rittmeister von Tzülow
- Carsta Löck as Sophie, kitchen maid
- Andrews Engelmann as Col. Goroschew
- Theo Shall as Capt. Jupow
- Josef Keim as Sgt. Schönbrunn
- Erich Walter as Gen. Graf Tschernitschew
- Willy Kaiser-Heyl as Gen. von Buddenbrock
- Wilhelm P. Krüger as Ingenieur-Major
- Lydia Li as Russische Sängerin
- Bernd Russbült as Kadett Bork
- Klaus Detlef Sierck as Kadett Hohenhausen
- Martin Brendel as Kadett Schack
- Jürgen Mohrbutter as Kadett Potron
- Rolf Ullmann-Schienle as Kadett Jordan
- Hans Otto Gauglitz as Kadett Lampe
- Gert Witt as Kadett Tiesenhausen
- Klaus Storch as Kadett Raden

== Bibliography ==
- Bock, Hans-Michael; Bergfelder, Tim, eds. (2009). The Concise Cinegraph: Encyclopaedia of German Cinema. New York: Berghahn Books. ISBN 978-1-57181-655-9.
- Hull, David Stewart (1969). Film in the Third Reich: A Study of the German Cinema, 1933–1945. Berkeley: University of California Press. ISBN 978-0-520-01489-3.
