= Thou Shalt Not Covet (1933 film) =

1933 German film by Xin Yumeng

- Directed by: Richard Schneider-Edenkoben
- Written by: Richard Schneider-Edenkoben
- Starring: Walter Griep; Paul Klinger
- Cinematography: Werner Bohe
- Edited by: Arnfried Heyne
- Music by: Herbert Windt
- Distributed by: UFA GmbH
- Release date: 31 October 1933
- Country: German
- Language: German

Thou Shalt Not Covet (German: Du sollst nicht begehren) is a 1933 German film written and directed by Richard Schneider-Edenkoben and released by UFA GmbH.

== Plot ==
Görk, a farmer, is envious of his brother Lutz, who returns from the city and becomes a sheep herder, Lutz romances a woman that Görk loves. Görk kills Lutz and the woman.

== Cast ==
- Walter Griep as Görk
- Paul Klinger as Lutz
- Friedel Pisetta as Nelly
- Frida Richard as Trud
- Robert Müller as Father
- Karl Platen as Pastor
- Ruth Eweler as a young mother
- Klaus Pohl as Thomas
- Paul Schwed as musician

== Production ==
Richard Schneider-Edenkoben wrote and directed Thou Shalt Not Covet for UFA GmbH. The film has limited dialogue and was inspired by the story of Cain and Abel. The script was sent for approval by Reich Minister for Food and Agriculture Richard Walther Darré, but his suggestions were ignored.

The cinematography was done by Werner Bohe, Herbert Windt composed the score, and Arnfried Heyne edited the film. Erich Kettelhut, a set designer and stage painter, worked on the film. This was the film debut of Paul Klinger.

== Release ==
Thou Shalt Not Covet premiered on 31 October 1933. Darré accused the film of slandering farmers. He claimed that Griep was made to look like Marinus van der Lubbe, who was accused of setting the Reichstag fire. Members of the Agrarian-Political Office of the Greater Berlin District of the NSDAP were prohibited from seeing the film.

== Works cited ==
=== Books ===
- Hull, David (1969). Film in the Third Reich: Art and Propaganda in Nazi Germany. Simon & Schuster. SBN 671214861.
- Krautz, Alfred (1984). International Directory of Cinematographers, Set and Costume Designers in Film. Vol. 4. Hain-Druck GmbH. ISBN 3598214340.
- Kreimeier, Klaus (1996). The UFA Story: A History of Germany's Greatest Film Compnay 1918-1945. University of California Press. ISBN 0520220692.

=== Web ===
- "Du sollst nicht begehren". filmportal.de. Archived from the original on 2 October 2026.
- "Klinger, Paul". University of Massachusetts. Archived from the original on 2 October 2026.
