= A Prussian Love Story =

1938 film

- Directed by: Paul Martin
- Written by: Paul Martin; Rolf Lauckner
- Produced by: Bruno Duday
- Starring: Karl Günther: Hans Nielsen; Willy Fritsch
- Cinematography: Robert Baberske
- Edited by: Axel von Werner
- Music by: Harald Böhmelt
- Production company: UFA
- Distributed by: Central-Europäischer-Filmverleih
- Release date: 12 April 1950
- Running time: 91 minutes
- Country: Germany
- Language: German

A Prussian Love Story (Originally German: Preußische Liebesgeschichte, released in 1950 as Liebeslegende) is a 1938 German historical romance film directed by Paul Martin and starring Karl Günther, Hans Nielsen, and Willy Fritsch. The film depicts the love affair between William I and Elisa Radziwill. The film was shot at the Babelsberg Studios of UFA in Berlin. The film sets were designed by the art directors Willy Schiller and Karl Haacker. In the Third Reich the film was banned right after completion because the love affair of Joseph Goebbels and the actress Lída Baarová had become public. It was finally released in 1950 in West Germany by the Munich-based distributor Central-Europäischer-Filmverleih.

== Cast ==
- Lída Baarová as Princess Elisa Radziwill
- Willy Fritsch as Prince Wilhelm
- Harry Liedtke as Prince Anton Radziwill
- Karl Günther as King Friedrich Wilhelm III
- Hans Nielsen as Prince Friedrich Wilhelm
- Dieter Borsche as Prince Karl
- Vera von Langen as Princess Charlotte
- Sabine Peters as Princess Alexandrine
- Hermine Körner as Princess Louise
- Dagny Servaes as Grand Duchess Maria Pavlovna
- Marina von Ditmar as Princess Marie of Saxe-Weimar-Eisenach (1808–1877)
- Viktoria von Ballasko as Princess Augusta
- Waldemar Leitgeb as Prince Nicholas of Russia
- Will Dohm as Prince Wittgenstein
- Ernst Dernburg as High Minister von Schilden
- Heinrich Schroth as Privy Councillor von Raumer
- Paul Wagner as Major von Gerlach
- Eduard von Winterstein as General von Gneisenau
- Werner Schott as General Adjutant von Witzleben
- Ernst Sattler as Dr. Hufeland
- Albert Lippert as Gustav, Prince of Sweden
- Klaus Detlef Sierck as Young Chopin
- Werner Stock as Stablehand Strucks
- Suse Graf as Lulu von Kleist
- Gisela Faßbinder as Gänseliesl
- Michael von Newlinski as Chopin Listener 1
- Toni Tetzlaff as Chopin Listener 2
- Curt Breitkopf as Alexander I, Tsar of Russia
- Werner Pledath as a Priest

== Bibliography ==
- Bergfelder, Tim; Street, Sarah, eds. (2004). The Titanic in Myth and Memory: Representations in Visual and Literary Culture. London: I. B. Tauris. ISBN 978-1-85043-432-0.
- Giloi, Eva (2011). Monarchy, Myth, and Material Culture in Germany 1750–1950. Cambridge: Cambridge University Press. ISBN 978-0-521-76198-7.
- Hull, David Stewart (1969). Film in the Third Reich: A Study of the German Cinema, 1933–1945. Berkeley: University of California Press. ISBN 978-0-520-01489-3.
- Kreimeier, Klaus (1999). The Ufa Story: A History of Germany's Greatest Film Company, 1918–1945. Berkeley: University of California Press. ISBN 978-0-520-22069-0.
