= The Adventurer of Paris =

1936 film directed by Karlheinz Martin

- Directed by: Karlheinz Martin
- Written by: Axel Eggebrecht
- Produced by: Rolf Randolf
- Starring: Karin Hardt; Peter Voss; Hannes Stelzer
- Cinematography: Karl Puth
- Edited by: Ludolf Grisebach
- Music by: Werner Bochmann
- Production company: Rolf Randolf-Film
- Distributed by: Terra Film
- Release date: 29 May 1936
- Running time: 81 minutes
- Country: Germany
- Language: German

The Adventurer of Paris (German: Der Abenteurer von Paris) is a 1936 German romantic drama film directed by Karlheinz Martin and starring Karin Hardt, Peter Voss and Hannes Stelzer. It was shot at the Halensee Studios in Berlin. The film's sets were designed by the art director Heinrich Richter.

== Cast ==
- Karin Hardt as Mabel
- Peter Voss as Mitja, Fürst Artamanow
- Hannes Stelzer as Igor - sein Bruder
- Hilde von Stolz as Lucienne Renard
- Theodor Loos as Sir Henry Vinston
- Erik Ode as Robert - sein Sohn
- Andrews Engelmann as Fedor Lossew
- Greta Keller as Cabaret Singer
- Rose Rauch as Cabaret Singer

== Bibliography ==
- Klaus, Ulrich J. Deutsche Tonfilme: Jahrgang 1936. Klaus-Archiv, 1988.
- Waldman, Harry. Nazi Films in America, 1933-1942. McFarland, 2008.
