= Moje Forbach =

German film actor, stage actor and opera singer

Moje Forbach, real name Amalie Staubwasser (24 September 1898 – 21 December 1993), was a German operatic soprano and actress.

== Life ==
Born in Munich, Forbach spent large parts of her childhood and her youth in the Schloss Reichertshausen belonging to the family of Cetto. Her original career goal was a teacher of home economics, but at her mother's request she studied singing in Munich from 1916. After her education she changed her stage name and made her debut at the Landestheater in Gotha in 1920 in the role of Elisabeth in Wagner's Tannhäuser. In 1921 Forbach was engaged at the Theater Augsburg, from 1924 at the Staatstheater Stuttgart before she was engaged by Otto Klemperer to the Krolloper in Berlin. During her time in Berlin, Forbach had a number of guest contracts, for example in 1926 and 1928 at the Wiener Staatsoper and at the Staatsoper Unter den Linden. She sang at the Bavarian State Opera and at the Semperoper, 1930 in Amsterdam, 1931 at the national operas of Belgrade and Zagreb. After further engagements at the Hamburg State Opera in 1934/35, at the Nationaltheater Mannheim (1935) and 1936 at the Theater Trier Forbach ended her singing career and worked as an actress. Until the end of the Second World War she performed at the Altonaer Theater in Hamburg, at the Schiller Theater in Berlin and in Düsseldorf. After the end of the war Forbach worked in Essen, at the Münchner Kammerspielen and most recently at the Schauspiel Köln.

Forbach sang many Wagner roles in her opera career, Senta in Der fliegende Holländer, Gutrune in Götterdämmerung, Sieglinde and later also Brünnhilde in Die Walküre and Isolde in Tristan und Isolde. Furthermore she was Charlotte in E. Krenek's Der Diktator, Leonore in Beethovens's Fidelio, Marie in A. Berg's Wozzeck and sang the only part in A.Schönberg's monodrama Erwartung.

From 1960 onwards, Forbach was occasionally seen on television, and she also appeared in several radio play productions of the Westdeutscher Rundfunk. Since 1965 Forbach also taught at the Otto-Falckenberg-Schule in Munich.

Forbach died in Munich at age 95.

== Family ==
Forbach was born as the eldest of three sisters as daughter of General Otto Staubwasser and his wife Marianne Staubwasser, née von Cetto. Her grandmother was Jenny Mejo, her great-aunt Anna Grobecker. Her parents, Franz Mejo (1798-1855) and Rosa Mejo-Straub (* 1798), were therefore her great-grandparents. The four aforementioned were all opera singers.

== Filmography ==
- 1960: Ein Monat auf dem Lande
- 1967: Liebe für Liebe
- 1968: Teaparty
- 1968: Anna Böckler
- 1970: Der Nagel
- 1971: Der Selbstmörder
- 1975: Tristan
- 1982: Unheimliche Geschichten – Als die Zeit still stand

== Radio plays ==
- 1953: Die Sündflut – Author: Ernst Barlach – director: Ludwig Cremer
- 1954: The Lark – Author: Jean Anouilh – director: Wilhelm Semmelroth
- 1957: Christgeburt – Authors: Karlheinz Gutheim and Wilhelm Reinking – director: Eduard Hermann
- 1960: Projekt "Schwarze Witwe" – Author: Werner Helmes – director: Friedhelm Ortmann
- 1960: Ein kleiner trauriger Fluß – Author: Günter Rudorf – director: Otto Kurth
- 1961: Die Orestie – Author: Aeschylus – director: Friedhelm Ortmann
- 1961: Es geschah in … (sequel: Die Überstunden des Simon Parblinger) – Author: Josef Martin Bauer – director: Heinz Dieter Köhler
- 1962: Weiße Telefone – Author: Werner Helmes – director: Otto Kurth
