= Above All Else in the World =

1941 Nazi propaganda film

- Directed by: Karl Ritter
- Written by: Felix Lützkendorf; Karl Ritter
- Produced by: Karl Ritter
- Starring: Paul Hartmann; Hannes Stelzer; Fritz Kampers; Carl Raddatz
- Cinematography: Werner Krien
- Edited by: Gottfried Ritter
- Music by: Herbert Windt
- Production company: UFA
- Distributed by: UFA
- Release date: 21 March 1941
- Running time: 85 minutes
- Country: Nazi Germany
- Language: German

Above All Else in the World (German: Über alles in der Welt) is a 1941 German drama film directed by Karl Ritter and starring Paul Hartmann, Hannes Stelzer and Fritz Kampers. The title refers to the second line of the German national anthem. It was made as a propaganda film designed to promote Nazi Germany's war aims in the Second World War.

== Synopsis ==
Following the outbreak of war, Germans abroad face persecution from the British and French authorities.

== Cast ==
- Paul Hartmann as Otl. Steinhart
- Hannes Stelzer as Hans Wiegand
- Fritz Kampers as Fritz Möbius
- Carl Raddatz as Carl Wiegand
- Oskar Sima as Leo Samek
- Maria Bard as Madeleine LaRoche
- Berta Drews as Anna Möbius
- Carsta Löck as Erika Möbius
- Marina von Ditmar as Brigitte
- Joachim Brennecke as Willy Möbius
- Karl John as Olt. Hassencamp
- Josef Dahmen as Uffz. Weber
- Georg Thomalla as Uffz. Krause
- Herbert A.E. Böhme as Kapitän Hansen
- Wilhelm König as Funker Boysen
- Karl Haubenreißer as Sally Nürnberg
- Andrews Engelmann as Capt. John Stanley
- Hans Baumann as Robert Brown
- Ernst Sattler as Rainthaler
- Lutz Götz as Hofer
- Albert Janscheck as Reindl
- Marianne Straub as Walburga
- Peter Elsholtz as Dr. v. Krisis
- Kunibert Gensichen as Reg.-Ass. Glockenburg
- Eva Tinschmann as Oberschwester Isolde
- Oscar Sabo as Friedrich Wilhelm Hoppe
- Gerhard Dammann as Siemens-Werkmeister
- Beppo Brem as Putzenlechner
- Hermann Gunther as Elsässischer Bürgermeister
- Günther Polensen as Flieger-Leutnant Nacke
- Willi Rose
- Fanny Cotta
- Heinz Welzel
- Franz Lichtenauer
- Paul Schwed
- Herbert Scholz
- Wolfgang Molitor

== Bibliography ==
- Kreimeier, Klaus (1999). The Ufa Story: A History of Germany's Greatest Film Company, 1918–1945. Berkeley: University of California Press. ISBN 978-0-520-22069-0.
