= The Red Terror (film) =

1942 Nazi propaganda film by Karl Ritter

- German: GPU
- Directed by: Karl Ritter
- Written by: Andrews Engelmann; Felix Lützkendorf; Karl Ritter
- Produced by: Karl Ritter
- Cinematography: Igor Oberberg
- Edited by: Conrad von Molo
- Music by: Norbert Schultze; Herbert Windt
- Production company: UFA
- Distributed by: Deutsche Filmvertriebs
- Release date: 14 August 1942
- Running time: 99 minutes
- Country: Nazi Germany
- Language: German
- Budget: 1.849 million ℛℳ
- Box office: 3.5 million ℛℳ

The Red Terror (German: GPU) is a 1942 Nazi German propaganda film directed, co-written, and produced by Karl Ritter. It stars Italian actress Laura Solari as a Baltic German woman who works to undermine the Soviet secret police, in revenge for their killing of her family years earlier. Will Quadflieg, Marina von Ditmar, and Andrews Engelmann also starred.

Rushed into production shortly after German invasion of the USSR, The Red Terror is notable as one of the only overtly anti-Soviet films produced in the Third Reich.

== Plot ==
Olga Feodorwna, a Russian violin virtuoso of Baltic German descent, is the star guest at an event organized by the Riga branch of the "Women's International League for Peace and Freedom." The organization sanctimoniously proclaims its "completely apolitical" goals: including "total peace" and "freedom for all peoples."

In fact, the organization is a front for the Soviet secret service, whose sole aim is the infiltration and subversion of the world order. Olga only pretends to support the organization. In reality, she is plotting revenge against her parents' murderer, whom she believes to be a member of the secret service. The perpetrator is Nikolai Boksha, who has organized the assassinations of countless anti-Soviet dissidents. He has an Armenian revolutionary killed by a parcel bomb planted on him by the unsuspecting Baltic German student Peter Aßmus. The Armenian's secretary, Irina, is captured by the secret service as a suspected spy. She is handed over to Olga because the girl refuses to divulge any secret information. Olga flees with her via Rotterdam to Gothenburg, where they are joined by Peter, who has escaped from GPU custody.

Meanwhile, Olga continues to plot her revenge against Boksha. They meet again at the Soviet embassy in Helsinki, and it becomes clear that Boksha is attracted to her. Unwittingly, he reveals himself as the murderer of her family. They later meet in Paris, where Boksha reveals his plans for the future: he intends to move to a small house somewhere in Brittany and live out his retirement undetected under an assumed name – with Olga.

Olga denounces Boksha to the secret service as a double agent, and they subsequently eliminate him. She tthen reveals to her superior that revenge was her sole reason for working with the secret service and demands to be released from the organization. When the director refuses, she commits suicide.

Meanwhile, in Rotterdam, Irina and Peter are tracked down by the secret service and taken to the organization's torture chambers. Near death, they are rescued when the German army captures Rotterdam in 1940 and frees the prisoners.

== Cast ==
- Laura Solari as Olga Feodorowna
- Will Quadflieg as Peter Aßmuss
- Marina von Ditmar as Irina
- Andrews Engelmann as Nikolai Bokscha
- Karl Haubenreißer as Jakob Frunse
- Hans Stiebner as inquiry judge
- Maria Bard as head of women's league
- Helene von Schmithberg as Tante (Aunt) Ljuba
- Albert Lippert as hotel director in Kovno (Kaunas)
- Lale Andersen as singer in bar in Gothenburg
- Wladimir Majer as GPU chief
- Nico Turoff as Frunse's assistant
- Theo Shall as saboteur with Bokscha
- Horst Winter as singer: 1st variation on "Limehouse Blues"
- Ivo Veit as Soviet diplomat in Helsinki
- Freddie Brocksieper with his jazz combo
- Gösta Richter

== Production ==
Joseph Goebbels ordered UFA GmbH to start production on four anti-Soviet films in 1941. Andrews Engelmann came up with the idea for The Red Terror and wrote the script with Karl Ritter and Felix Lützkendorf. Production started in December 1941. It was the first anti-Soviet film by the Nazis since the Molotov–Ribbentrop Pact. It cost 1.849 million ℛℳ (equivalent to $8,000,000 in 2021) to produce.

The original German title refers to the name of the Soviet secret police agency the Joint State Political Directorate (OGPU), commonly known in Germany at the time as the 'GPU' (Note: GPU was the acronym of the OGPU's short-lived predecessor, the State Political Directorate. In Germany at the time, the two organizations were often conflated.).

== Release and reception ==
The film was approved by the censors on 17 July 1942, and premiered in Berlin on 14 August. It earned 3.5 million ℛℳ (equivalent to $15,000,000 in 2021) at the box office for a profit of 1.161 million ℛℳ (equivalent to $4,870,000 in 2021).

Post-war documentarian Erwin Leiser and scholar Jerzy Toeplitz considered the film ineffective propaganda.

== Availability ==
As of 2026, the film is part of the restricted collection of Nazi-era films held by the F.W. Murnau Foundation. A copy is also held by the United States Holocaust Memorial Museum.

== Works cited ==
- Welch, David (1983). Propaganda and the German Cinema: 1933-1945. I.B. Tauris. ISBN 9781860645204.
