= The Crew of the Dora =

1943 film

- Theatrical release poster
- Directed by: Karl Ritter
- Starring: Josef Dahmen; Hannes Stelzer
- Release date: 1943
- Country: Nazi Germany
- Language: German

The Crew of the Dora (German: Besatzung Dora) is a 1943 German film about Luftwaffe pilots. It depicts a love triangle involving two of them being overcome by their participation in battle together.

The film was banned in 1944, because of the worsening war situation; while on leave one character inspires a girl with hopes of settling in the east, a dream that no longer appeared possible.

== Cast ==
- Hannes Stelzer as Flugzeugführer Leutnant Joachim Krane
- Hubert Kiurina as Leutnant Franz von Borcke
- Josef Dahmen as Feldwebel Otto Roggenkamp
- Georg Thomalla as Bordschütze Unteroffizier Fritz Mott
- Ernst von Klipstein as Hauptmann Kurt Gillhausen
- Clemens Hasse as Oberleutnant Erich Krumbhaar
- Helmut Schabrich as Oberleutnant Semmler
- Wolfgang Preiss as Staffelarzt Dr. Wagner
- Suse Graf as Dr. Marianne Güldener
- Charlott Daudert as Mathilde Kronschnabel
- Carsta Löck as Straßenbahnschaffnerin Betty Schütte
- Roma Bahn as Laborantin Fräulein Bornschlegel
- Otz Tollen as Oberleutnant
- Ewald Wenck as Ober im Restaurant
