= Karl Ritter (director) =

German film producer and director

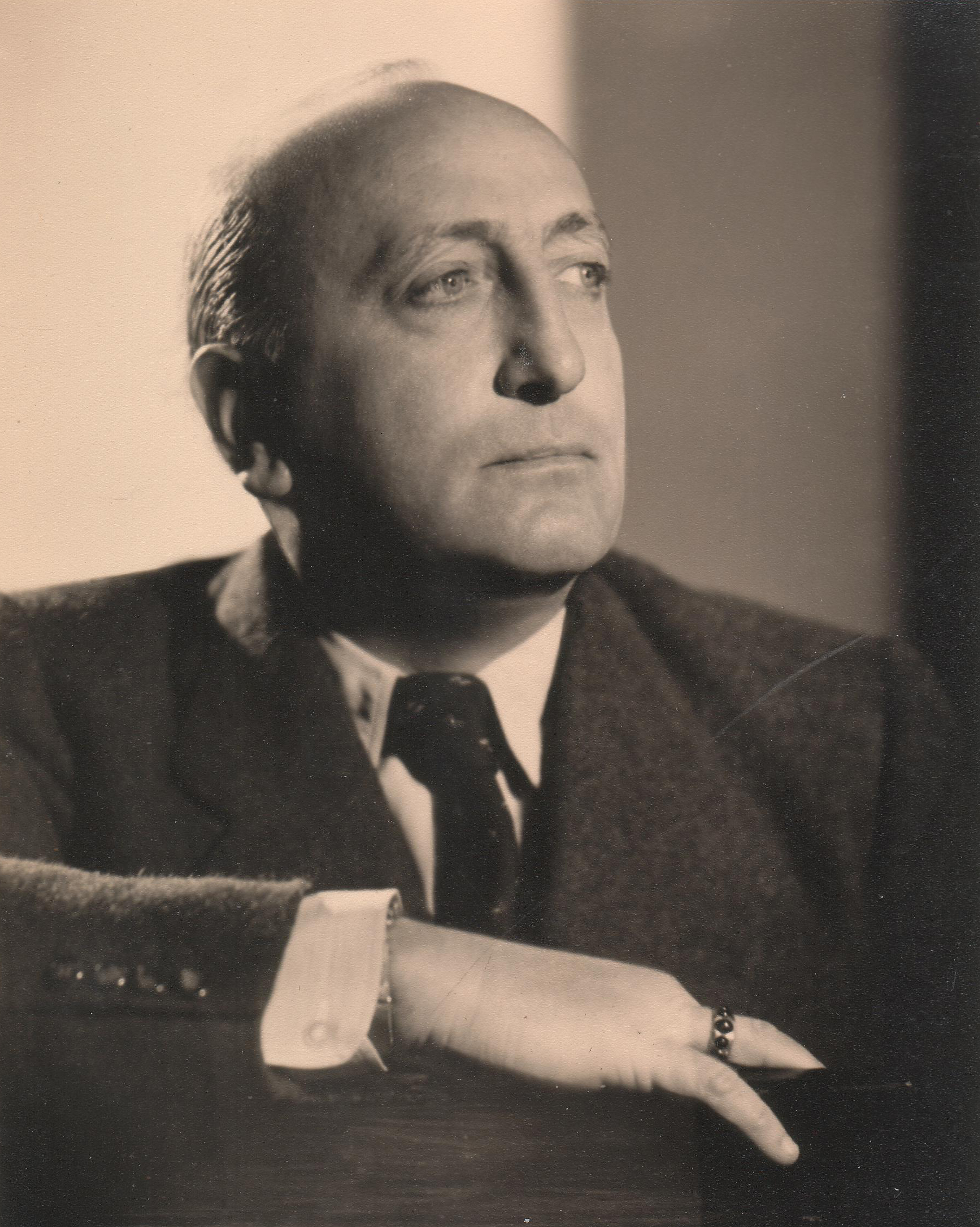
- Born: November 7, 1888; Würzburg, German Empire
- Died: April 7, 1977 (aged 88); Buenos Aires, Argentina
- Occupations: Film director, film producer
- Known for: Nazi propaganda films

Karl Ritter (7 November 1888 – 7 April 1977) was a German film producer and director responsible for many Nazi propaganda films. He had previously been one of the first German military pilots. He spent most of his later life in Argentina.

== Early life ==
Ritter was born in Würzburg. His father was a professor at the conservatoire; his mother was an opera singer. He was a career officer in the German military, built his own aeroplane and earned a pilot's licence in 1911 {#121}, and in World War I became one of the country's first military pilots. He was a lieutenant in the 1st Bavarian Pioneer Battalion.

After the war, he studied architecture, worked as a graphic artist and entered the film industry in 1926 as a public relations manager at Südfilm, where he edited a book of Walt Disney cartoons. In 1932, he directed a short film featuring Karl Valentin, a comedian.

== Third Reich ==
Ritter was a committed Nazi. His wife's father was distantly related to Richard Wagner. Ritter came into contact with Hitler through that connection and joined the party in the mid-1920s. After the Nazis had come to power, he moved from head of production at Reichsliga-Film in Munich to become a company director and chief of production at Universum Film AG (UFA). He was the producer of Hitlerjunge Quex among other important Nazi propaganda films. His directorial work for the regime includes entertainment films imitating Hollywood productions like Hochszeitsreise (1939) and Bal paré (1940), but he is best known for his propaganda films: anticommunist films such as The Red Terror (1942) and above all his military films, which were peacetime films with a World War I context with the 1937-1938 trilogy of Patrioten, Unternehmen Michael and Urlaub auf Ehrenwort and Pour le Mérite (1938)—and Zeitfilme (contemporary films) made after the start of World War II such as Stukas (1942). The latter type he largely invented, as a Nazi counter to the Russian revolutionary film, and can be seen as beginning with Verräter (1936), which for the first time brought the German spy film home to Germany.

Ritter himself clearly outlined his purpose as a film maker in terms of Nazi ideology: "The path of German films will lead without any compromise to the conclusion that every movie must stay in the service of our community, of nation and our Führer." "My movies deal with the unimportance of the individual—all that is personal must be given up for our cause". He called his propaganda films "pictorial armo[u]red car[s]" which formed a "first line of the propaganda front" while "the rest" (entertainment films) he relegated to behind the lines. When officers in the military queried the wisdom of the strategy depicted in Unternehmen Michael in which an entire infantry column chooses a heroic death to take the enemy with them in a hail of artillery fire, he responded, "I want to show the German youth that senseless, sacrificial death has its moral value". The Propaganda Ministry dismissed the radio play with which the military attempted to rebut Ritter's film. His work includes some of the most important Nazi propaganda films. Verräter had its première at the 1936 Party Rally; in 1938 Das Schwarze Korps hailed Pour le Mérite as "the best thing we [have] ever seen"; and his series of World War II films constitute the "apogee" of the Nazi war film. However, when events overtook them, one of his films, Kadetten (completed 1939, released 1941) had to be shelved for two years and three either had to be abandoned or could not be released: Legion Condor when the war began, Besatzung Dora when the promise of land in the East for German settlers became hollow (and when the German forces had to withdraw from North Africa, a major setting of the film) and Narvik when the project was opposed by the military and then transferred to Veit Harlan. In 1943, he was ordered to cease directing films.

Ritter became one of the most important directors of propaganda films. He was rewarded by Joseph Goebbels with membership in the governing body of the Reichsfilmkammer, the chamber governing the film industry; a position as a cultural senator; and, in honour of Hitler's 50th birthday in 1939, a professorship. He was on Hermann Göring's list of party members exempt from the military call-up but returned to the Luftwaffe. Taken prisoner by the Soviets, he escaped to Bavaria.

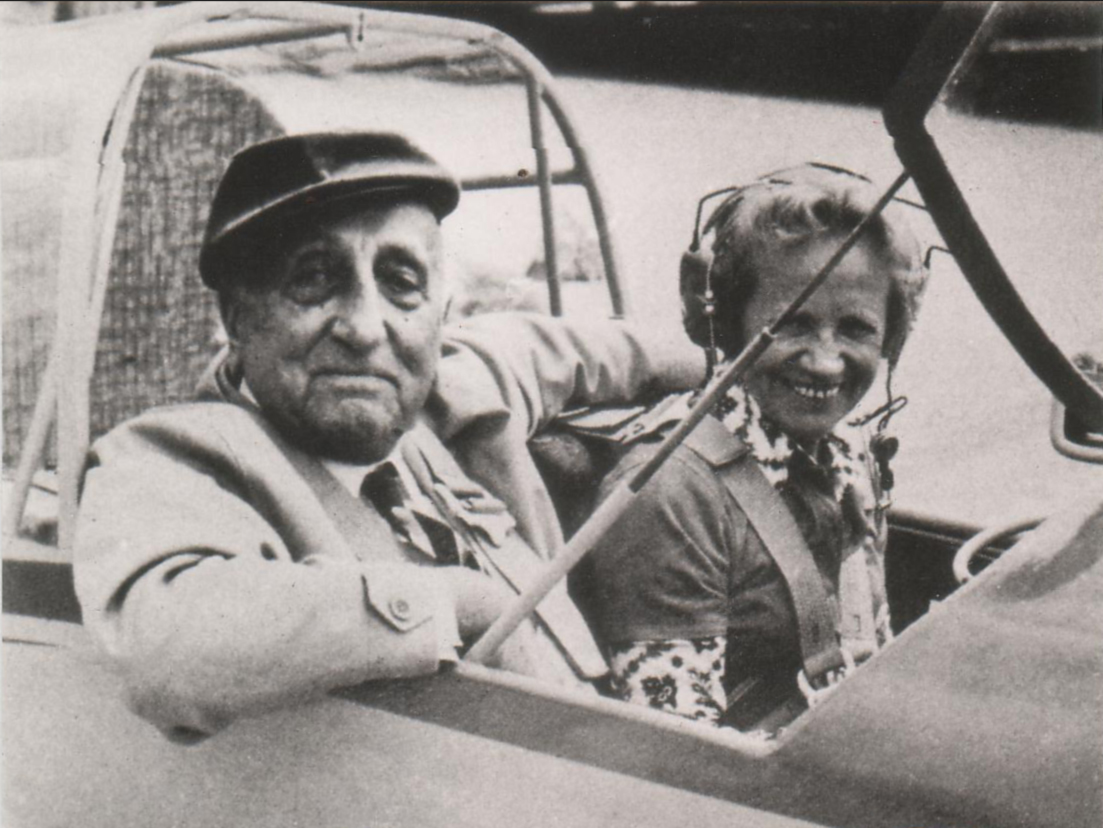
Ritter with Hanna Reitsch in a Scheibe Falke, 1968

=== Postwar ===
After the end of World War II, Ritter was declared a "follower" (Mitläufer) at his de-Nazification trial. (Note: Hull wrote that he managed to avoid trial: p. 174.) In 1947, he emigrated to Argentina via Portugal; (Note: According to Giesen, p. 257, and The Concise Cinegraph, 1949.) there, thanks to Winifred Wagner, he was able to make El Paraiso. In the 1950s, he returned to West Germany, ran his own production company there and declared a wish "to restore the strength of the German cinema", but his project of remaking Pandora's Box fell through, and he returned to Argentina and died in 1977 in Buenos Aires.

== Style, reception and modern assessment ==
Beginning with Pour le Mérite, Ritter's films are characteristically fast-moving and episodic. He prepared them in detail using storyboards. He also tends to rowdy humour; in his diary, Goebbels wrote that Ritter "makes nationalistic points with a lack of inhibition that would make others blush" but also noted his heavy touch, writing of Bal paré (1940): "Ritter is not suited to subtle psychological portrayal. He is more for hearty things". As a result, he is not highly regarded today. David Stewart Hull, in his 1969 overview of Nazi films, characterised Ritter's work as "heavy-handed and extremely talky" and described Pour le Mérite as "a crushing bore" and Stukas as "ha[ving] all his worst vices: blatant propaganda, slapdash production values, crude editing, and a terrible script" but paid GPU a compliment: "The technical work is less slap-dash than usual and the acting considerably above Ritter's usual low level". (In contrast, David Welch, in his 1983 study of German film propaganda, states that in GPU, "Ritter portrayed the enemy in such a transparent and unreal way that even German cinema audiences failed to be convinced.... [T]he actors' wildly exaggerated gestures are totally unconvincing". He regards the portrayal of the torturers as so ridden with "simplistic [clichés] that the propaganda loses all credibility".) Karsten Witte summed him up in his overview, which was first published in 1993, as someone who "directed bad action films on a conveyor belt". Rainer Rother wrote in his 2003 study of Stukas of "pure inability" and "lack of artistic sensibility". At the time, however, most of Ritter's films were successful. He was "one of the best known and best paid directors in the Third Reich". The Polish film historian Jerzy Toeplitz wrote: "If Karl Ritter had had better screenplays... and if he had been more aware of the dangers of declamatory dialogue, his works would have gained immensely. They are lively and usually interesting but lack artistic profundity. They never go beyond rather loud, importunate propaganda". John Altmann estimated that 6 million young boys had seen and been influenced by his films between 1936 and 1939. His Zeitfilme such as Stukas have been provocatively seen as forerunners of modern military thrillers such as Roland Emmerich's 1996 Independence Day.

== Filmography ==
- 1928: When the Guard Marches (scriptwriter)
- 1929: Come Back, All Is Forgiven (scriptwriter)
- 1930: Fräulein Lausbub (scriptwriter)
- 1931: Der Zinker (producer)
- 1932: Must We Get Divorced? (producer)
- 1932: Melodie der Liebe (producer)
- 1932: Im Photoatelier (director)
- 1932: Die verkaufte Braut (producer)
- 1933: Rivalen der Luft. Ein Segelfliegerfilm (line producer)
- 1933: Love Must Be Understood (producer, line producer)
- 1933: Hitlerjunge Quex (line producer)
- 1934: Decoy (line producer)
- 1934: Love, Death and the Devil (producer, line producer)
- 1934: Enjoy Yourselves (line producer)
- 1935: The Foolish Virgin (line producer)
- 1935: The Island (line producer)
- 1935: The Royal Waltz (line producer)
- 1935: Marriage Strike (line producer)
- 1936: The Last Four on Santa Cruz (line producer)
- 1936: Women's Regiment (director, line producer)
- 1936: Verräter (director, producer, line producer)
- 1937: Urlaub auf Ehrenwort (director, producer, line producer)
- 1937: Unternehmen Michael (scriptwriter, director, line producer)
- 1937: Patrioten (concept, co-scripter, director, producer, line producer)
- 1938: Pour le Mérite (scriptwriter, director, line producer))
- 1938: Capriccio (director, line producer)
- 1939: The Wedding Trip (scriptwriter, director, line producer)
- 1939: Im Kampf gegen den Weltfeind (director, line producer)
- 1939: Legion Condor (scriptwriter, director, line producer)
- 1939: Cadets (scriptwriter, director, line producer)
- 1940: Bal paré (scriptwriter, director, line producer)
- 1941: Stukas (scriptwriter, director, line producer)
- 1941: ...Über alles in der Welt (scriptwriter, director, producer, line producer)
- 1942: The Red Terror (scriptwriter, director, line producer)
- 1943: Besatzung Dora (scriptwriter, director, line producer)
- 1944: Love Letters (line producer)
- 1944: Summer Nights (director, line producer)
- 1945: Kamerad Hedwig (line producer)
- 1945: Erzieherin gesucht (line producer)
- 1945: Das Leben geht weiter (line producer) (unfinished film)
- 1948: El Paraiso (producer, director)
- 1950: Who Drove the Grey Ford? (producer)
- 1953: Paradise
- 1954: Prosecutor Corda (scriptwriter, director)
- 1954: Ball of Nations (scriptwriter, director)
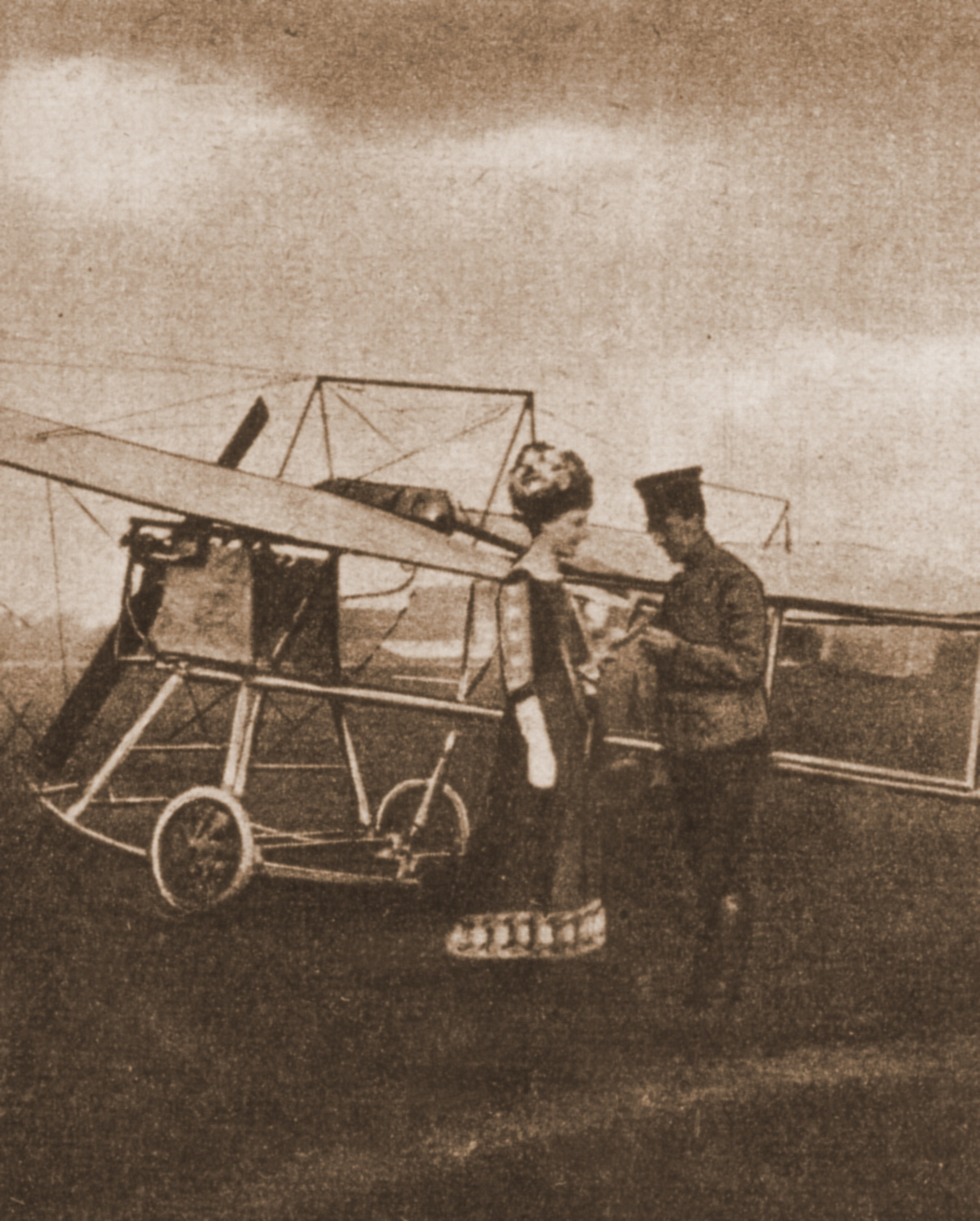
Ritter as a young officer with wife Erika after passing his pilot's examination, 30 September 1911

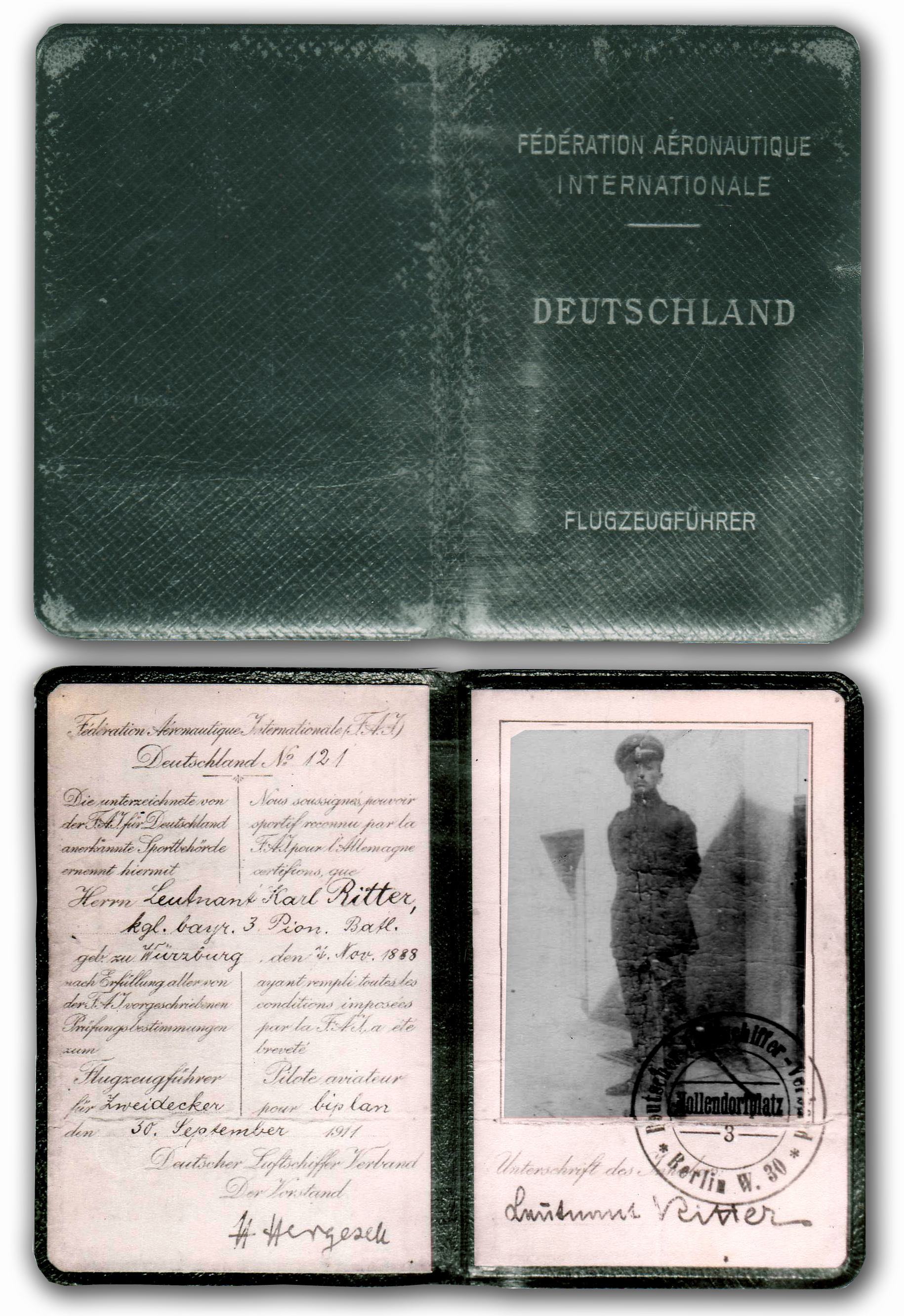
Ritter's pilot's licence, Germany no. 121

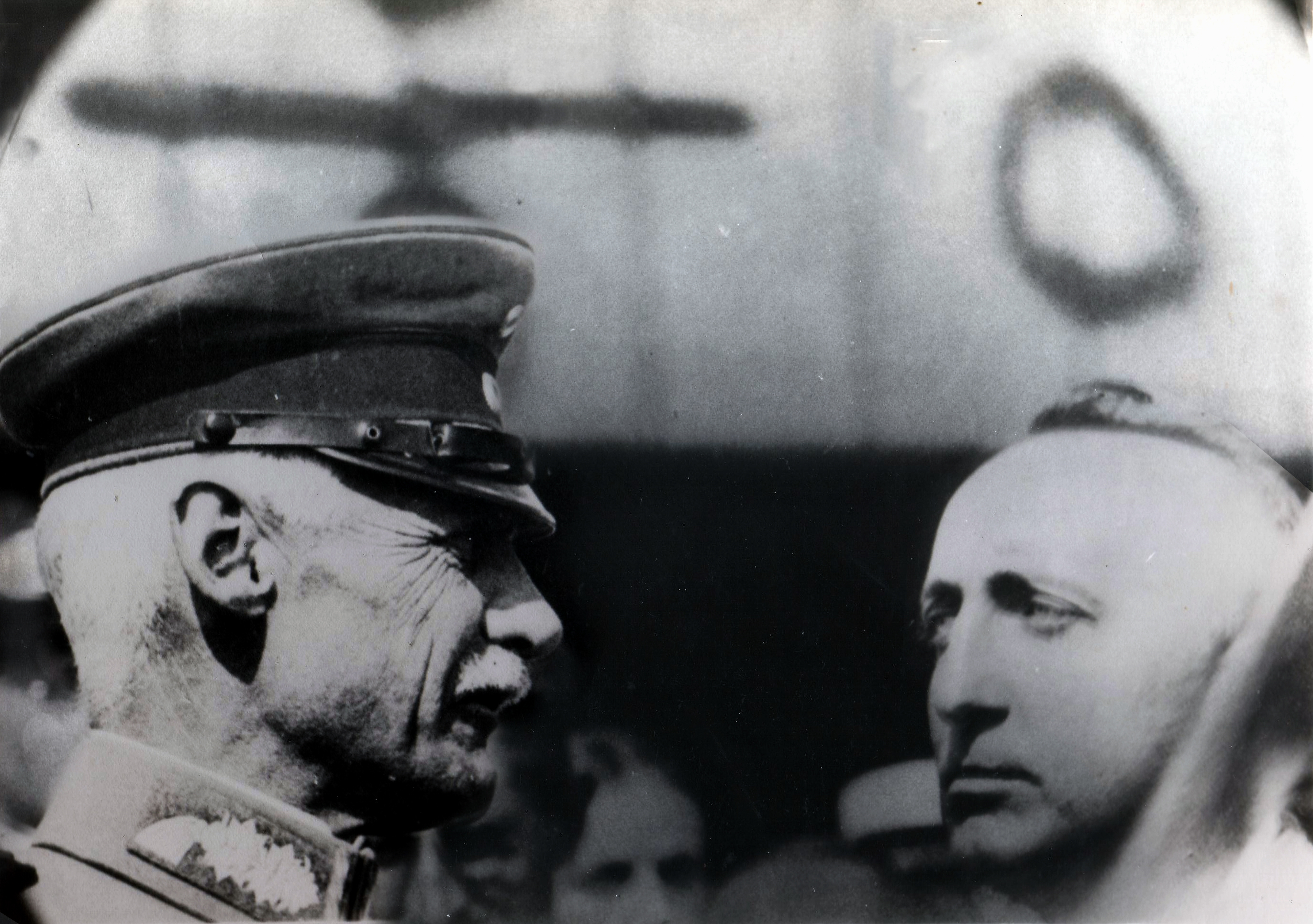
Ritter with Rupprecht, Crown Prince of Bavaria, in 1916
