= 1782 in Russia =

Events from the year 1782 in Russia

== Incumbents ==
- Monarch – Catherine II

== Events ==
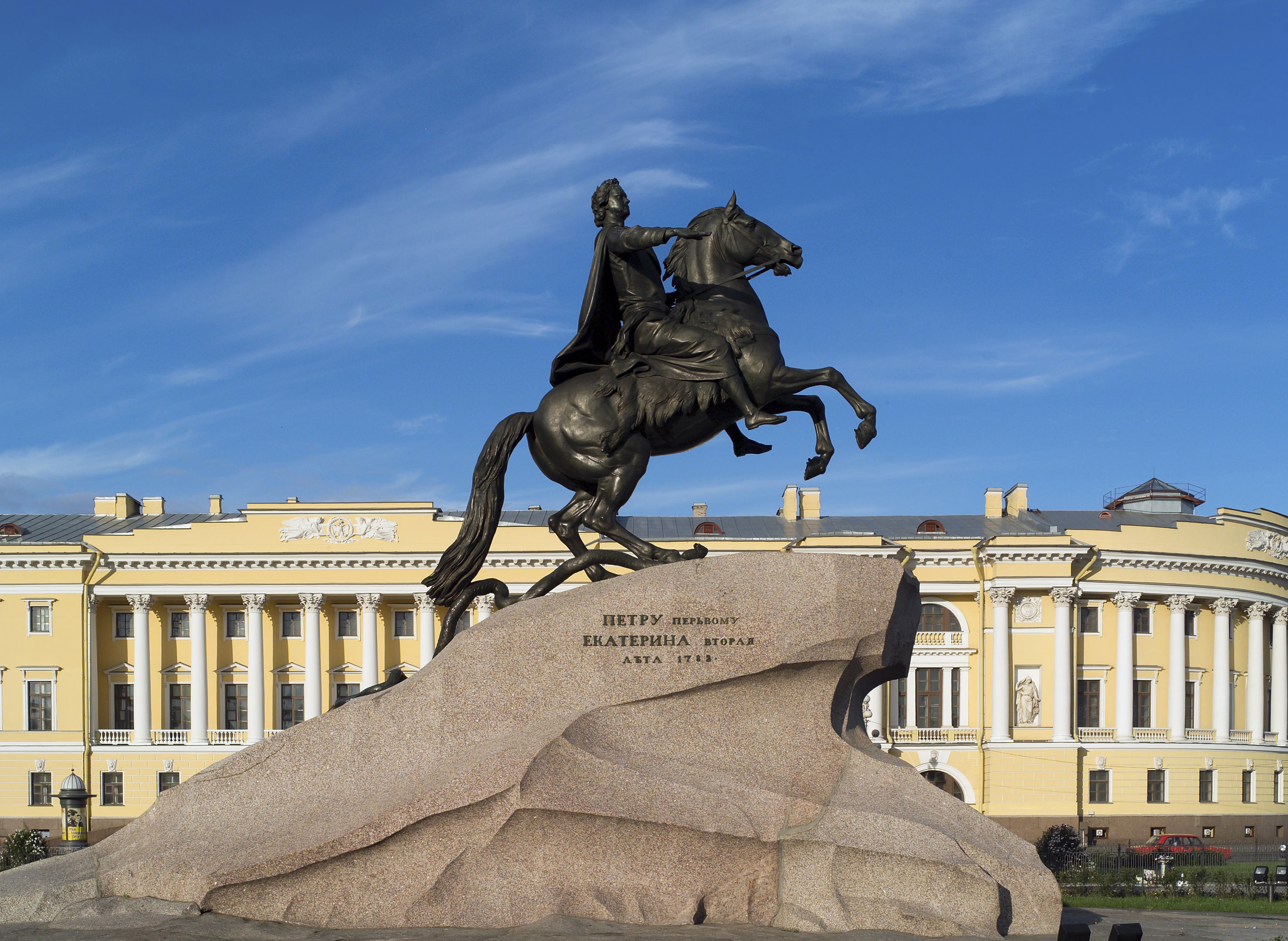
The Bronze Horseman (St. Petersburg, Russia)

- Bronze Horseman, sculpture of Peter the Great, unveiled in St. Petersburg
- Greek Church and Greek School (Taganrog) - church consecrated
- The Minor (Fonvizin play) first performed
- Order of Saint Vladimir established
- Siberia Governorate, Orenburg Governorate, and others dissolved as part of a general administrative reorganization

== Births ==
- Stepan Andreyevskiy - general
- Constantine IV, Prince of Mukhrani - Georgian nobleman, Russian general
- Philaret Drozdov - Russian Orthodox Metropolitan of Moscow
- Yevgeny Golovin - general
- Afanasy Grigoriev - architect
- Pyotr Kotlyarevsky - hero of the Russo-Turkish War and Russo-Persian War
- Vasili Krasovsky - writer
- Orest Kiprensky - portrait artist
- Yakov Kolokolnikov-Voronin - artist
- Valerian Madatov - Armenian prince, Russian general
- Pavel Martynov - general
- Ivan Paskevich - general
- Konstantin Poltoratsky - general
- Sophie Swetchine - mystic
- Prince Teimuraz of Georgia - scholar and historian
- Fyodor Ivanovich Tolstoy - nobleman and traveller
- Georg Andreas von Rosen - general
- Ferdinand von Tiesenhausen - nobleman and soldier
- Alexander Varnek - portrait artist
- Mikhail Semyonovich Vorontsov - general

== Deaths ==
- Elizabeth Antonovna of Brunswick - member of the Russian royal family
- Vasily Dolgorukov-Krymsky - general and Governor-General of Moscow
- Vasily Neyolov - architect
