= Klawans =

Klawans is a surname. Notable people with the surname include:

- David Klawans (born 1968), American film producer
- Harold L. Klawans (1937–1998), American academic neurologist
- Stuart Klawans, American film critic
