= Audience superior position =

Audience superior position is a term in literary theory to describe when the audience of a narrative work knows more than one or more characters in the narrative work. An example in film might be when the audience knows the killer is hiding in the closet while the protagonist does not.

Another example of audience superior position is the use of dramatic irony. For instance, the audience may know Oedipus is headed for a tragic ending before Oedipus himself does.

Audience superior may also be used for foreshadowing or dramatic tension. The audience is aware there is a shark in the film Jaws long before the protagonists accept this fact.

== Audience inferior position ==
Audience inferior position is when the audience knows less than one or more of the characters in a narrative work. A key example is in murder mysteries, when the detective solves the crime before the audience. If the audience were to solve the crime before the detective, the audience would likely lose all interest in following the story.

== Audience equal position ==
Much of the time in narrative works, the audience knows exactly as much as the characters they are following, and are not given more or less information by the author.

== See also ==
- Foreshadowing
