= Chekhov Monument, Rostov-on-Don =

Monument in Russia

Chekhov Monument
- Russian: Памятник А. П. Чехову (Ростов-на-Дону)
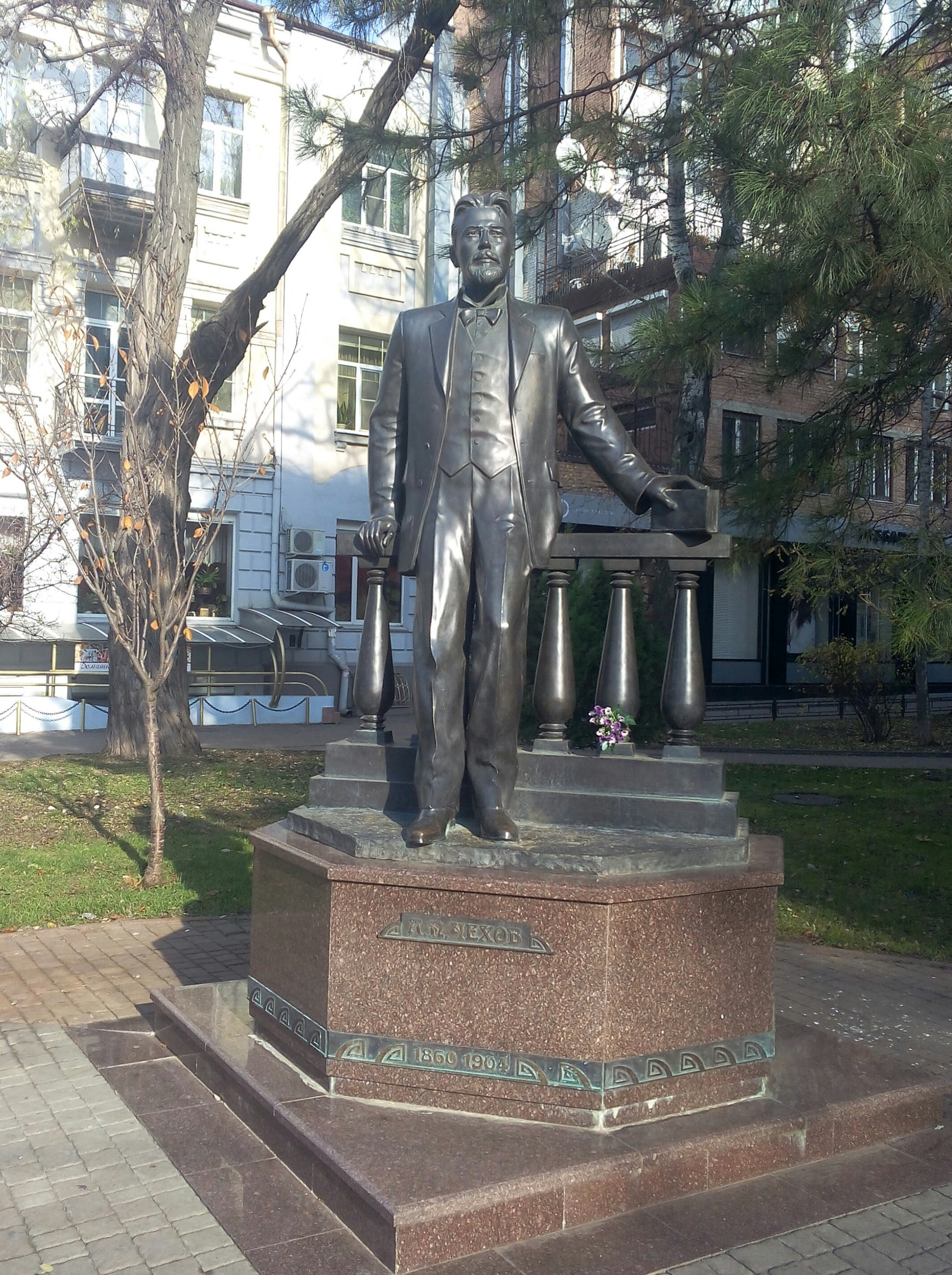
- Interactive map of Chekhov Monument
- Location: Rostov-on-Don, Russia
- Coordinates: 47°13′37″N 39°43′22″E
- Designer: Anatoly Sknarin
- Material: bronze
- Height: 2.5 m (8 ft 2 in)
- Opening date: 28 January 2010
- Dedicated to: Anton Chekhov

The Chekhov Monument (Russian: Памятник А. П. Чехову) in Rostov-on-Don, Russia, is a bronze monument erected in 2010 to commemorate the 150th anniversary of the birth of the Russian writer Anton Chekhov. The monument is located at the intersection of Chekhov Street and Pushkinskaya Street.

== History ==
Monuments to Anton Pavlovich Chekhov have been erected in several Russian cities: in Moscow, Taganrog, Yuzhno-Sakhalinsk, Krasnoyarsk, Tomsk and other smaller settlements. The idea of creating a monument to Chekhov in Rostov-on-Don was conceived in the spring of 2010. The artist is the famous Rostov sculptor Anatoly Sknarin. He created a sculpture of the writer based on archival photographs.

The location of the monument was not immediately determined. Several options were considered, such as the area near the Maksimov House at the intersection of Stanislavsky and Semashko streets, near the Book House on Budennovsky Prospekt and on Pushkinskaya Street near the Don State Public Library. But the location eventually decided on by the committee was at the intersection of Pushkinskaya and Chekhov streets, where the statue was unveiled on 28 January 2010. The height of the monument is 2.5 meters. The weight of the sculpture is about one ton.
