= Greek Church and Greek School (Taganrog) =

The Greek Church of Sts Constantine and Helena
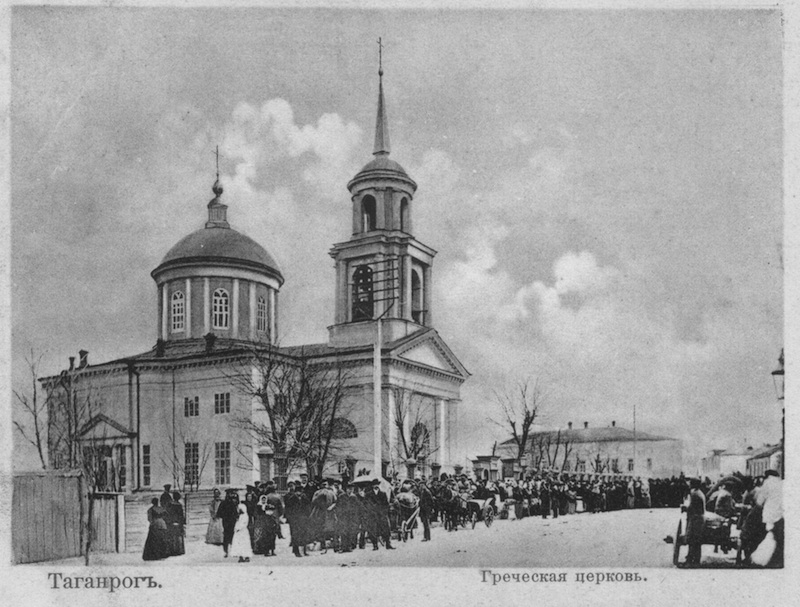
- The Greek church (Sts Constantine and Helena church) on an old postcard

Religion
- Affiliation: Greek Orthodox
- Status: Demolished in 1938

Location
- Location: Taganrog, Russia
- Interactive map of The Greek Church of Sts Constantine and Helena
- Coordinates: 47°12′43″N 38°56′20″E

Architecture
- Completed: 1830

The Greek School
- Греческая школа

Location
- Ulitsa Grecheskaya, 54; Rostov Oblast; Taganrog; Russia
- 47°12′43″N 38°56′20″E

Information
- Type: parochial school
- Religious affiliation: Greek Orthodox
- Patron saints: Saint Constantine and Saint Helena
- Opened: 1862
- Closed: 1882
- Graduates: Anton Chekhov, Nikolai Chekhov
- Affiliation: The Church of the Saint Constantine and Saint Helena in Taganrog

The Greek Church of Sts Constantine and Helena (Russian: Церковь Константина и Елены), also known as the Greek Church and Greek School, was a Greek Orthodox church and school located in Taganrog, Russia from 1781 to 1938.

== History of the Greek Church ==
The construction of the Greek Church in Taganrog was started in 1781 and the church was already consecrated by March 1782, with the first service held by the priest Nikita Aguros. When leaving Taganrog in 1826, the Empress consort of All the Russias Elizabeth Alexeievna (Louise of Baden) left the church money for a reconstruction. In 1830, a new stone church was built to replace the wooden one. The public worship was made in both Russian and Greek. In 1855, the Cossacks and the volunteer corps repulsed the attack of the British and French landing party from the territory of the church during the Siege of Taganrog.

The Greek Church was shut down in 1938 by Soviet authorities and was demolished soon after. In the 1940s, an apartment block was built on the site of the church.

== Greek School ==
The wooden building behind the Greek church was built in early 19th century, and was later covered with bricks. In the early 19th century the building was used by the Greek city council, which co-existed with the Municipal city council. In the 1850s the building was returned to the Greek church, and in 1862 was opened as a parochial school for preparation of choristers.

The Greek school was financed by the Greek Church of Taganrog and by rich Greek merchants. Among the disciplines were Greek language, theology, mathematics, history, calligraphy, and singing. In 1882 the building was given back to the clergy of the Greek church

Anton Chekhov attended the school in 1866-1868, until at the age of eight he was sent to the Gymnasium for Boys.

After the October Revolution, the building was given to the families of factory workers, and the front and layout of the former school were completely changed.

== Photos ==
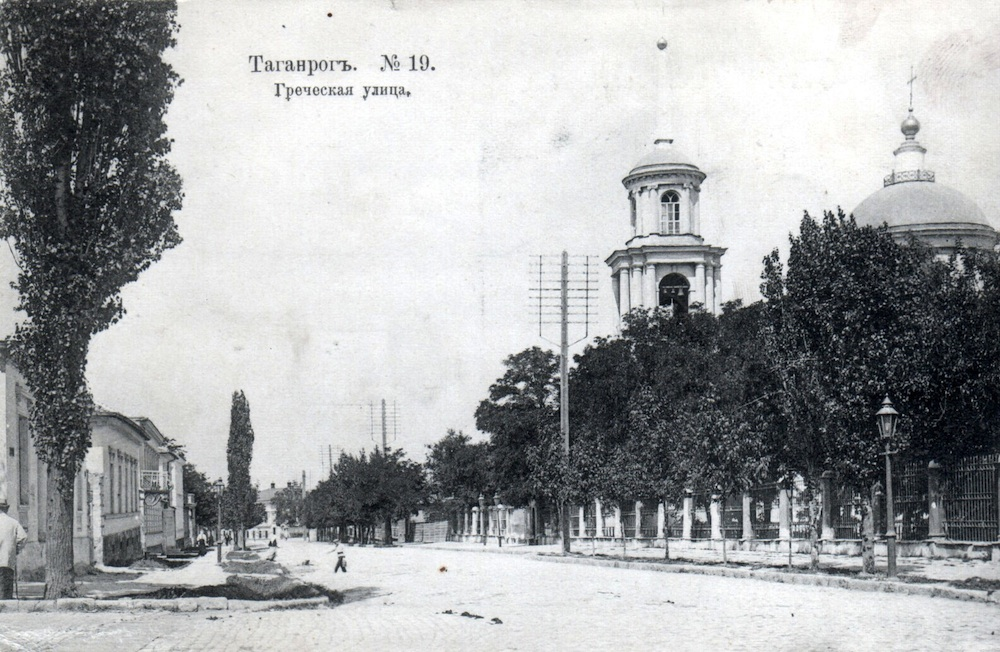
The Greek Street (Ulitsa Grecheskaya) in Taganrog with Greek Church of Sts Constantine and Helena on the right

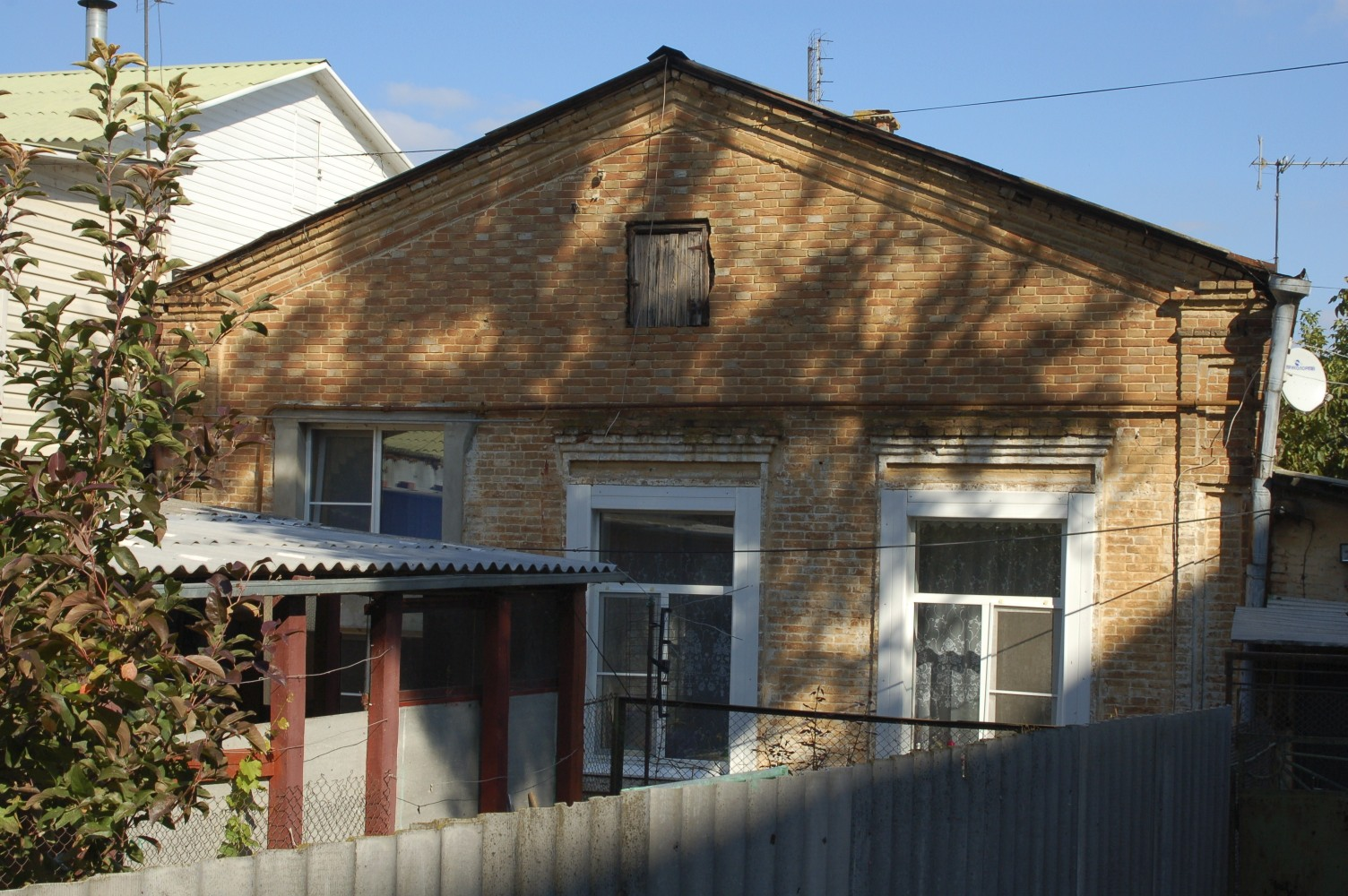
The former Greek school (photo of 2008)

== External links and references ==
- Чеховские места в Таганроге. Путеводитель. Таганрог, 2004

Greek Chapel, Southern Russia/* фотограф - Уилльям Рау. автор текста Кэрил Пэрротт. Слайд №11 "Греческая часовня на Юге России".
