= Chekhov's gun =

Dramatic principle

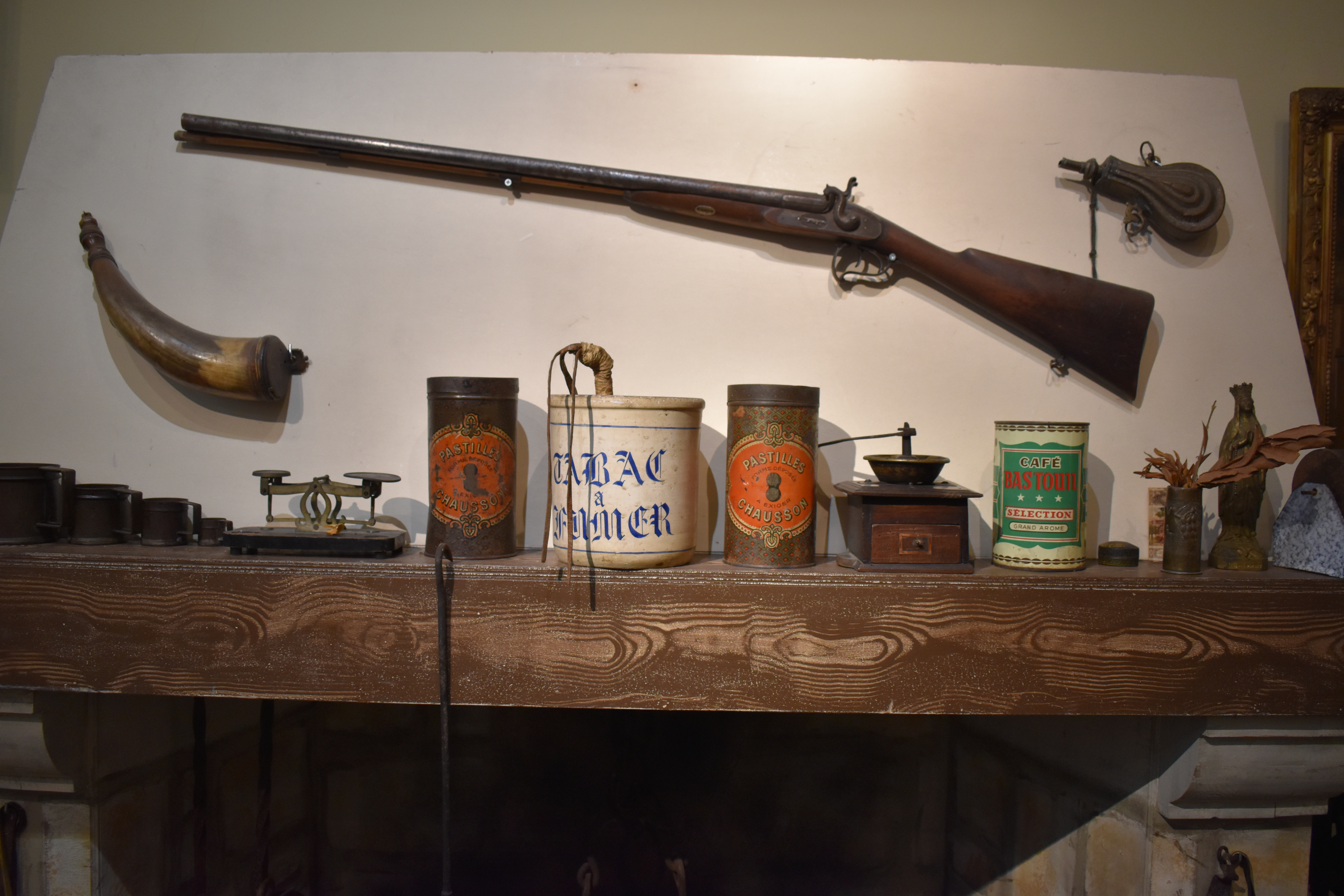
A shotgun on display

Chekhov's gun (or Chekhov's rifle; Russian: Чеховское ружьё, romanized: Chekhovskoye ruzhyo) is a narrative principle emphasizing that every element in a story should be necessary, while irrelevant elements should be removed. For example, if a gun is included in a story, there must be a reason for it, such as being fired at some later point. The principle that all elements must eventually come into play over the course of the story is recorded, with some variation, in several letters by Anton Chekhov, as advice for young playwrights.

In recent years, the term has also taken on the meaning of a plot element that is introduced early in a story, whose significance to the plot does not become clear until later. This plot twist meaning is separate from Chekhov's original intent of narrative conservation and necessity.

== Examples ==
- In Act I of Arthur Miller's play A View from the Bridge, Eddie slices an apple with his pocket-knife. In Act II, Eddie is stabbed to death with the same knife.
- The principle is carried out in many of the James Bond films, in which the spy is presented with new gadgets at the beginning of a mission — such as a concealed, wrist-activated dart gun in Moonraker — and typically each device serves a vital role in the story. The principle dictates that only the devices utilized later in the story may be presented.
- In the 1986 film Aliens, the main character Ellen Ripley is shown operating a power suit that helps move heavy equipment on the spaceship in the first act. In the last act when Newt is cornered by a Queen Xenomorph, she is saved when Ripley uses the power suit to fight off the Queen alien.
- In the 1994 film The Shawshank Redemption, Andy Dufresne asks Red to smuggle a small rock hammer into the prison in the first act. In the final act, it's revealed that Andy used the rock hammer to slowly and secretly dig a hole out of the prison and escape.

== Variations ==
Ernest J. Simmons writes that Chekhov repeated the same point, which may account for there being several variations.

- "One must never place a loaded rifle on the stage if it isn't going to go off. It's wrong to make promises you don't mean to keep."
- "Remove everything that has no relevance to the story. If you say in the first act that there is a rifle hanging on the wall, in the second or third act it absolutely must go off. If it's not going to be fired, it shouldn't be hanging there." — Sergius Shchukin (1911) Memoirs.
- "If in the first act you have hung a pistol on the wall, then in the following one it should be fired. Otherwise don't put it there."

Writing in 1999, Donald Rayfield noted that in Chekhov's play The Cherry Orchard, contrary to Chekhov's own advice, there are two loaded firearms that are not fired. The unfired rifles tie into the play's theme of lacking or incomplete action.

== Criticism ==
Ernest Hemingway mocked the principle in his essay "The art of the short story", giving the example of two characters who are introduced and then never mentioned again in his short story "Fifty Grand". Hemingway valued inconsequential details, but conceded that readers will inevitably seek symbolism and significance in them. Writer Andrea Phillips argued that assigning a single role for every detail makes a story predictable and leaves it "colorless".

== See also ==
- Concision – the principle of brevity in writing
- Foreshadowing – a plot device where what is to come is hinted at, to arouse interest or to guard against disappointment
- MacGuffin – a plot motivator that is necessary to the plot and the motivation of the characters, but insignificant, unimportant, or irrelevant in itself
- Occam's razor – the idea that explanatory mechanisms should not be posited without being necessary.
- Red herring – drawing attention to a certain element to mislead
- Shaggy dog story – a long-winded anecdote designed to lure the audience into a false sense of expectation, only to disappoint them with an anticlimactic ending or punchline.
- Deus ex machina – a plot element introduced unexpectedly to resolve an otherwise unsolvable situation
