= Alan Twigg =

Canadian writer, publisher, and biographer

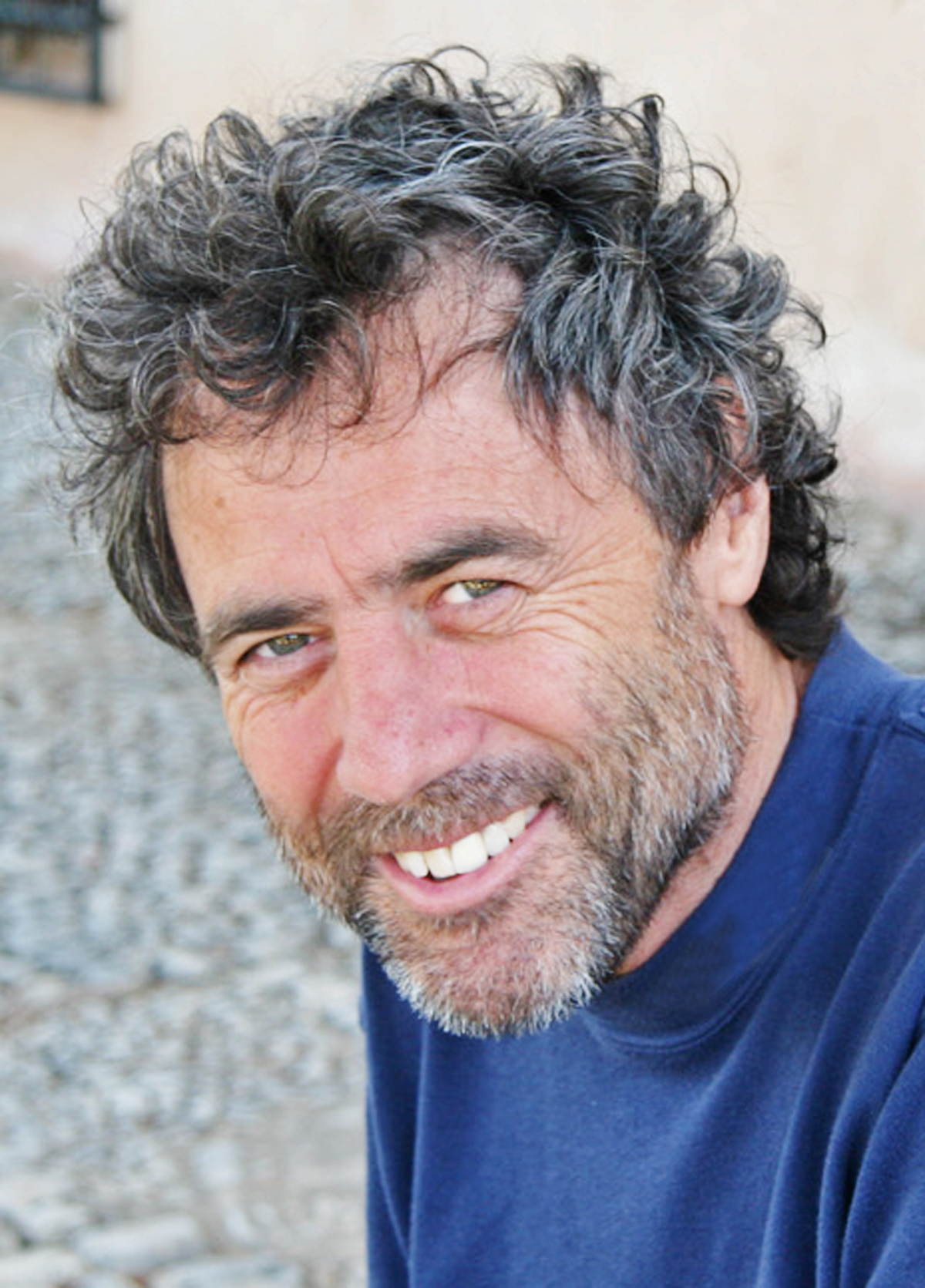

Alan Twigg, CM has received the Order of Canada, as a prolific journalist, historian, biographer, website-builder, film maker, community-builder and athlete. He created Canada's most-read, independent publication about books, BC Bookworld, a trade newspaper for the British Columbia book publishing industry and served as its publisher and main writer for thirty-three years until he gave the business away in 2020. He also founded or co-founded many of the province's major literary awards. When he was accorded an honorary doctorate by Simon Fraser University in 2022, SFU described him as British Columbia's leading man of letters. He also developed ABCBookWorld, an online encyclopedia of British Columbia authors. He is also a recipient of the Lieutenant Governor's Award for Literary Excellence in 2016.

== Early life and career ==
Twigg was born in 1952 in North Vancouver, British Columbia. He began freelance writing in the 1970s, and helped found the B.C. Book Prize in 1985. In the 1980s and 1990s, he wrote columns and reviews for the Vancouver Sun, the Globe and Mail, Quill and Quire, and the Toronto Star, as well as publishing books on the literature of Vancouver, British Columbian, Belizean, and Cuban history, the Dalai Lama, and soccer, among other topics. In 1987, he started BC Bookworld, a quarterly trade newspaper focused on British Columbia-based books and authors, both fiction and non-fiction. It is Canada's largest circulation book-related publication. He published it for 33 years before giving it away. He also created and wrote a massive reference site called ABCBookWorld, for and about more than 12,000 British Columbia authors, hosted by Simon Fraser University Library (until 2020).

== Accolades ==
In 2022, he was accorded a Doctorate of Literature from Simon Fraser University. Simon Fraser University described him as British Columbia's leading man of letters when it accorded an honorary doctorate.

That same year he published Out of Hiding: Holocaust Literature of British Columbia and created the world's foremost website for and about the Holocaust whistleblower Rudolf Vrba (www.rudolfvrba.com).

He won a gold medal for Canada at the World Masters Games in Turin, Italy, in 2007, for Over-50s soccer.

== Books ==
Twigg has written more than 20 books on a wide variety of subjects, from British Columbia literary history to biographies and travel journals.

Author or co-author

- Out of Hiding: Holocaust Literature of British Columbia (Ronsdale, 2022).
- Gidal: Letters and Photos, the Unusual Friendship of Yosef Wosk and Tim Gidal (Douglas & McIntyre, 2021)
- Moon Madness: Dr. Louise Aall, Sixty Years of Healing in Africa (Ronsdale, 2019)
- Undaunted: The Best of BC BookWorld (Ronsdale, 2013).
- The Essentials: 150 Great B.C. Books & Authors (Ronsdale, 2010).
- Tibetans in Exile: The Dalai Lama & The Woodcocks (Ronsdale, 2009).
- Full-Time: A Soccer Story (Douglas Gibson Books, McClelland & Stewart, 2008).
- Thompson's Highway: British Columbia's Fur Trade, 1800-1850 (Ronsdale, 2006).
- Understanding Belize: A Historical Guide (Harbour 2006).
- Aboriginality: The Literary Origins of British Columbia (Ronsdale 2005).
- First Invaders: The Literary Origins of British Columbia (Ronsdale 2004).
- 101 Top Historical Sites of Cuba (Beach Holme 2004).
- Intensive Care: A Memoir (Anvil Press 2002).
- Cuba: A Concise History for Travellers (Harbour, 2004; Penguin Books 2002; Bluefield Books 2000).
- Twigg's Directory of 1001 BC Writers (Crown Publications 1992).
- Strong Voices: Conversations with 50 Canadian Writers (Harbour 1988).
- Vander Zalm, From Immigrant to Premier: A Political Biography (Harbour 1986).
- Vancouver and Its Writers (Harbour 1986).
- Hubert Evans: The First Ninety-Three Years (Harbour 1985).
- For Openers: Conversations with 24 Canadian Writers (Harbour 1981).

Editor

- Tolstoy's Words to Live By (Ronsdale, 2020). Translated and edited by Peter Sekerin and Alan Twigg.

Contributor

- Memories of Chekhov: Accounts of the Writer from His Family, Friends and Contemporaries (Jefferson, North Carolina: McFarland Press, 2011). Edited and translated by Peter Sekirin; Introduction by Alan Twigg
- Conversations with Allen Ginsberg (University Press of Mississippi 2019). Edited by David Stephen Calonne
- Uncommon Ground: A Celebration of Matt Cohen (Knopf 2002). Edited by Wayne Grady, Graeme Gibson, Dennis Lee, and Priscila Uppal.
- Take This Waltz: A Celebration of Leonard Cohen (The Muses Company 1994)
- Margaret Atwood, Conversations (Firefly 1990)
- Conversations with Robertson Davies (University Press of Mississippi 1989)
