= Nikolai Chekhov =

Russian painter (1858–1889)

- Николай Чехов
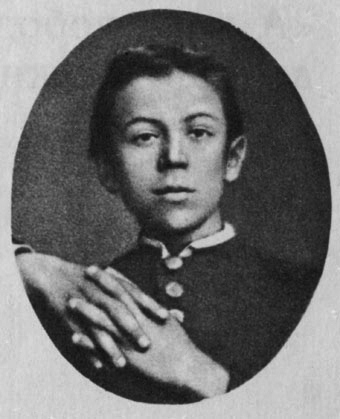
- Portrait, c. 1870
- Born: May 23, 1858; Taganrog, Russian Empire
- Died: June 29, 1889 (aged 31); Kharkov Governorate, Russian Empire (now Ukraine)
- Education: Moscow School of Painting, Sculpture and Architecture

Nikolai Pavlovich Chekhov (Russian: Николай Павлович Чехов; May 23, 1858 – June 29, 1889) was a Russian painter. He was a brother of Anton Chekhov.

== Biography ==
As a child Chekhov showed talents for art and music. He attended the Moscow School of Painting, Sculpture and Architecture. He was unable to finish his studies due to chronic alcoholism and the periods of time, often weeks, which he would spend living in the Moscow streets.

Chekhov was a talented artist, and he often illustrated Anton's stories. Anton wrote to him, advising him to stay sober and to pursue writing, but to no avail. He died in Luka (in Lintvarev's country estate) at the age of 31 of tuberculosis. Nikolai's death influenced Anton's A Boring Story, about a man faced with his own impending death.

== Gallery ==
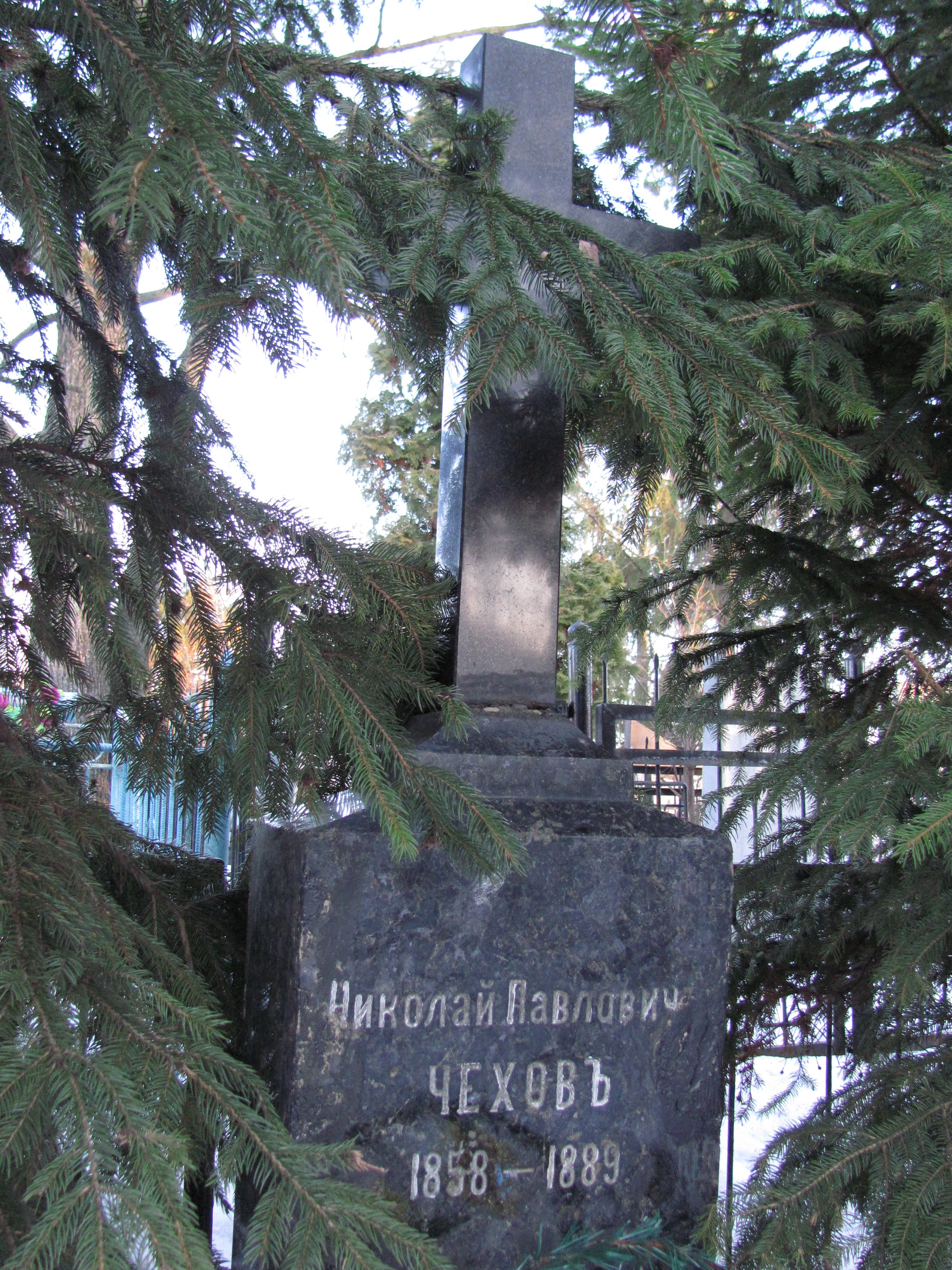
Nikolai Chekhov's grave

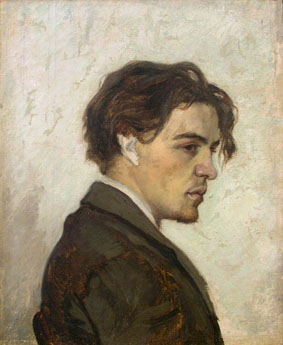
Portrait of Anton Chekhov

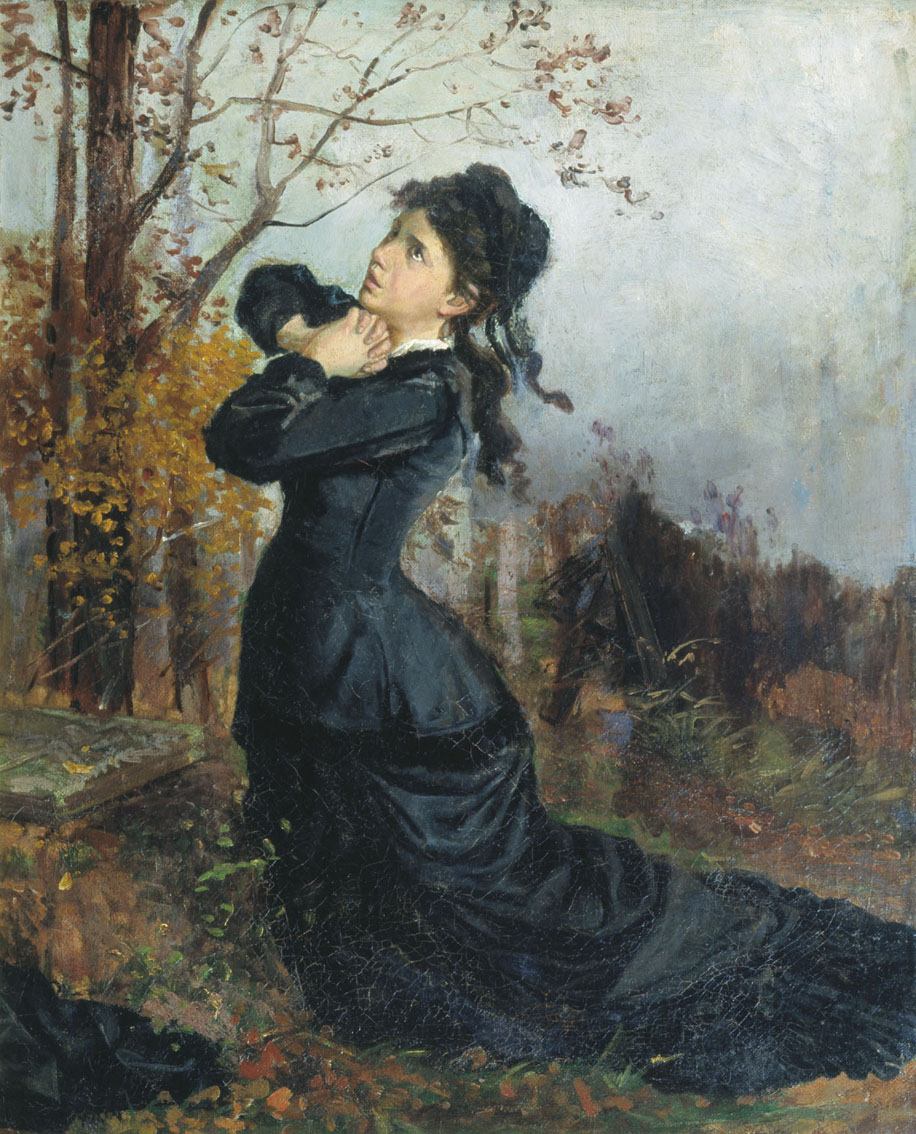
The Young Widow at the Grave of Her Husband

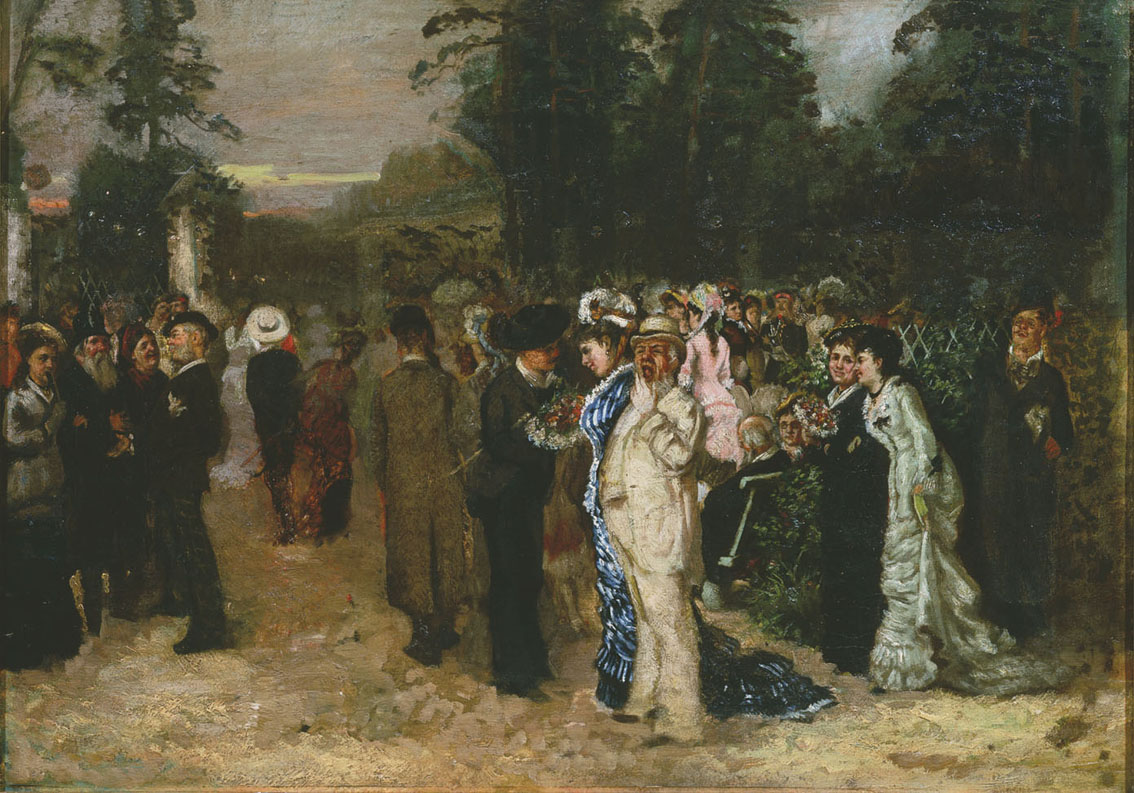
The Party at Sokolniki
