= Stepan Andreyevskiy =

Andrey Saviichevich Glebov
- Russian: Степан Степанович Андреевский
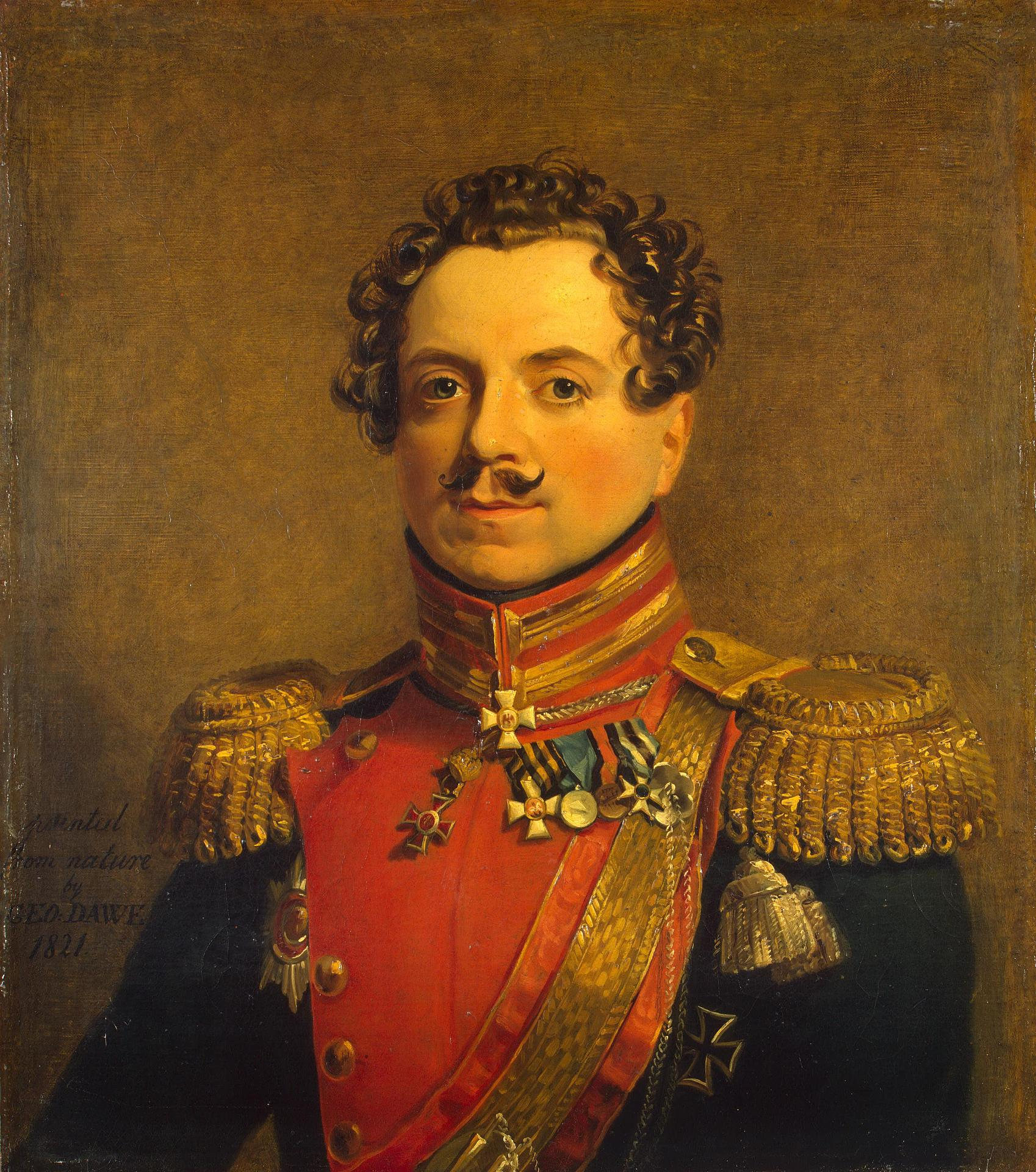
- Portrait of Andreyevskiy by George Dawe (Military Gallery, Hermitage)
- Born: 9 July 1782; Tver Governorate, Russian Empire
- Died: 19 October 1843 (aged 61)
- Burial place: Zhadanovo, Simbirsk Governorate
- Military career
- Allegiance: Russian Empire
- Branch: Imperial Russian Army
- Service years: 12 July 1799 – 12 September 1814 (1st spell); 11 March 1819 – 14 July 1828 (2nd spell)
- Rank: Major-General
- Awards: Prussian Iron Cross; Gold Sword for Bravery; Order of St. Anna; Order of St. George; Order of Leopold (Austria); Order of the Red Eagle; Military Order of Max Joseph

Stepan Stepanovitch Andreyevskiy (Russian : Степан Степанович Андреевский; 09 July [O.S. 28 June] 1782, Tver Governorate – 1 November [O.S. 19 October] 1843) was an Imperial Russian Army commander of the Napoleonic Wars, having the rank of Major General.

== Life ==
Born on 9 July 1782 into a noble family, Stepan Andreyevskiy entered the army on 12 July 1799 as an officer cadet in the guards cavalry namely the Life Guard Horse Regiment. In March 1801, promoted to cornet, he fought at Austerlitz. On 9 December 1809 he was promoted to colonel. He distinguished himself at the battle of Borodino and the battle of Krasnoi. During the German campaign of 1813 he fought at Bautzen, Dresden and Kulm. For his great bravery in these battles he was promoted to major general on 15 September 1813. He was also awarded several foreign orders for his bravery at the battle of Leipzig and the battle of Fère-Champenoise. In 1814, after the battle of Paris, he was awarded a golden sword inscribed "For acts of bravery".

He retired from the army on 23 September 1814 but returned on 11 March 1819, attached to the Lancer Guards before seven months later being put in command of the 2nd Brigade of the 1st Uhlan Division of Her Imperial Majesty Empress Fiodorovna. On 30 April 1821 he was put in command of the Lancer Guards then on 15 January 1827 of the 2nd Brigade of the Guards Light Cavalry Division. Major General Andreyevskiy retired on 14 July 1828.

== Sources ==
- Mikaberidze, Alexander (2005). Russian Officer Corps of the Revolutionary and Napoleonic Wars. Casemate Publishers. p. 7. ISBN 978-1611210026.
