= B.C. BookWorld =

B.C. BookWorld is a British Columbia-based quarterly newspaper about the book trade. It was established in 1987.

Founded by Alan Twigg in 1987, B.C. BookWorld is Canada's largest-circulation, independent publication about books.

== Mission ==
B.C. BookWorld aims to take the reviewing process out of the book publication trade, as its founder feels that most book reviews are too highbrow for the average reader's tastes. Founder Alan Twigg writes about B.C. Bookworld:

With BookWorld we have tried, from the outset, to institutionalize an educational newspaper that favours lively, up-to-date news rather than opinions. To do so, we have essentially taken a high-brow subject - books - and married it with a low-brow format - the tab newspaper. The end result is a middle-brow product that everyone can enjoy and use. It's pretty simple. And yet when I look at most other publications about books, it still seems to be unique.

Why cater to ten per cent of the population, the literary aristocracy, when you can reach the 80% of the population who like to read books? The general public is understandably turned off by the traditional book reviewing process, for good reasons. Your average book review consists of one literary aristocrat trying to tell other literary aristocrats how to think. Too often the reviewer is so busy trying to impress the reader with his or her intelligence and writing skill that he or she neglects to pass along basic information about what the hell the book is about.

At least half of the book reviews I see are corrupt. That is, all too often reviewers, who are usually underpaid or not paid at all, will 'pay themselves' by taking the freedom to abuse the public platform. Some will co-opt the space as an advertisement for themselves. Others will irresponsibly slag their enemies or support their friends. When reviewers are underpaid, it's very hard for an editor to ask for a re-write. The public by and large senses these recurrent failings and shuns the process.

== Staff ==
B.C. BookWorld publishes with a permanent staff of only two employees:

- David Lester, a musician with the music duo Mecca Normal
- Alan Twigg, who is also an author on subjects that include history, politics, soccer and the Dalai Lama.

The publication has been supported and overseen by Pacific BookWorld News Society since 1988.

== Publication details ==
B.C. BookWorld publishes in March, June, September and November.

== Related activities ==
In addition to the quarterly publication, B.C. BookWorld are involved in several book-related activities in the British Columbia area.

=== Awards ===
B.C. BookWorld sponsors the annual B.C. Book Prizes competition, co-founded by B.C. BookWorld's publisher in 1985. The staff currently coordinates the annual "George Ryga Award for Social Awareness" and also oversees management of, and provides financial sponsorship for, the $3000 "George Woodcock Lifetime Achievement Award" for B.C. authors.

=== Conferences ===
B.C. BookWorld sponsored "Reckoning '07", a conference on the past and future of West Coast writing and publishing in Canada. In 1984 B.C. BookWorld coordinated a gathering of Canadian authors to celebrate the career George Woodcock.

=== Websites ===
B.C. Bookworld maintain two separate websites: a reference service that provides information on books and authors related to British Columbia; and a basic information site related to the publication itself.
