= Foreshadowing =

Narrative device implying future events

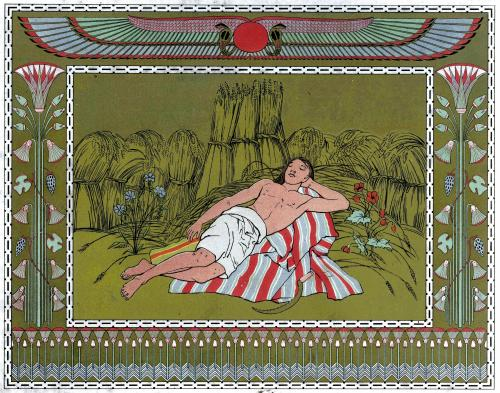
In the Book of Genesis, Joseph dreams of his brothers' grain bundles bowing to his own.

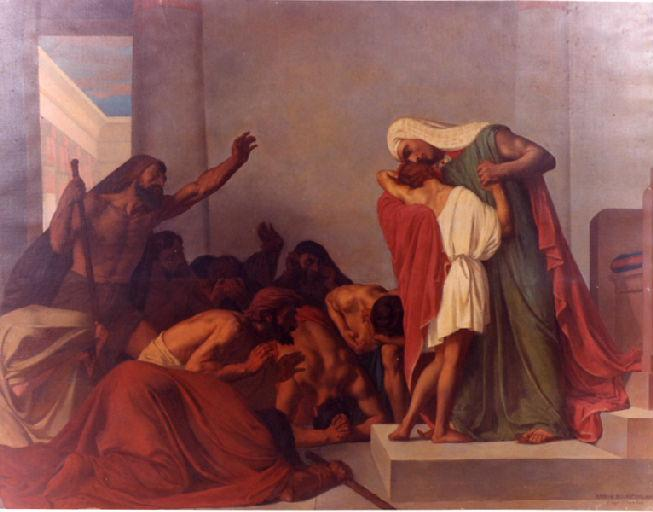
Later on, when Joseph becomes vizier of Egypt, his brothers bow to him as hinted by the dream.

Foreshadowing is a narrative device in which suggestions or warnings about events to come are dropped or planted. Foreshadowing often appears at the beginning of a story, and it helps develop or subvert the audience's expectations about upcoming events.

A writer may implement foreshadowing in many different ways such as character dialogues, plot events, and changes in setting. Even the title of a work or a chapter can act as a clue that suggests what is going to happen. Foreshadowing in fiction creates an atmosphere of suspense in a story so that the readers are interested and want to know more.

The literary device is generally used to build anticipation in the minds of readers about what might happen next to add dramatic tension to a story. Moreover, foreshadowing can make extraordinary and bizarre events appear credible, and some events are predicted so that the audience feels that it anticipated them.

Hints may be about future events, character revelations, and plot twists to create mood, convey theme, and build suspense, usually to hint at the good events that will likely cross paths with or happen to the main character later on.

Plot can be delayed by situations or events to give the impression that something momentous will occur to build anticipation and emphasize importance to them, which gives the audience a series of questions, particularly after cliffhangers.

The literary device is frequently adapted for use by composers of theatrical music, in the composition of operas, musicals, radio, films, television, gaming, podcasts, and internet scores and underscores, and incidental music for spoken theatrical productions.

== Methods ==
Foreshadowing can be accomplished by the use of story-driven or fictional events which can bring original dialogue, emotional investment in the plot, such as for the main character, unknown and present characters.

A flashback is the interruption of a sequential narrative plot to present important events that have happened in the past to present plot points that are difficult to bring into the narrative, such as character traits, events, or themes which may drive the current narrative or to be revealed.

== Related concepts ==
Foreshadowing is often confused with other literary devices:

- A red herring is a hint designed to mislead the audience. Foreshadowing only hints at a possible outcome within the confinement of a narrative and leads readers in the right direction.
- A flashforward is a scene that takes the narrative forward in time from the current point of the story in literature, film, television, or other media. Foreshadowing is sometimes employed through characters' explicitly predicting the future. Flashforwards have scenes shown out of chronological order in a nonlinear narrative, with chronology in an anachronist order, such as to make the reader or the audience think about the climax or reveals.
- Chekhov's gun holds that any element introduced in a story—such as a gun on the wall—should later prove necessary or else be removed, emphasizing tight, economical storytelling.
- Sideshadowing, described by literary critic Gary Morson, is the practice of including scenes that turn out to have no relevance to the plot, which intends to increase the verisimilitude of the fiction because the audience knows that in real life, unlike in novels, most events are in fact inconsequential. The "sense of structurelessness" invites the audience to "interpret and question the events that actually do come to pass."
