= Michelle Herman =

American writer

- Born: March 9, 1955 (age 71); Brooklyn, New York
- Education: B.S. (Chemistry & English); M.F.A. (Fiction)
- Alma mater: Brooklyn College; Iowa Writers' Workshop
- Occupation: Professor of English
- Employer: Ohio State University
- Known for: Writing
- Notable work: Dog and Missing
- Spouse: Glen Holland
- Children: daughter

Michelle Herman (born March 9, 1955, in Brooklyn, New York) is an American writer and Professor Emerita of English at Ohio State University. Her most widely known work is the novel Dog, which WorldCat shows in 545 libraries and has been translated into multiple languages. She has also written the novel Missing, which was awarded the Harold Ribalow Prize for Jewish fiction, and Close-Up, which won the Donald L. Jordan Prize for Literary Excellence. Her most recent book is the memoir-in-essays If You Say So. She is married to the painter Glen Holland. They have a daughter.

== Biography ==
Herman received a B.A./B.S. from Brooklyn College and an M.F.A. from the Iowa Writers' Workshop, after which she was a James Michener Fellow. She taught from 1988 until 2022 at the Ohio State University, where she was a founder of both the M.F.A. Program in Creative Writing and an interdisciplinary graduate program in the arts.

She has received a National Endowment for the Arts Fellowship and many grants from the Ohio Arts Council and Greater Columbus Arts Council in addition to her James Michener Fellowship.

In addition to her novels, she has published a collection of short fiction, A New and Glorious Life. "Auslander," which appears in the collection was also included in American Jewish Fiction: A Century of Stories by Gerald Shapiro and other anthologies.

She has also published three earlier essay collections, The Middle of Everything, Stories We Tell Ourselves, and Like A Song. She writes a weekly advice columnist for Slate.

Roberta Maierhofer viewed Herman's novel Missing as a literary gerontology example of the process of redefining one's self in advancing age.

== Bibliography ==
- Herman, Michelle. If You Say So. Aiken, SC: Galileo Press, 2025. ISBN 978-0913123508
- Herman, Michelle. Close-Up. Columbus: DLJ Press/Columbus State University Press, 2022. ISBN 978-0578905280
- Herman, Michelle. Devotion. San Francisco: Outpost19, 2016. ISBN 978-1944853112
- Herman, Michelle. Like A Song. San Francisco: Outpost19, 2015. ISBN 978-1073557783
- Herman, Michelle. The Middle of Everything: Memoirs of Motherhood. Lincoln: University of Nebraska Press, 2005. ISBN 9780803224261
- Herman, Michelle. Dog: A Short Novel. San Francisco: MacAdam/Cage Pub, 2005. ISBN 9781596921115
  - Translated by Fenisia Giannini into Italian as La mia vita con Phil ISBN 9788884908698
- Herman, Michelle. Missing. Columbus: Ohio State University Press, 1990. ISBN 9780814205037
- Herman, Michelle. A New and Glorious Life: Novellas. Pittsburgh: Carnegie Mellon University Press, 1998. ISBN 9780887482847 (contains: "A New and Glorious Life", "Auslander", and "Hope Among Men")
- Herman, Michelle. Stories We Tell Ourselves (contains "Dream Life" and "Seeing Things") Univ. of Ohio Press, 2013. ISBN 978-1-60938-153-0
- Herman, Michelle. Weekly advice column, https://slate.com/author/michelle-herman Slate.
