= Yakov Kolokolnikov-Voronin =

Russian painter

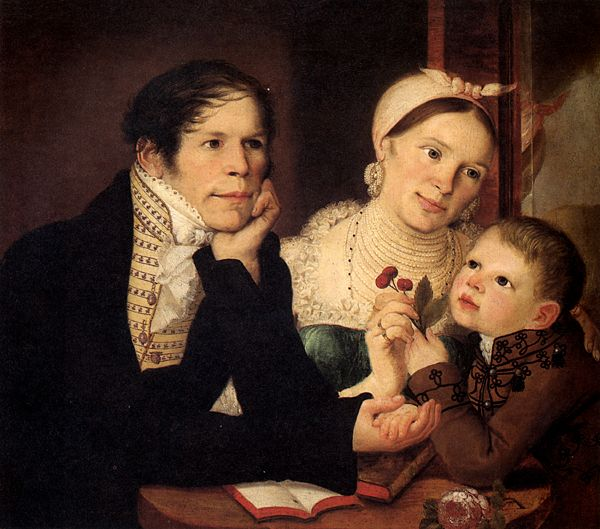
Self-portrait with his wife Stepanida Semyonovna and son Alexander; 1820s

Yakov Mikhaylovich Kolokolnikov-Voronin (Russian: Яков Михайлович Колокольников-Воронин; 1782–1845) was a Russian painter who worked as a portraitist and icon-painter in the town of Ostashkov, Tver Governorate.

Yakov was born in Ostashkov into a family of artists. His father Mikhail Lukich Kolokolnikov-Voronin (1710 - after 1788) was a portraitist working in Ostashkov, and his uncles Mina and Fedot were artists working in Saint-Petersburg.

Yakov at the time was documented as a Merchant of the 3rd Guild, a small retailer. In 1838, after presentation of his works to the Imperial Academy of Arts he received a certificate stating him to be a free (vneklassny) artist. In 1841 he officially removed himself from the guild of merchants and painting became his only occupation.

Yakov painted portraits, genre paintings, miniatures, and icons. Since he did not have a formal education he is usually classified as a primitivist. He was the maker of the silver Tsar Doors for the Transfiguration Cathedral in the Nilo-Stolbenskaya Pustyn Monastery. In 1805 he became the founder of the Ostashkov Theater.

Yakov had three sons: Alexander (1818–1870), Ivan (1828–1865) and Mikhail (1830–1867). All of them became painters and were connected with the Ostashkov Theater.
