= Harold L. Klawans =

American neurologist and writer (1937–1998)

Harold L. Klawans (1937–1998) was an academic neurologist who launched a parallel career as a writer.

== Life ==
Klawans was born in Chicago and graduated from South Shore High School. He then graduated from the University of Michigan and received a Doctor of Medicine degree from the University of Illinois College of Medicine in 1962. He became a neurologist and professor of neurology and pharmacology at Rush Medical College. He published in the fields of extrapyramidal disorders, neuropharmacology, and medical history and served as editor of The Journal of Clinical Pharmacology and of the encyclopedic Handbook of Clinical Neurology while publishing several novels.

His study Chekhov's Lie, written just three years before his 1998 death, addresses the challenges of combining medical practice with writing.

== Bibliography ==
Selected works by Klawans include:

=== Nonfiction ===
- Toscanini's Fumble and Other Tales of Clinical Neurology (1988) ISBN 0-553-34662-8
- Newton's Madness: Further Tales of Clinical Neurology (1990) ISBN 0-370-31420-4
- Trials of an Expert Witness: Tales of Clinical Neurology and the Law (1991) ISBN 1-888799-19-6
- Life, Death, and In Between : Tales of Clinical Neurology (1992) ISBN 1-56924-871-0
- Chekhov's Lie (1997) ISBN 1-888799-12-9
- Why Michael Couldn't Hit and Other Tales of the Neurology of Sports (1998) ISBN 0-7167-3001-4
- Defending the Cavewoman and Other Tales of Evolutionary Neurology (2000) ISBN 0-393-04831-4

=== Fiction ===
- Sins of Commission (1982) ISBN 0-7472-0090-4
- The Third Temple (1983)
- Informed Consent (1986)
- The Jerusalem Code (1988)
- And Mother Makes Thirteen (1999) ISBN 1-888799-20-X
