= Erik von Loewis =

German actor and director

- Born: 22 February 1904; Dorpat, Livonia, Russian Empire
- Died: 5 November 1986 (aged 82); West Berlin, West Germany
- Occupation: Actor
- Years active: 1937-1981 (film & TV)

Erik von Loewis (1904–1986) was a German stage actor and director. He also acted in film and television. Born in Estonia, he was of Baltic German heritage.

== Partial filmography ==
- Fridericus (1937) - Stabsoffizier
- Don't Promise Me Anything (1937) - (uncredited)
- The Yellow Flag (1937) - Schiffssteward
- The Model Husband (1937) - Linienerichter (uncredited)
- The Indian Tomb (1938) - Reporter
- The Man Who Couldn't Say No (1938) - Guilio, Elsas Bruder
- By a Silken Thread (1938) - Begleiter Eickhoffs bei der Hochzeitstafel
- Pour le Mérite (1938)
- Grube Morgenrot (1948)
- Und wieder 48 (1948) - Adjutant des Königs
- The Berliner (1948) - Franzose (uncredited)
- Don't Dream, Annette (1949) - Monsieur Picard
- Quartet of Five (1949) - Oberarzt
- The Beaver Coat (1949) - Wilhelm Böllsche
- The Blue Swords (1949) - Leutnant von Kittwitz
- Und wenn's nur einer wär' (1949) - Vorsitzender im Gericht
- Bürgermeister Anna (1950) - Lehrer Schmidt
- The Witch (1954)
- Sergeant Borck (1955) - Kriminalhauptkommissar Dr. Kopp
- The Barrings (1955) - Hofrat Herbst
- The Story of Anastasia (1956) - Baron von Walepp
- Spy for Germany (1956) - Schäfer
- Der Adler vom Velsatal (1957)
- The Fox of Paris (1957) - Gen. Eisner
- Rosemary (1958) - von Killenschiff
- Restless Night (1958)
- Stalingrad: Dogs, Do You Want to Live Forever? (1959)
- Lockvogel der Nacht (1959) - (uncredited)
- Die schöne Lügnerin (1959) - General Seidelbast (uncredited)
- Adorable Arabella (1959)
- The Last Witness (1960) - Mitglied von Rameils Gesellschaft (uncredited)
- Eine hübscher als die andere (1961)
- The Squeaker (1963) - Juwelier
- DM-Killer (1965) - Mr. von Bredow
- Die fromme Helene (1965) - Bürgermeister Hartlaub
- Playgirl (1966)
- Long Legs, Long Fingers (1966) - Anwalt
- Dear Mother, I'm All Right (1972)

== Bibliography ==
- Giesen, Rolf. Nazi Propaganda Films: A History and Filmography. McFarland, 2003.
