= Peter Carsten =

German actor

- Carsten in Dark of the Sun
- Born: 30 April 1928; Weißenburg in Bayern, Germany
- Died: 20 April 2012 (aged 83); Lucija, Slovenia
- Occupations: Actor; film producer
- Years active: 1953–1999

Peter Carsten (30 April 1928 – 20 April 2012) was a German actor and film producer. He appeared in 90 films between 1953 and 1999, including in supporting roles, Dark of the Sun (1968), Hannibal Brooks (1969), Madame Bovary (1969), And God Said to Cain (1970) and Zeppelin (1971).

== Selected filmography ==
- The Immortal Vagabond (1953)
- The Beginning Was Sin (1954) - Marko, Knecht
- 08/15 (1954) - Stabsgefreiter Kowalski
- The Song of Kaprun (1955) - Bertl
- 08/15 – Part 2 (1955) - Stabsgefreiter Kowalski
- The Happy Village (1955) - Gerd Bunje, Müller
- 08/15 at Home (1955) - Stabsgefreiter Kowalski
- Weil du arm bist, mußt du früher sterben (1956) - Erich Klein
- Fruit in the Neighbour's Garden (1956) - Briefträger
- Nina (1956) - Major Tubaljow
- Like Once Lili Marleen (1956) - Toni Knoll
- Love (1956) - Jan Hopper
- The Story of Anastasia (1956) - Soldat Tschaikowski
- Sand, Love and Salt (1957) - Alberto
- Song of Naples (1957) - Ercole Ercurio
- Scherben bringen Glück (1957) - Toni
- The Devil Strikes at Night (1957) - Mollwitz
- The Wide Blue Road (1957) - Riva, 2nd Coast Guard Officer
- Scampolo (1958) - Cesare
- U 47 – Kapitänleutnant Prien (1958)
- Peter Voss, Thief of Millions (1958) - Willy
- Stalingrad: Dogs, Do You Want to Live Forever? (1959) - Gefreiter Krämer
- Freddy, the Guitar and the Sea (1959) - Jan
- Heiße Ware (1959) - Otto Faber
- Heimat, deine Lieder (1959) - Lastwagenfahrer Klemke
- As the Sea Rages (1959) - Panagos
- Triplets on Board (1959) - Fred Larsen
- Freddy and the Melody of the Night (1960) - Karl Bachmann
- Under Ten Flags (1960) - Lt. Mohr
- Crime Tango (1960) - Boxer-Franz
- Headquarters State Secret (1960) - Otto Panzke
- Mal drunter – mal drüber (1960) - Benno Biller
- When the Heath Is in Bloom (1960) - Klaus
- Officer Factory (1960) - Hauptmann Katers
- Girl from Hong Kong (1961) - Volkert
- It Can't Always Be Caviar (1961) - Bastian
- This Time It Must Be Caviar (1961) - Bastian
- The Secret of the Black Trunk (1962) - Ponko, ein Bettler
- The Legion's Last Patrol (1962) - Barbarossa
- Barras heute (1963) - Obertgefreiter Blättchen
- Wochentags immer (1963) - Kaiser
- Storm Over Ceylon (1963) - Hermann
- Time of the Innocent (1964, producer)
- The Art of Living (1965, producer)
- 13 Days to Die (1965) - Hans Warren
- A Study in Terror (1965) - Max Steiner
- Tender Scoundrel (1966) - Otto Hanz
- The Quiller Memorandum (1966) - Hengel
- My Name Is Pecos (Due once di piombo) (1966) - Steve
- All'ombra delle aquile (1966)
- Da Berlino l'apocalisse (1967) - Günther
- The Vengeance of Fu Manchu (1967) - Kurt
- Heubodengeflüster (1967) - Florian Maderer
- Massacre in the Black Forest (1967)
- Dark of the Sun (1968) - Capt. Henlein
- Hannibal Brooks (1969) - Kurt
- Madame Bovary (1969) - Rudolf Boulanger
- 11 Uhr 20 (1970, TV miniseries) - Korska
- And God Said to Cain (1970) - Acombar
- Mafia Connection (1970) - Orlando Lo Presti
- When You're With Me (1970) - Joe Falk
- Mr. Superinvisible (1970) - Pomeranz
- Zeppelin (1971) - Major Tauntler
- Web of the Spider (1971) - Dr. Carmus
- Where the Bullets Fly (1972)
- Hell River (1974) - Col. Henke
- Milano: il clan dei calabresi (1974) - Maraschi
- Devojacki most (1976) - Major Kolbe
- Vrhovi Zelengore (1976) - Oberst
- Das Gesetz des Clans (1977) - Harald Sommer
- Hajka (1977) - Zandar
- Stici pre svitanja (1978) - Major Kramer
- Moment (1978) - The German from Vrsac
- The Rip-Off (1978) - Van Stratten
- Trener (1978) - Knez
- Devil's Island (1979) - commander of German ship
- Partizanska eskadrila (1979) - General general
- Rad na odredjeno vreme (1980) - Stranger in the hotel
- Variola Vera (1982) - Epidemiologist from the UN
- Twilight Time (1982) - Factory Gateman
- Wallenberg: A Hero's Story (1985, TV film) - Von Fremd
- Donator (1989) - Maj. Siegfried Handke
- Ein Schloß am Wörthersee (1990–1993, TV series) - Casino Director
- The Serbian Girl (1991)
- Kad mrtvi zapjevaju (1998) - Kurt Müller
