= Robert Mellin =

American songwriter (1902–1994)

- Born: Israel Melnikoff; September 22, 1902; Kiev, Russian Empire
- Died: July 10, 1994 (aged 91)
- Occupations: Composer, lyricist and music publisher

Israel Melnikoff (September 22, 1902 – July 10, 1994), known professionally as Robert Mellin, was a Russian-born American composer, lyricist, and music publisher. Born in Kiev (now Ukraine), he was raised in Chicago, where he began his career as a music plugger at Remick Music. In the early 1940s, he moved to New York, where he established his own company in 1947.

In the early 1950s, Mellin moved to Europe, where he wrote music or lyrics for hundreds of songs, including several hits, over the next two decades. His biggest hit was My One and Only Love written with lyricist Guy Wood. It was recorded by many artists, including Frank Sinatra, Louis Armstrong, Ella Fitzgerald, Chet Baker and (as a duet) John Coltrane and Johnny Hartman. In 1962, Mellin wrote lyrics for Acker Bilk's instrumental Stranger on the Shore, enabling it to be covered by vocal artists.

From the mid-1950s onwards, he ran his own music publishing company, Robert Mellin Music, based in London's Tin Pan Alley on Denmark Street. Tony Hatch found his first job there. The company acquired exclusive rights to all film scores coming out of Czechoslovakia and Rumania, as well as many scores from Italy. With Gian Piero Reverberi, Mellin wrote the theme music for the 1964 TV series The Adventures of Robinson Crusoe, which became a hit single, and, in 1966, the score for Don Quijote. He also wrote music for films in the 1960s.

Mellin married the songwriter Patricia Rossiter in 1980. He died while on a business trip to Rome at age 91.

== Songs ==
- Eddie Fisher: "I'm Yours" (1952) – music and lyrics by Mellin
- Frank Sinatra: "My One and Only Love" (1953) – music by Guy Wood, lyrics by Mellin
- Ames Brothers: "You, You, You" (1953) – music by Lotar Olias, lyrics by Mellin
- Nat King Cole: "My One Sin" (1955) – music by Vittorio Mascheroni, lyrics by Mellin
- Frank Sinatra: "Rain (Falling from the Sky)" (1955) – music and lyrics by Mellin and Gunther Finlay
- "Stranger on the Shore" (1962) – lyrics by Mellin (original composition by Acker Bilk was an instrumental)
- Julie Rogers, Lydia MacDonald: "You Never Told Me" (1966) – music by Piero Piccioni, lyrics by Mellin
