= Homesick for St. Pauli =

1963 film

- Directed by: Werner Jacobs
- Written by: Gustav Kampendonk; Lotar Olias
- Produced by: Wolf C. Hartwig; Ludwig Spitaler
- Starring: Freddy Quinn; Jayne Mansfield; Ullrich Haupt
- Cinematography: Heinz Pehlke
- Edited by: Klaus Dudenhöfer
- Music by: Lotar Olias
- Production company: Rapid Film
- Distributed by: Constantin Film
- Release date: 29 August 1963
- Running time: 102 minutes
- Country: West Germany
- Language: German

Homesick for St. Pauli (German: Heimweh nach St. Pauli) is a 1963 German drama film directed by Werner Jacobs and starring Freddy Quinn, Josef Albrecht and Ullrich Haupt. It was based on a musical by Lotar Olias and Gustav Kampendonk

The film was one of the many foreign films that Jayne Mansfield made in the 1960s, after becoming a star in the late 1950s in films like: The Girl Can't Help It (1956) and Will Success Spoil Rock Hunter? (1957).

The film's sets were designed by the art directors Albrecht Becker and Herbert Kirchhoff. Location shooting took place in New York and Germany. The film was shot in Hamburg in mid-1963.

== Synopsis ==
A German singer who has enjoyed massive success in the United States returns to his hometown, the St. Pauli district of Hamburg.

== Cast ==
- Freddy Quinn as Jimmy Jones
- Josef Albrecht as Theo Steinemann
- Ullrich Haupt as Bob Hartau
- Erna Sellmer as Mutter Steinemann
- Beppo Brem as Seppl
- Bill Ramsey as Jack
- Jayne Mansfield as Evelyne
- Christa Schindler as Rosie Becker
- Hein Riess as Kuddel
- Heiner Holl as Manager Harry
- Charles Palent as Rotkäppchen
- Addi Münster as Wirt
