= My Children and I =

1955 film

- Directed by: Wolfgang Schleif
- Written by: Heinz Pauck; Heinz Oskar Wuttig
- Produced by: Hermann Schwerin
- Starring: Grethe Weiser; Doris Kirchner; Claus Biederstaedt
- Cinematography: Erich Claunigk
- Edited by: Hermann Ludwig
- Music by: Georg Haentzschel
- Production company: Fono Film
- Distributed by: Europa-Filmverleih
- Release date: 25 October 1955
- Running time: 96 minutes
- Country: West Germany
- Language: German

My Children and I (German: Meine Kinder und ich) is a 1955 West German comedy drama film directed by Wolfgang Schleif and starring Grethe Weiser, Doris Kirchner and Claus Biederstaedt. It was shot at the Templehof Studios in West Berlin. The film's sets were designed by the art directors Mathias Matthies and Ellen Schmidt.

== Synopsis ==
When she is unexpectedly widowed, Mutz Hartmann needs to support her children and takes up a job as a taxi driver. Meanwhile, her two eldest children try to make their way in the world.

== Cast ==
- Grethe Weiser as Mutz Hartmann
- Doris Kirchner as Gabriele 'Gaby' Roecker
- Claus Biederstaedt as Günther Hartmann
- Hans Nielsen as Wilhelm Roecker
- Paul Dahlke as Otto Baumann
- Barbara Rost as Monika Hartmann
- Roland Kaiser as Peter Hartmann
- Karin Volquartz as Gisela
- Alexander Engel as Herr Knirsch
- Emil Suhrmann as Dr. Sibelius
- Wolf Martini as Herr Strelow
- Erna Sellmer as Frieda
- Blandine Ebinger as Untermieterin
- Willi Rose as Taxifahrer
- Fritz Wagner as Erpresser
- Boy Gobert as Charlie Scheller - Manager

== Bibliography ==
- Bliersbach, Gerhard. So grün war die Heide: der deutsche Nachkriegsfilm in neuer Sicht. Beltz, 1985.
- Bock, Hans-Michael & Bergfelder, Tim. The Concise CineGraph. Encyclopedia of German Cinema. Berghahn Books, 2009.
