= Heroism after Hours =

1955 German film

- Directed by: Wolfgang Becker; Erik Ode; Wolfgang Schleif; Fritz Stapenhorst
- Written by: Joachim Fernau; Hanns H. Fischer
- Produced by: Alfred Bittins; Willy Laschinsky
- Cinematography: Otto Baecker; Wolfgang Müller-Sehn; Oskar Schnirch
- Edited by: Hermann Ludwig; Ilse Wilken
- Music by: Hans-Martin Majewski; Herbert Windt
- Production companies: Arca-Filmproduktion; Omega Film
- Distributed by: Neue Filmverleih
- Release date: 18 May 1955
- Running time: 90 minutes
- Country: West Germany
- Language: German

Heroism after Hours (German: Heldentum nach Ladenschluß) is a 1955 West German anthology comedy film directed by Wolfgang Becker, Erik Ode, Wolfgang Schleif and Fritz Stapenhorst and featuring an ensemble cast. It is in four parts, each portraying a different tale of German soldiers attempting to get home at the end of the Second World War. It was shot at the Wandsbek Studios in Hamburg and on location around West Berlin, Bavaria and the Rhineland. The film's sets were designed by the art directors Wilhelm Vorwerg and Hans Berthel. The production company made a documentary the same year that also celebrated the ordinary German soldier.

== Cast ==
- Josef Sieber as Richard Siewert (segment "Die schwaebische Eisenbahn")
- Horst Uhse as Willi (segment "Die schwaebische Eisenbahn")
- Herbert Weissbach as Der Sachse (segment "Die schwaebische Eisenbahn")
- Johannes Buzalski as Der Berliner (segment "Die schwaebische Eisenbahn")
- Charles Regnier as Zauberer Maro (segment "Der Zauberer Maro")
- Franz-Otto Krüger as Fink (segment "Der Zauberer Maro")
- Willi Rose as Gluckert (segment "Der Zauberer Maro")
- Serge Beloussow as (segment "Der Zauberer Maro")
- Oliver Hassencamp as Anton Hirsemenzel (segment "Romeo und Julia auf dem Tandem")
- Gerd Vespermann as Julius Dingelmann (segment "Romeo und Julia auf dem Tandem")
- Claudia Gerstäcker as Juliette (segment "Romeo und Julia auf dem Tandem")
- Harald Juhnke as Burmann (segment "Captain Fox")
- Rolf Weih as Richard (segment "Captain Fox")
- Wolfgang Wahl as Karl (segment "Captain Fox")
- Jo Herbst as (segment "Captain Fox")
- Klaus Herm as Paul Bauer (segment "Captain Fox")
- Werner Finck as Herr an der Litfasssaeule
- Hans Friedrich as Der Feine (segment "Die schwaebische Eisenbahn")
- Edward Tierney as Captain Fox (segment "Captain Fox")

== Bibliography ==
- Giesen, Rolf. Nazi Propaganda Films: A History and Filmography. McFarland, 2003.
- Noack, Frank. Veit Harlan: The Life and Work of a Nazi Filmmaker. University Press of Kentucky, 2016.
