= Wolfgang Schleif =

German film director (1912–1984)

- Born: Wolfgang Schleif; 14 May 1912; Leipzig, German Empire
- Died: 21 August 1984 (aged 72); West Berlin, West Germany
- Occupations: Film director, screenwriter, film editor
- Years active: 1935–1984

Wolfgang Schleif (14 May 1912 – 21 August 1984) was a German film director, screenwriter and film editor.

== Life and career ==
Wolfgang Schleif studied philosophy, psychology and pedagogy at the University of Leipzig. In 1934 he passed the State Examination for teachers at the Volksschule. But then he took classes at the Acting School of the Deutsches Theater in Berlin, where he was trained in directing.

Schleif began working in film in 1935. By 1938, he was an assistant director. In 1939, he became a screenwriter and eventually an editor. Among his assignments, he was one of the editors of the propaganda films Jud Süß (1940) and Kolberg (1945). In 1947, Schleif was joined the DEFA film studio, making his directorial debut in 1948 with the anti-capitalist production Grube Morgenrot. This was followed by the 1949 film biography of Johann Friedrich Böttger, The Blue Swords.

After 17 June 1953, Schleif emigrated to West Germany. With The Immenhof Girls 1955 he managed an extraordinary success, which laid down his work but also for years on the production of such substances. He made several hit movies starring Freddy Quinn, but also war films such as Rommel Calls Cairo and crime films such as Der rote Rausch and, in the early seventies, back to the Immenhof films, Die Zwillinge von Immenhof (Twins from Immenhof) and Frühling im Immenhof (Spring in Immenhof).

Since the mid-sixties Schleif worked extensively for television. He often led directed series and mini-series, particularly 1967 five episode series Bürgerkrieg in Rußland. (Civil war in Russia).

He is buried in the Dahlem cemetery in Berlin.

== Selected filmography ==
- The Journey to Tilsit (director: Veit Harlan, 1939)
- The Buchholz Family (director: Carl Froelich, 1944)
- Marriage of Affection (director: Carl Froelich, 1944)
- The Morgenrot Mine (1948)
- The Blue Swords (1949)
- The Immenhof Girls (1955)
- My Children and I (1955)
- Heroism after Hours (1955)
- Seamen (1957)
- Made in Germany (1957)
- Eine Reise ins Glück (1958)
- Rommel Calls Cairo (1959, the German-language version of Foxhole in Cairo)
- Freddy, the Guitar and the Sea (1959)
- The Blue Moth (1959)
- Freddy and the Melody of the Night (1960)
- You Must Be Blonde on Capri (1961)
- Aurora Marriage Bureau (1962)
- The Red Frenzy (1962)
- Between Shanghai and St. Pauli (1962)
- A Holiday Like Never Before (1963)
- The Sky Is Blue (1964, TV film)
- Der Fall Harry Domela (1965, TV film) — (docudrama about Harry Domela)
- Der Forellenhof (1965–1966, TV series)
- Operation Yellow Viper (1966)
- Bürgerkrieg in Rußland (1967–1968, TV miniseries) — (docudrama about the Russian Civil War)
- Der Fall Wera Sassulitsch (1968, TV film) — (docudrama about Vera Zasulich)
- Sir Basil Zaharoff – Makler des Todes (1969, TV film) — (docudrama about Basil Zaharoff)
- Der irische Freiheitskampf (1969, TV film) — (docudrama about the Easter Rising)
- Hurra, unsere Eltern sind nicht da (1970)
- The Twins from Immenhof (1973)
- Spring in Immenhof (1974)
- Die Koblanks (1979, TV series)
