= Germany in the Eurovision Song Contest 1956 =

- Eurovision Song Contest 1956
- Participating broadcaster: ARD (Note: Arbeitsgemeinschaft der öffentlich-rechtlichen Rundfunkanstalten der Bundesrepublik Deutschland) – Nord- und Westdeutscher Rundfunkverband (NWRV)
- Country: Germany
- Selection process: Song: National final Artist: Unknown
- Selection date: 1 May 1956

Competing entries

First entry
- Song: "Das Lied vom großen Glück"
- Artist: Walter Andreas Schwarz
- Songwriter: Walter Andreas Schwarz

Second entry
- Song: "So geht das jede Nacht"
- Artist: Freddy Quinn
- Songwriters: Lotar Olias; Peter Moesser

Placement
- Final result: N/A

Participation chronology

Germany was represented at the Eurovision Song Contest 1956 with two songs: "Das Lied vom großen Glück", (Note: Later known as "Im Wartesaal zum großen Glück") written and performed by Walter Andreas Schwarz; and "So geht das jede Nacht", composed by Lotar Olias, with lyrics by Peter Moesser, and performed by Freddy Quinn. The German participating broadcaster on behalf of ARD, Nord- und Westdeutscher Rundfunkverband (NWRV), organised a national final to determine their two entries for the contest. "Das Lied vom großen Glück" was the first-ever entry from Germany performed in the Eurovision Song Contest.

== Background ==
The European Broadcasting Union (EBU) was formed in 1950 among 23 organisations with the aim of the exchange of television programmes. Following the formation of the EBU, a number of notable events were transmitted through its networks in various European countries, such as Belgium, France, and the United Kingdom. Following this series of transmissions, a "Programme Committee" was set up within the EBU to investigate new initiatives for cooperation between broadcasters. The new European contest was subsequently approved at the EBU's General Assembly in October 1955. A planning sub-group, was subsequently formed to build out the rules of the competition. The rules of the contest were finalised and distributed to EBU members in early 1956. Per the rules of the contest, each participating broadcaster submitted two songs into the contest. During a meeting held on 27 and 28 October 1955, the television program directors of the German broadcasting corporation ARD decided to participate in the contest and to organise a national final. Germany was subsequently included on the EBU's list of seven countries whose broadcasters had signed up to partake in the contest. For the 1956 contest, NWRV held a national final to choose two German entries.

== Before Eurovision ==
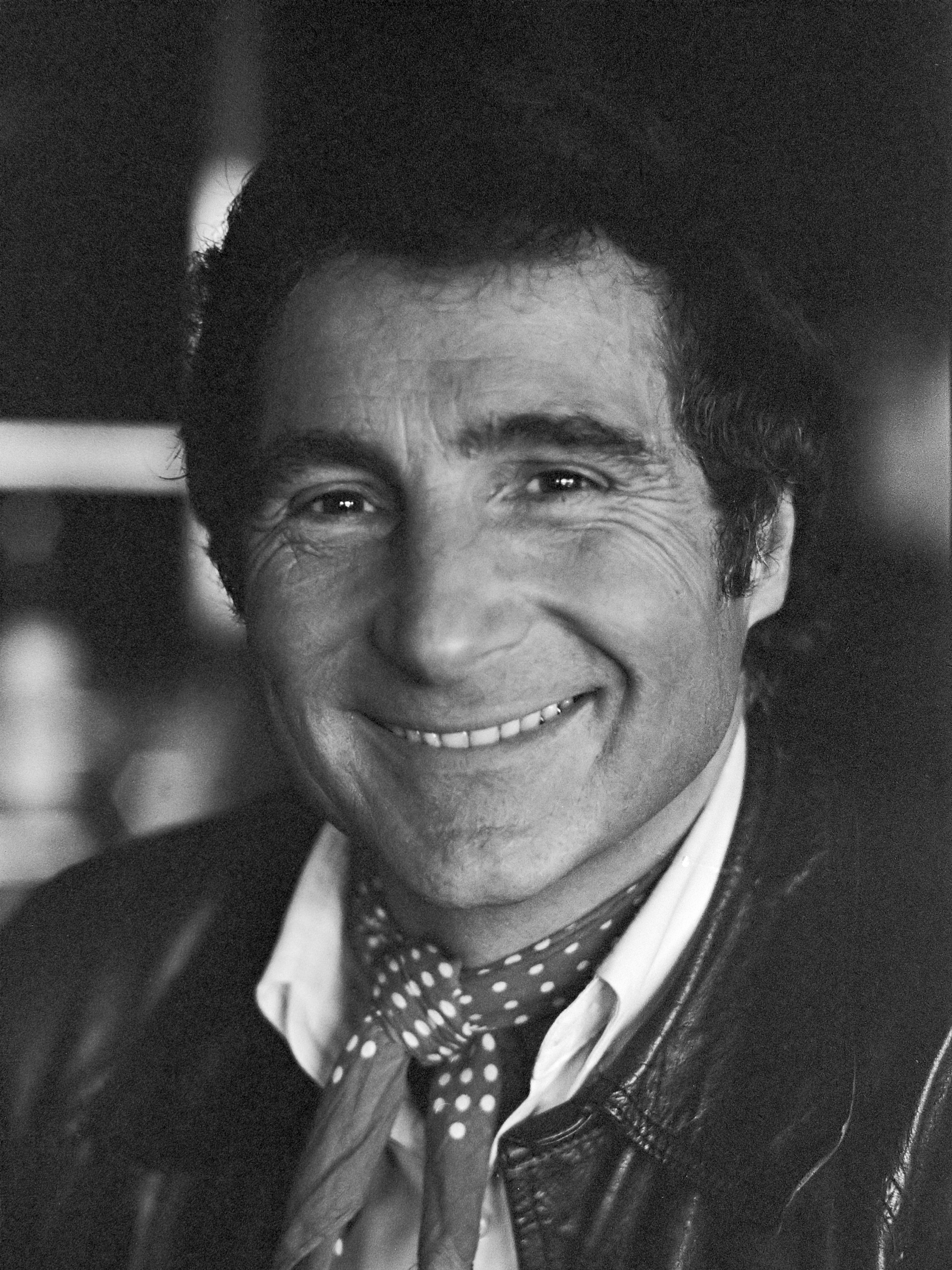
Freddy Quinn (pictured in 1977) was selected along with Walter Andreas Schwarz to represent Germany in 1956

=== Grand Prix 1956 Eurovision – Schlager und Chansons ===
"Grand Prix 1956 Eurovision" – Schlager und Chansons was the national final held to determine the two songs that should represent Germany. It took place on 1 May 1956 at 20:00 CET (19:00 UTC) at the Großer Sendesaal of Kölner Funkhaus in Cologne and was broadcast on Deutsches Fernsehen. Initially, the final was planned to be held in Hamburg. It was produced by Nord- und Westdeutscher Rundfunkverband (NWRV), a cooperation of NDR and WDR, and directed by John Olden. The presenter was Heinz Piper. 13 songs took part in the national final. The participants were chosen upon invitation from NWRV and other ARD broadcasters.

Initial plans foresaw that each ARD broadcaster submitted two songs and two artists for the national final until 1 February 1956.

In April 1956, several listings magazines finally announced a list of 11 performers who should sing the competing compositions: Lys Assia (nominated by SDR), Eva Busch (SWF), Angèle Durand, Margot Eskens (SFB), Friedel Hensch und die Cyprys (NWRV), Margot Hielscher (BR), Bibi Johns (SDR), Rolf Baro (Radio Bremen), Walter Andreas Schwarz (HR), Hans Arno Simon, and Gerhard Wendland (NWRV). Freddy Quinn was not part of the announced list. The periodical fff-press later reported that "a large number of the artists that had been announced weren't present." Press reports published after the national final confirmed the participation of Friedel Hensch und die Cyprys, Walter Andreas Schwarz, Melitta Berg (nominated by SWF, and not part of the initial list), as well as of Lys Assia. By the time the national final took place, Lys Assia had already been selected to represent Switzerland at Eurovision. In contrast, Margot Hielscher stated that, according to her documents, she was not in Cologne on 1 May 1956 but in Berlin for filming.

The artists were accompanied by the WDR Tanz- und Unterhaltungsorchester under the direction of Adalbert Luczkowski. The running order was to be drawn by lot with director John Olden being able to overrule the order in case of imbalances. The running order as well as the titles of the participating songs are not known for a few exceptions: "Im Wartesaal zum großen Glück" was presented under the title "Das Lied vom großen Glück" in the national final. A song titled "Ich bin so unmusikalisch" reportedly took part. Lys Assia performed her song 13th (and last) in the running order. There was a rumour that she sang the song "Ein kleiner gold'ner Ring" in the national final. However, this turned out to be incorrect, as she competed with this song in the German Schlager Festival of 1961.

Three French-speaking acts, among them Les Compagnons du zodiaque and Annie Cordy, singing in both German and French, were the interval acts.

A jury, which was watching the songs in a separate room on TV screens, decided the winning songs. The jury was composed by members of the general public with each ARD broadcaster sending one juror. It seems that the selection took place in two rounds, with a superfinal confronting a few songs chosen among the 13 entries from the first round.

The first two places were selected to represent Germany at the Eurovision Song Contest in Lugano: "Das Lied vom großen Glück", written by Walter Andreas Schwarz (first place), and "So geht das jede Nacht", written by Peter Moesser and Lotar Olias (second). The songwriters of the winning entries were only revealed after the results. A trophy, which consisted of a transparent box filled with orchids, was given to the first place. The full results of the national final are not known. The song sung by Melitta Berg was reported to have finished in third place.

National final – 1 May 1956 (Note: Incomplete list of the competing entries.)
Artist	Song	Songwriter(s)	Place
Walter Andreas Schwarz	"Das Lied vom großen Glück"	Walter Andreas Schwarz	1
Freddy Quinn	"So geht das jede Nacht"	Peter Moesser; Lotar Olias	2
Melitta Berg			3

There have been speculations about whether the national final actually took place: Despite the fact that the show appeared in listings magazines, none of the named participants could recall having taken part in the national final. However, reviews and articles about the national final were published in several German print media after the final, including Süddeutsche Zeitung, Quick and Bild+Funk, giving details about the jury and the winning songs.

Walter Andreas Schwarz, of Jewish origins, was a survivor of the concentration camps and had been working as an announcer for the BBC after World War II. Freddy Quinn was an Austrian national with an American father and sung his entry in rock'n'roll style. The first two German entrants, Walter Andreas Schwarz and Freddy Quinn, have therefore been interpreted as "cosmopolitan representatives of a West Germany that was distancing itself from its Nazi past and embracing an Americanized present."

== At Eurovision ==
Eurovision Song Contest 1956 took place at the Teatro Kursaal in Lugano, Switzerland, on 24 May 1956. "Im Wartesaal zum großen Glück" was, like in the national final, presented under the title "Das Lied vom großen Glück". It was performed fourth and "So geht das jede Nacht" was performed eleventh in the running order, both following Belgium and preceding France's two songs. Both of the German entries were conducted at the contest by Fernando Paggi.

Neither of the German songs won the contest, and the full results were not revealed and have not been retained by the EBU. In the German national final of 1982, co-presenter Rudolf Rohlinger claimed that "Im Wartesaal zum großen Glück" had come second. Though the full results have never been made public, the claim has been repeated several times since.

Eurovision Song Contest 1956 was televised in Germany on Deutsches Fernsehen with commentary provided by Irene Koss. It was also broadcast live on Radio Bremen 2. Excerpts from the final in Lugano were broadcast on radio SWF2 on 18 June 1956 at 23:00 CET, and on Radio München on 30 June 1956 at 20:15 CET.
