= Heinz Pehlke =

German cinematographer

Heinz Pehlke (October 8, 1922 – March 12, 2002) was a freelance German cinematographer in film and television. In 1943, he worked as an assistant on the Nazi propaganda film, Kolberg directed by Veit Harlan and in 1962, on the anti-Nazi television film, Jeder stirbt für sich allein, directed by Falk Harnack.

== Life and early career ==
Heinz Paul Helmut Pehlke was born in Berlin to Elisabeth (née Knaack) and Friedrich Wilhelm Pehlke, a merchant. He first became interested in photography at the age of 12. In 1939, Pehlke began attending a graphic arts school in Berlin. That same year, while on vacation at the Millstätter See, he happened to see a movie being shot, Kitty und die Weltkonferenz, directed by Helmut Käutner, and first became interested in filmmaking.

In late summer 1942, at the age of 19, he was accepted as a trainee at Döring Film Werke, which made promotional films, including for the Ministry of Public Enlightenment and Propaganda headed by Joseph Goebbels. While there, Pehlke worked as an assistant to Czech cinematographer Friedrich Jurda on a Nazi propaganda film, Einsatz ausländischer Arbeiter in Deutschland ("Foreign Worker Employment in Germany"), where they filmed at Auschwitz and Birkenau concentration camps for six weeks. The footage may be part of the 1943 Nazi film Wir leben in Deutschland ("We Live in Germany"), archived at the Bundesarchiv-Filmarchiv; however, the credits don't mention Pehlke's participation. In autumn 1943, after the company was hit during a bomb attack, Pehlke sought a similar position at Universum Film AG (UFA). He was accepted in late August 1944 and began working at UFA on September 1, 1944 for 50 Reichsmark a week, though he had apparently already been working there as a temporary employee for several months. Pehlke finished his formal training at UFA.

Because of the war, there was a shortage of manpower and Pehlke advanced quickly, soon becoming an assistant to several notable cinematographers, such as Bruno Mondi. He worked as an assistant on Veit Harlan's propaganda film Kolberg, and under heavy allied bombing, to cinematographer Igor Oberberg an Käutner's film, Unter den Brücken and to Heinz von Jaworsky on Wolfgang Liebeneiner's unfinished film, Das Leben geht weiter (1945). The Liebeneiner film contained a nighttime farewell scene at a darkened Berlin S-Bahnhof, complete with a background of "flak" searchlights in the sky and cascading Pathfinder flares, (Note: Christbäume ("Christmas trees") were what the Germans called the Pathfinders' cascading flares and illuminating incendiary bombs that marked targets at night for the bombers flying right behind them.) to be produced with special effects. As Pehlke later commented, "The absurdity of it all was to produce with special effects what we were going through non-stop in reality."

In early February 1945, despite an injury in his teens that prevented him from being called to military service, Pehlke was called to serve in the Volkssturm, where he used Italian-made arms and had no ammunition. After the war, he was held by the Soviet Union as a prisoner of war in Spandau Prison and was released shortly thereafter in 1945.

== Postwar career ==
Even before the end of the war, Pehlke returned to the industry, continuing as the country came under Allied occupation, with licensing and denazification requirements, rationing and other difficulties. Film was in short supply, studio space was virtually non-existent and other difficulties presented themselves. Pehlke later spoke of trying to shoot in the winter of 1946-1947, which was unusually cold. While shooting in Dannenberg on the Elbe river, the camera froze and stopped working and they had to use a propane gas stove to keep the camera functioning while they completed the scene. He worked as an assistant and as a cameraman on a number of films, but was never listed in the credits. By the early 1950s, his career was stagnating. His breakthrough came with Teenage Wolfpack in 1956 and before long, he was working as a cinematographer, first in film and then in the 1960s, in television, as well. He worked on several television films based on novels, including Hans Fallada's Every Man Dies Alone and Gabriel Schilling's Flight, by Gerhart Hauptmann.

On September 23, 1994, Pehlke was given an award by the city of Cologne and the German Society for Photography "for his many years of outstanding achievement in film and television."

== Filmography (selected) ==
Film

- Ich heiße Nicki (1952)
- Teenage Wolfpack (1956)
- The Zurich Engagement (1957)
- Love From Paris (1957)
- Italienreise – Liebe inbegriffen (1957)
- Der Schinderhannes (1958)
- Voyage to Italy, Complete with Love (1958)
- Freddy, the Guitar and the Sea (1959)
- The Death Ship (1959)
- Freddy and the Melody of the Night (1960)
- The Crimson Circle (1960)
- Carnival Confession (1960)
- Weit ist der Weg (1960)
- Black Gravel (1961)
- The Last Chapter (1961)
- The Lightship (1963)
- Homesick for St. Pauli (1963)
- Tales of a Young Scamp (1964)
- Freddy, Tiere, Sensationen (1964)
- The Swedish Girl (1965)
- When the Grapevines Bloom on the Danube (1965)
- Nessie, das verrückteste Monster (1984)
- Reise ohne Wiederkehr (1989)

Television

- Ich fand Julia Harrington (1960)
- Jeder stirbt für sich allein (1962)
- Das Vergnügen, anständig zu werden (1962)
- The Sky Is Blue (1964, TV film)
- Eine etwas sonderbare Dame (1967)
- Meine Schwiegersöhne und ich (1969), series
- Königin einer Nacht (1969)
- Der Zarewitsch (1972), operetta
- Der Graf von Luxemburg (1973), operetta
- Das Land des Lächelns (1974), operetta
- Rund um die Uhr (1979), series
- Drei Damen vom Grill (1980), series
- Das doppelte Pensum (1984), series

== Awards ==
- 1994 Deutscher Kamerapreis: Cinematographer Achievement Award (German: Ehrenkameramann)
