= Freddy, the Guitar and the Sea =

1959 film

- Directed by: Wolfgang Schleif
- Written by: Gustav Kampendonk; Aldo von Pinelli
- Produced by: Peter Schaeffers; Hans Otto Schroder; Aldo von Pinelli
- Starring: Freddy Quinn; Corny Collins; Sabine Sesselmann
- Cinematography: Heinz Pehlke
- Edited by: Hermann Ludwig
- Music by: Lotar Olias
- Production company: Melodie Film
- Distributed by: UFA
- Release date: 28 April 1959
- Running time: 92 minutes
- Country: West Germany
- Language: German

Freddy, the Guitar and the Sea (German: Freddy, die Gitarre und das Meer) is a 1959 West German musical film directed by Wolfgang Schleif and starring Freddy Quinn, Corny Collins and Sabine Sesselmann.

== Cast ==
- Freddy Quinn as Freddy Ullmann
- Corny Collins as Sussi
- Sabine Sesselmann as Katja
- Peter Carsten as Jan
- Christian Machalet as Stefan
- Walter Scherau as Fater Ossenkamp
- Vickie Henderson
- Camilla Spira as Mother Ossenkamp
- Harry Meyen as Lothar Brückner
- Arthur Schröder as Mr. Brückner - a watch collector
- Carl Voscherau as a captain
- Ralf Wolter as Fietje
- Wolfgang Gruner as an employee in the bar
- Jürgen Graf as Thomsen
- Axel Monjé as a bar owner
- Werner Stock
- Ferry Olsen
- Käte Alving
- Siegfried Dornbusch
- Heinz Lausch
- Heinz Lingen
- Bruno W. Pantel
- Cora Roberts
- Anneliese Würtz
