= Mischief in Wonderland =

1957 film

- Aufruhr im Schlaraffenland
- Directed by: Otto Meyer
- Written by: Inka Köhler-Rechnitz
- Produced by: Alfred Förster
- Starring: Alexander Engel; Werner Krüger; Sabine Sesselmann; Cordula Trantow; Alexa von Porembsky; Harry Wüstenhagen
- Cinematography: Gerhard Huttula
- Edited by: Annelies Kriegar
- Music by: Norbert Schultze
- Distributed by: Förster Film
- Release date: 15 September 1957
- Running time: 80 minutes
- Country: West Germany
- Language: German

Mischief in Wonderland (German: Aufruhr im Schlaraffenland) is a 1957 West German fantasy film directed by Otto Meyer, loosely based on the story Schlaraffenland by poet Hans Sachs and a satire on the German Wirtschaftswunder. The film was released in the United States by K. Gordon Murray. It is also known as Riot in Cockaigne and Scandal in Fairyland.

== Plot ==
The King of Irgendwo ("Somewhereland") is beset by worries. His country's food stocks are running low and his coffers are empty. The only way out, as proposed by his advisers Schnorr and Astropolex, is to marry off his young daughter to the rich Sultan of Persipanien. However, the plan never gains traction because the young princess angrily rejects the idea of getting married and the Sultan insists on a rich bride.

One night during a thunderstorm, a young woman arrives at the castle. The King lets her in and gives her the last milk ration. She turns out to be a fairy who now wants to thank him. He receives a magic button with which he can ask for any food he wants. Soon the inhabitants of the little kingdom are living in a wonderland. Wine and lemonade now gush from the village fountain, the fountain itself is made of marzipan and the fences are made of chocolate. To protect the splendor, a rice pudding mountain ridge is built around the kingdom.

But soon people, especially children, realize there are disadvantages. All the people are fat and the school is closed due to "laziness". They ask the princess for help, as she is the only person who has avoided eating too much. But the adults have gotten used to the new way of life, so unrest breaks out in the land of milk and honey ...

== Cast ==
- Alexander Engel as the King of Irgendwo
- Werner Krüger as the Scholar Astropolex
- Sabine Sesselmann as the Fairy
- Cordula Trantow as the Princess
- Alexa von Porembsky as the Chambermaid
- Harry Wüstenhagen as the Valet Schnorr
- Otto Czarski as the Physician
- Helmut Ziegner as the Sultan of Persipanien

== See also ==
- Cockaigne
