= Blind Justice (1961 film) =

1961 film

- Directed by: Harald Philipp
- Written by: Harald Philipp; Fred Ignor
- Produced by: Artur Brauner; Wolf Brauner
- Starring: Peter van Eyck; Marianne Koch; Eva Bartok
- Cinematography: Friedl Behn-Grund
- Edited by: Lieselotte Johl
- Music by: Bernhard Eichhorn
- Production company: CCC Film
- Distributed by: Bavaria Film
- Release date: 6 October 1961
- Running time: 100 minutes
- Country: West Germany
- Language: German

Blind Justice or Excluded to the Public (German: Unter Ausschluß der Öffentlichkeit) is a 1961 West German crime drama film directed by Harald Philipp and starring Peter van Eyck, Marianne Koch and Eva Bartok. It was shot at the Spandau Studios in Berlin. The film's sets were designed by the art directors Otto Erdmann and Hans Jürgen Kiebach.

== Synopsis ==
While prosecuting a wealthy businessmen accused of murdering his wife so he could marry his younger girlfriend, the state prosecutor is forced to examine the evidence more closely after claims the accused is innocent and his wife committed suicide.

== Cast ==
- Peter van Eyck as Staatsanwalt Dr. Robert Kessler
- Marianne Koch as Ingrid Hansen
- Eva Bartok as Laura Beaumont
- Claus Holm as Dr. Werner Rüttgen
- Wolfgang Reichmann as Alexander Lamas
- Werner Peters as François Lacroix
- Susanne Cramer as Helga Dahms
- Alfred Balthoff as Generalstaatsanwalt Wilhelm Hansen
- Leon Askin as Strafverteidiger Dr. Leupold
- Rudolf Fernau as Generaldirektor Delgasso
- Gudrun Schmidt as Micheline
- Ralf Wolter as Fotograf
- Heinz Weiss as Staatsanwalt
- Jochen Blume as Französischer Inspektor
- Kurd Pieritz as Müllerburg
- Albert Bessler as Empfangschef
- Herbert Wilk as Vorsitzender des Schwurgerichts
- Peter Schiff as Inspektor Martens
- Heinz Welzel as Dr. Biermann
- Barbara Saade as Frau am Strand
- Kunibert Gensichen as Portier
- Klaus Dahlen as Paul Kramke
- Hans Schwarz Jr. as Fremder
- Heinz Spitzner as Untersuchungsrichter

== Bibliography ==
- Hans-Michael Bock and Tim Bergfelder. The Concise Cinegraph: An Encyclopedia of German Cinema. Berghahn Books, 2009.
