= Karin Baal =

German actress (1940–2024)

- Born: 19 September 1940; Berlin, Germany
- Died: 26 November 2024 (aged 84); Berlin, Germany
- Occupation: Actress
- Years active: 1956–2011

Signature
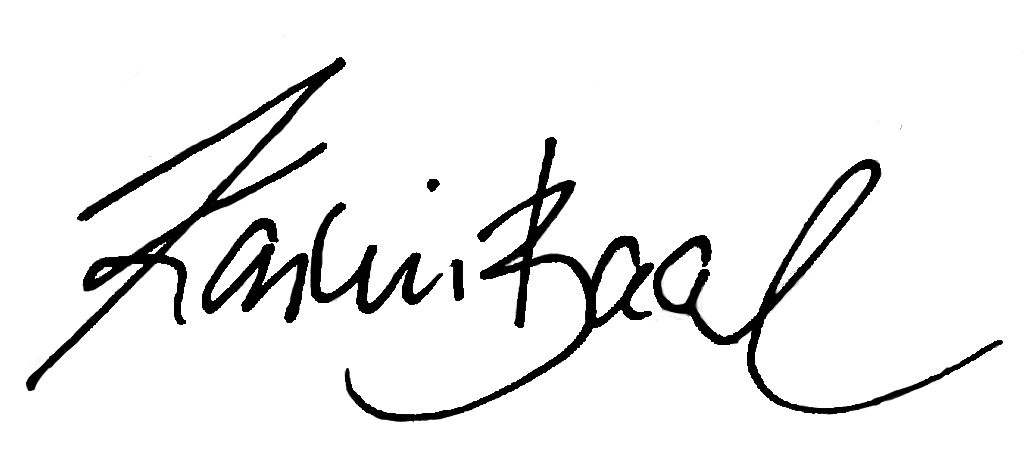

Karin Blauermel (19 September 1940 – 26 November 2024), known professionally as Karin Baal, was a German film actress. She appeared in more than 90 films since 1956. Baal died on 26 November 2024, at the age of 84.

== Filmography ==
=== Films ===
- 1956: Teenage Wolfpack
- 1957: Tired Theodore
- 1957: Jede Nacht in einem anderen Bett
- 1957: The Heart of St. Pauli
- 1958: Rosemary
- 1958: Iron Gustav
- 1959: That's No Way to Land a Man
- 1959: Bobby Dodd greift ein
- 1959: Jons und Erdme
- 1959: Arzt ohne Gewissen
- 1959: The Juvenile Judge
- 1960: We Cellar Children
- 1960: Juke Box – Urli d'amore
- 1960: The Young Sinner
- 1960: Und sowas nennt sich Leben
- 1961: The Dead Eyes of London
- 1961: Vertauschtes Leben
- 1961: You Must Be Blonde on Capri
- 1961: The Last Chapter
- 1962: Una domenica d'estate
- 1962: So toll wie anno dazumal
- 1962: Between Shanghai and St. Pauli
- 1962: Street of Temptation
- 1964: Mission to Venice
- 1966: Honour Among Thieves
- 1968: The Hound of Blackwood Castle
- 1969: Hannibal Brooks
- 1972: What Have You Done to Solange?
- 1977: Scrounged Meals
- 1981: Lili Marleen
- 1981: Angels of Iron
- 1981: Desperado City
- 1981: Lola
- 1982: Deadly Game
- 1982: The Man on the Wall
- 1984: Love Is Not an Argument
- 1984: Thousand Eyes
- 1986: Rosa Luxemburg
- 1988: The Passenger – Welcome to Germany
- 1991: The Terrible Threesome
- 1992: Cosimas Lexikon
- 2001: Sass
- 2004: Vinzent
- 2004: Das Kuckucksei
- 2007: Seven Days Sunday

=== Television ===
- 1959: Das letzte Aufgebot
- 1962: Film an Bord
- 1963: Karibisches Vergnügen
- 1963: Der Privatsekretär
- 1964: Spätsommer
- 1964: The Sky Is Blue
- 1965: Michael Kramer
- 1966: Der Mann aus Brooklyn
- 1966: Ein Mädchen von heute
- 1966: Herr Puntila und sein Knecht Matti
- 1966: Ghosts
- 1968: The Shooting Party
- 1969: Ein Jahr ohne Sonntag (TV series)
- 1971: Der Kommissar: Die Anhalterin
- 1972: Das System Fabrizzi
- 1973: Ein für allemal
- 1974: The Unguarded House
- 1976: Erika's Passions
- 1976: Derrick – Season 3, Episode 5: "Schock"
- 1977: Haus der Frauen
- 1979: Drei Freundinnen
- 1979: Desperado
- 1979: Wunder einer Nacht
- 1979: The Weavers
- 1979/80: Berlin Alexanderplatz
- 1980: Derrick – Season 7, Episode 8: "Auf einem Gutshof"
- 1980: Sternensommer (TV series)
- 1981: Derrick – Season 8, Episode 6 "Tod eines Italieners"
- 1984: Bluebeard
- 1984: The Last Civilian
- 1984: Tod eines Schaustellers
- 1984: Die Abschiebung
- 1984: Derrick – Season 11, Episode 8: "Ein Mörder zu wenig"
- 1985: Der Galaxenbauer
- 1986: Die Fräulein von damals
- 1986: Dann ist nichts mehr wie vorher
- 1989: Der letzte Gast
- 1990: Der neue Mann
- 1990: Marleneken
- 1993: Wenn Engel reisen (TV series)
- 1995: Zu treuen Händen
- 1995: 5 Stunden Angst – Geiselnahme im Kindergarten
- 1998: Alice auf der Flucht / Angst im Nacken
- 2001: Der Tunnel
- 2002: Betty – Schön wie der Tod
- 2003: Für immer verloren
- 2004: Fliege hat Angst
- 2005: Irren ist sexy
- 2006: Blackout – Die Erinnerung ist tödlich
- 2007: Hurenkinder
- 2009: Pfarrer Braun

== Autobiography ==
- Baal, Karin; Jeske, Cornelia (2012). Ungezähmt – mein Leben (in German). München: Südwest. ISBN 978-3-517-08722-1.
