= Friedrich Forster =

German dramatist and screenwriter

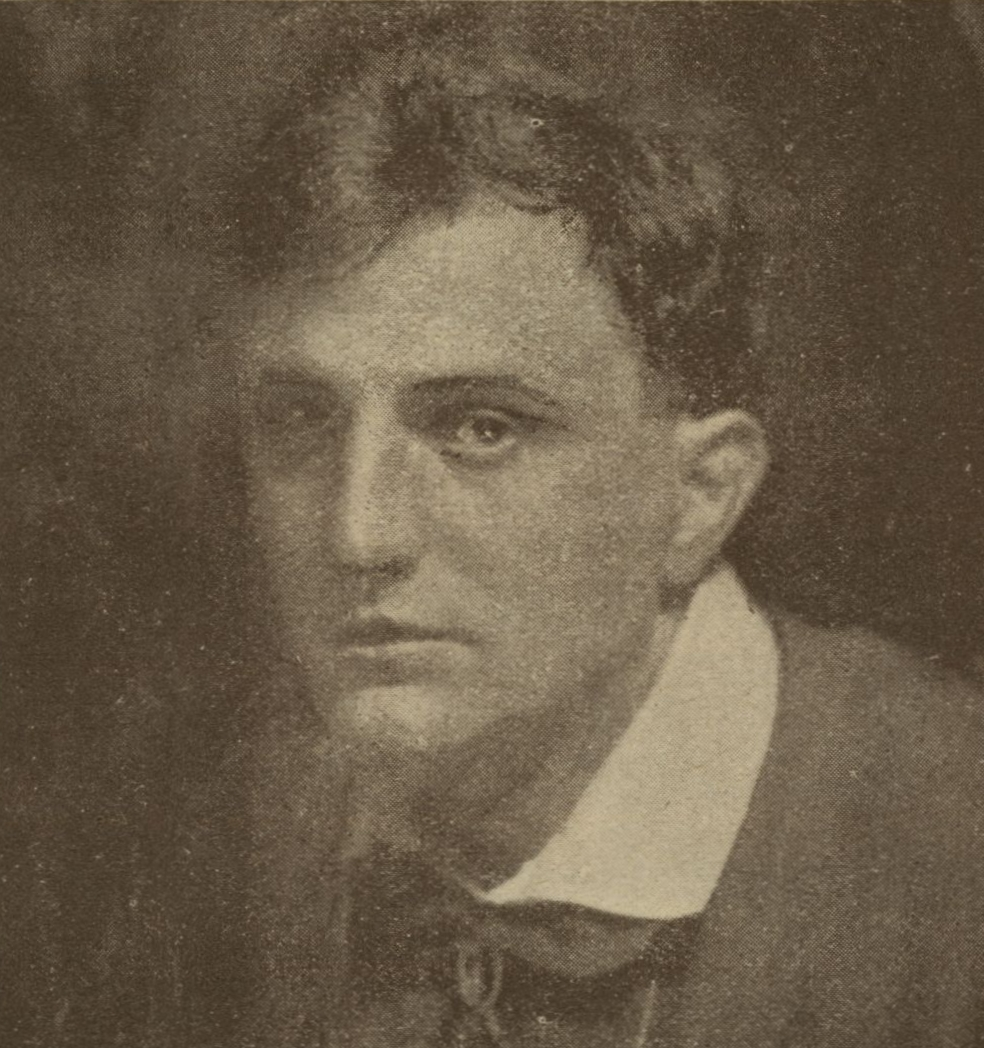
Photo from the 1920s

Waldfried Burggraf (11 August 1895 – 1 March 1958), known by his pseudonyms Friedrich Forster and Friedrich Forster-Burggraf, was a German dramatist, screenwriter, dramaturge and actor. His early plays explored controversial subjects, like anti-war sentiment, social reform, and same-sex bonding. When confronted with Nazi censorship, he adapted by authoring two plays perfectly attuned to the government's propaganda requirements. His best-known work is the play Robinson soll nicht sterben! (1932), one of several of his plays later adapted for motion pictures.

== Biography ==
Waldfried Burggraf was born in Bremen on 11 August 1895. His father was Julius Burggraf, a Protestant pastor and literary scholar. He attended the Schnepfenthal Salzmann School in Thuringia and the Altes Gymnasium in Bremen. Georg II, Duke of Saxe-Meiningen hired him as dramaturge and director at the Meiningen Court Theatre and then he served in the German military in the First World War.

His anti-war play Mammon premiered on 27 June 1919 at the Nuremberg City Theater.

Some of his early works addressed homoerotic themes. In 1920, the gay newsletterDer Eigene announced that its own publisher would soon make available Burggraf's 1918 play Die Nacht in Neapel. His expressionist monologue for Achilles, Flammen! Patroklus!, was staged at Berlin's Theater des Eros in 1921.

In his 1923 play Weh um Michael, a great success in Nurnberg in 1927, he presented the life of the 18th-century poet J.M.R. Lenz, explaining his suicide as an act of despair at not finding an audience for his critique of society. One literary critic summarizes Burggraf's treatment: "His Michael Lenz is a voice in the wilderness crying out against moral and social injustice."

In 1931 he changed his name to Friedrich Foster because he thought his birth name sounded itself like a pseudonym adopted to appear German. Under this pseudonym he enjoyed great success with Der Graue, one of the season's biggest hits, an exploration of the sympathetic relationship between teacher and student. In 1932 the play received the Literature Prize of the Deutsches Volkstheater in Vienna.

His play Robinson soll nicht sterben! (1932) imagined the final years of the English writer Daniel Defoe and the adventures of the children who recover the stolen manuscript of Robinson Crusoe and restore it to him. It was his greatest popular success. Forster's 1942 novella of the same name was adapted for a motion picture of the same name in 1957 and screened under the title The Girl and the Legend starring Romy Schneider. On 28 August 1942 Gerhart Hauptmann wrote to Forster: "I'm no softie, but I'm sure I've seldom cried so readily as in the last fourth of this work, for which I predict German immortality."

In 1933, however, he found that his success could not shield him from the censorship of the Nazi regime. His latest work Die Gesteinigten which treated the rebellion of the troops of Alexander the Great, was banned and all printed copies pulped. Some copies survived and the play provided the basis for Alexander, an opera by Theodor Holterdorf that premiered in Bremen in 1960.

Forster quickly repaired his relationship with the authorities. In the mid 1930s, many dramatists attempted to satisfy Nazi propagandists with plays about the Saxons' struggle under the leadership of Widukind to free themselves from Frankish domination in the eighth century. Foster's was one of the few produced. Its political message decrying the inability of the Saxons to unite against a common enemy aligned with the government's ideology. In October 1934, his drama Sieger had simultaneous premieres in Bielefeld, Bremen, Darmstadt, Konstanz, and Leipzig. It proved popular but received a mixed reception from critics and political commentators as they sorted out the complex figure of Charlemagne, oppressor of the Saxons but founder of the first German Reich. Some protested that a rousing patriotic final oration could not rescue a weak play, and the Frankfurter Zeitung called Foster a "political opportunist".

His drama Alle gegen Einen, Einer für Alle premiered on 21 February 1934 at the Theater des Volkes (Berlin). It was sponsored by Kraft durch Freude, a domestic propaganda agency of the Nazi government. The play's Swedish hero Gustav Wasa liberates his people from Danish oppression, a model for Nazi leadership and the German Volk.

In 1933 he became acting director of the Bayerisches Staatsschauspiel and artistic director of the Bayerische Landesbühne in Munich. When dismissed four years later, he settled in Schlehdorf in Bavaria and wrote screenplays for the motion picture production company Universum-Film Aktiengesellschaft, including several for children.

He later returned to Bremen where he died on 1 March 1958 at the age of 62.

== Works ==
Plays

- Opfer, 1918
- Mammon, 1918
- Madelaine und ihr Page Hyazint, 1919
- Flammen! Patroklus! Eine szenische Dichtung 1920
- Die Nacht in Neapel, 1918, text apparently lost
- Prinzessin Turandot, 1923 (after a piece by Carlo Gozzi)
- Weh um Michael, 1927
- Der Graue, 1931
- Robinson soll nicht sterben!, 1932
- Wendelin, 1932
- Die Gesteinigten, 1933, censored
- Alle gegen Einen, Einer für Alle, 1933
- Der Sieger, 1934
- Die Weiber von Redditz, 1934
- Die Verschwender, 1939
- Gastspiel in Kopenhagen, 1940
- Ariela, 1941
- Die Liebende, 1945
- Candide, 1948
- Ariel und die Schwestern, 1949

Screenplays

- Dreiklang, 1938
- Prinzessin Sissy, 1939
- Hotel Sacher, 1939
- The Waitress Anna, 1941
- Bergkristall, 1954, for television, based on Adalbert Stifter's novella Bergkristall

Novellas

- Matrosen in Würzburg, 1932
- Robinson soll nicht sterben, 1954

Fairy tales

- Hampelmann und Hampelfrau, 1940
- Schneewittchen und die sieben Zwerge (1941)
- Die Dunkelgräfin, 1944
