= Ingrid van Bergen =

German actress (1931–2025)

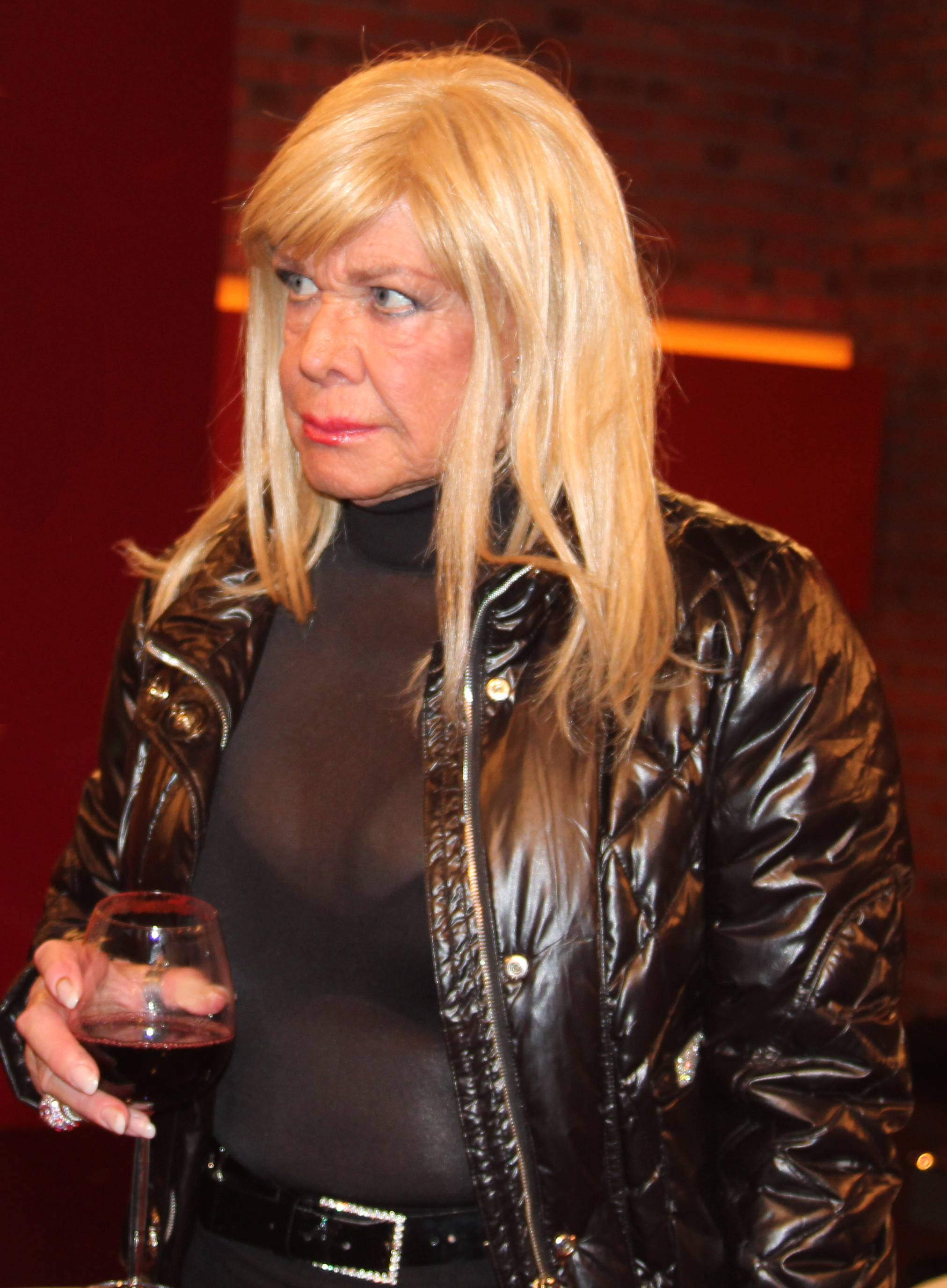
- Van Bergen in 2010
- Born: 15 June 1931; Danzig, Free City of Danzig (now Gdańsk, Poland)
- Died: 28 November 2025 (aged 94); Eyendorf, Lower Saxony, Germany
- Citizenship: German
- Occupation: Actress
- Years active: 1954–1977; 1983–2025
- Children: 2 (1 deceased)

Ingrid van Bergen (German: [ˈɪŋ.ɡʁiːt fan ˈbɛʁɡn̩]; 15 June 1931 – 28 November 2025) was a German film actress. She appeared in 100 films between 1954 and 2025.

== Career ==
From 1954 on, van Bergen appeared in more than 170 film and television productions. She was a star of German cinema in the 1950s and 1960s, including successful films like the comedy Roses for the Prosecutor (1959). During the early 1960s, the blond-haired actress also appeared as a supporting role in a few international productions, playing a prostitute in Town Without Pity (1961) with Kirk Douglas and appearing in the war film The Counterfeit Traitor (1962) starring William Holden. She also worked as a singer and made some records.

Van Bergen later turned to character roles and is also known for her role in the film Richy Guitar (1985), in which the German band Die Ärzte played an important role. In 2009, at the age of 77, she was the winner of Ich bin ein Star – Holt mich hier raus!, the German edition of I'm a Celebrity...Get Me Out of Here!. In 2017, van Bergen had her final film role with a cameo appearance in Sharknado 5: Global Swarming, the fifth film of the Sharknado film series.

== Personal life and death ==
On the night of 2–3 February 1977, she shot her lover, the money broker Klaus Knaths, killing him. She was charged with murder, but was convicted of manslaughter and sentenced to seven years' imprisonment. She was released after five years, because of good behaviour, and was able to continue her acting career.

Van Bergen died on 28 November 2025, at the age of 94 in her house in Eyendorf.

== Selected filmography ==
- Portrait of an Unknown Woman (1954)
- Des Teufels General (1955)
- Bandits of the Autobahn (1955)
- My Husband's Getting Married Today (1956)
- The Muzzle (1958)
- Wir Wunderkinder (1958)
- My Ninety Nine Brides (1958)
- Iron Gustav (1958)
- The Blue Moth (1959)
- Crime After School (1959)
- Roses for the Prosecutor (1959)
- Triplets on Board (1959)
- Boomerang (1960)
- Als geheilt entlassen (1960)
- The High Life (1960)
- We Cellar Children (1960)
- The Avenger (1960)
- Town Without Pity (1961)
- The Devil's Daffodil (1961)
- The Counterfeit Traitor (1962)
- Genosse Münchhausen (1962)
- Escape from East Berlin (1962)
- Tomfoolery in Zell am See (1963)
- Cat and Mouse (1967)
- The New Adventures of Snow White (1969)
- What Is the Matter with Willi? (1970)
- The Vampire Happening (1971)
- All People Will Be Brothers (1973)
- Vier gegen die Bank (1976, TV film)
- Horror Vacui (1984)
- Richy Guitar (1985)
- The Madonna Man (1987)
- Pakten (1995)
- Der schwarze Spiegel (2000, TV film)
- Angst (2003)
- Neues vom Wixxer (2007)
- Dinosaurier – Gegen uns seht ihr alt aus! (2009)
- Sharknado 5: Global Swarming (2017)

== Audio drama ==
- 2002: Evelyn Dörr: The Man in the Moon – A Radioballett with Charlie Chaplin. (Dt. Der Mann im Mond - Radio-ballett mit Charlie Chaplin. Piece for Acoustic Stage (in the role of Hedda Hopper) – Regie: Claudia Leist (Radio Drama / Feature – WDR)
