= We Cellar Children =

1960 film

- Directed by: Hans-Joachim Wiedermann
- Written by: Thomas Keck (dialogue); Herbert Kundler (dialogue); Wolfgang Neuss (screenplay)
- Produced by: Hans Oppenheimer (executive producer)
- Starring: See below
- Cinematography: Werner M. Lenz
- Edited by: Walter von Bonhorst
- Music by: Peter Sandloff
- Release date: 1960
- Running time: 86 minutes
- Country: West Germany
- Language: German

We Cellar Children (originally Wir Kellerkinder) is a 1960 West German film directed by Hans-Joachim Wiedermann.

== Cast ==
- Wolfgang Neuss as Macke Prinz
- Karin Baal as Nenne Briehl
- Ingrid van Bergen as Macke's sister Almuth Prinz
- Jo Herbst as Adalbert
- Wolfgang Gruner as Arthur
- Willi Rose as Father Prinz
- Hilde Sessak as Mother Prinz
- Ralf Wolter as Cinematographer Keschke from "Neue Deutsche Schau"
- Klaus Becker
- Dietmar Behnke
- Horst Dieter Braun
- Eckart Dux as Reporter Kemskorn from "Neue Deutsche Schau"
- Inge Egger as Mrs. Briehl
- Wilfried Fraß
- Joe Furtner
- Wolfgang Gerhus
- Friedrich Hartau
- Heinz Holl
- Thomas Keck
- Kurt Lauermann
- Bruno W. Pantel as Herms Niel
- Ethel Reschke
- Joachim Röcker
- Rudi Schmitt as Mr. Briehl
- Jochen Schröder
- Günther Schwerkolt
- Achim Strietzel as Knösel
- Rolf Ulrich as Glaubke
- Herbert Weissbach as Amtsgerichtsrat Bleiber
- Paul Westermeier as Portier
- Helmut Käutner as Chauffeur
- Erik Ode as Angry Father
- Erik Schumann as Ulrike's Friend
