= Triad (film) =

1938 film

- Directed by: Hans Hinrich
- Written by: Douglas Sirk; Friedrich Forster
- Produced by: Ernst Krüger; Hans Herbert Ulrich; Georg Witt
- Starring: Lil Dagover; Paul Hartmann; Rolf Moebius; Helga Marold
- Cinematography: Werner Krien
- Edited by: Paul May
- Music by: Kurt Schröder
- Production company: UFA
- Distributed by: UFA
- Release date: 24 May 1938
- Running time: 97 minutes
- Country: Germany
- Language: German

Triad (German: Dreiklang) is a 1938 German drama film directed by Hans Hinrich and starring Lil Dagover, Paul Hartmann and Rolf Moebius.

It was shot at the Babelsberg Studios with sets designed by the art directors Wilhelm Depenau and Ludwig Reiber.

== Cast ==
- Lil Dagover as Cornelia Contarini
- Paul Hartmann as Albert von Möller - Hauptmann a.D.
- Rolf Moebius as Ulrich von Möller - sein Sohn
- Helga Marold as Monika Schramm
- Walter Werner as Dr. Sitthard, Arzt
- Karl Günther as Henckelberg - Bankier
- Franz Weber as Anton - früherer Bursche von Möllers
- Lili Schoenborn-Anspach as Tina Zerbern - Cornelias Haushälterin
- Otto Matthies as Friedrich Wilhelm Meier - Hoflieferant
- Werner Pledath as Julius Schramm - Hausbesitzer
- Maria Seidler as Frau Schramm
- Emma Bergner
- Hildegard Fränzel
- Kunibert Gensichen
- Hans Heinz Müller
- Lotte Rausch
- Ernst G. Schiffner
- Eleonore Stadie
- Ewald Wenck
- Hans Alpassy
- Ludwig Kaldeberg
- Herbert Morris
- Ferdinand Robert
- Kai-Siegfried Seefeld

== Bibliography ==
- Hake, Sabine. Popular Cinema of the Third Reich. University of Texas Press, 2001.
