= Hermann Ludwig =

German film editor

- Occupation: Editor
- Years active: 1947-1964

Hermann Ludwig was a German film editor of the post-war era. He edited thirty German films and television series between 1947 and 1964.

== Selected filmography ==
- Marriage in the Shadows (1947)
- Thank You, I'm Fine (1948)
- The Morgenrot Mine (1948)
- The Blue Swords (1949)
- The Heath Is Green (1951)
- Don't Ask My Heart (1952)
- When the Heath Dreams at Night (1952)
- Captain Wronski (1954)
- Heroism after Hours (1955)
- The Immenhof Girls (1955)
- My Children and I (1955)
- Made in Germany (1957)
- The Blue Moth (1959)
- Freddy, the Guitar and the Sea (1959)
- Rommel Calls Cairo (1959)
- Freddy and the Melody of the Night (1960)
- The Forger of London (1961)
- The Lightship (1963)
- Encounter in Salzburg (1964)

== Bibliography ==
- Pitts, Michael R. Famous Movie Detectives III. Scarecrow Press, 2004.
