= The Sky Is Blue =

1964 West German television film

- Written by: Robert Gilbert; Per Schwenzen
- Directed by: Wolfgang Schleif
- Starring: Werner Stock; Karin Baal; Toni Sailer; Zarah Leander
- Music by: Friedrich Hollaender
- Country of origin: West Germany
- Original language: German

Production
- Producer: Artur Brauner
- Cinematography: Heinz Pehlke
- Editor: Walter von Bonhorst
- Running time: 97 minutes
- Production company: CCC Television

Original release
- Network: ZDF
- Release: 27 November 1964

The Sky Is Blue (German: Das Blaue vom Himmel) is a 1964 West German television musical film directed by Wolfgang Schleif and starring Werner Stock, Karin Baal, Toni Sailer and Zarah Leander. The film's sets were designed by the art director Willi Herrmann. It was shot at the Spandau Studios of CCC Film in West Berlin. It was first broadcast on ZDF on 27 November 1964. Leander had been a major star of German cinema during the Third Reich.

== Cast ==
- Werner Stock as Karl Doorn
- Gudrun Genest as Emma Doorn
- Karin Baal as Antje Doorn
- Toni Sailer as Richard Landa
- Zarah Leander as Désirée
- Beate Hasenau as Malvine Tulpe
- Carlos Werner as Philipp Outrelle
- Otto Matthies as Metz
- Bruno W. Pantel as Habermann
- Eva Maria Gebel as Lotte
- Michael Kotz as Franz
- Franz-Otto Krüger as Maurice
- Thomas Danneberg as Peter
- Anke Kröning as Emma
- Ursel Peter as Lilo
- Brit von Thiesenhausen as Frieda

== Bibliography ==
- Bock, Hans-Michael & Bergfelder, Tim. The Concise CineGraph. Encyclopedia of German Cinema. Berghahn Books, 2009.
- Bruns, Jana Francesca. Nazi Cinema's New Women: Marika Roekk, Zarah Leander, Kristina Soederbaum. Stanford University, 2002.
