= Roses for the Prosecutor =

1959 West German film

- Directed by: Wolfgang Staudte
- Written by: George Hurdalek; Wolfgang Staudte
- Produced by: Kurt Ulrich; Heinz Willeg
- Starring: Martin Held; Walter Giller; Ingrid van Bergen
- Cinematography: Erich Claunigk
- Edited by: Klaus Eckstein
- Music by: Raimund Rosenberger
- Production company: Kurt Ulrich Filmproduktion
- Distributed by: Neue Filmverleih
- Release date: 24 September 1959
- Running time: 97 minutes
- Country: West Germany
- Language: German

Roses for the Prosecutor (German: Rosen für den Staatsanwalt) is a 1959 West German comedy film with tragical and critical elements, directed by Wolfgang Staudte and starring Martin Held, Walter Giller and Ingrid van Bergen. It was one of the few German movies of the 1950s which openly addressed the German Nazi era.

It was shot at the Göttingen Studios in Göttingen near Hanover and above all, in Kassel. The film's sets were designed by the art director Walter Haag.

== Plot ==
In the final days of World War II, German soldier Rudi Kleinschmidt is arrested for the perceived theft of "air force chocolate" which, in reality, he bought through the black market. During his court-martial, judge Wilhelm Schramm accuses Kleinschmidt of Wehrkraftzersetzung and aiding the enemy, and sentences him to death. However, his execution is prevented by an Allied air raid and he narrowly escapes and manages to get hold of the execution warrant signed by Schramm.

Fifteen years later, Rudi is making a meagre living as a street peddler. When he goes to visit his friend, Lissy Flemming, Kleinschmidt once again encounters Schramm, now a successful prosecutor after keeping his Nazi past a secret and portraying himself as having resisted the regime. Schramm initially does not recognize Kleinschmidt, but nevertheless feels uneasy about him.

Eventually, Schramm remembers Kleinschmidt, and afraid of his past being exposed, attempts to scare Kleinschmidt out of town by having the local police harass him and even getting him temporarily arrested. This enables Schramm to secretly seize the old execution warrant from Rudi's property inventoried by the police.

Though Kleinschmidt is initially willing to leave, he suddenly changes his mind, hoping to reopen his case and to expose Schramm's past. He then smashes a shop window to steal two boxes of the very same chocolate, which leads to his arrest.

Schramm once more serves as the prosecutor in his case, but during the trial he defends Kleinschmidt instead, raising suspicion. Eventually, he absentmindedly demands that Kleinschmidt be sentenced to death, exposing his true self.

The trial is stopped and Schramm attempts to escape. Afterwards, Kleinschmidt intends to leave town, but ultimately decides to start a new life with Lissy.

== Production ==
Staudte did not believe the film could actually be made and stored the idea for it in his desk, where it was discovered by Manfred Barthel, who forwarded it to his boss, producer Kurt Ulrich. Ulrich found a company Europa-Verleih, who were willing to produce the film for DM 900,000. However, Staudte estimated that it would cost DM 1.3 million to make. Europa-Verleih, which had financed a number of socially critical, poorly received films before, and lost money in the process, was unwilling to invest that much. It took a further three months to find the eventual investor, Neue Filmverleih in Munich.

Staudte had to reduce his budget to DM 1 million and change the script from a drama to a comedy in order to be able to make the film. Despite this, he still had to moderate the film to allow it to appeal to the general West German public and not offend it.

== Cast ==
- Martin Held as senior prosecutor Wilhelm Schramm
- Walter Giller as Rudi Kleinschmidt
- Ingrid van Bergen as Lissy Flemming
- Camilla Spira as Hildegard Schramm
- Werner Peters as Otto Kugler
- Wolfgang Wahl as Defense Counsel
- Paul Hartmann as president of the country court Diefenbach
- Wolfgang Preiss as Attorney General
- Inge Meysel as Erna, housemaid at the Schramms
- Werner Finck as Haase
- Ralf Wolter as Hessel
- Roland Kaiser as Werner Schramm
- Henry Lorenzen as Graumann, waiter at Lissy's
- Wolfgang Neuss as Paul, a truck driver

== Reception ==
The Nazi area received very little coverage in the first decades of the post-war West German movie industry which was dominated by Heimatfilm and light entertainment. Roses for the Prosecutor was one of the rare instances in which the German justice system under the Nazis was openly discussed in West German film. Few directors dared to touch on the subject, but Wolfgang Staudte's Roses for the Prosecutor typified post-war Germany, where former Nazis rose to high ranking political and government positions without consequences for their previous actions.

The film was criticised for making Schramm too comical a figure for such an important subject, while Giller received praise for his convincing portrait of Kleinschmidt as a victim of wartime and postwar justice.

== Real life ==
In the movie, Schramm can be seen purchasing the far right Deutsche Soldaten-Zeitung, which subsequently used this fact for advertising in cinemas, using the slogan "Read the Deutsche Soldaten-Zeitung, like Dr. Schramm".

The antisemitic Zirngiebel who is allowed to escape with Schramm's help reflects the real-life case of Ludwig Zind, who had to escape Germany for a time after verbally abusing Jewish concentration camp survivor Kurt Lieser with an antisemitic tirade.

During filming, the case of judge Otto Wöhrmann in Celle came to light, which had many similarities to the fictional Schramm. During the war, Wöhrmann had sentenced two German soldiers to death for Wehrkraftzersetzung, but the court documents were destroyed in a bombing raid. Subsequently re-tried, the two received jail sentences instead. Wöhrmann's story came to light in 1959 and he went on leave while also requesting an investigation, which cleared him of perverting the course of justice and had him re-instated.
