= The Blue Moth =

1959 film

- Directed by: Wolfgang Schleif
- Written by: Erich Ebermayer; Carl von Barany; Siegfried Gauercke
- Produced by: Hans Raspotnik; Kurt Schulz
- Starring: Zarah Leander; Christian Wolff; Paul Hartmann; Werner Hinz
- Cinematography: Willy Winterstein
- Edited by: Hermann Ludwig
- Music by: Lotar Olias
- Production company: Berolina Film
- Distributed by: Union-Film
- Release date: 27 August 1959
- Running time: 90 minutes
- Country: West Germany
- Language: German

The Blue Moth (German: Der blaue Nachtfalter) is a 1959 West German drama film directed by Wolfgang Schleif and starring Zarah Leander, Christian Wolff and Paul Hartmann. Leander, who had been a major star during the Nazi era, made a comeback in the 1950s. By 1959, in her penultimate film, she was playing a more mature role than the traditional divas in her earlier films.

== Cast ==
- Zarah Leander as Julia Martens
- Christian Wolff as Thomas Martens
- Paul Hartmann as Lawyer Dr. Frahm
- Werner Hinz as Steve Owens
- Marina Petrova as Irina
- Loni Heuser as Elvira del Castros
- Lotte Brackebusch as Alte Frau Martens
- Hans Richter as Regisseur Olten
- Lore Schulz as Hausmädchen Elli
- Ingrid van Bergen as Revuegirl
- Karl Martell as Direktor
- Erwin Linder as Prosecutor
- Hans Paetsch as Richter
- Carl Voscherau as Pförtner Becker
- Walter Klam as Oberarzt
- Kurt A. Jung as Barkeeper Freddy

== Bibliography ==
- Anne Commire & Deborah Klezmer. Women in World History: A Biographical Encyclopedia, Volume 9. Yorkin Publications, 1999.
