= E. W. Fiedler =

German cinematographer

E.W. Fiedler
- Born: 10 June 1905; Berlin, German Empire
- Died: 7 April 1960 (aged 54)
- Other name: Ernst Wilhelm Fiedler
- Occupations: Cinematographer, Director
- Years active: 1932-1960 (film)

Ernst Wilhelm Fiedler (1905–1960) was a German cinematographer. He also directed three films.

== Selected filmography ==
- Gypsy Blood (1934)
- The Glass Ball (1937)
- The Marriage Swindler (1938)
- The Strange Woman (1939)
- Doctor Crippen (1942)
- A Gust of Wind (1942)
- The Golden Spider (1943)
- Ulli and Marei (1948)
- The Morgenrot Mine (1948)
- The Blue Swords (1949)
- Friday the Thirteenth (1949)
- The Last Year (1951)
- Elephant Fury (1953)
- Swelling Melodies (1955)

== Bibliography ==
- Giesen, Rolf. Nazi Propaganda Films: A History and Filmography. McFarland, 2003.
