= Information Received =

1961 British film by Robert Lynn

- Directed by: Robert Lynn
- Written by: Paul Ryder; Berkely Mather (story)
- Produced by: John Clein, George Maynard
- Starring: Sabine Sesselmann; William Sylvester
- Cinematography: Nicolas Roeg
- Edited by: Lee Doig
- Music by: Martin Slavin
- Production company: United Co-Productions
- Distributed by: J. Arthur Rank Film Distributors (UK)
- Release date: August 1961 (UK)
- Running time: 98 minutes
- Country: United Kingdom
- Language: English

Information Received is a 1961 British second feature ('B') crime film directed by Robert Lynn and starring Sabine Sesselmann, William Sylvester and Hermione Baddeley. The screenplay was by Paul Ryder from an original story by Berkeley Mather. The cinematography was by Nicolas Roeg.

A police detective goes undercover to infiltrate a safe-breaking outfit.

== Plot ==
Drake, the leader of a robbery gang, brings American safe-cracker Johnny Stevens over to Britain for a job. However Stevens is quickly arrested for an unrelated crime. The police arrange for freelance adventurer Rick Hogan to impersonate Stevens in prison, hoping to lure Drake's gang out of hiding. The gang spring "Stevens" who does the safe-cracking job for them, without revealing his true identity. Hogan then alerts the police.

== Cast ==
- Sabine Sesselmann as Sabina Farlow
- William Sylvester as Rick Hogan
- Hermione Baddeley as Maudie
- Edward Underdown as Drake
- Robert Raglan as Superintendent Jeffcote
- Frank Hawkins as Sargeant Jarvie
- Walter Brown as Vic Farlow
- David Courtney as Mark
- Peter Allenby as Patterson
- Bill Dancy as Johnny Stevens
- Dan Meaden as country policeman
- Ted Bushell as prison trustee
- Tim Brinton as TV announcer
- Johnny Briggs as Willis
- David Cargill as librarian
- Larry Taylor as Darnell
- Douglas Cameron as Warder Benham
- David Ensor as judge
- Tony Shepherd as squad car policeman

== Critical reception ==
The Monthly Film Bulletin wrote: "This second feature packs in far more crime clichés – including an undulating femme fatale played by Sabina Sesselman and a bit of Rififi safe-cracking – than it can handle in 77 minutes. But its confidently contrived thrills and dashing disregard for logic are disarming. William Sylvester plays the improbable hero with a nice blend of wry humour and conventional resourcefulness."

Kine Weekly wrote: "The picture has a few inconsistencies, but these are offset by its exciting pace. Sabina Sesselman is a tantalising and ruthless minx as Sabina, William Sylvester makes a cool Rick, and Hermione Badderly, Edward Underdown, Robert Raglan and Walter Brown are more than adequate as Maudie, Drake, Jeffcote and Farlow. Its romantic asides are gamy, humour cunningly eases the tension and there is a suspenseful and salutary finale, What's more, the settings are suitably varied and an effective musical score and efficient camerawork further heighten atmosphere."

TV Guide gave the film 2 out of 4 stars, writing: "the film is stylish and witty at times, but its pace just isn't as fast as it should be."
