= Hein Riess =

German actor and folk singer

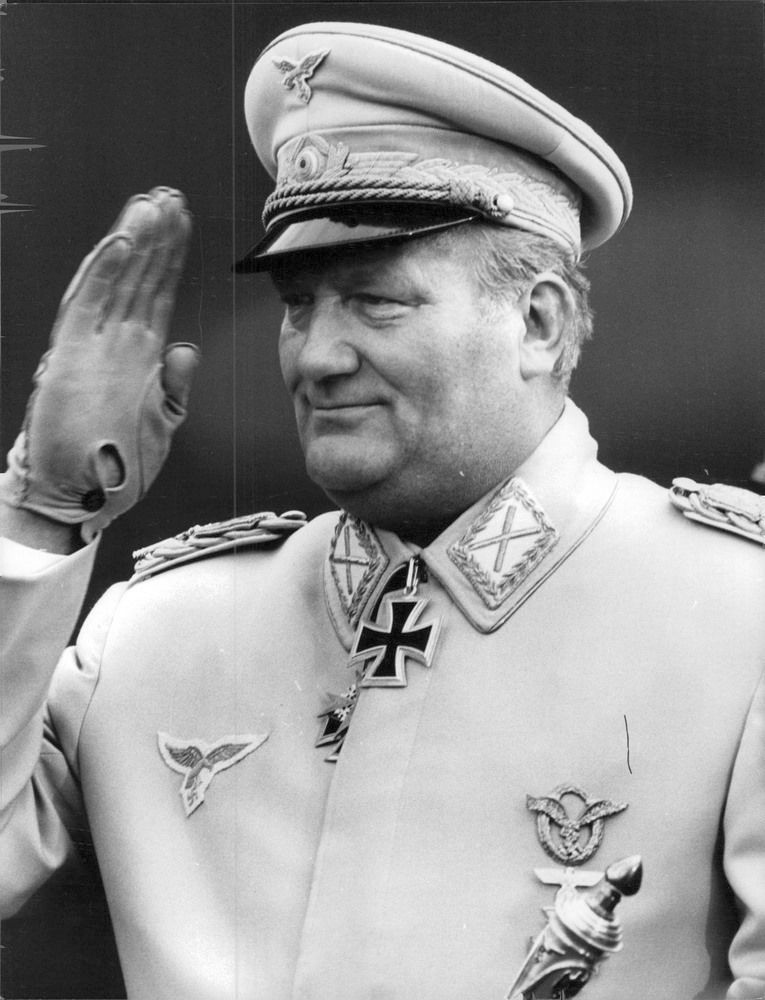
Hein Riess as Reichsmarschall Hermann Göring in the Battle of Britain (1969)

Hein Riess (11 September 1913 – September 1993) was a German actor and folk singer.

Riess was born in Hamburg-Eilbek. He was previously a sailor who began work as a cabin boy on ships and then became a professional singer, mainly of sea shanties. An LP of his recordings was released and a single on Polydor Records entitled The Story of the Pale Mary.

As an actor, he made appearances on several German television productions and in German films including the 1963 Werner Jacobs directed drama Homesick for St. Pauli (German: Heimweh nach St. Pauli), but he is best known internationally for his performance as Reichsmarschall Hermann Göring in the film Battle of Britain (1969). According to a booklet publicising the movie, he had allegedly once met Göring himself during the war. Former fighter ace Adolf Galland who worked as a technical consultant on the film had known Göring and was impressed with his performance and said his voice was exactly like Göring's.

Riess died of heart failure at age 79.

== Filmography ==
Year	Title	Role	Notes
1963	Homesick for St. Pauli	Kuddel	
1967	Hotel Clausewitz	Boxer	
1969	Battle of Britain	Reichsmarschall Hermann Göring	
