= Kunibert Gensichen =

German actor

- Born: 26 June 1907
- Died: 26 June 1991 (aged 84)
- Occupation: Actor
- Years active: 1937–1989

Kunibert Gensichen (26 June 1907 – 26 June 1991) was a German actor. He appeared in more than 60 films and television shows between 1937 and 1989.

== Filmography ==
Year	Title	Role	Notes
1937	So weit geht die Liebe nicht	Kapellmeister Schmitt	
1938	The Mountain Calls	Douglas	
1938	Triad		
1940	Die Rothschilds		Uncredited
1941	Above All Else in the World	Reg.-Ass. Glockenburg	
1941	Quax the Crash Pilot	Walter Ottermann, Flugschüler	
1958	Der eiserne Gustav	Pressattaché	
1959	Aus dem Tagebuch eines Frauenarztes	Stammer - Staatsanwalt	
1960	Der Jugendrichter		
1960	Mistress of the World	Reporter Carnot	Uncredited
1960	Freddy and the Melody of the Night	Heini	
1960	Sabine und die 100 Männer	Wilhelm Seefeld	
1961	Zu jung für die Liebe?		
1961	The Marriage of Mr. Mississippi	Informationsminister	Uncredited
1961	Der Transport		
1961	Always Trouble with the Bed		
1961	Blind Justice	Portier	
1982	Doctor Faustus	Riedesel	
