= Made in Germany (film) =

1957 film

- Directed by: Wolfgang Schleif
- Written by: Felix Lützkendorf; Richard H. Riedel
- Produced by: Alexander Grüter; Hans Raspotnik
- Starring: Winnie Markus; Carl Raddatz; Margit Saad; Werner Hinz
- Cinematography: Igor Oberberg
- Edited by: Hermann Ludwig
- Music by: Mark Lothar
- Production company: Corona Filmproduktion
- Distributed by: Deutsche Film Hansa
- Release date: 24 January 1957
- Running time: 97 minutes
- Country: West Germany
- Language: German

Made in Germany is a 1957 West German historical drama film directed by Wolfgang Schleif and starring Winnie Markus, Carl Raddatz, Margit Saad and Werner Hinz. It was shot at the Bendestorf Studios in Lower Saxony. The film's sets were designed by the art directors Erich Kettelhut and Johannes Ott. The film focuses on the collaboration between Ernst Abbe and Carl Zeiss during the nineteenth century at the scientific instrument manufacturer Zeiss. The title makes reference to the Made in Germany export label.

== Synopsis ==
In Jena in the workshops of Carl Zeiss, the scientist Ernst Abbe works on a revolutionary design for microscopes which will help transform the fight against diseases. They battle as well against industrial competition to establish the company of Zeiss as a major global player and focus on improving the lives of the employees as well.

== Cast ==
- Winnie Markus as Elise Abbe, geborene Snell
- Carl Raddatz as Professor Ernst Abbe
- Margit Saad as Adelheid von Eichel
- Werner Hinz as Carl Zeiss
- Dietmar Schönherr as Dr. Roderich Zeiss
- Viktoria von Ballasko as Frau Löber
- Camilla Spira as Ottilie Zeiss
- Paul Dahlke as Werkmeister Löber
- Erich Ponto as Professor Virchow
- Alexander Engel as Kurator von Eggeling
- Heinz Engelmann as Dr. Otto Schott
- Holger Hagen as Dr. Hespe
- Harry Hardt as Professor Snell
- Herbert Hübner as Staatsekretär von Würmb
- Walter Klam as Dr. Malbrand
- Heinz Klevenow as Bismarck
- Maria Martinsen as Frau Donat
- Toni Meitzen as Herr Donat
- Hans Paetsch as Der Großherzog
- Helmut Peine as Professor Binswanger
- Willi Rose as August Bebel
- Arthur Schröder as Dr. Robert Koch
- Siegfried Schürenberg as Cullampton Bubble
- Max Walter Sieg as Sekretär
- Kurt Waitzmann as Dr. Mohr

== Bibliography ==
- Neumann, Andreas & Petzel, Michael. Sir John jagt den Hexer: Siegfried Schürenberg und die Edgar-Wallace-Filme. Schwarzkopf & Schwarzkopf, 2005.
- Prinzler, Hans Helmut. Chronik des deutschen Films 1895–1994. J.B. Metzler, 2016.
