= Walter Andreas Schwarz =

German singer, author, Kabarettist, author of radio dramas and translator

- Promotional picture for the Eurovision Song Contest 1956

Background information
- Born: 2 June 1913; Aschersleben, German Empire
- Died: 1 April 1992 (aged 78) Heidelberg, Germany
- Genres: Chanson, Schlager
- Occupations: Singer, songwriter
- Years active: 1956–1992
- Labels: Ariola

Walter Andreas Schwarz (2 June 1913 – 1 April 1992) was a German singer, songwriter, writer, Kabarettist, translator, author and narrator of audiobooks and radio dramas. In 1956, he became the first German participant at the Eurovision Song Contest.

== Biography ==
=== Early life and education ===
Schwarz was born in Aschersleben on 2 June 1913. His father was born in Brody, Galicia, Austria-Hungary (now in Ukraine) and was Jewish.

After graduating from school in 1932, Schwarz moved to Vienna to study German, French, English and musicology. He was also trained as an actor at the Max Reinhardt Seminar. He had first appearances as a theater actor in Berlin, Hamburg, Frankfurt, Bonn and Mannheim.

=== Nazi persecution ===
His father was deported to the Sachsenhausen concentration camp in 1939, where he was murdered in 1940.

Schwarz himself was also persecuted under the Nuremberg Laws due to his father's Jewish origin. In 1939, he was excluded from the Reichstheaterkammer, which meant that he was not able to work as an actor anymore. He also at some point became stateless. He was later deported to the forced labour camp in Lenne and to the Holzen concentration camp, which he only survived due to one of the commanders there being a former childhood friend. Two of his sisters and one brother also survived the Holocaust.

=== Career and later life ===
In 1948, he started working as a translator for the BBC in London, where he lived for many years. He later also lived in Paris and eventually moved back to Germany.

In 1956, he and Freddy Quinn became the two German participants at the first Eurovision Song Contest, which took place in Lugano, Switzerland. A national final was held prior to the contest. Schwarz participated with a song titled "Im Wartesaal zum großen Glück", which he wrote and composed himself. In the song, whose lyrics contain a lot of surreal imagery, Schwarz criticizes the German Vergangenheitsbewältigung and the attempt of many Germans, especially in the immediate post-war era, to deny the past and sweep their own involvement in the Holocaust under the rug. His placing is not known, but it is rumoured that he finished second.

He later went on to become a successful author and narrator of audiobooks and radio dramas. In 1967, Schwarz produced a radio segment called Wiedergutmachung, which was influenced by his own experiences of trying to receive reparations for the persecution he experienced, criticizing the fact that the German bureaucracy was trying to get him to settle for a small payment.

He also had some small acting roles in various movies and TV series during the 1950s, 1960s and 1970s.

In 1985, he appeared, along with many other former German representatives, as the interval act of the German national final, which was a medley of all German entries until that year.

In 1986, together with Dieter Süverkrüp, he recorded an album containing poems and songs written by Erich Mühsam.

Schwarz, who was never married, died in 1992 in Heidelberg.

== Works ==
=== Discography ===
- Meisterliche Chansons von und mit Walter Andreas Schwarz (1956)
- Im Wartesaal zum großen Glück / Für 300 Francs (1956)
- Die Frucht der Ungesetzlichkeit. Der Deutschen Mai zu Hambach 1832-1982 (1982)
- Der Bürger Karl Marx aus Trier (1983)
- Erich Mühsam: Ich lade Euch zum Requiem (1986)

=== Filmography ===
- Die Galerie der großen Detektive (1954)
- Im Wartesaal zum großen Glück (1965)
- Interpol (1967)
- Der Zauberberg (1968)
- Oliver (1971)

=== Radio dramas and audiobooks ===
- Der Hauptmann von Köpenick (1947)
- Leben und Taten des scharfsinnigen Edlen Don Quijote von La Mancha (1962)
- Krieg und Frieden (1965)
- Die Glocken von Bicêtre (1965)
- Wilhelm Meisters theatralische Sendung (1967)
- Wiedergutmachung (1967)
- Anna Karenina (1967)
- Die goldenen Jahre von St. Germain des Prés (1968)
- Der Untertan (1971)
- Hier spricht London: Radiocollage zum deutschsprachigen Dienst der BBC 1938–1945 (1977)
- Denn alles Fleisch ist wie das Gras (1980)
- Jud Süß (1981)
- 1984 (1984)
- Per Anhalter ins All (1981)
- Die Geschichte der Abderiten (2013, released posthumously)

Preceded by N/A	Germany in the Eurovision Song Contest; 1956 (and Freddy Quinn with So geht das jede Nacht)	Succeeded by Margot Hielscher with Telefon, Telefon
