= Freddy and the Melody of the Night =

1960 film

- Directed by: Wolfgang Schleif
- Written by: Gustav Kampendonk; Aldo von Pinelli
- Starring: Freddy Quinn; Heidi Brühl; Peter Carsten
- Cinematography: Heinz Pehlke
- Edited by: Hermann Ludwig
- Music by: Lotar Olias
- Production company: Melodie Film
- Distributed by: UFA
- Release date: 28 April 1960
- Running time: 93 minutes
- Country: West Germany
- Language: German

Freddy and the Melody of the Night (German: Freddy und die Melodie der Nacht) is a 1960 West German musical film directed by Wolfgang Schleif and starring Freddy Quinn, Heidi Brühl and Peter Carsten.

The film was made by the revived UFA company. It was shot at the Tempelhof Studios in Berlin.

== Cast ==
- Freddy Quinn as Freddy
- Heidi Brühl as Inge
- Peter Carsten as Karl Bachmann
- Kai Fischer as Anka
- Hans Nielsen as Direktor Wendlandt
- Grethe Weiser as Frau Bremer
- Harry Engel as Willi Bremer
- Werner Stock as Paul Kalinke
- Kunibert Gensichen as Heini
- Waltraut Runze
- Bruno W. Pantel as Kneipenbesucher
- Rolf Weih
- Willi Rose as Freddys Chef
- Herbert Weissbach as Onkel Hugo
- Heinz Holl
- Inge Prothmann
- Jürgen Feindt as Tänzer in Nachtclub
- Peter Schiff as Polizist in der Funkzentrale

== Bibliography ==
- Reimer, Robert C. & Reimer, Carol J. The A to Z of German Cinema. Scarecrow Press, 2010.
