= You, You, You =

Single by Ames Brothers

from the album The Best of the Ames Brothers
- B-side: "Once Upon a Time"
- Released: June 27, 1953
- Recorded: 1953
- Length: 2:53
- Label: RCA Victor
- Songwriters: Lotar Olias, Robert Mellin

Ames Brothers singles chronology
"Always in My Mind" (1953)	"You, You, You" (1953)	"(Up A) Lazy River" (1953)

"You, You, You" is a popular song published in 1953. The music was written by Lotar Olias, the original German lyrics by Walter Rothenberg, with English lyrics written by Robert Mellin.

== Ames Brothers recording ==
A recording by the Ames Brothers with Hugo Winterhalter's orchestra and chorus was made at Manhattan Center, New York City on May 16, 1953. It was released by RCA Victor as catalog number 20-5325A (in US) and by EMI on the His Master's Voice label as catalog number B 105431. It became a major hit in the US in 1953 reaching the number one spot in the Billboard chart.

== Other recordings ==
- It was also a minor hit for Mel Carter on Derby Records in 1966, as one of the follow-ups to his hit, "Hold Me, Thrill Me, Kiss Me". This version went to number 49 on the Hot 100.
- Lee Andrews released a version in 1965.
