= Freddy and the Song of the South Pacific =

1962 film

DVD Cover

Freddy and the Song of the South Pacific (German: Freddy und das Lied der Südsee) is a 1962 West German adventure film directed by Werner Jacobs and starring Freddy Quinn, Jacqueline Sassard and Gunnar Möller.

== Partial cast ==
- Freddy Quinn as Freddy Petersen
- Jacqueline Sassard as Mara
- Gunnar Möller as Hein
- Ralf Wolter as Hannes
- Albert Lieven as Siebzehnstern
- Elma Karlowa as Elisabeth
- Heinrich Gretler as Kapitän Brinkhoff
- Hans Deppe as Boco
