= Sabine Sesselmann =

German actress (1936–1998)

- Born: 13 August 1936; Munich, Nazi Germany
- Died: 1 March 1998 (aged 61); Tutzing, Germany
- Other name: Sabina Sesselmann
- Occupation: Actress

Sabine Sesselmann, or Sabina Sesselmann (13 August 1936 – 1 March 1998) was a German film actress.

== Filmography ==
Year	Title	Role	Notes
1957	Mischief in Wonderland		
1958	Madeleine Tel. 13 62 11	Karin	
1958	Liebe kann wie Gift sein	Magdalena Köhler	
1958	U 47 – Kapitänleutnant Prien	Mrs. Ingeborg Prien	
1958	A Song Goes Round the World	Brigitte von Hilden	
1959	Court Martial	Antje Düren	
1959	Freddy, the Guitar and the Sea	Katja	
1959	Morgen wirst du um mich weinen	Thea Hackrath	
1959	Le Bossu	Aurore de Nevers / Isabelle de Caylus	
1959	Der Schatz vom Toplitzsee	Didi Lanz, Löhdes Verlobte	
1960	The Man in the Black Derby	Christine Meißen	
1960	Die Brücke des Schicksals	Inge	
1961	The Devil's Daffodil	Anne Ryder	
1961	Information Received	Sabina Farlow	
1962	The Door with Seven Locks	Sybil Lansdown	
1962	Alarm für Dora X	Inge Kolbach	10 episodes
1964	Die ganze Welt ist himmelblau	Candy	
1964	Coffin from Hong Kong	Janet West	
