= Herbert Weißbach =

German actor

- Born: 12 November 1901; Bernburg, Duchy of Anhalt, German Empire
- Died: 13 October 1995 (aged 93); Berlin, Germany
- Occupations: Actor, cabaret artist
- Years active: 1935–1995

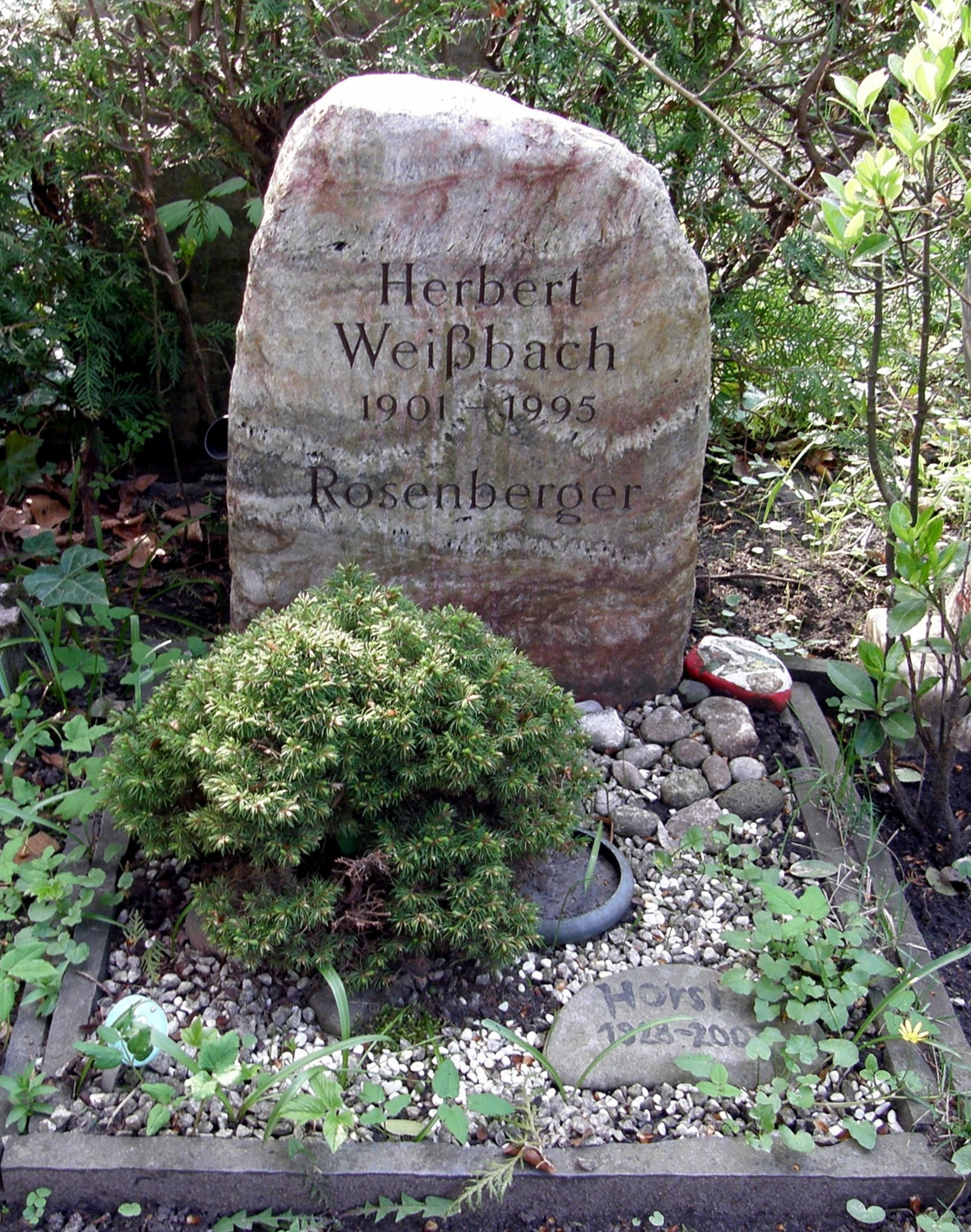
Weißbach's grave at the Friedhof Wilmersdorf in Berlin

Herbert Weißbach (12 November 1901 – 13 October 1995) was a German actor, cabaret artist, and voice actor. Born in Bernburg, he appeared in more than 240 films and television shows between 1935 and 1994.

== Selected filmography ==
- Donogoo Tonka (1936)
- Orders Are Orders (1936)
- I Love You (1938)
- The Great and the Little Love (1938)
- Travelling People (1938)
- You and I (1938)
- Nanon (1938)
- Target in the Clouds (1939)
- Detours to Happiness (1939)
- Ursula Under Suspicion (1939)
- The Sensational Casilla Trial (1939)
- Madame Butterfly (1939)
- Between Hamburg and Haiti (1940)
- Everything for Gloria (1941)
- Love Me (1942)
- Romance in a Minor Key (1943)
- Germanin (1943)
- Light of Heart (1943)
- The Woman of My Dreams (1944)
- Don't Play with Love (1949)
- The Great Mandarin (1949)
- The Cuckoos (1949)
- Dutch Girl (1953)
- The Uncle from America (1953)
- Knall and Fall as Detectives (1953)
- Son Without a Home (1955)
- Heroism after Hours (1955)
- Black Forest Melody (1956)
- The Simple Girl (1957)
- The Count of Luxemburg (1957)
- Tired Theodore (1957)
- The Mad Bomberg (1957)
- And That on Monday Morning (1959)
- Peter Shoots Down the Bird (1959)
- A Glass of Water (1960)
- We Cellar Children (1960)
- Freddy and the Melody of the Night (1960)
- Bankraub in der Rue Latour (1961)
- The Marriage of Mr. Mississippi (1961)
- The Liar (1961)
- A Holiday Like Never Before (1963)
- Dead Woman from Beverly Hills (1964)
- Cat and Mouse (1967)
- Zur Hölle mit den Paukern (1968)
- 24 Hour Lover (1968)
- We Two (1970)
- Zero Hour (1977)
