= The Blue Swords =

1949 film

- Directed by: Wolfgang Schleif
- Written by: Alfred Böttcher
- Starring: Hans Quest; Ilse Steppat; Willy A. Kleinau
- Cinematography: E.W. Fiedler
- Edited by: Hermann Ludwig
- Music by: Walter Sieber
- Production company: DEFA
- Distributed by: Progress Film
- Release date: 30 December 1949
- Running time: 99 minutes
- Country: East Germany
- Language: German

The Blue Swords (German: Die blauen Schwerter) is a 1949 East German historical drama film directed by Wolfgang Schleif and starring Hans Quest, Ilse Steppat and Alexander Engel. It sold more than 3,299,432 tickets. The film portrays the life of Johann Friedrich Böttger. The title refers to the symbol of Meissen, a pair of crossed swords. Böttger's story had previously been turned into a 1935 film The King's Prisoner, released during the Nazi era.

The sets were designed by the art directors Karl Schneider and Erich Zander. It was shot at the Babelsberg Studios in East Berlin.

== Synopsis ==
Johann Böttger, an alchemist of the early eighteenth century, is held prisoner by the Elector of Saxony who wants him to discover the secret of gold production. Failing to accomplish this, which he knows to be impossible, Böttger instead works to develop porcelain.

== Cast ==
- Hans Quest as Johann Böttger
- Ilse Steppat as Frau von Tschirnhausen
- Alexander Engel as Herr von Tschirnhausen
- Herbert Hübner as Nehmitz
- Willy A. Kleinau as August der Starke
- Marianne Prenzel as Katharina
- Paul Wagner as König Friedrich I.
- Werner Pledath as Kreisamtmann von Wittenberg
- Klaus Miedel as Laskari
- Rolf Weih as Leutnant Menzel
- Albert Bessler as Finanzminister
- Siegfried Dornbusch as Köhler
- Hans Emons as Wildenstein
- Hans Fiebrandt as Gehilfe von Dünnbrot
- Harry Gillmann as Hauknecht im "König von Portugal"
- Sonja Hartke as Maitresse
- Alfred Maack as Wirt "König von Portugal"
- Margarete Schön as Frau Zorn
- Otto Stoeckel as Graf Wartenberg

== See also ==
- The King's Prisoner (1935)

== Bibliography ==
- Séan Allan & Sebastian Heiduschke. Re-Imagining DEFA: East German Cinema in its National and Transnational Contexts. Berghahn Books, 2016.
