= Stalingrad: Dogs, Do You Want to Live Forever? =

1959 film directed by Frank Wisbar

- Directed by: Frank Wisbar
- Written by: Fritz Wöss
- Screenplay by: Frank Wisbar, Frank Dimen, Heinz Schröter
- Produced by: Alf Teichs
- Starring: Joachim Hansen
- Cinematography: Helmut Ashley
- Edited by: Martha Dübber
- Music by: Herbert Windt
- Production company: Deutsche Film Hansa
- Release date: 7 April 1959
- Running time: 97 minutes
- Country: West Germany
- Language: German

Stalingrad: Dogs, Do You Want to Live Forever? (German: Hunde, wollt ihr ewig leben) is a 1959 West German war film directed by Frank Wisbar and based on the eponymous novel by Fritz Wöss. The movie revolves around the Battle of Stalingrad. The title is drawn from Frederick the Great's words when he saw his soldiers fleeing at Kolin: "You cursed rascals, do you want to live forever?"

== Plot ==
In 1942, while impatiently waiting for orders after being discharged from the hospital, German Lieutenant Gerd Wisse arranges for a pretty but desperate Russian woman named Katja to get a job, so she can avoid being deported to Germany.

Wisse is sent to serve as a liaison officer with a Romanian division near Stalingrad. There is another German officer stationed there, Major Linkmann, but Wisse is not under his command. Linkmann looks down on their ally, in contrast to Wisse. Romanian General Codreanu, in command of the division, fears the worst: his unit is covering far too wide a front (19 km rather than the usual 5–6) and thus has no reserves, is badly equipped, and has been fighting continuously since summer. Further, reports indicate the Russians are planning something big.

Soon after Wisse's arrival, the Red Army attacks both to the north and south of Stalingrad, breaking through and encircling the Germans, who retreat into the city of Stalingrad. The Romanian division is also forced eastward into the pocket. During the flight, Linkmann tries to flee, but is stopped by Wisse. Later, Wisse coerces a sergeant into ignoring orders to burn down a supply depot; Wisse allows soldiers to carry off whatever food and other supplies they want without restriction. Finally, he torches the place to keep it out of the hands of the advancing Soviets.

Despite the desperate situation, Hitler refuses to allow the surrounded forces to try to break out. The Luftwaffe tries to supply the trapped troops by air, but can only manage 20% of what is requested, then less and finally nothing, as the airfields are captured by the advancing Russians. Linkmann is reassigned to command an artillery unit in Stalingrad.

Hermann Hoth attempts to reach the trapped men with his panzer army group, but Friedrich Paulus, commander of the forces in Stalingrad, refuses to disobey Hitler's order to stand fast, despite the pleas of his subordinates to break out and try to link up with Hoth. In the end, Hoth is forced to withdraw after learning that the Soviets have broken through the defenses of the Italian 8th Army, exposing his flanks.

In Stalingrad, Wisse is put under Linkmann's command. The tensions between them soar, while the starving German soldiers become demoralized. Wisse is pursued by the Soviets, so he disguises himself as a Russian soldier. He stumbles into a group of Russians being fed; he encounters Katja there. She does not betray him, but directs him back to German lines. Eventually, Linkmann tries to desert, and is shot dead by Wisse.

Field Marshal Paulus has been commanded to fight to the last man, but he eventually orders his men to surrender, and Wisse and 90,000 other survivors trudge into captivity.

== Cast ==
- Joachim Hansen as Wisse
- Wilhelm Borchert as Friedrich Paulus
- Wolfgang Preiss as Linkmann
- Carl Lange as General von Seydlitz
- Karl John as Hermann Hoth
- Horst Frank - Feldwebel Böse
- Peter Carsten as Obergefreiter Kraemer
- Richard Münch as Oberstleutnant Kesselbach
- Günter Pfitzmann as Wachtmeister Kunowski
- Sonja Ziemann as Katja
- Gunnar Möller as Leutnant Fuhrmann
- Ernst von Klipstein as General
- Armin Dahlen as Major Stanescu
- Paul Hoffmann as General Codreanu
- Alexander Kerst as Kriegspfarrer Busch
