= U 47 – Kapitänleutnant Prien =

1958 film

U 47 – Kapitänleutnant Prien U 47 – Lieutenant Commander Prien
- Directed by: Harald Reinl
- Produced by: Gero Wecker
- Starring: Dieter Eppler; Sabine Sesselmann
- Cinematography: Ernst W. Kalinke
- Edited by: Hein Haber
- Music by: Norbert Schultze
- Production company: Arca-Filmproduktion GmbH
- Distributed by: Constantin Film
- Release date: 25 September 1958
- Running time: 87 min.
- Country: West Germany
- Language: German

U 47 – Kapitänleutnant Prien (English: U 47 – Lieutenant Commander Prien) is a 1958 black-and-white German war film portraying the World War II career of the U-boat captain Günther Prien. It stars Dieter Eppler and Sabine Sesselmann and was directed by Harald Reinl.

== Plot ==
The film begins shortly after the outbreak of World War II when Günther Prien reports to the commander of the U-boat force, Karl Dönitz. Dönitz orders Prien as commander of U-47 to infiltrate the Royal Navy's primary base at Scapa Flow to inflict as much damage as possible. Prien accomplishes his mission and receives a hero's welcome on his return.

Following these events, pastor Kille, a former schoolmate of Prien, approaches Prien in need of help. Kille offers refuge to victims of Nazi oppression. Prien initially declines, stating he is a soldier and not involved in politics. The attempt by Kille's sister Alwine, who is engaged to Prien's first officer Thomas Birkeneck, also fails to convince Prien.

As the war progresses, Prien is plagued by his bad conscience, asking himself if his attitude is correct. A dramatic incident occurs following the sinking of a freighter. U-47 rescues two survivors. These turn out to be German refugees who are trying to escape from Nazi Germany. The two choose to remain at sea over the prospect of returning to Germany.

Prien finally believes, that as a figure of public interest, he could influence and change something for the better. He goes to visit the imprisoned pastor Kille. Prien promises him help, not realizing that their conversation is being monitored. Thus Prien himself attracts the attention of the Gestapo, the secret police.

The visit remains without consequences for Prien. U-47 is sunk on its next war patrol. Prien and his cook (Der Smut) are rescued by a British ship, which is then sunk by another German submarine under the command of Prien's former first officer, Birkeneck. Prien's hat is retrieved from the sea, putting Birkeneck in a state of shock. Subsequently, he fails to give the order to dive on time and his boat is sunk by attacking enemy aircraft.

== Historical accuracy ==
The story is loosely based on Prien's combat record and command of submarine U-47. His most famous exploit was the sinking of the British battleship HMS Royal Oak at anchor in the Home Fleet's anchorage in Scapa Flow. His achievements as U-boat commander were highly idolized by Joseph Goebbels' Ministry of Public Enlightenment and Propaganda.

Every character depicted in the film, except for Prien and Admiral Dönitz, who is not mentioned by name in the film, is fictitious. Prien's portrayal as an active member of the German resistance is also fictitious. U-47's destruction and Prien's death is another invention of the movie makers. To date, there is no official record of what happened to U-47 or her 45 crewmen. The submarine shown in the film was the Spanish submarine G-7, formerly the German submarine U-573.

== Cast ==
- Dieter Eppler as Captain Günther Prien
- Sabine Sesselmann as Mrs. Ingeborg Prien
- Joachim Fuchsberger as Oberleutnant Thomas Birkeneck
- Harald Juhnke as Der Smut—the cook
- Uta Hallant as Alwine
- Olga Chekhova as Die Fürstin—the princess
- Richard Häussler as the German U-Boat Fleet Commander
- Raidar Müller-Elmau as Leutnant Bluhm
- Ernst Reinhold as Leutnant Raufuss
- Matthias Fuchs as Jörg
- Horst Naumann as the Ingenieur—engineer
- Dieter Borsche as pastor Kille
