= Freddy Quinn =

Austrian singer and actor (born 1931)

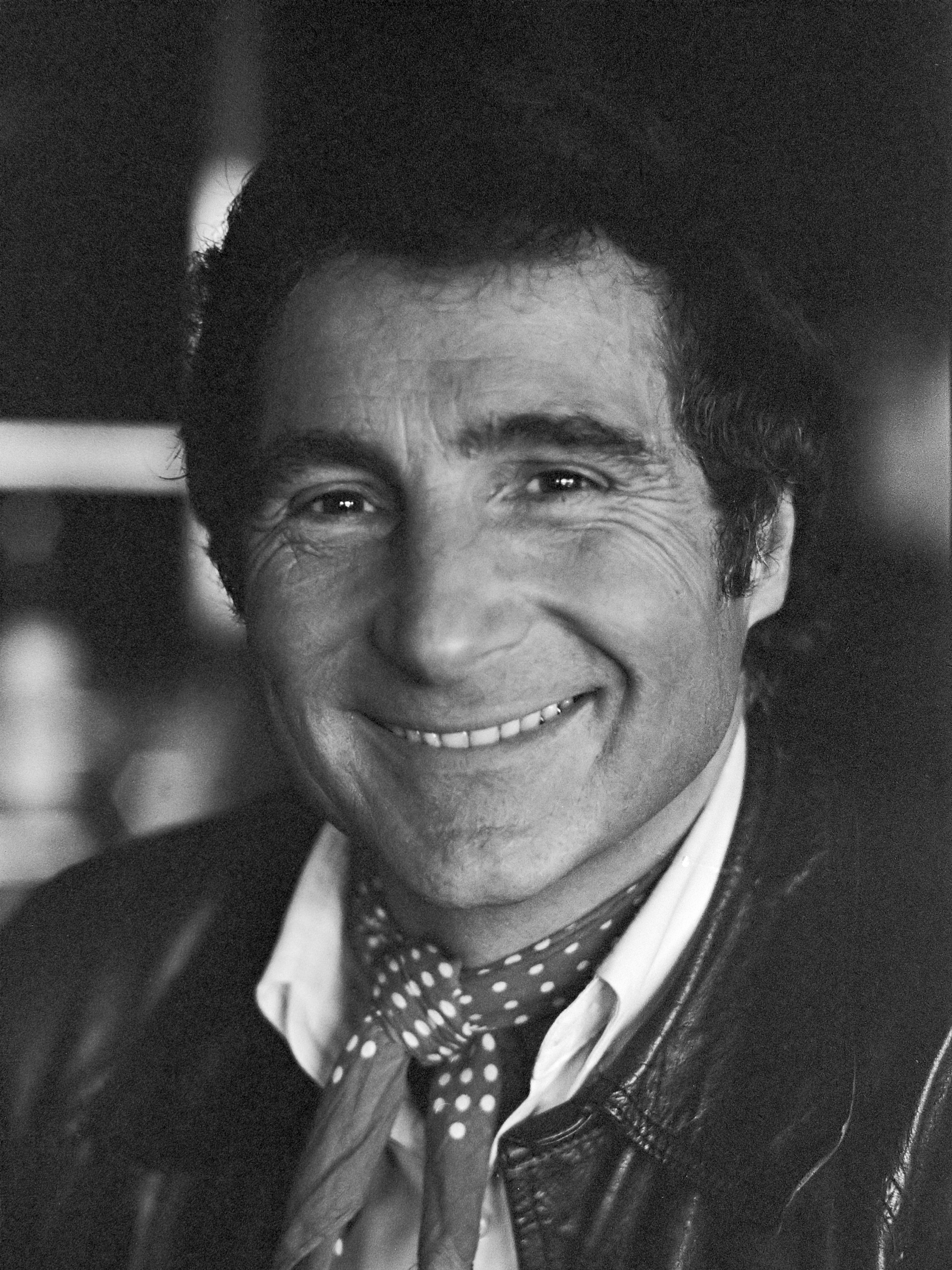
- Quinn in 1977

Background information
- Born: Franz Eugen Helmut Manfred Nidl; 27 September 1931 (age 95); Niederfladnitz, Austria
- Occupations: Musician, actor
- Instruments: Vocalist, guitar
- Years active: 1953–2009
- Website: Freddy Quinn Archive (in German)

Freddy Quinn (born Franz Eugen Helmut Manfred Nidl; 27 September 1931) is a former Austrian singer and actor whose popularity in the German-speaking world soared in the late 1950s and 1960s. As Hans Albers had done two generations before him, Quinn adopted the persona of the rootless wanderer who goes to sea but longs for a home, family and friends. His father was long believed to be a supposed merchant named Johann Quinn (1912–1943), who was of Irish descent and was said to have been married to Quinn's mother for a few months in 1934. However, in his 2025 autobiography, Freddy Quinn wrote that this man never existed and that he never met his actual father; furthermore, he had adopted his Irish last name from an American soldier he had met in his early twenties. His mother, Edith Henriette Nidl, was an Austrian journalist. He is often associated with the Schlager scene.

== Biography ==
Quinn was born in Niederfladnitz, Lower Austria, and grew up in Vienna. Through his mother's second marriage to Rudolf Anatol Freiherr von Petz, Quinn adopted the name Nidl-Petz.

The following paragraph presents events as they were publicly known up to 2025. The veracity of some of this information is doubtful or at least not entirely certain.

Quinn experienced the end of World War II in Hungary, where he had been sent to as part of the children's evacuation program due to the bombing of Vienna. Fleeing the Red Army, he encountered US forces near Pilsen. His fluent English allowed him to convincingly pass himself off as an American. In May 1945, he was transported to the US by military transport, finally arriving on Ellis Island, where he (allegedly) learned that his (alleged) father had died in a traffic accident in 1943.

Quinn was subsequently sent back to Europe and spent a year in a reform school in Antwerp due to difficulties with his identity documents. There, he attended a general education school and learned Dutch and French.

Upon moving to Germany, he was "discovered" in St. Pauli, Hamburg, and was offered his first recording contract in 1954. He represented Germany at the Eurovision Song Contest 1956 in Lugano, Switzerland, with the atypical song, "So geht das jede Nacht", about an unfaithful girlfriend who dates many men. He did not win, and the full results of the contest were never released so his placement is not known. Most of his other songs are about Hamburg, the endless sea and the solitary life in faraway lands. His first hit record was "Heimweh" ("Homesickness", a.k.a. "Brennend heisser Wüstensand", "Dort wo die Blumen blüh'n" and "Schön war die Zeit", (1956), a German version of Dean Martin's "Memories Are Made of This". It sold over one million copies, and was awarded a gold disc.

Other hits, often with him simply billed as Freddy, followed: "Die Gitarre und das Meer" (1959), "Unter fremden Sternen" (1959), "Irgendwann gibt's ein Wiedersehn" (1960), "La Paloma" (1961), "Junge, komm bald wieder" (1962). His 1964 offering "Vergangen, vergessen, vorüber" was another million-selling release.

His popularity waned in the 1970s, but Quinn continued performing. "Junge, komm bald wieder" was sung by Alpay on 7 Dilde Alpay (Turkish for "Alpay in Seven Languages") album, which was released in 1973.

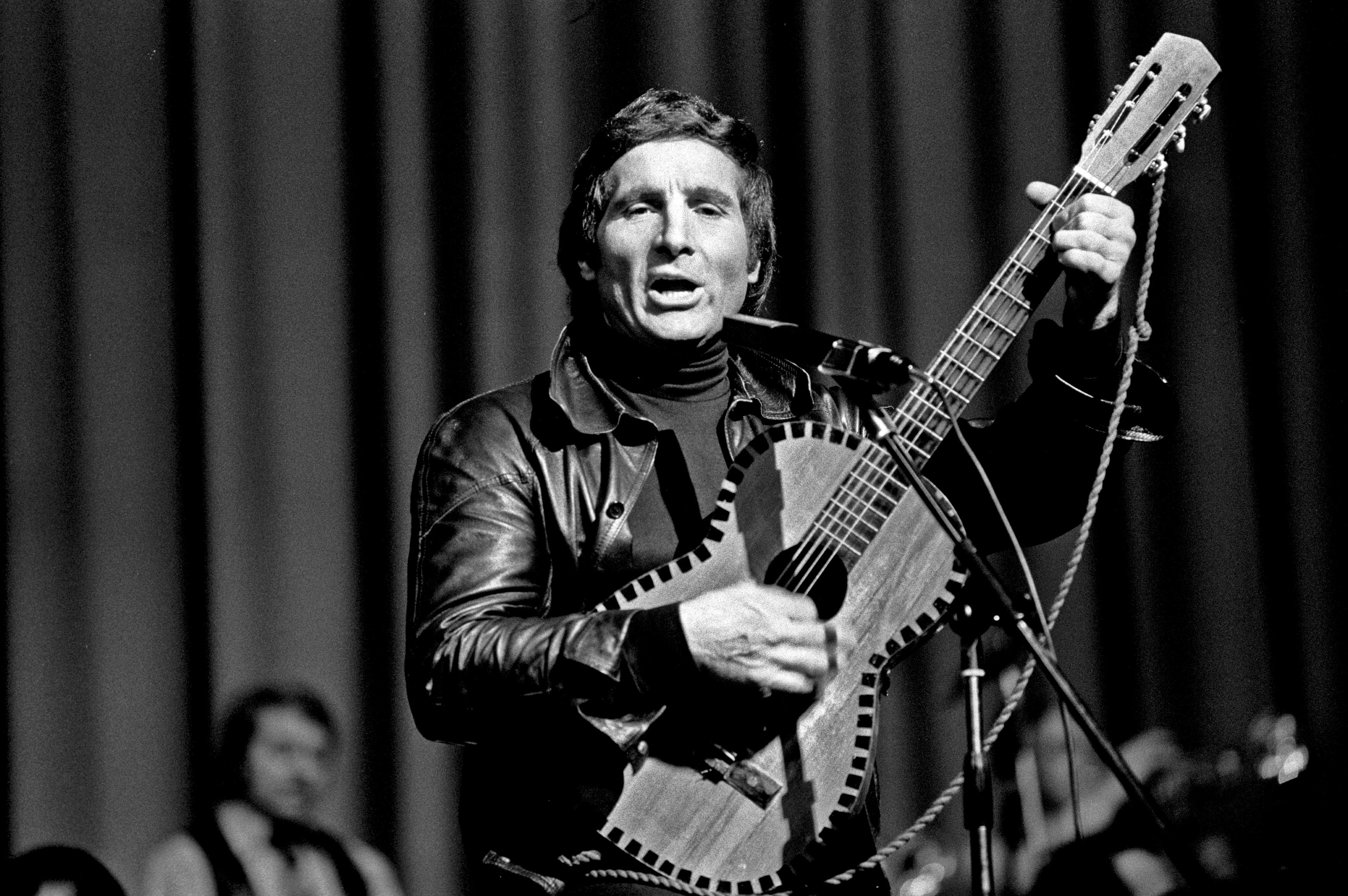
Quinn performing in Hamburg, West Germany, in 1971

Starting in the late 1950s, Quinn also acted in several movies, again frequently cast as the seafaring loner. Titles include Freddy, the Guitar and the Sea (1959), Freddy unter fremden Sternen (1959), Freddy and the Song of the South Pacific (1962), and Homesick for St. Pauli (1963). Subsequently, Quinn also performed on the stage in such diverse roles as Prince Orlofsky in Die Fledermaus, the king in The King and I, and Lord Fancourt Babberly in Charley's Aunt.

Quinn was also an accomplished circus performer who stunned television audiences as a tightrope walker, performing live and without a safety net.

== Selected filmography ==
- The Big Chance (1957)
- Freddy, the Guitar and the Sea (1959)
- Freddy and the Melody of the Night (1960)
- Only the Wind (1961)
- Freddy and the Millionaire (1961)
- Freddy and the Song of the South Pacific (1962)
- Homesick for St. Pauli (1963)
- Freddy in the Wild West (1964)
- Sharks on Board (1971)
- The Roaring Fifties (1983)

Preceded by N/A	Germany in the Eurovision Song Contest; 1956 (and Walter Andreas Schwarz with Im Wartesaal zum großen Glück)	Succeeded by Margot Hielscher with Telefon, Telefon
