= The Morgenrot Mine =

1948 film

- Directed by: Erich Freund; Wolfgang Schleif
- Written by: Joachim Barckhausen; Alexander Stenbock-Fermor
- Produced by: Adolf Hannemann
- Starring: Claus Holm; Maria Rouvel; Gisela Trowe
- Cinematography: E.W. Fiedler
- Edited by: Hermann Ludwig
- Music by: Wolfgang Zeller
- Production company: DEFA
- Distributed by: Progress Film
- Release date: 9 July 1948
- Running time: 88 minutes
- Country: Germany
- Language: German

The Morgenrot Mine (German: Grube Morgenrot) is a 1948 German drama film directed by Erich Freund and Wolfgang Schleif and starring Claus Holm, Maria Rouvel and Gisela Trowe. It was produced in the Soviet Zone which would become East Germany the following year by DEFA. Interiors were filmed at the Johannisthal Studios in East Berlin while location shooting took place at mines in Oelsnitz and Zwickau. The film's sets were designed by the art director Franz F. Fürst.

== Synopsis ==
After the Second World War, the Morgenrot coal mine has been closed but a worker's collective receives permission to reopen it from the Allied occupiers. The older miners recall the events of 1931 during the Great Depression when the pit was faced with closure due to being unprofitable. With the agreement of the foreman Ernst Rothkegel, against his Socialist instincts, a dangerous new working process was adopted by the owners. This led ultimately to a huge disaster in which many miners lost their lives and the mine was closed anyway. Rothkegel returns, having been imprisoned in a concentration camp by the Nazis for his beliefs, and throws his support behind the new worker's initiative.

== Cast ==
- Claus Holm as Ernst Rothkegel
- Maria Rouvel as Ilse Gomolla
- Hans Klering as Henschel
- Gisela Trowe as Hertha Rothkegel
- Albert Venohr as Wagner
- Lothar Firmans as Direktor Hoffmann
- Karl Hellmer as Buckel-Jakob
- Aribert Grimmer as Himmelsziege
- Arno Paulsen as Gomolla
- Hans Emons as Boxer
- Johannes Bergfeldt as Schäfer
- Walter Weinacht as Vater Bautzmann
- Lotte Loebinger as Frau Rothkegel
- Magdalene von Nußbaum as Frau Gomolla
- Charlotte Küter as Boxers Frau
- Erwin Jander as Junger Kumpel
- Max Kühne as Bergrat
- Oskar Kaesler as Dr. Becker
- Gustav Wehrle as Betriebsleiter
- Fred Mahr as Ingenieur
- Kurt Apitius as Polizeihauptmann
- Josef Tietze as Maschinist

== Bibliography ==
- Hake, Sabine. German National Cinema. Routledge, 2002.
- Karl, Lars & Skopal, Pavel. Cinema in Service of the State: Perspectives on Film Culture in the GDR and Czechoslovakia, 1945–1960. Berghahn Books, 2015.
