= Willi Rose =

German actor

- Born: 4 February 1902; Berlin, German Empire
- Died: 16 June 1978 (aged 76); West Berlin, West Germany
- Occupation: Actor
- Years active: 1936–1978

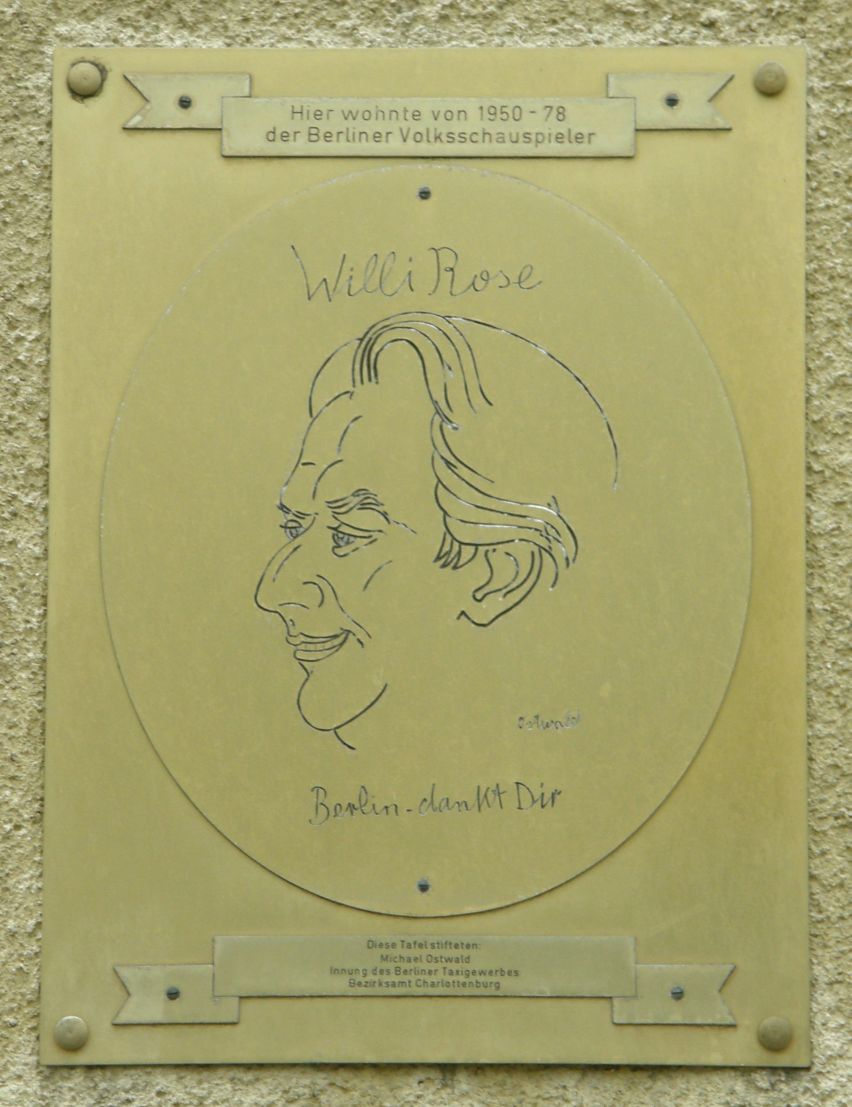
Memorial Plaque in Berlin-Westend

Wilhelm Bernhard Max Rose (4 February 1902 – 16 June 1978) was a German actor. He appeared in more than one hundred films from 1936 to 1978.

== Selected filmography ==
Year	Title	Role	Notes
1975	The Net		
1970	Die Feuerzangenbowle		
1967	When Night Falls on the Reeperbahn		
1961	You Must Be Blonde on Capri		
1961	One Prettier Than the Other		
1960	We Cellar Children	Vater Prinz	
1960	Freddy and the Melody of the Night	Freddy's Chef	
1959	The Scarlet Baroness		
1958	Two Hearts in May	Engelmann	
1957	The Girl Without Pyjamas		
1957	Made in Germany		
1956	The Captain from Köpenick		
1955	Urlaub auf Ehrenwort		
1955	Operation Sleeping Bag		
1955	My Leopold		
1954	Circus of Love		
1952	The Blue and White Lion		
1951	Queen of the Night		
1950	The Rabanser Case		
1949	Girls in Gingham		
1947	And If We Should Meet Again		
1944	The Black Robe		
1943	Circus Renz		
1943	Melody of a Great City		
1942	Secret File W.B.1		
1941	Above All Else in the World		
1941	U-Boote westwärts		
1941	Riding for Germany		
1940	Twilight		
1940	The Girl at the Reception		
1939	Uproar in Damascus		
1939	The Sensational Casilla Trial		
1939	Target in the Clouds		
1939	Legion Condor		
1938	The Four Companions		
1937	The Divine Jetta		
1937	Patriots		
1936	The Impossible Woman		
1936	The Traitor		
