= Lotar Olias =

German composer

- Born: 23 December 1913; Königsberg, East Prussia; German Empire
- Died: 21 October 1990 (aged 76); Hamburg, Germany
- Other name: Lothar Olias
- Occupation: Composer
- Years active: 1937-1967 (film)

Lotar Olias (23 December 1913 – 21 October 1990) was a German composer who worked on numerous film scores. He composed the tune of the 1953 song You, You, You.

== Selected filmography ==
- Artists' Blood (1949)
- The Thief of Bagdad (1952)
- That Can Happen to Anyone (1952)
- Fritz and Friederike (1952)
- Salto Mortale (1953)
- The Uncle from America (1953)
- Everything for Father (1953)
- Money from the Air (1954)
- Roses from the South (1954)
- Marriage Sanitarium (1955)
- Emperor's Ball (1956)
- The Big Chance (1957)
- Black Forest Cherry Schnapps (1958)
- The Blue Moth (1959)
- The Night Before the Premiere (1959)
- Freddy, the Guitar and the Sea (1959)
- The Merry War of Captain Pedro (1959)
- Freddy and the Melody of the Night (1960)
- Freddy and the Millionaire (1961)
- Freddy in the Wild West (1964)

== Bibliography ==
- Tyler, Don. Hit Songs, 1900-1955: American Popular Music of the Pre-Rock Era. McFarland, 2007.
