= Nuremberg rallies =

1923–1938 Nazi Party celebratory events

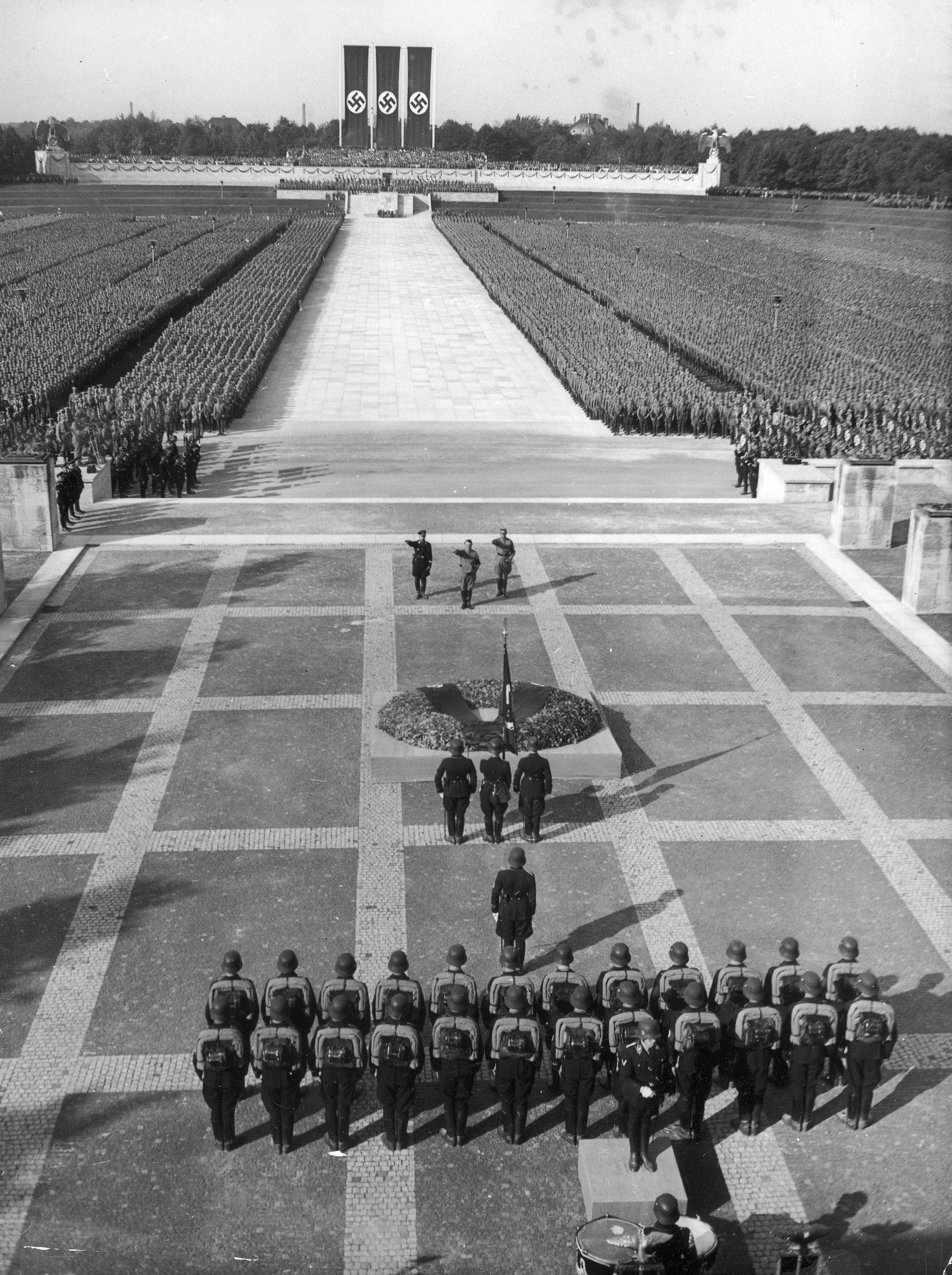
The Totenehrung, or "Honoring of the Dead", at the 1934 Nuremberg Rally. Adolf Hitler, Heinrich Himmler, and SA leader Viktor Lutze stand in front of the Ehrenhalle, or "Hall of Honor".

The Nuremberg rallies (German: Reichsparteitag (German pronunciation), meaning 'Reich Party Congress') were a series of celebratory events coordinated by the Nazi Party and held in the German city of Nuremberg from 1923 to 1938. The first nationwide party convention took place in Munich in January 1923, but the location was shifted to Nuremberg that September. The rallies usually occurred in late August or September, lasting several days to a week. They played a central role in Nazi propaganda, using mass parades, "military rituals", speeches, concerts, and varied stagecraft methods to project the image of a strong and united Germany under Nazi leadership.

The rallies became a national event following Adolf Hitler's rise to power in 1933, and were thereafter held annually. Once the Nazi dictatorship was firmly established, party propagandists began filming the rallies for a national, and international, audience. Nazi filmmaker Leni Riefenstahl produced several films, including Triumph of the Will (1934) and The Victory of Faith (1933), at the rally grounds in Nuremberg. The 1938 rally celebrated the Anschluss—Germany's annexation of Austria—which occurred earlier that year.

The planned 1939 rally was cancelled due to Germany's invasion of Poland. Scheduled to begin on 2 September, this rally was ironically called the Reichsparteitag des Friedens, or "Rally of Peace". The regime never held another rally, as Germany prioritized its efforts in the Second World War. By March 1940, construction at the rally grounds had "almost halted", although prisoners of war continued work as late as 1943, being housed in barracks originally "erected for rally participants".

== History and purpose ==
The first Nazi "Party Day" was held in 1920 by the "National Socialist German Workers' Association", the precursor of the Brownshirts. Early party rallies occurred in 1923 at Munich, and in 1926 at Weimar. At the 1926 rally, Hitler was able to hold "both the general parade as well as the consecration of the flags" at Weimar, where he spoke about the meaning of the Nazi flag as "some three hundred" of the banners were displayed on stage behind him.

=== Political purpose ===
The rallies were not a "decision-making body", and Hitler did not allow their "parliamentarization". Rather, their purpose was to "instill the Hitler myth deeply into the hearts of the faithful", with "rituals", "fireworks", and "invocations surrounding the flag" all playing a part. Nuremberg was "designed from the start as a place for show and spectacle", and not for "debates on the intricacies of party policy". Hitler himself declared that the rallies should be a "clear and understandable demonstration of the will and the youthful strength" of the party, while Propaganda Minister Joseph Goebbels said that the rallies changed a participant "from a little worm into part of a large dragon".

From 1927 onward, party rallies took place exclusively in Nuremberg. The party chose Nuremberg because of its "rich history", as the "city had been the diet of the Holy Roman Empire" in the medieval era. The Nazis also began calling it "the most German of German cities". Diehard anti-Semite Julius Streicher, who published the militant Der Stürmer newspaper, also led the Nuremberg regional party, and the city had been a "hotbed of Nazi support" during the movement's rise to power. Lastly, the Luitpoldhain park gave Nuremberg the "advantage of a large open space for mass gatherings".

=== Content of rallies and architectural design ===
Hitler chose architect Albert Speer to improve the rally complex and, in the summer of 1933, Speer "reshaped Nuremberg" to make it "suitable for hosting what was now the party in power". In 1934, he enlarged the Zeppelin Field structures and built them in stone, specifically pink and white granite. In Speer's own words, he designed a "mighty flight of stairs topped and enclosed by a long colonnade, flanked on both ends by stone abutments. Undoubtedly it was influenced by the Pergamum altar". Hitler agreed with Speer's plan, and the finished stadium had a capacity of hundreds of thousands of people. Speer also used lighting to highlight the architecture—and present Hitler in an impressive way—with "130 aircraft searchlights" arranged around and above the stadium. Speer's so-called "Cathedral of Light", or Lichtdom, was a key feature of the event, and has been described as the "single most dramatic moment of the Nazi Party rallies". The Flak Searchlight-34 and -37 models used for the effect were developed in the 1930s, and had "an output of 990 million candelas".

Rallies opened with Richard Wagner's 1868 opera, Die Meistersinger von Nürnberg, performed by the Berlin State Opera, and ceremonies included a parade where district party flags were touched to the Blutfahne, the flag used during the failed Beer Hall Putsch coup attempt of 1923. The rally ended with a speech from Hitler. Spotlights focused on the "place where Hitler entered the arena", and music played from "multiple bands, orchestras, and loudspeakers" as he approached the podium. Hitler's speeches at Nuremberg have been described, like his other speeches, as "less about meaningful content and more about creating a dramatic impact using a mishmash of stereotypes, rhetorical devices, and emotionally-charged language".

==== Nuremberg Laws ====
During a special Reichstag meeting at the 1935 Nuremberg rally, the German government enacted the Nuremberg Laws, stripping German Jews of their citizenship, making the swastika banner the official national flag, and banning "marriage and sexual relationships between Jews and non-Jews". The Nuremberg Laws have been described as the "most notorious" piece of anti-Semitic legislation enacted by Hitler's regime.

The Nuremberg Laws were based not on religion, but on race, being grounded on the idea that "racial identity" was "transmitted irrevocably through the blood" of Jewish ancestors. Personally designed by Hitler and proclaimed on 15 September 1935, the laws were "among the first of the racist Nazi laws that culminated in the Holocaust".

== Rallies ==
Adolf Hitler saluting at the crowd during the Nuremberg rally in September 1935.

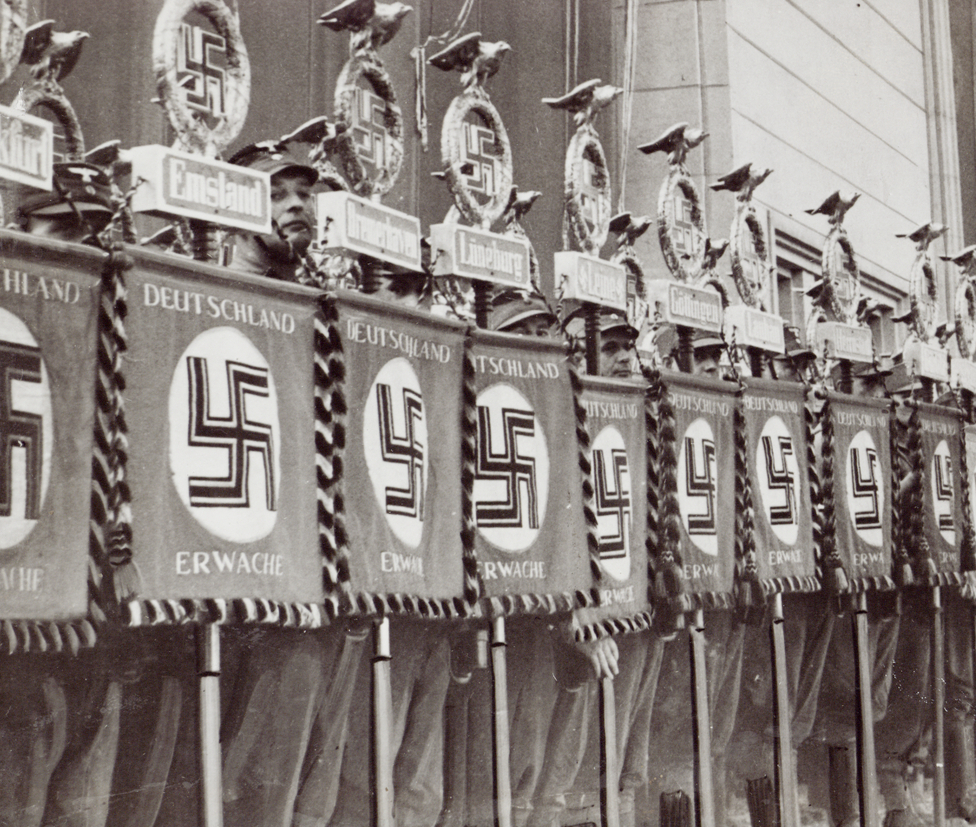
10th annual Nazi congress in Nurnberg (1933)

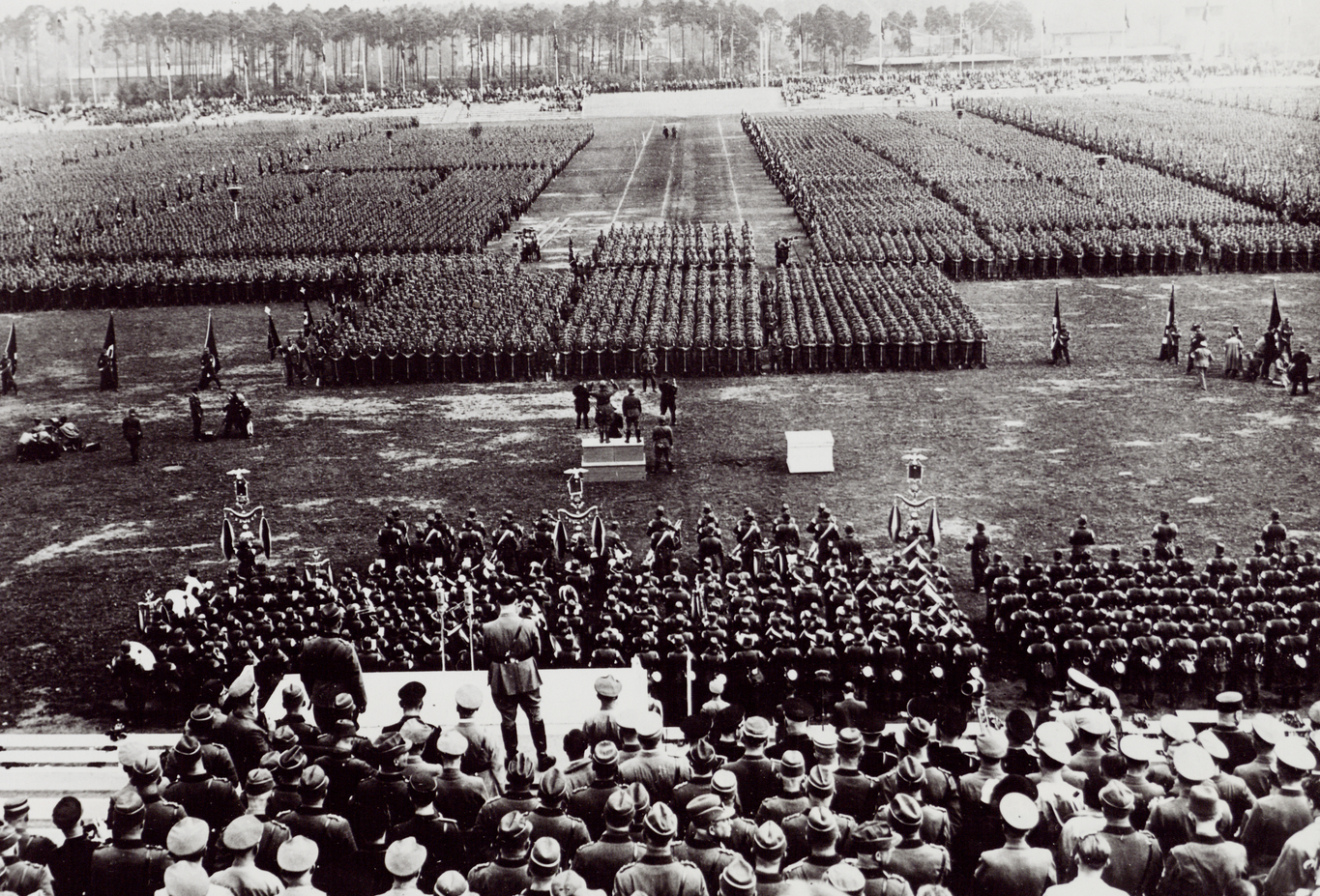
50 000 labor corps members addressed by Hitler at the 1934 Nuremberg rally. Hitler is seen from the back.

Each rally was given a programmatic title, which related to recent national events:

- 1923: The First Party Congress took place in Munich on 27 January 1923.
- 1923: The "German Day Rally" was held in Nuremberg, 1–2 September 1923.
- 1926: The 2nd Party Congress ("Refounding Congress") was held in Weimar, 3–4 July 1926.
- 1927: The 3rd Party Congress ("Day of Awakening") was held in Nuremberg, 19–21 August 1927. The propaganda film Eine Symphonie des Kampfwillens was made at this rally.
- 1929: The 4th Party Congress, known as the "Day of Composure", was held in Nuremberg, 1–4 August 1929. The propaganda film Der Nürnberger Parteitag der NSDAP was made at this rally. Attendees received the Nuremberg Party Day Badge.
- 1933: The 5th Party Congress was held in Nuremberg, 31 August – 3 September 1933. It was called the "Rally of Victory" (Reichsparteitag des Sieges). The term "victory" relates to the Nazi seizure of power and the victory over the Weimar Republic. The Leni Riefenstahl film Der Sieg des Glaubens was made at this rally. Hitler announced that from then on all rallies would take place in Nuremberg.
- 1934: The 6th Party Congress was held in Nuremberg, 5–10 September 1934, which was attended by about 700,000 Nazi Party supporters. Initially it did not have a theme. Later it was labeled the "Rally of Unity and Strength" (Reichsparteitag der Einheit und Stärke), "Rally of Power" (Reichsparteitag der Macht), or "Rally of Will" (Reichsparteitag des Willens). The Leni Riefenstahl film Triumph des Willens was made at this rally. This rally was particularly notable due to Albert Speer's Cathedral of light: 152 searchlights that cast vertical beams into the sky around the Zeppelin Field to symbolise the walls of a building.
- 1935: The 7th Party Congress was held in Nuremberg, 10–16 September 1935. It was called the "Rally of Freedom" (Reichsparteitag der Freiheit). "Freedom" referred to the reintroduction of compulsory military service and thus the German "liberation" from the Treaty of Versailles. Leni Riefenstahl made the film Tag der Freiheit: Unsere Wehrmacht (Day of Freedom: Our Armed Forces) at this rally, and the Nazis introduced the Nuremberg Laws.
- 1936: The 8th Party Congress was held in Nuremberg, 8–14 September 1936. It was known as the "Rally of Honour" (Reichsparteitag der Ehre). The remilitarization of the demilitarized Rhineland in March 1936 constituted the restoration of German honour in the eyes of many Germans. The film Festliches Nürnberg incorporated footage shot at this rally, as well as the rally of 1937.
- 1937: The 9th Party Congress was held in Nuremberg, 6–13 September 1937. It was called the "Rally of Work" (Reichsparteitag der Arbeit). It celebrated the reduction of unemployment in Germany since the Nazi rise to power.
- 1938: The 10th Party Congress was held in Nuremberg, 5–12 September 1938. It was named the "Rally of Greater Germany" (Reichsparteitag Großdeutschland). This was due to the annexation of Austria to Germany that had taken place earlier in the year.
- 1939: The 11th Party Congress, scheduled for 2–11 September 1939, was given the name "Rally of Peace" (Reichsparteitag des Friedens). It was meant to reiterate the German desire for peace, both to the German population and to other countries. It was cancelled at short notice, as one day before the planned start date, Germany began its offensive against Poland, starting World War II on 1 September 1939.

== Propaganda films ==
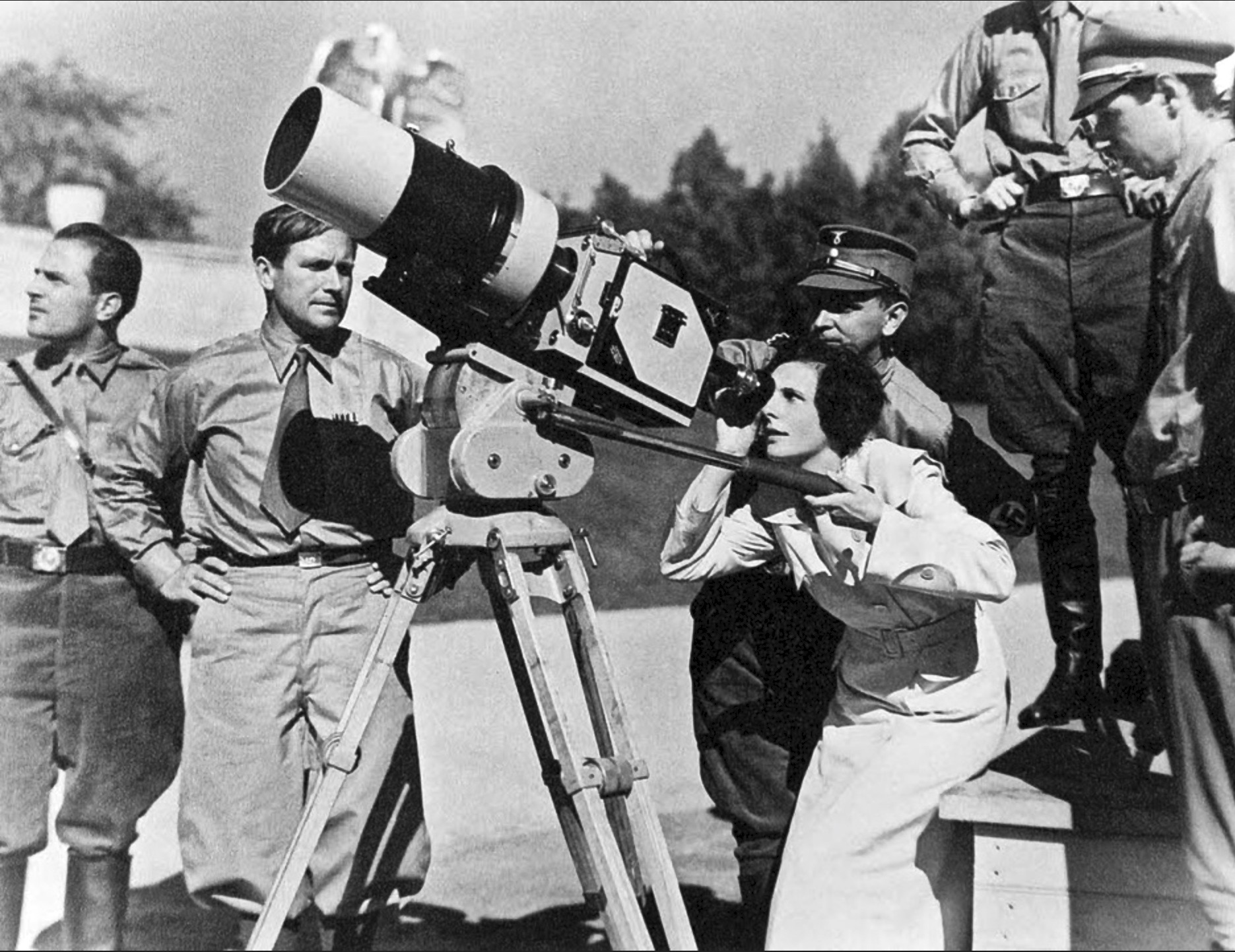
Leni Riefenstahl films Triumph of the Will on location in 1934.

The first film to document a Nuremberg rally was A Symphony of the Will to Fight, released in 1927. The most famous films, however, were made by director Leni Riefenstahl for the rallies between 1933 and 1935. Her first movie, Victory of Faith (Der Sieg des Glaubens), was released in 1933. Because the film featured SA chief Ernst Röhm, who was later killed on Hitler's orders in the 1934 Night of the Long Knives, almost all copies of Der Sieg des Glaubens were destroyed. It was considered a lost film until a copy was found in East Germany's film archives in the 1980s.

The rally of 1934 became the setting for Riefenstahl's award-winning Triumph of the Will (Triumph des Willens). In 1935 she made Day of Freedom: Our Armed Forces (Tag der Freiheit: Unsere Wehrmacht), focusing on the German Army, because the army felt it was not represented well enough in Triumph of the Will. Riefenstahl, who lived until 2003, would face lifelong controversy because of her films and closeness to the regime.

The 1936 and 1937 rallies were covered in the short film Festliches Nürnberg, directed by Hans Weidemann.

== Rally books ==
There were two sets of official, or semi-official, books covering the rallies. The so-called "Red books" were officially published by the Nazi Party and contained the proceedings of each rally, along with the full text of speeches.

The "Blue books" were published initially by Julius Streicher, the Gauleiter of Nuremberg, and later by Hanns Kerrl, not by the party press. These were larger scale books that included excerpts of speeches in addition to photographs.

Alongside these books, collections of photos by Hitler's official photographer, Heinrich Hoffman, were published to commemorate each Party congress, as well as pamphlets of Hitler's speeches. Hoffman created 100-image series on the 1936, 1937, and 1938 rallies.

== See also ==
- Adolf Hitler March of German Youth
- Propaganda in Nazi Germany
- Ruins of the Reich
- Nazi Party rally grounds
