= Festliches Nürnberg =

- Directed by: Hans Weidemann
- Starring: Adolf Hitler; Hermann Göring; Other Nazi Leaders
- Distributed by: Reichsparteitagsfilm
- Release date: 1937 (Berlin)
- Running time: 21 minutes
- Country: Germany
- Language: German

Festliches Nürnberg (English: Festive Nuremberg) is a short 1937 propaganda film chronicling the Nazi Party rallies in Nuremberg, Germany in 1936 and 1937. The film was directed by Hans Weidemann.

== Synopsis ==
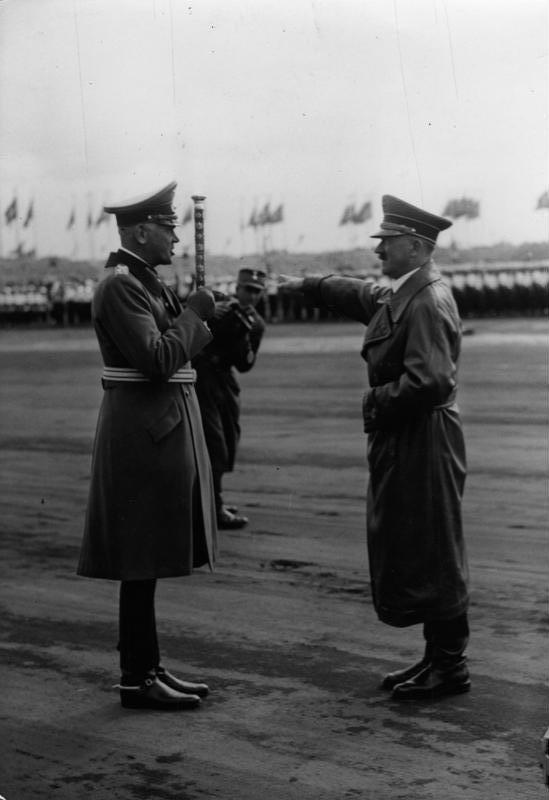
Werner von Blomberg meeting Hitler at the 1937 Nazi party rally

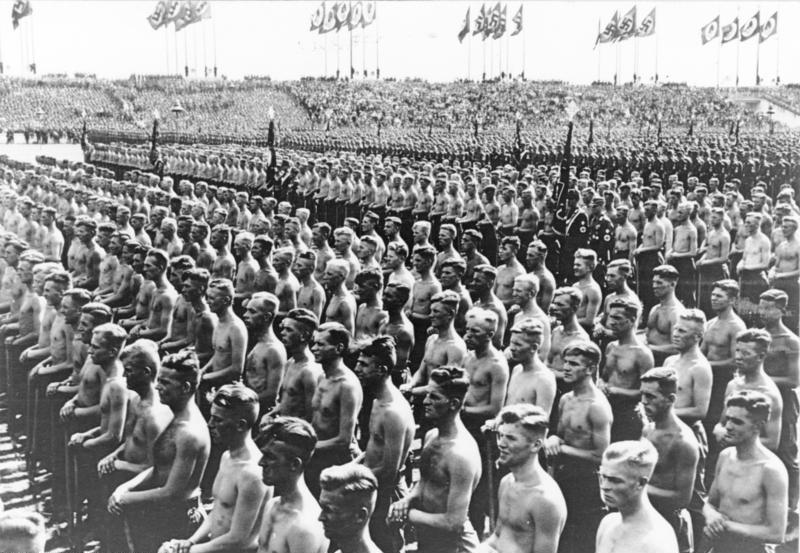
Workmen parading at the 1937 Nazi party rally

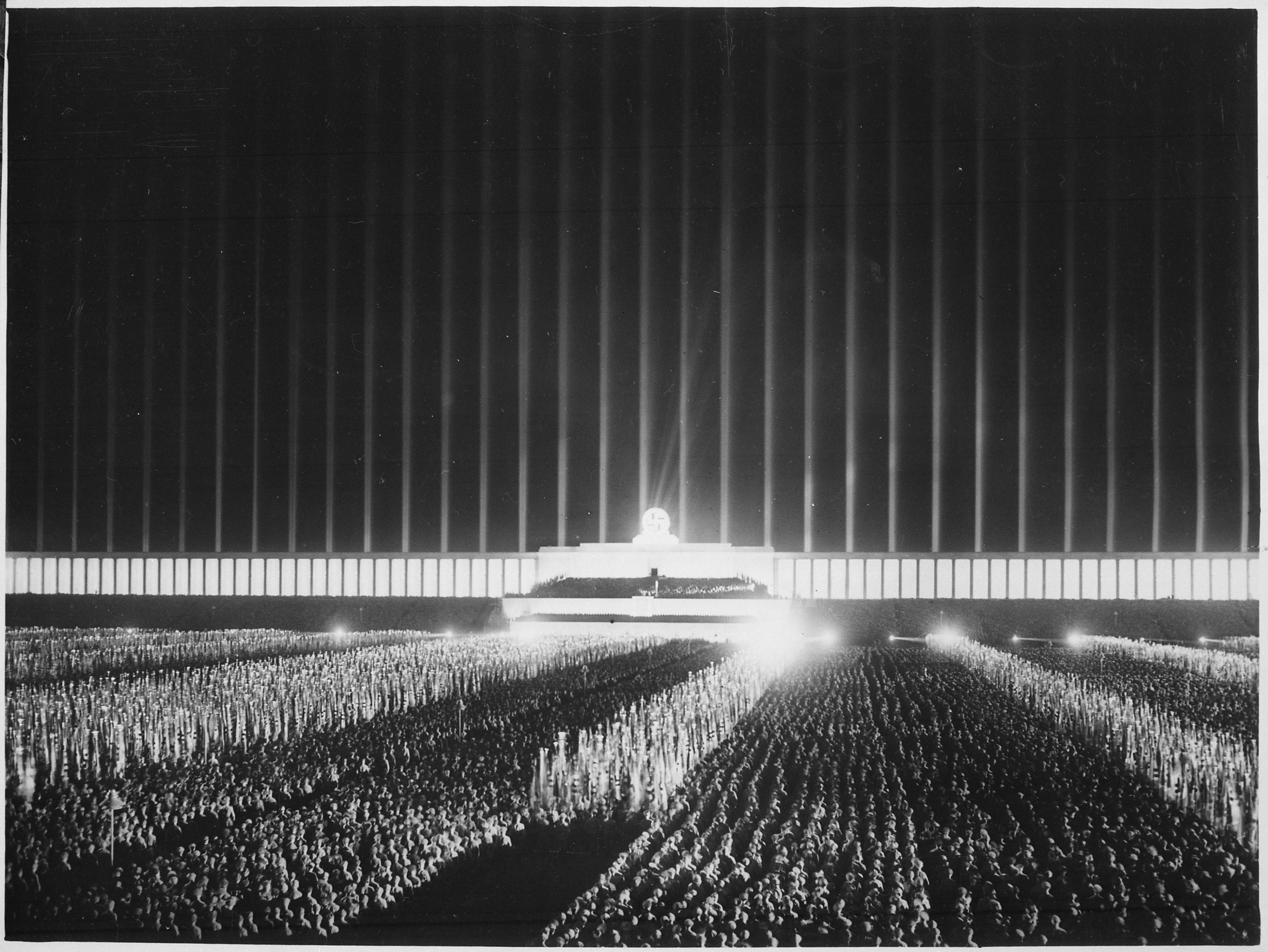
Searchlight background at the 1937 Nazi party rally

The film runs in colour for only 21 minutes (the downloadable version at the Internet archive is monochrome only and has no English translation of the little commentary that exists), containing footage of the 8th and 9th Nuremberg Rallies. Particularly notable scenes of both the rally and the film are images of Albert Speer's lighting techniques during the 9th Nuremberg rally on 10 September 1937, in which he positioned 134 searchlights circling the Zeppelin field on which the rally was taking place. The beams of these spotlights, forming the "cathedral of light", merged into the general glow at an estimated height of 20,000 feet, and would be used for more practical purposes after war was declared in 1939.

The film is relatively short at only about 21 minutes compared with the longer Triumph des Willens and Der Sieg des Glaubens made by Leni Riefenstahl in 1934 and 1933 respectively. It adopts the same heavy style of adoration of Hitler with many scenes of marching SS men and Wehrmacht soldiers as well as navy personnel and flying aircraft overhead. With some prescience, scenes of soldiers parading in tanks and other vehicles (with guns firing) assume great prominence. The film concludes with sequences of folk dances and gymnastic displays, followed by a torchlight parade and a brief speech from Hitler.

== Background ==
Since the formation of the Nazi Party in 1923, annual rallies had taken place at Nuremberg, mainly orchestrated by the Minister for Popular Enlightenment and Propaganda Joseph Goebbels. The Nazi party also called upon architect Albert Speer to create a number of spectacles to inspire the German population. The 8th and 9th of these rallies were known as the "Rally of Honor" (Reichsparteitag der Ehre) and the "Rally of Labor" (Reichsparteitag der Arbeit) respectively for 1937 and 1938. The rally for 1939 would be known as the "Rally for Peace" but was postponed indefinitely as war approached in September 1939.

The reasons for scaling down the film compared to the much longer Riefenstahl films of 1933 and 1934 are not known. Many of the film sequences follow Riefenstahl quite closely, such as the introduction using aerial shots of the city of Nuremberg. The score uses Richard Wagner's Die Meistersinger von Nürnberg for musical accompaniment.
