= Seesaw searchlight =

Seesaw searchlights were an early electric powered searchlight first developed in the 1870s used in conjunction with coast artillery.

The searchlight consisted of an electric carbon lamp, capable of a strong beam for target illumination. Because the bulb was vulnerable to enemy fire, it was protected in a recessed emplacement whilst a large mirror, attached to the end of a 'see-saw' pivoting iron beam reflected the beam across the water to the target. The light was powered by steam engines usually housed in the nearby forts.

Only a few of these were built anywhere in the British Empire, and were difficult to operate and were never successful. New Zealand's example had been abandoned by 1899.

== Surviving examples ==
No complete examples have survived but concrete emplacements can still be found at:

- Fort Ballance, Wellington, New Zealand
- Fort Victoria, Isle of Wight
- Warden Point Battery on the Isle of Wight

== See also ==
- Military applications of searchlight
  - Canal Defence Light
  - Turbinlite
  - Leigh light
  - G-numbers
  - German searchlights of World War II
