= Cathedral of Light =

Feature of the Nazi Party rallies in Nuremberg

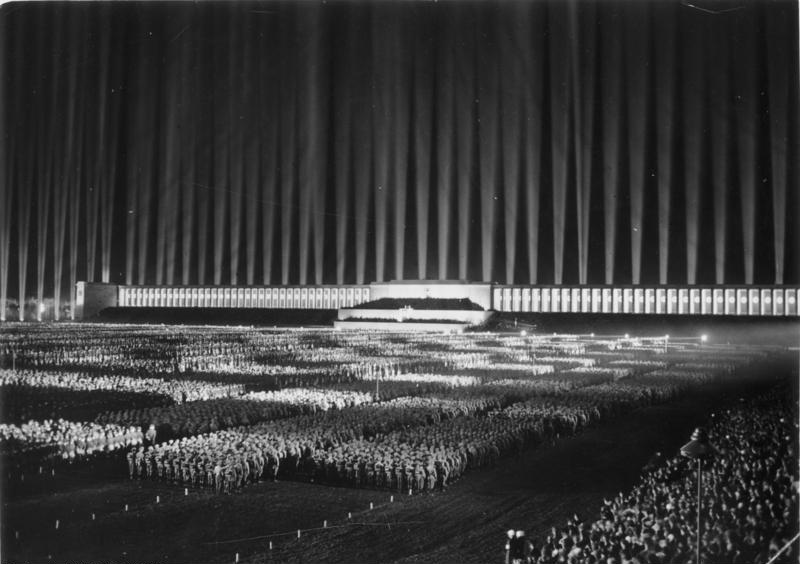
The Cathedral of Light above the Zeppelintribüne (1936)

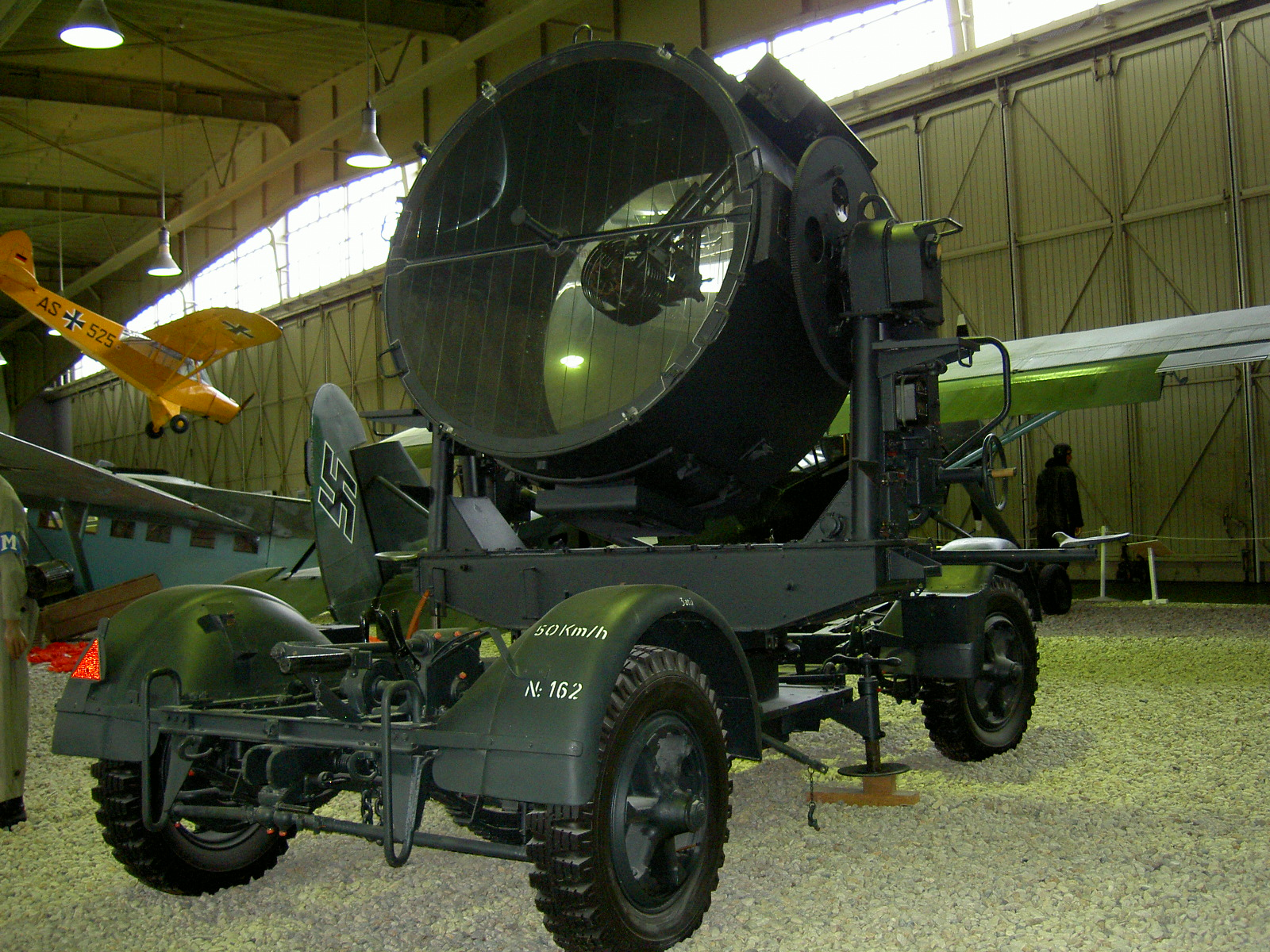
A German 150 cm searchlight displayed at the Militärhistorisches Museum Flugplatz Berlin-Gatow, 2003

The Cathedral of Light or Lichtdom was a main aesthetic feature of the Nazi Party rallies in Nuremberg from 1934 to 1938. Designed by architect Albert Speer, it consisted of 152 anti-aircraft searchlights, at intervals of 12 metres, aimed skyward to create a series of vertical bars surrounding the audience. The Cathedral of Light was documented in the Nazi propaganda film Festliches Nürnberg, released in 1937.

== Background ==
Speer had been commissioned by Adolf Hitler to build a stadium for the annual party rallies, but the stadium could not be completed in time for the 1933 rally. As a stopgap, he used 152 antiaircraft searchlights pointed upwards around the assembly area.

The searchlights were borrowed from the Luftwaffe, which caused problems with its commander Hermann Göring, because they represented most of Germany's strategic reserve. Hitler overruled him, suggesting that it was a useful piece of disinformation. "If we use them in such large numbers for a thing like this, other countries will think we're swimming in searchlights."

== Continued use ==
Though they had originally been planned as a temporary measure until the stadium was completed, they continued to be used afterwards for the party rallies. A similar effect was created for the closing ceremony of the 1936 Olympic Games in Berlin by Eberhard von der Trappen with Speer's collaboration. Variants of the effect had the searchlights converge to a point above the spectators.

== Equipment and impact ==
The Flak Searchlights used were developed in the late 1930s and used 150-centimeter (5-foot) -diameter parabolic glass reflectors with an output of 990 million candelas (1 billion candlepower). The system was powered by a 24-kilowatt generator, based around a 51-horsepower (38 kW) 8-cylinder engine, giving a current of 200 amperes at 110 volts. The searchlight was attached to the generator by a cable 200 m (660 ft) long. The system had a detection range of about 8 km (5 mi) for targets at an altitude of 4,000–5,000 m (13,000–16,000 ft).

Speer described the effect: "The feeling was of a vast room, with the beams serving as mighty pillars of infinitely high outer walls". The British Ambassador to Germany, Sir Neville Henderson, described it as "both solemn and beautiful... like being in a cathedral of ice".

It is still considered amongst Speer's most important works:

...the single most dramatic moment of the Nazi Party rallies... was not a military parade or a political speech but the Lichtdom, or Cathedral of Light...

— Kathleen James-Chakraborty

== See also ==
- A Symphony of Lights – Permanent Hong Kong light and sound show
- Architecture of the Night – Architecture integrating and emphasizing electric light effects at the design stage
- Documentation Center Nazi Party Rally Grounds – Museum in Nuremberg, Germany
- German searchlights of World War II – Use of searchlights during World War II
- Imagine Peace Tower – Memorial to John Lennon near Reykjavík
- spectra (installation) – Series of art installations by Ryoji Ikeda
- Tribute in Light – Annual tribute to 9/11 victims
