= Paul Marantz =

American architectural lighting designer (1938–2025)

- Born: Paul Murat Marantz; April 27, 1938; Elizabeth, New Jersey, U.S.
- Died: May 26, 2025 (aged 87); New York City, U.S.
- Education: Oberlin College
- Occupation: Lighting designer
- Spouse(s): Marsha Heller (divorced) Jane (m. 1977)
- Children: 2

Paul Murat Marantz (April 27, 1938 – May 26, 2025) was an American architectural lighting designer, whose work includes the discothèque Studio 54, the Times Square Ball, the Tribute in Light, the Barnes Foundation, and the Burj Khalifa. He was a founder of the lighting design firm Fisher Marantz Stone.

== Education and early career ==
Marantz was born in Elizabeth, New Jersey on April 27, 1938. He received a B.A. from Oberlin College and did graduate work at Case Western Reserve University and Brooklyn College. In 1968, he established an architectural lighting design firm with Jules Fisher.

== Personal life and death ==
Marantz was married to Marsha Heller and had one son, but later divorced. He married Jane in 1977, and had another son. He died from a stroke at his home in Manhattan, New York City, on May 26, 2025, at the age of 87.

== Selected projects ==
- Barnes Foundation
- Burj Khalifa
- Byzantine Fresco Chapel
- Carnegie Hall Restoration
- Grand Central Terminal Restoration
- Islamic Cultural Center of New York
- Miho Museum
- New York Public Library, Rose Main Reading Room Restoration
- Reflecting Absence, The National September 11 Memorial
- Studio 54
- Times Square Ball
- Lighting standards for the redevelopment of Times Square
- Tribute in Light

== Awards and honors ==
Marantz received numerous Lumen Citations from the Illuminating Engineering Society of North America (IES) for projects including the J. Paul Getty Museum, the restoration of Radio City Music Hall, the Times Square Ball, the Museum of Fine Arts, Houston, and the Byzantine Fresco Chapel. He received the International Association of Lighting Designers (IALD) Award for Excellence for the Islamic Cultural Center of New York and the San Francisco Museum of Modern Art, and he received an IALD Citation for the restoration of the Rainbow Room. New York Times architecture critic Herbert Muschamp described Marantz, as a “lighting genius.”
