= Adolf Hitler March of German Youth =

Adolf Hitler March of German Youth Adolf-Hitler-Marsch der deutschen Jugend
- Status: Historic
- Genre: March
- Frequency: Annually
- Country: Germany
- Participants: 2000

The Adolf Hitler March of German Youth (German: Adolf-Hitler-Marsch der deutschen Jugend) was a yearly rally of some 2,000 Hitler Youth who marched from all parts of Nazi Germany to the Nuremberg Rally of the Nazi Party, where they participated to the general parade. For some groups the task was quite demanding having to cover by foot as many as 800 kilometres (500 mi). They had to be "combat ready" (Wehrhaftmachung) anyway as this was the password given to them by their leader Baldur von Schirach.

After 1937, the march was extended beyond Nuremberg to Landsberg am Lech whose fortress saw on 11 November 1923 Adolf Hitler greeted and escorted by thirty-nine guards to the broad and comfortable cell n. 7 which became his residence for some thirteen months. The aim of visiting that famous cell was to inculcate in those young and bound followers an apologetic and unconditional appreciation of the "supreme leader".

== Bibliography ==
- Zentner, Christian; Bedürftig, Friedemann, eds. (1991). The Encyclopedia of the Third Reich. New York City: Macmillan. ISBN 978-002897500-9.
