= Tribute in Light =

Annual tribute to 9/11 victims

Coordinates: 40°42′27″N 74°00′54″W

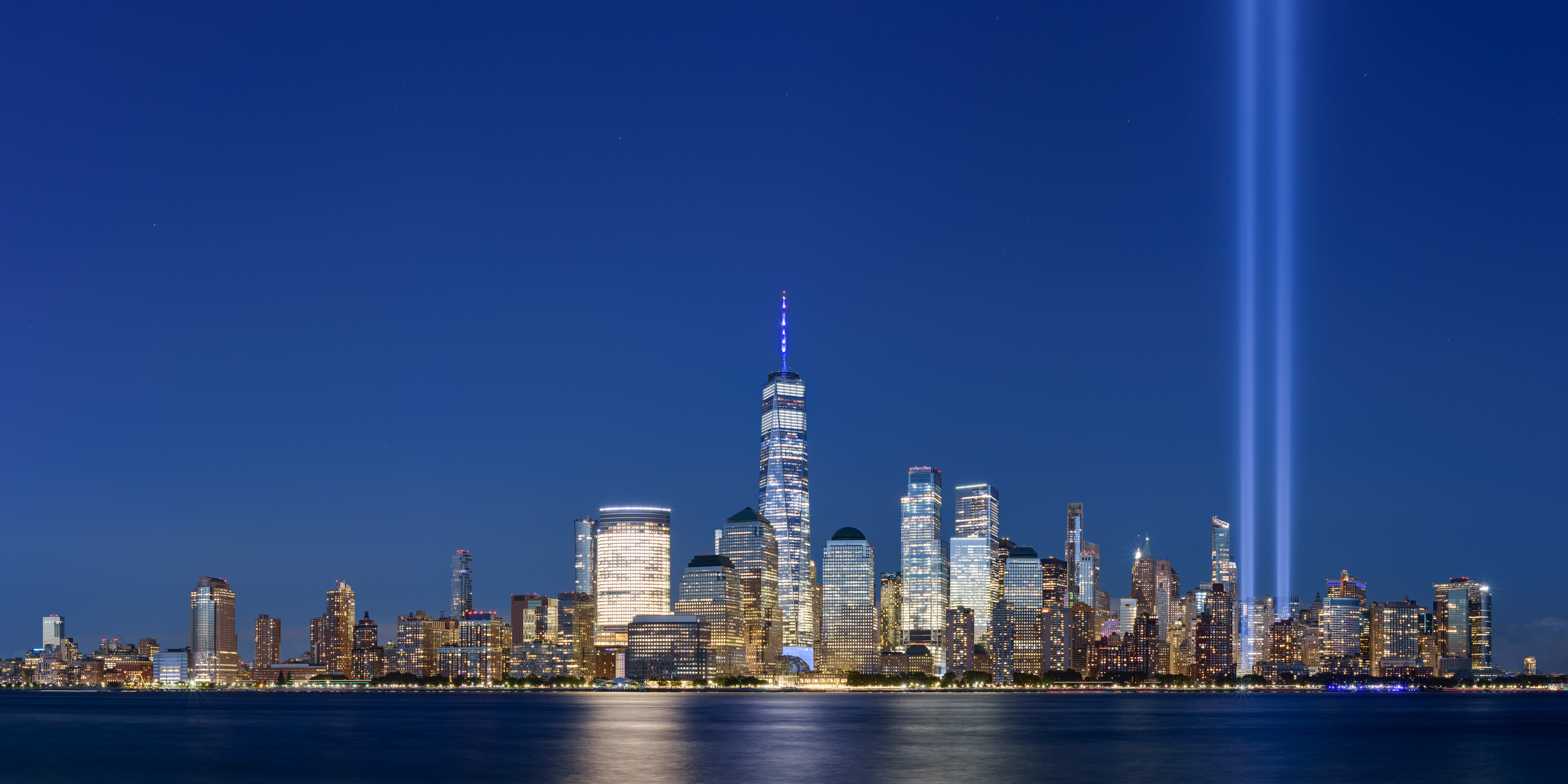
Tribute in Light as seen from Jersey City in 2020

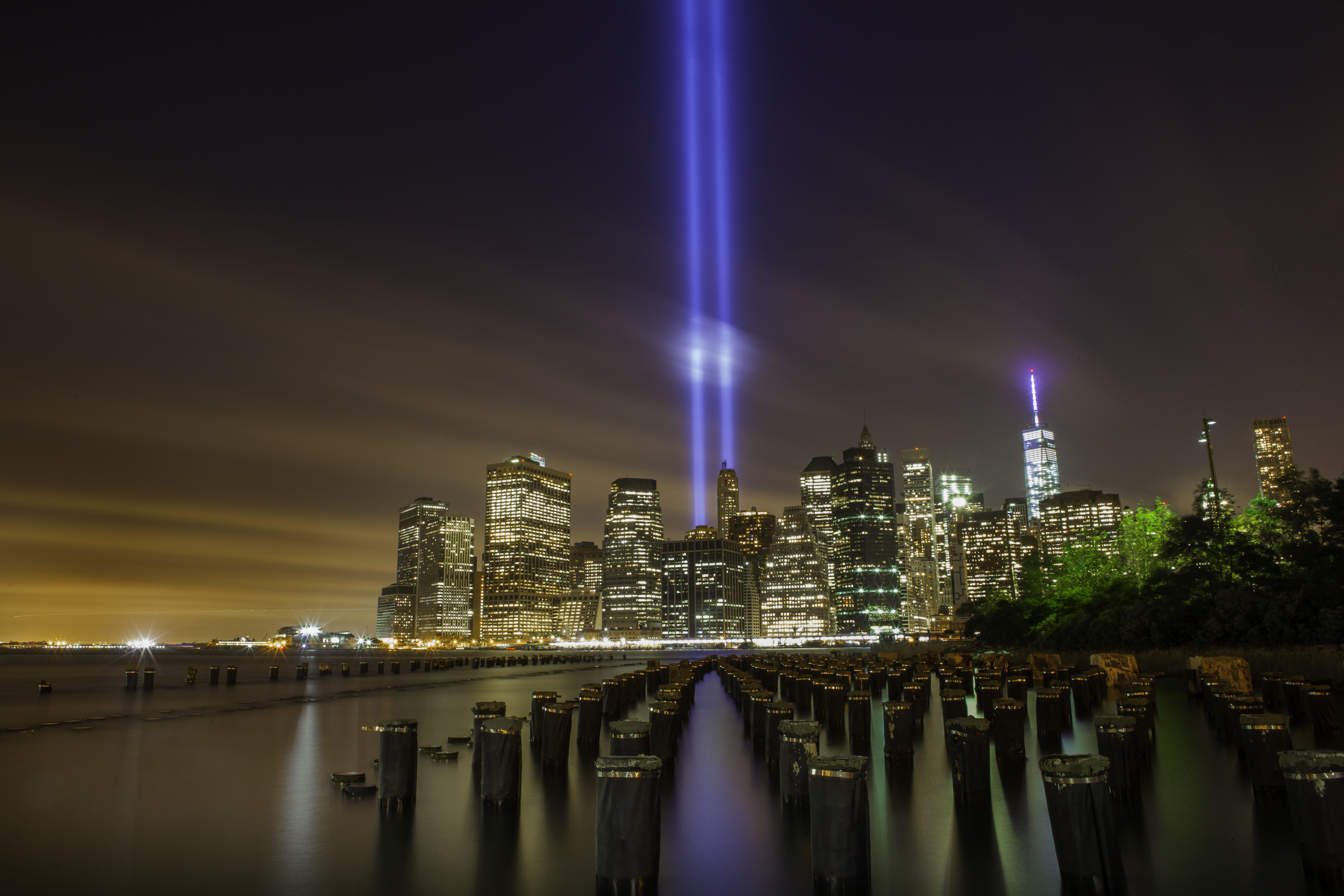
Tribute in Light as seen from Brooklyn in 2014

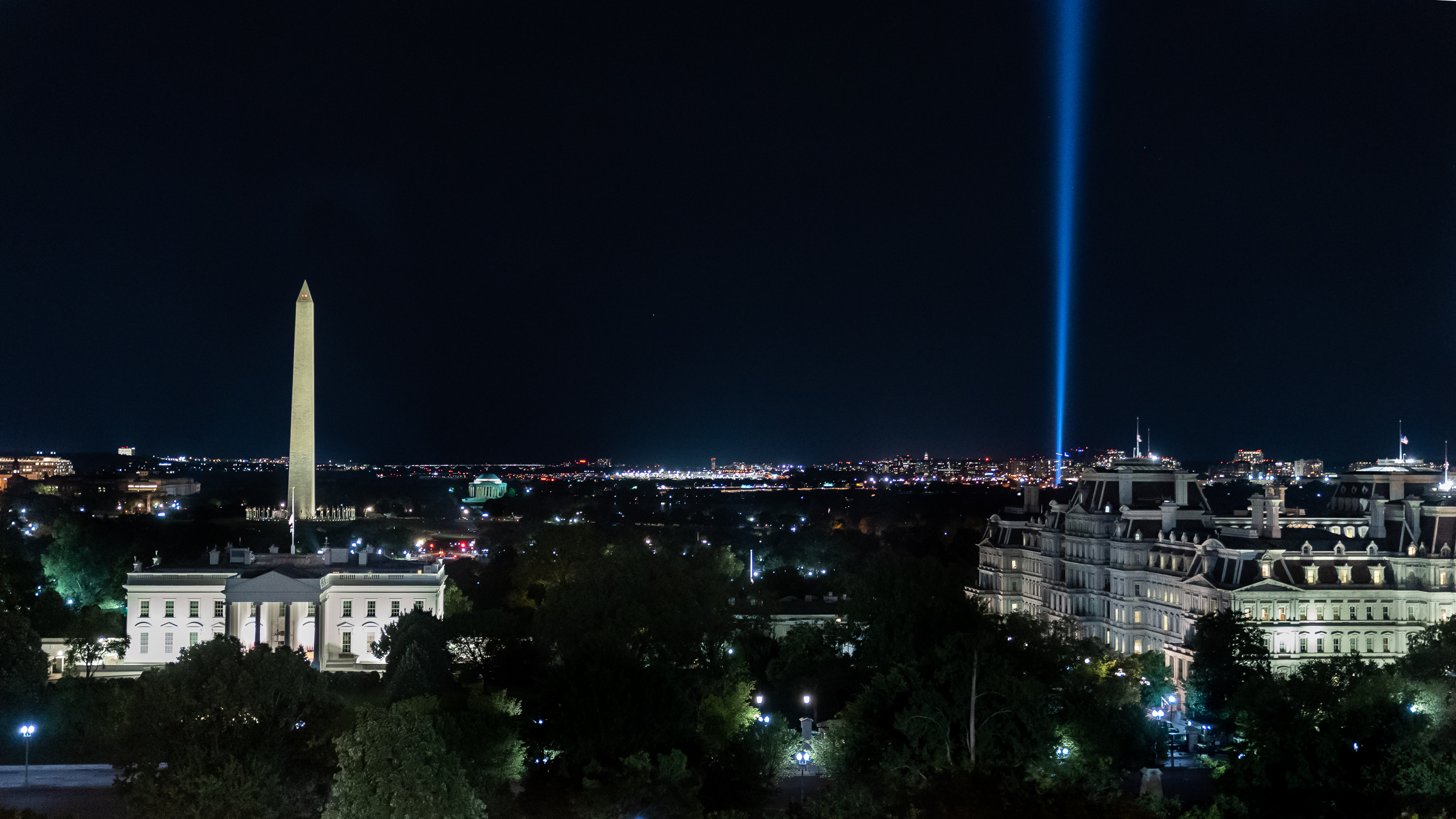
The Pentagon's Tribute in Light seen from the Lafayette Square in 2021

The Tribute in Light is an art installation in New York City created in remembrance of the September 11 attacks in 2001. It consists of 88 vertical searchlights arranged in two columns of light to represent the Twin Towers. It stands six blocks south of the World Trade Center on top of the Battery Parking Garage. Tribute in Light began as a temporary commemoration of the attacks in early 2002, but it became an annual event, currently produced on September 11 by the Municipal Art Society of New York. The Tribute in Light was conceived by artists John Bennett, Gustavo Bonevardi, Richard Nash Gould, Julian LaVerdiere, and Paul Myoda, and lighting consultant Paul Marantz.

The Tribute's illumination begins at dusk and ends at dawn, with the lights being turned off for 20-minute periods to allow migratory birds to escape as needed. On clear nights, the lights can be seen from 60 miles (97 km) away, visible in all of New York City and most of suburban Northern New Jersey and Long Island. The lights can also be seen in Fairfield County, Connecticut, as well as Westchester, Orange, and Rockland counties in New York.

The 88 xenon spotlights (44 for each tower) each consume 7,000 watts. As of 2011, the annual cost for the entire project was about $500,000.

A similar Tribute in Light has also appeared on occasion at the Pentagon in Arlington County, Virginia and at the crash site of United 93 in Shanksville, Pennsylvania, which were also targeted during the 9/11 attacks.

== Background ==
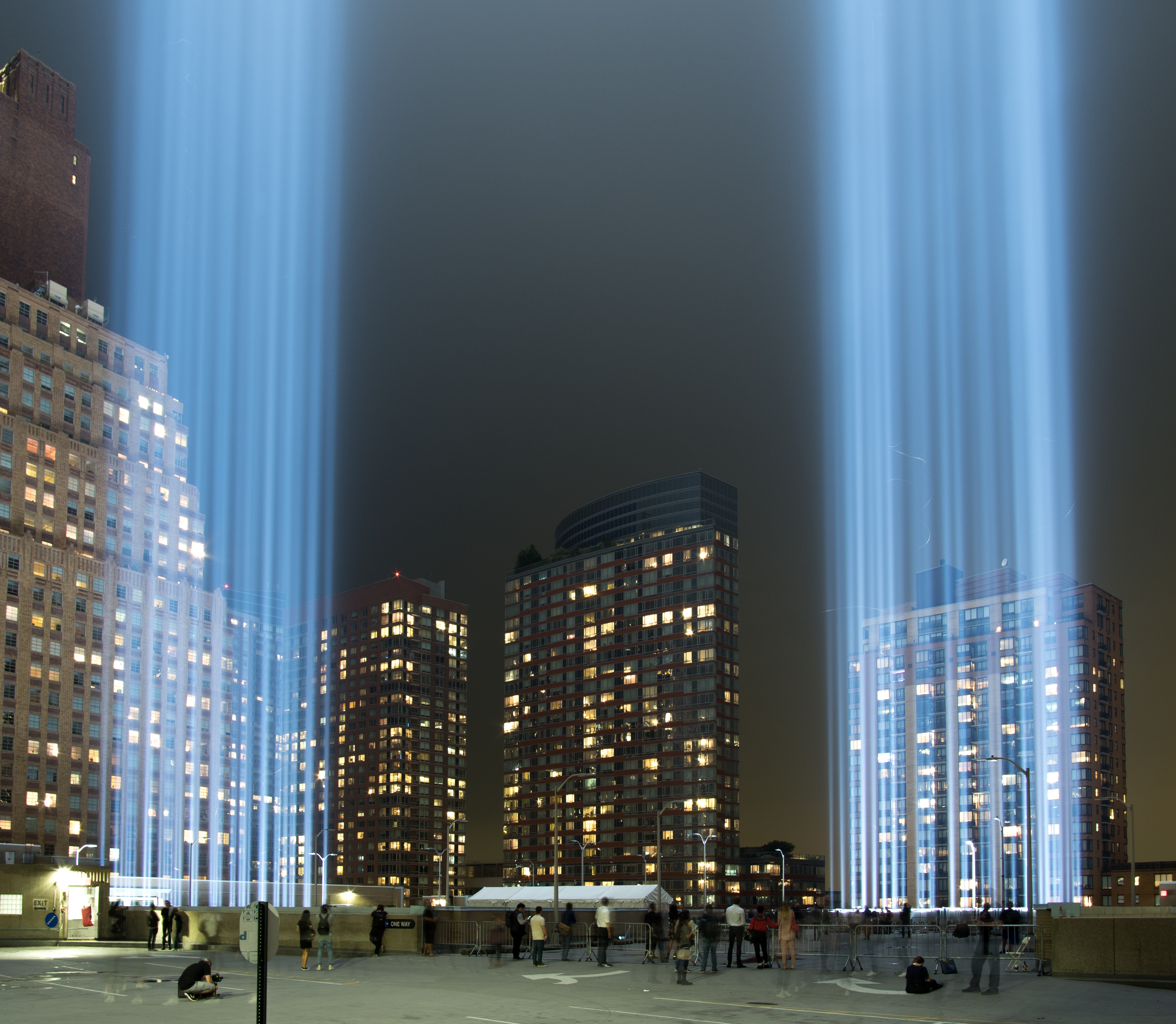
Tribute in Light as seen from atop a parking garage in Battery Park in 2018

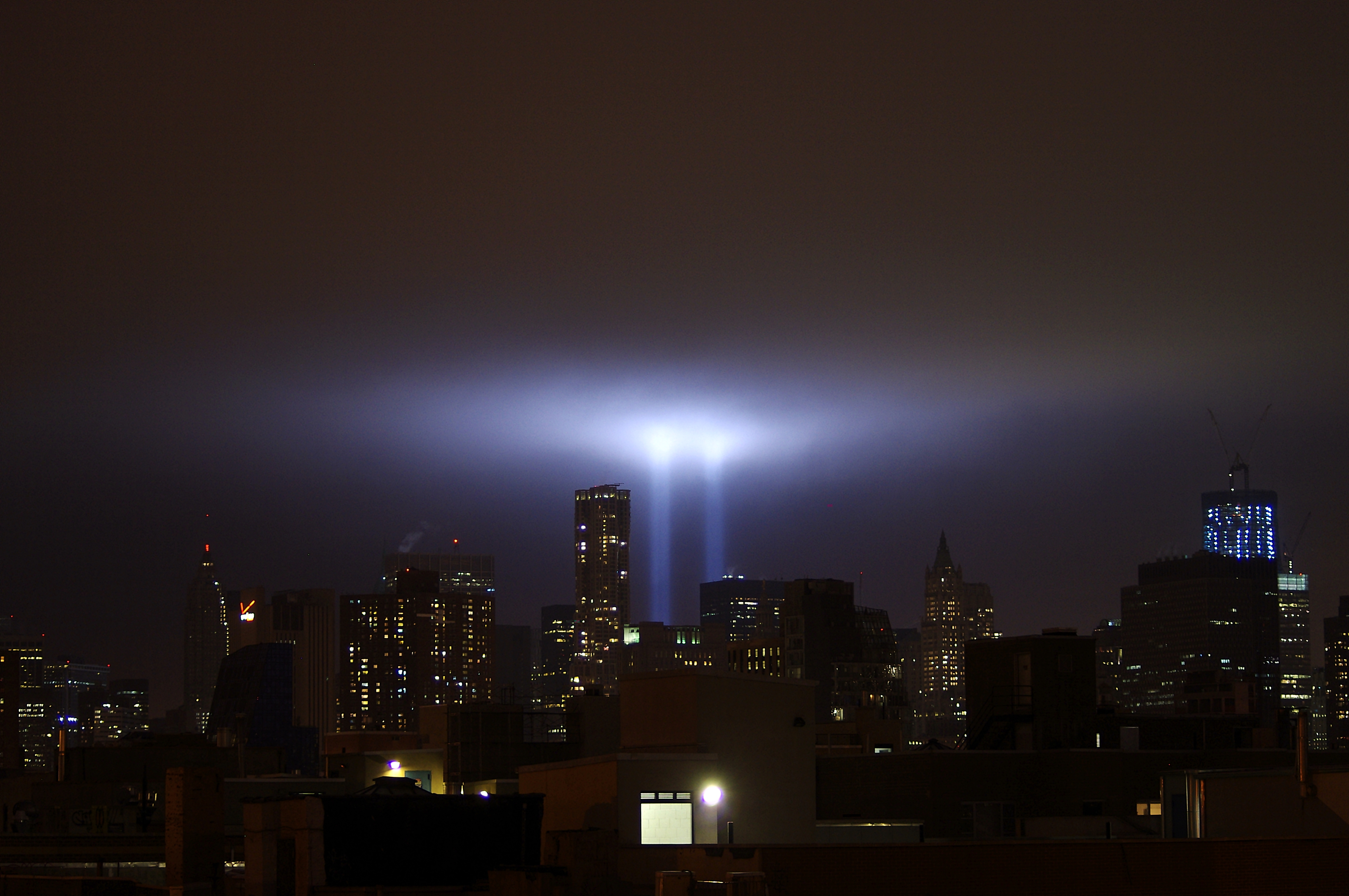
Tribute in Light as seen from the East Village in 2011

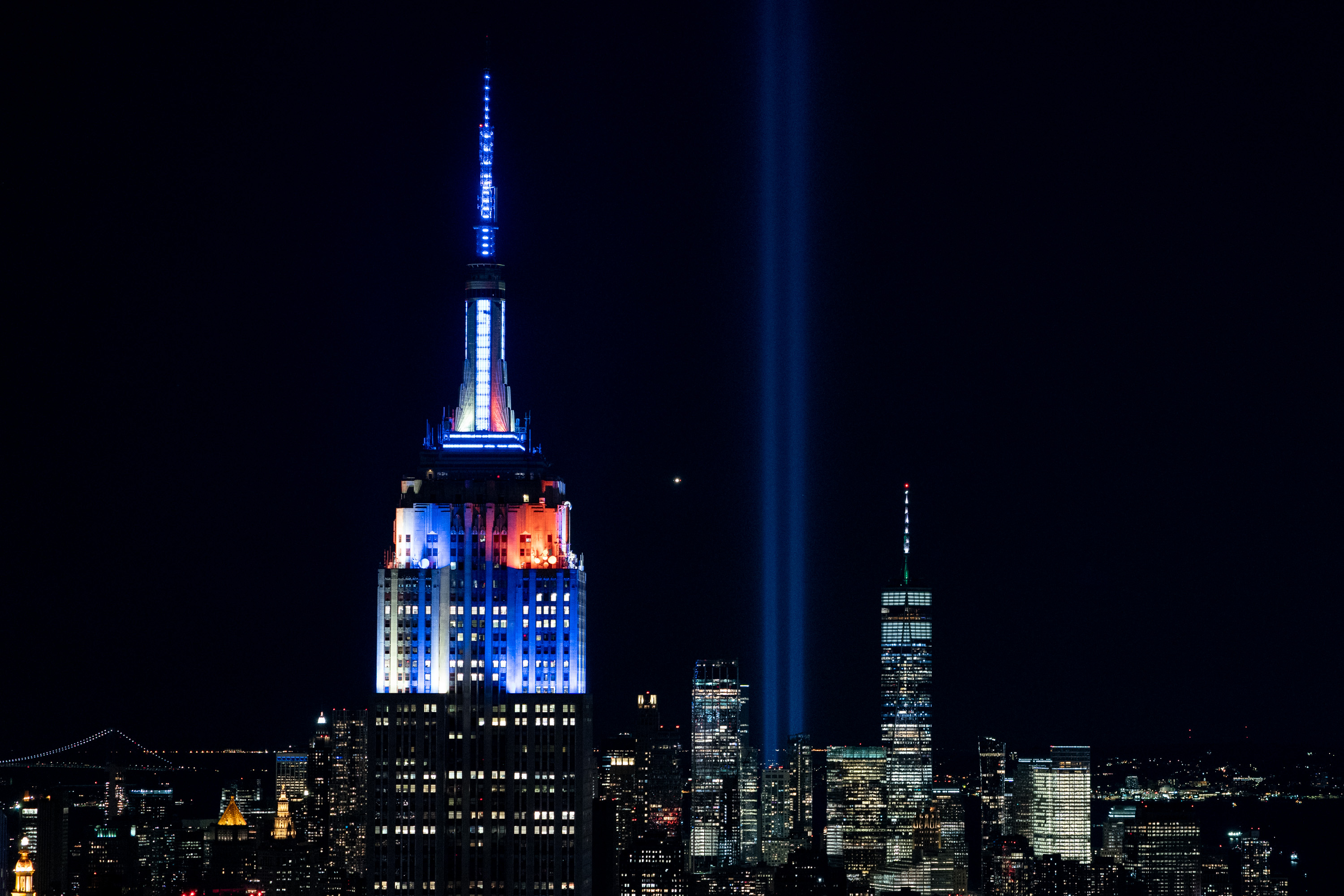
As seen from 30 Rockefeller Plaza in 2021

After the September 11 attacks, several people independently conceived the idea of using lights for remembrance. These efforts were merged under the umbrella of the Municipal Art Society and Creative Time.

Tribute in Light began construction on March 11, 2002, and initially ran as a temporary installation from March 11 to April 14, 2002, and it ran again on September 11, 2003, to mark the second anniversary of the attack. Since then, it has been repeated every year on September 11. It was originally located at a vacant lot in Battery Park City at West and Vesey Streets and later moved to the top of the Battery Parking Garage. It was announced that 2008 would be its final year, but the tribute was continued in 2009.

On December 17, 2009, it was confirmed that the tribute would continue through the tenth anniversary of the attacks in 2011. In 2012, plans were underway for the National September 11 Memorial & Museum to assume the lease for the MTA property used during this tribute, and to begin transitioning operation of the tribute from the Municipal Art Society parking garage at The Battery to the National September 11 Memorial fountains. However, the moving of the tribute has not yet occurred as of 2026.

2026 installation at Battery Parking Garage

The lights are produced by an Italian company named Space Cannon, which sends a team every year to help with the installation. A Las Vegas-based company, Light America, was also part of the team who implemented the project.

Each year, about 30 technicians, electricians, and stagehands work for about ten days to install the lights. During a testing phase of several days, observers in Brooklyn, Staten Island, New Jersey, and uptown Manhattan help make sure that the beams are adjusted accurately.

The project was originally going to be named Towers of Light, but the victims' families felt that the name emphasized the buildings destroyed instead of the people killed.

A permanent fixture of the Tribute in Light was at one point intended to be installed on the roof of One World Trade Center, but it was not included in the finished design.

Since 2008, the generators that power Tribute in Light have been fueled with biodiesel made from used cooking oil collected from local restaurants.

== Effects on birds ==
The light pollution from Tribute in Light has caused confusion for over a million migrating birds, trapping them in the beams. Even at an altitude of several miles, birds can be affected by the lights. As a result of this effect, the beams are switched off for 20-minute periods to allow the birds to escape. To ensure the lights do not affect migrating birds, the Municipal Art Society works with the NYC Bird Alliance on the illumination. A 2017 study found that the installation "dramatically altered multiple behaviors of nocturnally migrating birds—but these effects disappeared when lights were extinguished".

== In popular culture ==
Tribute in Light was featured in Boyz II Men's music video for "Color of Love". It made a notable appearance during the opening credits of Spike Lee's 2002 film 25th Hour. The tribute was also shown and referenced in the CBS series Blue Bloods. These lights were featured in the music video of U2's "You're the Best Thing About Me".

The video game adaptation of the film Spider-Man 2 features the lights at the approximate location of the WTC site, while another video game adaptation of the film The Amazing Spider-Man 2, the lights are seen on the construction site of One World Trade Center at night.

== See also ==
- Memorials and services for the September 11 attacks
  - National September 11 Memorial & Museum
  - Pentagon Memorial
  - Flight 93 National Memorial
- Other beams
  - 20th Century Fox logo (designed c. 1935) famous non-military use of searchlights.
  - Cathedral of light, a 1937 Nazi propaganda display with massed searchlights pointing skyward.
  - spectra, an installation series of light and sound artworks featuring searchlights
  - A Symphony of Lights, a contemporary light display in Hong Kong
  - Luxor Hotel and Casino skybeam since the mid-1990s, the world's brightest searchlight-style display.
  - Dale Eldred, Steeple of Light, Community Christian Church, Kansas City, MO. Completed in 1994.
  - Imagine Peace Tower – Memorial to John Lennon near Reykjavík
