= Searchlight =

Intense focused beam lamp for improving visual detection

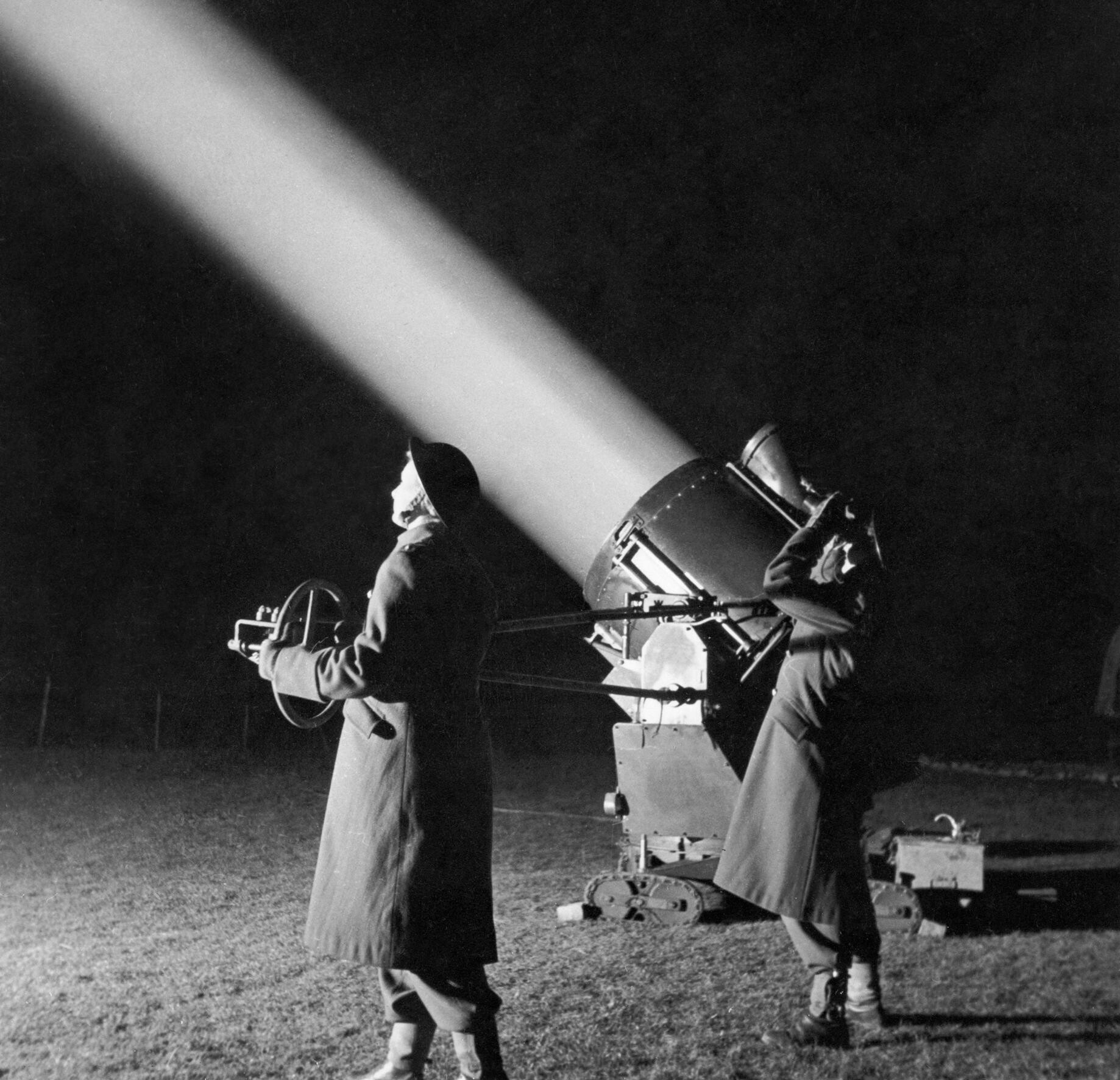
ATS officers-in-training crew a 90 cm searchlight in Western Command, 1944

A searchlight (or spotlight) is an apparatus that combines an extremely bright source (traditionally a carbon arc lamp) with a mirrored parabolic reflector to project a powerful beam of light of approximately parallel rays in a particular direction. It is usually constructed so that it can be swiveled about. The most common element used in modern searchlights is xenon (Xe). However, rare-earth elements such as lanthanum (La) and cerium (Ce) are used in phosphors to improve light quality in some specialized searchlights.

== Military use ==
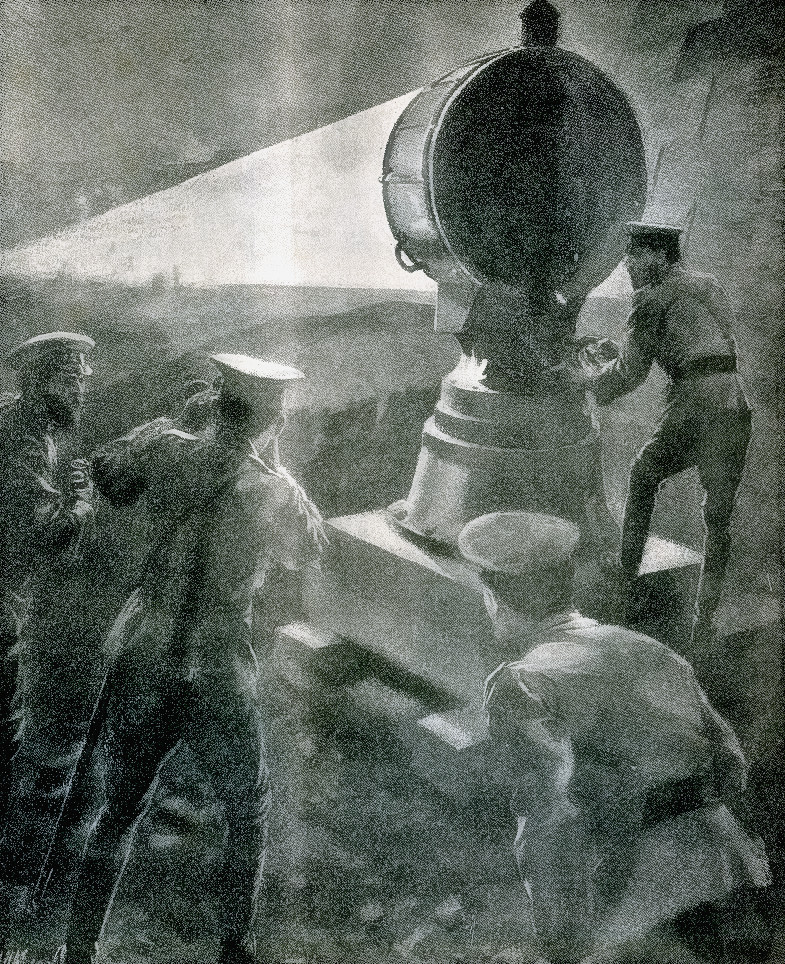
Russian troops use a searchlight against a Japanese night attack during the Russo-Japanese War, 1904

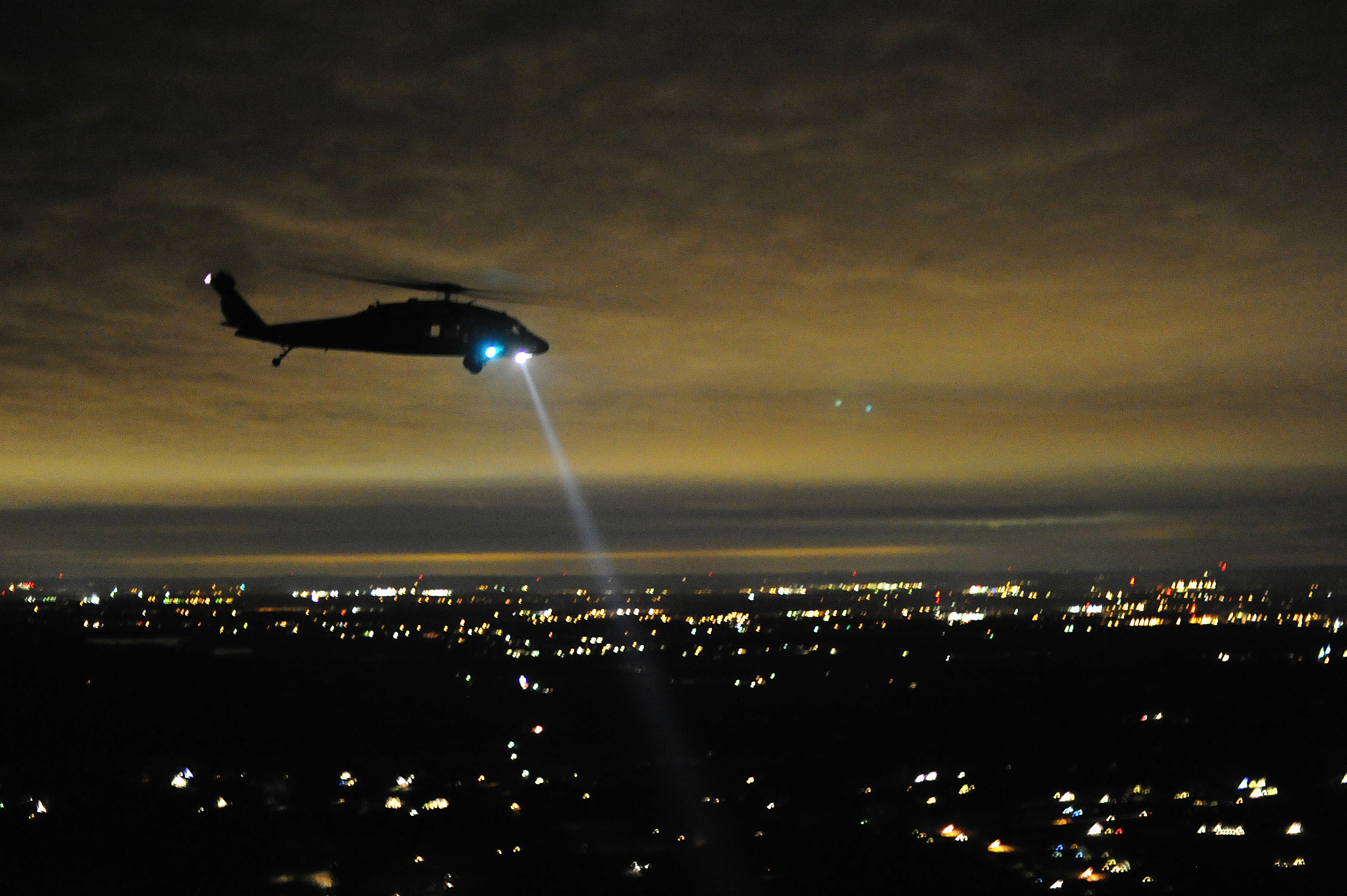
Helicopter utilizing its searchlight.

The first use of searchlights using carbon arc technology occurred during the Siege of Paris during the Franco-Prussian War. The Royal Navy used searchlights in 1882 to dazzle and prevent Egyptian forces from manning artillery batteries at Alexandria. Later that same year, the French and British forces landed troops under searchlights.

By 1907 the value of searchlights had become widely recognized. One recent use was to assist attacks by torpedo boats by dazzling gun crews on the ships being attacked. Other uses included detecting enemy ships at greater distances, as signaling devices, and to assist landing parties. Searchlights were also used by battleships and other capital vessels to locate attacking torpedo boats and were installed on many coastal artillery batteries for aiding night combat. They saw use in the Russo-Japanese War from 1904–05.

Searchlights were installed on most naval capital ships from the late 19th century through WWII, both for tracking small, close-in targets such as torpedo boats, and for engaging enemy units in nighttime gun battles. The Imperial Japanese Navy especially was known for its intensive development of nighttime naval combat tactics and extensive training. The War in the Pacific saw a number of nocturnal engagements fought by searchlight, particularly the Battle of Savo Sound at Guadalcanal. Although searchlights remained in use throughout the war, the newly developed radar proved to be a far more effective locating device, and Japanese radar development lagged far behind that of the US.

=== First World War ===
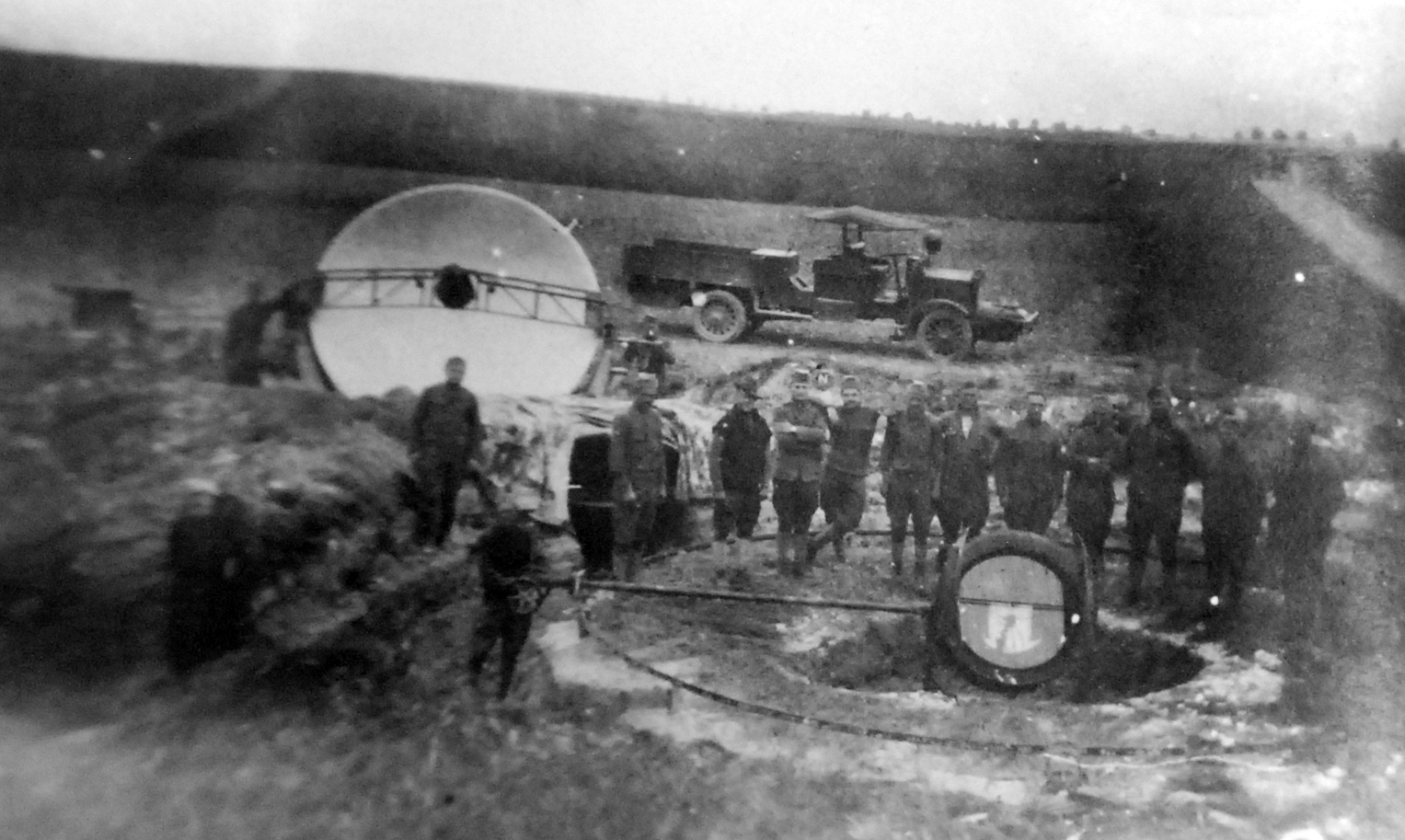
American searchlight crew and equipment in France during WWI

Searchlights were first used in the First World War to create "artificial moonlight" to enhance opportunities for night attacks by reflecting searchlight beams off the bottoms of clouds, a practice which continued in the Second World War. The term "artificial moonlight" was used to distinguish illumination provided by searchlights from that provided by natural moonlight, which was referred to as "movement light" in night-time manoeuvers. Searchlights were also heavily used in the defense of the UK against German nighttime bombing raids using Zeppelins.

=== Second World War ===
Searchlights were used extensively in defense against nighttime bomber raids during the Second World War. Controlled by sound locators and radars, searchlights could track bombers, indicating targets to anti-aircraft guns and night fighters and dazzling crews.

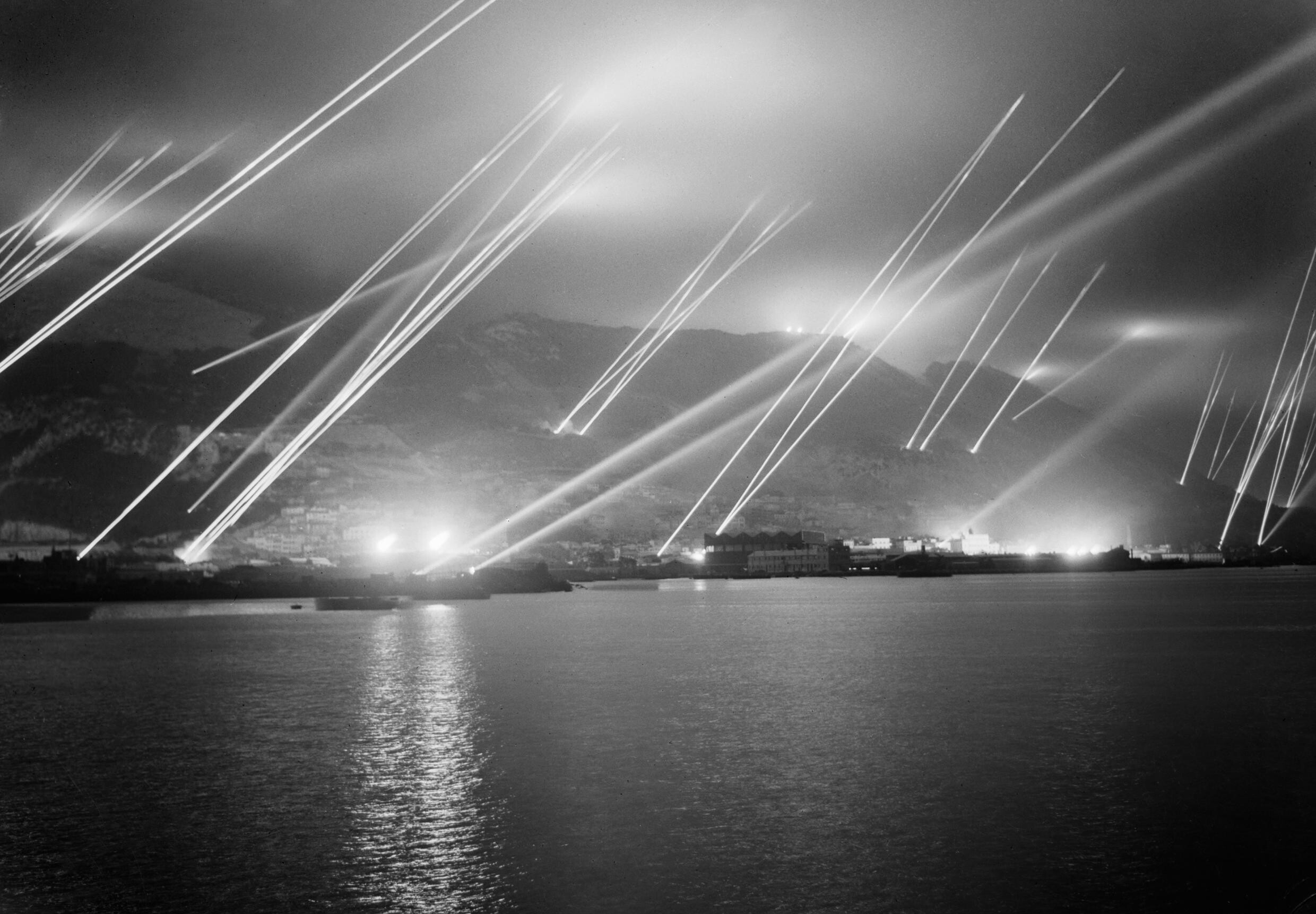
Searchlights pierce the night sky during an air-raid practice on Gibraltar, 1942

Searchlights were occasionally used tactically in ground battles. One notable occasion was the Red Army use of searchlights during the Battle of the Seelow Heights in April 1945. 143 searchlights were directed at the German defence force, with the aim of temporarily blinding them during a Soviet offensive, begun with the largest artillery bombardment the world had ever seen until that point. However, the morning fog diffused the light and silhouetted the attacking Soviet forces, making them clearly visible to the Germans. The Soviets suffered heavy losses as a result and were forced to delay their invasion of the city.

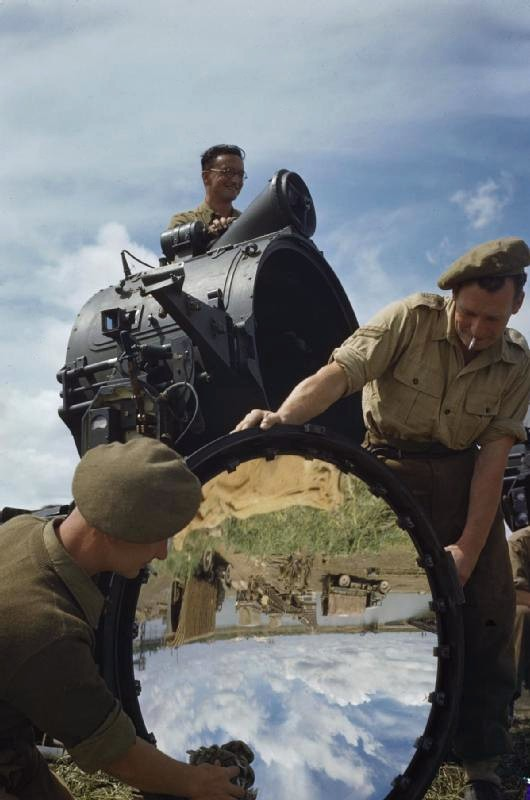
Members of a Royal Artillery, anti-aircraft searchlight detachment clean the mirror of their searchlight, Italy, April 1945

Second World War-era searchlights include models manufactured by General Electric and by the Sperry Company. These were mostly of 60 inch (152.4 cm) diameter with rhodium-plated parabolic mirror, reflecting a carbon arc discharge. Peak output was 800000000 candela. It was powered by a 15 kW generator and had an effective beam visibility of 28 to 35 miles (45 to 56 km) in clear low humidity.

The searchlight also found a niche for use by night fighters and anti-submarine warfare aircraft. The Turbinlite was a powerful searchlight mounted in the nose of an RAF Douglas Boston light bomber, converted into a night fighter to shoot down Luftwaffe night bombers. The aircraft would be directed in the general direction of the enemy by ground-based or metre-wave airborne radar, and the pilot would then switch on the Turbinlite, illuminating the enemy aircraft, which would then be shot down by accompanying RAF day fighters such as the Hawker Hurricane. This never proved very successful, as the light made the emitting aircraft a very big target for rear gunners, who would simply have to shoot into the light and be guaranteed to hit something eventually.

During the Battle of the North Atlantic, RAF aircraft such as the Vickers Wellington were assigned to patrol for surfaced German U-boats at night, when they would be on the surface, charging their batteries. A large searchlight called a Leigh light was suspended from the bottom of the wing or fuselage, and would be used to illuminate the surfaced U-boat while it was being attacked with bombs and depth charges. The Leigh light was somewhat more successful than the Turbinlite, but in both cases the development of centimeter-wave radar proved to be the far more effective answer.

=== War in Ukraine ===
During the 2022 Russian invasion of Ukraine, both the Russian Armed Forces and Territorial Defence Forces (Ukraine) have extensively used spotlights for both Civil defense purposes, as well as frontline anti-drone and anti-aircraft warfare.

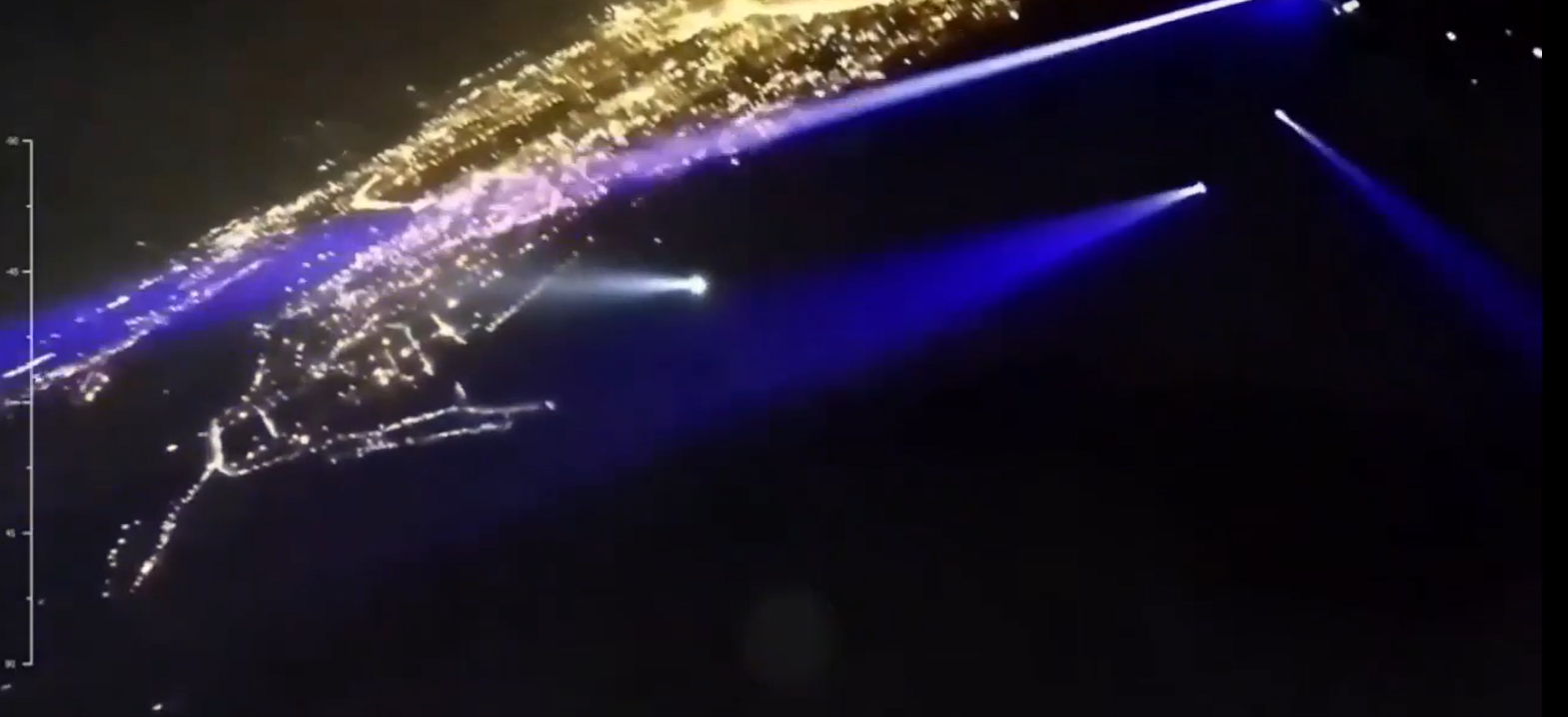
Spotlights captured from a camera mounted to a "Geranium-2" loitering munition over Kropyvnytskyi, January 5th 2025

== Non-military use ==
Today, searchlights are used in advertising, fairs, festivals, and other public events. Their use was once common for movie premieres; the waving searchlight beams can still be seen as a design element in the logos of 20th Century Studios and the Fox television network. The world's most powerful searchlight today beams from the top of the pyramid-shaped Luxor Hotel in Las Vegas. It concentrates about 13650000 lumens from 39 7 kW xenon lamps into a beam of about 9129000000 candela.

Tribute in Light is an art installation that uses two columns of searchlights to represent the former Twin Towers of the World Trade Center, in remembrance of the September 11 attacks. It is produced annually in Lower Manhattan.

Disney parks use searchlights in their nighttime fireworks displays. They are installed on top of the rooftops of several attractions in Fantasyland.

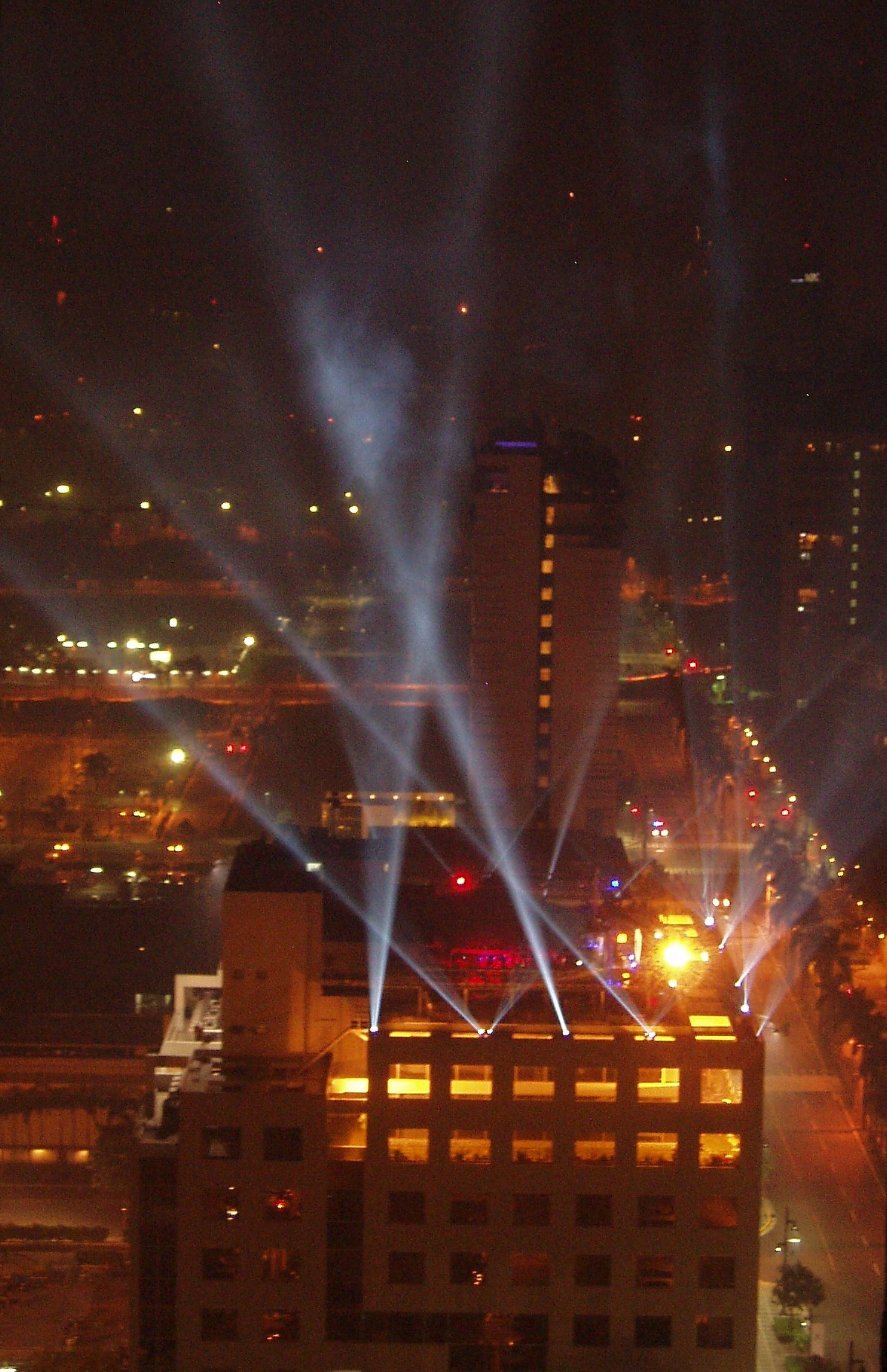
Searchlights at New Year's Eve 2012 in Bonifacio Global City, Philippines

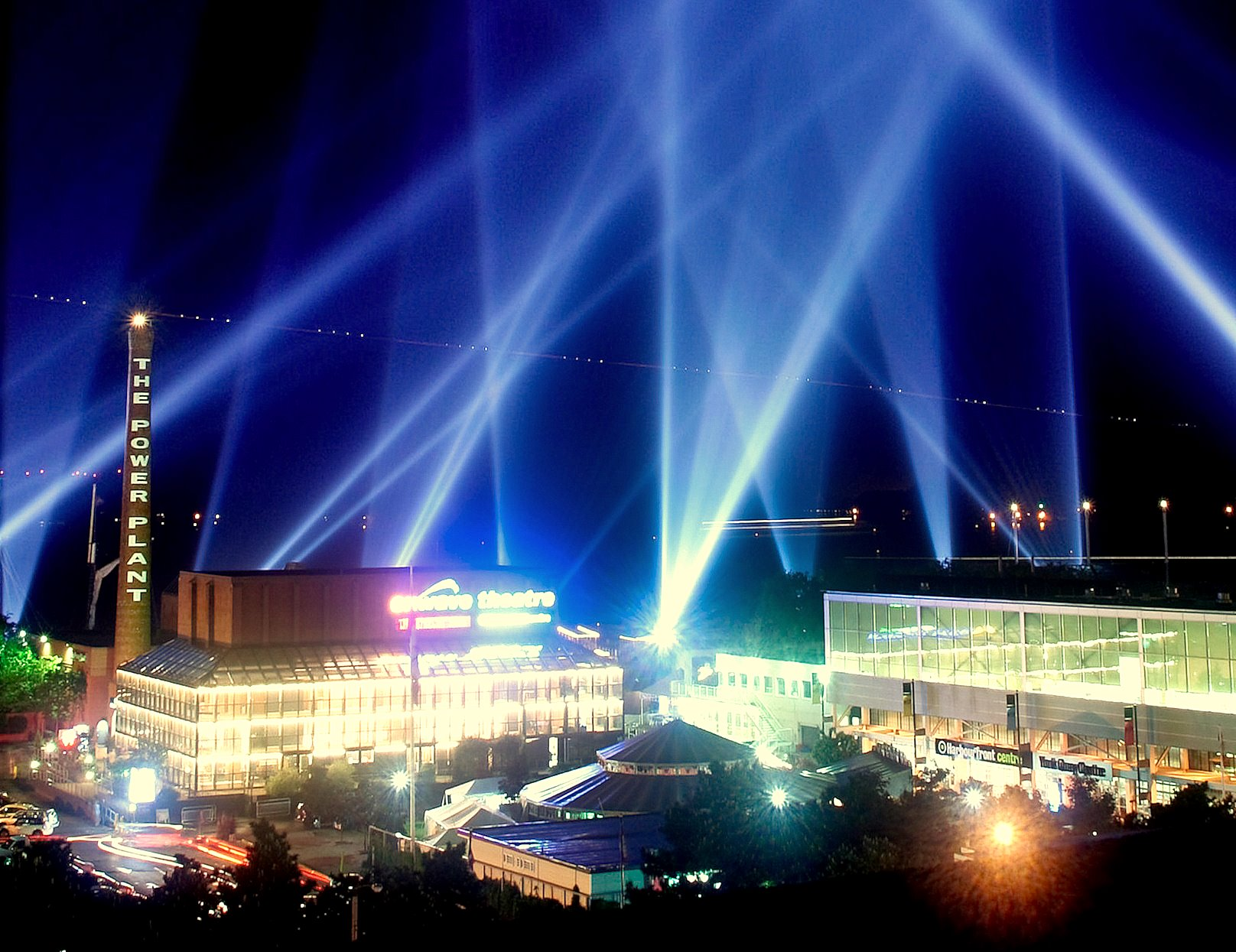
Use of searchlights at the Luminato arts festival in Toronto

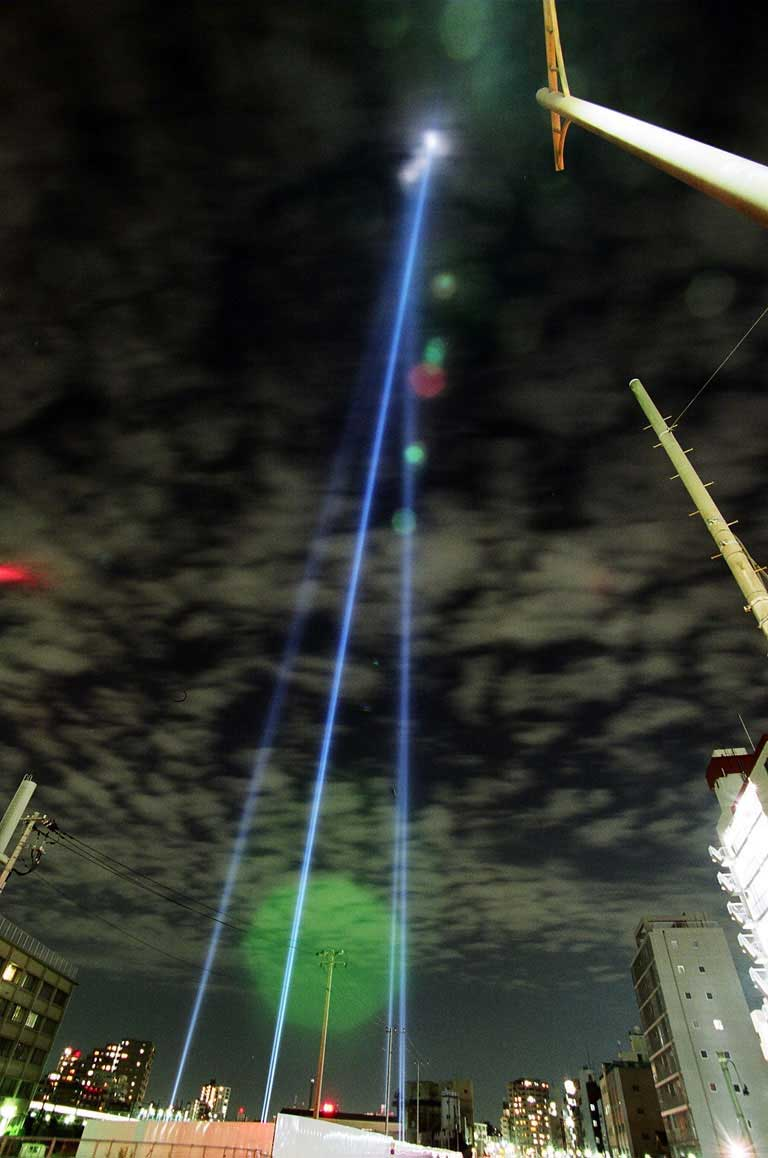
Searchlights demonstrating the height of Tokyo Skytree before its construction in 2007

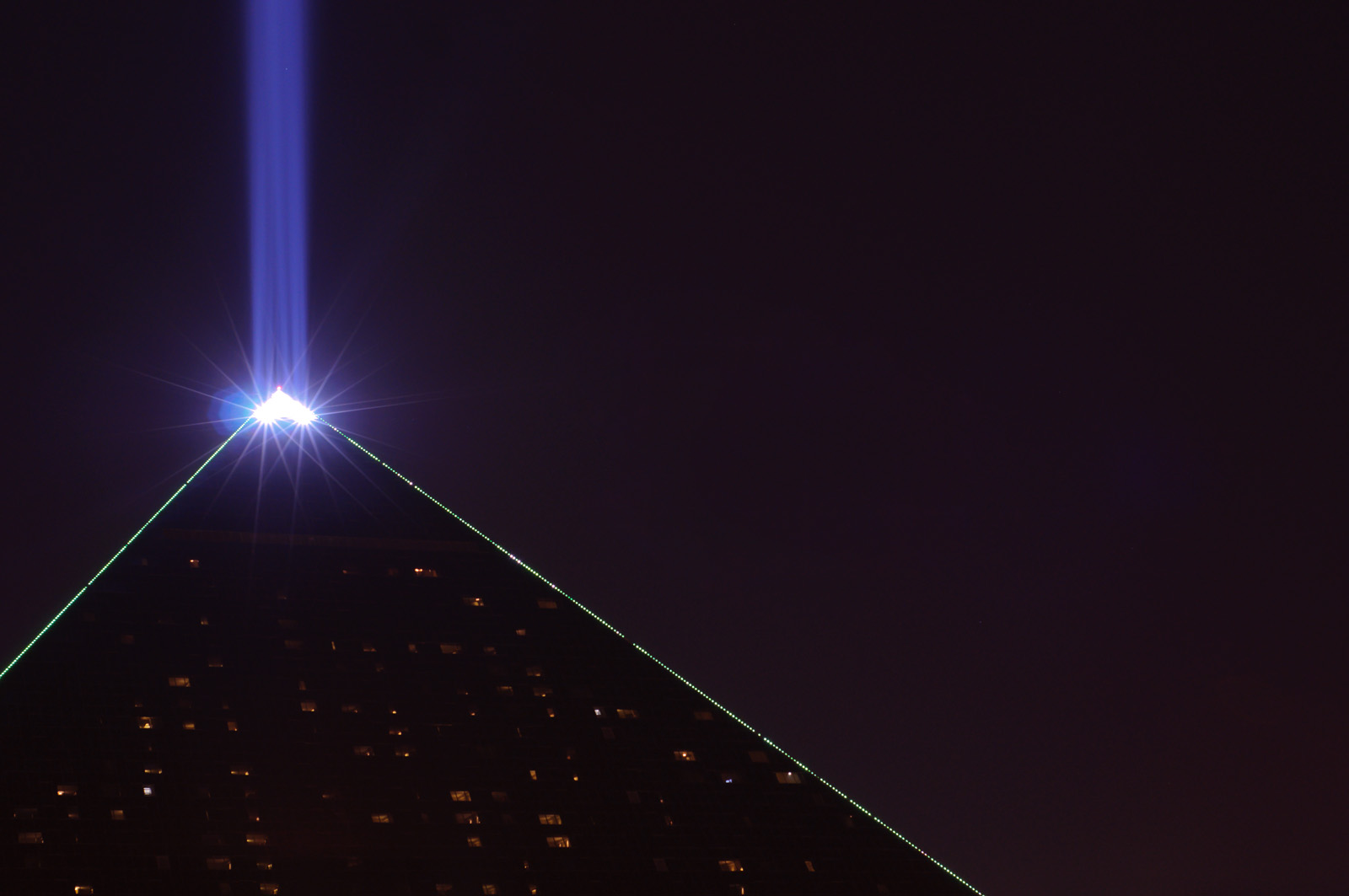
Luxor Sky Beam

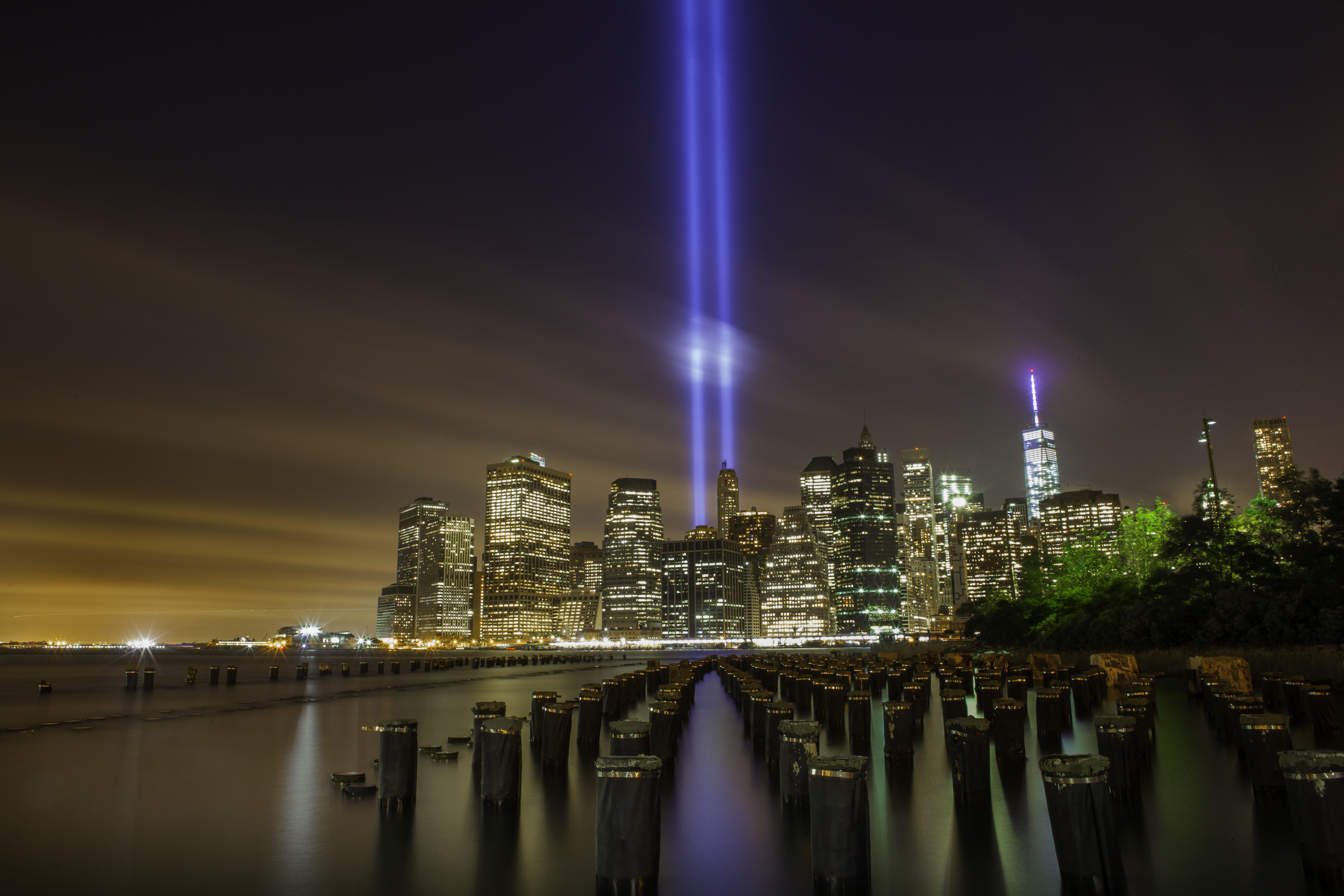
Tribute in Light, representing the World Trade Center twin towers in remembrance of the September 11 attacks

Animated searchlights are a part of the distinctive production logo used at the start of 20th Century Fox films since the 1930s

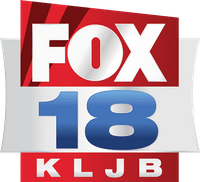
A logo for Fox affiliate KLJB, one of many examples of a Fox station still using searchlights in their logo.

== See also ==
- Mangin mirror
- Cathedral of light
- Tribute in Light
- Military applications of searchlight
  - Canal Defence Light
  - Turbinlite
  - Leigh light
  - G-numbers
  - German searchlights of World War II
