= Kathleen James-Chakraborty =

American architect

- Education: University of Pennsylvania; Yale University
- Employer(s): University of Minnesota; University of California, Berkeley; Technical University of Dortmund; University College Dublin

Kathleen James-Chakraborty is a professor of art history and architectural historian at University College Dublin. She is an expert in American and German modernism, and is interested in modern sacred architecture. In 2018 She was awarded the Royal Irish Academy Gold Medal for Humanities.

== Early life and education ==
James-Chakraborty grew up in Chestertown on the Eastern Shore region of Maryland. In 1966 she attended Chestertown Elementary, where she was in the first year of desegregation. She spent three semester at a boarding school in New England, where she spent time in a library designed by Louis Kahn. She remained friends with her elementary school teacher, Mrs Wilson, until her death at the age of ninety-one. She earned her bachelor's degree at Yale University in 1982. She earned an MA and PhD at the University of Pennsylvania in 1990. She moved to the University of Minnesota School of Architecture as an assistant professor.

== Research and career ==
She served as the Gambrinus Fellow at the Technical University of Dortmund. She became an assistant professor of architecture at University of California, Berkeley in 1992, a tenured associate professor in 1997, and a full professor in 2006. James-Chakraborty was appointed professor of art history at University College Dublin in 2007. She was head of the School of Art History from 2007 to 2010. She spent the fall semester in 2015 and 2016 at Yale School of Architecture.

Her work considers modern art, modernism and nationalism. She has extended the received perspectives of German modernism. James-Chakraborty has investigated the role of women in architecture and design. She also studied the Ruhrgebiet and recent German architecture. In 2016 she arranged the European Architectural History Network, which was held in Dublin Castle. Her 2017 book Architecture since 1400 was a global survey of architecture, described by Murray Fraser as a "scintillating overview".

While others have characterized contemporary Berlin’s museums and memorials as postmodern, Kathleen James-Chakraborty argues that these environments are examples of an “architecture of modern memory” that is much older, more complex, and historically contingent. She reveals that churches and museums repaired and designed before 1989 in Düren, Hanover, Munich, Neviges, Pforzheim, Stuttgart, and Weil am Rhein contributed to a modernist precedent for the relationship between German identity and the past developed since then in the Ruhr region and in Berlin.

She helped organise the 2019 National Gallery of Ireland conference Bauhaus Effects. She served from 2016-2021 on the board of the National Museum of Ireland.

Professor James-Chakraborty has criticised Ireland's obsession with university rankings, particularly QS rankings and the way in which this skews the allocation of resources.

=== Awards and honours ===
- 2011 Elected to the Royal Irish Academy
- 2018 Royal Irish Academy Gold Medal for Humanities

== Bibliography ==
=== Books ===
- James, Kathleen (1997). Erich Mendelsohn and the architecture of German Modernism. Cambridge: Cambridge UP.
- James-Chakraborty, Kathleen (2002). German Architecture for a Mass Audience.
- — (2006). Bauhaus Culture: From Weimar to the Cold War. University of Minnesota Press.
- — (2014). Architecture since 1400. University of Minnesota Press.
- —, ed. (2017). India in Art in Ireland. Routledge.
- — (2018). Modernism as memory : building identity in the Federal Republic of Germany. University of Minnesota Press.

=== Articles and other contributions ===
- James-Chakraborty, Kathleen (2005). "Proportions and politics : marketing Mies and Mendelsohn" (PDF). Bulletin of the German Historical Institute. Supplement 2: 51–64.

=== Critical studies and reviews of James-Chakraborty's work ===
Erich Mendelsohn and the architecture of German Modernism

- Jefferies, Matthew (1998). "Erich Mendelsohn and the Architecture of German Modernism". Journal of Design History. 11 (2): 186–187.
