= Hans Weidemann =

Nazi propagandist (1904–1975)

- Born: 1904; Essen
- Died: 1975 (aged 70–71)
- Occupations: Artist, photographer and film director
- Known for: Festliches Nürnberg

Hans Weidemann (1904–1975) was a German artist, photographer and film director.

Weidemann joined the Nazi party in 1927.

Weidemann directed Festliches Nürnberg (English: Festive Nuremberg), a short 1937 propaganda film chronicling the Nazi Party rallies in Nuremberg in 1936 and 1937.

Weidemann co-wrote and produced Attack on Baku (German: Anschlag auf Baku), a 1942 German thriller film directed by Fritz Kirchhoff.
