= German searchlights of World War II =

Use of searchlights during World War II

German searchlights of the Second World War were used to detect and track enemy aircraft at night. They were used in three main sizes, 60, 150 and 200 centimetres. After the end of the First World War, German development of searchlights was effectively stopped by the Treaty of Versailles. It resumed in 1927. At the outset of the war, searchlights were combined with acoustic direction-finders, with the direction-finders guiding the searchlights to the right part of the sky, where they swept until they found the target. Later in the war, the searchlights were radar-directed. The searchlights used extremely high-powered carbon arc lamps.

== 60 Centimetre ==
German 60 cm searchlight

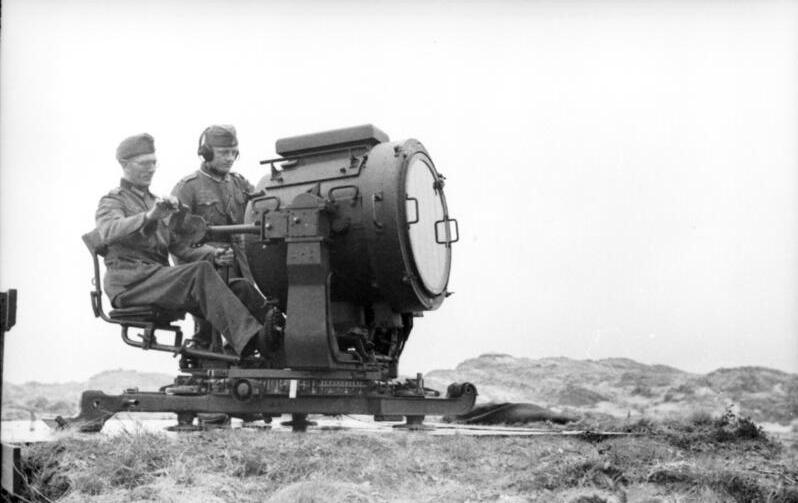
A searchlight deployed at a coastal battery, 1943

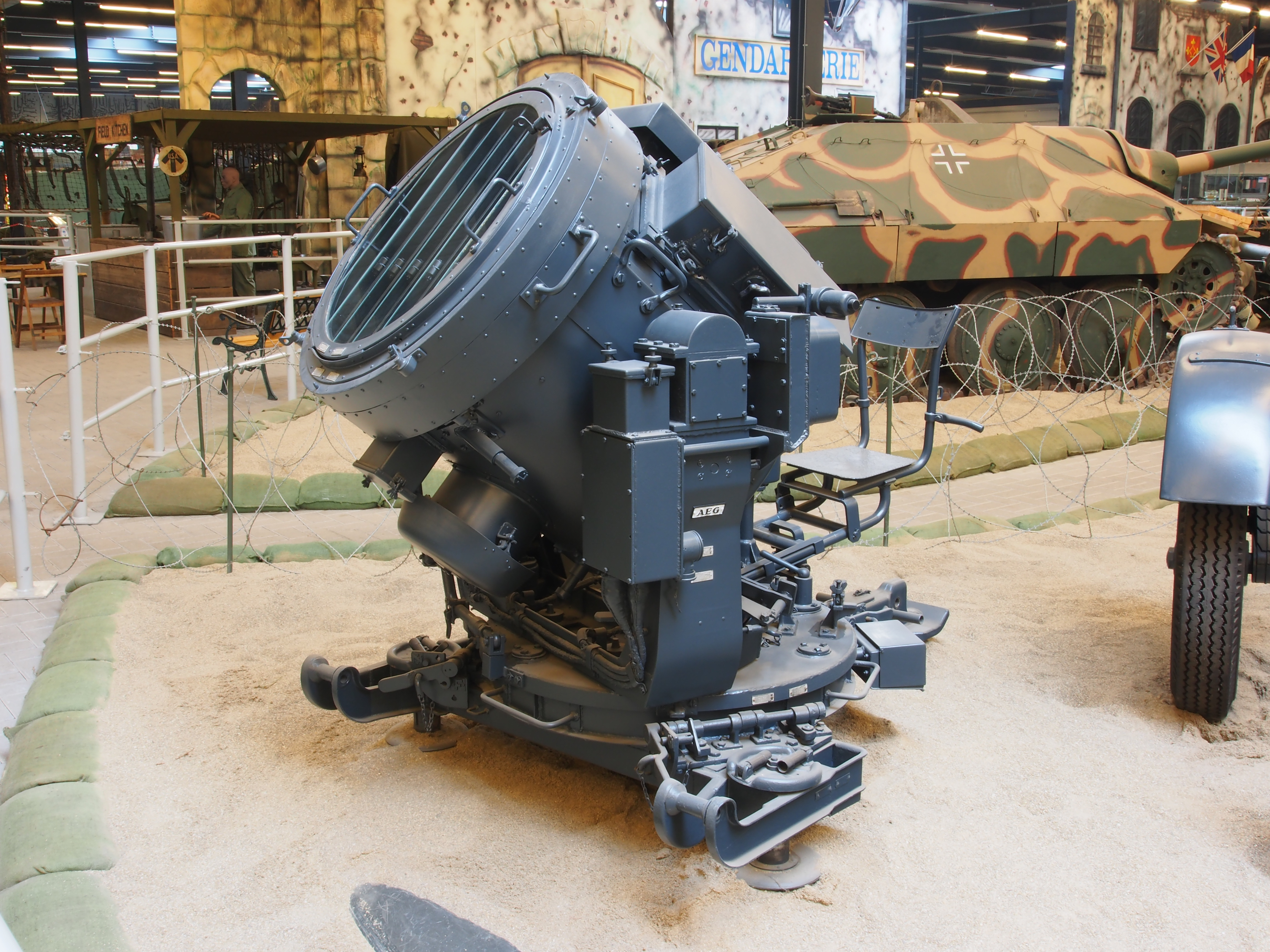
A searchlight displayed at the Overloon War Museum in the Netherlands, 2012

These were developed in the late 1930s, with a 60 centimetres (24 in) diameter parabolic glass reflector and was powered by an 8 kilowatt generator. The lamp output was rated at 135 million candelas, and it had a detection range of about 5 kilometres (3.1 mi) for targets travelling at an altitude of 1,500 metres (4,900 ft). With the beam dispersed, this reduced to about 3.2 kilometres (2.0 mi). It required a crew of three and could be transported using a single axle Special trailer 51. One of the crew operated the searchlight, another operated the generator, and the third was the section commander. Naval versions of the searchlight included a shutter, to allow them to be used for Morse signaling.

The searchlight was controlled in azimuth and altitude by two, hand-operated cranks. The searchlight operator also had a foot-switch that operated a lamp on the generator. He could use this to send simple Morse signals to the generator operator, requesting, for example, more or less power. The searchlight included a sophisticated system to control the carbon arc lamp, extending the carbon electrodes to keep a constant arc distance as the ends of the electrodes burned away.

The 8 kilowatt, direct current generator that powered the searchlight was driven by a six-cylinder, BMW engine, of a type used in pre-war cars.

Typical tactics were to sweep the search light in an S-shaped pattern along the targets' expected course with the beam dispersed, once the target was detected, it was then tracked using the focused beam.

The 60 cm searchlights were not powerful enough to reach the allied bomber streams later in the war, so they were typically employed organically with 20 mm and 37 mm low-level flak guns.

== 150 Centimetre ==
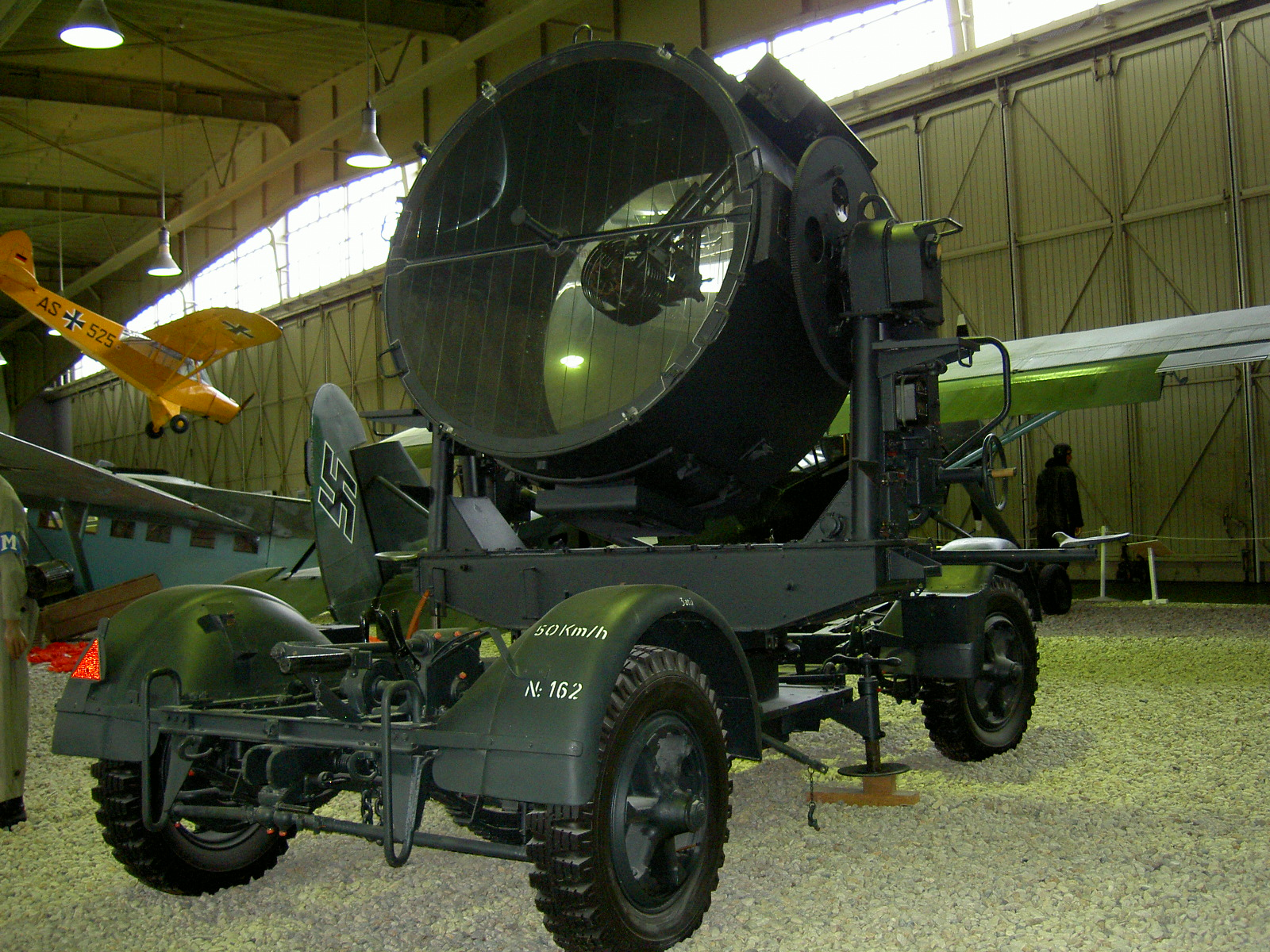
A 150cm Flakscheinwerfer 34 searchlight displayed at the Militärhistorisches Museum Flugplatz Berlin-Gatow, 2003

Developed in the late 1930s, the Flakscheinwerfer (Flak Searchlight) 34 and 37 used 150-centimetre (59 in) diameter parabolic glass reflectors with an output of 990 million candelas. The system was powered by a 24-kilowatt generator, based around a 51-horsepower (38 kW) 8-cylinder engine, giving a current of 200 amperes at 110 volts. The searchlight was attached to the generator by a 200-metre (660 ft) cable. The system had a detection range of about 8 kilometres (5.0 mi) for targets at an altitude of between 4,000 and 5,000 metres (13,000 and 16,000 ft). The system could be made mobile using two sets of Special Trailer 104 units, one for the searchlight and one for the generator. It required a crew of seven to operate it.

The searchlight could be traversed 360 degrees and elevated from -12 degrees through the vertical to -12 degrees on the other side.

Early war tactics for the searchlight deployment had the searchlights forward of the Flak guns in a "zone of preparation", laid out in a grid with 5 kilometers between each light. Sound locators deployed with the searchlights helped them find targets, later these were replaced with radar systems.

Sixty-one special fixed quadruple 150-centimetre mounts were produced in an effort to extend the range of the 150 centimetre searchlights, however these proved unsuccessful.

== 200 Centimetre ==
In order to reach bombers now flying at increasingly higher altitudes, more powerful searchlights were needed. In 1943, the first 200-centimetre Scheinwerfer-43 searchlights, with 2.7 billion Hefner candlepower (2.4 gigacandela) were delivered to troops. Powered by a 120-kilowatt generator, these searchlights could detect targets at distances of up to 13 kilometres (8.1 mi).

Typically, one 200 cm searchlight was employed with three 150 cm searchlights. The 200 cm searchlight was deployed at the center of a triangle formed by the 150 cm searchlights. The smaller searchlights deployed at a distance of about 2.5 kilometres (1.6 mi) from the larger central "master" searchlight. The master searchlight would find the target, and the 150 cm lights would cone the target, providing solid triangulation.

== Obsolete and captured searchlights ==
A few obsolete 110 centimetre searchlights and captured French 200 cm and 240 cm searchlights were also used.

== German searchlight inventory ==
In September 1940, excluding units emplaced at naval facilities, Germany had 2,540 searchlights (60 cm and 150 cm). During the war, this number grew rapidly — by February 1944, the Quartermaster General of the Luftwaffe General Staff reported that stocks of floodlights were as follows:

| Type | Mobile | Fixed | Total |
|---|---|---|---|
| 60 cm Flak floodlight | 5582 | 794 | 6376 |
| 150 cm Flak floodlight | 5675 | 1636 | 7311 |
| 150 cm quadruple Flak floodlight | - | 61 | 61 |
| 200 cm Flak floodlight | - | - | 2262 |
| Total | 11257 | 2491 | 13748 |

== See also ==
- Cathedral of Light – Feature of the Nazi Party rallies in Nuremberg
