= Ufa-Palast am Zoo =

Former cinema in Charlottenburg, Berlin, Germany

Coordinates: 52°30′22″N 13°20′03″E

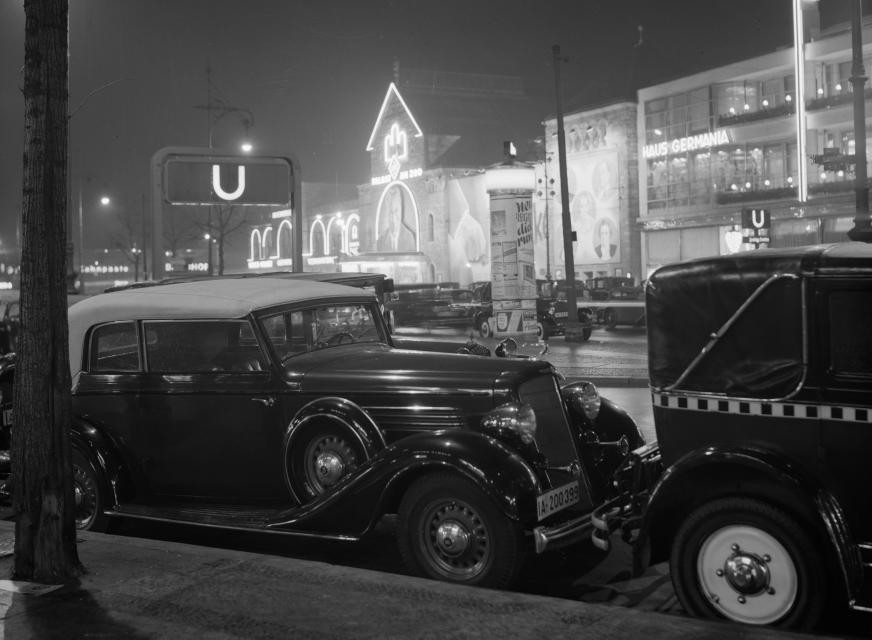
Ufa-Palast, c. 1935

The Ufa-Palast am Zoo, located near Berlin Zoological Garden in the New West area of Charlottenburg, was a major Berlin cinema owned by Universum Film AG, or Ufa. Opened in 1919 and enlarged in 1925, it was the largest cinema in Germany until 1929 and was one of the main locations of film premières in the country. The building was destroyed in November 1943 during the Bombing of Berlin in World War II and replaced in 1957 by the Zoo Palast. The Neo-Romanesque building was originally designed as an exhibition hall by architect Carl Gause, with construction taking place from 1905 to 1906.

== History ==
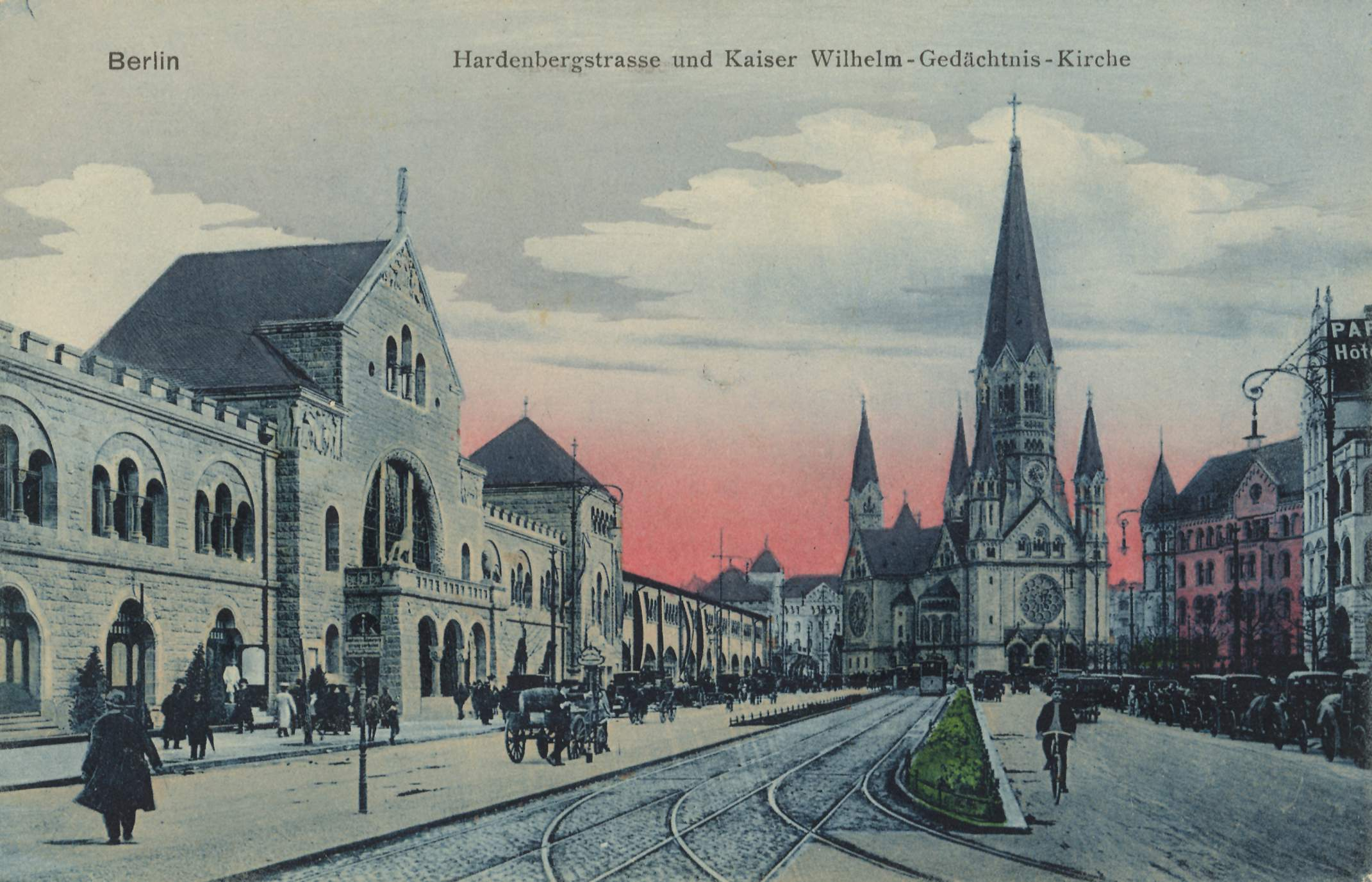
Ausstellungshallen am Zoo (left) and Kaiser Wilhelm Memorial Church, c. 1910 postcard

The Neo-Romanesque building at Hardenbergstraße was designed as an exhibition hall by architect Carl Gause (1851–1907), an alumnus of the Bauakademie who had also drawn plans for the Hotel Adlon. Like the Romanisches Haus nearby, the design followed the model of the Kaiser Wilhelm Memorial Church at Auguste-Viktoria-Platz (present-day Breitscheidplatz), built in 1891–1895 according to plans by Franz Schwechten. The development of a "Romanesque forum" met the demands of Emperor Wilhelm II who even set guidelines for the design of streetlights and tram power lines. Construction work took place from 1905 to 1906; the building complex initially hosted the Ausstellungshallen am Zoologischen Garten exhibition halls, named after the adjacent Berlin Zoo.

In 1912, Arthur Biberfeld converted the western hall into a theatre. In 1913–15, projection facilities were installed by Oskar Kaufmann for the première of the film Quo Vadis, produced by the Italian Cines company, and from 1913 to 1914, the theatre was called the Cines-Palast. The other section of the building housed a café and variety theatre called the Wilhelmshallen.

In 1919, architect Max Bischoff rebuilt it for Ufa as a 1,740-seat cinema, which opened on 18 September 1919 with the première of Ernst Lubitsch's Madame Dubarry. The cinema had a rectangular auditorium with two levels of proscenium boxes and the remaining seating arranged in horseshoe-shaped rows. Siegfried Kracauer praised the sightlines from the amphitheatre-style seating and the "discreet" and "tasteful" colour scheme; the décor was simple, with faïence panels around the screen.

In 1925, the cinema was again rebuilt by Carl Stahl-Urach; it was enlarged to 2,165 seats by the addition of a balcony, the lighting was improved, and an illuminated cinema organ was added. The interior décor by Samuel Rachman resembled that of Broadway cinemas. It was the largest cinema in Germany until the 1929 opening of the Ufa-Palast in Hamburg, which then became the largest in Europe.

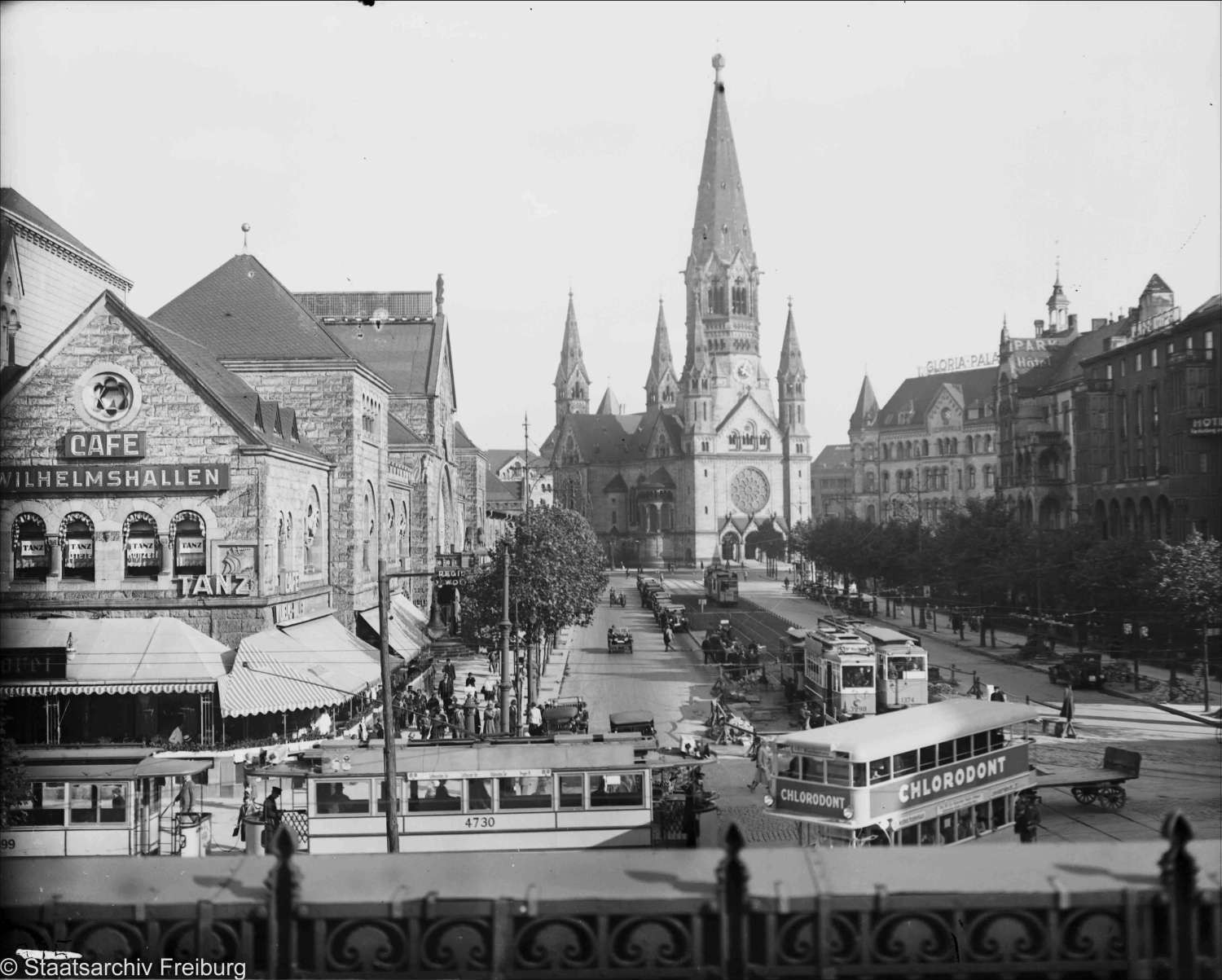
Ufa-Palast, Memorial Church and Gloria-Palast, view from Zoo station, August 1926

The reopening on 25 September 1925 was overseen by Ernö Rapée, a former employee of the American cinema impresario "Roxy" Rothafel who was brought over by Ufa together with Alexander Oumansky, who had been ballet director at Roxy's Capitol Theatre, to introduce US-style cinema shows to Germany. They were given an 85-member orchestra plus a jazz band, and Roxy himself came to offer assistance. The New York Times reported that the American "combination of symphony concert, ballet and film" had been successfully imported to Germany for the first time. Rapee stayed on for almost a year as manager and as Ufa's senior music director, in which role he arranged music to accompany several films; he left after supervising the opening of Ufa's new Gloria-Palast across the square. Berlin's own Capitol cinema, designed by Hans Poelzig, also opened in 1925 as a nearby competitor to the Ufa-Palast; by 1928, when Joseph Goebbels made a speech denouncing the entertainment and other business venues there, Berlin's premier cinemas were clustered close together around the Kaiser Wilhelm Memorial Church and some had deliberately sought to make it the "Broadway of Europe".

Following the renovation, the exterior was used for advertising, designed by Ufa's scenic designer Rudi Feld. This began with light displays and large posters and progressed to complete transformations of the appearance of the building. For example, for Spione in 1928, a gigantic stylised eye stared out of the centre of the façade and the letters of the title, written across the whole width of the central bay, became pupils which emitted searchlights; for Frau im Mond in 1929, the façade was draped in lights to evoke stars, and above the entrances skyscraper cities jutted out, from the centres of which model spaceships travelled to a moon globe and back; and for Asphalt, also in 1929, a huge transparency of a street scene—taken from the credits—was mounted on the front of the building, with speeding cars in the foreground, and alternately lighted and darkened; wooden gates swung closed in front of it, with the title written on them in letters blazing with light. The exception was Fritz Lang's Metropolis, which received a double première on 10 January 1927: the gala première at the Ufa-Palast am Zoo was attended by President Hindenburg but advertised only by a sign above the entrance reading Welturaufführung (world première), while the smaller première, primarily for the press, took place at the smaller Ufa-Pavillon am Nollendorfplatz (Germany's first purpose-built cinema, dating to 1912), which for the occasion was painted silver and illuminated "gleam[ing] like a beacon into the night", as a contemporary reviewer put it, and had a gong mounted over the main entrance; the film's brief German run continued there.

Under the Nazis, for important occasions like the 1935 première of Leni Riefenstahl's Triumph des Willens and the March 1943 celebration of Ufa's own 25th anniversary, Albert Speer modified the façade and it was dressed with large numbers of swastika flags spotlighted from below and with a huge eagle. For the 1936 Summer Olympics in Berlin, Speer designed a false front in simplified classical style. The following year, the remainder of the façade was similarly covered and heavy masonry pylons evoking the entrance to the Olympic Stadium set on either side of the entrance; one architectural historian has noted that except for the lack of windows and the decoration with film posters rather than government symbols, the building then looked very like Speer's New Reich Chancellery.

The building was destroyed by bombing on 23 November 1943. The Zoo Palast was built on the site in 1957, built as a large film festival cinema for the Berlin International Film Festival, and fully renovated in 2011–2013. As part of a lease agreement, it became part of the Bikini-Berlin building complex in 2010, and it will remain so until at least 2043.

== Use for premières ==
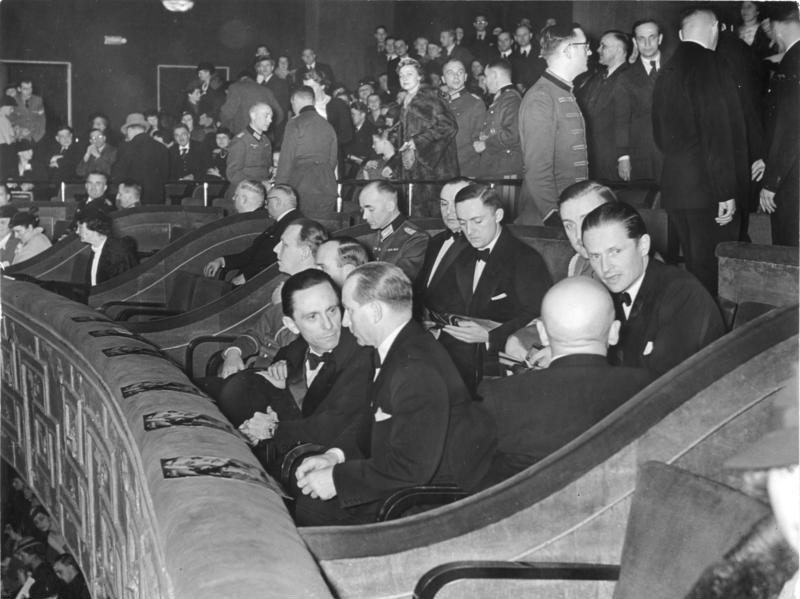
Joseph Goebbels and Ewald von Demandowsky (right rear) at an event in the Ufa-Palast am Zoo, 19 January 1938

The Ufa-Palast am Zoo was one of the main locations for film premières in Germany. These included:

=== Premières under the Weimar Republic ===
- 18 September 1919: Madame Dubarry
- 4 December 1919: Die Puppe
- 14 December 1920: Anna Boleyn
- 9 March 1920: Kohlhiesels Töchter
- 1 September 1920: Sumurun
- 29 October 1920: Der Golem, wie er in die Welt kam
- 14 April 1921: Die Bergkatze
- 22 October 1921: Das indische Grabmal (Part 1)
- 19 November 1921: Das indische Grabmal (Part 2)
- 27 April 1922: Dr. Mabuse, der Spieler (Part 1)
- 26 May 1922: Dr. Mabuse, der Spieler (Part 2)
- 13 November 1922: Phantom
- 7 January 1924: Die Finanzen des Großherzogs
- 14 February 1924: Die Nibelungen (Part 1)
- 26 April 1924: Die Nibelungen (Part 2)
- 23 December 1924: Der letzte Mann
- 16 November 1925: Varieté
- 14 October 1926: Faust
- 17 December 1926: The Holy Mountain
- 10 January 1927: Metropolis
- 24 January 1927: Eine Dubarry von heute
- 22 March 1928: Spione
- 18 February 1929: Asphalt
- 27 August 1929: Der Würger
- 15 October 1929: Frau im Mond
- 17 September 1930: The Copper
- 11 May 1931: M
- 31 August 1931: Bombs on Monte Carlo
- 26 November 1931: Der Draufgänger
- 24 March 1932: Das blaue Licht
- 8. August 1932: Quick
- 12 October 1932: Der schwarze Husar
- 19 November 1932: Der weiße Dämon
- 22 December 1932: F.P.1 antwortet nicht

=== Premières in the Third Reich until the outbreak of World War II ===
- 2 February 1933: Morgenrot
- 9 May 1933: Ein Lied geht um die Welt
- 15 August 1933: Ein gewisser Herr Gran
- 30 August 1933: S.O.S. Eisberg
- 1 December 1933: Sieg des Glaubens
- 8 December 1933: Flüchtlinge
- 29 March 1934: Gold
- 12 March 1935: Artisten
- 28 March 1935: Triumph des Willens
- 19 November 1935: Frisians in Peril
- 30 December 1935: Tag der Freiheit: Unsere Wehrmacht
- 23 January 1936: Traumulus
- 10 July 1936: Weiberregiment
- 16 October 1936: Stadt Anatol
- 23 December 1936: Unter heißem Himmel
- 15 July 1937: Der Mann, der Sherlock Holmes war
- 20 August 1937: Alarm in Peking
- 19 October 1937: Der zerbrochene Krug
- 21 December 1937: Gasparone
- 6 January 1938: Der Berg ruft
- 11 February 1938: Der Tiger von Eschnapur
- 20 April 1938: Olympia
- 26 February 1938: Das indische Grabmal
- 1 April 1938: Fünf Millionen suchen einen Erben
- 18 October 1938: Dreizehn Stühle

=== Premières during World War II ===
- 20 March 1940: Stern von Rio
- 28 November 1940: Der ewige Jude
- 6 December 1940: Bismarck
- 30 December 1940: Wunschkonzert
- 14 February 1941: Ohm Krüger
- 12 June 1942: Die große Liebe
- 5 March 1943: Münchhausen

=== Gala premières following first showing elsewhere ===
- 15 November 1929: The White Hell of Pitz Palu
- 19 September 1933: Hitlerjunge Quex
- 23 September 1936: Der Bettelstudent
- 17 March 1939: Wasser für Canitoga
- 15 August 1939: Es war eine rauschende Ballnacht
- 26 September 1939: Robert Koch, der Bekämpfer des Todes
- 19 January 1940: Wir tanzen um die Welt
- 24 September 1940: Jud Süß
- 23 October 1941: Heimkehr

The première of Fritz Lang's Das Testament des Dr. Mabuse, like those of his earlier films, was scheduled to be held at the Ufa-Palast am Zoo, on 23 March 1933, but was cancelled when the film was banned by the Nazis.
