= The Victory of Faith =

- 1933 German film poster
- Directed by: Leni Riefenstahl
- Written by: Leni Riefenstahl
- Produced by: Leni Riefenstahl
- Starring: Adolf Hitler; Rudolf Hess; Hermann Göring; Julius Streicher; Joseph Goebbels; Ernst Röhm
- Cinematography: Sepp Allgeier; Franz Weihmayr; Walter Frentz; Richard Quaas; Paul Tesch
- Edited by: Leni Riefenstahl; Waldemar Gaede
- Music by: Herbert Windt
- Production companies: Propagandaministerium; Hauptabteilung Film
- Distributed by: Universum Film AG
- Release date: 1 December 1933
- Running time: 64 minutes
- Country: Germany
- Language: German

Der Sieg des Glaubens (English: The Victory of Faith, Victory of Faith, or Victory of the Faith) is the first Nazi propaganda film directed by Leni Riefenstahl. Her film recounts the Fifth Party Rally of the Nazi Party, which occurred in Nuremberg, Germany, from 30 August to 3 September 1933. The film is of great historic interest because it shows Adolf Hitler and Ernst Röhm on close and intimate terms, before Hitler had Röhm killed during the Night of the Long Knives on 1 July 1934. As he then sought to remove Röhm from German history, Hitler ordered all known copies of the film be destroyed, and it was considered lost until a surviving copy was found in the 1980s in East Germany.

The form of the film is very similar to her later and much more expansive film of the 1934 rally, Triumph of the Will. Der Sieg des Glaubens, which was funded and promoted by the Nazi Party, celebrates the victory of the Nazis in achieving power when Hitler assumed the role of Chancellor of Germany in January 1933, and is considered Nazi propaganda.

== Synopsis ==
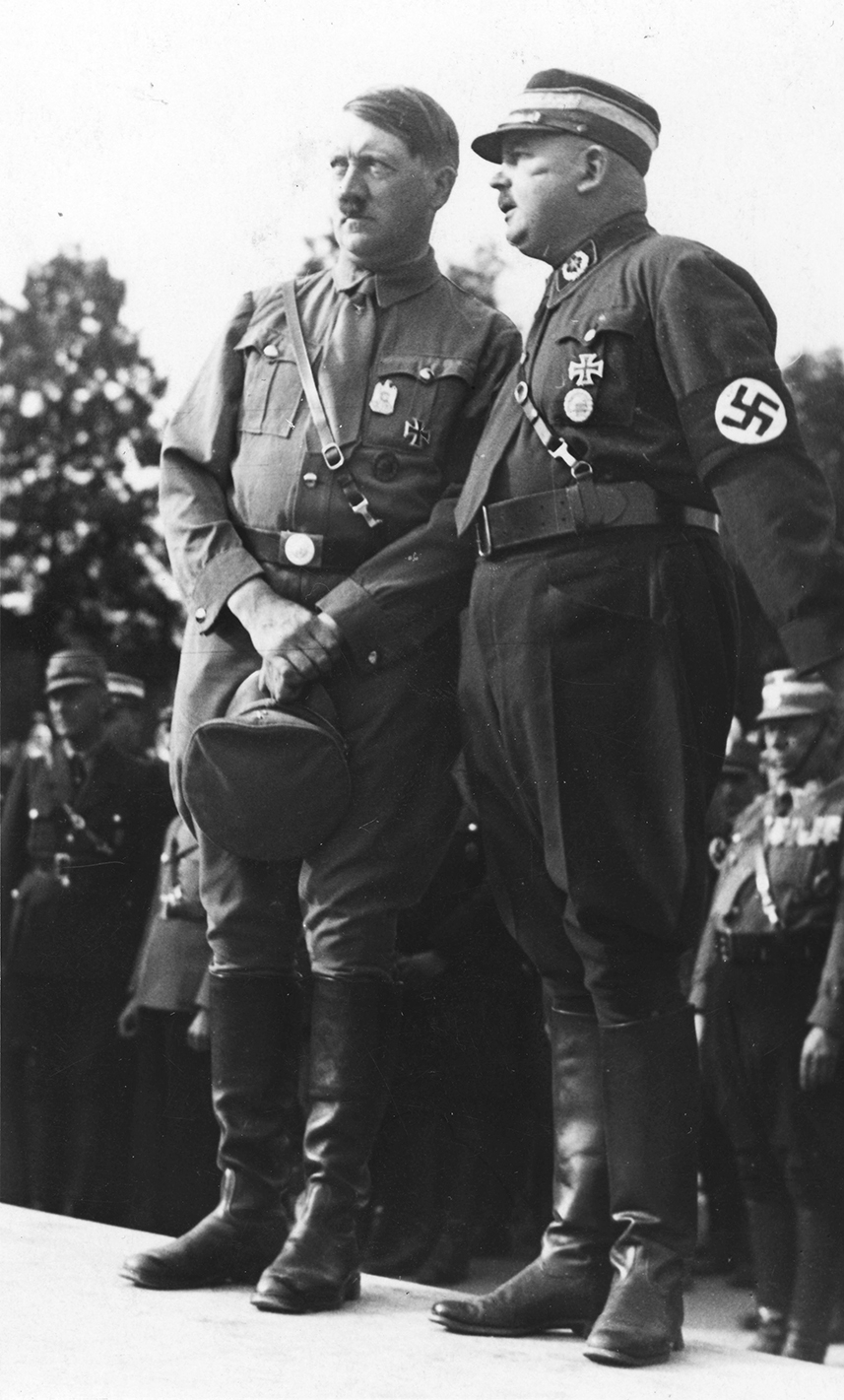
Ernst Röhm, Sturmabteilung (SA) Chief of Staff, with Hitler in August 1933. The following year, Röhm was shot on Hitler's orders, after he refused to commit suicide, in the Night of the Long Knives purge of 1934.

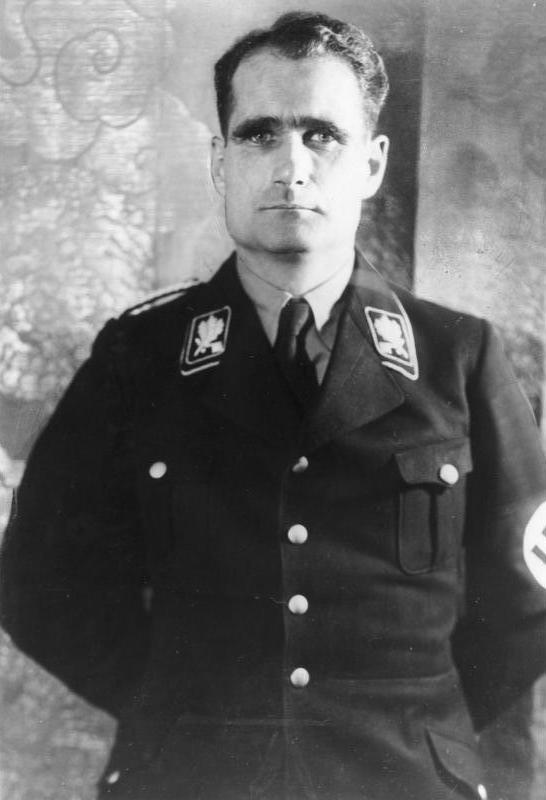
Rudolf Hess in 1933

Like her Nazi propaganda films of 1935, the short Tag der Freiheit: Unsere Wehrmacht (Day of Freedom: Our Armed Forces) and the classic propaganda feature Triumph of the Will, Der Sieg des Glaubens documents a Nazi Party rally, the Fifth NSDAP Congress, in a straight chronological format. It has no voiceover or commentary. The activities captured include the welcoming of foreign diplomats and other party members and politicians – such as Franz von Papen – at the Nuremberg train station; Adolf Hitler's arrival at the airport and his meeting with important party members such as Joseph Goebbels and Hermann Göring; massive Sturmabteilung (SA, colloquially known as "Brownshirts") parades; and Hitler's speech on the assumption of power by the party, and the tenth anniversary of the German National Socialist movement.

The events shown are in roughly chronological order, starting with the arrival of Hitler in Nuremberg and the welcome given by the Nuremberg Gauleiter, Julius Streicher. Rudolf Hess is shown sitting next to Hitler, and the Fuhrer passes him a bunch of flowers given to him by admirers. Hitler is also shown in several cameos with Ernst Röhm, then leader of the SA. The welcome includes a speech from a senior official of the Italian National Fascist Party, Arturo Marpicati, with conveyed greetings from Benito Mussolini. It is followed by the rally on the vast parade ground recently built by Albert Speer, and includes a shot of a Zeppelin airship floating by, complete with swastika on the tailfin. There is also a separate rally of Hitler Youth, with an introduction by Baldur von Schirach. There follows a march past in the streets of the old city, with the party leaders receiving the salutes of the massed goosestepping ranks of the SA and the SS. Familiar faces include Hermann Göring and a brief cameo appearance of Heinrich Himmler, who would be the star of Riefenstahl's next propaganda film, The Triumph of the Will, after his and Göring's successful efforts incite Hitler to massacre the leadership of the SA.

Marching troops feature again in the final sequences in the main parade ground, with tributes to the fallen from Hitler and Röhm, and various flag ceremonies which appear to have quasi-religious significance to the members of the party. The shots of marching feet and legs has an almost hypnotic effect on the viewer, well parodied by a later British wartime short which edits the time of the marching to the popular song "The Lambeth Walk".

== Ernst Röhm ==
Ernst Röhm, head of the SA and, at the time, the second most powerful man within the Nazi Party, is prominent in The Victory of Faith. In less than a year, during the Night of the Long Knives, Röhm and many of his lieutenants would be executed under Hitler's orders. Hitler personally roused Röhm from his bed at his lakeside hotel when he arrested him for alleged treason in devising a plot against Hitler, a trumped up charge created by Himmler, Göring and Reinhard Heydrich. All references to Röhm were ordered to be erased from German history, which included the destruction of all known copies of the film in 1934, probably on Hitler's order.

The 1935 film Triumph of the Will was produced to replace it but differs in that the upper hierarchy of the Party, "Hitler's paladins", do not receive nearly as much attention in the later film as they did in the earlier one.

== Relation to Triumph of the Will ==
Riefenstahl's next propaganda film, Triumph of the Will, which documented the next year's party rally, follows a similar script, which is evident when one sees both films side by side. For example, the city of Nuremberg scenes – down to the shot of a cat that is included in a car-driving sequence in both films. There are panning shots across the roofs of the old town, showing the city awakening before the rally starts in earnest. The camera angles and editing that made Riefenstahl's Triumph of the Will a ground-breaking film are already demonstrated in The Victory of Faith. Furthermore, Herbert Windt reused much of the musical score for this film in the later one, which he also scored.

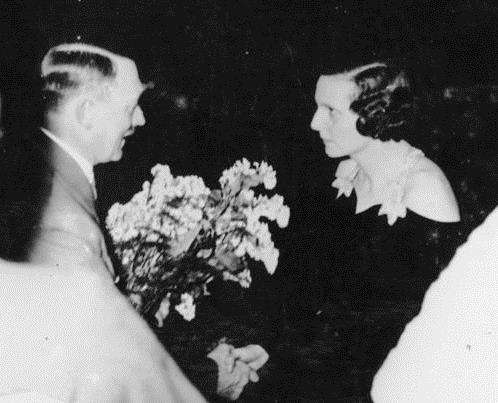
Hitler congratulates Leni Riefenstahl in 1934.

== Release ==
The film premiered in Berlin on 1 December 1933, and around 20 million Germans watched the film.

== Preservation status ==
After the war, it was assumed that all copies had been destroyed, including Riefenstahl's personal copy, making it a lost film. In 1986, a copy turned up in the German Democratic Republic's film archives. Leni Riefenstahl's personal copy was later discovered in the UK as she left a copy there in 1934. That is the sole surviving copy which has been remastered.

== See also ==
- Leni Riefenstahl
- List of German films 1933-1945
- Nazism and cinema
- Nazi propaganda
- List of rediscovered films
- Nuremberg rallies
- Festliches Nürnberg

== Works cited ==
- Niven, Bill (2018). Hitler and Film: The Führer's Hidden Passion. Yale University Press. ISBN 9780300200362.
