= Day of Freedom: Our Armed Forces =

Tag der Freiheit: Unsere Wehrmacht
- Wehrmacht in front of audience in the film
- Directed by: Leni Riefenstahl
- Written by: Leni Riefenstahl
- Produced by: Leni Riefenstahl
- Starring: Adolf Hitler; Hermann Göring; Rudolf Hess; Heinrich Himmler
- Cinematography: Hans Ertl; Walter Frentz; Albert Kling; Guzzi Lantschner; Kurt Neubert; Willy Zielke
- Edited by: Leni Riefenstahl
- Music by: Peter Kreuder
- Production company: Reichsparteitag-Film
- Distributed by: Universum Film AG
- Release date: 30 December 1935
- Running time: 28 minutes (surviving incomplete copy)
- Country: Germany
- Language: German

Tag der Freiheit: Unsere Wehrmacht (Day of Freedom: Our Armed Forces) is the third documentary directed by Leni Riefenstahl, following Der Sieg des Glaubens and Triumph des Willens. Her third film recounts the Seventh Party Rally of the Nazi Party, which occurred in Nuremberg in 1935, and focuses on the German army.

Tag der Freiheit was considered lost at the end of World War II, but an incomplete print of the film was discovered in the 1970s—the extant footage reveals Riefenstahl mainly reprising the approach she used in Triumph of the Will (1934), though certain more expressionistic sequences clearly presage the more audacious style she would adopt for Olympia (1938).

== Synopsis ==
The film depicts a mock battle staged by German troops during the ceremonies at Nuremberg on German Armed Forces Day 1935. The camera follows the soldiers from their early-morning preparations in their tent city as they march singing to the vast parade grounds where a miniature war involving infantry, cavalry, aircraft, flak guns and the first public appearance of Germany's new forbidden tank is presented before Hitler and thousands of spectators.

The film ends with a montage of Nazi flags to the tune of the "Deutschlandlied" and a shot of German fighter biplanes flying overhead in a swastika formation.

== Background ==
Werner von Blomberg and the army requested to know what role the military would play in Triumph of the Will (1935), but were told that it was not featured due to the footage depicting the military being low-quality. Von Blomberg demanded that a film about the military.

Hitler proposed his own "artistic" compromise where Triumph of the Will would open with a camera slowly tracking down a row of all the "overlooked" generals (and placate each general's ego). According to her own testimony, Riefenstahl boldly refused his suggestion and insisted on keeping artistic control over Triumph of the Will.

The film was shot by six cameramen in one day.

== Works cited ==
- Hull, David (1969). Film in the Third Reich: Art and Propaganda in Nazi Germany. Simon & Schuster. SBN 671214861.
