= Triumph of the Will =

1935 German Nazi propaganda film

- Theatrical release poster by Erich Ludwig Stahl
- Directed by: Leni Riefenstahl
- Written by: Leni Riefenstahl; Walter Ruttmann; Eberhard Taubert
- Produced by: Leni Riefenstahl
- Starring: Adolf Hitler; Heinrich Himmler; Viktor Lutze; Hermann Göring; Max Amann; Martin Bormann; Walter Buch; Richard Walther Darré; Otto Dietrich; Sepp Dietrich; Hans Frank; Joseph Goebbels; Jakob Grimminger; Rudolf Hess; Reinhard Heydrich; Konstantin Hierl; Franz Hofer; Robert Ley
- Cinematography: Sepp Allgeier
- Edited by: Leni Riefenstahl (uncredited)
- Music by: Herbert Windt
- Production company: Reichsparteitag-Film
- Distributed by: UFA
- Release date: 28 March 1935
- Running time: 114 minutes
- Country: Germany
- Language: German

Triumph of the Will (German: Triumph des Willens) is a 1935 German Nazi propaganda film directed, produced, edited, and co-written by Leni Riefenstahl. Adolf Hitler commissioned the film and served as an unofficial executive producer; his name appears in the opening titles. It chronicles the 1934 Nazi Party Congress (rally) in Nuremberg, which was attended by more than 700,000 Nazi supporters. The film contains excerpts of speeches given by Nazi leaders at the Congress, including Hitler, Rudolf Hess and Julius Streicher, interspersed with footage of massed Sturmabteilung (SA) and Schutzstaffel (SS) troops and public reaction. Its overriding theme is the return of Germany as a great power with Hitler as its leader. The film was produced after the Night of the Long Knives, and many formerly prominent SA members are absent.

Following its release in March 1935, it became a major example of film used as propaganda and was well-received at home. Riefenstahl's techniques—such as moving cameras, aerial photography, the use of long-focus lenses to create a distorted perspective, and the revolutionary approach to the use of music and cinematography—have earned Triumph of the Will recognition as one of the most effective propaganda films in history. It won several awards in Germany, France and Italy.

During World War II, Frank Capra's seven-film series Why We Fight was directly inspired by Triumph of the Will and the United States' response to it. The film continued to influence films, documentaries and commercials after the war.

In today's Germany, Triumph of the Will is not banned. In 2018, the Federal Review Board for Media Harmful to Young Persons even rejected an application to index an imported version. The decision explained that Triumph of the Will is a historical document that can be classified as having high art-historical value. Nevertheless, the film is not freely distributed in Germany because the rights holder, Transit Film, exercises its copyright and takes action against unauthorized publications. Screenings that take place with the consent of Transit Film are held in an educational context.

== Synopsis ==
The film begins with a prologue establishing the present-day as 5 September 1934 and the elapsed time since World War I, the Treaty of Versailles, Hitler's appointment as chancellor, climaxing in his visit to Nuremberg on that day. It is the only commentary in the entire film.

Day 1: The film opens with shots of the clouds above the city, and then moves through the clouds to float above the assembling masses below, with the intention of portraying the beauty and majesty of the scene. The cruciform shadow of Hitler's plane is visible as it passes over the tiny figures marching below, accompanied by an orchestral arrangement of the Horst-Wessel-Lied. Upon arriving at the Nuremberg airport, Hitler and other Nazi leaders emerge from his plane to thunderous applause and a cheering crowd. He is then driven into Nuremberg, through equally enthusiastic people, to his hotel where a night rally is later held.

Day 2: The second day begins with images of Nuremberg at dawn, accompanied by an extract from the Act III Prelude (Wach Auf!) of Richard Wagner's Die Meistersinger von Nürnberg. Following this is a montage of the attendees preparing for the opening of the Reich Party Congress, and footage of the top Nazi officials arriving at the Luitpold Arena. The film then cuts to the opening ceremony, where Rudolf Hess announces the start of the Congress. The camera then introduces much of the Nazi hierarchy and covers their opening speeches, including Joseph Goebbels, Alfred Rosenberg, Hans Frank, Fritz Todt, Robert Ley and Julius Streicher. Then the film cuts to an outdoor rally for the Reichsarbeitsdienst (Labor Service), which is primarily a series of quasi-military drills by men carrying spades. This is also where Hitler gives his first speech on the merits of the Labour Service and praising them for their work in rebuilding Germany. The day then ends with a torchlight SA parade and fireworks display in which Viktor Lutze speaks to the crowds.

Day 3: The third day starts with a Hitler Youth rally on the parade ground. Again the camera covers the Nazi dignitaries arriving and the introduction of Hitler by Baldur von Schirach. Hitler then addresses the Youth, describing in militaristic terms how they must harden themselves and prepare for sacrifice. Everyone present, including General Werner von Blomberg, then assemble for a military pass and review, featuring Wehrmacht cavalry and various armored vehicles. That night Hitler delivers another speech to low-ranking party officials by torchlight, commemorating the first year since the Nazis took power and declaring that the party and state are one entity.

Day 4: The fourth day is the climax of the film, where the most memorable of the imagery is presented. Hitler, flanked by Heinrich Himmler and Viktor Lutze, walks through a long wide expanse with over 150,000 SA and SS troops standing at attention, to lay a wreath at a First World War memorial. Hitler then reviews the parading SA and SS men, following which Hitler and Lutze deliver a speech where they discuss the Night of the Long Knives purge of the SA several months prior. Lutze reaffirms the SA's loyalty to the regime, and Hitler absolves the SA of any crimes committed by Ernst Röhm. New party flags are consecrated by letting them touch the Blutfahne (the same cloth flag said to have been carried by the fallen Nazis during the Beer Hall Putsch) and, following a final parade in front of the Nuremberg Frauenkirche, Hitler delivers his closing speech. In it he reaffirms the primacy of the Nazi Party in Germany, declaring, "All loyal Germans will become National Socialists. Only the best National Socialists are party comrades!" Hess then leads the assembled crowd in a final Sieg Heil salute for Hitler, marking the close of the party congress. The entire crowd sings the Horst-Wessel-Lied as the camera focuses on the giant Swastika banner, which fades into a line of silhouetted men in Nazi party uniforms, marching in formation as the lyrics "Comrades shot by the Red Front and the Reactionaries march in spirit together in our columns" are sung.

== Production ==
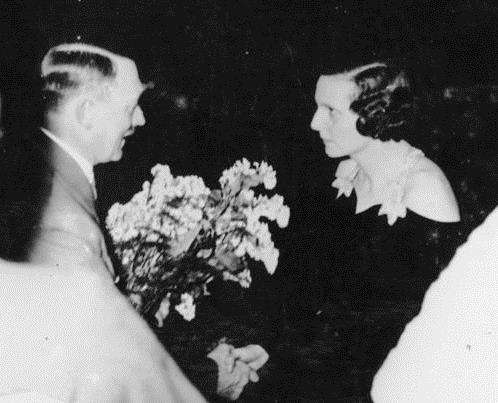
Hitler congratulates Riefenstahl in 1934.

Riefenstahl, a popular German actress, had directed her first film called Das blaue Licht (The Blue Light) in 1932. Hitler was impressed with Das blaue Licht, and in 1933 asked her to direct a film about the Nazis' annual Nuremberg Rally, which became Der Sieg des Glaubens (The Victory of Faith). Hitler chose Riefenstahl as he wanted the film as "artistically satisfying" as possible to appeal to a non-political audience, but he also believed that propaganda must admit no element of doubt.

The Victory of Faith faced numerous technical problems, including a lack of preparation (Riefenstahl reported having just a few days) and Hitler's apparent unease at being filmed. Though the film apparently did well at the box office, it later became a serious embarrassment to the Nazis after SA Leader Ernst Röhm, who had a prominent role in the film, was executed during the Night of the Long Knives. All references to Röhm were ordered to be erased from German history, which included the destruction of all copies of The Victory of Faith. It was considered a lost film until a copy turned up in the 1980s in the German Democratic Republic's film archives.

In April 1934, Riefenstahl was commissioned by Hitler to create a successor film to The Victory of Faith. Riefenstahl however, remained focused on production of her own film Tiefland (which was released only in 1954), while fellow director Walter Ruttmann worked on the party film. Ruttmann's ideals departed significantly from The Victory of Faith and sought to reorient the focus of the film onto the history of the Nazi movement rather than Hitler himself. Hitler visited the studio on 6 December 1934 and permanently removed Ruttmann from the project, leaving Riefenstahl in sole control of what would become Triumph des Willens (Triumph of the Will). Riefenstahl claimed that she attempted to avoid doing the film by committing to Tiefland and having Ruttmann doing it instead.

=== Filming ===
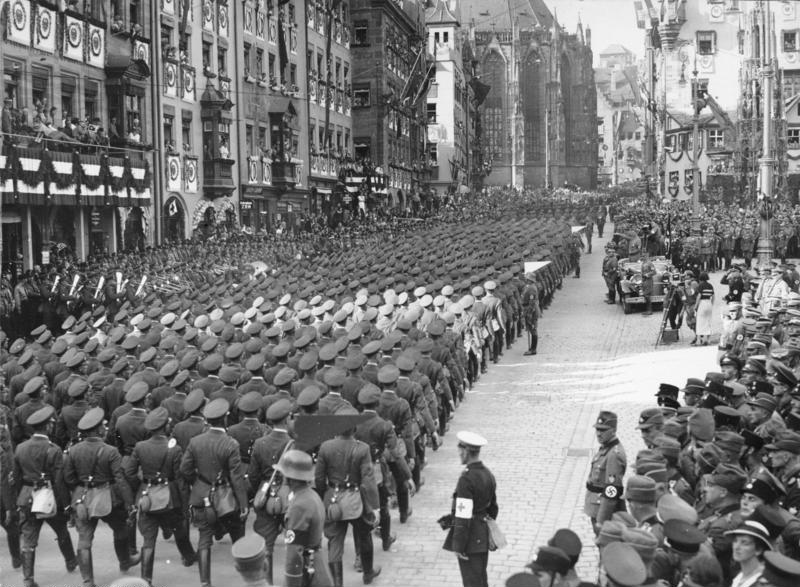
Riefenstahl and her film crew in front of Hitler's car during a parade in Nuremberg

The film follows a design similar to The Victory of Faith, with the city of Nuremberg scenes, even to the shot of a cat, included in the city driving sequence in both films. Herbert Windt reused much of his musical score from Victory of Faith, in Triumph des Willens, which he also scored.

Riefenstahl's staff had sixteen cameramen, who all had an assistant of their own, using thirty cameras and four complete sound-equipment trucks. 120 assistants worked on the film. Riefenstahl shot an estimated 61 hours of footage to create the two hour film.

Riefenstahl shot Triumph of the Will on a nominal budget of roughly 280,000 RM (approximately US$110,000 in 1934, $1.54 m in 2015). However Hans Saupert, chief of staff for Franz Xaver Schwarz, claimed that the actual cost of the film was 1 million RM. Riefenstahl claimed that the film was financed by her own efforts and a distribution agreement with Ufa, but she received a large amount of financial support from the Nazis directly and indirectly through construction projects for the rally. While being interrogated after World War II, she admitted to having a Reich Party Account, and she was reimbursed by the Nazis for all expenditures.

Extensive preparations were facilitated by the cooperation of party members, the military, and high-ranking Nazis like Goebbels. In 1975, Susan Sontag wrote that "The Rally was planned not only as a spectacular mass meeting, but as a spectacular propaganda film." Goebbels wanted film propaganda to be done using subtle methods, but Triumph of the Will was produced against his wishes.

Albert Speer, Hitler's personal architect, designed the set in Nuremberg and did most of the coordination for the event. Many of the marches were faked with actors, and set up in advance by Speer to be ready before Leni Riefenstahl arrived on set for filming. Pits were dug in front of the speakers' platform so Riefenstahl could get the camera angles she wanted, and tracks were laid so that her cameramen could get traveling shots of the crowd. When the audio from rough cuts was not up to par, major party leaders and high-ranking public officials reenacted their speeches in a studio for her.

=== Editing ===
Riefenstahl was visited by high-ranking Nazis during the editing process. Hitler suggested the title Triumph of the Will in September 1934. Goebbels came on 5 December, Hitler and Julius Schaub on 6 December, and Hess on 7 December. She started with 130,000 metres of film and reduced it to 3,000 metres by March 1935. The final product was almost twice as long as Victory of Faith.

Walter von Reichenau visited Riefenstahl in December 1934 to see the footage she shot of the military. He was disappointed that Riefenstahl was not going to include the footage in the final film due to the poor quality caused by bad weather during the military exercises. She later produced Day of Freedom: Our Armed Forces which focused on the military at the 1935 Nuremberg Rally.

== Reception ==
Triumph of the Will was approved by the censors on 26 March 1935, and premiered on 28 March at the Berlin Ufa Palace Theater. Within two months the film had earned 815,000 Reichsmark (equivalent to 4 million 2021 euros), and Ufa considered it one of the three most profitable films of that year. Hitler praised the film as being an "incomparable glorification of the power and beauty of our Movement." For her efforts, Riefenstahl was rewarded with the German Film Prize (Deutscher Filmpreis), a gold medal at the 1935 Venice Biennale, and the Grand Prix at the 1937 World Exhibition in Paris. However, there were few claims that the film would result in a mass influx of "converts" to fascism, and the Nazis apparently did not make a serious effort to promote the film outside of Germany. Film historian Richard Taylor also said that Triumph of the Will was not generally used for propaganda purposes inside Nazi Germany. The Independent wrote in 2003: "Triumph of the Will seduced many wise men and women, persuaded them to admire rather than to despise, and undoubtedly won the Nazis friends and allies all over the world."

The reception in other countries was not always as enthusiastic. British documentarian Paul Rotha called it tedious, while others were repelled by its pro-Nazi sentiments. During World War II, Frank Capra helped to create a direct response, through the film series called Why We Fight, a series of newsreels commissioned by the United States government that spliced in footage from Triumph of the Will, but recontextualized it so that it promoted the cause of the Allies instead. Capra later remarked that Triumph of the Will "fired no gun, dropped no bombs. But as a psychological weapon aimed at destroying the will to resist, it was just as lethal." Clips from Triumph of the Will were also used in an Allied propaganda short called General Adolph Takes Over, set to the British dance tune "The Lambeth Walk". The legions of marching soldiers, as well as Hitler giving his Nazi salute, were made to look like wind-up dolls, dancing to the music. The Danish resistance used to take over cinemas and force the projectionist to show Swinging the Lambeth Walk (as it was also known); Erik Barrow has said: "The extraordinary risks were apparently felt justified by a moment of savage anti-Hitler ridicule." Also during World War II, the poet Dylan Thomas wrote a screenplay for and narrated These Are The Men, a propaganda piece using Triumph of the Will footage to discredit Nazi leadership.

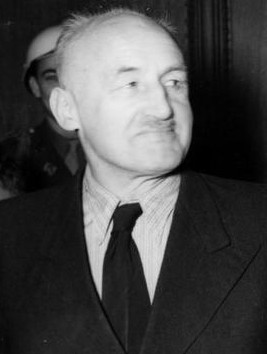
Julius Streicher in custody in 1945

Like American filmmaker D. W. Griffith's The Birth of a Nation, Triumph of the Will has been criticized as a use of spectacular filmmaking to promote a profoundly unethical system. In her defense, Riefenstahl said that she was naïve about the Nazis when she made it and had no knowledge of any genocidal or antisemitic policies. She pointed out that Triumph of the Will contains "not one single anti-semitic word". It contains a comment by Julius Streicher that "a people that does not protect its racial purity will perish".

Roger Ebert wrote that for some, "the very absence of anti-semitism in Triumph of the Will looks like a calculation; excluding the central motif of almost all of Hitler's public speeches must have been a deliberate decision to make the film more efficient as propaganda."

Riefenstahl said in 1964:

If you see this film again today you ascertain that it doesn't contain a single reconstructed scene. Everything in it is true. And it contains no tendentious commentary at all. It is history. A pure historical film ... it is film-vérité. It reflects the truth that was then in 1934, history. It is therefore a documentary. Not a propaganda film. Oh! I know very well what propaganda is. That consists of recreating events in order to illustrate a thesis, or, in the face of certain events, to let one thing go in order to accentuate another. I found myself, me, at the heart of an event which was the reality of a certain time and a certain place. My film is composed of what stemmed from that.

Riefenstahl was an active participant in the rally, though in later years she downplayed her influence significantly, claiming, "I just observed and tried to film it well. The idea that I helped to plan it is downright absurd." Ebert states that Triumph of the Will is "by general consent [one] of the best documentaries ever made", but added that because it reflects the ideology of a movement regarded by many as evil, it poses "a classic question of the contest between art and morality: Is there such a thing as pure art, or does all art make a political statement?" When reviewing the film for his "Great Movies" collection, Ebert reversed his opinion, characterizing his earlier conclusion as "the received opinion that the film is great but evil" and calling it "a terrible film, paralyzingly dull, simpleminded, overlong and not even 'manipulative', because it is too clumsy to manipulate anyone but a true believer".

According to Susan Sontag in 1975, Triumph of the Will is the "most successful, most purely propagandistic film ever made, whose very conception negates the possibility of the filmmaker's having an aesthetic or visual conception independent of propaganda." Sontag points to Riefenstahl's involvement in the planning and design of the Nuremberg ceremonies as evidence that Riefenstahl was working as a propagandist, rather than as an artist in any sense of the word. With some 30 cameras and a crew of 150, the marches, parades, speeches, and processions were orchestrated like a movie set for Riefenstahl's film. Further, this was not the first political film made by Riefenstahl for the Nazis (there was Victory of Faith, 1933), nor was it the last (Day of Freedom, 1935, and Olympia, 1938). "Anyone who defends Riefenstahl's films as documentary", Sontag states, "if documentary is to be distinguished from propaganda, is being disingenuous. In Triumph of Will, the document (the image) is no longer simply the record of reality; 'reality' has been constructed to serve the image." This is considerably different from the position she takes ten years earlier in a 1965 essay entitled "On Style", where she opposes the idea that Riefenstahl's propaganda films are purely propaganda, and writes: "To call Leni Riefenstahl's The Triumph of the Will and The Olympiad masterpieces is not to gloss over Nazi propaganda with aesthetic lenience. The Nazi propaganda is there. But something else is there, too, which we reject at our loss. Because they project the complex movements of intelligence and grace and sensuousness, these two films of Riefenstahl (unique among works of Nazi artists) transcend the categories of propaganda or even reportage. And we find ourselves—to be sure, rather uncomfortably—seeing 'Hitler' and not Hitler, the '1936 Olympics' and not the 1936 Olympics. Through Riefenstahl's genius as a film-maker, the 'content' has—let us even assume, against her intentions—come to play a purely formal role."

== Accolades ==
Award	Date of ceremony	Category	Recipient(s)	Result	Ref.
Venice Film Festival	1935	Gold Medal	Triumph of the Will	Won	

== Influences and legacy ==
Triumph of the Will gave instant and lasting international fame to Riefenstahl. The Economist said it "sealed her reputation as the greatest female filmmaker of the 20th century." For a director who made eight films, only two of which received significant coverage outside of Germany, Riefenstahl had unusually high name recognition for the remainder of her life, most of it stemming from Triumph of the Will. However, her career was also permanently damaged by this association. After the war, Riefenstahl was imprisoned by the Allies for four years for allegedly being a Nazi sympathizer and was permanently blacklisted by the film industry. When she died in 2003—sixty-eight years after the film's premiere—her obituary received significant coverage in many major publications, including the Associated Press, The Wall Street Journal, The New York Times, and The Guardian, most of which reaffirmed the importance of Triumph of the Will.

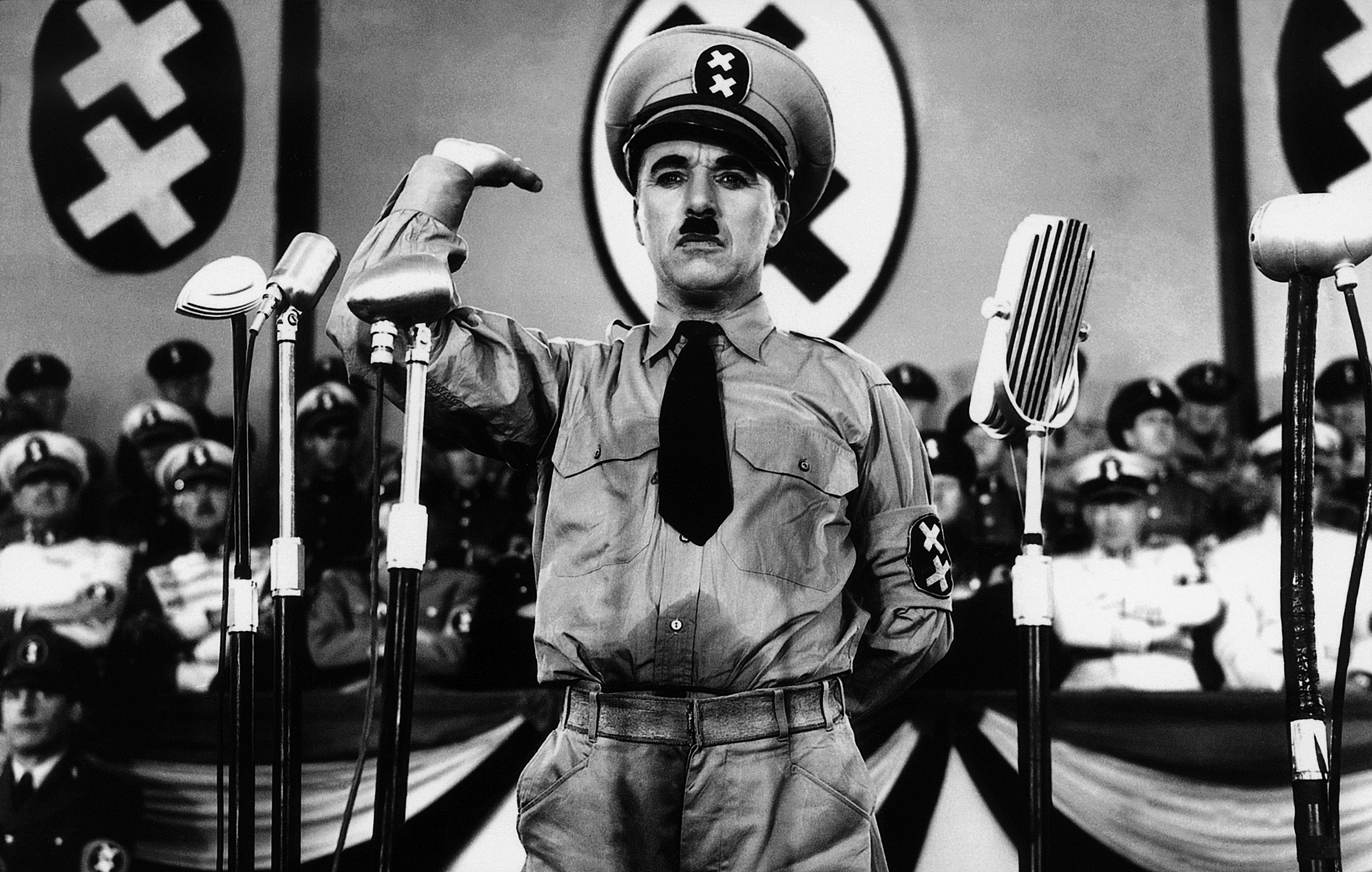
Charlie Chaplin as Adenoid Hynkel in The Great Dictator

Triumph of the Will remains well known for its striking visuals. As one historian notes, "many of the most enduring images of the [Nazi] regime and its leader derive from Riefenstahl's film."

Extensive excerpts of the film were used in Erwin Leiser's documentary Mein Kampf, produced in Sweden in 1960. Riefenstahl unsuccessfully sued the Swedish production company Minerva-Film for copyright violation, although she did receive forty thousand marks in compensation from German and Austrian distributors of the film.

Schichlegruber - Doing the Lambeth Walk or Lambeth Walk – Nazi Style, a short propaganda film made in 1942 by Charles A. Ridley of the British Ministry of Information editing clips from Triumph of the Will to make appear as if Hitler and other Nazis were marching to The Lambeth Walk, a dance craze that the Nazis despised

In 1942, Charles A. Ridley of the British Ministry of Information made a short propaganda film called, among other names, Schichlegruber – Doing the Lambeth Walk and Lambeth Walk – Nazi Style, which edited footage of Hitler and German soldiers from the film to make it appear they were marching and dancing to the song "The Lambeth Walk". (Note: See § External links for video) The targeted-at-Nazis film was a parody of "The Lambeth Walk," a British dance that had been popular in swing clubs in Germany and was denounced by the Nazis as "Jewish mischief and animalistic hopping." The propaganda film was distributed uncredited to newsreel companies, who would supply their own narration.

Charlie Chaplin's satire The Great Dictator (1940) was inspired in large part by Triumph of the Will. Frank Capra used significant footage, with a mocking narration in the first installment of the propagandistic film produced by the United States Army Why We Fight as an exposure of Nazi militarism and totalitarianism to American soldiers and sailors.

== Copyright ==
Triumph of the Will remains in copyright. However, the film is commonly mistaken as belonging to the public domain, and it receives frequent unauthorized home video releases as a result.

=== Germany ===
Riefenstahl initially stated that the Nazi Party held the copyright for the film. She later stated that she held the copyright, as it was her own creation despite funding from the party, after meeting with her lawyer Eugen Krämer in August 1949.

Riefenstahl filed lawsuits against two postwar documentaries which had incorporated footage of Triumph of the Will. The first lawsuit occurred in 1954 against Wolfgang Hartwig, producer of Bis fünf nach zwölf. Hartwig argued that the rights belonged to the state, but reportedly eventually paid compensation to Riefenstahl, who donated it to a charity dedicated to returning prisoners of war. Her second lawsuit against Swedish producer Erwin Leiser's Mein Kampf in 1960 was enveloped in greater public debate about the copyright and morality of works produced during the Nazi regime. The case was settled against her in 1969.

In a judgement by the Federal Court of Justice on 29 December 1966, the copyright to the film was transferred to the Federal Republic of Germany as the legal successor of Nazi Germany. These rights are administered by the federally owned Transit-Film GmbH based in Munich, although it was contractually regulated in 1974 that any public screening until 2004 had to be approved by Riefenstahl and that she received 70% of all revenues.

=== United States ===
In 1996, the copyrights of the film were restored to Riefenstahl under the Uruguay Round Agreements Act, although some aspect of the US copyrights are uncertain.

== See also ==
- The Birth of a Nation (1915 American film), which inspired the second KKK's formation
- List of German films of 1933–1945
- Nazism and cinema
