= Bikini-Berlin =

Building complex in Berlin

Coordinates: 52.5056°N 13.3360°E

The Bikini-Berlin complex, formerly Centre at the Zoo (German: Zentrum am Zoo), is a building complex on Budapest street in the Charlottenburg locality of west Berlin. Bikini Berlin includes the Bikini-Haus shopping centre (after which the entire complex is named), the Huthmacher-Haus, the Zoo Palast, the Kaiser Wilhelm Memorial Church, a multi-storey car park, and the 25hours Hotel. Every building in the complex is a listed building.

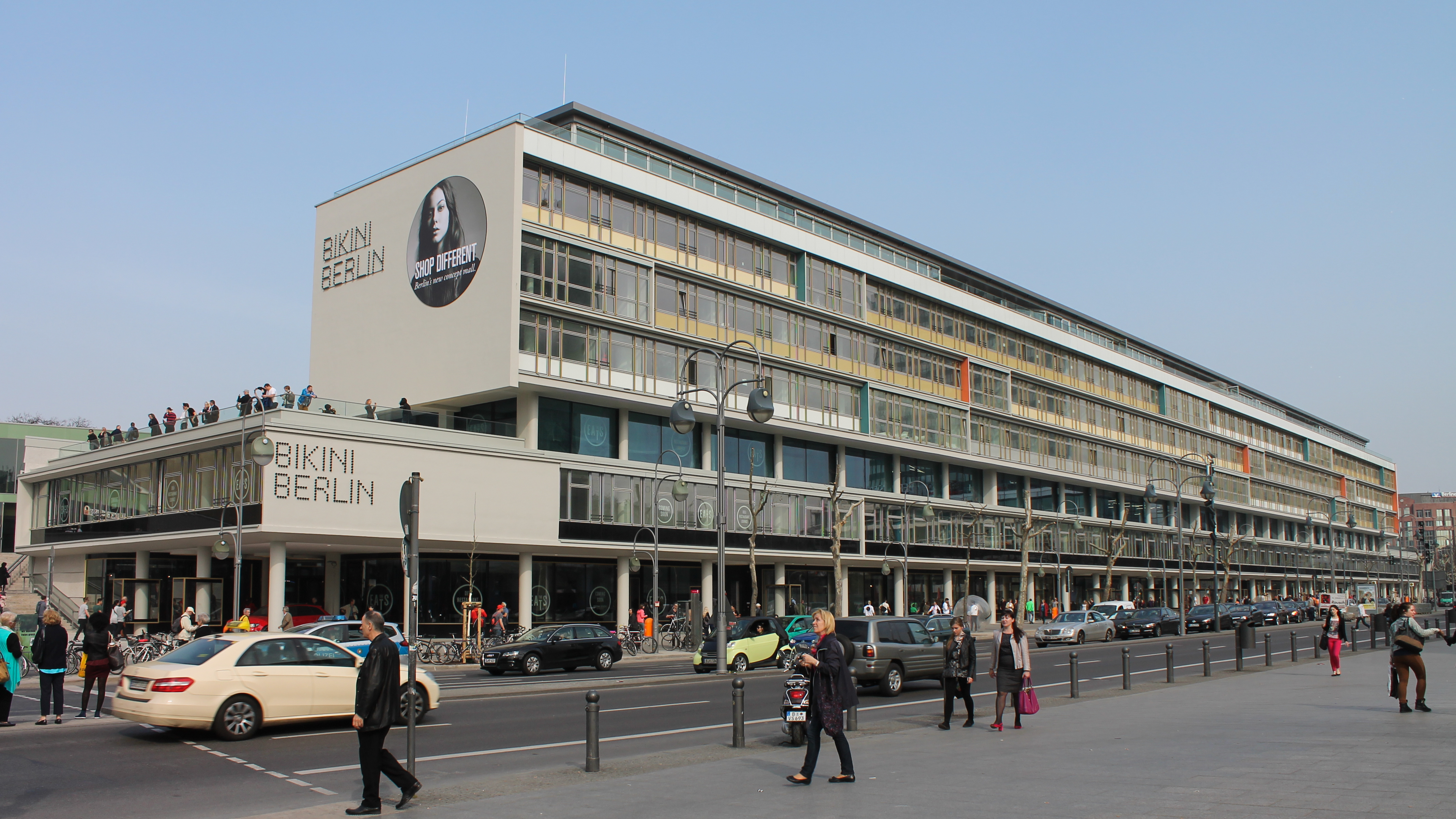
Bikini Haus shopping centre 2014

Bikini-Berlin is to the north of the Breitscheidplatz public square, which holds the Berlin Zoo, after which parts of the complex are named.

== Etymology ==
When it was built in the 1950s, the Bikini-Haus shopping centre was divided into an upper and lower section, with a mostly empty open space on the second floor framed by columns, reminding Berliners of a bare midriff. As a result, the structure of the building was reminiscent of a bikini (in that there was "something up top, something down below, and nothing in the middle"). Later, the building was renovated to enclose the 2nd floor with floor to ceiling glass windows.

== History ==
The complex was first known as the Centre at the Zoo and was constructed sometime prior to World War II. In 1925, Berlin would construct the Capitol am Zoo, a cinema designed by Hans Poelzig, between the Berlin Zoo and the Kaiser Wilhelm Church. On 23 November 1943, Capitol am Zoo and most of the buildings in the complex were destroyed by an allied bombing raid. By 1953, all of the complex that remained, some of which was still being used, was demolished.

From 1956 to 1957, builders following plans from architects Paul Schwebes and Hans Schoszberger constructed the six-story Bikini-Haus, in aid of Germany's postwar Wirtschaftswunder recovery policy. The project was funded by the Marshall plan and investment from Swiss financier Jacques Rosenstein.

By the end of the 1960s, the Bikini-Haus contained more than 60 fashion companies that produced and sold clothing and textiles.

During the 1960s, when the Bikini-Haus was most prosperous, it featured prominently in pro-western propaganda films, along with most of the city's west, as the wealthy contrast to poor East Berlin. However, Bikini-Haus declined following the construction of the Berlin Wall, as it had lost its East Berlin customer base. By the 1970s, West Berlin—especially the Breitscheidplatz and Zoo Station area—suffered economic decline. As result of the prevalence of drug-addiction and prostitution, money fled from the area, and cinemas and theatres along the nearby Ku’damm street closed down.

Furthermore, after the Fall of the Berlin Wall, most of the economic development was focused on the newly enveloped East Berlin. As a result, the struggling Breitscheidplatz and Zoo Station area was sidelined, and the decline of the Bikini-Berlin complex hastened.

=== Renovation ===
In 2002, the complex was purchased by architectural firm Bayerische Hausbau. The firm began planning a renovation in 2006, with a three-digit investment, and this would commence on 2 December 2010 and finish on 3 April 2014. On that day the Complex re-opened. The complex added new tenants, including the 25hours Hotel, its multi-storey car park, and 60 new cafes and restaurants.

The opening was hosted by Ole Tillmann, and featured live music performed by Austrian band Bilderbuch.

== Buildings ==
=== Bikini-Haus ===
The Bikini-Haus is six storeys tall. It contains a shopping mall called Bikini-Berlin, which is not to be confused with the complex itself.

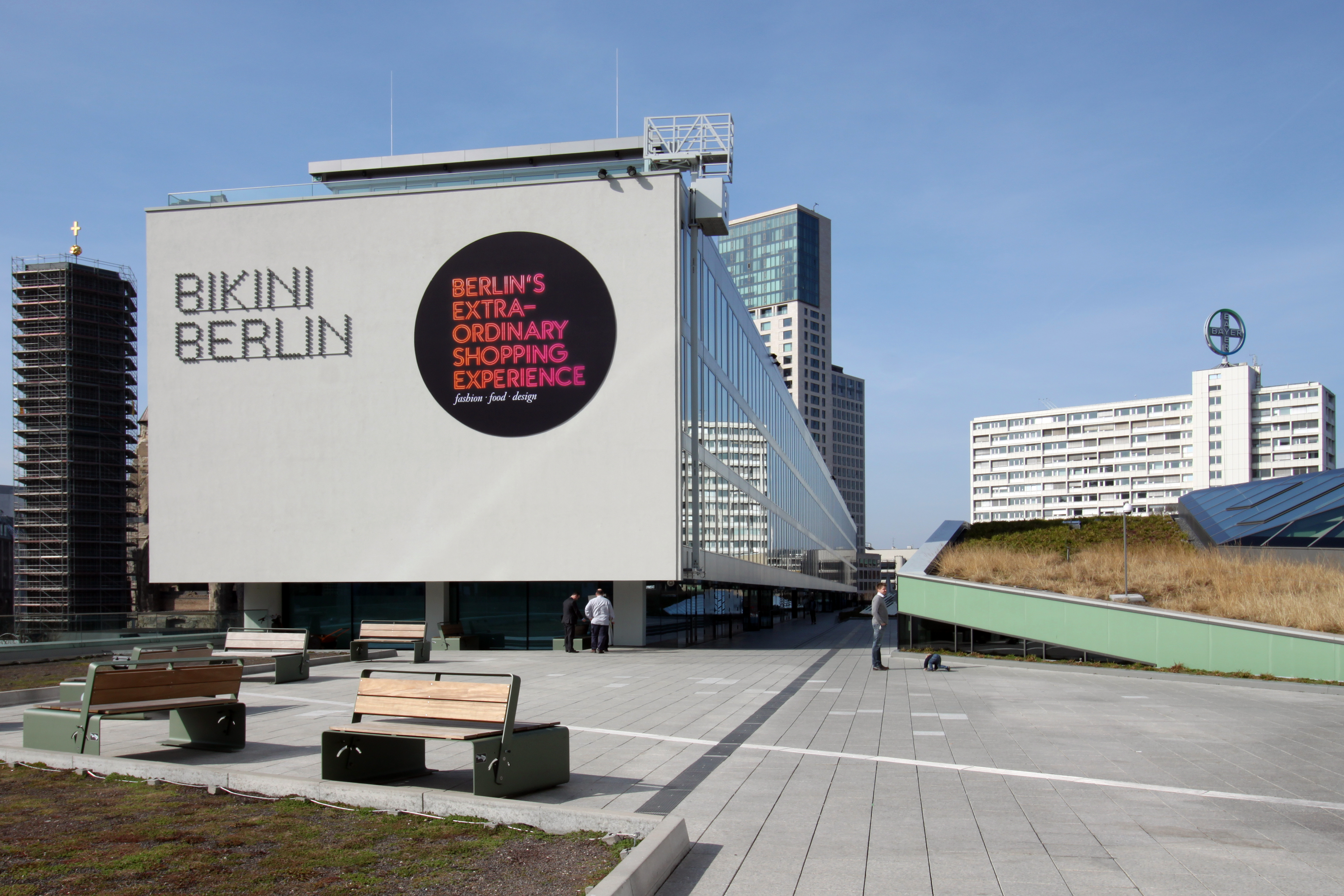
The Bikini-Haus in 2015

From 2 December 2010 to 3 April 2014, Bayerische Hausbau began a renovation of the entire complex. After the renovation, over 54,000 square metres of floor space was added to Bikini-Haus, although the facade remained largely unchanged. Of the new square metres, 17,000 were designated for retail outlets and gastronomy and 7,500 were designated for offices.

Bayerische Hausbau built a 7,000-square-meter rooftop terrace on the top of Bikini-Haus, modeled after the High Line Park in New York. This terrace overlooks the zoo, Breitscheidplatz, and the Kaiser Wilhelm Memorial Church.

=== Huthmacher-Haus ===
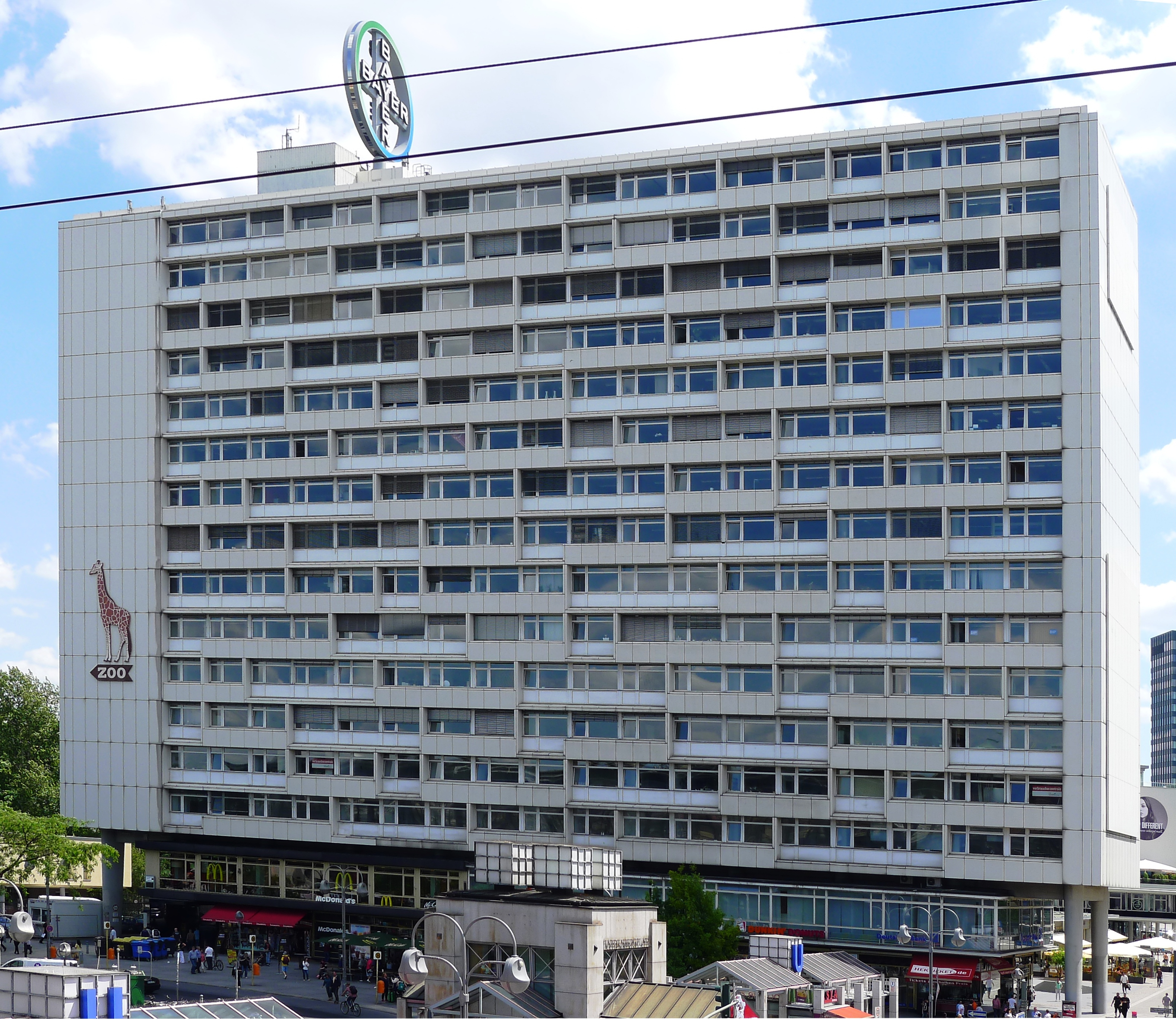
The Huthmacher-Haus in 2014

The Huthmacher-Haus is a 15-storey, 60 metre tall high rise office building built between 1955 and 1957 in accordance with plans by Paul Schwebes and Hans Schoszberger.

The Huthmacher-Haus was built in the style of art-deco. On the façade of the building is a yellow giraffe, a reference to the Berlin zoo.

The Huthmacher-Haus originally contained an office and exhibition space for the women's outerwear industry (German: Damenoberbekleidung), which is commonly acronymised as DOB. Therefore, it was first known as the DOB-High Rise. The Huthmacher-Haus was a post-war centre for Berlin's traditional clothing industry, after the original center at Hausvogteiplatz was decimated. It also housed the restaurant Café Huthmacher, from which the entire building got its name.

Seven thousand East Berlin seamstresses used to come daily to the high-rise for higher paying jobs, but those jobs and companies disappeared following the construction of the Berlin Wall.

In 1983, McDonald's opened its first Berlin location in the Huthmacher-Haus. In late 2016, McDonald's moved out and were replaced by an Arabic fast-food restaurant. In 2017, Bayerische Hausbau sold the building to an investor in the complex Newport Holding, but the former company still act as the property manager.

As of 2018, some of the Huthmacher-Haus' tenants included the transport association Verkehrsverbund Berlin-Brandenburg (VBB), the Federal Police, the Berlin Consumer Center, a language school, a business school, and the owners of the whole Bikini-Berlin complex, Bayerische Hausbau.

In 2020, Newport Holding planned to tear the building down and replace it with a 95-metre-tall office complex, but this was opposed by the German historic monuments commission. Instead, Bayerische Hausbau announced plans to renovate the Huthmacher-Haus, and use it for urban mining. The renovation included fire-protection measures (new hot water pipes and freight elevators), technical building services, cleaning the facade, and adding in new floors and sanitary installations. This renovation was completed in 2023.

=== Zoo Palast ===
Prior to the construction of the Zoo Palast, on the site where it now stands was the Neo-Romanesque Wilhelmshallen, where the first Berlin Six Day Race was held in 1909.

The Zoo Palast, originally called Ufa-Palast am Zoo, opened on September 18, 1919 with the premiere of Ernst Lubitch's Madame Dubarry. The cinema has a seating capacity of 1,700.

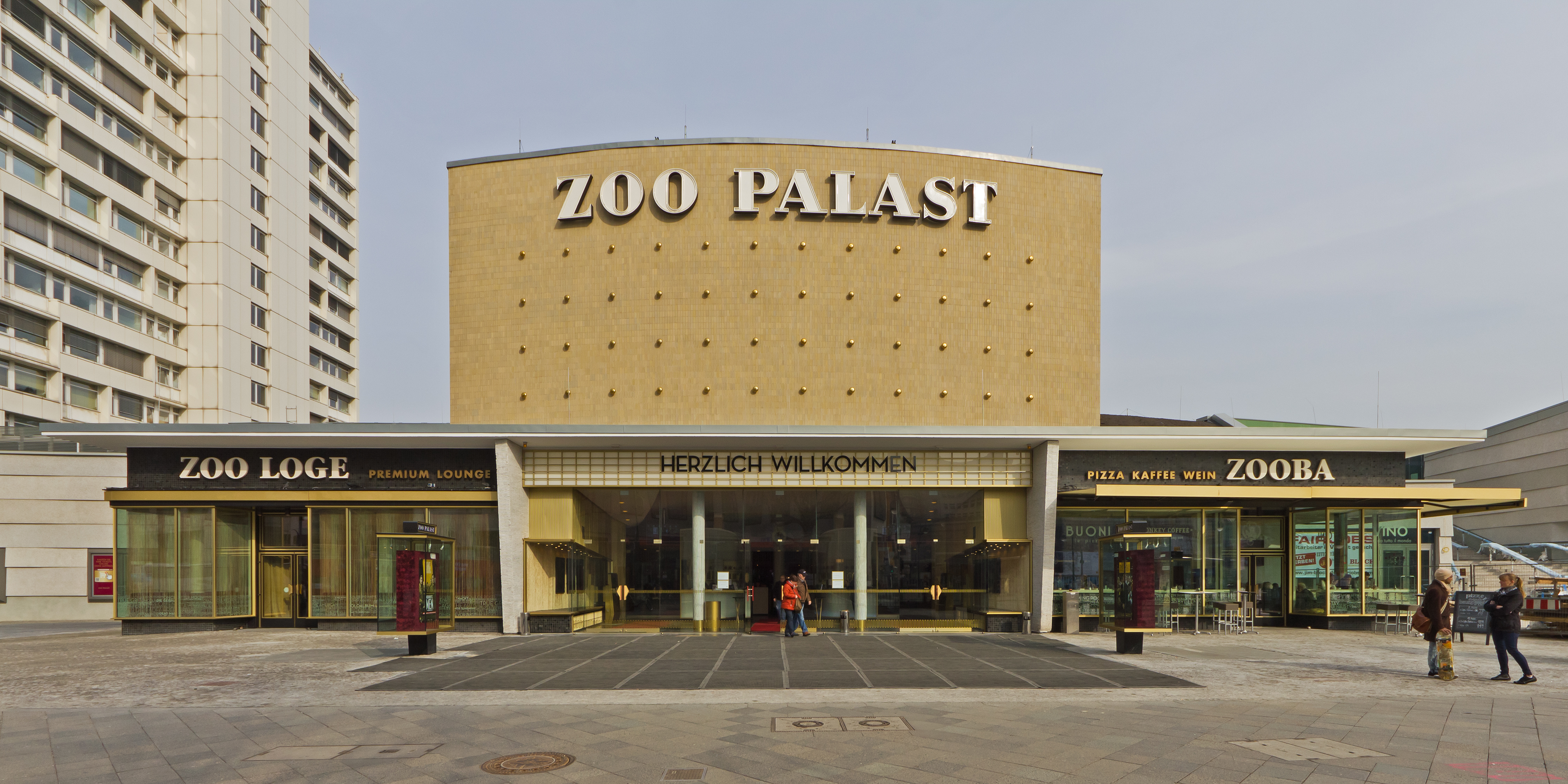
Zoo Palast in 2014

The Zoo Palast reopened on 28 May 1957, when it screened The Zurich Engagement. After its re-opening, the Zoo Palast also became the main venue for the Berlin International Film Festivale.

On 29 December 2010, the Zoo Palast closed, as the result of an expired lease. The Zoo Palast underwent a renovation, before reopening again on 27 November 2013. The cinema is now owned by Hans-Joachim Flebbe, founder and former CEO of the CinemaxX chain. Following a lease agreement with Bayerische Hausbau, it became part of the Bikini-Berlin building complex in 2010, and it will remain so until at least 2043.

=== Kaiser Wilhelm Memorial Church ===
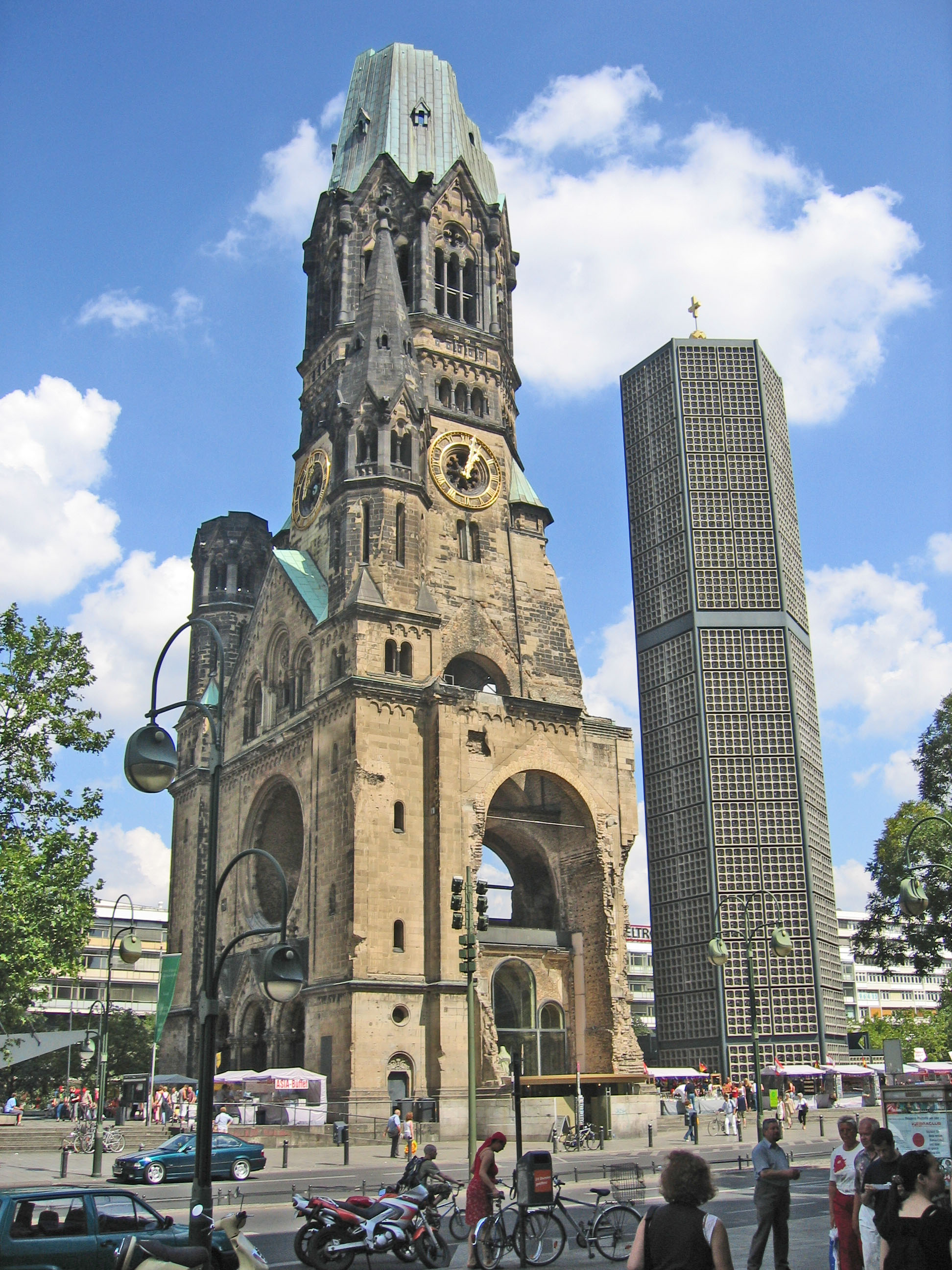
Church ruin in 2004

The Kaiser Wilhelm Church was ordered to be constructed by Kaiser Wilhelm II, as he desired a church in memorial of his grandfather, Wilhelm I. Wilhelm II thought that the construction of this church would counter what he saw as the godlessness of the Socialist and Labour movements. Architect Franz Schwechten designed the church in a Neo-Romanesque style with several towers. At the time of its construction, the main church tower was the tallest structure in Berlin, being over 113 metres tall. Construction began in 1891, and ended in 1895. The church was consecrated on 1 September 1895.

In November 1943, the Kaiser Wilhelm Church was largely destroyed in a bombing raid, and it was largely left in this state, until March 1957. That month, the architect Egon Eiermann won a competition to redesign the church. Eiermann wanted to completely demolish the church and replace it with a new building. This plan faced backlash, and as a result Eiermann agreed to a compromise where the partially destroyed around 68 metre tall corpus of the church tower would be preserved as a war memorial. Builders would then construct new buildings, including an octagonal nave, a hexagonal bell tower, a square chapel, and a foyer. The rebuilt church was re-consecrated on 17 December 1961.

The church has undergone numerous restorations, all of which kept the spire in disrepair as a memento of the destruction of World War Two. The spire's post-bombing appearance led to Berliners nicknaming it the "Hohle Zahn", meaning "Hollow Tooth" or "Cavity". The nickname also makes reference to the German royal family, as it sounds similar to the name Hohenzollern.

=== 25hours Hotel ===
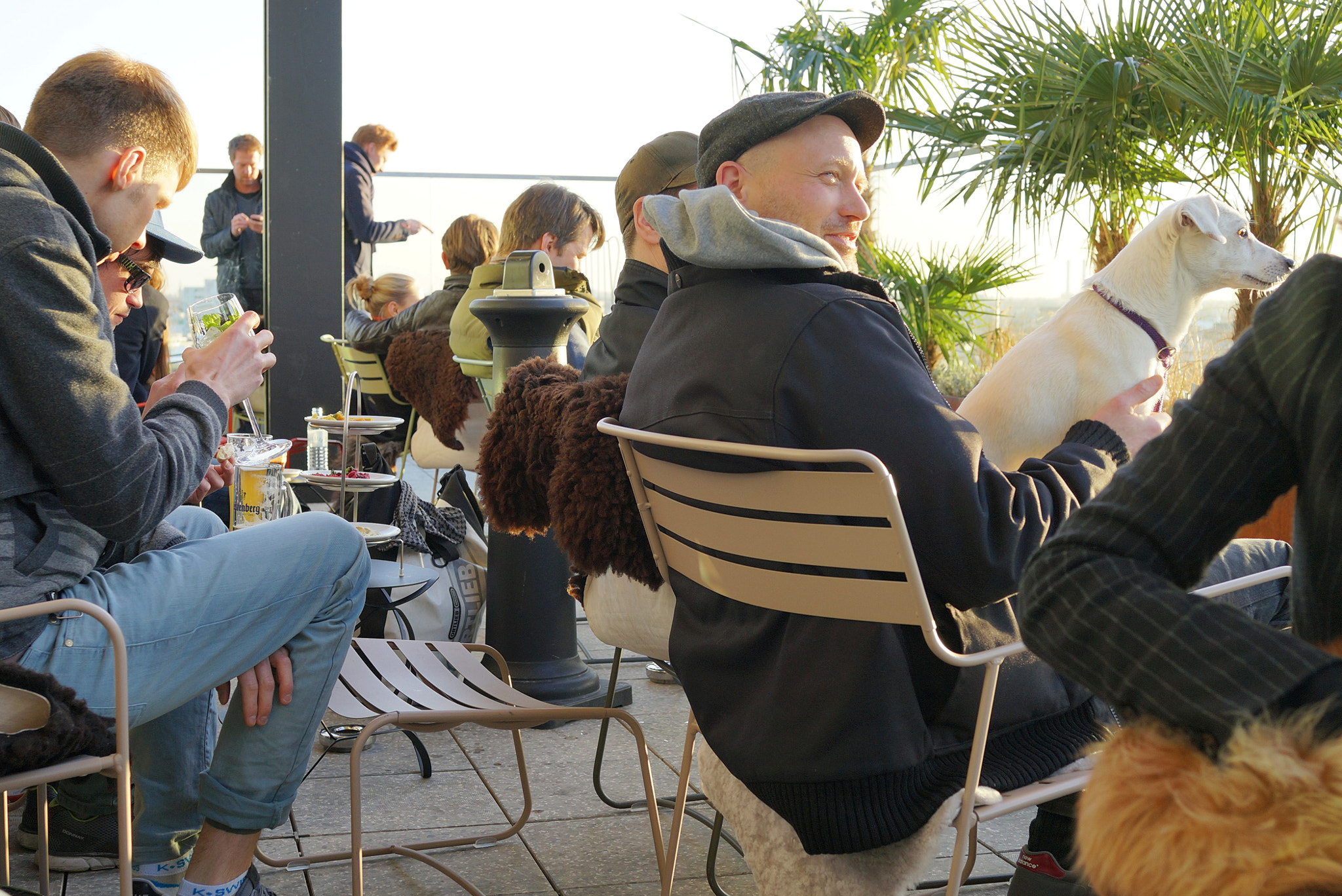
The Monkey Bar atop the 25hours Hotel

The 25hours Hotel is a four star high-rise hotel that opened in summer 2014. It has 149 rooms.

The hotel underwent on-and-off renovations by the Berlin-based Studio Aisslinger, owned by Werner Aisslinger, that began when it opened and ended in summer 2025. As part of the renovations, bathtubs were fitted with Bluetooth speakers and all large rooms were given their own library.

On top of the 25hours Hotel is the 1000-square metre "Monkey Bar", a bar and restaurant with a view of the monkey exhibition of the Berlin Zoo, hence the name. In 2014, visitors to the Monkey Bar reported that the bathrooms had floor to ceiling windows, allowing people below to see them. The hotel put up a warning sign that read—"Please be careful, not only the monkeys are watching."

== Gallery ==
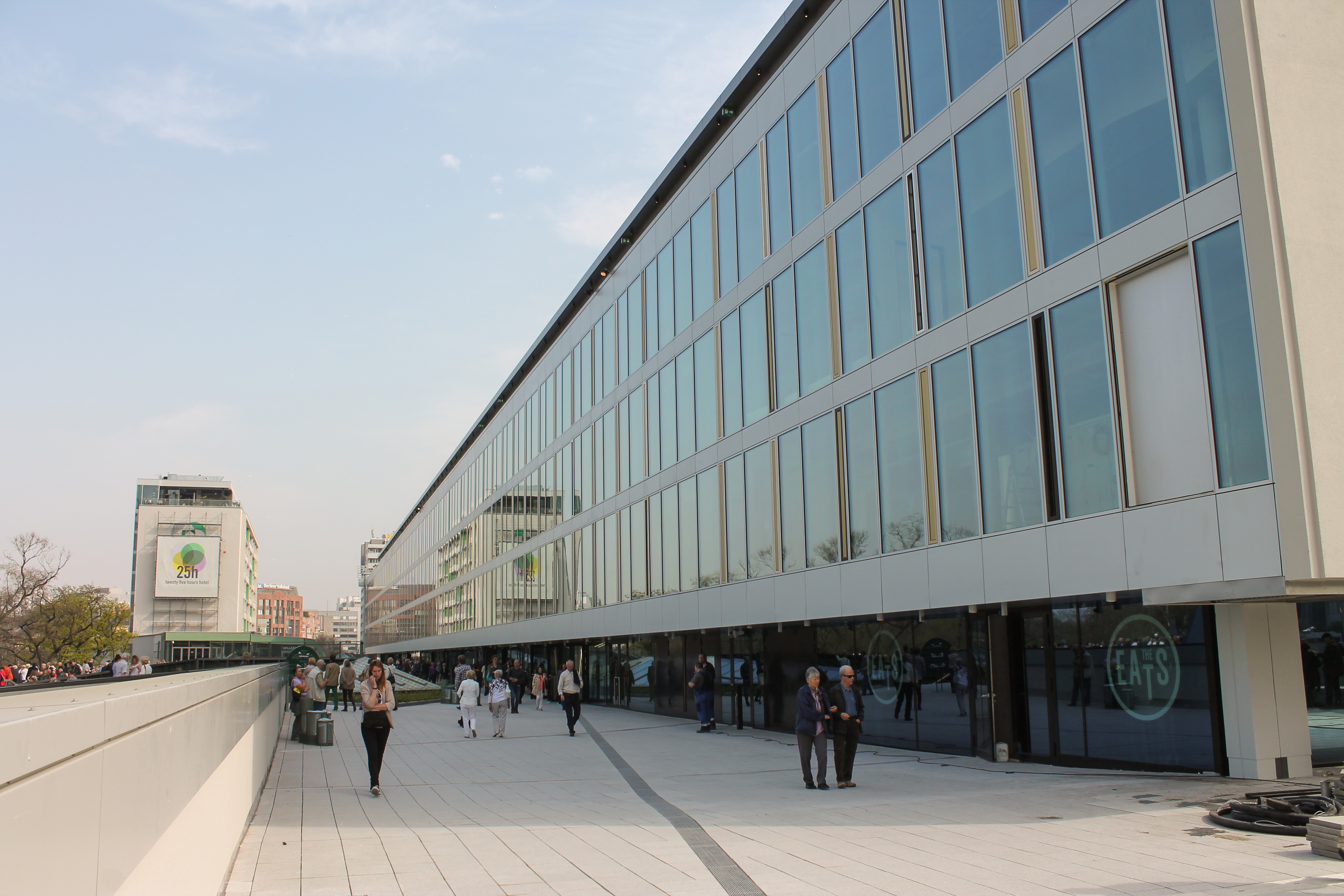
25hours Hotel

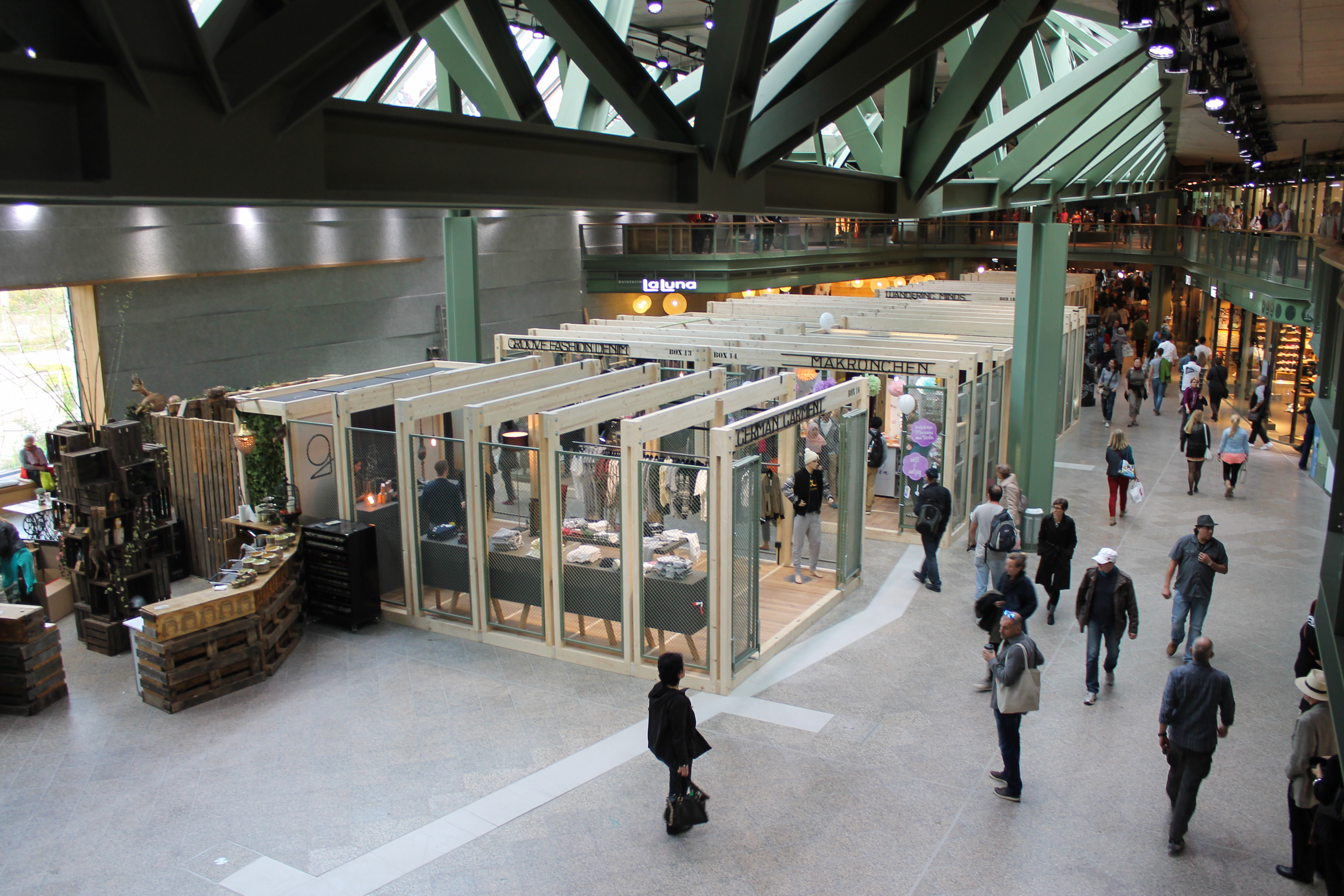
Inside the Bikini Berlin Shopping-Mall

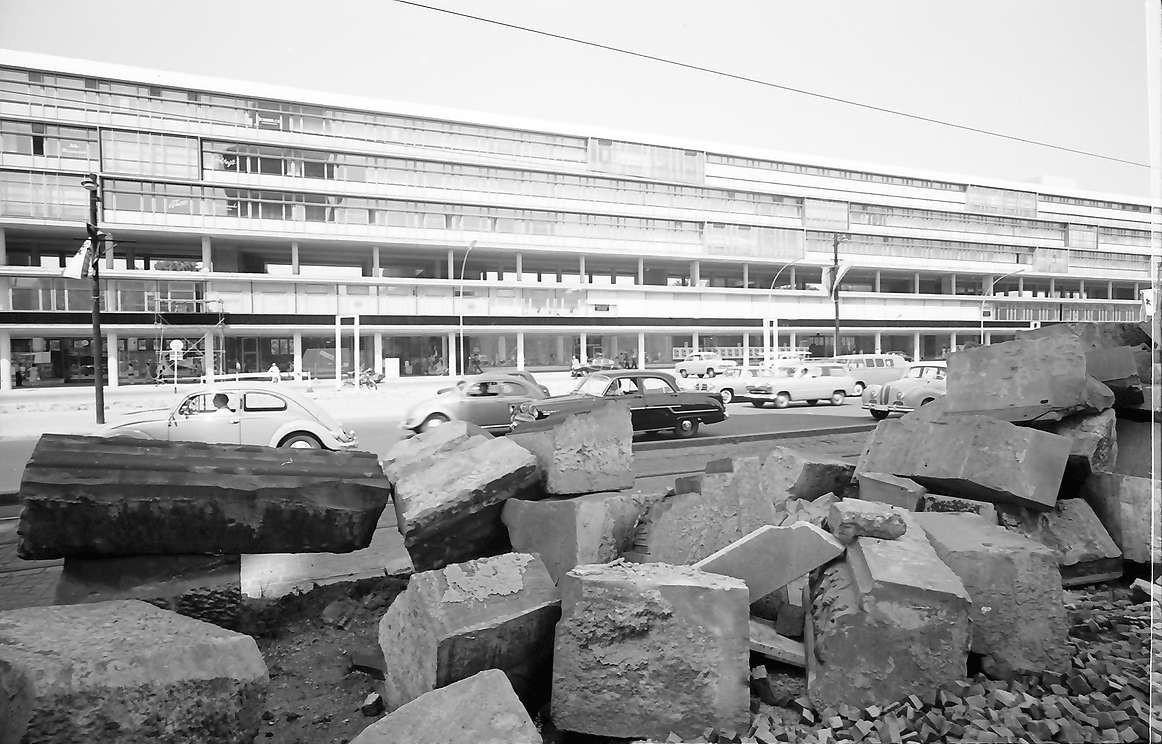
Southern facade of the Bikini-Haus shortly after completion; the open "bikini floor" is clearly visible.

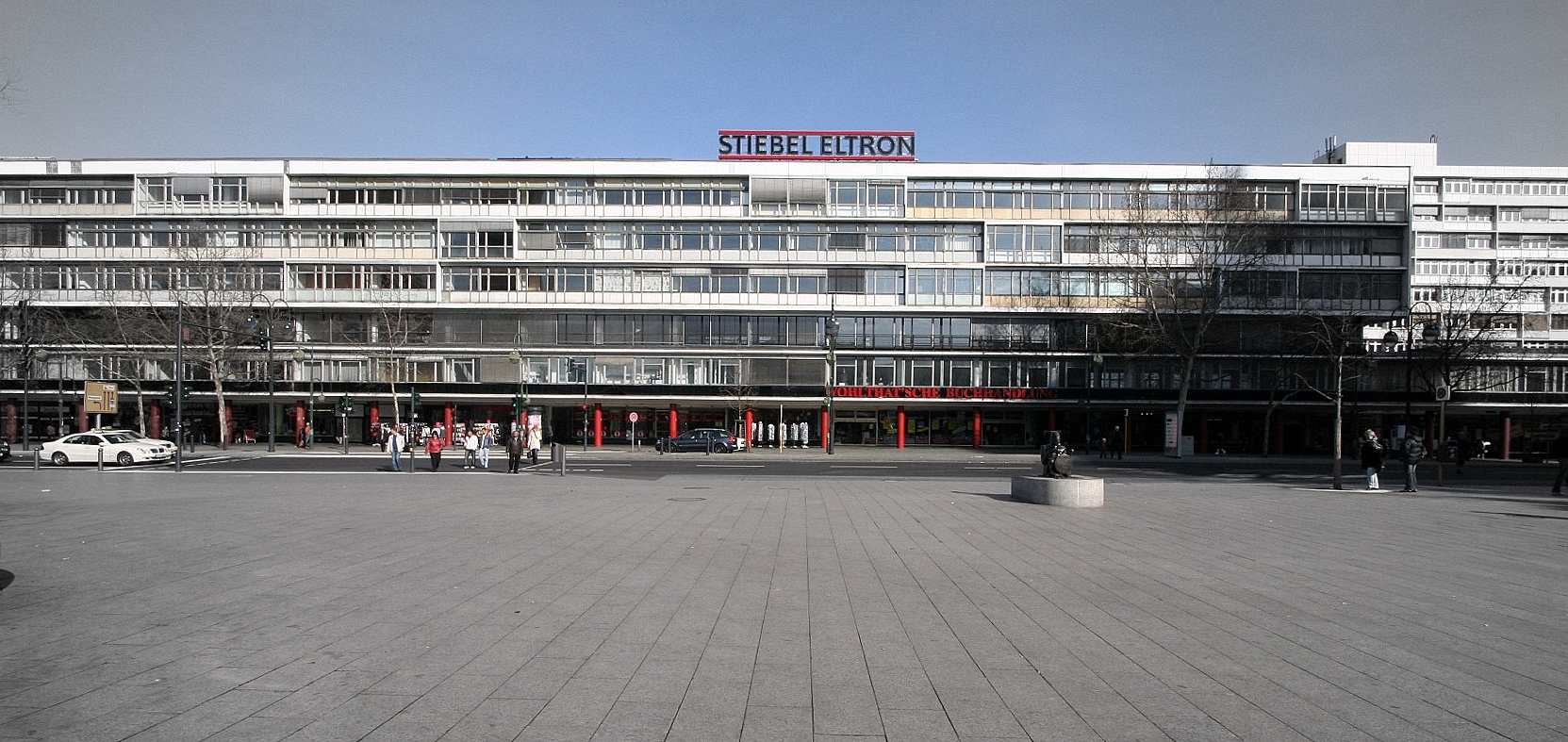
Southern facade before renovation

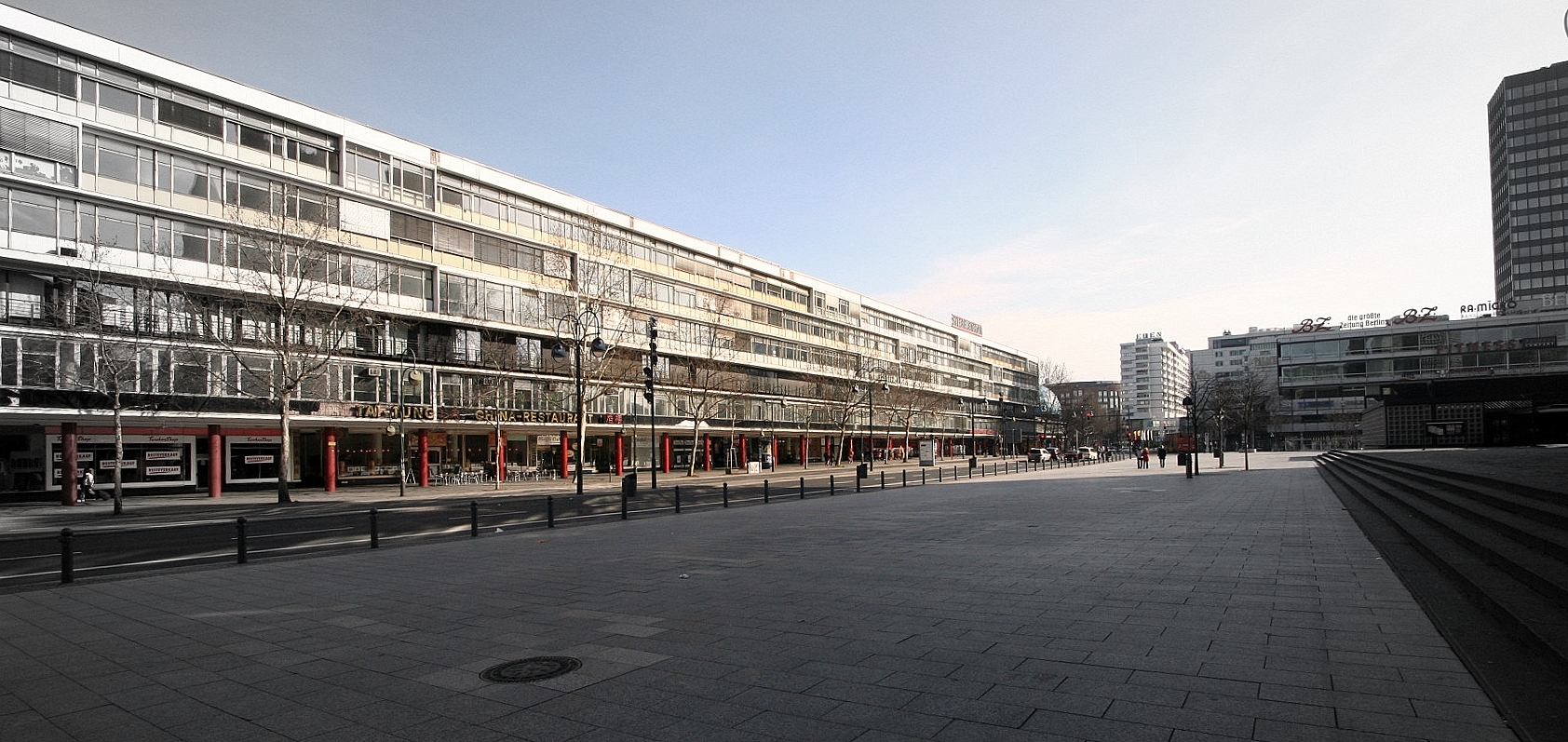
In front of the building is Breitscheidplatz and to the right is the Europa-Center.

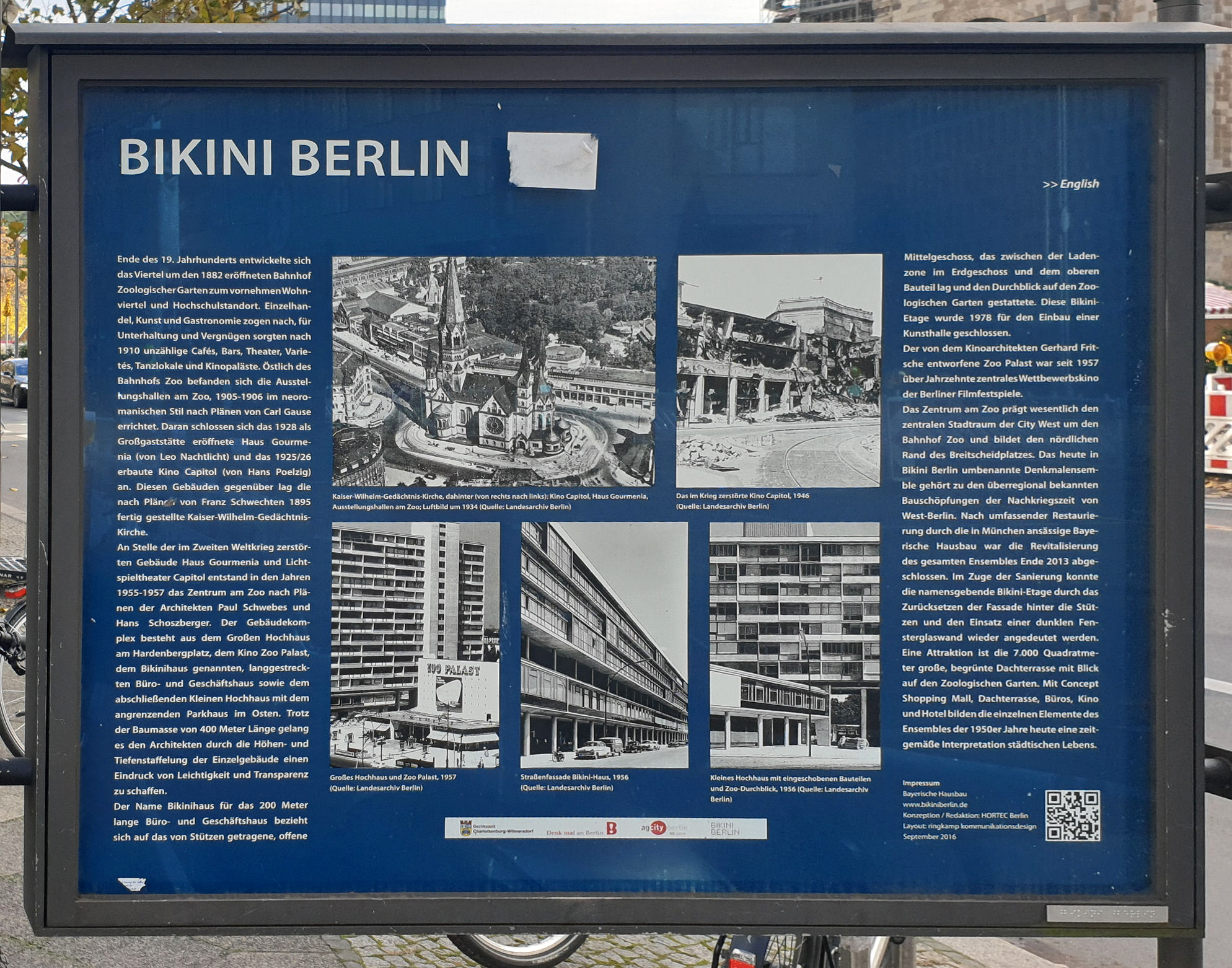
Memorial plaque on Budapest Street

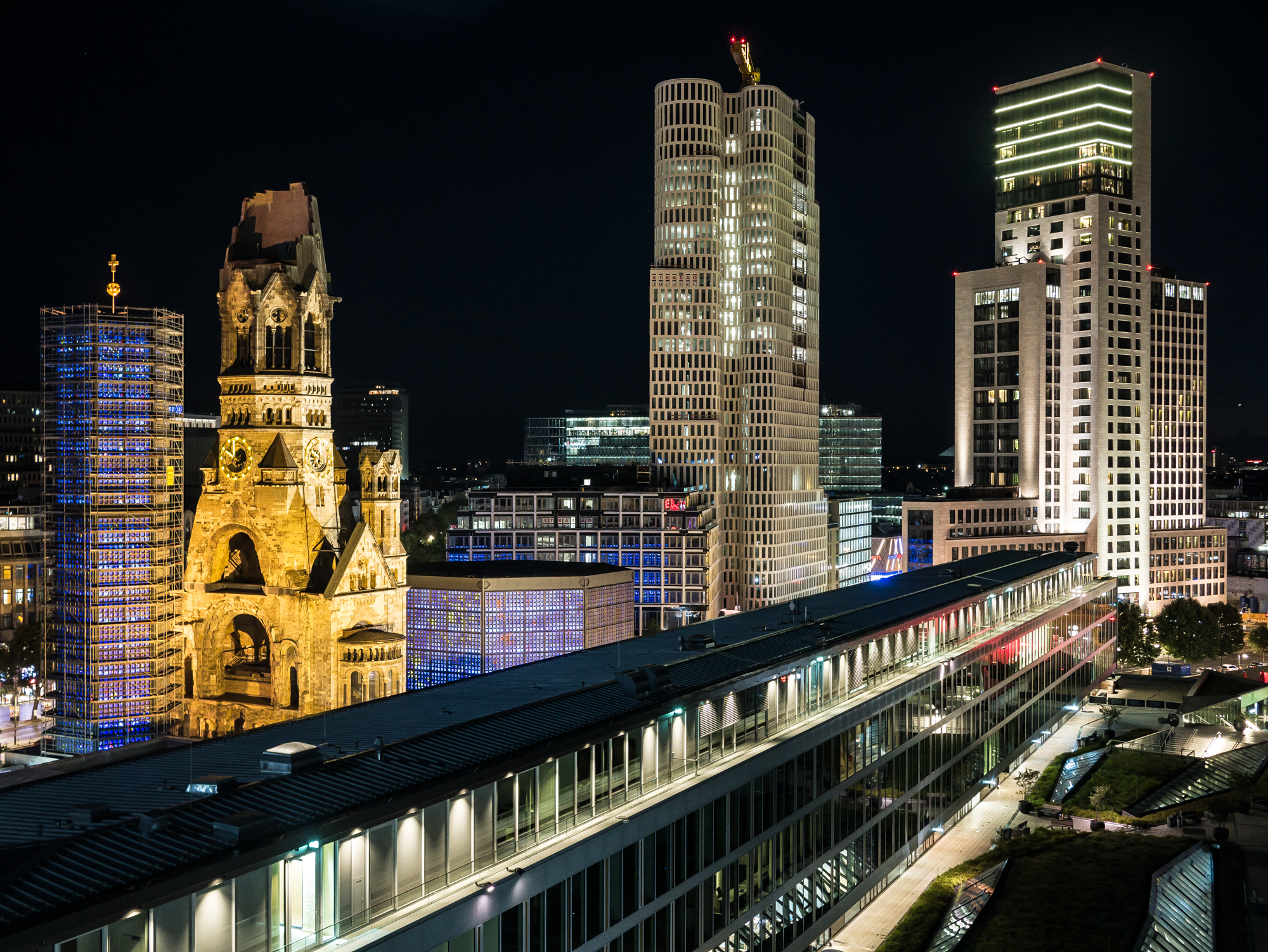
Bikini-Haus in the foreground, Kaiser Wilhelm Memorial Church on the left, Upper West in the middle, Zoofenster skyscraper on the right

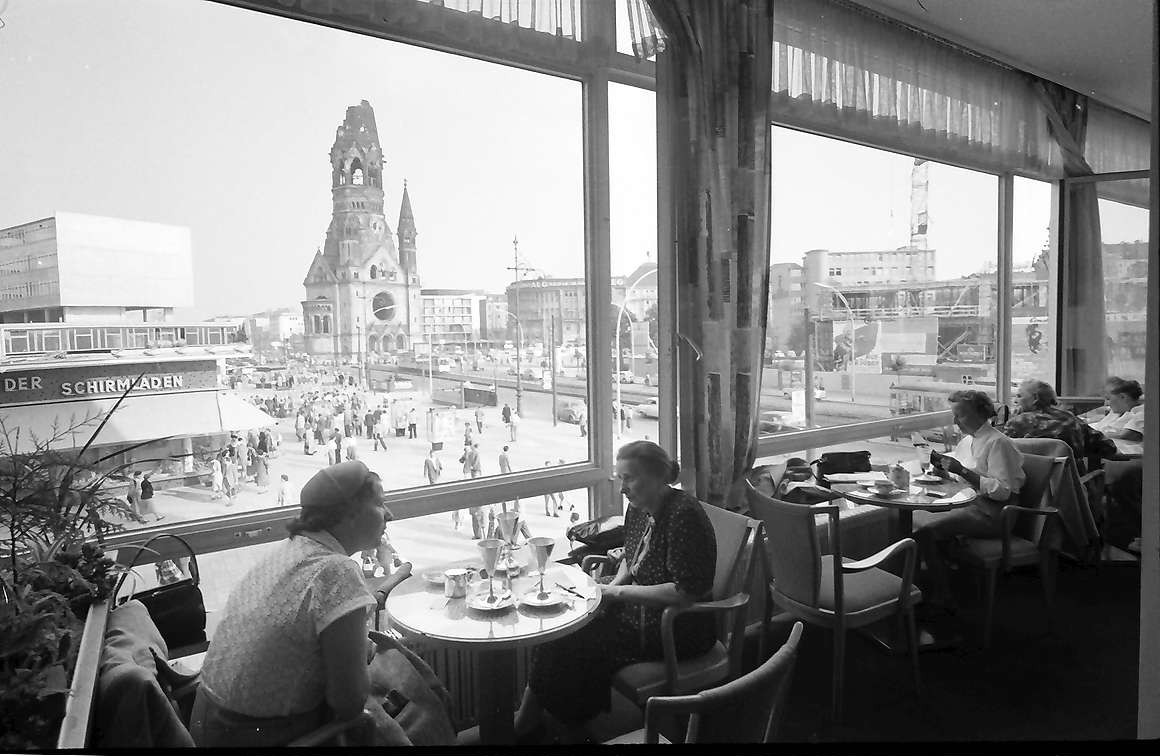
Café Huthmacher interior in 1957, with the Bikini-Haus and the Kaiser Wilhelm Memorial Church in the background
