= The Lambeth Walk =

Song from the 1937 musical Me and My Girl

Song
- Released: 1937
- Genre: Show tune
- Composer: Noel Gay
- Lyricists: Douglas Furber, L. Arthur Rose

"The Lambeth Walk" is a song from the 1937 musical Me and My Girl (with book and lyrics by Douglas Furber and L. Arthur Rose and music by Noel Gay). The song takes its name from a local street, Lambeth Walk, once notable for its street market and working-class culture in Lambeth, an area of London. The tune gave its name to a Cockney dance made popular in 1937 by Lupino Lane.

The story line of Me and My Girl concerns a Cockney barrow boy who inherits an earldom but almost loses his Lambeth girlfriend in the process. It was turned into a 1939 film The Lambeth Walk which starred Lane.

== Dance craze ==
Schichlegruber Doing the Lambeth Walk, a 1942 British propaganda film in which Nazis are made to look as though they are doing the dance.

The choreography from the musical, in which the song was a show-stopping Cockney-inspired extravaganza, inspired a popular walking dance, performed in a jaunty strutting style. Lane explained the origin of the dance as follows:

I got the idea from my personal experience and from having worked among cockneys. I'm a cockney born and bred myself. The Lambeth Walk is just an exaggerated idea of how the cockney struts.

When the stage show had been running for a few months, C. L. Heimann, managing director of the Locarno Dance Halls, got one of his dancing instructors, Adele England, to elaborate the walk into a dance. "Starting from the Locarno Dance Hall, Streatham, the dance-version of the Lambeth Walk swept the country." The craze reached Buckingham Palace, with King George VI and Queen Elizabeth attending a performance and joining in the shouted "Oi" which ends the chorus.

A well-known picture by photographer Bill Brandt's is "Dancing the Lambeth Walk", showing a line of teenage girls laughing as one of their number, in borrowed high heels, dances jauntily, her right hand blurred in motion. Originally published in 1943 in the magazine Picture Post, it is one of four by Brandt that appeared in The Family of Man, in a section on childhood, and in the accompanying book catalogue.

Mass Observation devoted a chapter of their book Britain (1939) to the craze.

The dance then spread across America, and to Paris and Prague.

=== United States ===
The fad reached the United States in 1938, popularized by Boston-based orchestra-leader Joseph (Joe) Rines, among others. Rines and his band frequently performed in New York, and the dance became especially popular at the "better" night clubs.

As with most dance crazes, other well-known orchestras did versions of the song, including Duke Ellington's. Both Russ Morgan and Duke Ellington had hit records of the song in the United States.

=== Nazi Germany ===
In Germany, big band leader Adalbert Lutter made a German-language adaptation called Lambert's Nachtlokal that quickly became popular in swing clubs. A member of the Nazi Party drew attention to it in 1939 by declaring The Lambeth Walk "Jewish mischief and animalistic hopping", as part of a speech on how the "revolution of private life" was one of the next big tasks of National Socialism in Germany.

In 1942, Charles A. Ridley of the Ministry of Information made a short propaganda film, Schichlegruber [sic] Doing the Lambeth Walk, which edited existing footage – including comical 'backstepping' – taken from Leni Riefenstahl's Triumph of the Will to make it appear as if they were goose-stepping and skipping to "The Lambeth Walk". The propaganda film was distributed uncredited to newsreel companies, which would supply their own narration.

However, the song continued to be popular with the German public and was even played on the radio, particularly during the war, as part of the vital task of maintaining public morale.

=== Fascist Italy ===
In Italy, the song was popularized by Dino Di Luca and the Trio Lescano in an Italian version titled Balliamo il passo Lambeth.

In the 1970s, the song Lambeth walk was recorded in French by the French-Italian singer Dalida.

== Cultural impact ==
"The Lambeth Walk" had the distinction of being the subject of a headline in The Times in October 1938: "While dictators rage and statesmen talk, all Europe dances – to The Lambeth Walk."

In the film The Longest Day (1962), about the Allied invasion of Normandy in June 1944, this song is sung by glider troopers of Major John Howard in a glider on its way to capture Pegasus Bridge.

The composer Franz Reizenstein, while in the internment camp on the Isle of Man in July 1940, as Hans Gál records, performed a 'party piece'; a set of Variations on the Lambeth Walk, each variation a pastiche of the style of a major classical composer. Notable are the variations in the styles of Beethoven, Chopin, and Liszt. Reizenstein premiered the composition at the Royal Albert Hall on 17 July 1958.

== 1899 song by Alec Hurley ==
An earlier, different song titled "The Lambeth Walk" (composed in 1899 by Edward W. Rogers) was popularised by music hall singer Alec Hurley (1871–1913).
