= Schichlegruber Doing the Lambeth Walk =

1942 film

- Directed by: Charles A. Ridley
- Production company: Spectator Short Films
- Release date: 1941
- Running time: 2 minutes
- Country: United Kingdom
- Language: English

Schichlegruber Doing the Lambeth Walk is a 1942 British short propaganda film by Charles A. Ridley for the UK Ministry of Information. It comprises edited existing footage taken from Leni Riefenstahl's film Triumph of the Will (1935) to make it appear as if soldiers were dancing to the dance style "The Lambeth Walk".

The film was distributed uncredited to newsreel companies.

== Alternative titles ==
The film has many alternative titles:

- Germany Calling
- Germany Calling: The Lambeth Walk
- Passegiata Lambeth
- Hoch der Lambeth Valk
- Hitler Assumes Command
- The Lambeth Walk
- Hoch Der Lambeth Walk
- Hoch der Lambeth Valk: A Laugh-Time Interlude
- Lambeth Walk – Nazi Style
- Hitler Doing the Lambeth Walk
- Gen. Adolf Takes Over
- Panzer Ballet

== Background ==
"The Lambeth Walk" was becoming popular in Berlin. In a speech that achieved attention in 1939, a speech about "revolution of private life" (one of the next big tasks of National Socialism in Germany), a member of the Nazi Party declared it "Jewish mischief and animalistic hopping".

The name "Schichlegruber" derives from Adolf Hitler's father Alois Hitler, who was illegitimate and originally named Alois Schicklgruber after his mother, Maria Schicklgruber.

== Reception ==
The Public Domain Review co-founder Adam Green claimed that the film was once screened to Joseph Goebbels, who allegedly ran out of a screening room in anger after watching the film, kicking furniture and yelling profanities while doing so. This claim was also published on the website of The Public Domain Review.

The film was weaponized by members of the Danish resistance, who would raid theatres and force the projectionists to show the film among others.

As a humorous mashup that satirizes its original footage, the film shares similarities to 21st-century remix culture, particularly that of the post-2006 YouTube poop.
