= Walter Frentz =

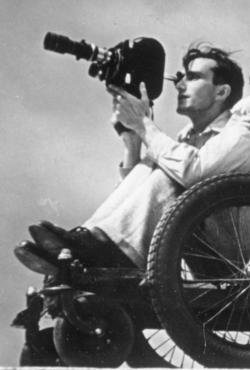
- Walter Frentz filming the 1936 Summer Olympics for the film "Olympia" in Olympiastadion assisted by both Leni Riefenstahl and a crew. (See original picture below)
- Born: 21 August 1907; Heilbronn, Kingdom of Württemberg, German Empire
- Died: 6 July 2004 (aged 96); Überlingen, Baden-Württemberg, Germany
- Military career
- Allegiance: Nazi Germany
- Branch: Luftwaffe
- Service years: 1938–1945
- Rank: Oberleutnant
- Conflicts: World War II
- Other work: Film Photographer

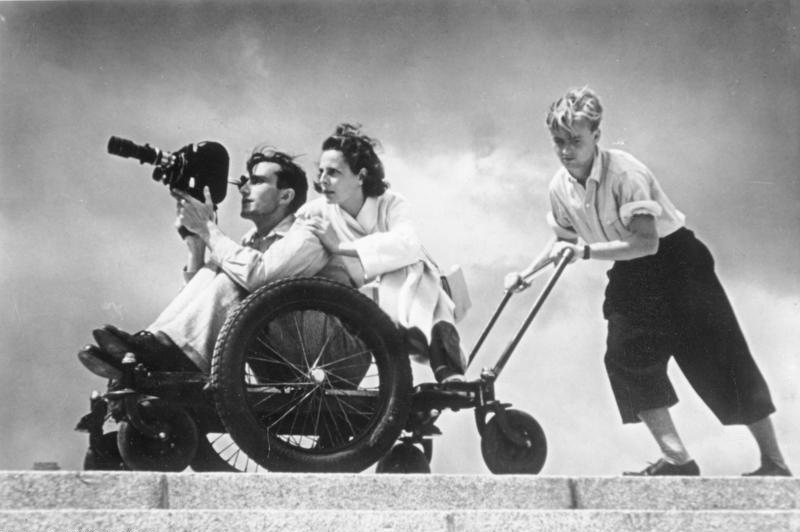

Walter Frentz (German: [ˈvaltɐ ˈfʁɛnts]; 21 August 1907 – 6 July 2004) was a German cameraman, film producer and photographer, who was considerably involved in the picture propaganda of Nazi Germany

== Biography ==
Frentz was born at Heilbronn. During the Nazi regime in Germany, he worked as a cameraman for Leni Riefenstahl; from 1939 to 1945, he was closely associated with photographing and filming activities of higher echelons of leaders of Nazi Germany, including German dictator Adolf Hitler. He was with Hitler in the Führerbunker until 24 April 1945.

At the beginning of 1945, Frentz began to photograph German cities destroyed by the war in color: Berlin, Dresden, Frankfurt am Main, Freiburg, Heilbronn, Cologne, Munich, Nuremberg, Paderborn, Ulm. At the end of March 1945, Frentz took the last film footage of Hitler, which is now among his most famous images: Hitler awards child soldiers in the courtyard of the New Reich Chancellery. On April 24, 1945, Frentz left Berlin and spent the last days of the war in the Obersalzberg.

In 1945/46, Frentz was twice interned by the Americans for short periods. His lack of fame soon enabled him to pursue a career as a cultural filmmaker and traveling lecturer without being disturbed. He gave slide presentations at adult education centers until the 1990s. However, he was unable to repeat his pre-war successes.

His film work after 1945 was of rather marginal importance; he made tourism films for the DJH (“Look in the country”), educational and information films for federal ministries (“That's how it should be, the pig”) and again kayak films. Since the 1960s, various authors (including John Toland, David Irving, Gitta Sereny) have interviewed him as a contemporary witness. Around this time, he also began to market his pictures from the Nazi era on a smaller scale. The growing interest in color photography from the “Third Reich” then led to an increased use of his photographs in German and foreign print media in the 1990s. The images were used for serious publications and press products, as well as being widely received and used in right-wing and right-wing extremist circles.

The German Canoe Association awarded Frentz the "Silver DKV Badge of Honour" at the 1977 German Canoe Day in Recklinghausen.

Frentz married the widow Edeltrude Esser in 1949 and became stepfather to her four children. The marriage produced another son in 1953. He died at Überlingen in 2004.
