= Leni Riefenstahl: Her Dream of Africa =

2003 German documentary film

- Directed by: Ray Müller
- Written by: Ray Müller
- Starring: Leni Riefenstahl; Michael Degen; Franziska Petri; Suzanne von Borsody
- Release date: 2003
- Running time: 59 minutes
- Language: German

Leni Riefenstahl: Her Dream of Africa (Leni Riefenstahl: Ihr Traum von Afrika) is a 2003 documentary-film by Ray Müller. The film follows Leni Riefenstahl's return to Sudan to visit the Nuba tribe whom she published photographs of in best-sellers such as The Last of the Nuba and The People of Kau. It is the second collaboration between Riefenstahl and Müller. She was the subject of his acclaimed 1993 documentary The Wonderful, Horrible Life of Leni Riefenstahl, which followed her life and reflected on her Nuba activities.

== Synopsis ==
At the age of 97 Riefenstahl returns to Sudan for one final farewell to the Nuba that she lived with for 8 months and photographed and filmed extensively. Müller documents her return after 23 years away and her reaction to the collapse of the culture that she once celebrated so avidly in her photographs.

== Production history ==
During the production, Riefenstahl was involved in a helicopter crash that prompted international headlines. The aircraft made a forced landing at El Obeid, 350 km southwest of the Sudanese capital, Khartoum, when returning from the Nuba mountains in central Sudan. Riefenstahl sustained two broken ribs and was repatriated to Germany for medical care along with her companion, Horst Kettner who was also injured. Riefenstahl had ignored security advice that advised her not to go the mountains to photograph Nuba wrestlers.

Riefenstahl spoke to Reuters news agency a month prior to her accident; "Of course at my age it is not so easy and perhaps not completely without risk," and that "My only goal is to find my Nuba friends again, and above all try to find a way to help them."
