= Leni Riefenstahl's Memoiren =

1987 autobiography by Leni Riefenstahl

Leni Riefenstahl: Memoiren
- First edition cover in Germany
- Author: Leni Riefenstahl
- Language: English (translated), German
- Genre: Autobiography
- Publisher: Auflage (Germany); St Martins Press (1993) (US); Quartet (UK) (1992)
- Publication date: 1987
- Publication place: Germany
- English publication date: 1992
- Media type: Print (Hardback & Paperback)
- Pages: 928 (German), 668 (English)
- ISBN: 3-8228-0834-2
- OCLC: 64433013
- Preceded by: Mein Afrika
- Followed by: Wunder unter Wasser

Leni Riefenstahl's Memoiren is the 1987 autobiography of German film director Leni Riefenstahl.

Editions of the book also appear as The Sieve of Time: The Memoirs of Leni Riefenstahl (UK) and Leni Riefenstahl: A Memoir (US).

== Overview ==
Riefenstahl recounts her life as the foremost film director of the Third Reich who directed films such as Triumph of the Will and Olympia. She also deals with her post-war life, and the stigma of her past that thwarted future productions. She accounts for her acclaimed career as a photographer, notably that of Sudan's Nuba tribe recounted in The Last of the Nuba and other publications. The book also includes memoirs of her underwater marine explorations and her photography which had been published as Coral Gardens.

== Reception ==
The book garnered a positive critical reception. Notably, it was featured in the New York Times list of Notable Books of the Year 1993. Writing in The New York Times Book Review, John Simon said the memoir did not contain "a single unspellbinding page." Although he questioned some of the veracity of her accounts, he concluded "The book must, in the main, be true; it is far too weird for fiction."

== Release ==
The book received a 1993 American release and coincided with the release of the acclaimed documentary The Wonderful, Horrible Life of Leni Riefenstahl, as well as Riefenstahl's ninetieth birthday. It was featured on the 1993 New York Times list of notable books of the year.
