= Riefenstahl (film) =

2024 film by Andres Veiel

- Theatrical release poster
- Directed by: Andres Veiel
- Written by: Andres Veiel
- Produced by: Sandra Maischberger
- Cinematography: Toby Cornish
- Edited by: Stephan Krumbiegel; Olaf Voigtländer; Alfredo Castro
- Music by: Freya Arde
- Release dates: 29 August 2024 (Venice); 31 October 2024 (Germany)
- Running time: 115 minutes
- Country: Germany
- Languages: German; English; French
- Box office: $245,837

Riefenstahl is a 2024 German documentary film written and directed by Andres Veiel about the actress and filmmaker Leni Riefenstahl.

The film premiered on 29 August 2024 at the Venice International Film Festival and was theatrically released in Germany on 31 October 2024. It received acclaim from critics.

== Summary ==
The film explores her artistic legacy alongside her ties to the Nazi regime with archival evidence to prove her awareness of said regime's atrocities.

== Background ==
Sandra Maischberger interviewed filmmaker Leni Riefenstahl in 2002 to mark the centenary of her birth. The director of the interview was Hans-Jürgen Panitz, who won an Emmy in 1993 for his documentary The Wonderful, Horrible Life of Leni Riefenstahl. Sandra's interview with Leni was broadcast simultaneously in Germany and France on Arte on August 15, 2002, under the title Sandra Maischberger meets Leni Riefenstahl. Maischberger later commented on the interview: "in the middle, I thought she was lying" and "I hadn't been able to get anything out of her. And I thought that couldn't have been it". She then delved deeper into Riefenstahl's life and, as she told the newspaper Der Tagesspiegel, the idea for a documentary was born.

In 2016, Riefenstahl's heirs handed over her estate to the Prussian Cultural Heritage Foundation, which included 7,000 boxes of scripts, letters, notes, film excerpts, photographs, private super 8 recordings, cassette tapes with telephone recordings and various drafts for her memoirs, all disorganized. Maischberger offered the foundation a careful inventory of the estate, carried out by experts. In return, she received permission to use the material for the production of a documentary. In 2018, documentary filmmaker Andres Veiel joined the project with his team of editors, who had been involved in visualizing the material from the beginning, and cameraman Toby Cornish.

The director filled in the gaps in Riefenstahl's self-portrait with additional sources. For example, Riefenstahl's statement that she had never read Adolf Hitler's Mein Kampf was refuted by an interview published in the British newspaper Daily Express in April 1934, in which she said that she had bought a copy of the book in a bookshop on the way to filming The Blue Light. She told the British tabloid "take the book with you. At every break in filming. On the train. On the water. In the forest. After the first page, I'm already a convinced National Socialist". This interview is not included in the estate organized by his family, but was still available in the newspaper's archive in England.

=== Production ===
The film was produced by Sandra Maischberger and her production company Vincent Productions, in co-production with WDR, SWR, NDR, BR and rbb. The production was financed by Film- und Medienstiftung NRW, Medienboard Berlin-Brandenburg, Filmförderungsanstalt, Federal Government Commissioner for Culture and the Media and Deutsches Filmorchester Babelsberg.

Stephan Krumbiegel and Olaf Voigtländer, with whom Veiel had already worked on his documentary about Joseph Beuys, and Alfredo Castro took part in the editing of the film. The documentary was edited over a period of eighteen months. Toby Cornish was responsible for the camera work, just as he was for the documentary about Joseph Beuys.

The music for the film was written by Freya Arde, who managed to record the compositions with the Deutsches Filmorchester Babelsberg.

In an interview, Veiel said that the documentary warns of the rise of the far-right in the contemporary world. Veiel pointed out that "in the last conversation Leni has on the phone in the movie, she says that it will take one or two generations for Germany to rediscover its role in terms of morality, virtue and order. That's not too far removed from Donald Trump and what he says about immigrants spoiling American blood. It was a darkly prophetic conversation".

== Exhibition ==
The film was shown for the first time at the Venice Film Festival on August 29, 2024. It premiered in German cinemas on October 31, 2024. (Riefenstahl herself was honored several times at the Venice Film Festival. In 1932, she was awarded the silver medal for The Blue Light; in 1934, the gold medal for Triumph of the Will; and, in 1938, the gold medal of the Coppa Mussolini for best foreign film for Olympia.)

In North America, the premiere took place at the Telluride Film Festival, in the town in the interior of Colorado, where Riefenstahl received the prize of honor at the first festival in 1974.

AWARDS

05.09.2024 – Best movie - Cinema & Arts Award, Venice

14.09.2024 – Cine Docs Prize - CineFest Miskolc International Film Festival, Hungary

27.09.2024 – Grand Jury Prize – 14. Film Festival Valenciennes

28.09.2024 – Winner Gold Award - Spotlight Documentary Award

29.09.2024 – Youth Jury Favorite 2024 - Filmkunstmesse Leipzig 2024

29.09.2024 – Best Documentary 2024 - Gilde Filmpreis of AG Kino-Gilde

09.01.2025 – Best Documentary - “Michel Ciment” Pessac Film Festival, France

19.02.2025 – Best Documentary - Dublin International Film Festival

23.02.2025 – Jury Prize - Atlanta Jewish Film Festival

14.04.2025 – Best Documentary - German Film Awards (Nomination)

19.04.2025 – Fire Bird Arward - Jury Prize, Hong Kong

14.10.2025 – European Film, European Doc - European Film Award (Nomination)

14.10.2025 – Best Documentary Feature, Best Archival Documentary, Best Historical Documentary - Critics Choice Awards (Nomination)

=== Critical reception ===
German film journalist Dieter Oßwald wrote on the Programmkino.de portal: "A meticulously compiled and exciting puzzle of a contradictory biography. 'Visionary? Manipulator? Liar?' the poster asks programmatically. As always, Veiel wisely leaves the answers to the audience. A milestone in biographical filmmaking. At the same time, an important educational film about the power of images - always topical in the age of artificial intelligence".

The American magazine The Hollywood Reporter wrote: "Andres Veiel's new documentary is a psychological portrait of the infamous director of Olympia and Triumph of the Will that shows the 'terrible seductive power' of fascism".

Jens Hinrichsen, from Monopol magazine, writes in his detailed review of the film that it once again dismantles the myth of apoliticism and brings the problem of its aesthetics to the present. The film does not view the main character from a "safe distance" but instead brings her into the present. The selected material often works as a mirror of current events. "At its core, Riefenstahl deals with a perverted concept of beauty that conceals the other side of what is beautiful, superior, and victorious — the supposedly unworthy, sick, weak, and also the foreign". In summary, Hinrichsen states that parallels can be drawn with Instagram filters, beauty mania, and body shaming from her work, which celebrates the cult of the perfect body, especially in her film Olympia". "Leni Riefenstahl may not be innocent of the fact that beauty broke away from the triad of the true, the beautiful, and the good".

Owen Gleiberman of the US magazine Variety wrote that the documentary "presents more evidence than we have seen so far that Riefenstahl was part of the regime. However, the evidence remains circumstantial".

Xan Brooks, film critic for the British newspaper The Guardian, writes that Leni Riefenstahl returns to the festival as the star of Andres Veiel's 'extraordinarily profound documentary'. "It was here in Venice that her career peaked before falling into -. The film shows this story and how Riefenstahl tried and failed to save her reputation". The film acknowledges her role as a pioneer: "an ambitious artist in a male-dominated industry whose poetic eye and technical talent turned the medium upside down [...] But the film also shows the ways in which her work is inextricably linked to Nazism - full of it, determined by it - which can never be seen in isolation as innocent and immaculate".

Thomas Schultze, from the movie portal Spot, comes to the conclusion that "Leni Riefenstahl's blindness, as Andres Veiel's film makes clear, is the blindness of an entire country that doesn't want to take responsibility, that doesn't want to learn from what happened, that prefers to look away and deny, thus opening the door to a new look at an abyss that was thought to have been overcome".

On the review aggregator website Rotten Tomatoes, 97% of 64 critics' reviews are positive. The website's consensus reads: "Organizing a treasure trove of archival materials with impressive intellectual rigor, director Andres Veiel's documentary methodically dismantles Leni Riefenstahl's self-mythologizing to offer an historically clear-eyed assessment of her legacy." On Metacritic, which uses a weighted average, the film holds a score of 82 out of 100 based on 17 critics, indicating "universal acclaim".
