= Wonders under Water =

- Author: Leni Riefenstahl
- Original title: Wunder unter Wasser
- Illustrator: Leni Riefenstahl
- Language: English (translated), German
- Genre: Illustrations
- Publisher: Herbig (Germany), Quartet Books (UK)
- Publication date: 1990
- Publication place: Germany
- English publication date: 1991
- Media type: Print (Hardback & Paperback)
- Pages: 215
- ISBN: 3-7766-1651-2
- OCLC: 231165869
- Preceded by: Leni Riefenstahl's Memoiren

Wonders under Water is the English-language title of German film director Leni Riefenstahl's 1990 Wunder unter Wasser, an illustrations book of marine life.

== Overview ==
The book is a collection of photographs taken by Riefenstahl of marine life since she began scuba diving in the 1970s.

== See also ==
- Impressionen unter Wasser
