= Photo-essay =

Form of visual storytelling

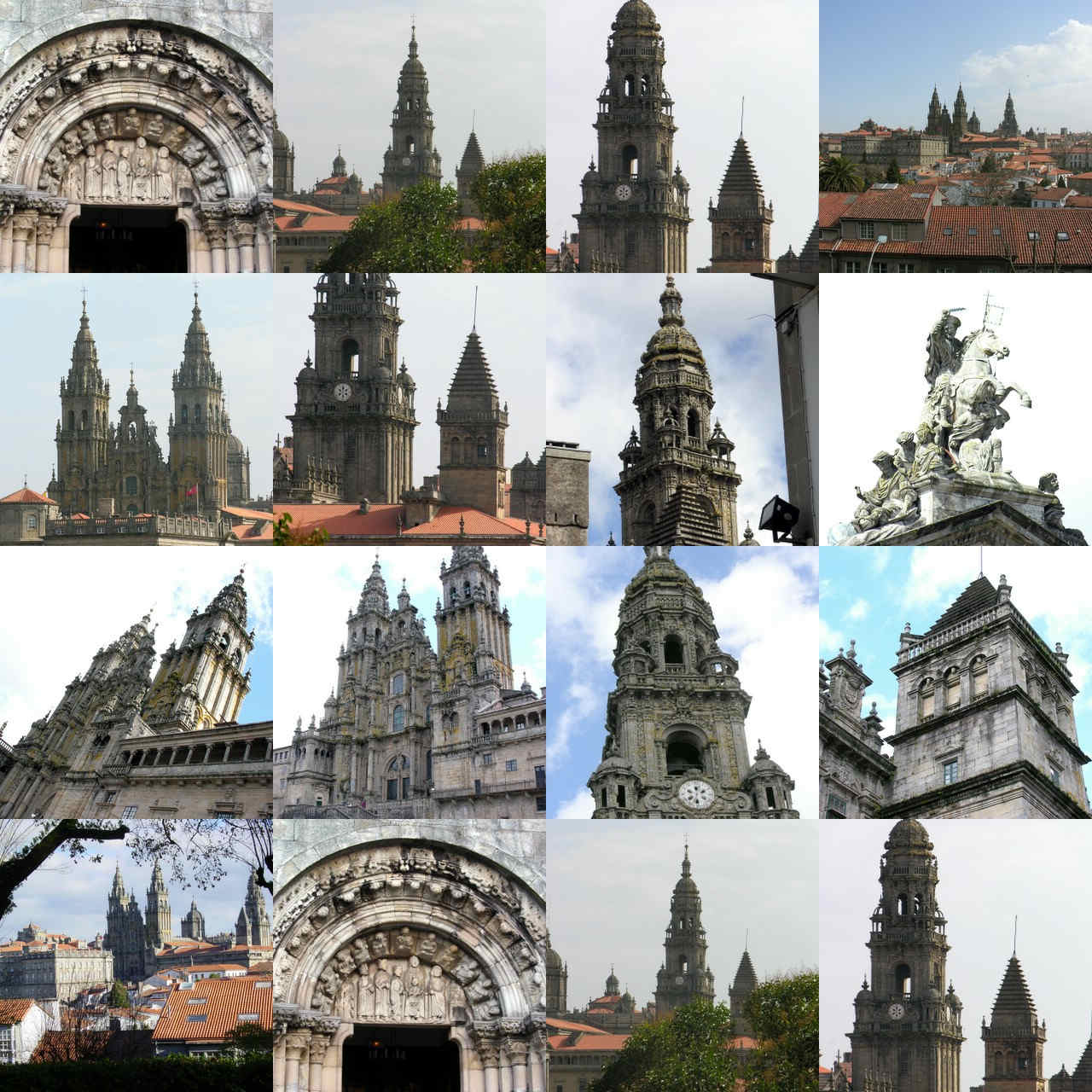
A photo collage of Santiago de Compostela

A photographic essay or photo-essay for short is a form of visual storytelling, a way to present a narrative through a series of images. A photo essay delivers a story using a series of photographs and brings the viewer along a narrative journey.

Examples of photo essays include:

- A web page or portion of a web site.
- A single montage or collage of photographic images, with text or other additions, intended to be viewed both as a whole and as individual photographs. Such a work may also fall in the category of mixed media.
- An art show which is staged at a particular time and location. Some such shows may also fall into other categories.
- In fashion publishing especially, a photo-editorial – an editorial-style article dominated by or entirely consisting of a series of thematic photographs.

Photographers known for their photo-essays include:

- Margaret Bourke-White
- W. Eugene Smith
- Ansel Adams
  - Adams's Born Free and Equal (1944) documented Japanese Americans held at the Manzanar War Relocation Center during World War II.
- Gordon Parks' A Harlem Family are acclaimed for showing a glimpse into the lives of the sick and impoverished.
- James Nachtwey
- William Klein
- Peter Funch's much-reposted photo series, for which Funch photographed the same street corner for nine years.
- Henry Grossman — known for his photographs of celebrities such as John F. Kennedy and the Beatles, Grossman published numerous photo-essays of Broadway for Life magazine.

Many photo-essays moved from printed press to the web.

== See also ==
- Charticle
- Photojournalism
- Photography
- Art
