= Coral Gardens =

English translation of Korallengärten

- First edition
- Author: Leni Riefenstahl
- Original title: Korallengärten
- Illustrator: Leni Riefenstahl
- Language: English (translated), German
- Genre: Illustrations
- Publisher: List (Germany) HarperCollins (US)
- Publication date: 1978
- Publication place: United States, Germany
- English publication date: 1978
- Media type: Print (Hardback & Paperback)
- Pages: 223
- ISBN: 0-06-013591-3
- OCLC: 4496714
- Dewey Decimal: 500.9/14/2
- LC Class: QH95.8 .R5313 1978
- Preceded by: Die Nuba von Kau
- Followed by: Mein Afrika

Coral Gardens is the title of the 1978 English-language translation of German film director Leni Riefenstahl's Korallengärten, an illustrations book published in the same year in Germany. The book was published by HarperCollins in the United States. It is the first of two book collections of underwater photographs, followed by Impressionen unter Wasser (Impressions under Water) in 1990.

== Overview ==
The book illustrations are the result of photos taken by Riefenstahl during her scuba diving trips in the Indian Ocean in the 1970s.

== See also ==
- Impressionen unter Wasser
