= Charticle =

Text, images and graphics news article

A charticle is a combination of text, images and graphics that takes the place of a full article in a newspaper or other publication. Unlike a traditional news article that usually consists of large blocks of text with occasional images or other graphics used to enhance the article's visual appeal or to convey some ancillary information, a charticle is composed primarily of an image, with text used only sparingly to provide additional information. The ratio of text to images is inverted in a charticle compared to a traditional article, essentially making it the graphic novel equivalent of a traditional news article.

== Origins ==
Claims have been made that Van McKenzie, the sports editor at the Orlando Sentinel and St. Petersburg Times, incorporated graphics with text in the 1970s. Others claim that Edward Tufte, a pioneer in information design, is behind the charticle even though he has not coined the term.

== See also ==
- Listicle
- Photo-essay
- Photo-editorial
- Infographic
