= Henry Grossman =

American photographer (1936–2022)

Henry Grossman (October 11, 1936 – November 27, 2022) was an American photographer, best known for his portraits of notable figures, in particular President John F. Kennedy and The Beatles, as well as prominent political figures, writers, and performing artists. Through much of his career he was a staff photographer for Life magazine. His photographs feature portraits that include Lyndon Johnson, Richard Nixon, Kurt Vonnegut Jr, Elizabeth Taylor, Richard Burton, Luciano Pavarotti, and Barbra Streisand.

== Early life and education ==
Henry Grossman was born in New York City, the son of Elias Grossman, a renowned Russian-born etcher, whose subjects included Mahatma Gandhi, Albert Einstein, and Benito Mussolini.

Grossman studied photography at the Metropolitan Vocational High School in New York City and completed an undergraduate degree in Theater Arts at Brandeis University in 1958. He later studied acting with Lee Strasberg. His classmates included Dustin Hoffman and Elliott Gould.

== Career ==
In his twenties, Grossman shot assignments and covers for Life magazine, The New York Times, Time magazine, Newsweek, Paris Match, and others. He was later hired as a staff photographer for Life magazine. After photographing John F. Kennedy's announcement to run for presidency, Henry travelled to photo document the Kennedy campaign. After Kennedy was elected president he became a friend of the family and was often invited to photograph at personal and private events.

In February 1964, he photographed the Beatles' American television debut performance on the Ed Sullivan Show. Subsequently, he became friends with the Beatles and spent extensive time photographing them between 1964 and 1968.

Grossman was also an opera singer and Broadway theater actor.

== Personal life and death ==
Grossman had two children who both work as professional musicians. He died of injuries sustained in a fall, on November 27, 2022, at the age of 86.

== Contributions ==
=== Photographs ===
In college, Henry Grossman photographed Eleanor Roosevelt, Marc Chagall, David Ben-Gurion, e.e. cummings, Robert Graves, John F. Kennedy on the day he announced his candidacy for presidency, Adlai Stevenson, and Henry Kissinger, among others.

Grossman's photographs include prominent political figures, in particular John F. Kennedy, Robert F. Kennedy, Ted Kennedy, Lyndon B. Johnson, Richard Nixon, artists and writers, in particular Alexander Calder, Kurt Vonnegut, Vladimir Nabokov, Rock and Roll legends, in particular the Beatles, Jimi Hendrix, Rod Stewart, and the Grateful Dead, and other performing artists, in particular Elizabeth Taylor, Richard Burton, Meryl Streep, Martha Graham, Rudolph Nureyev, Leonard Bernstein, Luciano Pavarotti, Placido Domingo, Leontyne Price, Barbra Streisand, and Thelonious Monk.

Frequently Henry worked as the official photographer for Broadway shows, with follow-up photo-essays for Life magazine.

=== Photographs of John F. Kennedy ===
Famous photographs of John F. Kennedy taken by Henry Grossman include early campaign photographs and the front-page photograph published in the New York Times when Kennedy was assassinated.

=== Photographs of The Beatles ===
Between 1964 and 1968, Henry Grossman took more than 7,000 photographs of the Beatles, most of which were not published at the time. In 2008, Kevin Ryan, Brian Kehew, and Henry Grossman published Kaleidoscope Eyes, which documents a recording session for the song "Lucy in the Sky With Diamonds". In 2012, Ryan, Kehew and Grossman then published Places I Remember, revealing more than 1000 previously unpublished photographs.

The photographs are notable for their unusual angles and candid documentation of life and events. Henry was a trusted photographer and friend, who participated in both their public and private lives. In 1967, Henry photographed the band with their guru Maharishi Mahesh Yogi in Bangor, Wales, when they learned that their manager Brian Epstein had been found dead of a drug overdose. His best-known photograph of the Beatles is a formal portrait shot for the cover of Life magazine in 1967 and also released as a poster, depicting the band with mustaches and flowery clothes.

=== Performing arts ===
Henry Grossman was a principal tenor in the New York Metropolitan Opera, and a Broadway performer, with more than 1,000 performances in Grand Hotel.

== Publications ==
Henry Grossman. 2012. Places I Remember: My Time with the Beatles. Curvebender Publishing. Introduction by Paul McCartney. ISBN 978-0978520021.

Kevin Ryan, Brian Kehew, and Henry Grossman. 2008. Kaleidoscope Eyes: A Day in the Life of Sgt. Pepper. The Photography of Henry Grossman. Curvebender Publishing. ISBN 9780978520014.

Barbara Kasten, Ellen Denuto, Go-Al Nowak, Henry Grossman, Claude Huyghens, Jorg Wischmann, Pedro Luis Raota, Hugo Lambrecht, John Isaac, Aki Hirahata. 1990. Minolta Mirror. Minolta Publishing. ASIN B000H5520G.

== See also ==
- Henry Grossman Website
- Henry Grossman Biography
