= Joyce Nakamura Okazaki =

American citizen of Japanese heritage (born 1934)

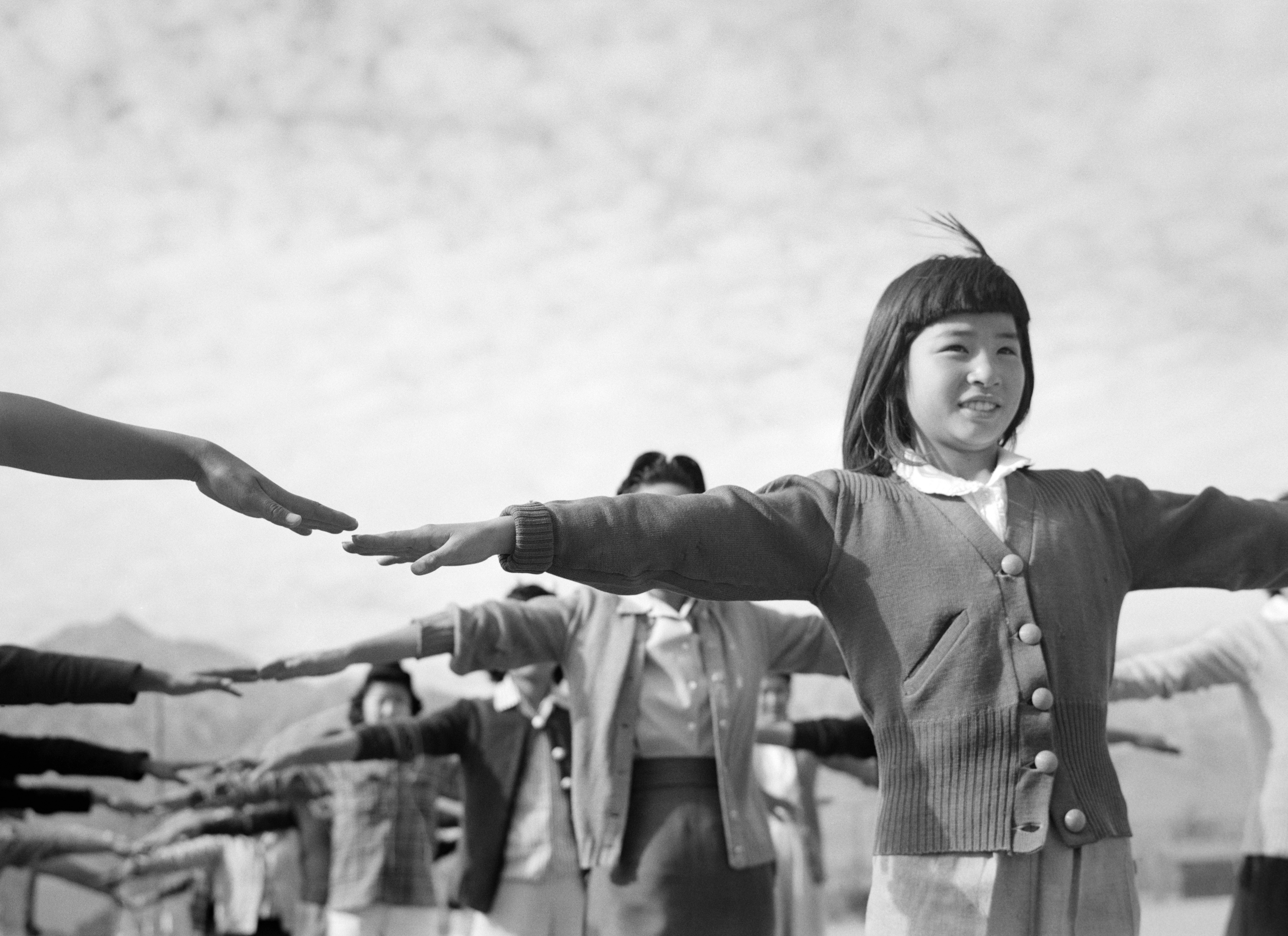
- Born: Joyce Yukiko Nakamura; July 29, 1934 (age 92); Los Angeles
- Citizenship: United States
- Known for: Manzanar Committee

Joyce Nakamura Okazaki (born July 29, 1934) is an American citizen of Japanese heritage who was forcibly removed with her family from their Los Angeles home and placed in the Manzanar War Relocation camp in 1942. She was photographed by Ansel Adams in both 1943 and 1944 for his book, Born Free and Equal: The Story of Loyal Japanese Americans. In the 2001 reprint of the book, Okazaki's photograph appeared on the book jacket cover. She was the treasurer of the Manzanar Committee, from July 2010 to February 2021, an NGO which promotes education about the World War II incarceration of Japanese-Americans.

== Biography ==
Joyce Yukiko Nakamura was born on July 29, 1934, in Los Angeles, California to parents of Japanese heritage. Her mother Yaeko Kusayanagi was a US citizen and her father, Genshiro Nakamura came to the US in 1916 when he was eleven years old. She attended school until second grade at Maryknoll School, where she studied both English and Japanese.

On April 2, 1942, after Executive Order 9066 was signed, her family was detained and taken to the camp at Manzanar, where they were imprisoned with other Japanese-Americans and lived in Manzanar for about two and a half years. During their forced detainment, Nakamura, her mother, and her younger sister were photographed by Ansel Adams. Her father was not in the photographs as he was away on the potato harvest during the 1943 photo shoot and during the second one, her father had already left camp permanently. In July 1944, her family left the camp after swearing a loyalty oath and her mother clearing an additional examination. As Kusayanagi's father had been arrested on the night of December 7, 1941, by the FBI, detained, then released after six months, she underwent additional questioning before being released. In Chicago, Nakamura attended both a parochial elementary school and a Catholic high school. She attended one year of classes at University of Illinois at Navy Pier and in 1952, Nakamura returned with her family to Los Angeles, where she attended UCLA and was in the Chi Alpha Delta sorority.

After graduating with a BS in business administration, Nakamura worked briefly at Pacific Mutual Life Insurance Company and then went to work for the Department of Employment, where she remained for thirteen years. One of her projects while she was there was to help in the rewrite of the definitions of occupations for the Dictionary of Occupational Titles. In 1962, Nakamura met another Manzanar incarceree, James Okazaki, whom she married in 1963. In the mid- 1980s Okazaki began working for the Los Alamitos Unified School District, where she served in libraries and media centers for 20 years before retiring.

In 2000, Okazaki returned to the camp for the first time with her mother to attend the annual Manzanar Pilgrimage. Although the gymnasium was in a dilapidated state, the National Park Service was redeveloping the campsite and she did not return until the National Park Service developed the site, making the old gymnasium into an interpretive center and auditorium. By then, Okazaki decided to join the Manzanar Committee and become more involved, due to the reprint in 2001 of the Ansel Adams book, Born Free and Equal, with her photo on the book jacket. Until her retirement, she attended meetings and events only, but after her retirement, she began speaking to clubs, organizations, and churches and to Middle and High School classes at various schools in the Metropolitan Los Angeles area with her Power Point presentation. She also did volunteering at the Joint Forces Training Base in Los Alamitos. Okazaki is the past treasurer for the Manzanar Committee, an NGO which promotes education about the World War II incarceration of Japanese-Americans.

== Born Free and Equal ==
Adams' book, Born Free and Equal: The Story of Loyal Japanese Americans was published in 1944 by U.S. Camera. In January 2002, fifty-nine years after the publication of the original U.S. Camera edition, a hardcover edition of the book was released by Spotted Dog Press of Bishop, California, with front matter that included essays by former internees, Sue Kunitomi Embrey; Archie Miyatake, son of Manzanar camp photographer Toyo Miyatake; and then Eastern California Museum director, William Michael.
