= Leni Riefenstahl =

German filmmaker (1902–2003)

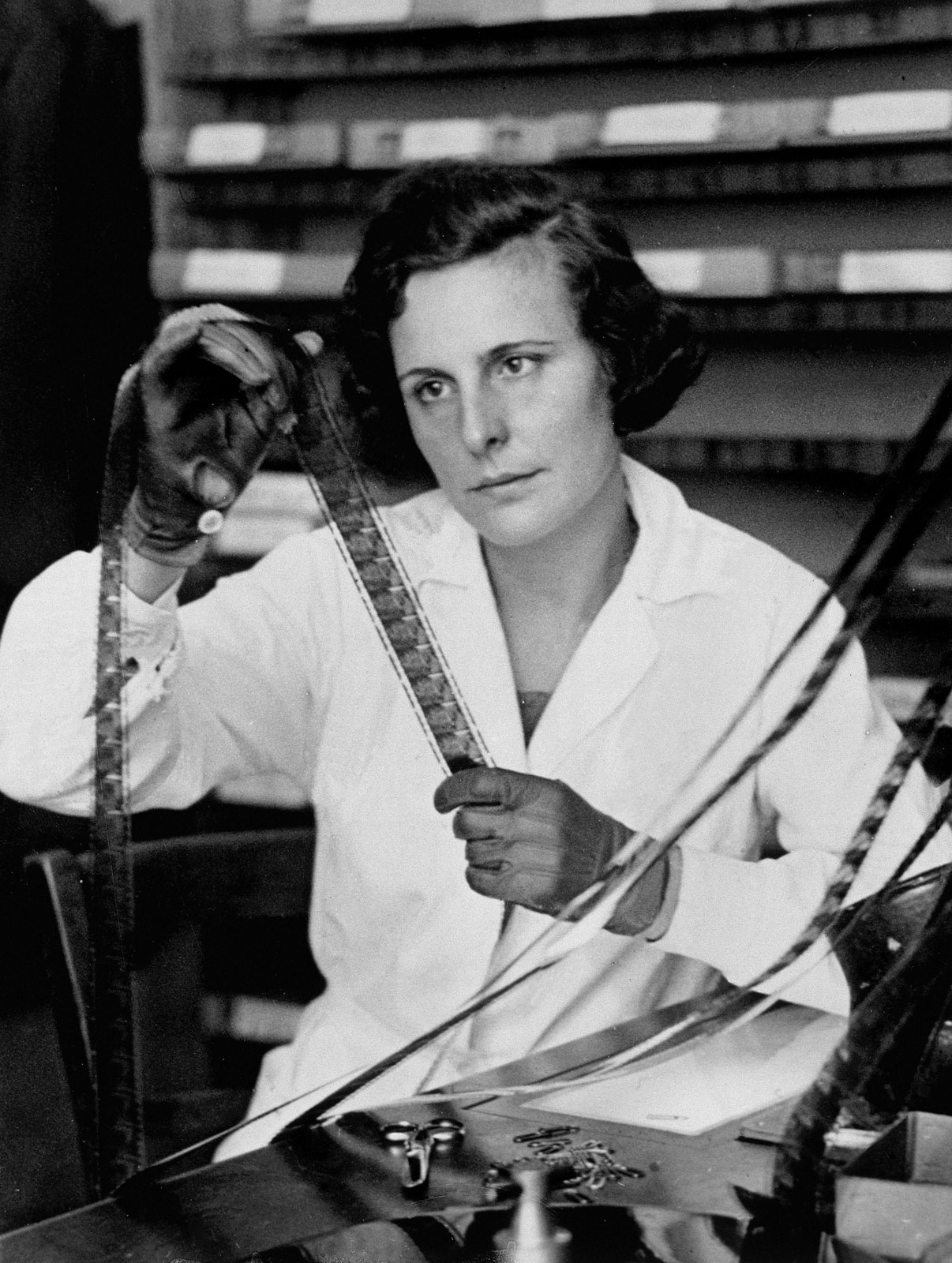
- Riefenstahl in 1935
- Born: Helene Bertha Amalie Riefenstahl; 22 August 1902; Berlin, German Empire
- Died: 8 September 2003 (aged 101); Pöcking, Germany
- Resting place: Munich Waldfriedhof
- Occupations: Film director; producer; screenwriter; editor; photographer; actress
- Years active: 1925–2002
- Notable work: The Victory of Faith (1933); Triumph of the Will (1935); Olympia (1938); Tiefland (1954)
- Spouses: Eugen Karl "Peter" Jacob (m. 1944; div. 1946) Horst Kettner (m. 2003)
- Website: leni-riefenstahl.de

Helene Bertha Amalie "Leni" Riefenstahl (German: [ˈleːniː ˈʁiːfn̩ʃtaːl]; 22 August 1902 – 8 September 2003) was a German filmmaker, photographer, and actress. She is considered one of the most controversial personalities in film history. Regarded by many critics as an "innovative filmmaker and creative aesthete", she is also criticized for her works in the service of propaganda during the Nazi era.

A talented swimmer and an artist, Riefenstahl became interested in dancing during her childhood, taking lessons and performing across all Europe. After seeing a promotional poster for the 1924 film Mountain of Destiny, she was inspired to move into acting and between 1925 and 1929 starred in five successful motion pictures. Riefenstahl became one of the few women in Germany to direct a film during the Weimar era when, in 1932, she decided to try directing with her own film, The Blue Light.

In the 1930s, she directed the Nazi propaganda films Triumph of the Will (1935) and Olympia (1938), resulting in worldwide attention and acclaim. The films are widely considered two of the most effective and technically innovative propaganda films ever made. Her involvement in Triumph of the Will, however, significantly damaged her career and reputation after World War II. Adolf Hitler closely collaborated with Riefenstahl during the production of at least three important Nazi films, and they formed a friendly relationship.

After the war, Riefenstahl was arrested and found to be a Nazi "fellow traveller" but was not charged with war crimes. Throughout her later life, she denied having known about the Holocaust, and was criticized as the "voice of the 'how could we have known?' defence". Riefenstahl's post-war work includes the release of the film Tiefland in 1954, her work as a photographer, her autobiography in 1987, underwater photographs and two photo books on the Nuba peoples of southern Sudan.

== Early life ==
Helene Bertha Amalie Riefenstahl was born in Berlin on 22 August 1902. Her father, Alfred Theodor Paul Riefenstahl, owned a successful heating and ventilation company and wanted his daughter to follow him into the business world. Since Riefenstahl was the only child for several years, Alfred wanted her to carry on the family name and secure the family fortune. However, her mother, Bertha Ida (Scherlach), who had been a part-time seamstress before her marriage, had faith in Riefenstahl and believed that her daughter's future was in show business. Riefenstahl had a younger brother, Heinz, who was killed at the age of 39 on the Eastern Front in Nazi Germany's war against the Soviet Union.

Riefenstahl fell in love with the arts in her childhood. She began to paint and write poetry at the age of four. She was also athletic, and at the age of twelve joined a gymnastics and swimming club called Nixe. Her mother was confident her daughter would grow up to be successful in the field of art and therefore gave her full support, unlike Riefenstahl's father, who was not interested in his daughter's artistic inclinations. In 1918, when she was 16, Riefenstahl attended a presentation of Snow White which interested her deeply; it led her to want to be a dancer. Her father instead wanted to provide his daughter with an education that could lead to a more dignified occupation. His wife, however, continued to support her daughter's passion. Without her husband's knowledge, she enrolled Riefenstahl in dance and ballet classes at the Grimm-Reiter Dance School in Berlin, where she quickly became a star pupil.

== Dancing and acting careers ==
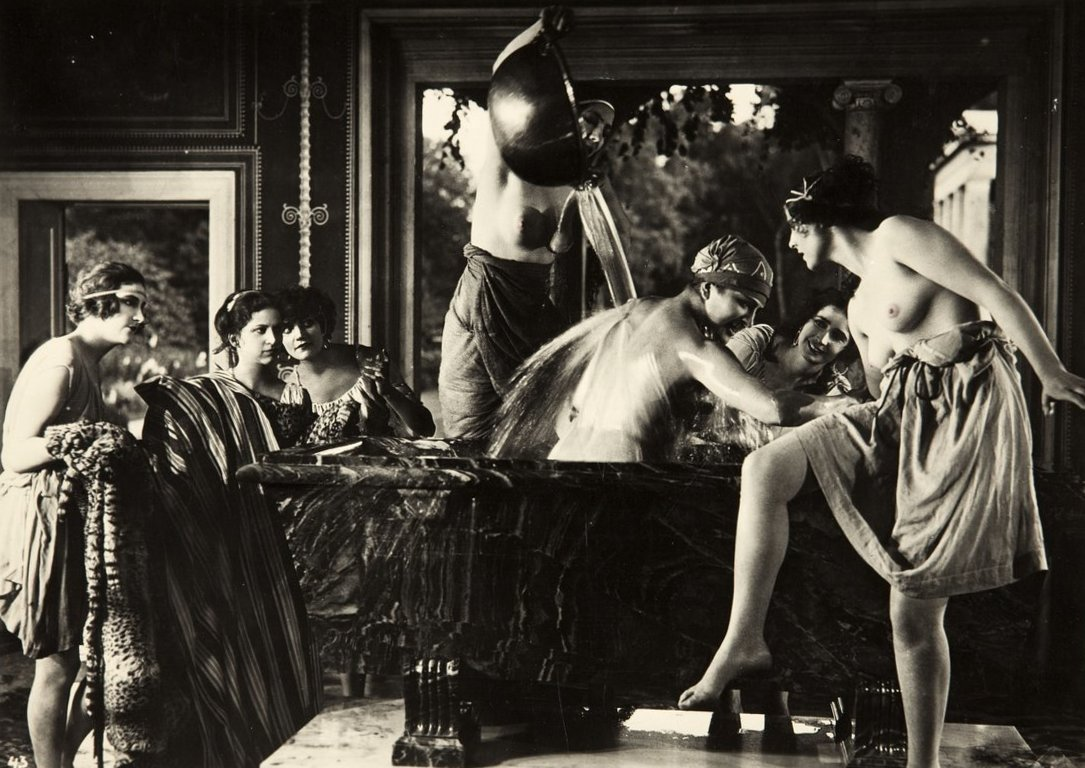
Riefenstahl (right) as a topless "Roman Bath" extra in Wege zu Kraft und Schönheit (1925)

Riefenstahl attended dancing academies and became well known for her self-styled interpretive dancing skills, traveling across Europe with Max Reinhardt in a show funded by Jewish producer Harry Sokal. Riefenstahl often made almost 700 ℛ︁ℳ︁ for each performance. She began to suffer a series of foot injuries, which led to knee surgery that threatened her dancing career. It was while going to a doctor's appointment that she first saw a poster for the 1924 film Mountain of Destiny. She became inspired to go into movie making, and began visiting the cinema to see films and also attended film shows.

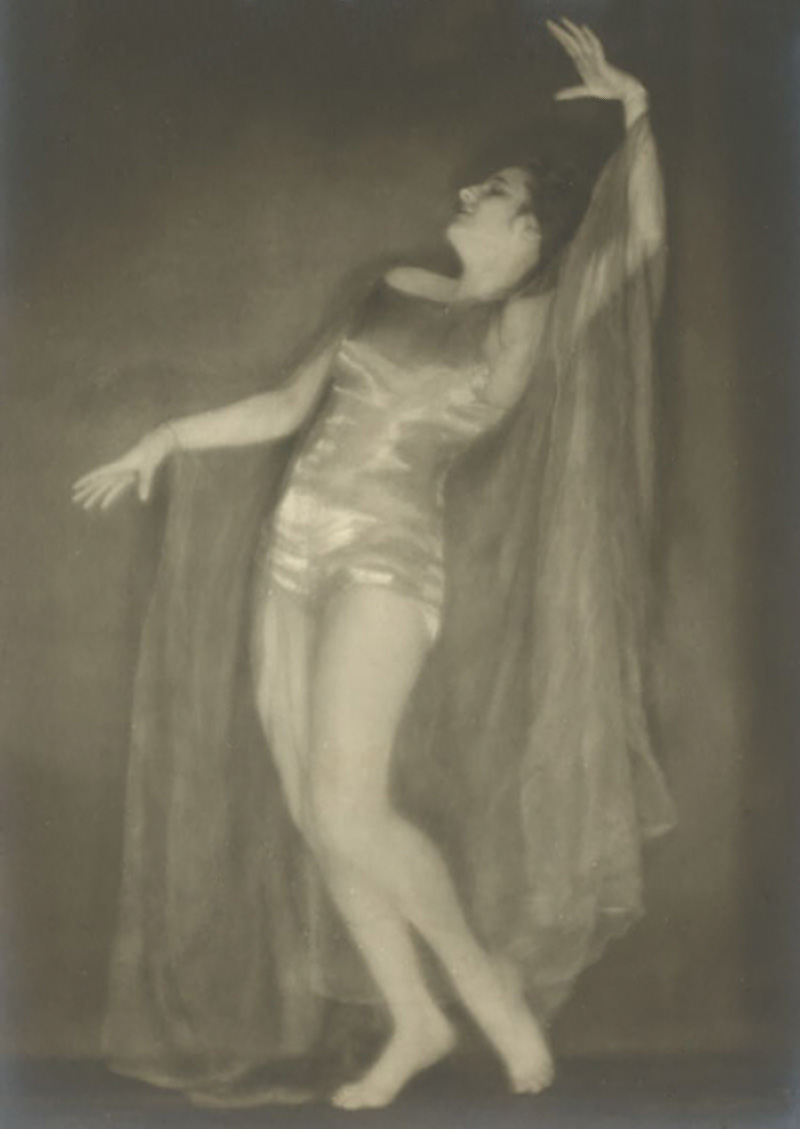
Riefenstahl, 1927, by Mario von Bucovich

On one of her adventures, Riefenstahl met Luis Trenker, an actor who had appeared in Mountain of Destiny. At a meeting arranged by her friend Gunther Rahn, she met Arnold Fanck, the director of Mountain of Destiny and a pioneer of the mountain film genre. Fanck was working on a film in Berlin. After Riefenstahl told him how much she admired his work, she also convinced him of her acting skill. She persuaded him to feature her in one of his films. Riefenstahl later received a package from Fanck containing the script of the 1926 film The Holy Mountain. She made a series of films for Fanck, where she learned from him acting and film editing techniques. One of Fanck's films that brought Riefenstahl into the limelight was The White Hell of Pitz Palu of 1929, co-directed by G. W. Pabst. She had to undergo many physical challenges that would probably be deemed unethical in today's standards. Some of the torments included: being engulfed in small avalanches, jumping into mountain lakes and icy streams, climbing rocky pinnacles while barefoot, letting herself be pulled up a rock face being pelted by snow and ice, balancing on a ladder above a deep glacial crevasse, and enduring obscene jokes from her exclusively male colleagues. Her fame spread to countries outside Germany.

Riefenstahl produced and directed her own work called Das Blaue Licht ("The Blue Light") in 1932, co-written by Carl Mayer and Béla Balázs. This film won the silver medal at the Venice Film Festival, but was not universally well-received, for which Riefenstahl blamed the critics, many of whom were Jewish. Upon its 1938 re-release, the names of Balázs and Sokal, both Jewish, were removed from the credits; some reports say this was at Riefenstahl's behest. In the film, Riefenstahl played an innocent peasant girl who is hated by the villagers because they think she is diabolical and cast out. She is protected by a glowing mountain grotto. According to herself, Riefenstahl received invitations to travel to Hollywood to create films, but she refused them in favor of remaining in Germany with a boyfriend. Hitler was a fan of the film, and thought Riefenstahl epitomized the perfect German female. He saw talent in Riefenstahl and arranged a meeting.

In 1933, Riefenstahl appeared in the U.S.-German co-productions of the Arnold Fanck-directed, German-language SOS Eisberg and the Tay Garnett-directed, English-language S.O.S. Iceberg. The films were filmed simultaneously in English and German and produced and distributed by Universal Studios. Her role as an actress in S.O.S. Iceberg was her only English language role in film.

== Directing career ==
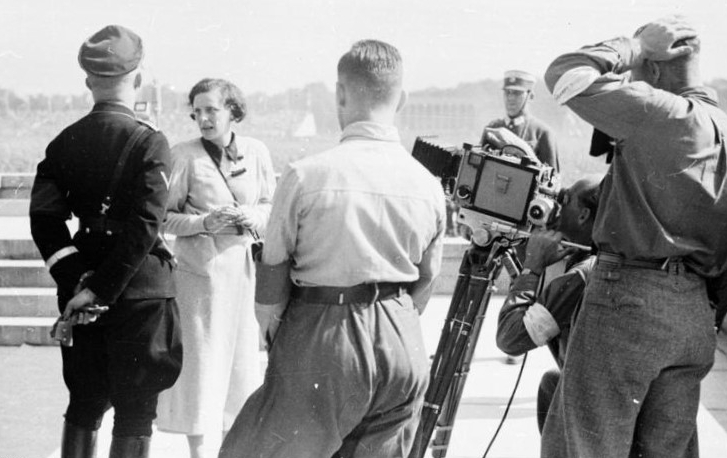
Riefenstahl stands near Heinrich Himmler while instructing her camera crew at Nuremberg, 1934.

=== Propaganda films ===
Riefenstahl heard Nazi Party (NSDAP) leader Adolf Hitler speak at a rally in 1932 and was mesmerized by his talent as a public speaker. Describing the experience in her memoir, Riefenstahl wrote, "I had an almost apocalyptic vision that I was never able to forget. It seemed as if the Earth's surface were spreading out in front of me, like a hemisphere that suddenly splits apart in the middle, spewing out an enormous jet of water, so powerful that it touched the sky and shook the earth."

Hitler was immediately captivated by Riefenstahl's work. She is described as fitting in with Hitler's ideal of Aryan womanhood, a feature he had noted when he saw her starring performance in Das Blaue Licht. In May 1933, Hitler asked Riefenstahl to make a film about Horst Wessel, but she declined. Riefenstahl was offered the opportunity to direct Der Sieg des Glaubens, an hour-long propaganda film about the fifth Nuremberg Rally in 1933. The opportunity that was offered was a huge surprise to Riefenstahl. Hitler had ordered Joseph Goebbels's Propaganda Ministry to give the film commission to Riefenstahl, but the Ministry had never informed her. Riefenstahl agreed to direct the movie even though she was only given a few days before the rally to prepare. She and Hitler got on well, forming a friendly relationship. The propaganda film was funded entirely by the NSDAP.

During the filming of Der Sieg des Glaubens, Hitler had stood side by side with the leader of the Sturmabteilung (SA), Ernst Röhm, a man with whom he clearly had a close working relationship. Röhm was murdered on Hitler's orders a short time later, during the purge of the SA referred to as the Night of the Long Knives. It has gone on record that, immediately following the killings, Hitler ordered all copies of the film to be destroyed, although Riefenstahl disputed that this ever happened.

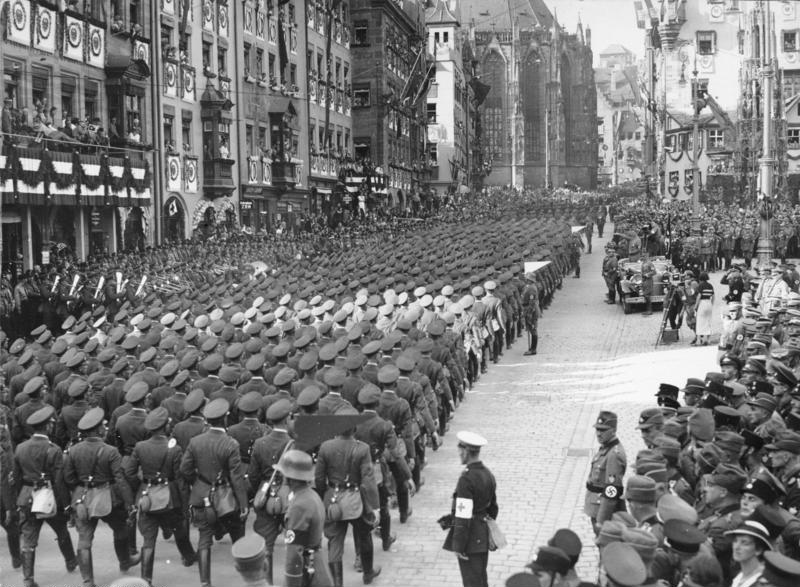
Riefenstahl and a camera crew stand in front of Hitler's car during the 1934 rally in Nuremberg.

Impressed with Riefenstahl's work, Hitler asked her to film Triumph des Willens ("Triumph of the Will"), a new propaganda film about the 1934 party rally in Nuremberg. More than one million Germans participated in the rally. The film is sometimes considered the greatest propaganda film ever made. Initially, according to Riefenstahl, she resisted and did not want to create further Nazi Party films, instead wanting to direct a feature film based on Eugen d'Albert's Tiefland ("Lowlands"), an opera that was extremely popular in Berlin in the 1920s. Riefenstahl received private funding for the production of Tiefland, but the filming in Spain was derailed and the project was cancelled. (When Tiefland was eventually shot, between 1940 and 1944, it was done in black and white, and was the third most expensive film produced in Nazi Germany. During the filming of Tiefland, Riefenstahl utilized Romani from internment camps for extras, who were severely mistreated on set, and when the filming completed they were sent to the death camp Auschwitz.) Hitler was able to convince her to film Triumph des Willens on the condition that she would not be required to make further films for the party, according to Riefenstahl. The motion picture was generally recognized as an epic, innovative work of propaganda filmmaking. The film took Riefenstahl's career to a new level and gave her further international recognition.

In interviews for the 1993 documentary The Wonderful, Horrible Life of Leni Riefenstahl, Riefenstahl adamantly denied any deliberate attempt to create Nazi propaganda and said she was disgusted that Triumph des Willens was used in such a way.

In a private letter to Hitler, quoted in a 2024 documentary, Riefenstahl seems enthusiastic about the propaganda effects of Triumph des Willens: "the film's impact as German propaganda is greater than I could have imagined and your image, my Führer, is always applauded."

Despite allegedly vowing not to make any more films about the Nazi Party, Riefenstahl made the 28-minute Tag der Freiheit: Unsere Wehrmacht ("Day of Freedom: Our Armed Forces") about the German Army in 1935. Like Der Sieg des Glaubens and Triumph des Willens, this was filmed at the annual Nazi Party rally at Nuremberg. Riefenstahl said this film was a sub-set of Der Sieg des Glaubens, added to mollify the German Army which felt it was not represented well in Triumph des Willens.

Hitler invited Riefenstahl to film the 1936 Summer Olympics scheduled to be held in Berlin, a film which Riefenstahl said had been commissioned by the International Olympic Committee. She visited Greece to take footage of the route of the inaugural torch relay and the games' original site at Olympia, where she was aided by Greek photographer Nelly's. This material became Olympia, a hugely successful film which has since been widely noted for its technical and aesthetic achievements. Olympia was secretly funded by the NSDAP. She was one of the first filmmakers to use tracking shots in a documentary, placing a camera on rails to follow the athletes' movement. The film is also noted for its slow motion shots. Riefenstahl played with the idea of slow motion, underwater diving shots, extremely high and low shooting angles, panoramic aerial shots, and tracking system shots for allowing fast action. Riefenstahl also "reversed the film to make the divers turn backwards, holding them in the air as if to defy the laws of gravity". Many of these shots were relatively unheard of at the time, but Riefenstahl's use and augmentation of them set a standard, and is the reason they are still used to this day. Riefenstahl's work on Olympia has been cited as a major influence in modern sports photography. Riefenstahl filmed competitors of all races, including African-American Jesse Owens in what later became famous footage.

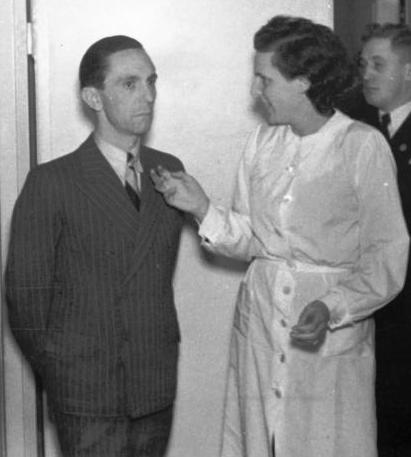
Riefenstahl in conversation with Propaganda Minister Joseph Goebbels, 1937

Olympia premiered for Hitler's 49th birthday in 1938. Its international debut led Riefenstahl to embark on an American publicity tour in an attempt to secure commercial release. In February 1937, Riefenstahl enthusiastically told a reporter for the Detroit News, "To me, Hitler is the greatest man who ever lived. He truly is without fault, so simple and at the same time possessed of masculine strength." On 31 August 1938, Olympia won the Mussolini cup at the Venice Film Festival as "Best foreign film". She arrived in New York City on 4 November 1938, five days before Kristallnacht (the "Night of the Broken Glass"). When news of the event reached the United States, Riefenstahl publicly defended Hitler. On 18 November, she was received by Henry Ford in Detroit. Olympia was shown at the Chicago Engineers Club two days later. Avery Brundage, President of the International Olympic Committee, praised the film and held Riefenstahl in the highest regard. She negotiated with Louis B. Mayer, and on 8 December, Walt Disney brought her on a three-hour tour showing her the ongoing production of Fantasia.

From the Goebbels Diaries, researchers learned that Riefenstahl had been friendly with Joseph Goebbels and his wife Magda, attending the opera with them and going to his parties. Riefenstahl maintained that Goebbels was upset when she rejected his advances and was jealous of her influence on Hitler, seeing her as an internal threat. She therefore insisted his diary entries could not be trusted. By later accounts, Goebbels thought highly of Riefenstahl's filmmaking but was angered with what he saw as her overspending of Nazi-provided filmmaking budgets.

=== Iconography ===
In Triumph of the Will, Tom Saunders argues that Hitler serves as the object of the camera's gaze. Saunders writes, "Without denying that 'rampant masculinity' (the 'sexiness' of Hitler and the SS) serves as the object of the gaze, I would suggest that desire is also directed toward the feminine. This occurs not in the familiar sequences of adoring women greeting Hitler's arrival and cavalcade through Nuremberg. In these Hitler clearly remains the focus of attraction, as more generally in the visual treatment of his mass following. Rather, it is encoded in representation of flags and banners, which were shot in such a way as to make them visually desirable as well as potent political symbols". The flag serves as a symbol of masculinity, equated with national pride and dominance, that supposedly channels men's sexual and masculine energy. Riefenstahl's cinematic framing of the flags encapsulated its iconography. Saunders continues, "The effect is a significant double transformation: the images mechanize human beings and breathe life into flags. Even when the carriers are not mostly submerged under the sea of colored cloth, and when facial features are visible in profile, they attain neither character nor distinctiveness. The men remain ants in a vast enterprise. By contrast and paradoxically, the flags, whether a few or hundreds peopling the frame, assume distinct identities".

=== Use of music ===
Riefenstahl distorts the diegetic sound in Triumph of the Will. Her distortion of sound suggests she was influenced by German art cinema. Influenced by Classical Hollywood cinema's style, German art film employed music to enhance the narrative, establish a sense of grandeur, and to heighten the emotions in a scene. In Triumph of the Will, Riefenstahl used traditional folk music to accompany and intensify her shots. Ben Morgan comments on Riefenstahl's distortion of sound: "In Triumph of the Will, the material world leaves no aural impression beyond the music. Where the film does combine diegetic noise with the music, the effects used are human (laughter or cheering) and offer a rhythmic extension to the music rather than a contrast to it. By replacing diegetic sound, Riefenstahl's film employs music to combine the documentary with the fantastic."

=== World War II ===
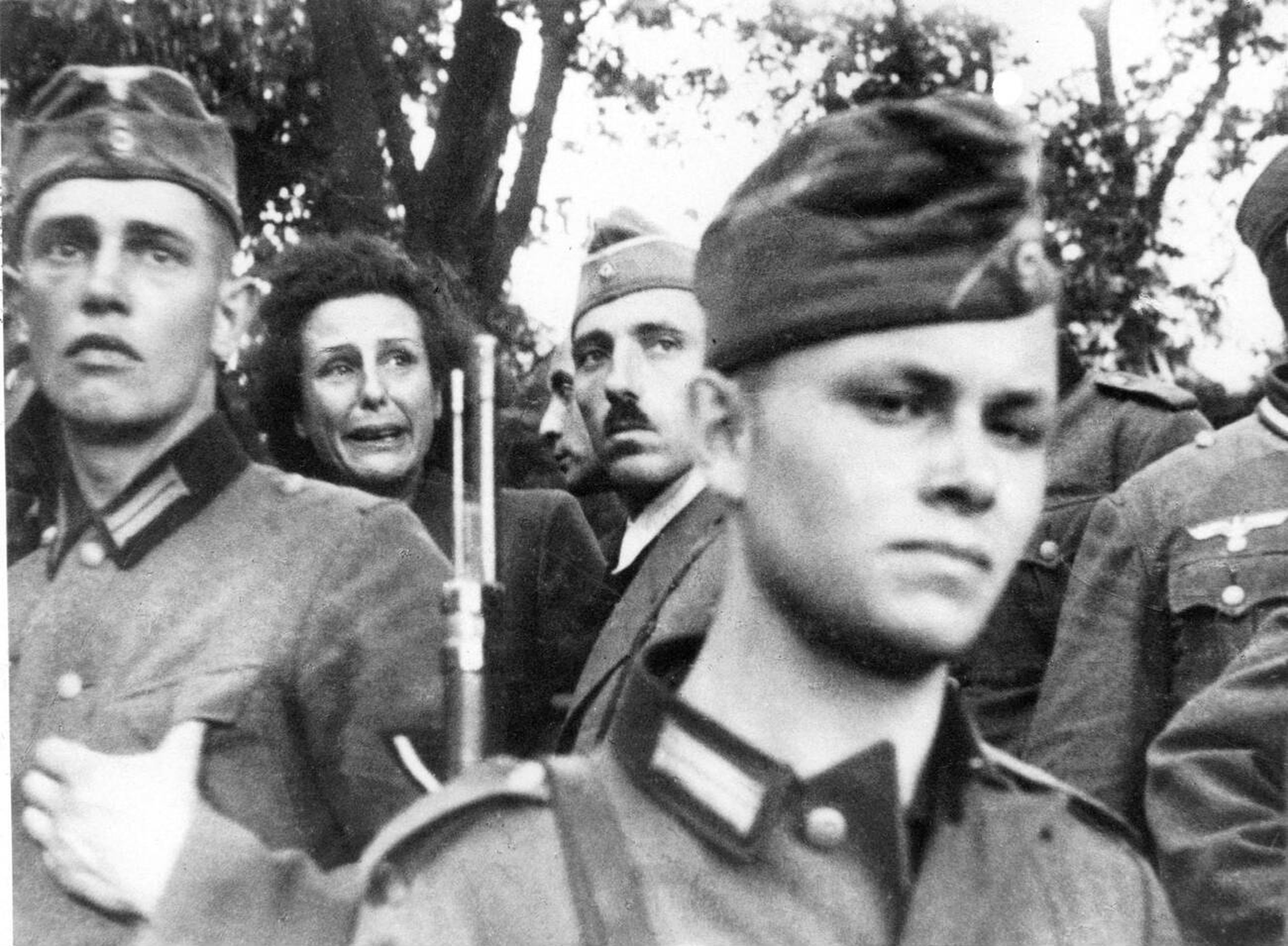
The controversial photo taken on 12 (for some other sources, 5) September 1939 in Końskie, Poland, in which Riefenstahl is crying and is visibly shocked

When Germany invaded Poland on 1 September 1939, Riefenstahl was photographed in Poland wearing a military uniform and a pistol on her belt in the company of German soldiers; she had gone to Poland as a war correspondent. On 12 September, she was in the town of Końskie when 30 civilians were executed in retaliation for an alleged attack on German soldiers. According to her memoir, Riefenstahl tried to intervene but a furious German soldier held her at gunpoint and threatened to shoot her on the spot. She said she did not realize the victims were Jews. According to another account given by a German officer, Riefenstahl had asked that the Jews be removed from the market so that she could film some shots of it, which was relayed to the soldiers as "Get rid of the Jews", thus leading to the massacre. Photographs of a distraught Riefenstahl survive from that day. Nevertheless, by 5 October 1939, Riefenstahl was back in occupied Poland filming Hitler's victory parade in Warsaw. Afterwards, she left Poland and chose not to make any more Nazi-related films.

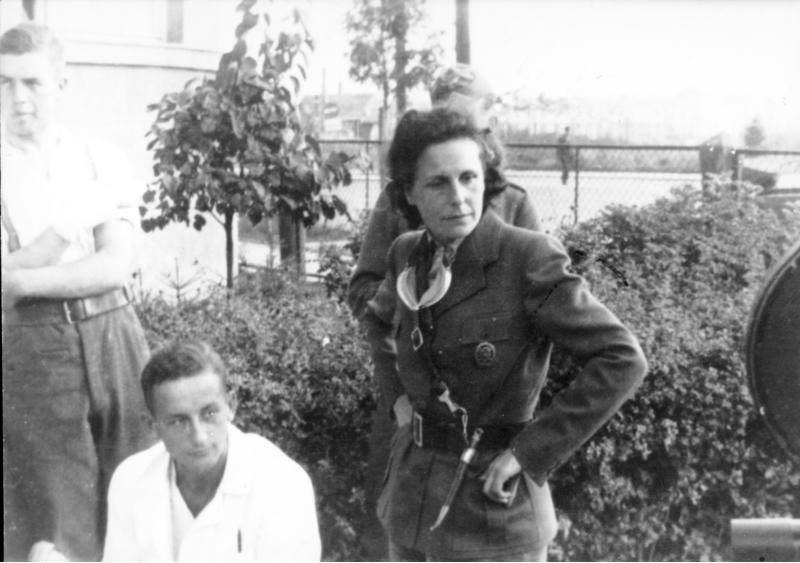
Riefenstahl as a war correspondent in Poland, 1939

On 14 June 1940, the day Paris was declared an open city by the French and occupied by German troops, Riefenstahl wrote to Hitler in a telegram, "With indescribable joy, deeply moved and filled with burning gratitude, we share with you, my Führer, your and Germany's greatest victory, the entry of German troops into Paris. You exceed anything human imagination has the power to conceive, achieving deeds without parallel in the history of mankind. How can we ever thank you?" She later explained, "Everyone thought the war was over, and in that spirit I sent the cable to Hitler". Riefenstahl was friends with Hitler for 12 years. However, her relationship with Hitler severely declined in 1944 after her brother died on the Russian Front.

After the Nuremberg rallies trilogy and Olympia, Riefenstahl began work on the movie she had tried and failed to direct once before, namely Tiefland. On Hitler's direct order, the German government paid her 7 million ℛ︁ℳ︁ in compensation. From 23 September until 13 November 1940, she filmed in Krün near Mittenwald. The extras playing Spanish women and farmers were drawn from Romani detained in a camp at Salzburg-Maxglan who were forced to work with her. Filming at the Babelsberg Studios near Berlin began 18 months later in April 1942. This time Sinti and Roma people from the Marzahn detention camp near Berlin were compelled to work as extras. Almost to the end of her life, despite overwhelming evidence that the concentration camp occupants that had been forced to work on the movie were later sent to the Auschwitz death camp, Riefenstahl continued to maintain that all the film extras survived. Riefenstahl sued filmmaker Nina Gladitz, who said Riefenstahl personally chose the extras at their holding camp; Gladitz had found one of the Romani survivors and matched his memory with stills of the movie for a documentary Gladitz was filming. The German court ruled largely in favour of Gladitz, declaring that Riefenstahl had known the extras were from a concentration camp, but they also agreed that Riefenstahl had not been informed the Romani would be sent to Auschwitz after filming was completed.

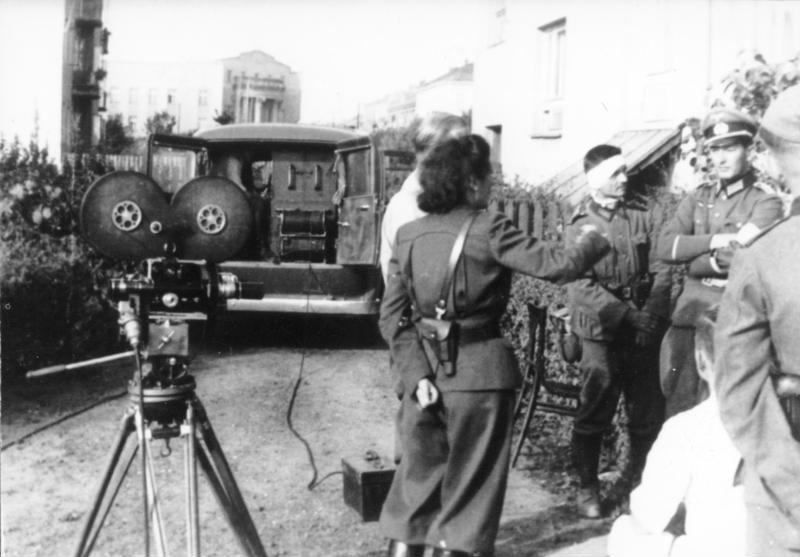
Riefenstahl instructing her film crew in Poland, 1939

This issue came up again in 2002, when Riefenstahl was 100 years old and she was taken to court by a Roma group for denying the Nazis had exterminated Romani. Riefenstahl apologized and said, "I regret that Sinti and Roma [people] had to suffer during the period of National Socialism. It is known today that many of them were murdered in concentration camps".

In October 1944 the production of Tiefland moved to Barrandov Studios in Prague for interior filming. Lavish sets made these shots some of the most costly of the film. The film was not edited and released until almost ten years later.

The last time Riefenstahl saw Hitler was when she married Peter Jacob on 21 March 1944. Riefenstahl and Jacob divorced in 1946. As Germany's military situation became impossible by early 1945, Riefenstahl left Berlin and was hitchhiking with a group of men, trying to reach her mother, when she was taken into custody by American troops. She walked out of a holding camp, beginning a series of escapes and arrests across the chaotic landscape. At last making it back home on a bicycle, she found that American troops had seized her house. She was surprised by how kindly they treated her.

=== Thwarted film projects ===
Most of Riefenstahl's unfinished projects were lost towards the end of the war. The French government confiscated all of her editing equipment, along with the production reels of Tiefland. After years of legal wrangling, these were returned to her, but the French government had reportedly damaged some of the film stock while trying to develop and edit it, with a few important scenes being missing (although Riefenstahl was surprised to find the original negatives for Olympia in the same shipment). During the filming of Olympia, Riefenstahl was funded by the state to create her own production company in her own name, Riefenstahl-Film GmbH, which was uninvolved with her most influential works. She edited and dubbed the remaining material and Tiefland premiered on 11 February 1954 in Stuttgart. However, it was denied entry into the Cannes Film Festival. Although Riefenstahl lived for almost another half century, Tiefland was her last feature film.

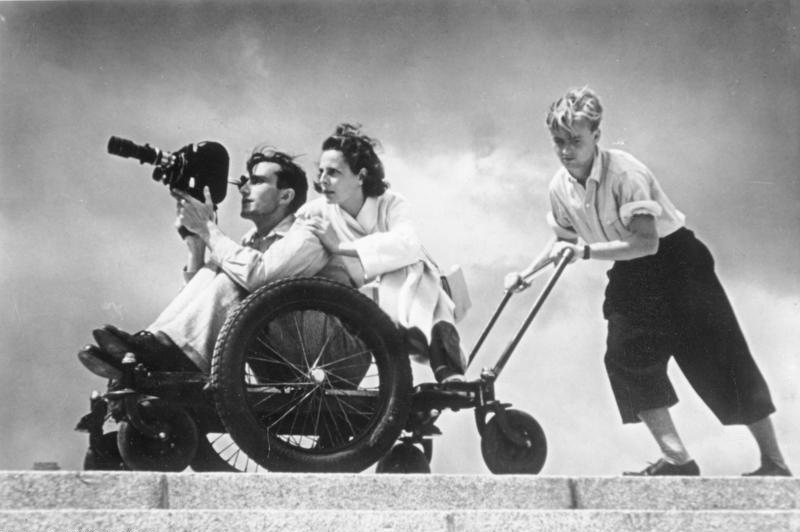
Riefenstahl filming a difficult scene with the help of two assistants, 1936

Riefenstahl tried many times to make more films during the 1950s and 1960s, but was met with resistance, public protests and sharp criticism. Many of her filmmaking peers in Hollywood had fled Nazi Germany and were unsympathetic to her. Although both film professionals and investors were willing to support her work, most of the projects she attempted were stopped owing to ever-renewed and highly negative publicity about her past work in Nazi Germany.

In 1954, Jean Cocteau, who greatly admired the film, insisted on Tiefland being shown at the Cannes Film Festival, which he was running that year. In 1960, Riefenstahl attempted to prevent filmmaker Erwin Leiser from juxtaposing scenes from Triumph des Willens with footage from concentration camps in his film Mein Kampf. Riefenstahl had high hopes for a collaboration with Cocteau called Friedrich und Voltaire ("Friedrich and Voltaire"), wherein Cocteau was to play two roles. They thought the film might symbolize the love-hate relationship between Germany and France. Cocteau's illness and 1963 death put an end to the project. A musical remake of Das Blaue Licht ("The Blue Light") with an English production company also fell apart.

In the 1960s, Riefenstahl became interested in Africa from Ernest Hemingway's Green Hills of Africa and from the photographs of George Rodger. She visited Kenya for the first time in 1956 and later Sudan, where she photographed Nuba tribes with whom she sporadically lived, learning about their culture so she could photograph them more easily. Even though her film project about modern slavery entitled Die Schwarze Fracht ("The Black Cargo") was never completed, Riefenstahl was able to sell the stills from the expedition to magazines in various parts of the world. While scouting shooting locations, she almost died from injuries received in a truck accident. After waking up from a coma in a Nairobi hospital, she finished writing the script, but was soon thoroughly thwarted by uncooperative locals, the Suez Canal crisis and bad weather. In the end, the film project was called off. Even so, Riefenstahl was granted Sudanese citizenship for her services to the country, becoming the first foreigner to receive a Sudanese passport.

== Detention and trials ==
Novelist and sports writer Budd Schulberg, assigned by the U.S. Navy to the OSS for intelligence work while attached to John Ford's documentary unit, was ordered to arrest Riefenstahl at her chalet in Kitzbühel, ostensibly to have her identify Nazi war criminals in German film footage captured by the Allied troops shortly after the war. Riefenstahl said she was not aware of the nature of the internment camps. According to Schulberg, "She gave me the usual song and dance. She said, 'Of course, you know, I'm really so misunderstood. I'm not political'".

Riefenstahl said she was fascinated by the Nazis, but also politically naive, claiming ignorance about any war crimes. Throughout 1945 to 1948, she was held in various Allied-controlled prison camps across Germany. She was also under house arrest for a period of time. She was tried four times by postwar authorities for denazification and eventually found to be a "fellow traveller" (Mitläufer) who sympathised with the Nazis. While never an official member of the Nazi party, she was always seen in association due to the propaganda films she made in Nazi Germany. Over the years, she filed and won over fifty libel cases against people who had accused her of complicity in Nazi crimes.

Riefenstahl said that her biggest regret in life was meeting Hitler, declaring, "It was the biggest catastrophe of my life. Until the day I die people will keep saying, 'Leni is a Nazi', and I'll keep saying, 'But what did she do?'" Even though she went on to win up to fifty libel cases, details about her relation to the Nazi party remained unclear during her lifetime.

Shortly before she died, Riefenstahl voiced her final words on the subject of her connection to Hitler in a BBC interview: "I was one of millions who thought Hitler had all the answers. We saw only the good things; we didn't know bad things were to come."

In October 2024, Andres Veiel and Sandra Maischberger released a documentary based on Riefenstahl's legacy document collection of 700 archive boxes.

== Africa, photography, books and final film ==
Riefenstahl began a lifelong companionship with her cameraman Horst Kettner, who was 40 years her junior and assisted her with the photographs; they were together from the time she was 60 and he was 20.

Riefenstahl travelled to Africa, inspired by the works of George Rodger that celebrated the ceremonial wrestling matches of the Nuba. Riefenstahl's books with photographs of the Nuba tribes were published in 1974 and republished in 1976 as Die Nuba (translated as "The Last of the Nuba") and Die Nuba von Kau ("The Nuba People of Kau"). They were harshly criticized by American writer and critic Susan Sontag, who wrote in The New York Review of Books that they were evidence of Riefenstahl's continued adherence to "fascist aesthetics". In this review, which art critic Hilton Kramer described as "one of the most important inquiries into the relation of esthetics to ideology we have had in many years", Sontag argued that:

Although the Nuba are black, not Aryan, Riefenstahl's portrait of them is consistent with some of the larger themes of Nazi ideology: the contrast between the clean and the impure, the incorruptible and the defiled, the physical and the mental, the joyful and the critical. [...] What is distinctive about the fascist version of the old idea of the Noble Savage is its contempt for all that is reflective, critical, and pluralistic. [...] In celebrating a society where the exhibition of physical skill and courage and the victory of the stronger man over the weaker have, at least as she sees it, become the unifying symbol of the communal culture—where success in fighting is the "main aspiration of a man's life"—Riefenstahl seems only to have modified the ideas of her Nazi films.

In December 1974, American writer and photographer Eudora Welty reviewed Die Nuba positively for the New York Times, giving an impressionistic account of the aesthetics of Riefenstahl's book:

She uses the light purposefully: the full, blinding brightness to make us see the all‐absorbing blackness of the skin; the ray of light slanting down from the single hole, high in the wall, that is the doorway of the circular house, which tells us how secret and safe it has been made; the first dawn light streaking the face of a calf in the sleeping camp where the young men go to live, which suggests their world apart. All the pictures bring us the physical beauty of the people: a young girl, shy and mischievous of face, with a bead sewn into her lower lip like a permanent cinnamon drop; a wrestler prepared for his match, with his shaven head turned to look over the massive shoulder, all skin color taken away by a coating of ashes.

Art Director's Club of Germany awarded Riefenstahl a gold medal for the best photographic achievement of 1975. She also sold some of the pictures to German magazines.

Riefenstahl photographed the 1972 Olympic Games in Munich, and rock star Mick Jagger along with his wife Bianca for The Sunday Times. Years later, Riefenstahl photographed Las Vegas entertainers Siegfried & Roy. Riefenstahl was honored at the inaugural Telluride Film Festival in 1974. She was guest of honour at the 1976 Olympic Games in Montreal, Quebec, Canada.

In 1978, Riefenstahl published a book of her sub-aquatic photographs called Korallengärten ("Coral Gardens"), followed by the 1990 book Wunder unter Wasser ("Wonder under Water"). On 22 August 2002, her 100th birthday, she released the film Impressionen unter Wasser ("Underwater Impressions"), an idealized documentary of life in the oceans and her first film in over 25 years. Riefenstahl was a member of Greenpeace for eight years. When filming Impressionen unter Wasser, Riefenstahl lied about her age in order to be certified for scuba diving.

Riefenstahl survived a helicopter crash in Sudan in 2000 while trying to learn the fates of her Nuba friends during the Second Sudanese Civil War, and was airlifted to a Munich hospital, where she received treatment for two broken ribs.

== Death ==
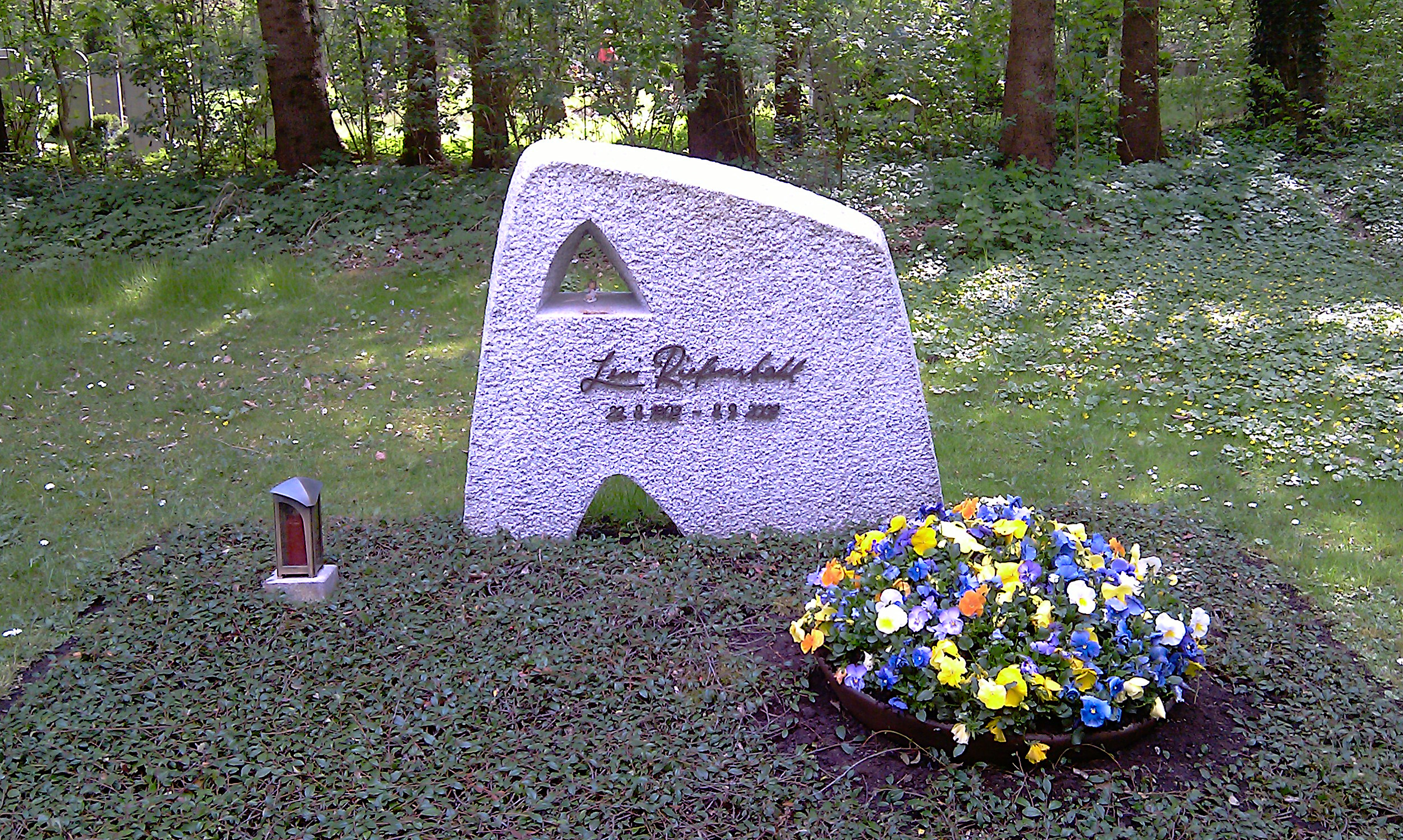
Riefenstahl's grave in Munich Waldfriedhof

Riefenstahl celebrated her 101st birthday on 22 August 2003 at a hotel in Feldafing, on Lake Starnberg, Bavaria, near her home. The day after her birthday celebration, she became ill.

Riefenstahl had been diagnosed with cancer for some time, and her health rapidly deteriorated during the last weeks of her life. Kettner said in an interview in 2002, "Ms. Riefenstahl is in great pain and she has become very weak and is taking painkillers". Riefenstahl died in her sleep at around 10:00 pm on 8 September 2003 at her home in Pöcking. After cremation, her ashes were buried in Munich Waldfriedhof.

After her death, there was a varied response in the obituary pages of leading publications, although most recognized her technical breakthroughs in filmmaking.

Gisela Jahn, Leni Riefenstahl's former secretary and sole heir, donated the estate bequeathed to her to the Prussian Cultural Heritage Foundation. Items included photographs, films, manuscripts, letters, files, and documents dating back to the 1920s.

== Reception ==
Riefenstahl claimed in her memoir that Hitler made advances on her at their first meeting in May 1932. Her press secretary Ernst Jaeger came with her to the United States in 1938, but did not return to Germany. He published How Riefenstahl became Hitler's girlfriend in the Hollywood Tribune in 1939. Trenker sold a fake version of Eva Braun's diary, which included stories of Riefenstahl dancing naked for Hitler, to the press. The book was published in French in 1948, and translated to Italian and English. Fritz Wiedemann, the personal adjutant to Hitler, stated that Riefenstahl "was never Hitler's lover".

According to Taylor Downing, Riefenstahl's Nazi-era work "made it acceptable, even desirable, for millions of Germans to go along with Hitler. And in promoting the Nazi leadership, there is a direct line from her infamous Nazi party films to Auschwitz and Belsen." Similarly, Abraham Cooper argues that Riefenstahl's work was essential to the carrying out of the mission of the Holocaust and describes her as an "unindicted co-conspirator."

Film scholar Mark Cousins notes in his book The Story of Film that, "Next to Orson Welles and Alfred Hitchcock, Leni Riefenstahl was the most technically talented Western film maker of her era."

When traveling to Hollywood to showcase her film Olympia shortly after the coordinated attack on German Jews known as Kristallnacht, Riefenstahl was criticized by the Non-Sectarian Anti-Nazi League and others.

At the 1974 Telluride Film Festival, filmmaker Dušan Makavejev stated, "Leni was a genius glorifying the wrong cause."

Reviewer Gary Morris called Riefenstahl, "An artist of unparalleled gifts, a woman in an industry dominated by men, one of the great formalists of the cinema on a par with Eisenstein or Welles." Film critic Hal Erickson of The New York Times states that the "Jewish Question" is mainly unmentioned in Triumph des Willens; "filmmaker Leni Riefenstahl prefers to concentrate on cheering crowds, precision marching, military bands, and Hitler's climactic speech, all orchestrated, choreographed and illuminated on a scale that makes Griffith and DeMille look like poverty-row directors."

Charles Moore of The Daily Telegraph wrote, "She was perhaps the most talented female cinema director of the 20th century; her celebration of Nazi Germany in film ensured that she was certainly the most infamous."

Film journalist Sandra Smith from The Independent remarked, "Opinions will be divided between those who see her as a young, talented and ambitious woman caught up in the tide of events which she did not fully understand, and those who believe her to be a cold and opportunist propagandist and a Nazi by association."

Critic Judith Thurman said in The New Yorker that, "Riefenstahl's genius has rarely been questioned, even by critics who despise the service to which she lent it. Riefenstahl was a consummate stylist obsessed with bodies in motion, particularly those of dancers and athletes. Riefenstahl relies heavily for her transitions on portentous cutaways to butts, mist, statuary, foliage, and rooftops. Her reaction shots have a tedious sameness: shining, ecstatic faces—nearly all young and Aryan, except for Hitler's."

Pauline Kael, also a film reviewer employed by The New Yorker, called Triumph des Willens and Olympia, "the two greatest films ever directed by a woman".

Writer Richard Corliss wrote in Time that he was "impressed by Riefenstahl's standing as a total auteur: producer, writer, director, editor and, in the fiction films, actress. The issues her films and her career raise are as complex and they are important, and her vilifiers tend to reduce the argument to one of a director's complicity in atrocity or her criminal ignorance."

In 2002, Steven Bach wrote that "Riefenstahl disturbs because she remains the adamant, fierce, glib voice of the 'how could we have known?' defense, an argument fewer and fewer Germans, and almost none of the current generation, still feel comfortable making."

== Film biographies ==
In 1993, Riefenstahl was the subject of the award-winning German documentary film The Wonderful, Horrible Life of Leni Riefenstahl, directed by Ray Müller. Riefenstahl appeared in the film and answered several questions and detailed the production of her films. The biofilm was nominated for seven Emmy Awards, winning in one category. Riefenstahl, who for some time had been working on her memoirs, decided to cooperate in the production of this documentary to tell her life story about the struggles she had gone through in her personal life, her film-making career and what people thought of her. She was also the subject of Müller's 2000 documentary film Leni Riefenstahl: Her Dream of Africa, about her return to Sudan to visit the Nuba people.

In 2000, Jodie Foster was planning a biographical drama on Riefenstahl, then seen as the last surviving member of Hitler's "inner circle", causing protests, with the Simon Wiesenthal Centre's dean Marvin Hier warning against a revisionist view that glorified the director, observing that Riefenstahl had seemed "quite infatuated" with Hitler. In 2007, British screenwriter Rupert Walters was reported to be writing a script for the movie. The project did not receive Riefenstahl's approval prior to her death, as Riefenstahl asked for a veto on any scenes to which she did not agree. Riefenstahl reportedly wanted Sharon Stone to play her rather than Foster.

In 2011, director Steven Soderbergh revealed that he had also been working on a biopic of Riefenstahl for about six months. He eventually abandoned the project over concerns of its commercial prospects.

In 2024, director Andres Veiel released a documentary titled Riefenstahl. It premiered at the 81st Venice International Film Festival, and was also screened at the MAMI Mumbai Film Festival 2024.

== In popular culture ==
Riefenstahl was portrayed by Zdena Studenková in Leni, a 2014 Slovak drama play about her fictional participation in The Tonight Show Starring Johnny Carson. She was portrayed by Dutch actress Carice van Houten in Race, a sports drama film directed by Stephen Hopkins about Jesse Owens. It was released in North America on 19 February 2016.

In the 2016 short film Leni. Leni., based on the play by Tom McNab and directed by Adrian Vitoria, Hildegard Neil portrays Riefenstahl. In 2021, she was the subject of Nigel Farndale's novel The Dictator's Muse.

At the 2024 Venice Film Festival, the documentary Riefenstahl was launched by director Andres Veiel and produced by Sandra Maischberger. The feature points to the filmmaker's ideological affinity with Nazism.

In 2026, director Paul Verhoeven specifically stated that Rifenstahl was his inspiration for the troopers and their uniforms in his 1997 film Starship Troopers and criticized U.S. president Donald Trump for not knowing that they were supposed to be fascist after Trump posted to social media AI uniforms designed for the U.S. Space Force inspired by the movie's designs.

=== In fiction ===
Daniel Kehlmann's 2023 novel, The Director, portrays director G.W Pabst's moral struggles under the Nazi regime. The Director includes a chapter in which Pabst is sent to assist Riefenstahl in the making of her film Tiefland. Riefenstahl exercises her power by refusing Pabst's suggestions, intimidating the others on the set, and by bringing Romani prisoners from the nearby Marzahn concentration camp to serve as extras. Eventually, Pabst decides that art is more important than morals and will turn to a similar source while working on his now-lost film Der Fall Molander.

== Filmography ==
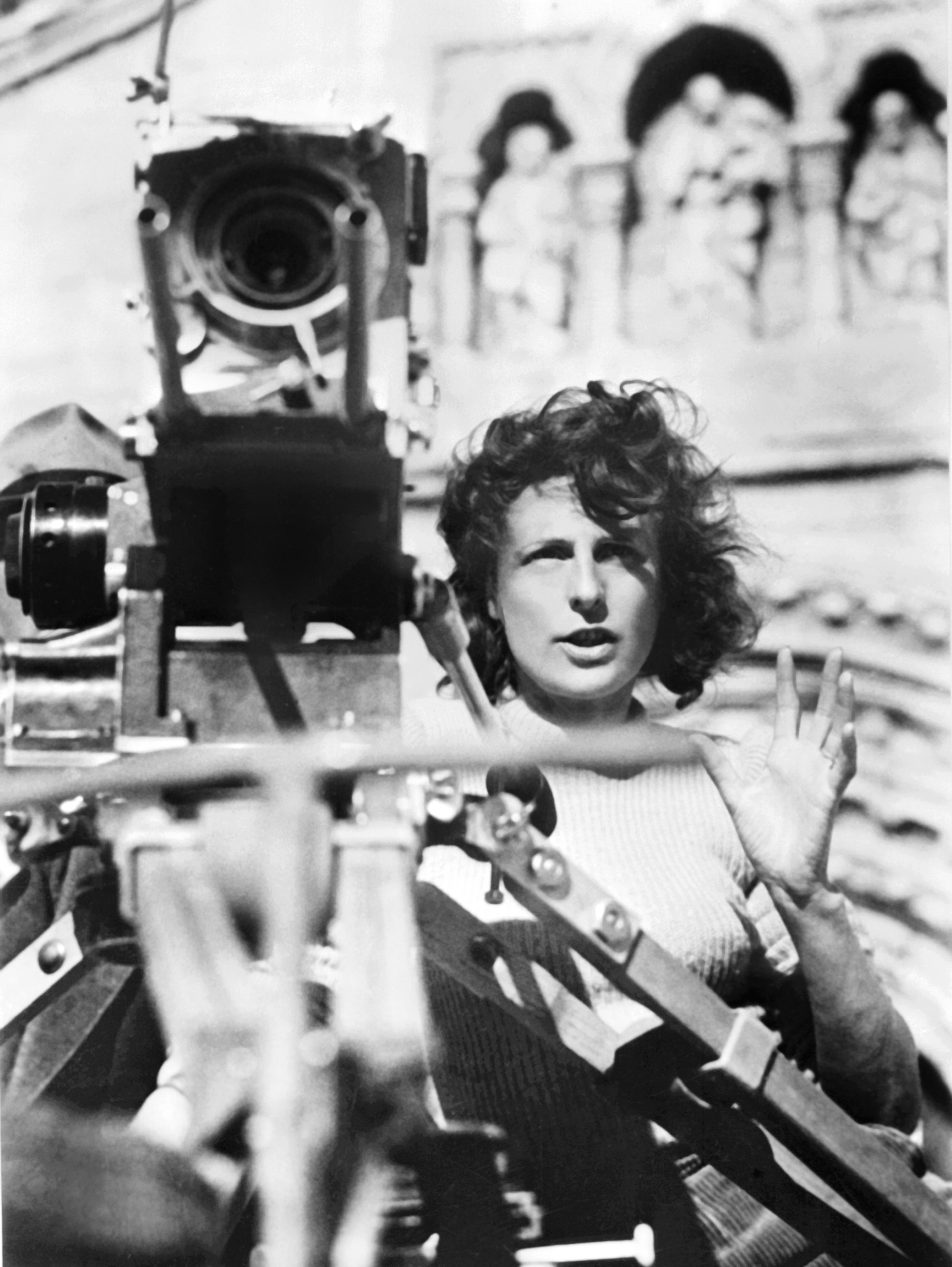
Riefenstahl at work on Tiefland in 1940

=== Filmography ===
Year	Title	Director	Writer	Producer	Editor	Notes
1932	The Blue Light	Yes	Story	Yes	Yes	Narrative feature film
1933	The Victory of Faith	Yes	Yes	Yes	Yes	Propagandistic documentary film for the Nazi Party
1935	Triumph of the Will	Yes	Yes	Yes	Uncredited	Propagandistic documentary film for the Nazi Party
1935	Day of Freedom: Our Armed Forces	Yes	Yes	Yes	Yes	Propagandistic documentary medium-length film for the NSDAP that was considered lost until 1970
1938	Olympia Part One: Festival of the Nations	Yes	Yes	Yes	Yes	Documentary film about the 1936 Olympic Games
1938	Olympia Part Two: Beauty of the Festival	Yes	Yes	Yes	Yes	Documentary film about the 1936 Olympic Games
1954	Tiefland	Yes	Yes	Yes	Yes	Narrative feature film
2002	Impressions Under Water	Yes	No	No	Yes	Documentary medium-length film about the bottom of the sea Also co-cinematographer and final film.

=== Acting roles ===
- 1925: Wege zu Kraft und Schönheit ("Ways to Strength and Beauty") as Dancer
- 1926: Der heilige Berg ("The Holy Mountain") as Diotima
- 1927: Der große Sprung ("The Great Leap") as Gita
- 1928: Das Schicksal derer von Habsburg ("Fate of the House of Habsburg") as Maria Vetsera
- 1929: Die weiße Hölle vom Piz Palü ("The White Hell of Pitz Palu") as Maria Maioni
- 1930: Stürme über dem Mont Blanc ("Storm Over Mont Blanc") as Hella Armstrong
- 1931: Der weiße Rausch ("The White Ecstasy") as Leni
- 1932: Das blaue Licht ("The Blue Light") as Junta
- 1933: S.O.S. Eisberg ("S.O.S. Iceberg") as Hella, wife of Arctic expedition leader Carl Lorenz
- 1954: Tiefland ("Lowlands") as Martha, a Spanish dancer (final film role)

== Books ==
- Riefenstahl, Leni (1973). Die Nuba [The Last of the Nuba]. St. Martin's Press. ISBN 978-0-312-13642-0.
- Riefenstahl, Leni (1976). Die Nuba von Kau [The Nuba People of Kau]. St. Martin's Press. ISBN 978-0-312-16963-3.
- Riefenstahl, Leni (1978). Korallengärten [Coral Gardens]. Harper & Row. ISBN 978-0-06-013591-1.
- Riefenstahl, Leni (1982). Mein Afrika [Vanishing Africa]. Harmony Books. ISBN 978-0-517-54914-8.
- Riefenstahl, Leni (1987). Leni Riefenstahl's Memoiren [Leni Riefenstahl's Memoir]. Taschen. ISBN 978-3-8228-0834-4.
- Riefenstahl, Leni (1990). Wunder unter Wasser [Wonders under Water]. Herbig. ISBN 978-3-7766-1651-4.
- Riefenstahl, Leni (1995). Leni Riefenstahl: a memoir. New York: Picador. ISBN 9780312119263. (reviewed by bell hooks)
- Riefenstahl, Leni (2002). Africa. Taschen. ISBN 978-3-8228-1616-5.
- Riefenstahl, Leni (2002). Riefenstahl Olympia. Taschen. ISBN 978-3-8228-1945-6.

== Works cited ==
=== Books ===
- Aitken, Ian (2013). The Concise Routledge Encyclopedia of the Documentary Film. Routledge. ISBN 978-0415596428.
- Andrew, Geoff (1999). The Director's Vision: A Concise Guide to the Art of 250 Great Filmmakers. A Cappella. ISBN 978-1556523663.
- Bach, Steven (2007). Leni: The Life and Work of Leni Riefenstahl. Little, Brown. ISBN 978-0-31686-111-3.
- Bernstein, Arnie (2013). Swastika Nation: Fritz Kuhn and the Rise and Fall of the German-American Bund. Macmillan. ISBN 978-1250036445.
- Edmondson, Jacqueline (2007). Jesse Owens: A Biography. Greenwood Publishing. ISBN 978-0313339882.
- Gale, Thomson (2007). Video Sourcebook: A Guide to Programs Currently Available on Video in the Areas Of: Movies/Entertainment, General Interest/Education, Sports/Recreation, Fine Arts, Heal. Cengage Learning. ISBN 978-1414400990.
- Heck-Rabi, Louise (1984). Women Filmmakers: A Critical Reception. Scarecrow Press. ISBN 978-0810816602.
- Hinton, David (2000). The Films of Leni Riefenstahl. Scarecrow Press. ISBN 978-1461635062.
- Infield, Glenn (1976). Leni Riefenstahl: the Fallen Film Goddess. Crowell. ISBN 978-0690011678.
- Kenrick, Donald (2006). The Final Chapter. University of Hertfordshire. ISBN 978-1902806495.
- Langford, Michelle (2012). Directory of World Cinema: Germany. Intellect Books. ISBN 978-1841504650.
- Niven, Bill (2018). Hitler and Film: The Führer's Hidden Passion. Yale University Press. ISBN 9780300200362.
- Rhiel, Mary; O'Sickey, Ingeborg; Pages, Neil (2008). Riefenstahl Screened: An Anthology of New Criticism. Bloomsbury Publishing. ISBN 978-1441104533.
- Rother, Rainer (2003). Leni Riefenstahl: The Seduction of Genius. A&C Black. ISBN 978-0826470232.
- Salkeld, Audrey (2011). A Portrait of Leni Riefenstahl. Random House. ISBN 978-1446475270.
- Tomlinson, Alan (2012). National Identity and Global Sports Events: Culture, Politics, and Spectacle in the Olympics and the Football World Cup. SUNY Press. ISBN 978-0791482483.
- Trimborn, Jürgen (2008). Leni Riefenstahl: A Life. Faber & Faber. ISBN 978-0865479760.
- Trimborn, Jürgen (2002). Leni Riefenstahl: Eine deutsche Karriere. Biographie [Leni Riefenstahl: a German career – Biography] (in German). Aufbau Verlag. ISBN 3-351-02536-X.

=== Journals ===
- Buruma, Ian (14 June 2007). "Fascinating Narcissim". The New York Review of Books. 54 (10).
- Sontag, Susan (6 February 1976). "Fascinating Fascism". The New York Review of Books. 22 (1). (The essay was also included in Sontag's 1980 book Under the Sign of Saturn)
- Taylor, Charles (19 April 2007). "Ill Will". The Nation.

=== Magazines ===
- Corliss, Richard (22 August 2002). "That Old Feeling: Leni's Triumph". Time.
- Downing, Taylor (8 August 2012). "The Olympics on Film". History Today.
- Ross, Harold Wallace; White, Katharine Sergeant Angell (1994). "Moschino". The New Yorker.
- Thurman, Judith (29 March 2007). "Where There's a Will: the Rise of Leni Riefenstahl". The New Yorker.

=== Online ===
- "Before Steven Speilberg there Was Leni Riefenstahl!". Crime File News. 28 December 2011. Archived from the original on 22 October 2020.
- Connolly, Kate (18 August 2002). "Gypsies' Fate Gaunts Film Muse of Hitler". The Guardian.
- Davis, David (12 September 2003). "Pro-Nazi Filmmaker Leni Riefenstahl, 101, Dies". The Forward.
- Ebert, Roger (24 June 1994). "The Wonderful, Horrible Life of Leni Riefenstahl". Chicago Sun-Times.
- Erickson, Hal (2014). "Triumph of the Will". Movies & TV Dept. The New York Times. Archived from the original on 16 September 2014.
- Fantz, Ashley (1 October 2002). "Happy Birthday, Leni Riefenstahl". Salon. Archived from the original on 8 March 2016.
- Falcon, Richard (9 September 2003). "Leni Riefenstahl". The Guardian.
- Graham, Cooper (1993). "Olympia in America, 1938: Leni Riefenstahl, Hollywood, and the Kristallnacht" (PDF). Library of Congress.
- Harris, Paul (29 April 2007). "Hollywood Tackles Hitler's Leni". The Guardian.
- "Her Films Glorified Hitler now Leni Riefenstahl's Story Hits the Screen". The Scotsman. 11 June 2012.
- "Hitler's Filmmaker Leni Riefenstahl Celebrates 101st Birthday". Haaretz. 22 August 2003. Archived from the original on 22 April 2016.
- "Hitler's Filmmaker to Release New Film". BBC News. 7 January 2002.
- James, Clive (25 March 2007). "Reich Star". The New York Times.
- Jagernauth, Kevin (11 March 2011). "Steven Soderbergh Reveals He Dropped A Leni Riefenstahl Biopic To Do 'Contagion' Instead". The Playlist.
- Kennicott, Phillip (29 November 2005). "Art of Justice: The Filmmakers at Nuremberg". The Washington Post.
- Kit, Borys (29 September 2014). "'Game of Thrones' Actress to Play Leni Riefenstahl in Jesse Owens Biopic". The Hollywood Reporter.
- Kramer, Hilton (9 February 1975). "The Evolution of Susan Sontag". The New York Times.
- "Leni Riefenstahl 1902–2003". HSC Online (Charles Sturt University). Archived from the original on 10 October 2014.
- "Leni Riefenstahl: The Casualty of Triumph". World Press Review. 22 August 2014.
- "Leni Riefenstahl Biography". University of Washington. 2008.
- "Leni Riefenstahl Biography". Leni Riefenstahl. 2001.
- "Leni Riefenstahl Hurt in Sudan Crash". BBC News. 1 March 2001.
- Mathews, Thomas. "Leni: The Life and Work of Leni Riefenstahl, by Steven Bach". The Independent.
- Morris, Gary (1 November 1999). "Lonesome Leni: Wonderful, Horrible Life of Leni Riefenstahl". Bright Lights Film Journal.
- Moore, Charles (10 September 2003). "Leni Riefenstahl". The Daily Telegraph.
- Müller, Ray (23 March 1999). The Wonderful, Horrible Life of Leni Riefenstahl (television documentary). Omega Film GmbH.
- "Nazi Propaganda Photos Withdrawn". BBC News. 25 June 2005.
- Riding, Alan (10 September 2003). "Leni Riefenstahl, 101, Dies; Film Innovator Tied to Hitler". The New York Times. ISSN 0362-4331.
- Rollyson, Carl (7 March 2007). "Leni Riefenstahl on Trial". The New York Sun. Archived from the original on 14 October 2008.
- Sontag, Susan (6 February 1975). "Fascinating Fascism". The New York Review of Books.
- "American Publicity Tour With Olympia". F-R Publishing Corporation. 2007.
- Robert, Douglas (31 August 2013). "The Unrepentant Leni Riefenstahl". Critics at Large.
- Smith, Sandra (11 September 2003). "What They Said About... Leni Riefenstahl". The Guardian.
- Steinberg, Stefan (15 September 2003). "Leni Riefenstahl – Propagandist For the Third Reich". International Committee of the Fourth International.
- "Triumph of the Will". The History Place. 2001.
- Trimborn, Jürgen (25 March 2007). "Leni Riefenstahl". The New York Times.
- "Valeria Schulczová, Roman Olekšák: Leni" (in Slovak). Slovenské Národné Divadlo (SND). 15 April 2014. Archived from the original on 4 March 2016.
- Whipp, Glenn (16 August 2009). "Quentin Tarantino's 'Basterds' Is a Glorious Mash-up". Los Angeles Times.
