= The People of Kau =

Book by Leni Riefenstahl

- Author: Leni Riefenstahl
- Original title: Die Nuba von Kau
- Translator: J. Maxwell Brownjohn
- Illustrator: Leni Riefenstahl
- Language: English (translated), German
- Genre: Illustrations
- Publisher: List (Germany); St. Martin's Press (US)
- Publication date: 1976
- Publication place: United States, Germany
- English publication date: 1976 and 1997
- Media type: Print (Hardback & Paperback)
- Pages: 224
- ISBN: 0-312-16963-9
- OCLC: 36842357
- Dewey Decimal: 306/.089965 21
- LC Class: DT155.2.N82 R5413 1997
- Preceded by: Die Nuba
- Followed by: Korallengärten

The People of Kau is the title of the 1976 English-language translation of German film director Leni Riefenstahl's Die Nuba von Kau, an illustrated book, published in the same year in Germany. The book is a follow-up to her earlier successful 1973 photo book Die Nuba.

== Synopsis ==
This is a photographic monograph on the life of the people of Kau in the southern part of Sudan. Riefenstahl spent 16 weeks with the Nuba of Kau in 1975. These people, known as the "South East Nuba", live only 100 miles away from the Mesakin Nuba. Yet, they speak another language, follow different customs, and are said to be very different in character and temperament. Their knife-fights, dances of love and elaborately painted faces and bodies are represented in the book.

== Background ==
Between 1962 and 1977, Riefenstahl had been photographing people of different Nuba ethnic groups in the southern part of Sudan on several visits. She was the first white female photographer who had obtained a special permission by the Sudanese government to do her research in the remote Nuba mountains of Sudan. She observed the Nuba's way of life and recorded it on film and in pictures. For some of her photographs and film scenes, she relied on Sudanese cameraman Gadalla Gubara, who accompanied her to the Nuba mountains.

Together with George Rodger's earlier photo essay on the Nuba and Latuka tribes, published in 1951 in National Geographic magazine, Riefenstahl's photographic documents are of anthropological, ethnological, and cultural-historical importance in relation to traditional life in the Nuba mountains of these times.

== Critical reception ==
The most well-known critical reaction to Riefenstahl's photography of the Nuba came from the American intellectual, Susan Sontag. Sontag scrutinized the "fascist aesthetics" of these photo essays in her widely read essay "Fascinating Fascism". Writing in the New York Review of Books in 1975, she stated: "The fascist dramaturgy centers on the orgiastic transactions between mighty forces and their puppets". She continued "Its choreography alternates between ceaseless motion and a congealed, static, 'virile' posing." Sontag wrote that the collection was the "final, necessary step in Riefenstahl's rehabilitation. It is the final rewrite of the past; or, for her partisans, the definitive confirmation that she was always a beauty-freak, rather than a horrid propagandist."

Academic studies, giving critical appraisals of Riefenstahl's books on the Nuba people, have been published by Alexandra Ludewig of the University of Western Australia and by anthropologist James C. Faris of the University of Connecticut. In his biography on Riefenstahl, the German media critic Rainer Rother gives a detailed account of her repeated visits to the Nuba people, comparing her approach to taking the photographs that seem to have started with a personal fascination of an African world, "unspoilt by civilization", up to her later carefully planned photo expeditions in order to further her fame as a photographer.

Another examination of both Riefenstahl's books and of James C. Faris's criticism was undertaken as a comment on a television film, called The Nuba from the BBC “Worlds Apart” ethnographic series. Here, the author John Ryle describes both the approach of the German photographer and of the anthropologist, trying to do justice to both. Also, he questions the attitude and moral judgements of the admirers of such "exotic pictures from Africa".

We feel guilt at the pleasure we take in their beauty and their sensuality. One reason for this is because we know that it is, to a significant extent, the forces unleashed on the world by our own civilisation that are destroying such cultures, even as we celebrate them.

— John Ryle, Invasion of the Bodysnatchers

== See also ==
- Nuba
- George Rodger
