= Born Free and Equal =

Book by Ansel Adams

Born Free and Equal: The Story of Loyal Japanese-Americans
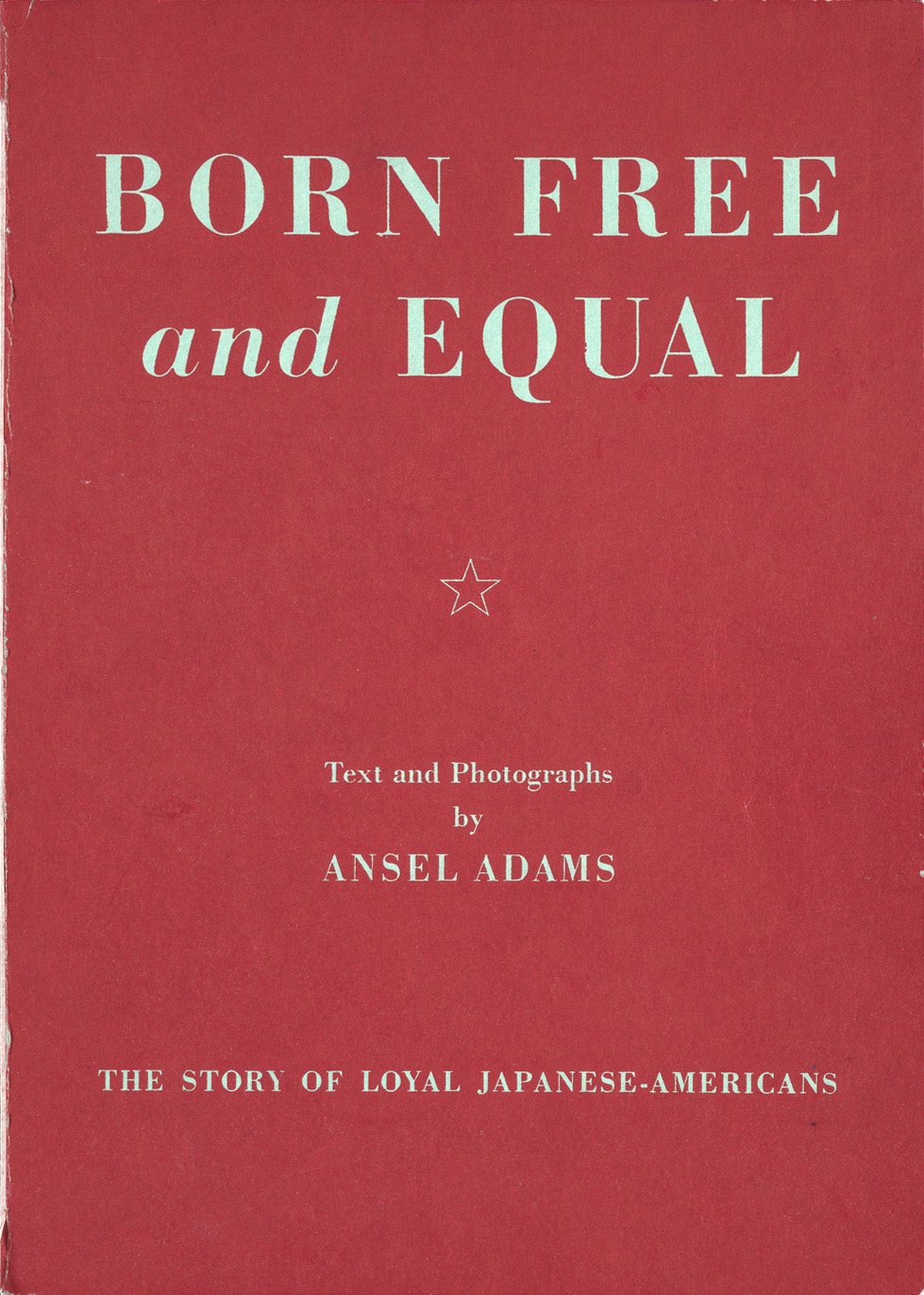
- Cover of the first edition, 1944
- Author: Ansel Adams
- Illustrator: Ansel Adams
- Language: English
- Subject: Internees at the Manzanar War Relocation Center, 1943–4.
- Genre: Photography books
- Publisher: U.S. Camera, New York
- Publication date: 1944
- Publication place: United States
- Media type: Hardcover
- Pages: 112 p. illus. (incl. ports.)

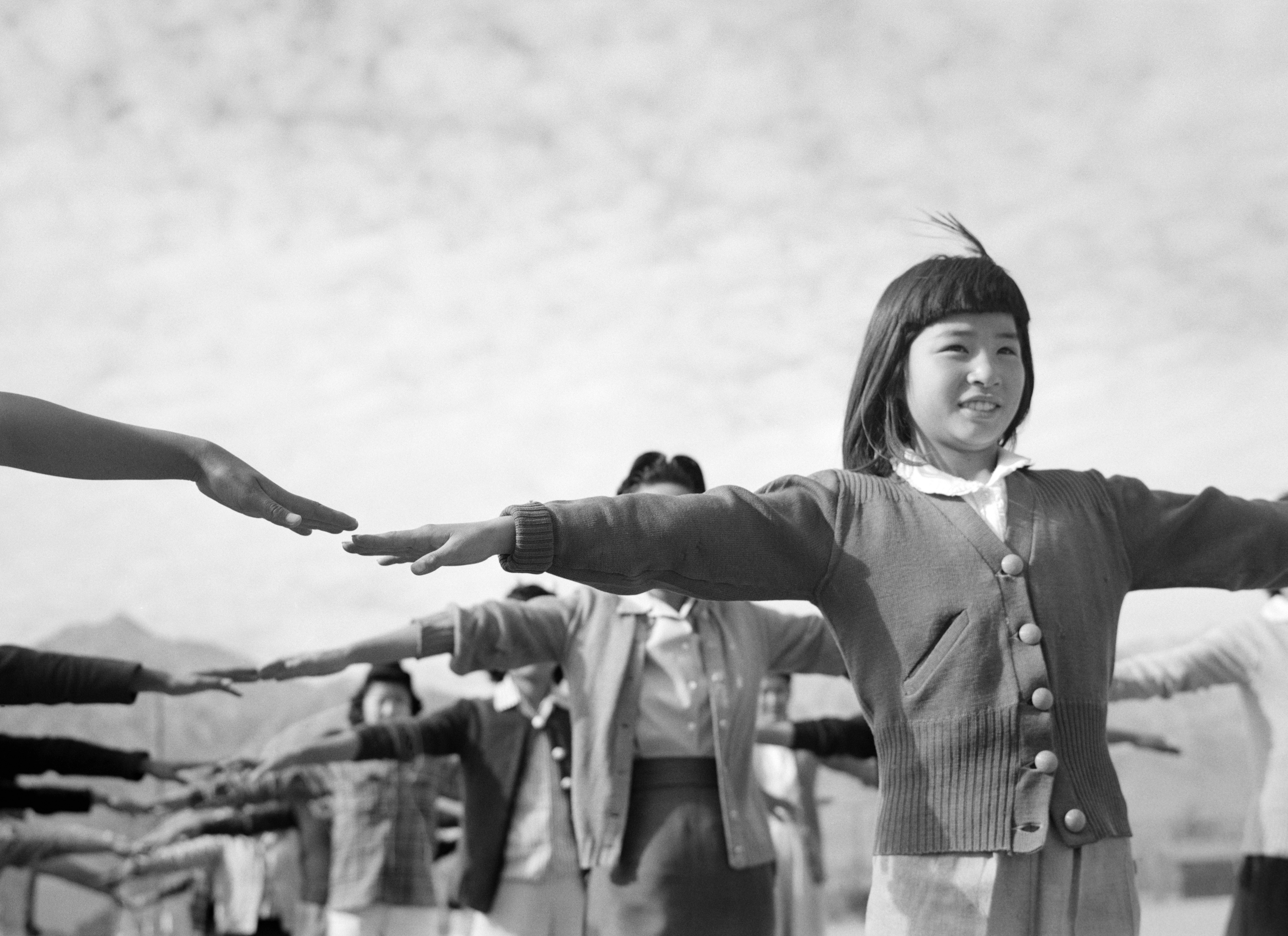
Camp life at Manzanar: Female internees practicing calisthenics, 1943

Born Free and Equal: The Story of Loyal Japanese-Americans is a book by Ansel Adams containing photographs from his 1943–1944 visit to the internment camp then named Manzanar War Relocation Center in Owens Valley, Inyo County, California. The book was published in 1944 by U.S. Camera in New York.

In the summer of 1943, Adams was invited by his friend, newly appointed camp director Ralph Merritt, to photograph life at the camp. The project and the accompanying book and exhibition at the MoMA created a significant amount of controversy, partly owing to the subject matter. World War II was still being fought and the animosity against Americans of Japanese descent was high, especially on the West Coast.

Adams was not the only photographer to take pictures in Manzanar. Before him, Dorothea Lange had visited all eleven Japanese-American internment camps while a staff photographer for the War Relocation Authority. During Lange's visit in 1942, the camp was a less organized state and Lange was driven to portray the injustice of the relocation project, leading to a harsher and less optimistic portrayal of camp life than Adams's. The third photographer was internee Toyo Miyatake, previously a studio photographer in Los Angeles. Miyatake initially took photos with an improvised camera fashioned from parts he smuggled into the camp. His activity was discovered after nine months, but Merritt supported the endeavor and allowed him to have his stored studio equipment shipped to the camp and continue the project (initially a camp guard had to release the shutter for him after Miyatake had positioned the camera). Miyatake and Adams met and befriended each other at the camp, while Lange's and Adams's visits did not overlap.

Adams's goal in the project was twofold: to stress the good American citizenship of the internees, as conveyed in the subtitle of the book, "The Story of Loyal Japanese-Americans"; and to show their ability to cope with the situation:

The purpose of my work was to show how these people, suffering under a great injustice, and loss of property, businesses and professions, had overcome the sense of defeat and dispair [sic] by building for themselves a vital community in an arid (but magnificent) environment…All in all, I think this Manzanar Collection is an important historical document, and I trust it can be put to good use. (Ansel Adams, 1965.)

Adams donated his collection of Manzanar photos to the Library of Congress in 1965. In 2001, Spotted Dog Press published an updated version of Born Free and Equal with a foreword by Archie Miyatake, son of Manzanar photographer Toyo Miyatake. The new version of the book has on the front cover a photo of Joyce Okazaki (née Nakamura), one of the children Adams photographed.
