= Vanishing Africa =

Photographic book by Leni Riefenstahl

- Author: Leni Riefenstahl
- Original title: Mein Afrika
- Illustrator: Leni Riefenstahl
- Language: English (translated), German
- Genre: Illustrations
- Publisher: List (Germany); Harmony (US)
- Publication date: 1982
- Publication place: United States, Germany
- English publication date: 1982
- Media type: Print (Hardback & Paperback)
- Pages: 232
- ISBN: 0-517-54914-X
- OCLC: 8587687
- Dewey Decimal: 779/.99676 19
- LC Class: DT365.19 .R53 1982
- Preceded by: Korallengärten

Vanishing Africa is the title of the 1982 English-language translation of German film director Leni Riefenstahl's Mein Afrika, a photographic book published in the same year in Germany. It was published by Harmony Books in the United States.

== Synopsis ==
The pictures are evidence of Riefenstahl's work as a photographer in Africa. According to the book, Riefenstahl wanted to capture the African traditional way of life before it lost its "innocence" to the modern age.
