= 21st International Emmy Awards =

1993 awards ceremony

- Location: New York Hilton Midtown, New York City
- Hosted by: Peter Ustinov

The 21st annual International Emmy Awards took place on November 22, 1993, in New York City. The award ceremony, presented by the International Academy of Television Arts and Sciences (IATAS), honors all programming produced and originally aired outside the United States.

== Ceremony ==
Eighteen programs were selected as finalists for the 21st Annual International Emmy Awards. Six of them are from the United Kingdom, a slightly lower percentage than in previous years. A record 269 programs from 35 countries were submitted for consideration.

The BBC was the big winner of the night, winning two of the six award categories. The International Academy of Television Arts and Sciences (IATAS) presented a total of eight awards. TV Miniseries Unnatural Pursuits, a BBC production in association with the Arts & Entertainment Network, won in the drama category. In the popular arts category, Absolutely Fabulous, a BBC TV production written by and starring Jennifer Saunders, shared the award with Channel Four Television's Drop the Dead Donkey.

A special award, the International Emmy Founders Award, went to Richard Dunn, chief executive of Thames Television, won for 'work recognized around the world'.

Other winners include The Wonderful, Horrible Life of Leni Riefenstahl, by Omega Films GmbH and Nomad Films (Germany/Belgium) (documentary art); Concert!, from Initial Films and Television Ltd. (United Kingdom) (performing arts); The Knife, by NOS/AVRO Bos Bros. (Netherlands) (children & young people program); Monika and Jonas: The Face of the Informer State, by NHK (Japan), and Disappearing World: We are all Neighbors, by Granada Television (UK) (co-winners, documentary).

== Winners ==
Best Drama	Best Popular Arts
Unnatural Pursuits - (United Kingdom) (BBC); Blueprint - (Sweden) (Sveriges Television); The Keiretsu - (Japan) (NHK)	Drop the Dead Donkey - (United Kingdom) (Channel 4); Absolutely Fabulous - (United Kingdom) (BBC); The Lion’s Roar: AIDS - (Netherlands) (VARA)
Best Arts Documentary	Best Documentary
The Wonderful, Horrible Life of Leni Riefenstahl - (Germany)/(Belgium)(Omega Film/Nomad Film); Miro - (Spain) (Televisión Española); Bortz, Bergman, and The Bacchae - (Sweden) (SVT)	We Are All Neighbours - (United Kingdom) (Granada TV); Monika and Jonas – The Face of the Informer State - (Japan) (NHK); Shackled Children - (France) (Metropole Television)
Best Performing Arts	Best Children & Young People Program
Concerto - (United Kingdom) (Initial Film and TV); The Vampyr: A Soap Opera - (United Kingdom) (BBC); Idomeneo - (Netherlands) (NOS)	Het Zakmes - (Netherlands) (AVRO); Round the Twist - (Australia) (ACTF); The Borrowers - (United Kingdom) (BBC)
