= The Wonderful, Horrible Life of Leni Riefenstahl =

- Poster
- Directed by: Ray Müller
- Written by: Ray Müller
- Produced by: Jacques de Clercq; Dimitri de Clercq; Waldemar Januszczak; Hans Peter Kochenrath; Hans-Jürgen Panitz
- Starring: Leni Riefenstahl
- Cinematography: Michel Baudour; Walter A. Franke; Ulrich Jänchen; Jürgen Martin
- Edited by: Vera Dubsikova; Beate Köster
- Music by: Ulrich Bassenge; Wolfgang Neumann
- Production companies: Arte; Channel Four Films; Nomad Films; Omega Film GmbH; ZDF
- Distributed by: Kino
- Release date: 11 September 1993 (TIFF)
- Running time: 188 minutes
- Country: Germany
- Language: German
- Box office: $449,707 (USA)

The Wonderful, Horrible Life of Leni Riefenstahl (German: Die Macht der Bilder: Leni Riefenstahl, "The Power of Images: Leni Riefenstahl") is a 1993 German documentary film about the life of German film director Leni Riefenstahl, directed by Ray Müller.

== Production ==
Riefenstahl was best known for her documentary film Olympia (1938), on the 1936 Summer Olympics in Berlin and her Nazi propaganda films, Der Sieg des Glaubens (1933), Triumph of the Will (1935), and Tag der Freiheit (1935), which are regarded by historians as among the greatest propaganda films of all time.

The United States release of this film, in 1993, coincided with the publication of Riefenstahl's autobiography Leni Riefenstahl: A Memoir (New York, 1993), as well as with her ninetieth birthday. The two releases are not unrelated. The Wonderful, Horrible Life of Leni Riefenstahl was born from an idea of Riefenstahl herself, who, motivated by her old age and already working on her memoirs, decided to commission a documentary about her life.

Concerned about being associated with the 'Nazi director', eighteen filmmakers declined the project, before Müller agreed to portray Riefenstahl in what ended up being a three-hour-long documentary (three times its contract length).

The length of the film is therefore the result of a decision by the director: Müller justifies it as an attempt to give a fair representation of Riefenstahl's life, which cannot be reduced to the eight years she worked for the Nazi regime, but presents much more interesting stories and facts that are relevant to understand her personality. Showing more historical material about her life, according to Müller, also helps to compensate the strong image of herself that Riefenstahl tries to impose throughout the movie, giving the viewer a better chance to draw their own conclusions. The Wonderful, Horrible Life of Leni Riefenstahl encapsulates a historical figure at the end of her life. Through this film, it is shown how Riefenstahl dealt with the repercussions of her early work.

== Reception ==
External videos
- Charlie Rose interview with Bud Greenspan, Andrew Sarris, Annette Insdorf, and John Simon on The Wonderful Horrible Life of Leni Riefenstahl, March 29, 1994

The film garnered a strong critical response. It currently has a 95% rating amongst critics cited on the Rotten Tomatoes film review website.

"This movie is fascinating in so many different ways: As the story of an extraordinary life, as the reconstruction of the career of one of the greatest of film artists, as the record of an ideological debate, as a portrait of an amazing old woman." Roger Ebert, Chicago Sun-Times

"Consistently fascinating documentary... This very significant film is the fablelike story of a woman whose search for the ideal, not unlike Ms. Riefenstahl's search in a very different world, leads to disaster." Vincent Canby, New York Times

"A fascinating if irritating and ultimately unsatisfactory 1993 German documentary[...] It's important to know that this film was made at Riefenstahl's own instigation, clearly designed to accompany her then recently published autobiography, and that she had veto power over who would be interviewed (don't expect to see Susan Sontag here). Consequently this is more often self-portrait than portrait [...] [If] artistic integrity has nothing to do with humanity, this is the movie you've been waiting for. Incidentally, the film's stupid title was coined strictly for the Anglo-American market; the original German title translates as "Leni Riefenstahl: The Power of Images."" Jonathan Rosenbaum, Chicago Reader

=== Accolades ===
It won an Emmy Award at the 21st International Emmy Awards in 1993, for Arts Documentary. Ray Müller won the Golden Space Needle Award for best documentary at the Seattle International Film Festival in 1994.

== See also ==
- Riefenstahl - 2024 documentary
