= The Last of the Nuba =

Book by Leni Riefenstahl

- Author: Leni Riefenstahl
- Original title: Die Nuba
- Illustrator: Leni Riefenstahl
- Language: English (translated), German
- Genre: Illustrations
- Publisher: (Germany) List (1973) (US) Harper and Row (1974), St. Martin's Press (1995)
- Publication date: 1973
- Publication place: United States, Germany
- English publication date: 1974 and 1995
- Media type: Print (Hardback & Paperback)
- Pages: 208
- ISBN: 0-312-13642-0
- OCLC: 32746545
- Dewey Decimal: 779/.99626/4 20
- LC Class: DT133.N78 R5313 1995
- Followed by: Die Nuba von Kau

The Last of the Nuba is the English-language title of German film director Leni Riefenstahl's 1973 Die Nuba, a book of photographs, published a year later in the United States. It was an international bestseller and was followed up by the 1976 book Die Nuba von Kau. It was the subject of a famous critique by Susan Sontag claiming that it adhered to a "fascist aesthetic".

== Overview ==
Between 1962 and 1977, Riefenstahl had been photographing people of different Nuba ethnic groups in the southern part of Sudan on several visits. She was the first white female photographer who had obtained a special permission by the Sudanese government to do her research in the remote Nuba mountains of Sudan. She observed the Nuba's way of life and recorded it on film and in pictures. For some of her photographs and film scenes, she relied on Sudanese cameraman Gadalla Gubara, who accompanied her to the Nuba mountains.

Together with George Rodger's earlier photo essay on the Nuba and Latuka tribes, published in 1951 in National Geographic magazine, Riefenstahl's photographic documents are of anthropological, ethnological, and cultural-historical importance in relation to traditional life in the Nuba mountains of these times.

== Reception ==
In her native Germany, the Art Director's Club of Germany awarded Riefenstahl a gold medal for the best photographic achievement of 1975.

Shortly after its 1974 release in America, the critic Susan Sontag scrutinized the "fascist aesthetics" of the works in her essay "Fascinating Fascism". Writing in the New York Review of Books in 1975, she stated: "The fascist dramaturgy centers on the orgiastic transactions between mighty forces and their puppets". She continued "Its choreography alternates between ceaseless motion and a congealed, static, 'virile' posing. Sontag wrote that the collection was the "final, necessary step in Riefenstahl's rehabilitation. It is the final rewrite of the past; or, for her partisans, the definitive confirmation that she was always a beauty-freak rather than a horrid propagandist."

In December 1974, American writer and photographer Eudora Welty reviewed the book positively for the New York Times, giving a personal account of the aesthetics of Riefenstahl's book:

She uses the light purposefully: the full, blinding brightness to make us see the all-absorbing blackness of the skin; the ray of light slanting down from the single hole, high in the wall, that is the doorway of the circular house, which tells us how secret and safe it has been made; the first dawn light streaking the face of a calf in the sleeping camp where the young men go to live, which suggests their world apart. All the pictures bring us the physical beauty of the people: a young girl, shy and mischievous of face, with a bead sewn into her lower lip like a permanent cinnamon drop; a wrestler prepared for his match, with his shaven head turned to look over the massive shoulder, all skin color taken away by a coating of ashes.

— Eudora Welty, Africa And Paris And Russia

Academic studies, giving critical appraisals of Riefenstahl's books on the Nuba people, have been published by Alexandra Ludewig of the University of Western Australia and by anthropologist James C. Faris of the University of Connecticut. In his biography on Riefenstahl, the German media critic Rainer Rother gives a detailed account of her repeated visits to the Nuba people, comparing her approach to taking the photographs that seem to have started with a personal fascination of an African world, "unspoilt by civilization", up to her later carefully planned photo expeditions in order to further her fame as a photographer.

Another examination of both Riefenstahl's books and of James C. Faris's criticism was undertaken as a comment on a television film, called The Nuba from the BBC “Worlds Apart” ethnographic series. Here, the author John Ryle describes both the approach of the German photographer and of the anthropologist, trying to do justice to both. Also, he questions the attitude and moral judgements of the admirers of such "exotic pictures from Africa".

We feel guilt at the pleasure we take in their beauty and their sensuality. One reason for this is because we know that it is, to a significant extent, the forces unleashed on the world by our own civilisation that are destroying such cultures, even as we celebrate them.

— John Ryle, Invasion of the Bodysnatchers

== See also ==
- Nuba
- George Rodger
