= Live in Krefeld =

Krefelder Appell - Keine Atomraketen

Live album by Nina Hagen
- Released: 2001
- Recorded: September 2, 2001
- Genre: Pop; rock; mantra; post-punk; dance
- Length: 65:25
- Label: Storck
- Producer: Terry Red

Nina Hagen chronology
Return of the Mother (2000)	Krefelder Appell - Keine Atomraketen (2001)	Big Band Explosion (2003)

Krefelder Appell - Keine Atomraketen by Nina Hagen was recorded at Kulturfabrik in Krefeld on September 2, 2001 and released later that year.

== Track listing ==
1. "Schritt für Schritt ins Paradies" previously unreleased
2. "Schachmatt" originally from Return of the Mother
3. "Revolution" previously unreleased
4. "Frequenzkontrolle" originally from Return of the Mother
5. "Das Veilchen" previously unreleased
6. "Höllenzug" originally from Return of the Mother
7. "Zero Zero U.F.O." originally from FreuD euch
8. "Tiere" originally from FreuD euch
9. "African Reggae" originally from Unbehagen
10. "Nina 4 President" originally from Street
11. "Revolution Ballroom" originally from Revolution Ballroom
12. "I'm Gonna Live the Life" originally from Revolution Ballroom
13. "My Sweet Lord" previously unreleased
14. "Born to Die in Berlin" originally from BeeHappy
15. "Der Wind hat mir ein Lied erzählt" originally from Return of the Mother
16. "Pank" originally from Nina Hagen Band
17. "My Way" originally from Nina Hagen in Ekstasy
18. "Freiheitslied" originally from FreuD euch
19. "Riesenschritt" originally from FreuD euch
20. "Ska" previously unreleased
21. "Deutschland ich liebe Dich" previously unreleased
22. "TV-Glotzer (White Punks On Dope)" originally from Nina Hagen Band
23. "Ave Maria" originally from Nina Hagen

Information about releases refers to official Nina Hagen albums
