= Villa Carlshagen =

Historic house in Potsdam, Germany

Coordinates: 52°22′52″N 13°01′15″E

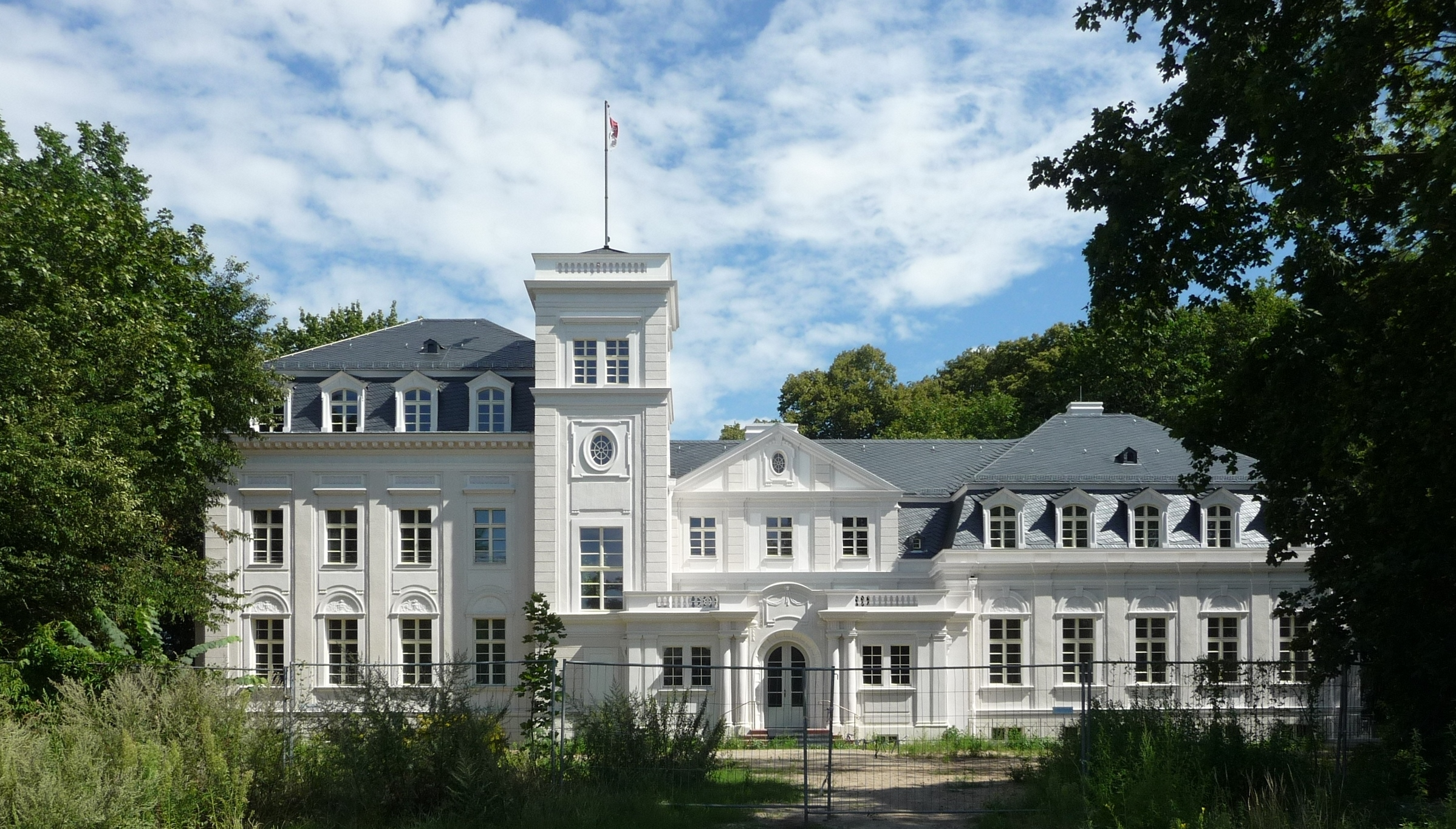
Villa Carlshagen, 2016.

Villa Carlshagen, also known as Villa Karlshagen, is a protected monument at Olympischer Weg 1 in Potsdam, Germany. The villa is located directly on the Templiner See. It is named in honor of its former owner, the Berlin banker Carl Hagen. It is a residential building designed by the architect Friedrich Wilhelm Göhre in the Neoclassical style.

== Previous building ==
In the 1800s, the Berlin freight forwarder Moreau Ballette purchased a plot of land on the Templiner See owned by the Potsdam merchant Meyer Isaac Cohn. The property stretched from what was then Louisenstraße (now Zeppelinstraße) to the shores of the Templiner See. In 1870, Ballette had a small tower villa built on the property, constructed by the Potsdam bricklayer Otto Held. In 1875, Ballette enlarged the property by purchasing more land from Westend-Potsdam-Baubank-AG, which had collapsed in the wake of the Panic of 1873. Otto Held lived in the house from 1889 to 1899.

== History ==
The property was purchased by the Berlin banker Carl Levy in 1900. In 1906, Carl Hagen changed his name to Carl Levy. In 1909/1910, Hagen had the villa constructed as the Hagen family's primary summer residence. Hagen was the father of the banker Hermann Carl Hagen who was murdered at Sachsenhausen concentration camp and grandfather of the writer and Holocaust survivor Hans Oliva-Hagen. His great-granddaughter and great-great-granddaughter are the singer Nina Hagen and actress Cosma Shiva Hagen. Carl Hagen died in 1938 at age 81. The Hagen family used the villa until 1938, when the Nazi regime forced the Hagen family to sell the villa and surrounding 65,000 square meters of land to the city of Potsdam.

During the era of the German Democratic Republic (East Germany), the villa was used as the location of a radiology clinic. After 1990, the villa stood empty for several years and had fallen into a state of disrepair. In 1995, the building was designed as a protected monument.

Since 2019, the HMU Health and Medical University's Potsdam campus has maintained a study location at Villa Carlshagen.
