= Om Namah Shivay (album) =

Studio album by Nina Hagen
- Released: February 11, 1999
- Recorded: 1998
- Genre: Hindu Devotional Music
- Producer: Nina Hagen

Nina Hagen chronology
freuD euch / BeeHappy (1995/96)	Om Namah Shivay (1999)	Return of the Mother (2000)

Om Namah Shivay is the eighth solo (and tenth overall) studio album by Nina Hagen, released on February 11, 1999. It is a compilation of Hindu bhajans (devotional songs), incorporating mantras and prayers in song form.

== Track listing ==
1. "Shank Invocation, Ganesha Mantra and Om with Digeridoo" – 2:46
2. "From Durga Saptashati (700 Names in Praise of Mother Durga)" – 1:59
3. "Shri Siddha Siddeshvari Mata Haid Akandeshvariji Aarati!" – 4:43
4. "Mrityunjaya Mantra" – 1:41
5. "Jai Mata Kali Jai Mata Durge!" – 4:34
6. "Hare Krisna Hare Rama!" – 5:31
7. "He Shiva Shankara" – 5:46
8. "Om Namah Shivay!" – 5:45
9. "Gayatri Mantra!" – 1:30
10. "Oh Mata Haidhakandeshvari!" – 5:16
11. "Sankirtana!" – 7:53
12. "Hara Hara Amarnatha Gange" – 6:23
13. "Shanti Mantra" – 1:45

Bonus tracks: 1008 Indische Nächte Live

1. "Shiva shambu" – 5:51
2. "Jay Mata Kali Mata Durge" – 3:28
3. "Amba Bhadjan" – 5:33
4. "Shiva Shiva Mahadeva" – 4:16
5. "Hare Krisna Hare Rama" – 3:51
6. "Jay Bajaranga Bali Jay Hanuman" – 5:19
7. "He Shiva Shankara" – 3:46
8. "Only Love can Save your Life" – 4:47
9. "Shiva Bhajan" 6:46
10. "Sankirtana" – 6:12
11. "Jay Shambu" – 5:15
12. "No Poison" – 3:38
13. "Bonus Movie" – 4:02

Notes

- "Sankirtana" has been previously recorded as "Omhaidakhandi" on Revolution Ballroom
- "He Shiva Shankara" has been previously recorded as "Shiva" on BeeHappy

== Personnel ==
Adapted from AllMusic.

- Brigitte Angerhausen – engineer
- Tom Deininger – assistant
- Nina Hagen – vocals, producer
- Ingo Krauss – engineer, mixing
