= Volksbeat =

Studio album by Nina Hagen
- Released: November 11, 2011
- Genres: Punk, rock
- Length: 41:18
- Label: Koch Universal
- Producers: Peter Schmidt, Peter Hinterthür

Nina Hagen chronology
Personal Jesus (2010)	Volksbeat (2011)	Unity (2022)

Volksbeat is the thirteenth solo (and fifteenth overall) studio album by Nina Hagen, released on November 11, 2011 by Koch Universal. It is the first all-German Nina Hagen album since 1995's FreuD Euch and contains covers as well as original songs.

== Background ==
In 2011 Hagen announced she was working on a "German language rock-album, very political, very personal, also spiritual," produced by Peter Schmidt and Peter Hinthertür, initially due in mid-October. The album was eventually delayed to November 11.

Musically, Volksbeat has been described as "a return to rock".

The title translates to "folk beat". Hagen explained the reason of the title was "because the heartbeat of a people, the rhythm of a nation, compose its songs." She added, "We are the people - Patti Smith has said it. Power to the people - John Lennon. We are the people. Period. We are the people of a good spirit, a people of love, a people of peace and freedom. And now we have to fight to regain that with the only weapon that amounts to anything: with our love."

Hagen was involved in creating the artwork of the album from collages made by her and her friends. “We worked with an original collage from the artist Bruna Kahr and we threw more flower power into it, also in reference to Jesus and the power of the flower. We decorated with jumping fish and peace-doves and flowers like the lily of the valley, the rose of Sharon, the forget me not and lilac,” she explained.

== Composition ==
Volksbeat follows the Jesus-oriented theme of her previous album Personal Jesus as well as dealing with civil rights, anti-establishment, anti-war and anti-nuclear power icons and movements. Hagen explained the album was an attempt to bring relevance to "sing and shout for peace, for love and compassion, for freedom against war and injustice, embracing our ancestors" through the songs of artists that fought for the same ideals. It contains ten covers as well as five original songs. The English-language covers were translated in German by Hagen, who described the process as "a funtastik experience". Hagen admitted to being influenced by '70s music, conceding "all those songs of protest from the past have lost none of their relevance."

The first track, "Bitten der Kinder & An meine Landsleute", is a cover of two songs by Bertolt Brecht and is exemplary of Hagen's message on the album to ask for truth and peace. She described it as "a battle-cry, an outcry, a plea for disarmament and the de-escalation of tensions - that we commit ourselves to respecting human rights." The songs are children’s prayers for peace and Hagen composed a new arrangement for them.

"Killer" is a cover of the 1990's track by English producer Adamski and Seal. Hagen had previously collaborated with Adamski on her 1991 songs "Keep It Live" and "All 4 Franckie", released on Street, and on the 1992 single "Get Your Body". She later performed the song in English and had it remixed by Adamski.

"Soma Koma" was inspired by the works of George Orwell and Aldous Huxley, "with their terrible visions of the human race being genetically manipulated, in which there is a slave race and everything is controlled, everyone has chips - we are growing into such a horror scenario right now if we don't inform ourselves and unite." It was co-written by Warner Poland, who would go on to collaborate with Hagen on her following album, Unity, released in 2022.

== Release and promotion ==
In October 2011, Volksbeat was announced for a release on November 11. Later that year, an official website with a sampler of the tracks from the album appeared.

Right after the album's release, Hagen embarked on a promotional tour in Germany and France. No singles were released from the album, although the English version of "Killer", remixed by Adamski and titled "No Killer Animals", received an animated music video.

== Track listing ==
No.	Title	Writer(s)	Length
1.	"Bitten der Kinder & An meine Landsleute"	Bertolt Brecht, Thomas Götz, Nina Hagen	2:16
2.	"Ick lass mir doch vom Teufel nich..." (Cover of "Why Should The Devil Have All Good Music" by Larry Norman)	Norman, Hagen	2:30
3.	"Killer" (Cover of "Killer" by Adamski)	Adamski, Seal	3:18
4.	"Ermutigung" (Cover of Ermutigung by Wolf Biermann)	Biermann	2:04
5.	"Ich bin"	Justin Balk, Hagen	1:55
6.	"Das 5. Gebot"	Götz, Hagen, Martin Luther	3:02
7.	"Menschen sind kompatibel"	Stefan Knoess	3:28
8.	"Wir sind das Volk"	Hagen, Bernd Kurtzke	2:32
9.	"Soma Koma"	Wolfgang Glum, Hagen, Petra Jansen, Warner Poland	2:50
10.	"Jesus ist ein Freund von mir" (Cover of "Jesus Is A Friend Of Mine" by Sonseed)	Hagen, Salvatore Polichetti	2:51
11.	"Süßes, süßes Lied der Errettung" (Cover of "Sweet, Sweet Song of Salvation" by Larry Norman)	Hagen, Norman	3:06
12.	"Keiner von uns ist frei" (Cover of "None of Us Are Free" by Solomon Burke)	Hagen, Barry Mann, Brenda Russell, Cynthia Weil	3:51
13.	"Noch Ein Tässchen Kaffee" (Cover of "One More Cup of Coffee (Valley Below)" by Bob Dylan)	Dylan, Hagen	3:33
14.	"Nicht vergessen" (Cover of "Let's Not Forget" by Curtis Mayfield)	Hagen, Arnold Hennings, Mayfield	3:56
15.	"Dieser Zug fährt Richtung Freiheit" (Hidden track; cover of the traditional song "This Train Is Bound For Glory")	Woodie Guthrie, Hagen	4:10
Total length:			41:18
