= Tangowerk =

Tangowerk (2011)

Studio album by Nhoah
- Released: May 2011
- Genre: Electronic music; Tango
- Producer: Nhoah

Nhoah chronology
"Excess All Areas" (2014)	Tangowerk (2011) (2011)

Tangowerk is a project by Berlin-based music producer, composer and artist Nhoah. Its main musical influences are Argentine tango and the Electronic music sounds of Berlin.

== Background ==
Travels to Buenos Aires in 2005 sparked the initial inspiration for the creation of the project. Over the span of the next five years, many international artists in Berlin and Buenos Aires were recorded to eventually finalise the 14 tracks for the debut album carrying the same name as the project: Tangowerk. Besides electro and tango themes, audio aesthetics based on the Golden Twenties took strong musical influence.

The album was mostly recorded in the famous Estudios ION in Buenos Aires where artists such as Astor Piazzolla or Osvaldo Pugliese had been recording. Back in Berlin, modular synthesizer, analog gramophones, radios and reel-to-reel tape recorders as well as state of the art technical post processing applications were implemented to create the unique, intermodal, amalgamated soundscape.

Featured Argentine vocalists include Tango icon Adriana Varela, singer Walter "Chino" Laborde and Karina Beorlegui as well as rapper El Topo. They were joined by Berlin-based singer Mieze Katz, Ina Viola and Lulu Schmidt, as well as Australian performance artist Headvoice and Crooner Louie Austen from Vienna. Collaboration with the Berlin Comedian Harmonists further impressed the musical touch of the 1920s.

String and Bandoneon sections were played by Charly Pacini, Federico Terranova, Pablo Gignoli, Julio Coviello, Bruno Giuntini, Pablo Jivotovschii and Alfredo Zuccarelli, members of the Avantgarde Tango Orchestra Fernández Fierro. The horn section of the song 1-2-3 was performed by the big band Ed Partyka Jazz Orchestra.

The entire creational process was documented by video artist Carola Schmidt. She directed and produced a respective documentary titled Tangowerk by Nhoah. und sechs Musik- und Tanzvideos.

Tangowerk was internationally published in May 2011 as a CD+DVD along with a 64- page booklet and one hour of video content.

After the first official show at Niceto Club in Buenos Aires with Compañía Inestable of Clubabends Club69 (serving as the foundation for the complimentary music video for the first single releaseDancing On The Volcano), performances at the Japanese fundraiser Ki.Zuna at Maria am Ostbahnhof, at Arte Lounge (First Broadcast: 13 December 2011) and at Kino Babylon (on December 15, 2011) followed. The later involved a one-hour-long live show announced by the premiere of Carola Schmidt's movie documentary and a screening of her award-winning short film Wir bitten Dich, verführe uns!

The title Alone With Ourselves was created in collaboration with artist The Oracle (Dr. Daniel Dahm), addressing issues of ecological and anthropological sustainability.

Tangowerk's latest album Excess All Areas was released in 2014 by R.O.T Records. Its main musical inspirations are Techno, the party music of Berlin in the 90's, Tangowerk's live performances as well as the daily news. Five new members joined the collective: Lulu Schmidt, Ina Viola, Staab, Hajo Rehm und Y3ars. They toured and performed internationally, e.g. in the USA. Their live performances continue to be supported by a diverse mix of high tech applications, extravagant costumes and visuals as well as culturally infused concept art.

== Discography ==
=== Albums ===
Year	Title
2014	Excess All Areas
2011	Tangowerk

=== Singles ===
Year	Title	Featuring
2015	All and All	Ina Viola
2014	Emergency	Lulu Schmidt
2014	Love&Win	Y3ARS
2014	Geld/Bling	MIA.
2012	Innocent	Lulu Schmidt
2011	Dancing on the Volcano	Headvoice
2011	Tuyo Soy/Ob Ich Dir Treu Sein Kann	Walter "Chino" Laborde, Berlin Comedian Harmonists, Karina Beorlegui
