= Unity (Nina Hagen album) =

Studio album by Nina Hagen
- Released: December 9, 2022
- Length: 43:21
- Languages: English, German
- Label: Grönland
- Producers: Nina Hagen, Sasha Perera, Warner Poland, Michael Wolff

Nina Hagen chronology
Volksbeat (2011)	Unity (2022)	Highway to Heaven (2026)

Singles from Unity
- 1. "Unity" Released: 2020; 2. "Shadrack" Released: 2022; 3. "16 Tons" Released: 2022; 4. "United Women Of The World" Released: 2022

Unity is the fourteenth solo (and sixteenth overall) studio album by Nina Hagen, released on December 9, 2022, via Grönland records. The album was preceded by the singles "Unity", "Shadrack", "16 tons" and "United Women of the World".

== Background and composition ==
Unity is a rock pop album with country and electronic elements and among its themes are biblical miracles and politics. The album is the singer's first studio album since Volksbeat in 2011 and her first album featuring English songs since 2010's Personal Jesus. It was released on streaming platforms, CD, LP and also on limited edition purple coloured vinyl LP.

Album opener "Shadrack" tells the Bible story of three Hebrew men saved by God from death. "United Women of the World" was co-written by Jamaican singer Liz Mitchell and English-American singer Lene Lovich and was described in a press statement as "a feminist punk reggae anthem of solidarity".

The reggae-influenced title-track features George Clinton and is a homage to the Black Lives Matter movement. It was written after the murder of George Floyd. Hagen said the song is "about the indestructible dream of charity. From the longing for human values, for social unity and justice.” The song quotes the Coretta Scott King line from the book My Life with Martin Luther King Jr.: "Freedom is never really won. You earn it and win it in every generation."

"16 Tons" is a cover of the 1946 folk classic "Sixteen Tons", telling the story of the Kentucky coal miners who worked themselves to the bone. The song “Atomwaffensperrvertrag” is explicitly political and samples a speech Hagen gave in 2009 at the United Nation Freedom Festival and a United Nations speech from American politician Dennis Kucinich.

The album features the cover of "Redemption Day" by Sheryl Crow and a German cover of "Blowin' in the Wind" by Bob Dylan (“Die Antwort weiss ganz allein der Wind”). "It Doesn't Matter Now" is a duet with Irish singer Bob Geldof.

== Release and promotion ==
On September 4, 2020, Nina Hagen released the single "Unity" and announced she would release a new album in 2021 via Grönland records. On September 25, the "Reconciliation Vibration mix" of the song was released. The single was followed by album opener "Shadrack", released on January 28, 2022. On October 12, a third single, "16 tons", was released with a music video directed by Sebastian Vogt. On the same day, Hagen also revealed the album's title, track list and its release date. On November 17, "United Women of the World", the album's fourth single, was released with a music video directed by Timothy Wiehn.

On December 9, the day of album release, "It Doesn't Matter Now" was released as fifth single, after being teased on socials two days prior. On December 19, the Agar Agar remix of "Unity" was released as digital single.

== Critical reception ==
Professional ratings
Review scores
Source	Rating
Rolling Stone Germany	3/5 stars
The Guardian	2/5 stars
The Telegraph	3/5 stars

Daniel Dylan Wray of The Guardian rated the album two out of five, criticizing it for its weak political message and lack of cohesion. Gunther Reinhardt of Rolling Stone Germany was more positive, rating the album three out of five and complimenting Hagen's delivery on the tracks "Geld, Geld, Geld" and "It Doesn't Matter Now". Arwa Haider of The Telegraph also gave the album three out of five, commending the variety of guests featured on the songs and the ability of Hagen to bring cohesiveness to the album.

== Track listing ==
Unity track listing
No.	Title	Writer(s)	Producer	Length
1.	"Shadrack"	Robert MacGimsey	Nina Hagen, Warner Poland	3:42
2.	"United Women of the World"	Hagen	Michael Wolff	3:10
3.	"Unity"	George Clinton, Hagen, Tequila Mockingbird, Poland	Hagen, Poland	3:32
4.	"16 Tons"	Merle Travis	Hagen, Poland	2:38
5.	"Atomwaffensperrvertrag"	Hagen, Sasha Perera	Perera	3:54
6.	"Gib mir deine Liebe"	Hagen, Perera	Perera	3:08
7.	"Venusfliegenfalle"	Hagen, Poland	Poland	3:24
8.	"Redemption Day"	Sheryl Crow	Poland	4:19
9.	"Geld, Geld, Geld"	Hagen, Poland	Poland	4:25
10.	"Die Antwort weiss ganz allein der Wind"	Bob Dylan, Hans Bradtke	Poland	3:17
11.	"Open My Heart (Dinner Time)"	Hagen, Poland	Poland	4:35
12.	"It Doesn't Matter Now"	Bob Geldof	Wolff	3:17
Total length:				43:21

== Charts ==
Chart performance for Unity
Chart (2022)	Peak position
German Albums (Offizielle Top 100)	30
Swiss Albums (Schweizer Hitparade)	27
