= Irgendwo auf der Welt =

"Irgendwo auf der Welt" ("Somewhere in the World") ("In a year - In a day" is the title of the English version) is a song composed by Werner Richard Heymann for the 1932 movie A Blonde Dream (Ein blonder Traum). The lyrics are by Robert Gilbert.

Originally performed in the movie by Anglo-German actress Lilian Harvey, it gained popularity as one of the most renowned songs by the German 1920s and 1930s sextet, the Comedian Harmonists.

It voices a sentimental longing for a yet undiscovered place where peace of mind and true happiness can be found.

The song has also been part of the repertoire of the new Berlin Comedian Harmonists ensemble since it was formed in 1997.

In 2006, German singer Nina Hagen used this name as the title for her album of covers of swing / jazz classics.
