= Carl Levy (banker) =

German banker and philanthropist (1856–1938)

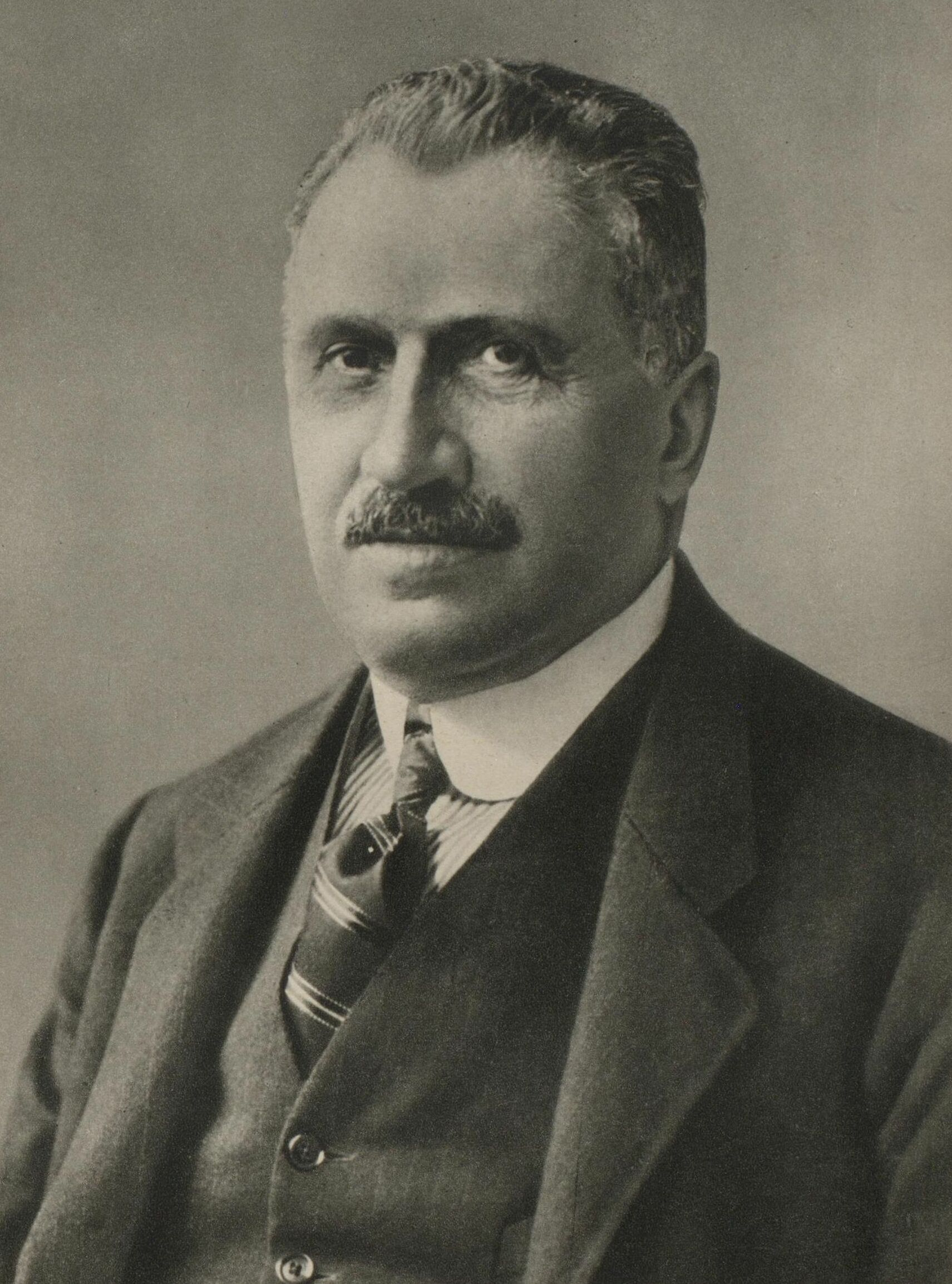
- Born: 28 June 1856; Berlin, Kingdom of Prussia
- Died: 30 January 1938 (aged 81); Germany
- Other names: Carl Hagen
- Occupation: Banker
- Spouse: Katharina Philippi
- Relatives: Hermann Carl Hagen, Hans Oliva-Hagen, Nina Hagen, Cosma Shiva Hagen

Carl Levy (28 June 1856 – 30 January 1938) also known as Carl Hagen, was a German Jewish banker and philanthropist.

== Personal life ==
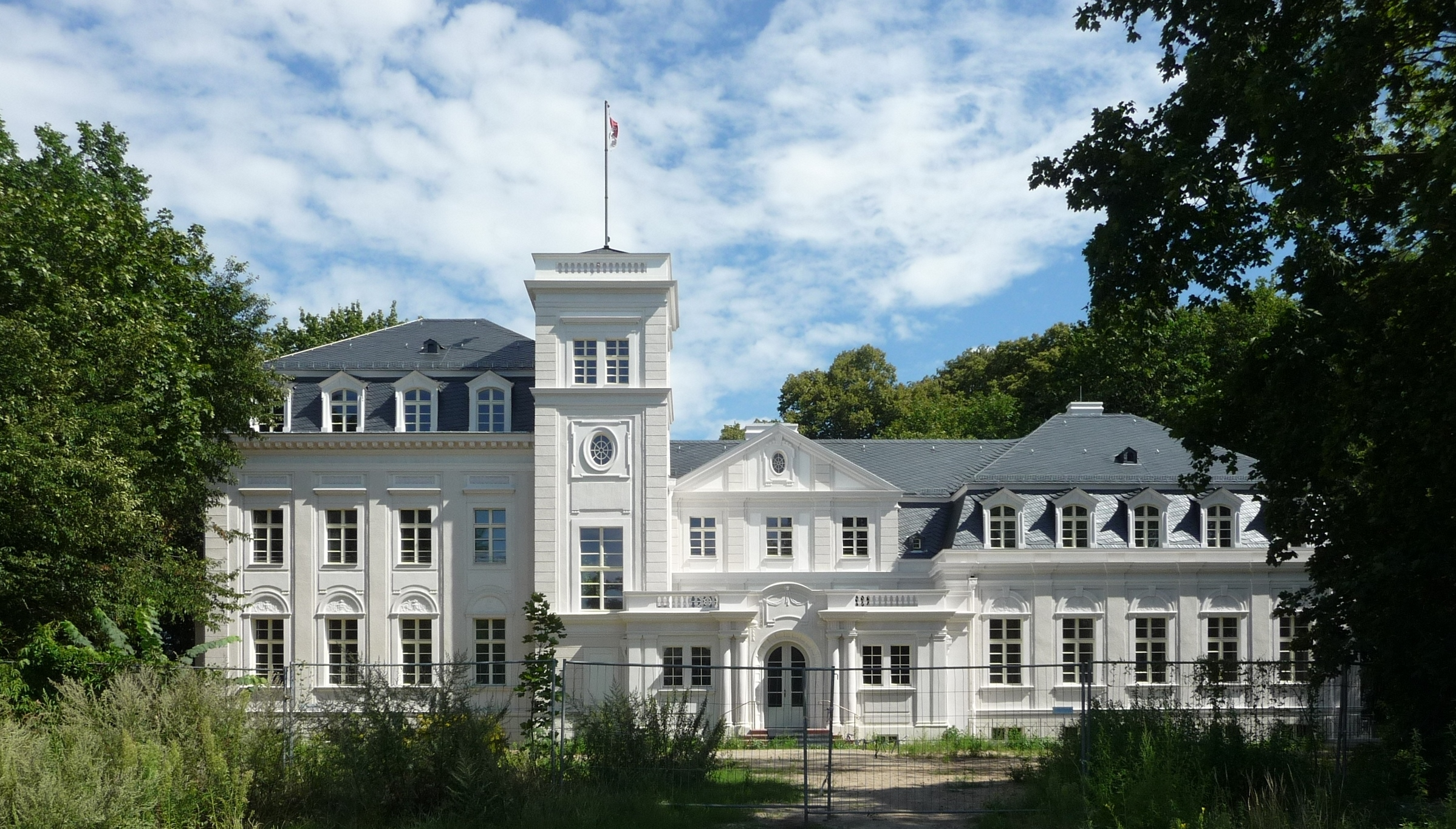
Villa Carlshagen, 2016.

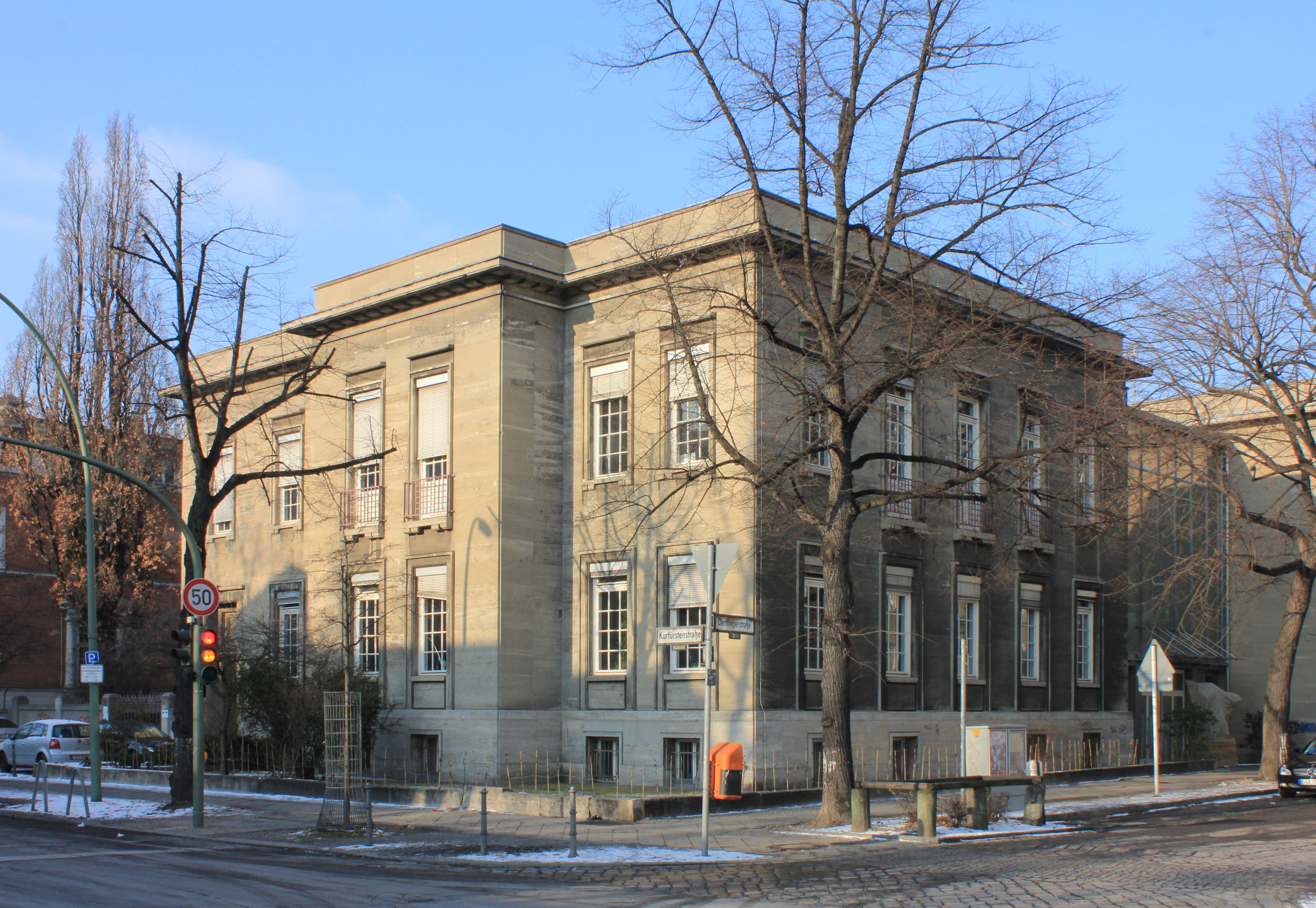
Former home of Carl Hagen in Berlin-Tiergarten, 2012.

Carl Levy was born into a Cologne banking family of Jewish faith. He was born in 1856 to Hermann Abraham Levy (originally Löb) and Johanna Levy, née Coppel. Among his six siblings were among the brothers Albert Levy, a pioneer of social work in Germany and Louis Hagen, who after training as a banker in Cologne, worked at the A. Levy & Co. bank. His sister Emma later married the sculptor Hugo Rheinhold, and his sister Fanny married the lawyer Maximilian Kempner.

Carl changed the family name from Levy to Hagen in 1906. Hagen was the maiden name of the wife of his brother Louis, who had already changed his surname in 1893. Carl Hagen was married to Katharina Philippi (1864–1906). There were four children from this marriage. The screenwriter Hans Oliva-Hagen is one of his grandchildren, the singer Nina Hagen is a great-granddaughter, and the actress Cosma Shiva Hagen a great-great-granddaughter. From 1895, Carl and his family lived in the Villa Schwatlo, named after its builder Carl Schwatlo, at Kurfürstenstrasse 57 / Derfflingerstrasse 12 in the affluent Tiergarten district of Berlin. In addition, from 1906 he had the spacious Villa Carlshagen built as a summer residence in Potsdam on Templiner See.

Initially, Carl worked with his brother Louis in his father's bank in Cologne. He later headed the company's Berlin representative office. Later he founded his own banking house, Hagen & Co., in Berlin's Charlottenstrasse. The bank specialized in industrial finance and counted BMW among its customers, among others. Carl held numerous supervisory board mandates and was a member of the Jewish aid association Gesellschaft der Freunde (Society of Friends). He carried the title of Privy Councilor of Commerce and in 1898 received the Order of the Red Eagle, 4th class. From the founding year 1911 to 1936 he was a "supporting member" of the Kaiser Wilhelm Society. He was a member of the Kaiser Friedrich Museum Association and appeared repeatedly as a patron in events. In particular, he donated important works to the Berlin National Gallery. These included the paintings The House at Rueil (1882) by Édouard Manet and Children's Afternoon at Wargemont by Pierre-Auguste Renoir, both of which he financed in 1906. Together with the banker Karl Steinbart, he donated the painting The Church of Saint-Germain-l'Auxerrois by Claude Monet in 1906 and the painting 'c by the same artist in 1907.

His granddaughter Helga Hagen describes his attitude as follows: "My grandfather also tried to raise his children appropriately. They were all enormously patriotic and enormously nationalistic. My grandfather did everything to get medals and decorations from the emperor, and gave an enormous amount of money for the Kaiser Wilhelm Institute, gave wonderful pictures to museums."

== Nazi era ==
After 1933, the family faced persection by the German National Socialist government because of their Jewish heritage. Carl and Louis Hagen were expelled from advisory boards and the bank’s business shrank due to persecution. The Hagen family was forced to sell their shares in Bayerische Motorenwerke and other assets.

The bank was forced into liquidation by January 1, 1938 and Hagen died thirty days later, on January 30, 1938 at the age of 81.

His grave can be found in the Jewish cemetery on Schönhauser Allee in Berlin. The family was forced to sell the villa in Berlin-Tiergarten in 1938 to Berliner-Kindl-Schultheiss-Brauerei, which then made major changes to the building.

Carl's son Hermann Hagen was murdered in Sachsenhausen concentration camp in 1942. His grandson Hans was a Holocaust survivor who was imprisoned and tortured at Moabit prison.

== Reparations to heirs ==
During the Holocaust the Nazis confiscated properties belonging to Levy's descendants, including Villa Carlshagen and Birlinghoven Castle. In 2020, the Beratende Kommission recommended compensation to Levy's heirs due to the theft of a painting.

== Literature ==
- Günter Braun, Waldtraut Braun: Mäzenatentum in Berlin, Bürgersinn und kulturelle Kompetenz unter sich verändernden Bedingungen. De Gruyter, Berlin 1993, ISBN 3-11-013788-7.
- Cella-Margaretha Girardet: Jüdische Mäzene für die Preußischen Museen zu Berlin, eine Studie zum Mäzenatentum im Deutschen Kaiserreich und in der Weimarer Republik. Hänsel-Hohenhausen, Egelsbach 1997, ISBN 3-8267-1133-5.
- Johann Georg Prinz von Hohenzollern, Peter-Klaus Schuster (Hrsg.): Manet bis van Gogh, Hugo von Tschudi und der Kampf um die Moderne. Nationalgalerie Berlin und Neue Pinakothek München 1996, ISBN 3-7913-1748-2.
