= Carl Levy =

Carl Levy may refer to:

- Carl Edvard Marius Levy (1808–1865), professor and head of the Danish Maternity institution in Copenhagen
- Carl Levy (banker) (1856–1938), German banker
- Carl Levy (political scientist), professor of politics
