= Nhoah =

German music producer, composer and artist (born 1961)

- Born: 1961 (age 64–65); Berlin, Germany
- Genres: Electronic music; techno
- Occupations: Record producer; DJ; composer; artist
- Website: nhoah.com

Nhoah (born 1961; stylized as NHOAH) is a German music producer, composer, DJ and artist who lives and works in Berlin and Vienna.

== Early life and career ==
In 1980, Nhoah played the drums in various local bands in Berlin (i.a. Aeroflot, Komeda Artist) and worked alongside numerous international artists who resided in the city (e.g., Jayne County, Romy Haag, Hot Java).

Around this time electronic means of music production gained momentum and computationally derived sounds began to influence his work significantly. He continued to compose, produce and engineer musical content (e.g., for Larry Steinbacheck/Bronski Beat, Gareth Jones, Rio Reiser, Marianne Rosenberg) working mainly in Hansa Tonstudio and Tritonus Studio Berlin.

Several contract works followed (i.a. The Pogues, Peacock Palace, David Hasselhoff).

In 1998, he founded the record label and artist management company R.O.T respectortolerate to support and mentor the development of artistic talent from which multiple successful projects originated (e.g., MIA., The Aim of Design Is to Define Space, Schlindwein, Lulu Schmidt).

In 2011, the first album of his project Tangowerk by Nhoah was released. It mirrors musical influences from the notorious electro clubs of Berlin and tango orchestra from Buenos Aires. Many of the contributors are internationally recognised artists such as Adriana Varela, Louie Austen, Berlin Comedian Harmonists, Mieze Katz (from MIA.), Walter "Chino" Laborde, Ina Viola or Lulu Schmidt. The project also features elaborate visuals (video: Carola Schmidt), a complimentary movie and a stage play are in the making The album Tangowerk was nominated for the German Record Critics' Award Preis der deutschen Schallplattenkritik.

Nhoah received various gold and platinum awards for his productions. His work includes collaborations with the producers of The Eurythmics, Depeche Mode and Bronski Beat's Larry Steinbachek.

Since 2017, NHOAH has performed as a live-act and DJ. Since then, he released one studio album, several EP's and a live album with electronic music. Mainly in the genres Techno, Deep House and Electronica.

Spanning over decades, Nhoah's comprehensive body of work continues to garner the recognition of publications such as Resident Advisor, The Quietus, TRAX Mag, Clash Mag, PopMatters, Data Transmission, The Arts Desk, Be at TV, Electronic Groove and BBC 6 Music's Nemone.

== Productions ==
Nhoah's recent releases include his debut album West-Berlin (2018), featuring remixes from the likes of 808 State and μ-Ziq.

Following the Be at TV premiere of 'Stairway To Nothingness – Glacier Concert' (2019), a live video was recorded on a suspended glass stairway at 9000 feet, on the highest mountain of Styria, Austria: the Dachstein Glacier.

=== Albums (selected) ===
Year	Title	Contribution
2019	Piano & Electronic Ensemble Op. 1 (by Schlindwein)	producer/mixing engineer
2017	West-Berlin (by NHOAH)	producer/songwriter/mixing engineer
2018	Stairway to Nothingness – Glacier Concert (by NHOAH)	producer/songwriter/mixing engineer
2017	Electronic Piano (by Schlindwein)	producer/mixing engineer
2015	Berlin Sounds for the Next Decade (by various artists)	producer/songwriter/mixing engineer
2014	Excess All Areas (by Tangowerk)	producer/songwriter/mixing engineer
2012	Tacheles by (MIA.)	producer/mixer/songwriter
2011	Tangowerk (by Nhoah)	producer/mixer/songwriter
2008	Willkommen im Club (by MIA.)	producer/mixer/composer
2006	Zirkus (by MIA.)	producer/mixer/songwriter
2005	Good Time (by The Aim of Design Is to Define Space)	producer/mixer
2005	David vs. Goliath (by Flexevil)	producer/mixer
2004	Stille Post (by MIA.)	producer/mixer/songwriter
2003	Gosen U Can Rave 2 (by The Aim of Design Is to Define Space)	producer/mixer
2002	Hieb und Stichfest (by MIA.)	producer/mixer/composer
1996	Gift (by Peacock Palace)	artist/producer/composer
1993	Paraphernalia (by Peacock Palace)	artist/producer/composer
1991	Adding Wings (by Peacock Palace)	artist/producer/composer
1991	David (by David Hasselhoff)	arranger
1990	Crazy for You (by David Hasselhoff)	arranger/composer
1988	Komeda Artist (by Komeda Artist)	artist/producer/songwriter
1986	Flugblatt (by Romy Haag)	arranger/songwriter

=== Singles (selected) ===
Year	Title	Contribution
2020	Bristol Said: In the Name	producer/songwriter/mixing engineer
2019	Bloom (by Schlindwein)	producer/songwriter/mixing engineer
2019	Paris La Goutte D'Or (by NHOAH)	producer/songwriter/mixing engineer
2019	Sparks (by Schlindwein)	producer/songwriter/mixing engineer
2019	Between Vienna and the Stars	producer/songwriter/mixing engineer
2019	Welcome (by Schlindwein)	producer/songwriter/mixing engineer
2019	Sheep (by Ina Viola)	mixing engineer
2019	Après Minuit (by Schlindwein)	producer/songwriter/mixing engineer
2019	Nocturne III	producer/mixing engineer
2019	I Can't Satiyfy You (by NHOAH)	producer/songwriter/mixing engineer
2019	Fire (by Lulu Schmidt)	producer/co-songwriter/mixing engineer
2019	Mountain Calls (by NHOAH)	producer/songwriter/mixing engineer
2018	Der Goldene Ball (by NHOAH)	producer/songwriter/mixing engineer
2018	Call You Up (by Schlindwein)	producer/mixing engineer
2018	Abstellgleis (by NHOAH)	producer/songwriter/mixing engineer
2018	120 Red Skies (by NHOAH)	producer/songwriter/mixing engineer
2017	The Final Start by (Marc Prochnow)	producer/co-songwriter/mixing engineer
2016	Beautiful Day/Fucking Berlin (by Schlindwein feat. Lulu Schmidt)	producer/co-songwriter/mixing engineer
2015	Yoko Ono (by Baum & Hoena)	producer/co-songwriter/mixing engineer
2015	Sweet Petite (by Dr. Hirschfeld&Das Institut)	producer/songwriter/mixing engineer
2012	Fallschirm (by MIA.)	producer/arranger
2011	Tuyo Soy/Ob ich dir treu sein kann (by Tangowerk by Nhoah feat. Walter "Chino" Laborde/Berlin Comedian Harmonists/Karina Beorlegui)	artist/producer/songwriter
2011	Dancing on the Volcano (by Tangowerk by Nhoah feat. Headvoice)	artist/producer/songwriter
2008	Mein Freund (by MIA.)	producer/mixing engineer/co
2007	Zirkus (by MIA.)	producer/mixing engineer/composer
2006	Tanz der Moleküle (by MIA.)	producer/mixing engineer/composer
2005	Stadtschlagader (by Flexevil)	producer/mixing engineer
2005	Glamour Star/State Outta Babylon (by Mistah Bomsh)	producer
2004	Ökostrom (by MIA.)	producer/mixing engineer
2004	Sonne (by MIA.)	producer/mixing engineer
2004	Hungriges Herz (by MIA.)	producer/mixing engineer
2003	Was es ist (by MIA.)	producer/mixing engineer/composer
2002	Kreisel (by MIA.)	producer/mixing engineer
2002	Verrückt (by MIA.)	producer/mixing engineer/composer
2002	Alles neu (by MIA.)	producer/mixing engineer/composer
2002	Machtspiele (by MIA.)	producer/mixing engineer/composer
2001	Factory City (Electropunk Remix) (by MIA.)	producer/remix engineer
1996	First Time (by Peacock Palace feat. Andrew Richley (The Pogues))	artist/producer/composer
1996	Mellow Man (by Peacock Palace)	artist/producer/composer
1993	Heatwave (by Peacock Palace)	artist/producer/composer
1992	Looking for Freedom (Remix) (by David Hasselhoff)	remix engineer
1991	Henry's Song (by Peacock Palace)	artist/producer/composer
1991	Like a Snake (by Peacock Palace)	artist/producer/composer
1991	The Other Side of Town (by Sterling)	songwriter
1990	Keep the Jungle Alive (by Smash)	producer/songwriter
1990	New Life (by Scam Jam)	producer/songwriter
1988	Monkey Forest (by Komeda Artist)	artist/producer/songwriter
1988	Muscles (by Komeda Artist)	artist/producer/songwriter
1987	Heaven (by Komeda Artist feat. Larry Steinbacheck (Bronski Beat))	artist/producer/songwriter

=== Soundtracks (selected) ===
Year	Film	Contribution
2016	Beautiful Day (by Schlindwein feat. Lulu Schmdit)	song feature
2016	Innocent Dubstepmix (by NHOAH/Tangowerk)	song feature
2008	Bassonia (documentary)	song feature
2008	Spielverderber (film)	song feature
2007	Wir bitten dich, verführe uns! (short film by Carola Schmidt)	film music
2003	2 Ryk Og En Afelevering (film)	song feature
2003	Führer Ex (film)	movie theme
1998	Cobra 11 (TV series)	remixed movie theme
1996	Wolkenstein (TV series)	movie theme

== Other works ==
Together with Carola Schmidt, he received the short film newcomer award of the Diagonale (Filmfestival) 2008 in Austria, for the short film: "Wir bitten dich, verführe uns!".

Under the pseudonym H.Flug, he applies himself as a photographer, painter and writer, exhibiting his works in renowned galleries and exhibitions and frequently collaborating with visual and performance artists (i.a. Eric Tannhäuser, Carola Schmidt).
