= Don't Forget My Little Traudel =

1957 film

- Directed by: Kurt Maetzig
- Written by: Kurt Barthel
- Produced by: Hans-Joachim Schoeppe
- Starring: Eva-Maria Hagen
- Cinematography: Erwin Anders
- Edited by: Ilse Peters
- Music by: Hans Hendrik Wehding
- Distributed by: Progress Film
- Release date: 15 November 1957
- Running time: 86 minutes
- Country: East Germany
- Language: German

Don't Forget My Little Traudel (German: Vergeßt mir meine Traudel nicht) is an East German comedy film, directed by Kurt Maetzig. It was released in 1957.

== Plot ==
Traudel is a war orphan, whose mother died in the Ravensbrück concentration camp after refusing to renounce her love for a Czechoslovak prisoner. The only memento of her mother is a letter ending with the words "don't forget my little Traudel". When she turns seventeen, she flees the orphanage and ventures to Berlin, where she meets policeman Hannes, who falls in love with her and even forges documents for her. He is caught, but is only slightly reprimanded, and marries her.

== Cast ==
- Eva-Maria Hagen: Traudel Gerber
- Horst Kube: Hannes Wunderlich
- Günther Haack: Wolfgang Auer
- Erna Sellmer: Mrs. Palotta
- Günther Simon: Police officer
- Fred Delmare: Traudel's roommate
- Paul R. Henker: man in the shop
- Sabine Thalbach: cashier
- Nico Turoff: night watchman

== Production ==
In the late 1950s, the East German cultural authorities allowed a certain liberalization in the national cinema industry, and a series of entertainment-oriented films was produced by DEFA as a result, mainly comedies. Director Kurt Maetzig told an interviewer that he decided to create a light-hearted comedy after being exhausted by the work on "the all-too-serious" Castles and Cottages. He encountered difficulties when he tried to have the script approved for filming by the DEFA Commission, which criticized it for lack of morality and overly-sexual content; only the influence of the director and of writer Kurt Barthel enabled it to be authorized. Maetzig was influenced by The Seven Year Itch when making Don't Forget My Little Traudel, and included a scene in which Eva-Maria Hagen's skirt fluttered in the wind in a manner reminiscent of Marilyn Monroe's famous appearance. The movie was the actress's debut on screen.

== Reception ==
Although Traudel was a commercial success, Maetzig complained that most critics did not respond well to the film: Mikhail Romm told that the director "betrayed Socialist Realism" after watching it. The East German authorities continued to see it in negative light after its release.

Antonin and Miera Liehm called the film "a tale of cheap sentimentality". Joshua Feinstein wrote that "the director was certainly not above... depicting women in demeaning conventions... as a voluptuous ditz". Sabine Hake noted that the film, while presenting the adventures of a teenage girl, still used the conventions of class struggle and other communist motifs when depicting society.
