= Kołczyn, Lubusz Voivodeship =

Kołczyn
- Village
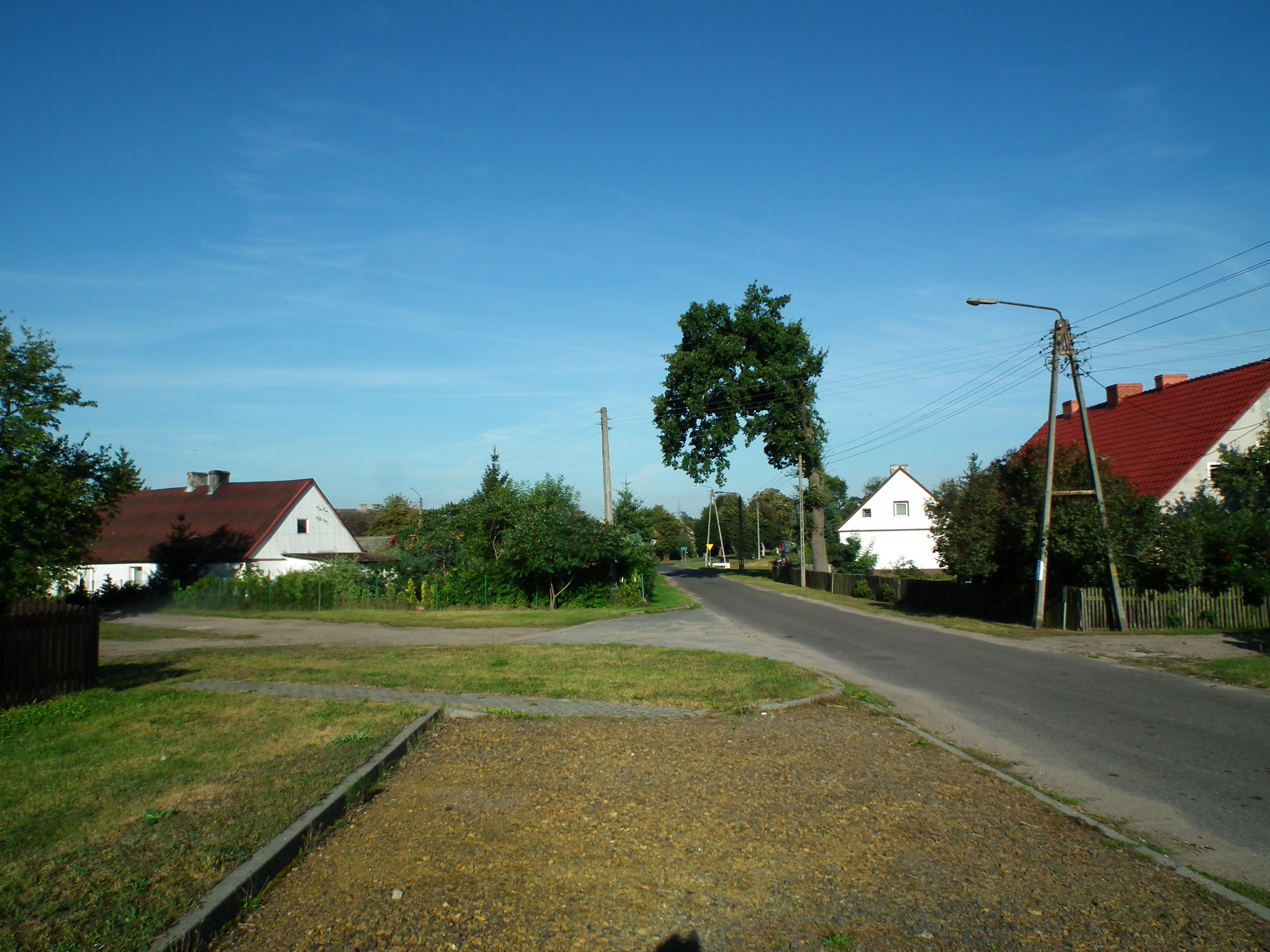

- Location within Poland
- Coordinates: 52°36′43″N 15°7′10″E
- Country: Poland
- Voivodeship: Lubusz
- County: Sulęcin
- Gmina: Krzeszyce
- Population: 400

Kołczyn [ˈkɔu̯t͡ʂɨn] is a village in the administrative district of Gmina Krzeszyce, within Sulęcin County, Lubusz Voivodeship, in western Poland.

== Notable residents ==
- Eva-Maria Hagen (1934–2022), German actress
