= Irgendwo auf der Welt (album) =

Studio album by Nina Hagen
- Released: March 24, 2006
- Genre: Big band
- Label: Umvd Import
- Producer: Nina Hagen

Nina Hagen chronology
| Big Band Explosion (feat. Leipzig Big Band) (2003) | Irgendwo auf der Welt (2006) | Personal Jesus (2010) |

Irgendwo auf der Welt is the eleventh solo (and thirteenth overall) studio album by Nina Hagen and the Capital Dance Orchestra, released on March 24, 2006. The album contains various covers of jazz, rock and pop classics.

== Track listing ==
1. "Irgendwo auf der Welt"
2. "Deep in a Dream" (Eddie DeLange, Jimmy Van Heusen)
3. "Serenade in Blue" (Mack Gordon, Harry Warren)
4. "Flat Foot Floogie" (Slim Gaillard, Leroy "Slam" Stewart, Bud Green)
5. "Yes, Sir"
6. "An einem Tag im Frühling"
7. "Halli, Hallo"
8. "Summertime" (George Gershwin, DuBose Heyward)
9. "Somewhere Over the Rainbow" (Harold Arlen, E.Y. Harburg)
10. "But Not for Me" (George Gershwin, Ira Gershwin)
11. "And the Angels Sing"
12. "Der Wind hat mir ein Lied erzählt"
13. "Roter Mohn"
14. "Day In - Day Out"
15. "Means That You're Grand (Bei mir bist du scheen)"
16. "Happiness"
17. "Für mich soll's rote Rosen regnen" (Hildegard Knef)
