= Sabine Thalbach =

German actress

- Born: 4 August 1932; Berlin, Germany
- Died: 30 September 1966 (aged 34); East Berlin, East Germany
- Occupation: Actress
- Years active: 1951–1967 (film)

Sabine Thalbach (actually Sabine Joachim genannt Thalbach; 4 August 1932 – 30 September 1966) was a German actress who appeared in many East German films. She was married to the director Benno Besson, and was the mother of the actress Katharina Thalbach.

== Selected filmography ==
- The Kaiser's Lackey (1951)
- Don't Forget My Little Traudel (1957)
- Der kleine Kuno (1959)
