= Eva-Maria Hagen =

German actress and singer (1934–2022)

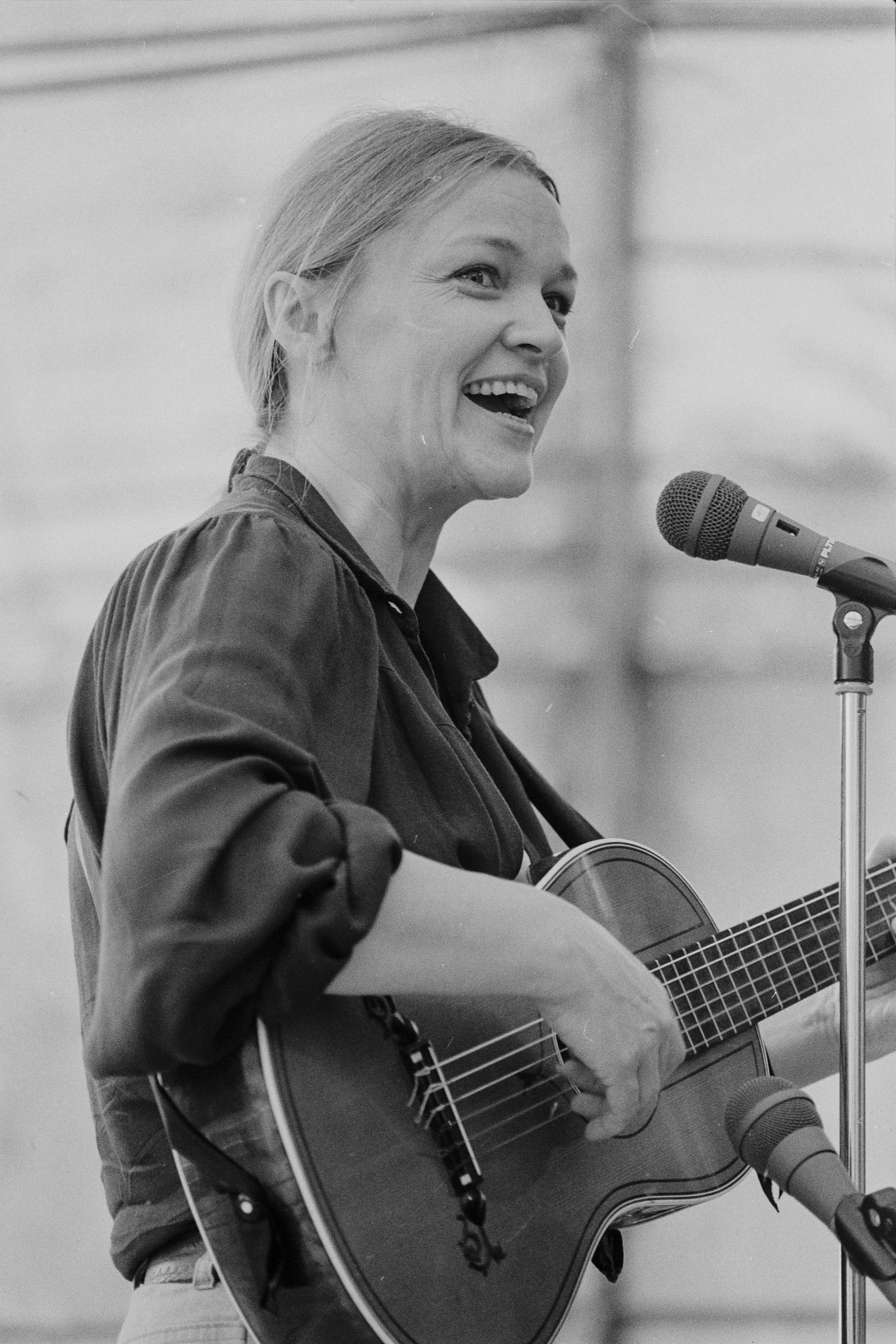
- Hagen in 1981
- Born: Eva-Maria Buchholz; 19 October 1934; Költschen, Brandenburg, Prussia, Germany (modern day Kołczyn, Lubusz Voivodeship, Poland)
- Died: 16 August 2022 (aged 87); Hamburg, Germany
- Occupations: Actress and singer
- Years active: 1957–2022
- Spouse: Hans Oliva-Hagen (m. 1954; div. 1959)
- Partners: Wolf Biermann; Matti Geschonneck; Siegfried Gerlich
- Children: Nina Hagen
- Relatives: Cosma Shiva Hagen (granddaughter)

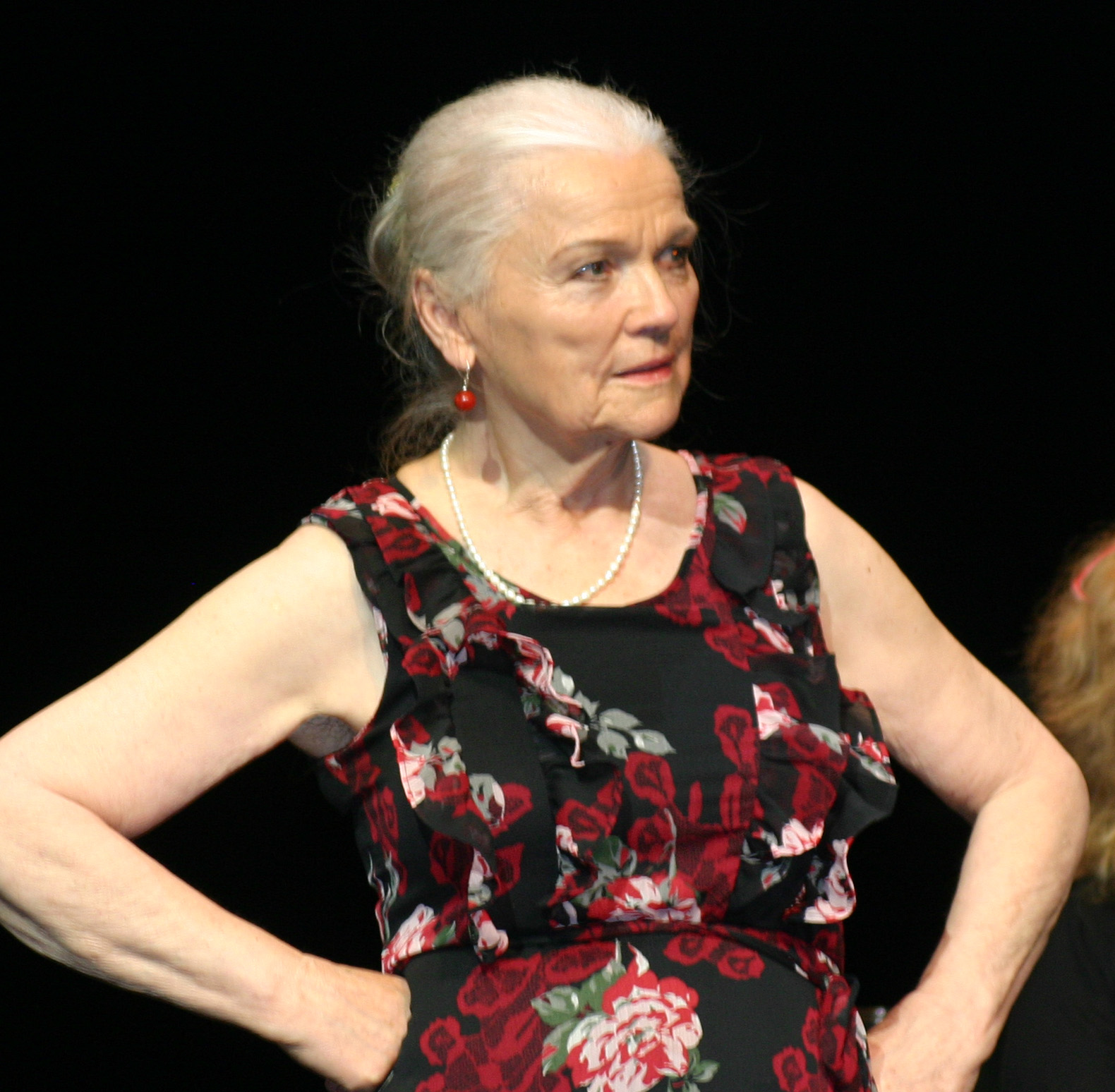
Hagen in 2013

Eva-Maria Hagen (née Buchholz; German: [ˈeː.fa ma.ˈʁiː.a ˈhaːgŋ̩]; 19 October 1934 – 16 August 2022) was a German actress and singer. She was known as the "Brigitte Bardot of the GDR" but was banned from performance for political reasons.

== Early life and career ==
Hagen was born Eva-Maria Buchholz in Költschen (present-day Poland) on 19 October 1934, the daughter of farm workers from East Brandenburg. In 1945, Költschen was occupied by the Soviet army and the family was expelled. They moved to Perleberg, which became part of the GDR in 1949.

In 1952, after completing an apprenticeship as a machinist, she was trained at the Ernst Busch Academy of Dramatic Arts in Berlin. She joined the Berliner Ensemble in 1953. Hagen made her theater debut in 1953 in Erwin Strittmatter's play Katzgraben directed by Bertolt Brecht at the Berliner Ensemble.

In 1957, she made her film debut in Kurt Maetzig's comedy Don't Forget My Little Traudel. Her film career led to her being called the "Brigitte Bardot of the GDR". From 1958, she acted at the Maxim Gorki Theater in Berlin. At the Landestheater Dessau, she had continued success as the flower girl Eliza in the musical My Fair Lady.

In 1965, she met Wolf Biermann. Despite becoming a successful film actress she was sidelined because of her relationship with Biermann. He was a singer-songwriter whose politics kept him unemployed. In 1972, Biermann and Hagen separated. In 1976, she publicly protested against Biermann's expatriation. She was dismissed without notice from the German television broadcaster Deutscher Fernsehfunk (DFF) in the GDR and banned from working. In 1977, Hagen's citizenship in the GDR was revoked, and she moved to West Germany the same year.

She built up a second career as a chanson singer in addition to film and theater. After the fall of the Berlin Wall, Hagen made films in Babelsberg again, appeared on stage as Medea or Mother Courage or sang Brecht songs. She painted in oil and went on reading tours with her own books.

== Personal life ==
In 1954 she married Hans Oliva-Hagen and they had a child named Catharina, singer and actress Nina Hagen. She divorced him in 1959 over psychological issues.

Hagen lived in Hamburg, Berlin and the Uckermark. She is the grandmother of Cosma Shiva Hagen.

Hagen died on 16 August 2022 in Hamburg, at the age of 87.

== Awards ==
- 1999 Carl Zuckmayer Medal for her autobiographical book Eva and the Wolf

== Selected filmography ==
Sources:

- Don't Forget My Little Traudel (1957), as Traudel
- Spur in die Nacht (1957), as Sabine
- Goods for Catalonia (1959), as Marion Stöckel
- The Dress (1961), as Katrin
- Reise ins Ehebett (1966), as Mary Lou
- Meine Freundin Sybille (1967), as Helena
- The Banner of Krivoi Rog (1967), as Elfriede
- The Legend of Paul and Paula (1973) as clubgoer
- Zum Beispiel Josef (Film) (1974) as Ema
- Johannes Kepler (film) (1974) as Reinboldin
- Liebesfallen (1976) as Frau Reitstock
- Nelken in Aspik (1976) as Helene
- Gibbi Westgermany (1980), as Gibbi's Mother
- Herzlich willkommen (1990), as Secretary
- Schroeder's Wonderful World (2006), as Henriette Wolf
- Dinosaurier – Gegen uns seht ihr alt aus! (2009), as Lena Braake

=== Television ===
Except if noted, all are in TV-movies and are in DFF/DEFA productions:

- Das grüne Ungeheuer (1962) as Joan in the mini-series
- Wolf Among Wolves (TV series) (1965) as Sophie Kowalewski in the mini-series
- Polizeiruf 110 (DFF, 1972-1973) occasional appearances in detective series
- Heiraten/weiblich (1975) as Gisela Pohl in the TV-movie

== Books ==
- Hagen, Eva-Maria (2006) [1999]. Eva und der Wolf (in German). Berlin. ISBN 978-3-548-60687-3. OCLC 180925349.
- Evas schöne neue Welt (in German). Munich: Econ. 2000. ISBN 3-430-13756-X. OCLC 51859300.
- Eva jenseits vom Paradies (in German). Berlin: Ullstein. 2005. ISBN 3-550-07835-8. OCLC 58602556.
