= Punk Wedding =

Single by Nina Hagen
- Released: 1987 (Germany); 1988 (Canada)
- Recorded: 1986
- Studio: Hansa Tonstudio (Berlin)
- Genre: Punk rock
- Label: Metropol; Amok
- Producer: Nina Hagen

Nina Hagen singles chronology
| "Don't Kill the Animals" (1986) | "Punk Wedding" (1987) | "Hold Me" (1989) |

"Punk Wedding" is a song by German singer Nina Hagen. It was released as a standalone single. The German version "Punkhochzeit" was first released in 1987 by Metropol Records and the English version was released in 1988 by Amok Records. The song celebrates Hagen's marriage to an 18-year-old South African punk named Iroquois. It is also her first independent release since the expiration of her recording deal with Columbia Records. The German version of the single was labeled "Banned from East Berlin".

== Background ==
After her recording contract with Columbia Records expired in 1986, Hagen kept on performing and releasing music independently. In 1987, she caught the attention of the media by announcing her marriage to an 17-year-old South African punk named Iroquois, whom she met in Rome in 1985. The song "Punk Wedding" was written for the wedding and Hagen described the event as a marriage between the punk and new age movements. The wedding was scheduled on August 9, 1987. When asked about having any apprehensions about marrying someone barely half her age, Hagen replied:

It doesn't matter how old people are. It matters if they love each other and have fun with each other. It has nothing to do with age. To get old is a mental disease. Everything is in the head.

In 1995, when Hagen married Gordon Polk, the lead singer of the punk rock band FiFi, she claimed it was her first wedding and the previous wedding with Iroquois was "just for fun" and not real.

== Track listing ==
| No. | Title | Writer(s) | Length |
|---|---|---|---|
| 1. | "Can You Take a Joke (Or Do You Wanna Have Some)" | Jens Kuphal; Jürgen Dehmel; Billy Liesegang; Peter Krause; Nina Hagen | 3:51 |
| 2. | "Punkhochzeit" | Kuphal; Dehmel; Liesegang; Krause; Hagen | 3:41 |
| 3. | "Hardcore Rebell-Hochzeitsparty" (feat. Ramonez 77) | Martin Witte; Thomas Zabel; Pforr; Burmester; Hagen | 2:54 |
| 4. | "Punkwedding" (English version) | Kuphal; Dehmel; Liesegang; Krause; Hagen | 3:41 |
| Total length: | | | 14:07 |

== Personnel ==
- Nina Hagen – vocals
- Jens Kuphal – keyboards
- Jürgen Dehmel – bass
- Billy Liesegang – guitar
- Peter Krause – drums
