= Return of the Mother =

Studio album by Nina Hagen
- Released: February 14, 2000
- Recorded: 1996–1999
- Genre: Industrial rock; electronica
- Length: 45:06
- Label: BIEM
- Producer: Nina Hagen, Ingo Krauss, Reinhold Heil

Nina Hagen chronology
Om Namah Shivay (1999)	Return of the Mother (2000)	Big Band Explosion (2003)

Singles from Return of the Mother
- 1. "Der Wind hat mir ein Lied erzählt" Released: 2000

Professional ratings
Review scores
Source	Rating
Allmusic	3/5 stars

Return of the Mother is the ninth solo (and eleventh overall) studio album by Nina Hagen, released on February 14, 2000.

== Track listing ==
No.	Title	Writer(s)	Length
1.	"Return of the Mother"	Nina Hagen	4:36
2.	"Der Wind hat mir ein Lied erzählt"	Lothar Brühne; Bruno Balz	3:50
3.	"Schachmatt"	Hagen	5:06
4.	"Frequenzkontrolle"	Hagen; Keith Forsey	4:55
5.	"Poetenclub"	Hagen; Zeus B. Held	5:02
6.	"Höllenzug"	Hagen	3:21
7.	"Schüttel mich"	Hagen; Reinhold Heil	3:52
8.	"Yes Sir"	Ralph Benatzky	4:05
9.	"Handgrenade"	Hagen	4:32
10.	"He Shiva Shankara"	Hagen	5:47
Total length:			45:06

Notes

- "Poetenclub" is a homage to the Austrian popstar Falco who died two years before. In the song Nina Hagen sings over samples from interviews with Falco, thus creating a post-mortem duet.
- "Der Wind hat mir ein Lied erzählt" and "Yes Sir" were previously sung by Zarah Leander. Nina Hagen also covered Zarah Leander's "Ich weiß es wird einmal ein Wunder geschehen" on the album Angstlos.
- "Return of the Mother" is sung in English, "He Shiva Shankara" in Sanskrit, "Handgrenade" is an English version (with a different backing track) of "Höllenzug".
