= Staab =

Staab is a German surname that may refer to:

- Heinz Staab (1926–2012), German chemist
- Henry A. Staab (1875–?), American politician
- Monika Staab (born 1959), German football player and manager
- Rebecca Staab (born 1961), American actress
- Roy Staab (born 1941), American artist
- Sam Staab (born 1997), American soccer player
