= Personal Jesus (album) =

Studio album by Nina Hagen
- Released: July 16, 2010
- Genres: Gospel; rock; soul; Christian rock; blues
- Length: 43:04
- Label: Koch
- Producer: Paul Roessler

Nina Hagen chronology
Irgendwo auf der Welt (2006)	Personal Jesus (2010)	Volksbeat (2011)

Personal Jesus is the twelfth solo (and fourteenth overall) studio album by the German singer Nina Hagen. It was released on July 16, 2010, in Germany and on July 27, 2010, in the US.

== Background ==
In 2009, Hagen had herself baptized as an evangelical in Schüttorf at the age of 54. The event would be echoed in the singer's twelfth solo album Personal Jesus, centered on Christianity.

The album has been described as "a blend of rock, blues, soul and gospel." It is a collection of covers of classics and traditionals, as well as lesser known songs. Hagen was inspired to make an entire album of gospel after the discovery of the gospel formation Dixie Hummingbirds.

Album production was helmed by long-time collaborator Paul Roessler, as Hagen desired to record the album "as traditionally as possible": "sure, you could do a lot with remixes, but I wanted to keep it simple and real," she explained.

The album was recorded in Los Angeles and was self-financed, as Hagen explains "I had no idea if any company would be interested in it." The deal with Koch Universal happened only later on, through Hagen's manager Alex Grob, who knew Jorg Hellwig, the new head of the label.

== Release and promotion ==
On June 15, 2010, the album was announced with a release date on July 16. On June 26, the album was put up for pre-listening exclusively on SoundCloud.

The cover of "Personal Jesus" by Depeche Mode was released as lead single. On December 14, Hagen performed on the French TV show Taratata to promote the album.

== Track listing ==
No.	Title	Writer(s)	Length
1.	"God's Radar" (Cover of The Dixie Hummingbirds)	Reverend Dan Smith	3:58
2.	"I'll Live Again" (Cover of Angelic Gospel Singers)	Margaret Allison	2:48
3.	"Personal Jesus" (Cover of Depeche Mode)	Martin Gore	4:01
4.	"Nobody's Fault but Mine" (Cover of Blind Willie Johnson)	Blind Willie Johnson	4:01
5.	"Down at the Cross"	Berry E Graul, Blair Masters, Brown Bannister, Dan Needham, Donohue Chris, Elisha Hoffman, Jerome A. Mc Pherson	3:13
6.	"Just a Little Talk with Jesus" (Cover of Elvis Presley)	Cleavant Derricks	3:49
7.	"Mean Old World" (Cover of T-Bone Walker)	Traditional	3:03
8.	"Help Me" (Cover of Larry Gatlin and the Gatlin Brothers)	Larry Gatlin	2:35
9.	"Take Jesus with You" (Cover of Angelic Gospel Singers)	Allison	3:12
10.	"On the Battlefield"	Traditional	3:41
11.	"Run On"	Traditional	2:27
12.	"All You Fascists Bound to Lose" (Cover of Woody Guthrie)	Woody Guthrie	1:40
13.	"Sometimes I Ring Up Heaven"	Anthony Heilbut	4:12
Total length:			42:47
