= Revolution Ballroom =

Studio album by Nina Hagen
- Released: September 28, 1993
- Recorded: 1992–1993
- Genre: Pop rock; dance; electronica; blues
- Length: 51:26
- Label: Mercury
- Producer: Phil Manzanera

Nina Hagen chronology
Street (1991)	Revolution Ballroom (1993)	freuD euch / BeeHappy (1995/96)

Singles from Revolution Ballroom
- 1. "So Bad" Released: 1994; 2. "Pillow Talk" Released: 1994

Revolution Ballroom is the sixth solo (and eighth overall) studio album by German singer-songwriter and actress Nina Hagen, released on September 28, 1993 by Mercury Records. It features the singles "So Bad" and "Pillow Talk". The music video for "So Bad" was directed by Marcus Nispel and filmed in Broadway Stages in Astoria, New York.

== Track listing ==
No.	Title	Writer(s)	Length
1.	"So Bad"	Nina Hagen; Olle Romo; Dave Stewart	4:59
2.	"Revolution Ballroom"	Hagen	3:55
3.	"Right on Time"	Traditional	3:33
4.	"Pollution Pirates"	Hagen; Emam	4:15
5.	"King of Hearts"	Hagen; Bernhard Potschka	4:36
6.	"L'Amore"	Hagen	5:38
7.	"Pillow Talk"	Hagen; MC Ricky D; Pam Hoog	5:07
8.	"Berlin"	Hagen	5:10
9.	"I'm Going to Live the Life"	Traditional	3:48
10.	"Gypsy Love"	Hagen; Dave Stewart	5:07
11.	"Omhaidakhandi"	Hagen; Traditional	5:26
Total length:			51:26

Bonus Tracks
No.	Title	Writer(s)	Length
12.	"Wedding Suite: Pilly Wedding"	Jens Kuphal; Jürgen Dehmel; Billy Liesegang; Peter Krause; Hagen	3:50
13.	"Wedding Suite: Hardcore Wedding"	Martin Witte; Thomas Zabel; Pforr Burmester; Hagen	2:47
14.	"Go Ahead (Dance version)"	Hagen; Zeus B. Held	4:25
15.	"So Bad (Utah Saints Edit)"	Hagen; Olle Romo; Dave Stewart	4:28
Total length:			1:06:56

Note

- "L'amore" is sung in Italian, "Berlin" is sung in German, French and English, "Omhaidakhandi" is sung in Sanskrit.

== Personnel ==
- Nina Hagen – vocals
- Phil Manzanera – guitar, drum programming
- Livingstone Brown – bass
- Andy Mackay – saxophone
- Olle Romo – keyboards, drum programming
- David A. Stewart – keyboards, background vocals, drum programming
- Keith Bessey – drum programming
- Clive Mayuyu – drums
- Porl Young – drum programming
- Nigel Butler – bass, keyboards, drum programming
- Pam Hoog – voices
- Matteo Saggese – keyboards
- Archbishop Desmond Tutu – voice sample
- Billy Liesegang – guitar, harmonica
- Bernhard Potschka – guitar
- Nelson Mandela – voice sample
- Durga McBroom – backing vocals
- Sacha Collisson – wah wah guitar
