= Big Band Explosion =

Studio album by Nina Hagen
- Released: November 17, 2003
- Studios: Transport Music Studio, Leipzig, Germany
- Genres: Jazz, big band
- Label: SPV Recordings
- Producer: Nina Hagen

Nina Hagen chronology
Return of the Mother (2000)	Big Band Explosion (2003)	Irgendwo auf der Welt (2006)

Big Band Explosion is the tenth solo (and twelfth overall) album by Nina Hagen, released on November 17, 2003, featuring the Leipzig Big Band.

== Critical reception ==
The Allmusic review by David Jeffries awarded the album 3 stars stating "The lady was born to entertain, and if you're warm to her in-your-face absurdity, Big Band Explosion is a heck of a lot of fun. You'll be on the edge of your seat as the singer delivers the tunes straight-faced, but you just know that any moment she's going to bust out the brash Nina of old.".

Professional ratings
Review scores
Source	Rating
Allmusic	3/5 stars

== Track listing ==
1. "Let Me Entertain You" (Jules Styne, Stephen Sondheim) - 2:47
2. "Sugar Blues" (Clarence Williams, Lucy Fletcher) - 3:26
3. "I Want to Be Happy" (Irving Caesar, Vincent Youmans) - 2:35
4. "The Lady Loves Me" (Roy C. Bennett, Sid Tepper) - 4:14 duet with Lucas Alexander
5. "Rhythm & Romance" (George Whiting, J.C. Johnson, Nat Schwartz) - 3:06
6. "Rainbow" (E.Y. Harburg, Harold Arlen) - 4:28
7. "If You Ever Should Leave" (Sammy Cohen, Saul Chaplin) - 2:38
8. "Fever" (Eddy Cooley, John Davenport) - 4:52
9. "Love & Kisses" (Paul Francis Webster, Rudolf Friml) - 3:11
10. "All Over Nothing @ All" (Arthur Altman, Jack Lawrence) - 3:34
11. "Let's Call the Whole Thing Off" (George Gershwin, Ira Gershwin) 3:28 duet with Lucas Alexander
12. "Starlit Hour" (Mitchell Parish, Peter De Rose) - 4:17

== Personnel ==
Musicians

- Nina Hagen – vocals, concept, cover photo, creative consultant
- Frank Nowicky – alto saxophone, bandleader
- Michael Arnold – tenor saxophone
- Andrea Bauer – baritone saxophone
- Wolfram Dix – percussion
- Torsten Hell – trumpet
- Matthias Büttner – trombone
- Hans-Peter Fechner – bass trombone
- Jack Roth – drums
- Ralf Schrabbe – keyboards, piano

Production

- Michael Schöbel – concept, creative consultant
- Jim Steinfeldt – photography
- Ansgar Striepens – arranger
- Peter Herbolzheimer – arranger
- Andy Jackson – mastering
- Michael Wolff – mixing, producer, vocal engineer
