= Nina Hagen (album) =

Studio album by Nina Hagen
- Released: August 23, 1989
- Recorded: December 1988 – February 1989
- Studio: Voice Versa Studios; Eastcote Studios; Sarm West Studios, London
- Genre: Hard rock; Dance-pop
- Length: 64:52
- Label: Mercury
- Producer: Zeus B. Held

Nina Hagen chronology
In Ekstasy / In Ekstase (1985)	Nina Hagen (1989)	Street (1991)

Singles from Nina Hagen
- 1. "Hold Me" Released: 1989; 2. "Michail, Michail (Gorbachev Rap) / Hold Me" Released: 1989; 3. "Las Vegas" Released: 1989; 4. "Ave Maria" Released: 1989; 5. "Love Heart Attack" Released: 1990

Professional ratings
Review scores
Source	Rating
Allmusic	2/5 stars
Hi-Fi News & Record Review	A:1

Nina Hagen is the fourth solo (and sixth overall) studio album by German singer Nina Hagen. It was released on August 23, 1989, by Mercury Records.

== Track listing ==
No.	Title	Writer(s)	Length
1.	"Move Over"	Janis Joplin	4:36
2.	"Super Freak Family"	Hagen; Billy Liesegang	4:18
3.	"Love Heart Attack"	Junger Junior; Dawson Miller	4:09
4.	"Hold Me"	Mahalia Jackson (cover); Billy Liesegang	4:08
5.	"Las Vegas"	Doc Pomus; Mort Shuman	2:52
6.	"Live on Mars"	Hagen; Zeus B. Held	5:02
7.	"Dope Sucks"	Herman Brood	3:06
8.	"Only Seventeen"	Billy Liesegang; Dawson Miller; Zeus B. Held; Hagen	5:10
9.	"Where's the Party"	Hagen; Billy Liesegang	3:48
10.	"Michail, Michail (Gorbachev Rap)"	Wolf Biermann	5:07
11.	"Ave Maria"	Franz Schubert; Arranged by Hagen, Zeus B. Held	5:26
Total length:			47:15

Notes

- "Live on Mars" is sung in Sanskrit.
- "Michail Michail" and "Ave Maria" are sung in German.

== Personnel ==
- Nina Hagen – vocals
- Billy Liesegang – guitar; bass on "Dope Sucks"
- Luís Jardim – drums, percussion; bass on "Love Heart Attack"
- Zeus B. Held – keyboards
- The Soultanas – background vocals
- Lene Lovich – vocals on "Where's the Party"
- Lemmy – vocals, distorted bass on "Where's the Party"
- Kick Horns – brass on "Only Seventeen"
- Mark Griffiths – bass, guitar on "Hold Me" and "Ave Maria"
- Barry Fitzgerald – drums on "Super Freak Family" and "Dope Sucks"
- Lawrence Cottle – bass on "Only Seventeen"
- Alistair Gavin – piano on "Ave Maria"
- Martin Ditcham – percussion on "Ave Maria"
- The Bortobello Philharmonic, conducted by Richard Niles on "Ave Maria"
- Jean-Paul Gaultier – art direction
