= BeeHappy =

Studio album by Nina Hagen
- Released: April 1996
- Recorded: 1995–1996
- Genre: Alternative Rock
- Length: 41:27
- Producers: Nina Hagen, Toubab, Julian Joseph, Ralf Goldkind

Nina Hagen chronology
freuD euch (1995)	BeeHappy (1996)	Om Namah Shivay (1999)

BeeHappy is the seventh solo (and ninth overall) studio album by Nina Hagen, released in April 1996. It is the English version of the previous album, FreuD euch.

== Track listing ==
All tracks composed by Nina Hagen; except where indicated:

1. "Runaway" (Abgehaun) (Dee Dee Ramone) – 3:51
2. "Giant Step" (Riesenschritt) (Carole King, Gerry Goffin) – 3:04
3. "Born to Die in Berlin" (Dee Dee Ramone, Hagen) – 3:14
4. "Sunday Morning" (Sonntagmorgen) (Lou Reed, John Cale) – 3:27
5. "Shiva" (H. Da Khandi Samag, Hagen) – 4:15
6. "Barbed Wire" (Stacheldraht) – 3:25
7. "Ska Thing" (Wende) – 1:58
8. "The Art" (Kunst) – 2:56
9. "Zero Zero U.F.O." (English version) (Dee Dee Ramone, Daniel Rey) – 2:34
10. "Freedom Fighter" (Freiheitslied) – 3:19
11. "I Am Nina" (Junkie) (Einfach Nina) – 1:20
12. "Star Girl" (Sternmädchen) (Dee Dee Ramone, Ralf Goldkind, Hagen) – 2:49
13. "Leave Me Alone" (Lass mich in Ruhe) (Dee Dee Ramone, Hagen) – 1:48
14. "Tiere" (same version as on "FreuD euch") (Ralph Goldkind) – 3:27

Notes

- (The German title here indicates the name of the song on "FreuD euch", even if the song is a cover of an English song, for example The Velvet Underground's song "Sunday Morning")
- The English versions use the original German backing tracks, except for "Barbed Wire" which is a new version based on "Stacheldraht".
- "Gloria Halleluja Amen", "Geburt", "Elefantengott Jai Ganesh" and "Pank" were omitted; "Born to Die in Berlin" and "Shiva" are new songs.

== Personnel ==
- Nina Hagen – vocals
- Julian Joseph – keyboards
- Dee Dee Ramone – rhythm guitar
- Fabrizio Grossi – bass
- Ralf Goldkind – lead and rhythm guitar, bass, keyboards, programming
- J.P. Cervonie – rhythm and lead guitar
- David Nash – programming
- Andy Birr – drums
- Corky James – guitar
- Ash Wednesday – bass, programming
