= Nina Hagen =

German singer, songwriter, and actress (born 1955)

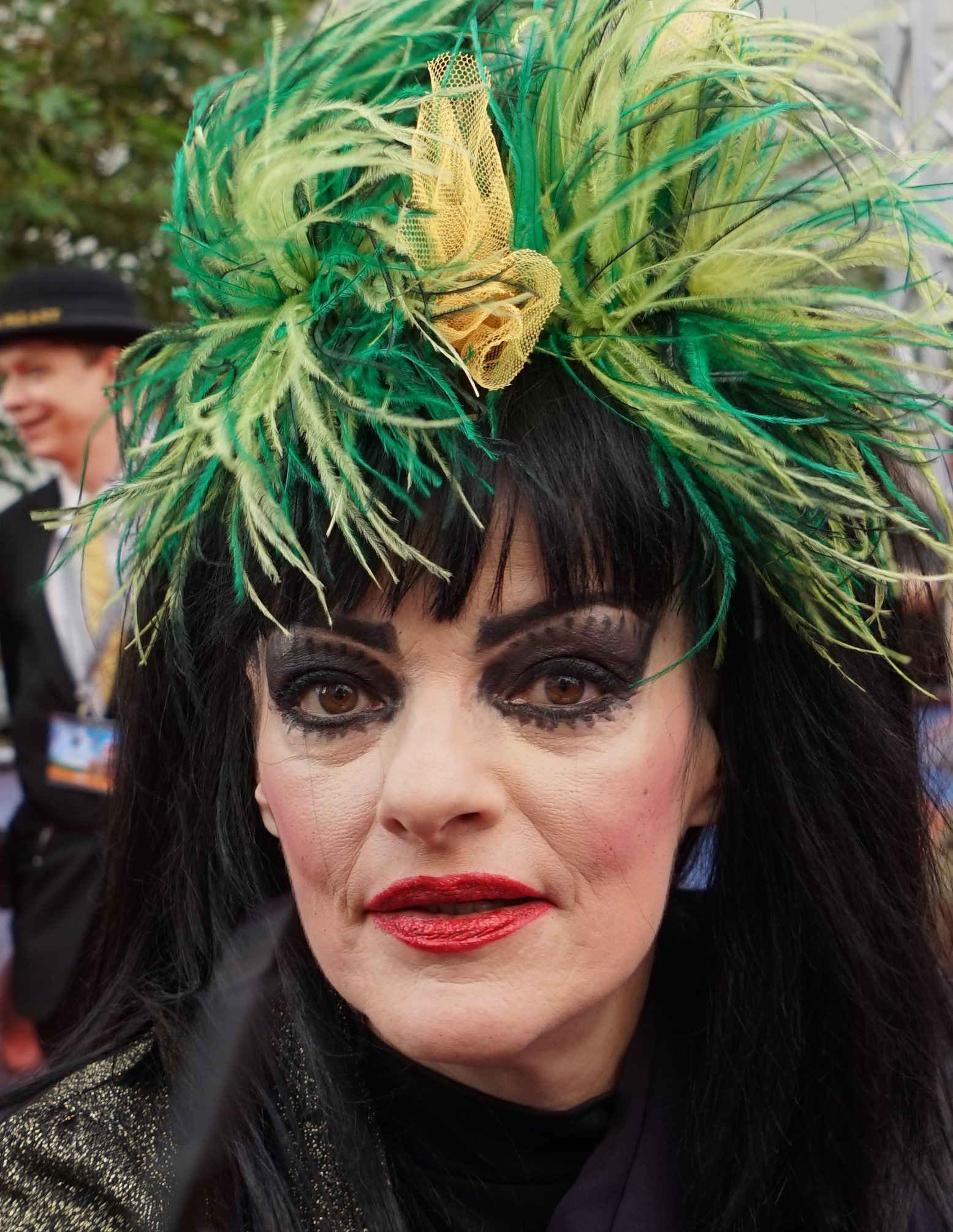
- Hagen at the premiere of The Seventh Dwarf, September 2014
- Born: Catharina Hagen; 11 March 1955 (age 71); East Berlin, East Germany
- Occupations: Singer; songwriter; actress
- Years active: 1971–present
- Spouses: David Lynn (m. 1996–2000) Lucas Alexander (m. 2004–2005)
- Partners: Ferdi Karmelk (1979–1981); Franck Chevalier (1989)
- Children: 2, including Cosma Shiva Hagen
- Parents: Hans Oliva-Hagen; Eva-Maria Hagen; Wolf Biermann (stepfather)
- Musical career
- Genres: Punk rock; Neue Deutsche Welle; new wave; post-punk
- Labels: CBS; Mercury; Ariola; Koch
- Website: ninahagendas.beepworld.de

Catharina "Nina" Hagen (German: [ˈniːna ˈhaːɡn̩]; born 11 March 1955) is a German singer, songwriter, and actress. She is known for her theatrical vocals and rise to prominence during the punk and Neue Deutsche Welle movements in the late 1970s and early 1980s. She is known as "The Godmother of German Punk".

Born and raised in the former East Berlin, German Democratic Republic, Hagen began her career as an actress when she appeared in several German films alongside her mother Eva-Maria Hagen. Around that same time, she joined the band Automobil and released the schlager single "Du hast den Farbfilm vergessen". After her stepfather Wolf Biermann's East German citizenship was withdrawn in 1976, Hagen followed him to Hamburg. Shortly afterwards, she was offered a record deal from CBS Records and formed the Nina Hagen Band. Their self-titled debut album was released in late 1978 to critical acclaim and was a commercial success selling over 250,000 copies. The band released one more album, Unbehagen, before their break-up in 1979.

In 1982, Hagen signed a new contract with CBS and released her debut solo album NunSexMonkRock, which became her first record to chart in the United States. She followed it with two more albums: Fearless (1983) and Nina Hagen in Ekstasy (1985), before her contract with CBS expired and was not renewed. In 1989, she was offered a record deal from Mercury Records. She released three albums on the label: Nina Hagen (1989), Street (1991), and Revolution Ballroom (1993). However, none of the albums achieved notable commercial success. Hagen made her musical comeback with the release of her album Return of the Mother (2000).

Besides her musical career, Hagen is also a voice-over actress. She wrote three autobiographies: Ich bin ein Berliner (1988), Nina Hagen: That's Why the Lady Is a Punk (2003), and Bekenntnisse (2010). She is also noted for her human and animal rights activism.

== Life and career ==
=== 1955–1976: Early life and career beginnings ===
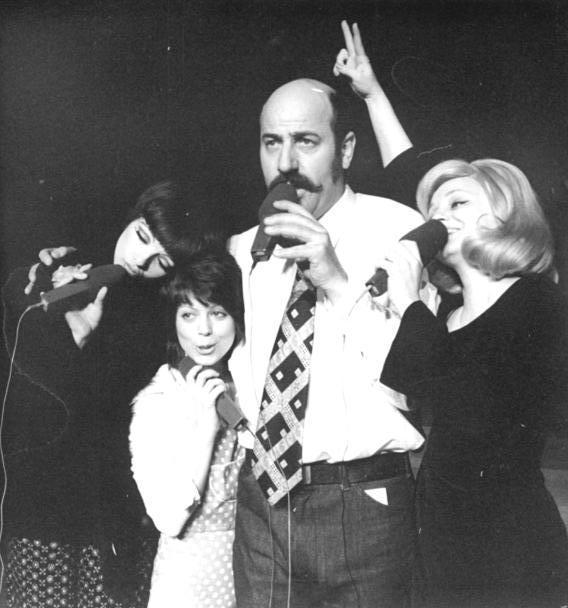
Hagen with Magdi Body, Manfred Krug, and Tatjana Archipowa, April 1976

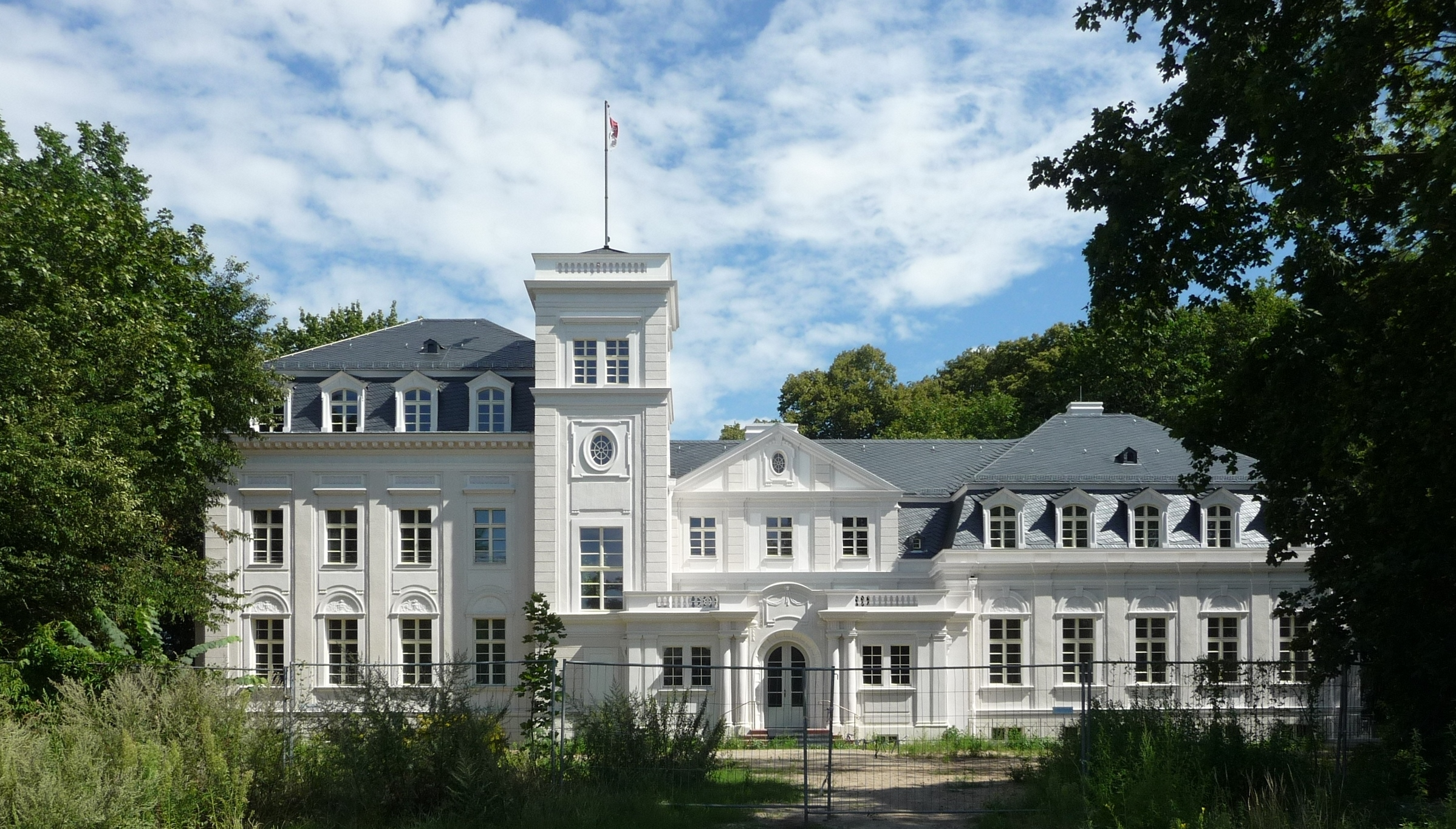
Villa Carlshagen, a villa owned by the Hagen family that was confiscated by the Nazis, Potsdam, 2016

Nina Hagen was born in what was then East Berlin, East Germany, the daughter of Hans Oliva-Hagen, a scriptwriter, and Eva-Maria Hagen (née Buchholz), an actress and singer. Descended from a once prominent Cologne banking family who founded Bankhaus A. Levy & Co., a bank that included BMW among its customers, her great-grandfather Carl Hagen was a banker and philanthropist. Her father Hans survived the Holocaust, being held as a prisoner at a prison in Moabit between 1941 and 1945 until the liberation by the Soviet Army. Her paternal grandfather Hermann Carl Hagen, who was Jewish, was murdered at the Sachsenhausen concentration camp on 28 May 1942, at age 56. Hedwig Elise Caroline Staadt, Nina's paternal grandmother, was also murdered at Sachsenhausen. Nina's maternal grandfather Fritz Buchholz died during World War II. The Nazis confiscated the Hagen family's properties, including Villa Carlshagen and Birlinghoven Castle. In 2020, the Beratende Kommission recommended compensation to Hagen heirs due to the theft of a painting.

Her parents divorced when she was two years old. During her childhood, she saw her father infrequently. At age four, she began to study ballet, and she was considered an opera prodigy by the time she was nine. When Hagen was 11, her mother had a relationship with Wolf Biermann, an anti-establishment singer-songwriter. Biermann's political views later influenced young Hagen. In the early 1970s, she joined the cover band Fritzens Dampferband ("Fritzen's Steamboat Band"), together with Achim Mentzel and others. She added songs by Janis Joplin and Tina Turner to the "allowable" set lists during shows. From 1972 to 1973, Hagen enrolled in the vocal training performance program at The Central Studio for Light Music in East Berlin (de). Upon graduating, she joined the band Automobil.

In East Germany, she performed with the band Automobil, becoming one of the country's best-known young stars. Her most famous song from the early part of her career was "Du hast den Farbfilm vergessen (You Forgot the Colour Film)", with words by Kurt Demmler to music by Michael Heubach, a subtle dig mocking the sterile, gray, Communist state, in 1974. Hagen performed comic songs like "Hatschi-Waldera" and "Was denn" in Karel Gott’s Czech TV show in Slaný. and "Wir tanzen Tango" in 1976.

=== 1976–1979 ===
Her label advised her to acclimatize herself to Western culture through travel, and she arrived in London in 1977 during the height of the punk rock movement. Hagen was quickly taken up by a circle that included The Slits.

Meanwhile, Hagen's public persona was steadily creating media uproar. She became infamous for an appearance on an Austrian evening talk show called Club 2, on 9 August 1979, on the topic of youth culture, when she demonstrated (while clothed, but explicitly) various female masturbation positions and became embroiled in a heated argument with other panelists, in particular, writer and journalist Humbert Fink. The talk show host, Dieter Seefranz, had to step down following this controversy.

She acted with Dutch rocker Herman Brood and singer Lene Lovich in the 1979 film Cha Cha. Brood and Hagen had a long romantic relationship, which ended when Hagen could no longer tolerate Brood's drug abuse. She would refer to Brood as her "soulmate" long after Brood committed suicide in 2001.

=== 1980–1988 ===
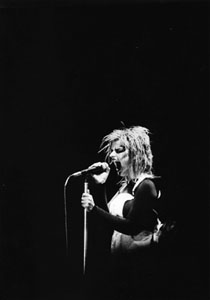
Hagen in 1980

In late 1980, Hagen became pregnant and broke up with the father-to-be Ferdinand Karmelk.

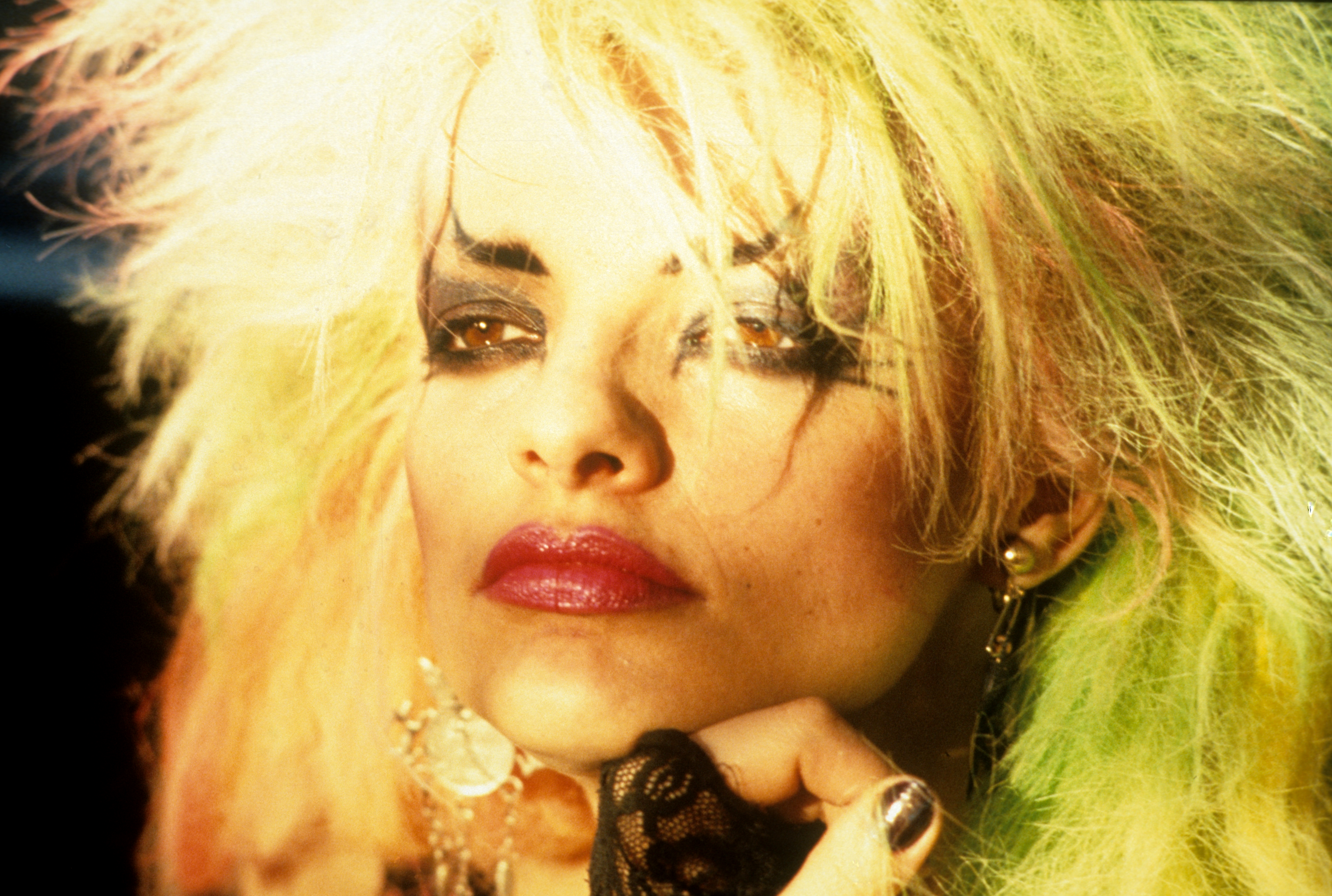
Hagen in 1981

Her 1985 album In Ekstase fared less well, but did generate club hits with "Universal Radio" (No. 39 USA) and a cover of "Spirit in the Sky" and also featured a 1979 recording of her hardcore punk take on Paul Anka's "My Way", which had been one of her signature live tunes in previous years. She performed songs from this album during the 1985 version of Rock in Rio. While in Brazil she met and befriended Brazilian musicians as diverse as samba diva Beth Carvalho and Brazilian punk singer Supla (who was leader of a punk-new wave band named Tokyo), that invited her to contribute vocals to the hit 1986 song "Garota de Berlim" (Portuguese for "girl from Berlin") that received huge airplay in radio in Brazil. To this day, Brazilians remember Nina above all things as the Berlin Girl from Tokyo's song.

Wilfried Rimensberger and award-winning film director Lothar Spree produced a TV documentary for the German television station ZDF. This was followed by a launch of Nina's UFO fashion underwear at anti-SAFT in Zurich, where again Rimensberger joined her up with New Romantic icon Steve Strange performing on stage. Simultaneously fashion photographer Hannes Schmid produced a Nina Hagen cover for German Cosmopolitan magazine. This also coincided with leading music publications like BRAVO and MusicSzene running cover stories that all put Hagen back on the forefront of something that, in retrospect, became a final highpoint of what the punk movement was all about. At the end of 1986, her contract with CBS was over and she released the Punk Wedding EP independently in 1987, a celebration of her marriage to an 17-year-old punk South African nicknamed 'Iroquois'. It followed an independent 1986 one-off single with Lene Lovich, "Don't Kill the Animals" (see Animal Liberation).

=== 1989–1994: Nina Hagen, Street, and Revolution Ballroom ===
In 1989, Hagen released the album, Nina Hagen, which was backed up by another German tour. In 1989, she had a relationship with French stylist and music manager Franck Chevalier which yielded their son, Otis Chevalier-Hagen (b. 1990).

=== 1995–1999 ===
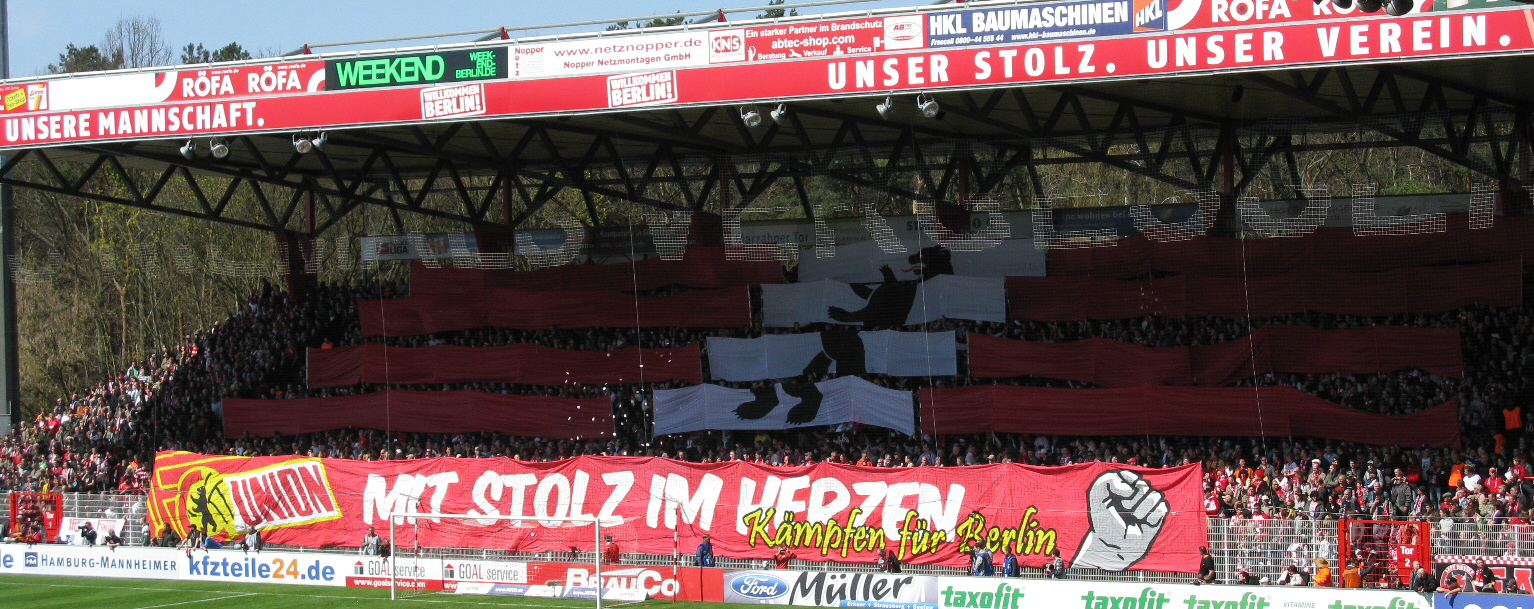
In 1998, Hagen recorded the official club anthem "Eisern Union" for 1. FC Union Berlin.

In May 1996, she married David Lynn; she divorced him in the beginning of 2000.

=== 2000–2009: Return of the Mother ===
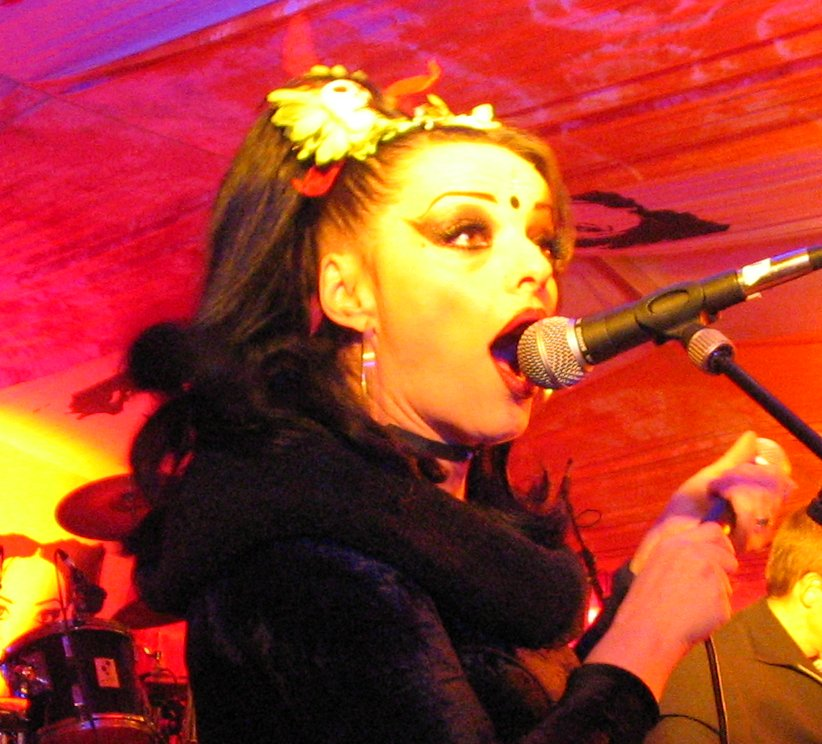
Hagen performing in Denmark, October 2003

In 2000, her song "Schön ist die Welt" became the official song of Expo 2000. Another cover of a Zarah Leander song "Der Wind hat mir ein Lied erzählt" was a minor hit the same year. The album Return of the Mother was released in February 2001, accompanied by another German tour. Hagen wrote the song "Handgrenade" on the album Return of the Mother for Christine Maggiore.

Hagen dubbed the voice of Sally in the German release of Tim Burton's The Nightmare Before Christmas, Yubaba/Zeniba in Spirited Away and she has also done voice work on the movie Hot Dogs by Michael Schoemann. Due to the death of Elisabeth Volkmann (†2006), the German voice of Marge, during the dubbing of the hit TV show The Simpsons 17th season, Nina was a strong contender for the role, which eventually went to Anke Engelke. Hagen has been featured on songs by other bands, for instance on Oomph!'s song "Fieber". She did a cover of Rammstein's "Seemann" with Apocalyptica. Later albums include Big Band Explosion (2003), in which she sang numerous swing covers with her then husband, Danish singer and performer, Lucas Alexander. This was followed by Heiß, a greatest hits album. The following album, Journey to the Snow Queen, is more of an audio book – she reads the Snow Queen fairy tale with Tchaikovsky's The Nutcracker in the background. In 2005 Nina Hagen headlined the Drop Dead Festival in New York City. Hagen was an active protester against the war in Iraq. In 2006 she was a part of the Popstars team. In August 2009 she was baptized in the Protestant Reformed church of Schüttorf. On 21 October after seven years passed she visited Moscow again.

=== 2010–present: Personal Jesus, Volksbeat, Unity and Highway to Heaven ===
When Angela Merkel ended her 16-year chancellorship of Germany in December 2021, she chose Hagen's song Du hast den Farbfilm vergessen (You Forgot the Colour Film) as one of the three pieces to be played at her Großer Zapfenstreich military leaving ceremony.

== Controversies ==
In 1987, she caught the attention of the media by announcing her marriage to a 17-year-old South African punk named Iroquois, whom she met in Rome in 1985. The song "Punk Wedding" was written for the wedding, and Hagen described the event as a marriage between the punk and new age movements. The wedding was scheduled on August 9, 1987.

== Discography ==
- Nina Hagen Band (1978)
- Unbehagen (1979)
- NunSexMonkRock (1982)
- Fearless/Angstlos (1983)
- Nina Hagen in Ekstasy/In Ekstase (1985)
- Nina Hagen (1989)
- Street (1991)
- Revolution Ballroom (1993)
- FreuD euch/BeeHappy (1995)
- Om Namah Shivay (1999)
- Return of the Mother (2000)
- Big Band Explosion (2003)
- Irgendwo auf der Welt (2006)
- Personal Jesus (2010)
- Volksbeat (2011)
- Unity (2022)
- Highway to Heaven (2026)

== Filmography ==
- Heiraten/Weiblich – 1975
- Heute ist Freitag – 1975
- Liebesfallen – 1976
- Unser stiller Mann – 1976
- Ticket of no Return (Bildnis einer Trinkerin) – 1979
- Cha-Cha – 1979
- Pankow '95 1983
- The Nightmare before Christmas – (German dub) 1993
- Lilien in der Bank – 1996
- Vasilisa – 2000
- 7 Dwarves – Men alone in the Wood – 2004
- 7 Zwerge – Der Wald ist nicht genug – 2006
- Buying the Band – 2013
- Gutterdämmerung – 2016

== See also ==
- Neue Deutsche Härte
