= Berlin Comedian Harmonists =

German vocal ensemble

- Origin: Berlin, Germany
- Genres: musical theatre, operetta, light classical
- Years active: 1997–present
- Members: Holger Off; Ralf Steinhagen; Olaf Drauschke; Philipp Seibert; Wolfgang Höltzel; Horst Maria Merz
- Past members: Marco Woytowicz; Günter Barton; Rolf Randolph; Tilmann F. Rönnebeck
- Website: berlin-comedian-harmonists.de

The Berlin Comedian Harmonists are a German vocal ensemble from Berlin, formed in 1997 and committed to recreating the repertoire of the original Comedian Harmonists of the late 1920s and early 1930s.

== Origin ==
The group has its origins in the ensemble brought together for the musical play Veronika, der Lenz ist da – Die Comedian Harmonists (Veronica, Spring Has Come – The Comedian Harmonists), which had its premiere on 19 December 1997 at the Komödie am Kurfürstendamm on the Kurfürstendamm in Berlin. This followed the screening of a film, Comedian Harmonists (1997), which like the musical was about a Berlin group, the "Comedian Harmonists", which flourished between 1927 and 1934, when it came to an end due to the rise of the National Socialists to power and their anti-Jewish measures. Most of the group's songs had been written by Jewish composers, and the group also had Jewish members who were prevented from performing. Following the success of the play which brought them together, the singers were several times asked to give gala performances and concerts outside the context of the original production, and a new musical group thus came into being.

The founding members were Olaf Drauschke and Guenter Barton (first and second baritones), Holger Off and Marco Woytowicz (first and second tenors), Tilmann F. Rönnebeck (bass), and Horst Maria Merz (pianist).

== History ==
After the closing of Veronika, the Berlin Comedian Harmonists soon found themselves singing around Germany and abroad, with appearances in Australia, the United States, Latin America, Spain, Italy, France, and Switzerland.

The group's repertory includes the well-known songs of the original pre-Second World War Comedian Harmonists, as well as other hit songs, their own arrangements, and original compositions including "Sabine", "Hummerschwanz" ('Lobster Tail'), and "Se Dici di Lasciarmi". The operetta Frau Luna was rewritten for the ensemble by Paul Lincke under the title of Die Comedian Harmonists besuchen Frau Luna ('The Comedian Harmonists Visit Frau Luna'), and this had its opening night at the Municipal Theatre, Hamelin, on 22 March 2006.

The Berlin Comedian Harmonists have appeared at concerts of André Rieu. They sing four songs on his DVD album I Lost My Heart in Heidelberg (2009): Veronika der Lenz ist Da, Irgendwo auf der Welt, Die Liebe der Matrosen, and with Carla Maffioletti and Mirusia Louwerse Adieu, Mein Kleiner Gardeoffizier.

Over the years since 1997 the membership of the ensemble has changed, with Ralf Steinhagen replacing Marco Woytowicz as second tenor, Philipp Seibert taking over from Günter Barton as second baritone, and first Rolf Randolph and later Wolfgang Höltzel taking the place of Tilmann F. Rönnebeck as bass.

Another change took place in summer 2018 when the pianist was replaced by Nikolai Orloff and the 2nd tenor by Norbert Kohler.

== Discography ==
- Veronika der Lenz ist da
- Ein Lied geht um die Welt
- Sabine
- Die Berlin Comedian Harmonists besuchen Frau Luna
- I Lost My Heart in Heidelberg (4 tracks on André Rieu concert DVD)

== Awards ==
- Goldene Vorhang (1998) — awarded by the Berliner Theaterclub
- Berliner Bär (1999) — awarded by the B.Z. newspaper
