= Hans Oliva-Hagen =

German writer (1922–1992)

- Born: Hans Hagen; 14 April 1922; Nikolassee, Berlin, Germany
- Died: 1992 (aged 69/70)
- Other names: Hans Oliva; John Ryder
- Occupations: Journalist, writer, screenwriter, activist
- Known for: Carbide and Sorrel
- Spouse: Eva-Maria Hagen
- Parents: Hermann Carl Hagen (father); Hedwig Elise Caroline Staadt (mother)
- Relatives: Nina Hagen, Cosma Shiva Hagen

Hans Oliva-Hagen (né Hagen; 14 April 1922 – 1992) was a journalist, writer, and screenwriter in the German Democratic Republic who wrote under the pseudonyms Hans Oliva and John Ryder. His most important works include his collaboration on the scripts for the DEFA film Carbide and Sorrel (1963) and the five-part GDR television film Conscience in Riot (1961). A militant opponent of fascism and a Holocaust survivor of patrilineal Jewish heritage, Oliva-Hagen was active in the German resistance to Nazism.

== Life ==
Hans Hagen was born in Berlin, the son of a German Jewish economist, banker, bank archivist, and anti-fascist activist, Hermann Carl Hagen. His mother, Hedwig Elise Caroline Staadt, was a German Christian. He attended boarding school in Switzerland, which he had to leave after completing elementary school. His brother Karl-Heinz Hagen worked as editor-in-chief for a number of German publications.

In 1937, he travelled to Spain to volunteer with the International Brigades, which fought on the side of the Republican government of Spain against the fascists under General Franco, but was turned down because of his young age. He then moved to France, where he worked in Marseille, among other places. He was employed as a dock worker. From 1940 on he lived in Berlin and was active in the resistance against the Nazis. In 1941 he was arrested by the police during an illegal leaflet campaign and imprisoned in the Moabit prison, where he was subjected to Nazi human experimentation. He was captured and tortured while trying to escape from the Dahlem Manor, where he was employed as a prison harvest worker. In 1945 the Soviet Red Army stormed and liberated Moabit Prison.

Hagen's father, Hermann, was murdered in the special campaign against Jews on 27 and 28 May 1942, an act of revenge by the Nazis after the assassination attempt on Reinhard Heydrich. Along with 500 other German Jews selected arbitrarily, Hagen was abducted from Berlin and taken to the Sachsenhausen concentration camp where he was murdered on 29 May 1942. His mother Hedwig was also murdered at Sachsenhausen.

He worked as a freelance journalist and author from 1952. Following the end of World War II, Hans Oliva-Hagen lived in East Berlin when it was administered by the Soviet Union, and joined the Socialist Unity Party of Germany. In 1963, the East German Communists sought out a "Communist Brigitte Bardot" to represent East Germany. Oliva-Hagen wrote in the East German publication Sonntag that the Soviet zone needed "a star who attracts audiences like Bardot" and who reflected the "Socialist way of life of our people". He was later expelled from the party due to criticism, initially working in radio and press administration.

On 4 May 1954, he married actress Eva-Maria Hagen in Berlin. The marriage ended in divorce in 1959. Their daughter Catharina "Nina" Hagen, born on 11 March 1955, stayed with her mother after the divorce. Nina became a singer and actress. Nina's daughter Cosma Shiva Hagen also became an actress.

== Filmography ==
- 1955: Das Stacheltier – Episode 41: Das Haushaltswunder (Idea)
- 1958: Im Sonderauftrag (Script with Heinz Thiel)
- 1961: Gewissen in Aufruhr, TV novel in 5 parts (Script with Günter Reisch and Hans-Joachim Kasprzik)
- 1962: Die letzte Chance (Script)
- 1963: Carbide and Sorrel (Script with Frank Beyer)
- 1963: Drei Kriege. 1. Tauroggen, DDR-Fernsehfilm (Script with Roland Gräf and Norbert Büchner)
- 1963: Der andere neben dir (Script with Ulrich Thein and Hartwig Strobel)
- 1964: Drei Kriege. 2. Hinter den Fronten, DDR-Fernsehfilm (Script with Roland Gräf und Norbert Büchner)
- 1965: Drei Kriege. 3. In Berlin, DDR-Fernsehfilm (Script with Roland Gräf and Norbert Büchner)
- 1966: Trick 17b, DDR-Fernsehfilm (Dramaturgy)
- 1966: Asse (Script with Karl Gass)

== Bibliography ==
- 1953: Asphalt, Tempo, Silberpfeile (Narrative, with Erich Rackwitz), Berlin, Verlag Neues Leben
- 1954: Auf die Plätze – fertig – los! (Narrative), Berlin, Verlag Neues Leben
- 1957: Die Sowjetunion von A–Z (with Erich Rackwitz)
- 1958: Bei unseren Soldaten. Aus dem Leben der Nationalen Volksarmee (with J. C. Schwarz), Berlin, Verlag des Ministeriums für Nationale Verteidigung

== Awards ==
- 1961 National Prize of the German Democratic Republic – 1st class for Art and Culture (part of a collective for the screenplay of Gewissen in Aufruhr)
