= Street (Nina Hagen album) =

Studio album by Nina Hagen
- Released: July 22, 1991
- Recorded: February 1990 – May 1991
- Studio: Eastcote and Voice Versa (London)
- Genre: Hip hop; trip hop; house; rock; hip pop
- Length: 50:11
- Label: Mercury
- Producer: Zeus B. Held

Nina Hagen chronology
| Nina Hagen (1989) | Street (1991) | Revolution Ballroom (1993) |

Singles from Street
- 1. "Berlin (ist dufte) / Erfurt & Gera" Released: 1991; 2. "In My World" Released: 1991; 3. "Blumen für die Damen" Released: 1991

Professional ratings
Review scores
| Source | Rating |
|---|---|
| AllMusic | 2/5 stars |

Street is the fifth solo (and seventh overall) studio album by German singer Nina Hagen released on July 22, 1991, by Mercury Records. The album is produced by Zeus B. Held with songs written mostly by Hagen. It features songs in both, English and German. Hagen also worked with Anthony Kiedis and John Frusciante of Red Hot Chili Peppers or with English dance music producer Adamski, with whom she later recorded the song "Get Your Body". After toning down her image with the release of her 1989 album Nina Hagen, she kept on making more downtempo songs, this time, with elements of hip hop. Three singles from the album were released, "In My World", "Berlin" and "Blumen Für Die Damen". Street also contains a cover version of the hit song "Good Vibrations" by The Beach Boys.

The cover of the album features Hagen wearing three different outfits designed by Jean Paul Gaultier and Vivienne Westwood, with her name written in a Walt Disney-logo-resembling font.

== Track listing ==
| No. | Title | Writer(s) | Length |
|---|---|---|---|
| 1. | "Blumen für die Damen" (featuring MC Shan) | Heinz Gietz; Joachim Fuchsberger | 3:58 |
| 2. | "Divine Love, Sex and Romance" | John Frusciante; Nina Hagen; Zeus B. Held | 4:25 |
| 3. | "Ruler of My Heart" | Allen Toussaint as Naomi Neville | 3:56 |
| 4. | "Love Hi" | Hagen and Zeus B. Held | 4:25 |
| 5. | "Keep It Live" | Hagen; Bee La Key; Nattie Williams | 4:19 |
| 6. | "Berlin (is dufte!)" | Hagen; Billy Liesegang; Andy Frazer | 3:55 |
| 7. | "In My World" | Wolfgang Jünger; Denis Miller | 4:19 |
| 8. | "Gretchen" | Franz Schubert; Johann Wolfgang von Goethe | 5:22 |
| 9. | "Erfurt & Gera" | Hagen; Wamsy Osthand | 2:50 |
| 10. | "All 4 Franckie" | Hagen; Held; Adamski | 4:25 |
| 11. | "Nina 4 President" (featuring MC Shan) | Hagen; Held; Anthony Kiedis | 4:06 |
| 12. | "Good Vibrations" | Brian Wilson; Mike Love | 4:11 |
| Total length: | | | 50:11 |

== Personnel ==
- Nina Hagen – vocals, songwriter, arranging
- Zeus B. Held – producer, keyboards, saxophone, programming
- Billy Liesegang – guitar, bass
- Dierk Hill – guitar, bass, programming
- Ingo Vauk – guitar, bass, engineer
- Joniece Jamison – guitar, bass
- Adam Woods – drums, percussion
- Luís Jardim – drums, percussion, programming
- Cesare Marcher – drums, percussion
- Nick Fisher – programming
- P. P. Arnold – backing vocals
- Madeline Bell – backing vocals
- Be La Key – backing vocals
- Eddé Muse – backing vocals
- MC Shan – vocals on "Blumen für die Damen" and "Nina 4 President"
- Nattie Williams – vocals on "Keep It Live"
- Otis Hagen Chevalier – vocals on "Keep It Live"

Technical

- Philip Bagenal – engineer
- Charles Steel – engineer
