= Cosma Shiva Hagen =

German actress

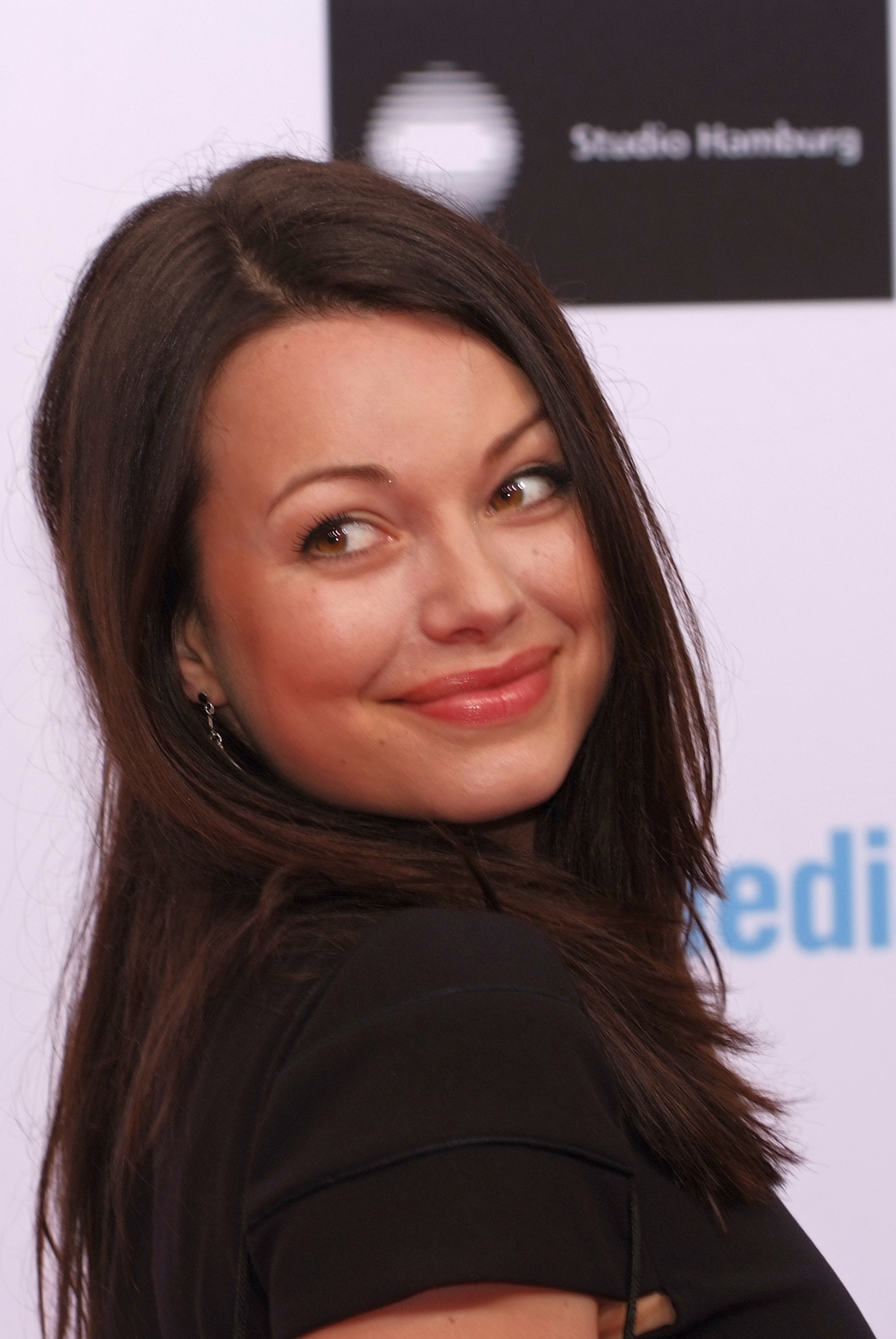
- Hagen in 2012
- Occupation: Actress
- Years active: 1996–present

Cosma Shiva Hagen (German: [ˈkɔsma ˈʃiːva ˈhaːɡn̩]) is an American-German actress, born in LA. Although she speaks English, her acting roles have been largely confined to German-language films and television productions. She also starred in an Irish film called Short Order (2005).

== Personal life ==
Hagen's maternal grandfather Hans Oliva-Hagen was a Holocaust survivor, being held at a prison in Moabit between 1941 and 1945 until liberation by the Soviets. Her mother is the German singer, songwriter, and actress Nina Hagen. Her maternal grandmother was the singer and actress Eva-Maria Hagen.

== Selected filmography ==
- Das merkwürdige Verhalten geschlechtsreifer Großstädter zur Paarungszeit (1998), as Sandra
- Der Laden (1998, TV miniseries), as Ilonka
- Die fabelhaften Schwestern (2002, TV film), as Effi
- 7 Dwarves – Men Alone in the Wood (2004), as Snow White
- Short Order (2005), as Catherine
- 7 Dwarves: The Forest Is Not Enough (2006), as Snow White
- Cutting Edge (2007), as Sylvia Göbel
- Schade um das schöne Geld (2008, TV film), as Gloria Hasselt
- Bible Code (2008, TV film), as Johanna Bachmann
- Fire! (2009), as Nicole Hart
- Schief gewickelt (2011, TV film), as Mona Müller
- The Man Cave (2014), as Connie
