= FreuD euch =

freuD euch

Studio album by Nina Hagen
- Released: November 4, 1995
- Recorded: 1994–95
- Studios: Conny's Studio, Cologne, Germany
- Genre: Punk rock
- Length: 41:21
- Label: Ariola
- Producers: Nina Hagen, Toubab, Ralf Goldkind

Nina Hagen chronology
Revolution Ballroom (1993)	freuD euch (1995)	BeeHappy (1996)

Singles from freuD euch
- 1. "Tiere" Released: 1995; 2. "Abgehaun" Released: 1996; 3. "Sonntagmorgen" Released: 1996

FreuD euch is the seventh solo (and ninth overall) studio album by Nina Hagen. It was released on November 4, 1995, on Ariola. The record has the punk feel of her first album, with short, caustic guitar-driven tracks. The cover artwork includes three holographic designs amongst holographic flowers, which when tilted from right to left show Hagen spelling something.

== Track listing ==
All tracks composed by Nina Hagen; except where noted.

1. "(Another Junkie) Einfach Nina" 1:20
2. "Lass mich in Ruhe!" (Hagen, Dee Dee Ramone) 1:48
3. "Stacheldraht" 2:50
4. "Tiere" (Hagen, Ralf Goldkind) 3:27
5. "Zero Zero U.F.O." (German version) (Hagen, Dee Dee Ramone) 2:34
6. "Gloria Halleluja Amen" (Hagen, Ralf Goldkind) 1:45
7. "Geburt" (Hagen, Ralf Goldkind) 3:40
8. "Sonntag Morgen" (Lou Reed, John Cale) 3:27
9. "Abgehaun" (Hagen, Dee Dee Ramone) 3:41
10. "Freiheitslied" 3:19
11. "Wende" 1:59
12. "Kunst" 2:41
13. "Riesenschritt" (Carole King, Gerry Goffin) 3:04
14. "Sternmädchen" (Hagen, Dee Dee Ramone) 2:49
15. "Elefantengott Jai Ganesh" (Ralf Goldkind, Rai Das) 2:57

Note

- The last song's length is indicated as 2:57 on the record's sleeve; in fact, "Elefantengott Jai Ganesh" lasts 5:03, and is followed by a 30 seconds silence and a cover of "Pank" (which already closed "Nina Hagen Band"), resulting in a 7:07 track.

== Personnel ==
- Nina Hagen – vocals
- Chris Hughes – bass, guitar
- Dee Dee Ramone – rhythm guitar (tracks 1, 2, 5, 9)
- Ralf Goldkind – guitar, bass, keyboards, programming
- Fred Thurley – guitar
- David Nash – programming
- Rai Das – noise
- Andy Birr – percussion
- Ash Wednesday – bass, programming
