= Nina Hagen discography =

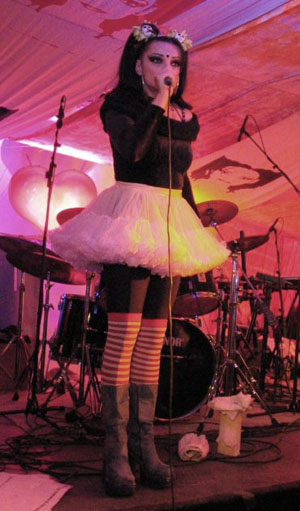
- Nina Hagen performing in Aalborg, Denmark (October 2003)
- Studio albums: 17
- Extended plays: 1
- Soundtrack albums: 1
- Live albums: 5
- Compilation albums: 25
- Singles: 57
- Video albums: 1
- Music videos: 24
- Demos: 1
- Audiobooks: 1
- Box sets: 9

German singer Nina Hagen has released 17 studio albums, 25 compilation albums, one soundtrack album and one extended play. Hagen first signed with CBS Records in 1976 with her group the Nina Hagen Band. In 1979, she detached herself from the band and released three solo albums on the label. In 1986, her contract with CBS expired and was not renewed. In 1989, Hagen signed with Mercury Records, on which label she released three new albums.

== Albums ==
=== Studio albums ===
Title	Album details	Peak chart positions							
Title	Album details	US	AUT	GER	NL	NOR	NZ	SWE	SWI
Nina Hagen Band	Released: August 31, 1978; Label: CBS; Formats: LP, cassette	—	24	11	7	—	—	—	—
Unbehagen	Released: February 25, 1980; Label: CBS; Formats: LP, cassette	—	9	2	19	10	40	8	—
NunSexMonkRock	Released: April 30, 1982; Label: CBS; Formats: LP, cassette	184	—	27	—	18	38	—	—
Angstlos / Fearless	Released: August 19, 1983 / November 4, 1983; Label: CBS; Formats: LP, cassette	151	11	24	40	—	47	—	—
In Ekstasy / In Ekstase	Released: May 1985; Label: CBS; Formats: LP, CD, cassette	— (Note: Nina Hagen in Ekstasy did not enter the Billboard 200, but peaked at number one on the "Bubbling Under the Top LPs" chart.)	13	24	—	—	43	36	13
Nina Hagen	Released: August 23, 1989; Label: Mercury; Formats: LP, CD, cassette	—	24	20	—	—	—	—	26
Street	Released: July 22, 1991; Label: Mercury; Formats: LP, CD, cassette	—	39	36	—	—	—	—	32
Revolution Ballroom	Released: September 28, 1993; Label: Mercury; Formats: LP, CD, cassette	—	—	—	—	—	—	—	—
FreuD euch / BeeHappy	Released: November 4, 1995 / April 1996; Label: Ariola, RCA; Formats: CD	—	—	—	—	—	—	—	—
Om Namah Shivay	Released: February 11, 1999; Label: Smart ASS; Formats: CD	—	—	—	—	—	—	—	—
Return of the Mother	Released: February 14, 2000; Label: Orbit, Virgin; Formats: CD	—	49	77	—	—	—	—	—
Big Band Explosion	Released: November 17, 2003; Label: SPV; Formats: CD	—	—	—	—	—	—	—	—
Irgendwo auf der Welt	Released: March 24, 2006; Label: Island; Formats: CD	—	—	62	—	—	—	—	—
Personal Jesus	Released: July 16, 2010; Label: Koch; Formats: CD	—	62	16	—	—	—	—	61
Volksbeat	Released: November 11, 2011; Label: Koch; Formats: CD	—	—	—	—	—	—	—	—
Unity	Released: December 9, 2022; Label: Grönland; Format: LP, CD	—	—	30	—	—	—	—	27
Highway to Heaven	Released: March 27, 2026; Label: Grönland; Format: LP, CD	—	56	13	—	—	—	—	–

=== Live albums ===
Title	Year
Nina Hagen & The No Problem Orchechestra In Concert	1984
Ninamania	1992
Krefelder Appell - Keine Atomraketen	2001
1008 Indische Nächte Live	2002
Nina Hagen & Karl Rucker Live In Concert	2010

=== Compilation albums ===
Title	Year
World Now	1986
Love	1987
The Very Best of Nina Hagen	1990
Adam Ant - Nina Hagen	1991
Du hast den Farbfilm vergessen (Rock aus Deutschland Ost Vol. 12)	1992
Collection Gold	1992
In My World	1993
Definitive Collection	1995
My Way From '78 - '94	1995
Was Denn... Hits '74 - '95	1996
14 Friendly Abductions	1996
Bahnhof Carbonara	1997
Prima Nina In Ekstasy	2000
Simply The Best	2000
Sternenmädchen	2001
Portrait	2001
History Of Rock	2001
The Collection	2003
TV-Glotzer	2004
Rangeh'n	2004
Heiß	2005
My Way	2005
In My World	2012
All Time Best	2014
Was Denn...? – The Amiga Recordings	2020

=== Soundtracks ===
Title	Album details	Peak chart positions							
Title	Album details	US	AUT	GER	NL	NOR	NZ	SWE	SWI
Cha Cha	Released: 1979; Label: Ariola, CBS; Formats: LP, cassette	—	—	—	28	—	—	—	—

=== Extended plays ===
Title	Year
Nina Hagen Band	1980

=== Demos ===
Title	Year
Prophecy Fulfilled (Demos from 1982-1990)	2010

=== Audiobooks ===
Title	Year
Bekenntnisse	2010

== Singles ==
=== 1970s ===
Year	Single	Peak positions			Album
Year	Single	GER	AUT	SWI	Album
1974	"Du hast den Farbfilm vergessen" (as Nina Hagen & Automobil)	—	—	—	singles only
1975	"He, wir fahren auf's Land" (as Nina Hagen & Automobil)	—	—	—	singles only
1975	"Hatschi-Waldera"	—	—	—	singles only
1976	"Ich Bin Da Gar Nicht Pingelig"	—	—	—	singles only
1976	"Hey, wir fahren auf's Land"	—	—	—	singles only
1978	"TV-Glotzer"	—	—	—	Nina Hagen Band (by Nina Hagen Band)
1978	"Auf'm Bahnhof Zoo"	—	—	—	Nina Hagen Band (by Nina Hagen Band)
1979	"Naturträne"	—	—	—	Nina Hagen Band (by Nina Hagen Band)
1979	"Unbeschreiblich Weiblich"	—	—	—	Nina Hagen Band (by Nina Hagen Band)
1979	"Herman's Door"	—	—	—	Cha Cha

=== 1980s ===
Year	Single	Peak positions				Album
Year	Single	US Dance	GER	AUT	SWI	Album
1980	"African Reggae"	—	—	—	—	Unbehagen (by Nina Hagen Band)
1980	"Herrmann Hiess Er"	—	—	—	—	Unbehagen (by Nina Hagen Band)
1980	"Auf'm Rummel"	—	—	—	—	Unbehagen (by Nina Hagen Band)
1980	"My Way"	—	—	—	—	In Ekstasy / In Ekstase
1982	"Smack Jack"	—	-	—	—	NunSexMonkRock
1983	"New York / N.Y." / "New York New York (english version)"	9	—	—	—	Angstlos / Fearless
1983	"Zarah (Ich weiss, es wird einmal ein wunder geschehn)" / "Zarah (Remix) (english version)"	45	—	—	—	Angstlos / Fearless
1983	"The Change"	—	—	—	—	Angstlos / Fearless
1985	"Universelles Radio" / "Universal Radio (english version)"	39	—	—	—	In Ekstasy / In Ekstase
1985	"Gott im Himmel (Spirit In The Sky)"	—	—	—	—	In Ekstasy / In Ekstase
1986	"World Now"	—	—	—	—	Love
1986	"Don't Kill The Animals" (with Lene Lovich)	—	—	—	—	Animal Liberation
1987	"Punkhochzeit" / "Punk Wedding (english version)"	—	—	—	—	single only
1989	"Hold Me"	—	—	—	—	Nina Hagen
1989	"Michail, Michail (Gorbachev Rap) / Hold Me"	—	—	—	—	Nina Hagen
1989	"Las Vegas"	—	—	—	—	Nina Hagen
1989	"Ave Maria"	—	—	—	—	Nina Hagen
1989	"New York / N.Y. (Ben Liebrand Remix)"	—	—	—	—	single only
"—" denotes releases that did not chart or were not released.

=== 1990s ===
Year	Single	Peak positions			Album
Year	Single	GER	AUT	SWI	Album
1990	"Love Heart Attack"	—	—	—	Nina Hagen
1991	"Berlin (ist dufte) / Erfurt & Gera"	—	—	—	Street
1991	"In My World"	—	—	19	Street
1991	"Blumen für die Damen"	—	—	—	Street
1992	"Go Ahead" (from VW Polo advert)	—	—	—	single only
1992	"Du hast den Farbfilm vergessen"	—	—	—	Du hast den Farbfilm vergessen (Rock aus Deutschland Ost Vol.12)
1993	"African Reggae Remix '93"	—	—	—	single only
1994	"So Bad"	—	—	—	Revolution Ballroom
1994	"Pillow Talk"	—	—	—	Revolution Ballroom
1995	"Tiere"	—	—	—	FreuD euch / Bee Happy
1996	"Abgehaun"	—	—	—	FreuD euch / Bee Happy
1996	"Sonntagmorgen"	—	—	—	FreuD euch / Bee Happy
1997	"Dead Cities / I'm A Believer" (Split-single with Live Action Pussy Show)	—	—	—	singles only
1998	"Eisern Union!" (1. FC Union Berlin official song)	—	—	—	singles only
"—" denotes releases that did not chart or were not released.

=== 2000s–present ===
Year	Single	Peak positions			Album
Year	Single	GER	AUT	SWI	Album
2000	"Der Wind hat mir ein Lied erzählt"	96	—	—	Return of the Mother
2000	"Schön Ist Die Welt / Der Wind Hat Mir Ein Lied Erzählt" (from EXPO advert)	—	—	—	singles only
2004	"Immer Lauter" (Life Ball 2004 official song)	—	28	—	singles only
2007	"Zieh die Schuhe aus"	—	—	—	singles only
2020	"Rangehn (AMIGA Version)"	—	—	—	Was Denn...? The Amiga Recordings
2020	"Honigmann"	—	—	—	Was Denn...? The Amiga Recordings
2020	"Unity"	—	—	—	Unity
2022	"Shadrack"	—	—	—	Unity
2022	"16 Tons"	—	—	—	Unity
2022	"United Women Of The World"	—	—	—	Unity
2022	"Unity (Agar Agar Remix)"	—	—	—	Unity
2023	"Gib Mir Deine Liebe (ÄTNA Remix)"	—	—	—	Unity
2023	"Geld, Geld, Geld (DAEDE Remix)"	—	—	—	Unity
2023	"Geld, Geld, Geld (Perera Elsewhere Remix)"	—	—	—	Unity
2023	"Nina Hagen sings Larry Norman" (Rock The Flock / UFO)	—	—	—	singles only
2024	"Stille Nacht"	—	—	—	singles only
2025	"Somebody Prayed For Me"	—	—	—	Highway To Heaven
"—" denotes releases that did not chart or were not released.

=== Promotional singles ===
Year	Single	Peak positions			Album
Year	Single	GER	AUT	SWI	Album
1985	"Spirit In The Sky" (Nina Hagen en España)	—	—	—	In Ekstasy / In Ekstase
1991	"Good Vibrations"	—	—	—	Street
1993	"Revolution Ballroom"	—	—	—	Revolution Ballroom
2010	"Personal Jesus"	—	—	—	Personal Jesus
2022	"It Doesn't Matter Now"	—	—	—	Unity
"—" denotes releases that did not chart or were not released.

=== As featured artist ===
Year	Artist / Single	Peak positions				Album
Year	Artist / Single	GER	AUT	SWI	UK	Album
1977	Fritzens Dampferband - "Eine Violine bin ich nicht"	—	—	—	—	—
1981	Udo Lindenberg - "Berlin"	—	—	—	—	Berlin (EP)
1988	Udo Lindenberg - "Die Klavierlehrerin"	—	—	—	—	CasaNova
1988	Udo Lindenberg - "Airport (Dich Wiedersehn'n...)"	45	—	—	—	CasaNova
1988	Bernward Büker - "Die kleinen grünen Männchen"	—	—	—	—	Knochenherz
1992	Adamski - "Get Your Body!"	—	—	—	68	Naughty
1993	Udo Lindenberg - "Romeo & Juliaaah"	—	—	—	—	Panik-Panther
1993	Udo Lindenberg & Uwe Ochsenknecht - "Let The Sunshine In"	—	—	—	—	Hair: Die Deutsche Neuaufnahme 1993
1994	Freaky Fukin Weirdoz - "Hit Me with Your Rhythm Stick"	—	—	—	—	Mao Mak Maa
1996	Rick Jude - "Alchemy Of Love"	—	—	—	—	Tenchi-Muyo! In Love
1996	BAP - "Weihnachtsnaach"	—	—	—	—	Amerika
1998	Thomas D - "Solo"	15	36	26	—	Solo
1999	Oomph! - "Fieber"	—	—	—	—	Plastik
2000	Die Erben der Scherben - "Komm, schlaf bei mir/Keine Macht für Niemand"	—	—	—	—	Keine Macht für Niemand
2001	Rosenstolz - "Total Eclipse/Die schwarze Witwe"	22	—	—	—	Kassengift
2001	Loka Nunda - "Sweet Lord"	—	—	—	—	Sweet Lord Concept Album
2002	Michael von der Heide - "Kriminaltango"	—	—	—	—	Frisch
2002	Schwarze Puppen - "Tanz!"	—	—	—	—	Afraid Of Us
2003	Beginner - "Fäule/Wer bistn du"	17	55	52	—	Blast Action Heroes
2003	Apocalyptica - "Seemann"	13	35	73	—	Reflections
2004	Rosenstolz - "Liebe ist alles/La Veuve Noir"	6	47	—	—	Herz
2008	Various artists - "Am Anfang steht immer ein Traum"	—	—	—	—	Das silberne Segel
2008	Gonzales & Various artists - "Love Is All"	—	—	—	—	—
2009	S.U.N. Project - "Dance Of The Witches"	—	—	—	—	X Black Album
2011	Loka Nunda - "My Sweet Lord (Gospel House Mix)"	—	—	—	—	Sweet Lord Concept Album
2015	Arling & Cameron - "Good Times/Eve"	—	—	—	—	Good Times
2023	iskwē - "I Get High"	—	—	—	—	nīna
"—" denotes releases that did not chart or were not released.

== Videography ==
=== Video albums ===
Year	Title	Peak positions			Notes
Year	Title	GER	AUT	SWI	Notes
2012	"Live @ Rockpalast"	—	—	—	Dortmund, Westfalenhalle, December 9, 1978; Bonn, Rheinaue, August 28, 1999
"—" denotes releases that did not chart or were not released.

=== Music videos ===
Title	Year
African Reggae	1980
Herrmann Hiess Er	1980
Smack Jack	1982
Zarah (Ich weiß, es wird einmal ein Wunder gescheh'n)	1983
New York/N.Y.	1983
New York/N.Y. (english version)	1984
Universal Radio	1985
Spirit In The Sky (unreleased)	1985
Don't Kill The Animals (with Lene Lovich)	1986
Hold Me	1989
In My World	1991
Get Your Body! (with Adamski)	1992
Go Ahead	1992
So Bad	1994
Tiere	1995
Solo (with Thomas D.)	1998
My Sweeet Lord (with Loka Nunda)	1998
Fieber (with Oomph!)	1999
Der Wind hat mir ein Lied erzählt	2000
Seemann (with Apocalyptica)	2003
Immer lauter	2004
Killer (with Adamski) (unreleased)	2010
16 Tons	2022
United Women Of The World	2022
I Am Born To Preach The Gospel	2025
Somebody Prayed For Me	2025

== Box sets & promo boxes ==
=== Box sets ===
Title	Year
Nina Hagen Band + Unbehagen (2 CD)	1983
Nina Hagen Band + Unbehagen (2 LP)	1989
Nina Hagen Band + Unbehagen (2 CD)	1992
Original Album Classics: Nina Hagen (3 CD)	2012
Personal Jesus + Volksbeat (2 CD)	2015
Original Vinyl Classics: Nina Hagen Band (2 LP)	2019

=== Promo boxes ===
Title	Year
Nina Hagen (CD promo box)	1989
Street (Mini CD promo box)	1991
Revolution Ballroom (4 CD promo box)	1993
