= Jim Rakete =

German photographer

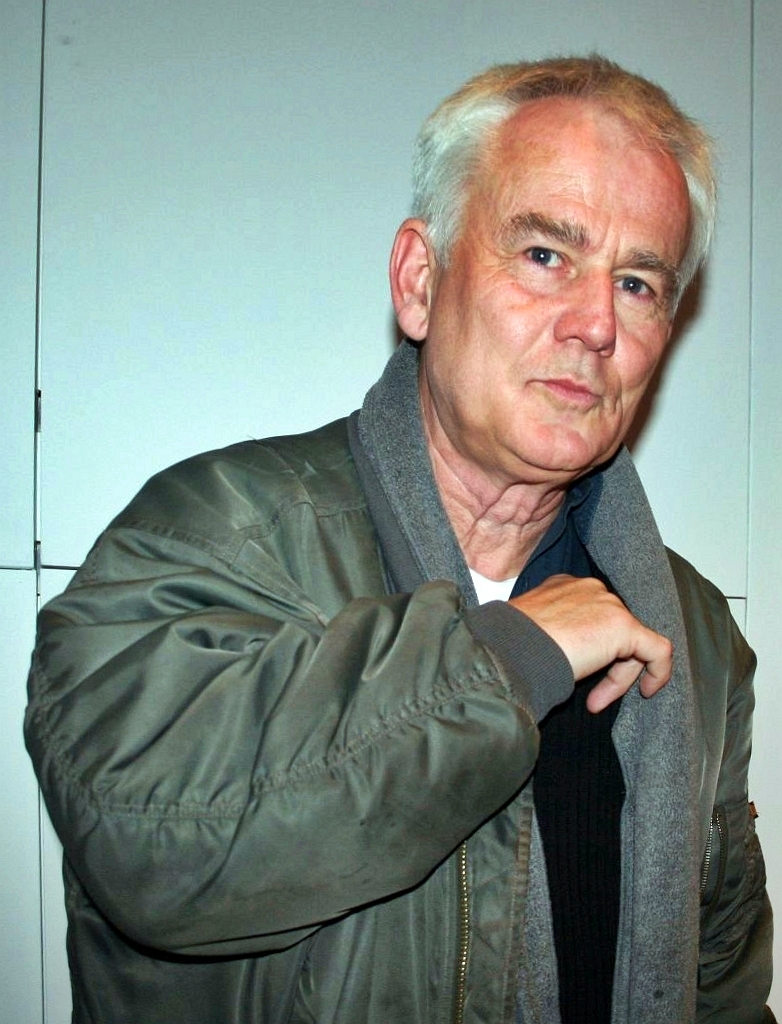
- Jim Rakete, 2008
- Born: Günther Rakete; 1 January 1951 (age 75); West Berlin, West Germany
- Occupations: photographer, filmmaker, writer

Günther "Jim" Rakete (German: [dʒɪm ʁakeːtə]; born 1 January 1951) is a German photographer, photojournalist, filmmaker, writer and producer based in Berlin.

Rakete shot numerous personalities from the German and international music and film scene and politics. His managerial work behind the award-winning musical acts Nina Hagen Band, Interzone, Nena and Die Ärzte made Rakete a decisive figure in the burgeoning German New Wave.

Rakete has had extended living and production periods in Los Angeles, California, and Hamburg, Germany. In 2001, he returned to Berlin, Germany, where he remains engaged in various fields including film, photography, writing, theater, music, and production.

== Early life ==
Rakete spent his childhood in West Berlin. At four years old, he was given his first camera, an Agfa box camera, similar to a Brownie, which accompanied him for years. Rakete continued photographing throughout his school years; fascinated by the mechanisms of photography, he spent a good part of his youth working in the darkroom. At age seventeen, he began to work as a photojournalist for local dailies, agencies and magazines, while still delivering newspapers to raise the money to buy his first drum kit. His early band efforts lead him towards his personal pathway into the music world.

As the student movement extended to West Germany in the late 1960s, Rakete brought his eye and camera to document the people, settings and discussions emerging at the time; he was a photojournalist by day and a musicians' photographer by night. By his early twenties, he was working for West German newspapers while keeping on shooting album band covers. Between 1975 and 1976, Rakete developed several magazines for Bauer Verlag Munich while commuting between Munich and West Berlin.

== Fabrik Rakete and Music Management ==
In 1977, Rakete rented a 300-square-meter loft in the heart of West Berlin's borough of Kreuzberg. Fabrik Rakete, a creative laboratory for music, photography and art, was born. In the two shooting spaces that were built, Rakete's work became crucial for the advancement of the burgeoning German New Wave.

Through a chance encounter, Rakete came across the remarkable voice of a sheer powerful 4-octave miracle: Nina Hagen. Rakete took her first pictures in the then barren, newly funded Fabrik Rakete. Shortly thereafter, CBS, with which Hagen had already signed a recording deal, appointed Rakete as band manager for the newly formed Nina Hagen Band to focus on the launch of the eponymous album in 1978. Successful performances in the Quartier Latin and airplay on West German Radio promoted their debut record, which eventually peaked at number eleven in West Germany while also gathering substantial success in Austria and the Netherlands. Nina Hagen Band was certified gold in France and it went double platinum in West Germany. As Nina unexpectedly quit the project, the band was orphan of its main member just as the demand for appearances exploded, with the band still under the CBS deal. Eventually, Rakete, Hagen and the band agreed to record their second and last album, Unbehagen (1979). The album went gold in West Germany and France, selling over 300.000 copies in West Germany alone. Despite Hagen's departure, Rakete consolidated his bond with the band, which eventually went on performing under the name Spliff. The new band (which also included members of rock theater group Lok Kreuzberg) and Rakete embarked on the writing of a small rock opera in the form of a radio show, using the AFN legend Rik Delisle as host, Aussie performer Alf Klimek "Klimax" as singer, and with the later addition of Dutch singer Josee van Irsel. The Spliff Radio Show premiered live at Kant-Kino on 2 May 1980. Tours ensued, and in 1982 the band released their greatest success, 85555, named after the record's catalogue number. Their following album, Herzlichen Glückwunsch! was released in the later months of the same year.

In the meantime, Spliff and the Fabrik doubled in size the roster of artists: the studios were slowly transforming into a veritable Rock ‘n’ Roll hot shop, with new releases by Interzone and the Edo Zanki Band. The Fabrik studios ran ceaselessly with Rakete developing campaigns, shooting record covers or posters by day, while musicians and producers sent out banners and press material across West Berlin and West German media at night.

The Fabrik had long moved to West Berlin's Oranienplatz when the members of Spliff started producing emerging artists. Their first production was the 1983 international chart success Nena, Gabriele "Nena" Kerner's first album. An instant hit, the Nena Band toured countless European TVs and live stages, while the album's second single 99 Luftballons peaked #1 in music charts worldwide including Australia, Japan, Austria, Canada, Ireland, the Netherlands, New Zealand, Sweden, Switzerland and the United Kingdom. Rakete says about Nena, "she could get anything across without explaining…...That's an ability that is very rare. I do not know anyone of that caliber".

Christiane F., subject of the book Zoo Station: The Story of Christiane F., gave a tape of Nena's song to the DJ Rodney Bingenheimer who later aired the single on Californian rock radio WLIR, taking the song to #2 on US Billboard Hot 100. "Even if in German, people felt what 99 Balloons meant and that was enoug...… It's like a good picture; it's unforgettabl,e" Rakete later said about the hit single.

In 1985 Rakete's management was chosen to produce Band für Afrika, the West German counterpart of Band Aid. The resulting single record was written by Herbert Grönemeyer and Wolfgang Niedeken and performed by 27 different West German bands and musicians, including Alphaville, BAP, Marius Müller-Westernhagen, Nena, Peter Maffay, Spliff and Udo Lindenberg. Band für Afrika gathered over 150 million Deutschmarks.

Meanwhile, Rakete had met the punk band Die Ärzte and put them in touch with CBS. Die Ärzte went on to be one of Germany's most successful bands. This was the final chapter of Fabrik Rakete, which was finally closed off in 1987. Spliff went on producing music through a new venture. Rakete left the producing desk to fully focus on writing and photography full-time except in 1988–89, when he funded label ACT Music along with former president of Warner Bros. Europe Siegfried Loch and Ideal's lead singer Annette Humpe. The label, which specializes in European jazz, is active today.

== Photography ==
(Jim Rakete is) a photographer who over a period of thirty years has photographed other people with a unique kind of love, and who allows them to reveal themselves to him without holding anything back. You can’t hold anything back when faced with someone who doesn’t judge. You can feel his openness in these photos…. His book is a diary of feelings and relationships with people he has met. You can feel that he gives something to, rather than takes something away from those he photographs.

— Peter Lindbergh, Jim Rakete: Photographien 1977 - 1997

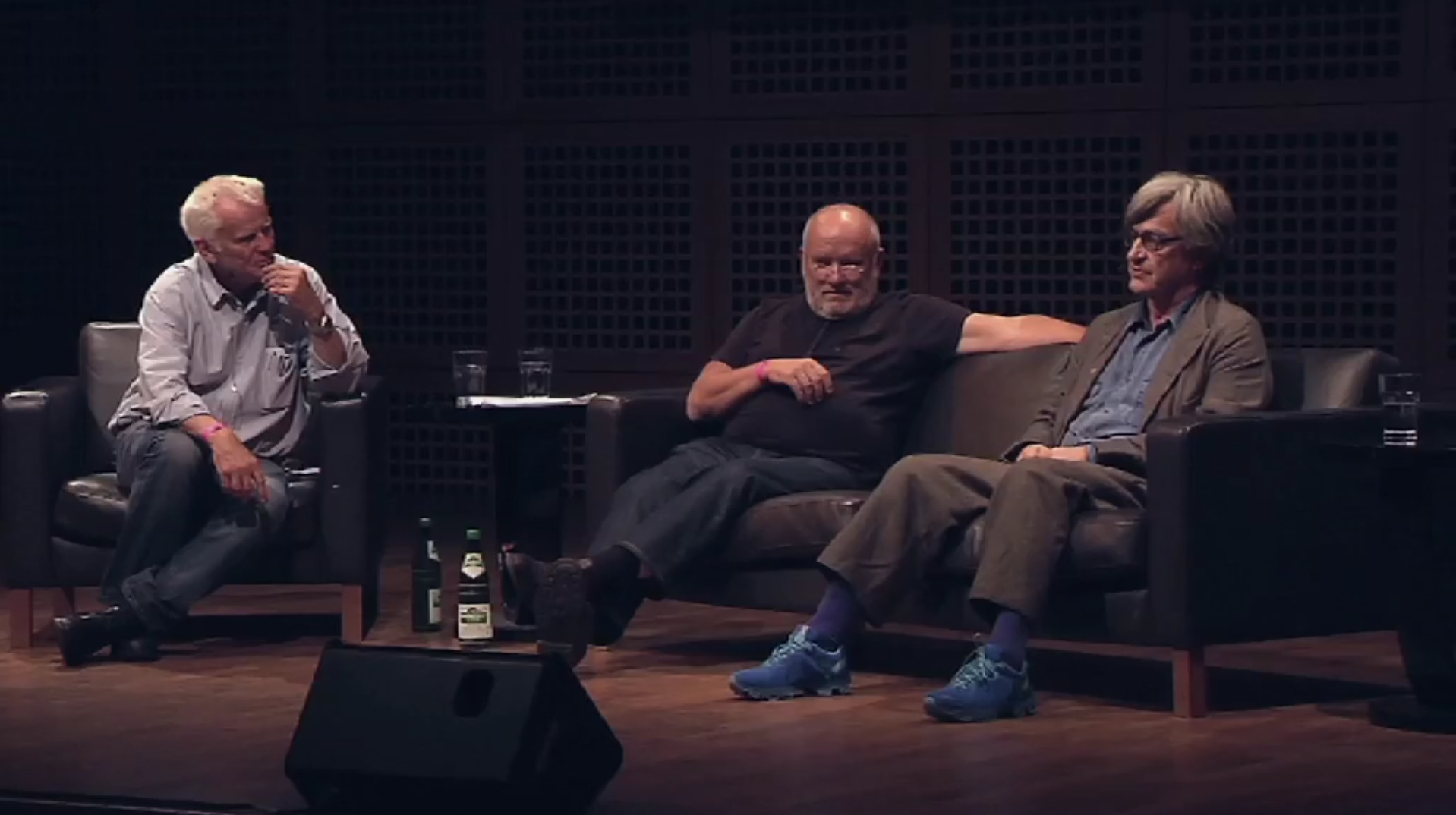
Jim Rakete, Peter Lindbergh and Wim Wenders in conversation in Düsseldorf, June 2015

Soon after the Fabrik's closure, Rakete began to almost exclusively shoot commercials and fashion spreads. In 1989, Rakete flew to Los Angeles to shoot a record video and album cover for Tangerine Dream's Melrose. A year later, Rakete eventually rented a house in Hollywood, California, splitting his working year between the West Coast, Hamburg and Berlin, shooting video clips, commercials, documentaries and fashion folders. During this period, he befriended and photographed international artists, writers, film stars and directors.

With his first 1997 exhibit in Hamburg's Galerie Barlach, Rakete's work begins to regularly appear in international galleries.

In 2001, Rakete moves back to Berlin, establishing his new working Studio in Kreuzberg. Between 2003 and 2004, he served as an advisor for the visual design of the German political magazine Cicero. Similar to The New Yorker, Cicero allowed Rakete to combine his passion for people and politics, contributing with centerfold photo essays. Rakete's first reportage for Cicero was of former German Chancellor Gerhard Schröder's trip to the White House to express his stance against the 2003 invasion of Iraq. The photographs were all black & white and primarily shot on a large plate Lintof camera. Rakete shot for Cicero for five more editions; personalities included Angela Merkel, Willy Brandt, Helmut Schmidt, Mikhail Gorbachev, Frank-Walter Steinmeier and Otto Schily.

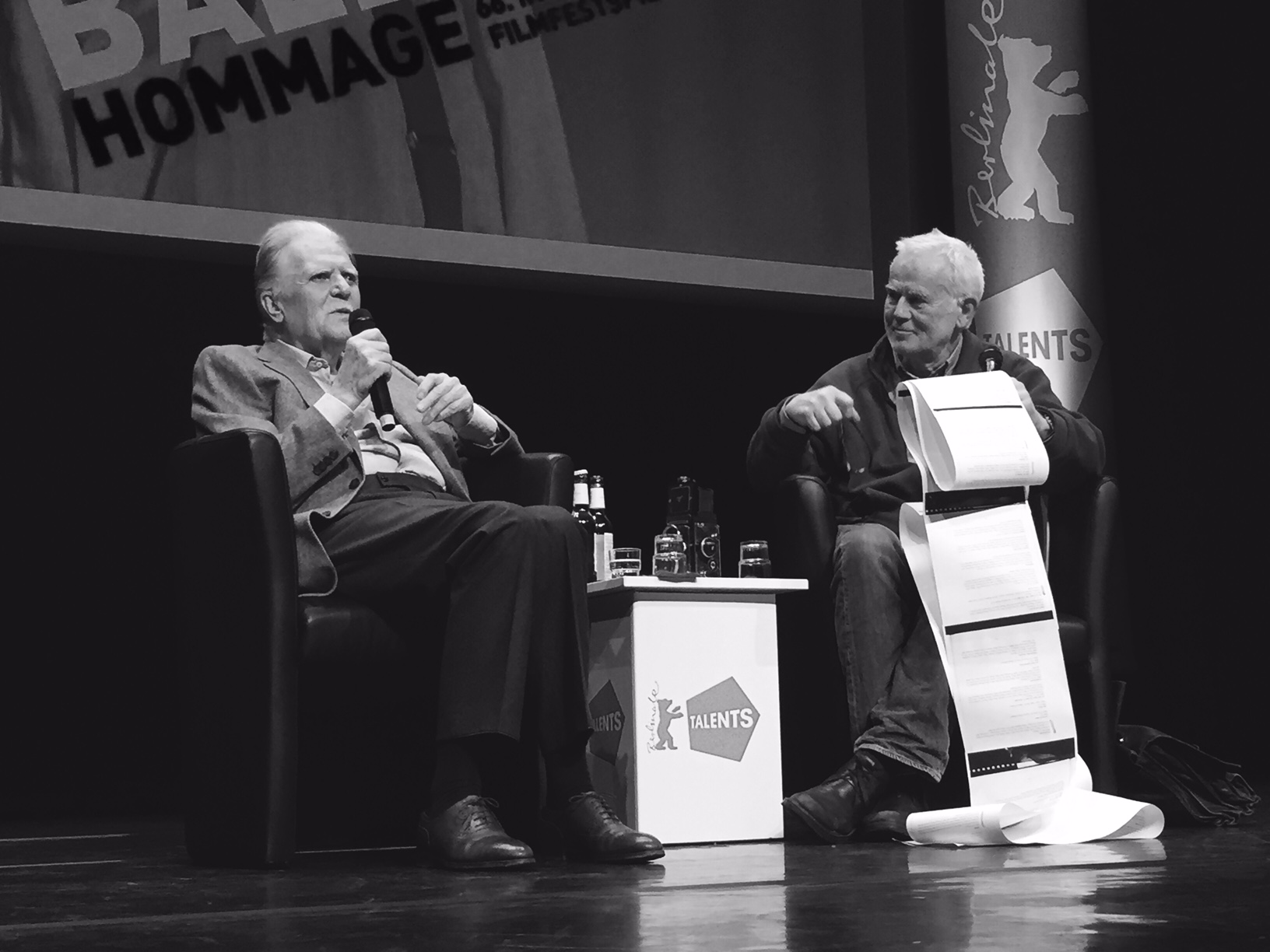
Michael Ballhaus and Jim Rakete at Berlinale Hommage 2016

In 2005, Rakete collaborated with designer Ulf Meyer zu Küindorf and curator Mark Gisbourne on the catalogue Berlin Art Now, published by Thames and Hudson. The English publication includes artists as John Bock, Tacita Dean, Jonathan Meese, Monica Bonvicini, Bernhard Martin and Yehudit Sasportas.

In 2006, as chief consultant Rakete develops the art magazine Modernica, a supplement of German newspaper Die Welt dealing with contemporary art with its main focus on photography, design and architecture.

In 2010, Rakete documented conductor Sir Simon Rattle and the Berliner Philharmoniker.

Rakete is currently continuing his activity as a photographer, producer and writer. Over the years, his work has captured social and political events, and he has most notably portrayed personalities such as: Jimi Hendrix, Ray Charles, David Bowie, Bruce Springsteen, Mick Jagger, David Byrne, Kraftwerk, Bono, Deep Purple, Joe Jackson, Sean Connery, Samuel Beckett, Bruno Ganz, Pier Paolo Pasolini, Rainer Werner Fassbinder, Ute Lemper, Martin Sheen, Claude Chabrol, Linda Evangelista, Naomi Campbell, Isabelle Huppert, John Malkovitch, John Lurie, Philip Johnson, Anthony Perkins, Sam Shepard, Willem Dafoe, Isabelle Huppert, Julie Delpy, Klaus-Maria Brandauer, Götz George, Sebastian Koch, Gérard Depardieu, Christoph Waltz, Emmanuelle Béart, Liza Minnelli, Sean Penn, Isabella Rossellini, Nina Hoss, Otto Sander, Natalie Portman, Tangerine Dream, Quentin Tarantino, Precious Wilson and Wim Wenders

== Selected exhibitions ==
- 2016: Burgtheater | Innenleben, Galerie Einstein Unter den Linden, Berlin
- 2015: Burgtheater Innenleben, Leica Galerie, Wien, Austria Burgtheater | Innenleben, Leica Galerie Salzburg auf Schloss Arenberg, Salzburg, Austria FACE & FUTURE Gelecek ve Yüzleşme, STIFTUNG MERCATOR, Essen
- 2014: IKONEN – Ein Charityprojekt von Jim Rakete und Kilian Kerner, Schneider Kreuznach, Bad Kreuznach 'Stand der Dinge - 100 Portraits für das Deutsche Filmmuseum, FO.KU.S, Innsburck, Austria FACE & FUTURE Gelecek ve Yüzleşme, ProjektZentrum Berlin der Stiftung Mercator, Berlin
- 2013: VERTIGO, MÜNZING CLAASSEN Galerie, Berlin IKONEN – Ein Charityprojekt von Jim Rakete und Kilian Kerner, MÜNZING CLAASSEN Galerie, Berlin
- 2012: STAND DER DINGE – 100 Porträts für das Deutsche Filmmuseum, Willy Brandt Haus, Berlin Rockpoeten, MÜNZING CLAASSEN Galerie, Berlin Wir & Ich (für Karuna e.V.), Museum Bensheim, Bensheim Porträtfotos der Berliner Philharmoniker, Amthof-Galerie, Bad Camberg Jim Rakete – Werkschau, Kunst- und Kulturzentrum der Städteregion Aachen, Monschau
- 2011: STAND DER DINGE – 100 Porträts für das Filmmuseum Frankfurt, Filmmuseum Frankfurt, Frankfurt
- 2010: Straßenkinder für Karuna e.V., Leica Galerie, Solms Blicke gen Norden, Patton Stiftung, Saarbrücken
- 2009: 1/8 sec. – Vertraute Fremde, Ludwig Galerie Schloß Oberhausen, Oberhausen
- 2008: Augen/Blick/Porträts, Filmmuseum, Frankfurt 1/8 sec. – Vertraute Fremde, Camera Work, Berlin
- 2006: Update, M.J. Wewerka, Galerie, Berlin Streetfootball, Künstlerhaus Bethanien, Berlin
- 2002: Bleib So, Haus der Stiftung Demokratie, Saarland
- 1999: Jim Rakete – Photographien, Suermondt-Ludwig-Museum, Aachen
- 1997: Jim Rakete – Photographien, Galerie Barlach, Hamburg
