= NunSexMonkRock =

Studio album by Nina Hagen
- Released: April 30, 1982
- Recorded: 1981–82
- Studio: Blue Rock, New York City
- Genre: Experimental rock; post-punk; new wave
- Length: 40:06
- Label: CBS
- Producer: Mike Thorne

Nina Hagen chronology
Unbehagen (1980)	NunSexMonkRock (1982)	Angstlos / Fearless (1983)

Singles from NunSexMonkRock
- 1. "Smack Jack" Released: 1982

NunSexMonkRock is the debut solo (and third overall) studio album by German singer Nina Hagen. It was released on April 30, 1982, by CBS Records.

NunSexMonkRock marked Hagen's first release since her departure from the Nina Hagen Band, and was also her first album with all songs performed in English.

== Background and recording ==
In 1979, after working on the movie Cha Cha with Herman Brood and Lene Lovich, Hagen met the Dutch guitarist Ferdinand "Ferdi" Karmelk, with whom she later had a daughter Cosma Shiva. While pregnant, Hagen started working with Karmelk on new songs in English after her departure from the Nina Hagen Band, her German ensemble. Karmelk would be credited as the sole writer of the album's lead single "Smack Jack" and as the co-writer of "Dread Love".

After her European tour was cancelled in 1980, Hagen moved to the United States and signed with CBS, with manager Bennett Glotzer, the former manager of Frank Zappa. She intended to start recording the album that year but plans fell through when Glotzer would postpone the work on the album due to her pregnancy, a move she would later criticize in interviews. "I would love to [record] when I was pregnant, it would be the holiest record in the whole wide world", she told the magazine Shades in 1982.

Hagen would later record the album in New York City with Mike Thorne and a different lineup than the one she had intended due to the album's delay. Karmelk, who was initially supposed to work on the record, doesn't feature in any of the songs.

The album takes its title from the lines "Let's do the nun sex monk rock" featured in the outro of "Dread Love", the album's fourth track.

On the album cover, Hagen is shown holding her daughter Cosma Shiva in a homage to Virgin Mary holding baby Jesus, an act that was perceived as mockery by the contemporary press, which defined Hagen as blasphemous. Hagen would later clarify her position on faith, being baptized in 2009 and pointing out Nunsexmonkrock lyrics as showing "I've always struggled and preached in the name of love, in the name of Jesus Christ and not just since my Christening."

== Composition ==
Musically, NunSexMonkRock is an experimental rock album with influences of post-punk and new wave music. The lyrics deal with various themes including motherhood, religion, drug abuse, and UFOs.

The album opens with "Antiworld" which contains an interpolation of "Third Stone from the Sun" written by Jimi Hendrix. The lyrics are a loose translation of the 1964 poem "The Antiworlds" by Andrei Voznesensky. The second track, "Smack Jack", served as the album's only single and deals with drug addiction. It was written by Karmelk, who was a heroin addict and later died of AIDS in 1988. Hagen would later write in her memoir he "loved the drug more than me and our baby." In "Taitschi-Tarot" Hagen sings about the Buddha, reincarnation, and yoga.

Hagen performed "Future Is Now" in 1979 with Kermelk on the Austrian TV show Club 2, an appearance that has become controversial due to the singer's simulation of female masturbation. "Iki Maska" contains an interpolation of "Planet Claire" performed by the B-52's and of "'O sole mio" by Bryan Adams and Luciano Pavarotti. During the last minute of the song, Nina sings lyrics from David Bowie's "Ziggy Stardust". "Cosma Shiva" is named after Hagen's daughter, who also features on the track, and contains an interpolation of "The Changeling" performed by the Doors.

Album closer "UFO" tells the tale of Hagen's own spotting of a UFO on a beach in Malibu while pregnant.

== Release ==
Nunsexmonkrock was released on April 30, 1982, on vinyl and cassette. It was re-released on CD and cassette on August 27, 1991, as the Nunsexmonkrock/Nina Hagen Band compilation including the four tracks from the Nina Hagen Band's eponymous EP, originally released in 1980. The digital version available on streaming platforms is the 1991 compilation. In 2012, the album was compiled with Nina Hagen Band and Fearless as a part of the Original Album Classics series by Columbia.

== Critical reception ==
Professional ratings
Review scores
Source	Rating
AllMusic	4.5/5 stars
Robert Christgau	C+
Europopmusic.eu	3/5 stars
Pitchfork	7.5/10

NunSexMonkRock received mixed reviews from contemporary music critics. While some praised Hagen's theatrical vocals, others criticized its experimental production. Rolling Stone called it the "most unlistenable" album ever made. Bil Carpenter at AllMusic gave it four and a half stars out of five, calling it "eccentric rock material" and praising Hagen's vocal diversity. Robert Christgau commented that "she does have a new-wave sense of humor - instead of taking on Maria Callas with her umpteen-octave range she does impressions of Linda Blair and Mercedes McCambridge."

Revisiting the album almost 40 years after its release, Evan Minsker gave it 7.5 out of ten on Pitchfork, criticizing the performances of the other band members whilst praising Hagen's delivery.

== Commercial performance ==
Commercially, the album achieved moderate success. In the United States, it peaked at number 184 on the Billboard 200. In Germany, it reached number twenty-seven and also peaked inside the top forty in other countries, such as New Zealand and Norway.

"Smack Jack" was the only single released from the album. It managed to be successful in Norway where it peaked at number seven.

== Track listing ==
No.	Title	Writer(s)	Length
1.	"Antiworld"	Nina Hagen; Paul Roessler	4:41
2.	"Smack Jack"	Ferdinand Karmelk	5:16
3.	"Taitschi-Tarot"	Hagen; Roessler	2:05
4.	"Dread Love"	Hagen; Karmelk	4:08
5.	"Future Is Now"	Hagen	2:55
6.	"Born in Xixax"	Hagen	2:55
7.	"Iki Maska"	Hagen	5:08
8.	"Dr. Art"	Hagen; Karl Rucker	4:49
9.	"Cosma Shiva"	Hagen	3:17
10.	"UFO"	Hagen; Rucker	4:52
Total length:			40:06

Nunsexmonkrock / Nina Hagen Band
No.	Title	Writer(s)	Length
11.	"TV-Glotzer (White Punks on Dope)"	Michael Evans; Hagen; Bill Spooner; Roger Steen	5:29
12.	"Superboy"	Hagen; Herwig Mitteregger	4:02
13.	"African Reggae"	Hagen; Reinhold Heil; Bernhard Potschka	4:10
14.	"Wir Leben Immer Noch (Lucky Number)"	Hagen; Lene Lovich; Les Chappell	4:54
Total length:			58:47

== Personnel ==
- Nina Hagen – vocals, synthesizer, guitar
- Allan Schwartzberg – drums
- Karl Rucker – bass, synthesizer
- Chris Spedding – guitar
- Paul Shaffer – synthesizer
- Paul Roessler – synthesizer, piano
- Axel Gath – baritone saxophone, contrabass clarinet

Technical

- Mike Thorne – production
- Michael Ewasko – engineer
- Don Wershba – additional overdubs
- Harvey Goldberg – mixing, additional overdubs
- Jack Skinner – mastering
- Nicolaj Ilieff – design
- Juliana Grigorova – photography

== Charts ==
Chart (1982)	Peak position
German Albums (Offizielle Top 100)	27
New Zealand Albums (RMNZ)	38
Norwegian Albums (VG-lista)	18
US Billboard 200	184
