= Angstlos =

Angstlos / Fearless

Studio album by Nina Hagen
- Released: August 19, 1983 / November 4, 1983
- Recorded: 1982
- Genre: Dance-pop; disco
- Length: 41:37 (US Version); 37:01 (German Version)
- Label: CBS
- Producer: Giorgio Moroder; Keith Forsey

Nina Hagen chronology
NunSexMonkRock (1982)	Angstlos / Fearless (1983)	In Ekstasy / In Ekstase (1985)

Singles from Angstlos / Fearless
- 1. "New York New York" Released: 1983; 2. "Zarah" Released: 1983; 3. "The Change" Released: 1984

Professional ratings
Review scores
Source	Rating
AllMusic	2.5/5 stars

Angstlos is the second solo (and fourth overall) studio album by German singer Nina Hagen. It was released on August 19, 1983, by CBS Records. The English version of the album entitled Fearless was released on November 4, 1983. Produced by Giorgio Moroder and Keith Forsey, the album was a major musical departure from her previous mostly new wave material. Unlike her experimental album NunSexMonkRock (1982), Fearless is a dance-pop album with influence of disco. It also incorporates other genres such as hip hop.

Upon its release, Fearless received generally mixed reviews from music critics. While some praised her new musical direction, others were critical towards her newly adopted disco sound. Commercially, the album noted a moderate success. It was Hagen's second album to chart in the United States, where it peaked at number 151 on the Billboard 200. In Germany, it reached number twenty-four and also charted in other countries, such as Austria, Netherlands, and New Zealand.

Two singles from the album were released. The lead single "New York New York" was successful in American dance charts, peaking at number nine on the Billboard Hot Dance Club Songs. "Zarah", a cover of Zarah Leander's song "Ich weiss, es wird einmal ein Wunder geschehen", was released as the album's second single. It was also successful in the United States where it peaked at number forty-five on the Dance Club Songs chart.

The album is also notable for the song "What It Is", which was written by Flea and Anthony Kiedis of the Red Hot Chili Peppers. The song was released nearly a year before the band released their 1984 debut album. The Chili Peppers also recorded a demo version of the song around the same time as Hagen recorded her version and it can be found on their 1994 Out in L.A. album.

== Track listing ==
Fearless
No.	Title	Writer(s)	Length
1.	"New York New York"	Nina Hagen; Steve Schiff; Karl Rucker	5:16
2.	"My Sensation"	Hagen; Schiff	4:04
3.	"Flying Saucers"	Hagen; Rucker	3:11
4.	"I Love Paul"	Hagen; Rucker	3:50
5.	"The Change"	Hagen; Rucker	4:40
6.	"Silent Love"	Hagen; Schiff	4:07
7.	"What It Is"	Michael Balzary; Anthony Kiedis	4:18
8.	"T.V. Snooze"	Hagen; Schiff; Michael Dorian	3:58
9.	"Springtime in Paris"	Hagen; Schiff	3:35
10.	"Zarah"	Michael Jary; Bruno Balz	4:38
Total length:			41:37

Angstlos
No.	Title	Writer(s)	Length
1.	"New York / N.Y."	Nina Hagen; Steve Schiff; Karl Rucker	4:59
2.	"Was es ist"	Hagen; Michael Balzary; Anthony Kiedis	4:19
3.	"Lorelei"	Hagen; Rucker; Juliana Grigorova	2:35
4.	"Zarah (Ich weiss, es wird einmal ein Wunder geschehen)"	Michael Jary; Bruno Balz; Hagen	5:02
5.	"Frühling in Paris"	Hagen; Schiff	3:35
6.	"I Love Paul"	Hagen; Rucker	3:50
7.	"My Sensation"	Hagen; Schiff	4:03
8.	"Newsflash"	Hagen; Schiff; Michael Dorian	3:58
9.	"The Change"	Hagen; Rucker	4:40
Total length:			37:01

== Personnel ==
- Nina Hagen – vocals
- Giorgio Moroder – production
- Keith Forsey – production
- Karl Rucker – bass, keyboards, arrangements
- Steve Schiff – guitar, keyboards, arrangements
- Richie Zito – guitar
- Arthur Barrow – keyboards
- John Philip Shenale – keyboards
- Gary Herbig – horns
- Carmen Twillie – backing vocals
- Clydene Jackson – backing vocals
- Julia Waters – backing vocals
- Maxine Waters – backing vocals
- John Gilston – Simmons drum programming
- Vlado Meller – mastering
- Brian Reeves – engineer
- David Concors – engineer
- Richard McKernan – engineer
- Glenn Feit – engineer
- Marva Marrow – photography
- Juliana Grigorova – photography

== Charts ==
Chart (1984)	Peak position
Austrian Albums (Ö3 Austria)	11
Canada Top Albums/CDs (RPM)	68
German Albums (Offizielle Top 100)	24
Dutch Albums (Album Top 100)	40
New Zealand Albums (RMNZ)	47
US Billboard 200	151
US Cashbox Top 200	163
