= Interzone =

Interzone may refer to:

== General ==
- International zone, such as in Tangier
- Interzone (book), the title of a short story collection by William Burroughs
- Interzone, a setting in the 1959 novel Naked Lunch by William Burroughs
- Interzone (magazine), a British science fiction magazine

== Music ==
- Interzone (band), a German blues/rock band
- "Interzone", a track on the Joy Division album Unknown Pleasures
- "Interzone", the first track on the album The Interzone Mantras by The Tea Party
- Interzone (album), an album by John Zorn

== Cinema ==
- Interzone (film), a 1987 film directed by Deran Sarafian
