= Niederrhein =

Niederrhein may refer to:

- Lower Rhine, the northernmost German section of the river Rhine
- Lower Rhine region, a region around the Lower Rhine section of the river Rhine in North Rhine-Westphalia, Germany
- Niederrhein Airport or Weeze Airport, airport near Weeze in the Lower Rhine region of Germany
- "Niederrhein", a 1990 song by Austrian musician Herwig Mitteregger
- Hochschule Niederrhein, a german University of Applied Sciences
