= TV-Glotzer =

Single by Nina Hagen Band

from the album Nina Hagen Band
- B-side: "Heiss"
- Released: 1978 (Germany); 29 August 1979 (UK)
- Recorded: 1977; Hansa Tonstudio, Berlin
- Genre: Rock; post-punk; new wave
- Length: 5:15
- Label: CBS
- Songwriters: Nina Hagen; Michael Evans; Bill Spooner; Roger Steen
- Producers: Nina Hagen Band; Tom Müller

Nina Hagen Band singles chronology
"TV-Glotzer" (1978)	"Naturträne" (1978)

Nina Hagen singles chronology
"Hey, wir fahren auf's Land" (1976)	"TV-Glotzer" (1978)	"Naturträne" (1978)

"TV-Glotzer" is a song by Nina Hagen Band, first released in 1978 by CBS Records and later, on 24 August 1979, released in United Kingdom. The song is a cover of "White Punks on Dope" by The Tubes, with different German lyrics from the perspective of an East German unable to leave her country, who escapes by watching West German television, where "everything is so colourful". Hagen wrote the song before being expatriated from East Germany in 1976, following her stepfather Wolf Biermann. Later, when she formed the Nina Hagen Band in the West Berlin, they recorded the song, and it became the lead single from their debut album Nina Hagen Band (1978).

== Track listings ==
- 7" single (Germany)
1. "TV-Glotzer (White Punks on Dope)" – 5:15
2. "Heiss" – 4:11
- 7" single (UK)
1. "TV-Glotzer (White Punks on Dope)" – 5:15
2. "Naturträne" – 4:05

== Credits and personnel ==
- Nina Hagen – vocals, songwriter
- Reinhold Heil – keyboards
- Herwig Mitteregger – drums
- Bernhard Potschka – guitar
- Manfred Praeker – bass
- Tom Müller – producer, engineer
