= 14 Friendly Abductions =

Compilation album by Nina Hagen
- Released: April 2, 1996
- Label: Sony BMG
- Producer: Giorgio Moroder, Keith Forsey, Adam Kidron, Mike Thorne

Nina Hagen chronology
Definitive Collection (1995)	14 Friendly Abductions (1996)	Prima Nina in Ekstasy (2000)

14 Friendly Abductions is a "best of" compilation album by Nina Hagen, released in 1996. AllMusic rated it 4 1/2 out of 5.

== Track listing ==
1. "Zarah"
2. "New York New York"
3. "Smack Jack"
4. "TV-Glotzer (White Punks On Dope)"
5. "Spirit In The Sky"
6. "African Reggae"
7. "Universal Radio" (Universal Dance Mix)
8. "My Sensation"
9. "Iki Maska"
10. "Wir Leben Immer Noch (Lucky Number)"
11. "Cosma Shiva"
12. "Zarah" (Dance Mix)
13. "Zarah" (Dub)
14. "My Way"
