= Ich weiss, es wird einmal ein Wunder geschehen =

"Ich weiß, es wird einmal ein Wunder gescheh’n"

Song by Zarah Leander
- Length: 3:15
- Label: Odeon Records
- Songwriters: Bruno Balz, Michael Jary

"Zarah"

Single by Nina Hagen

from the album Angstlos
- Released: 1983
- Length: 5:02
- Label: CBS
- Songwriters: Bruno Balz, Michael Jary
- Producers: Giorgio Moroder, Keith Forsey

Nina Hagen singles chronology
"New York / N.Y." (1983)	"Zarah" (1983)	"The Change" (1984)

"Ich weiß, es wird einmal ein Wunder gescheh’n" ("I Know Some Day a Miracle Will Happen") is a song composed by Bruno Balz and Michael Jary, which was originally recorded by Swedish actress and singer Zarah Leander. It first appeared in the 1942 film Die große Liebe.

== Nina Hagen cover ==
German recording artist Nina Hagen covered the song and titled it as "Zarah" or "Zarah (Ich weiß, es wird einmal ein Wunder geschehn)" for her album Angstlos. It was released as the album's second single in 1983. The song was later included on Hagen's compilation albums 14 Friendly Abductions, Prima Nina in Ekstasy and The Very Best of Nina Hagen.

=== Track listing ===
1. "Zarah (Ich weiß, es wird einmal ein Wunder geschehn)" - 5:02
2. "Frühling In Paris" - 3:35

=== Charts ===
Chart (1984)	Peak Position
US Dance Club Songs (Billboard)	45
