= Nina Hagen Band – EP =

Nina Hagen Band - EP

EP by Nina Hagen
- Released: 1980
- Genre: Punk rock
- Label: CBS

Nina Hagen Band EP is a compilation of tracks by the Nina Hagen Band. The tracks are taken from the Nina Hagen Band and Unbehagen albums.

== Track listing ==
1. "TV-Glotzer (White Punks on Dope)" - 5:29
2. "Superboy" - 4:02
3. "African Reggae" - 4:10
4. "Wir Leben Immer...Noch (Lucky Number)" - 4:54
