= The Great Love (1942 film) =

- Directed by: Rolf Hansen
- Written by: Peter Groll; Rolf Hansen; Alexander Lernet-Holenia
- Produced by: Walter Bolz
- Starring: Zarah Leander; Viktor Staal; Grethe Weiser
- Cinematography: Franz Weihmayr; Gerhard Huttula (special effects)
- Edited by: Anna Höllering
- Music by: Michael Jary
- Production company: UFA
- Distributed by: Deutsche Filmvertriebs
- Release date: 12 June 1942
- Running time: 100 minutes
- Country: Germany
- Language: German
- Budget: 3 million RM (equivalent to 13 million 2021 euros)
- Box office: 8 million RM (equivalent to 34 million 2021 euros)

The Great Love (German: Die große Liebe) is a 1942 German drama film directed by Rolf Hansen and starring Zarah Leander, Viktor Staal and Grethe Weiser. It premiered in Berlin in 1942 and went on to become the most commercially successful film in the history of the Third Reich. It was shot at the Tempelhof Studios with location shooting taking place in Berlin, Rome and Vienna. The film's sets were designed by the art director Walter Haag.

== Story ==
The attractive Oberleutnant Paul Wendlandt is stationed in North Africa as a Luftwaffe fighter pilot. While in Berlin to deliver a report he is given a day's leave, and on the stage of the cabaret theatre "Skala" sees the popular Danish singer Hanna Holberg. For Paul it is love at first sight. When Hanna visits friends after the end of the performance, he follows her, and speaks to her in the U-Bahn. After the party in her friends' flat he accompanies her home, and chance throws them further together when an air raid warning forces them to take cover in the air raid shelter. Hanna reciprocates Paul's feelings, but after a night spent together Paul has to return immediately to the front.

There now follows a whole series of misunderstandings, and one missed opportunity after another. While Hanna waits in vain for some sign of life from Paul, he is flying on missions in North Africa. When he tries to visit her in her Berlin flat, she is giving a Christmas concert in Paris. Nevertheless, their bond grows in strength and arouses the jealousy of the composer Rudnitzky, who is also in love with the singer. Paul asks Hanna in a letter to marry him. However, when he is finally able to visit her, he is called away again on the night before the wedding. Hanna, disappointed, leaves for Rome, where she has to make a guest appearance. Even when Paul manages to get three weeks' leave and follows Hanna to Rome, the wedding has still to be postponed: Paul feels so strongly that he is needed at the front that he goes back even though he has not been ordered to do so. Hanna does not understand this, and there is an argument, after which Paul thinks he has lost her forever.

Germany invades the Soviet Union and Paul and his friend Etzdorf are sent to the Eastern Front. When Etzdorf is killed, Paul writes a farewell letter to Hanna, to make the dangers of his missions easier to bear. Only when he himself has been shot down and wounded and is sent to a military hospital in the mountains does he see Hanna again, who is still prepared to marry him. The last shots of the film show the happy couple, confident in the future, looking skywards where squadrons of German bombers fly past.

== Musical numbers ==
- Davon geht die Welt nicht unter ("It's Not the End of the World")
- Blaue Husaren (Heut' kommen die blauen Husaren) ("Today the Blue Hussars Are Coming")
- Ich weiss, es wird einmal ein Wunder geschehen ("I Know a Miracle Will Happen")
- Mein Leben für die Liebe - Jawohl! ("My Life for Love - Jawohl!")

All the songs were composed by Michael Jary, with lyrics by Bruno Balz and sung by Zarah Leander. "Davon geht die Welt nicht unter" and "Ich weiß, es wird einmal ein Wunder gescheh'n" were two of the biggest hits of the National Socialist period, and because of their political subtexts were much approved of and promoted by the authorities. After 1942, as the military situation became more and more unfavourable to Germany, they became a staple element of the prevalent informal propaganda geared to "seeing it through". Nowadays, "Ich weiss, es wird einmal ein Wunder geschehen" and "Davon geht die Welt nicht unter" are idioms in German language.

== Cast ==
- Zarah Leander as Hanna Holberg
- Viktor Staal as Paul Wendlandt
- Grethe Weiser as Käthe, Hanna's dresser
- Paul Hörbiger as Alexander Rudnitzky, composer
- Wolfgang Preiss as Oberleutnant von Etzdorf
- Hans Schwarz jr. as Alfred Vanloo, artist
- Leopold von Ledebur as Herr von Westphal
- Julia Serda as Jenny von Westphal
- Victor Janson as Mocelli, theatre director
- Agnes Windeck as Hann's mother
- Paul Bildt as Head waiter
- Erich Dunskus as man with dog
- Olga Engl as old lady in block of flats
- Karl Etlinger as man with admission tickets
- Ilse Fürstenberg as air raid shelter attendant
- Grete Reinwald as mother in air raid shelter
- Ewald Wenck as Berlin taxi driver
- Just Scheu as Alfred Vanloo's brother
- Erna Sellmer as ticket collector

== National Socialist propaganda ==
In its blend of entertainment and propaganda elements the film is paradigmatic for National Socialist cinema in much the same way as Wunschkonzert, after Die große Liebe the next most popular film of the National Socialist period. While on the one hand the suspensefully presented love story, with its images of the North African desert, Paris and Rome, as well as the extravagant show numbers, constitutes an invitation to dream, yet on the other hand "Die große Liebe" urges adjustment to the realities of war at all levels. Not love, but war, is the real theme of the film. This is despite omitting any background for, or events in, the war.

The film does not just contain original material from the "Die Deutsche Wochenschau" with pictures of German attacks on the English channel coast: the war determines the whole action of the film. The lesson that Hanna Holberg, and with her the entire public, has to absorb, is the insignificance of individual striving for happiness in times in which higher values - here, the military victory of Germany in World War II - come to the fore. The film does not gain its political impact by simply urging renunciation or "going without" in difficult times, but by setting off individual happiness against duties which go far beyond the requirements of ordinary military duties. Paul is not concerned about behaving with military correctness, but about his desire to make his contribution to Germany's military victory. He renounces Hanna, not because of military orders recalling him to the front but in order to serve the national cause and if necessary to sacrifice his life for Germany. In the process Hanna learns that waiting and renunciation in war have not only to be accepted as fate, but constitute the really "great love". She learns to bravely send him back to his squadron, singing, "The World's Not Going To End Because of This."

The film owes by far the greatest part of its attractiveness to Zarah Leander's performance. When she was selected for the role she had already established a strong profile as an expressive portrayer of self-aware, mature, emotionally stable women, whose plans and lives were thrown into disarray by unexpected blows of fate. The director Rolf Hansen, working with her here for the second time, had the good idea of teaming her up with a weak and relatively insignificant male lead, who was scarcely capable of playing against the weight of her presence. The suffering laid upon Hanna Holberg by her unfulfilled love gained by the fact that she was profoundly misunderstood, an important additional element that deeply impressed the public.

In order to impress also by its modernity, the film took the risk of making - for the time - an unprecedentedly realistic representation of day-to-day wartime life, and shows rationing of food, air raid warnings and hours spent waiting in air raid shelters. Admittedly it never shows these things without taking care always to point out how to maintain at all times care for others and good humour, however difficult the circumstances. All levels of society are depicted as pitching in together, with the heroine coming to know those of much lower social level in the course of the film. Hanna learns thereby to overcome her snobbishness, manifested in her singing for wounded soldiers.

The depiction of Zarah Leander was also unusual, in that in this film she wore ordinary day clothes, lived in a normal Berlin rented flat and even travelled on the U-Bahn.

== Production and reception ==
The interior scenes for "Die große Liebe" were filmed from 23 September 1941 to early October 1941 in the Tobis-Sascha-Studio in Vienna - better known as the Rosenhügel Film Studios - and in the Carl Froelich sound studio in Berlin-Tempelhof. The exterior scenes had been filmed in Berlin and Rome by the middle of March 1942. The film was submitted to the Film Censor's Office on 10 June 1942 (Prüf-Nr. B. 57295) when it had a length of 2,738 metres or 100 minutes and was classified as suitable for minors and for public holiday viewing. It was distributed by the UFA-owned Deutsche Filmvertriebs GmbH (DFV). On 18 April 1944 it was re-submitted, now with a length of 2,732 metres (B. 60163), and was re-classified as before.

The premiere took place on 12 June 1942 in Berlin, in the Germania-Palast cinema on the Frankfurter Allee and the UFA-Palast am Zoo cinema. Die große Liebe became the greatest commercial film success of the Third Reich. It was seen by 27 million spectators and took 8 million Reichsmarks, having cost 3 million to produce (equivalent to 34 and 13 million 2021 euros). The Film Censor's Office pronounced it "politically valuable", '"artistically valuable" and "valuable for the people" - a combination of accolades also granted, for example, to Gerhard Lamprecht's nationalist hero biography "Diesel" (also 1942).

After the end of World War II the Allied Control Commission forbade the film to be screened. In 1963 however it was submitted to the FSK, who approved its re-release subject to cuts, which were however disregarded by the distributors: the film was shown with a preliminary warning but with no cuts. Further cuts were made in 1980 for release on home video, approved by the FSK for audiences age 6 and up.

The original version of "Die große Liebe" was submitted to the FSK in 1997 and approved for release to audiences over the age of 18. This completely uncut version, running 100 minutes (approximately 97 mins in the PAL video format) is commercially available as a video and DVD in Germany. Distribution rights are now the property of Transit-Film GmbH.

== Sources and external links ==
- The Great Love at IMDb
- Die große Liebe at filmportal.de/en
- (in German) www.gwick.ch
- (in German) www.uni-konstanz.de Axel Jockwer: Die große Liebe (lecture)
- (in German) www.murnau-stiftung.de
- (in German)
- (in German) www.lernet-holenia.com
- (in German) www.filmarchiv.at
- (in German) www.return2style.de
- (in German) www.film-zeit.de
