= New York / N.Y. =

Single by Nina Hagen

from the album Angstlos
- Released: 1983
- Genre: Dance-punk, hip hop
- Length: 3:36
- Label: CBS
- Songwriters: Nina Hagen, Karl Rucker, Steve Schiff

Nina Hagen singles chronology
"Smack Jack" (1982)	"New York / N.Y." (1983)	"Zarah" (1983)

"New York / N.Y." is a song by German artist Nina Hagen from her album Angstlos. Co-written by Hagen, Karl Rucker and Steve Schiff, it was released as the record's lead single in 1983. The song was later included on Hagen's compilation albums 14 Friendly Abductions, Definitive Collection, Prima Nina in Ekstasy and The Very Best of Nina Hagen. Nina Hagen raps in the English and the German version of the song. Only the refrain "New York, New York", which is repeated several times, is sung.

== Track listing ==
1. "New York / N.Y." – 3:36
2. "Was es ist" – 4:19

== In popular culture ==
In 2003, the song was featured in the American biographical comedy-drama film Party Monster.

Canadian electronic musician and performance artist Peaches references and sings a snippet of the song in the music video for her song "Show Stopper", which features Danish film actress Charlotte Munck.

== Charts ==
Chart (1984)	Peak Position
US Dance Club Songs (Billboard)	9
