= Nina Hagen Band (album) =

Studio album by Nina Hagen Band
- Released: August 31, 1978 (West Berlin); September 1978 (Germany)
- Recorded: 1978
- Studio: Hansa Tonstudio, Berlin
- Genre: Rock; Neue Deutsche Welle; new wave
- Length: 42:00
- Label: CBS
- Producer: Nina Hagen Band; Tom Müller; Ralf Nowy

Nina Hagen Band chronology
Nina Hagen Band (1978)	Unbehagen (1980)

Singles from Nina Hagen Band
- 1. "TV-Glotzer" Released: 1978; 2. "Naturträne" Released: 1978; 3. "Auf'm Bahnhof Zoo" Released: 1978; 4. "Unbeschreiblich weiblich" Released: 1979

Professional ratings
Review scores
Source	Rating
AllMusic	2/5 stars
Europopmusic.eu	5/5 stars
Smash Hits	8/10

Nina Hagen Band is the debut studio album by Nina Hagen Band. It first was released only in West Berlin on August 31, 1978 by CBS Records. The following month it was released in the rest of Germany. The album first entered the Official Albums Chart in Germany on 20 November 1978. It was the first release by German singer Nina Hagen after her 1976 expatriation from East Germany. When she arrived in Hamburg, her stepfather and singer-songwriter Wolf Biermann got her in touch with CBS. Hagen traveled to London where she was introduced to music genres such as punk and reggae, and befriended other artists including Ari Up of the band The Slits. After she returned to Germany, she met with musicians Herwig Mitteregger, Bernhard Potschka and Manfred Praeker. Joined by Reinhold Heil, they formed the Nina Hagen Band and in November 1977 signed a record deal with CBS. Nina Hagen Band was produced by the band with additional production by Tom Müller and Ralf Nowy. Most of the songs had been already written by Hagen in East Germany.

Upon its release, Nina Hagen Band received positive reviews from music critics, who praised Hagen's theatrical vocals, different from singing on her East German records. The album was a commercial success. In Germany, it peaked at number eleven and also reached charts in other countries, such as Austria and Netherlands. Nina Hagen Band was certified gold by Bundesverband Musikindustrie (BVMI) and has sold over 250,000 copies.

Four singles were released from the album: "TV-Glotzer", "Auf'm Bahnhof Zoo", "Naturträne" and "Unbeschreiblich weiblich". The album was promoted by a European tour. As a part of the promotion, Nina Hagen Band performed in Dortmund's Westfalenhalle in December 1978. The show was broadcast live by the music television show Rockpalast.

== Background ==
After Hagen's stepfather Wolf Biermann was expatriated from East Germany in 1976, she first stood up for his re-entry, but after her request was denied, she followed him to Hamburg. In January 1977, he got her in touch with CBS Records. Hagen was invited to London by Juliana Grigorova, who cast her in the movie The Go-Blue Girl. Grigorova would later work with Hagen as a photographer. She shot the covers of her solo albums NunSexMonkRock (1982), Fearless (1983) and Nina Hagen in Ekstasy (1985). Hagen discovered new styles of music during her stay in London and got inspired mainly by punk. She met with Ari Up, the lead singer of the band The Slits and together they wrote the song "Pank", which later appeared on the album.

Inspired by the London music scene, Hagen returned to Berlin and met with the members of the band Lokomotive Kreuzberg, Manfred Praeker, Herwig Mitteregger and Bernhard Potschka. The three musicians were afterwards joined by Reinhold Heil and along with Hagen they created the Nina Hagen Band. In November 1977, the band signed a contract with CBS Records under the management of Jim Rakete.

== Track listing ==
No.	Title	Writer(s)	Length
1.	"TV-Glotzer (White Punks on Dope)"	Nina Hagen; Michael Evans; Bill Spooner; Roger Steen	5:15
2.	"Rangehn"	Hagen; Bernhard Potschka	3:27
3.	"Unbeschreiblich weiblich"	Hagen; Manfred Praeker	3:30
4.	"Auf'm Bahnhof Zoo"	Hagen; Praeker; Reinhold Heil	5:25
5.	"Naturträne"	Hagen	4:05
6.	"Superboy"	Hagen; Herwig Mitteregger	4:01
7.	"Heiss"	Hagen; Heil; Mitteregger; Potschka; Praeker	4:11
8.	"Fisch im Wasser"	Hagen	0:51
9.	"Auf'm Friedhof"	Hagen; Mitteregger; Potschka	6:15
10.	"Der Spinner"	Hagen; Mitteregger	3:15
11.	"Pank"	Hagen; Arianne Forster	1:45
Total length:			42:00

== Personnel ==
Nina Hagen Band

- Nina Hagen – vocals
- Reinhold Heil – keyboards
- Herwig Mitteregger – drums, vibraphone
- Bernhard Potschka – guitar, vocals
- Manfred Praeker – bass, vocals

Technical

- Tom Müller – producer, engineer
- Ralph Nowy – co-producer, engineer
- Michael Zimmerling – technician
- Friedhelm Meinass – design
- Jim Rakete – photography

== Charts ==
=== Weekly charts ===
Chart (1978–1979)	Peak position
Austrian Albums (Ö3 Austria)	24
Dutch Albums (Album Top 100)	7
German Albums (Offizielle Top 100)	11

=== Year-end charts ===
Chart (1979)	Position
German Albums (Offizielle Top 100)	19

== Certifications and sales ==
Region	Certification	Certified units/sales
Netherlands (NVPI)	Gold	50,000^{^}
Germany (BVMI)	Gold	250,000^{^}
^{^} Shipments figures based on certification alone.
