= Zarah Leander =

Swedish actress and singer (1907–1981)

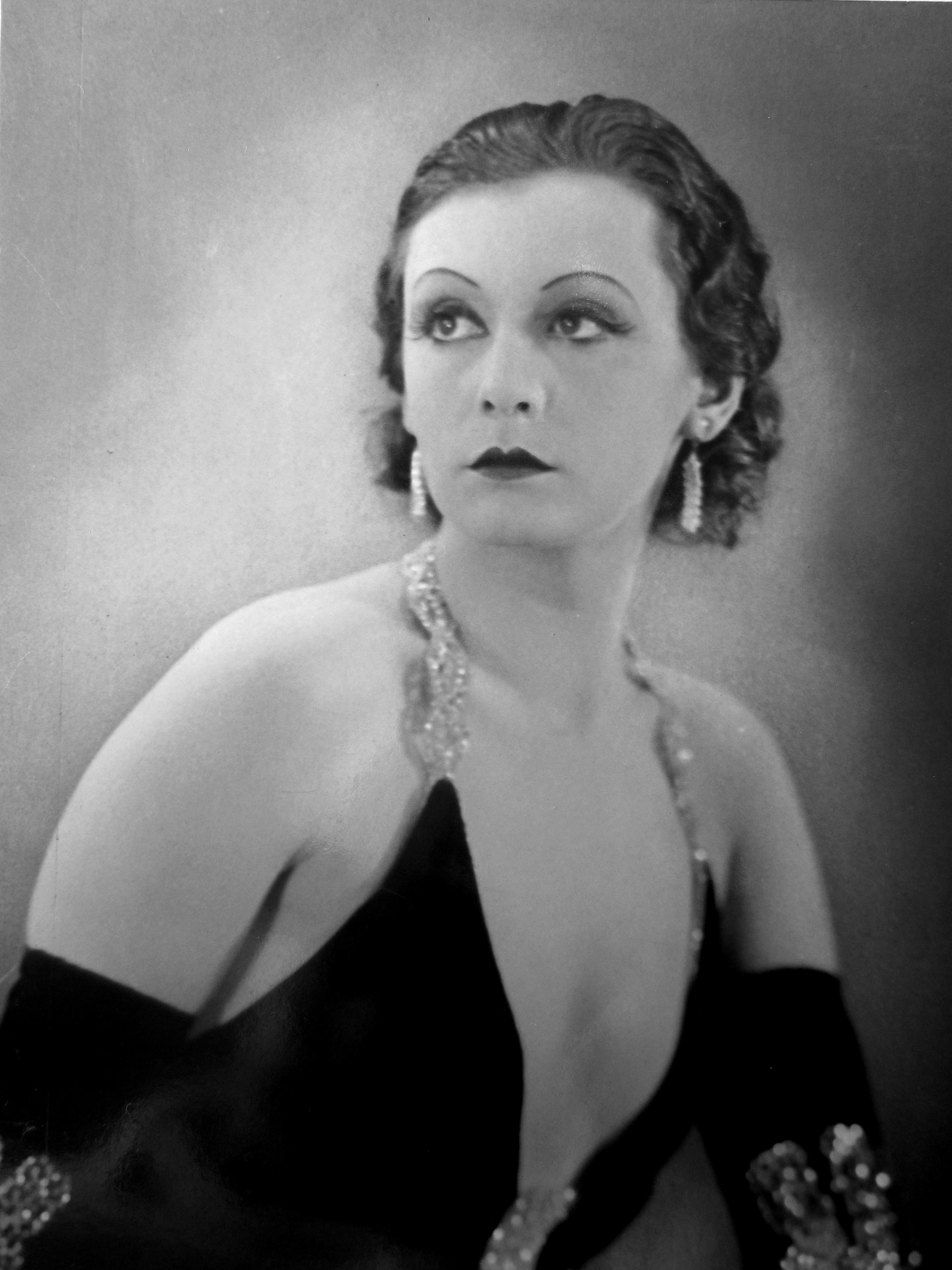
- Leander in 1931
- Born: Sara Stina Hedberg; 15 March 1907; Karlstad, Sweden
- Died: 23 June 1981 (aged 74); Stockholm, Sweden
- Occupations: Actress, singer
- Years active: 1929–1979
- Spouses: Nils Leander (1926–1930); Vidar Forsell (1932–1943); Arne Hülphers (1956–1978)
- Children: 2

Zarah Leander (German pronunciation: [ˈt͡sa.ʁa leː.ˈʔan.dɐ]; 15 March 1907 – 23 June 1981) was a Swedish singer and actress whose greatest success was in Nazi Germany between 1936 and 1943, when she was contracted to work for the state-owned Universum Film AG (UFA). Although no exact record sales numbers exist, she was probably among Europe's best-selling recording artists in the years prior to 1945. Her involvement with UFA caused some of her films and lyrics to be identified as Nazi propaganda. Though she had taken no public political position, she remained a controversial figure for the rest of her life. As a singer, Leander was known for her confident style and her deep contralto voice, and was also known as a "female baritone".

== Early career ==
She was born as Sara Stina Hedberg in Karlstad, studying piano and violin as a child, and sang on stage for the first time at the age of six. She initially had no intention of becoming a professional performer and led an ordinary life for several years. As a teenager she lived two years in Riga, Latvia (1922–1924), where she learned German, took up work as a secretary, married Nils Leander (1926), and had two children (1927 and 1929). However, in 1929 she was engaged, as an amateur, in a touring cabaret by the entertainer and producer Ernst Rolf and for the first time sang "Vill ni se en stjärna" ("Do You Want to See a Star?"), which soon would become her signature tune.

In 1930, she participated in four cabarets in the capital, Stockholm, made her first records, including a cover of Marlene Dietrich's "Falling in Love Again", and played a part in a film. However, it was as "Hanna Glavari" in Franz Lehár's operetta The Merry Widow that she had her definitive break-through (1931). By then she had divorced Nils Leander. In the following years, she expanded upon her career and made a living as an artist on stage and in film in Scandinavia. Her fame brought her proposals from the European continent and from Hollywood, where a number of Swedish actors and directors were working.

In the beginning of the 1930s she performed with the Swedish revue artist, producer, and songwriter Karl Gerhard who was a prominent anti-Nazi. He wrote a song for Zarah Leander, "I skuggan av en stövel" ("In the shadow of a boot"), in 1934 which strongly condemned the persecution of Jews in Nazi Germany.

Leander opted for an international career on the European continent. As a mother of two school-age children, she ruled out a move to America, fearing the consequences of taking the children such a great distance and being unable to find employment. Despite the political situation, Austria and Germany were much closer to home, and Leander was already well-versed in German.

A second breakthrough, by contemporary measures her international debut, was the world premiere (1936) of Axel an der Himmelstür (Axel at the Gate of Heaven) at the Theater an der Wien in Vienna, directed by Max Hansen. It was a parody of Hollywood and not the least a parody of Marlene Dietrich. It was followed by the Austrian film Premiere, in which she played a successful cabaret star.

== UFA star ==
In 1936, she was introduced to UFA Studio Head Ernst Correll by director Detlef Sierck (later known as Douglas Sirk) and landed a contract with UFA in Berlin. She became renowned as a very tough negotiator, demanding both influence and a high salary, half of which was to be paid in Swedish kronor to a bank in Stockholm. As a leading film star at UFA, she participated in ten films, most of them great successes. Involvement with the Nazi propaganda machine did not prevent her from recording in 1938 the Yiddish song "Bei Mir Bistu Shein". Many of her songs were composed by Michael Jary, with whom she had an affair, and Bruno Balz with music and lyrics, respectively. In her films, Leander repeatedly played independent, beautiful, passionate and self-confident women. Leander scored the two biggest hits of her recording career—in her signature deep voice, she sang her anthems of hope and survival: "Davon geht die Welt nicht unter" ("This is not the end of the world") and "Ich weiss, es wird einmal ein Wunder geschehen" ("I know that someday a miracle will happen"). These two songs in particular are often included in contemporary documentaries as obvious examples of effective Nazi propaganda. Although no exact record sales numbers exist, it is likely that she was among Europe's best-selling recording artists in the years prior to 1945. She pointed out in later years that what made her a fortune was not her salary from UFA, but the royalties from the records she released.

== Return to Sweden ==
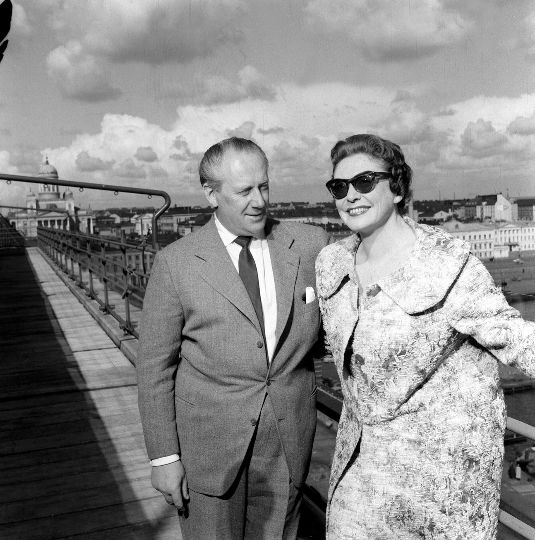
Arne Hülphers and Zarah Leander visiting Helsinki in 1957

Her last film in Nazi Germany premiered on 3 March 1943. Her villa in Grunewald was hit in an air raid, and the increasingly desperate Nazis pressured her to apply for German citizenship. At this point she decided to retreat to Sweden, where she had bought a mansion at Lönö, not far from Stockholm. She was still contractually obligated for another film to UFA, but held up the film representatives by rejecting script after script.

Gradually she managed to land engagements on the Swedish stage. After the war she did eventually return to tour Germany and Austria, giving concerts, making new records and acting in musicals. Her comeback found an eager audience among pre-war generations who had never forgotten her. She appeared in a number of films and television shows, but she would never regain the popularity she had enjoyed before and into the first years of World War II. In 1981, after having retired from show business, she died in Stockholm of complications from a stroke.

== Controversy ==
Leander was often questioned about her years in Nazi Germany. Though she would willingly talk about her past, she strongly rejected allegations of her having had sympathy for the Nazi regime. She claimed that her position as a German film actress merely had been that of an entertainer working to please an enthusiastic audience in a difficult time.

On the other hand, in an interview recorded shortly before his death in 1996 the senior Soviet intelligence officer Pavel Sudoplatov claimed that Leander had in fact been a Soviet agent with the codename "Stina-Rose". Recruited by the Soviet Union before the outbreak of war, she was said to have refused payment for her work because she was a secret member of the Swedish Communist Party and therefore conducted the work for political reasons. Leander herself denied any suggestion that she had acted as a spy for any country.

== Legacy ==
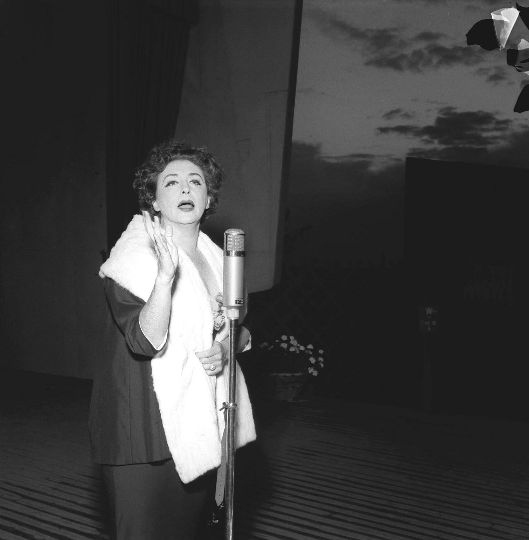
Leander performing in Helsinki, Finland in 1955

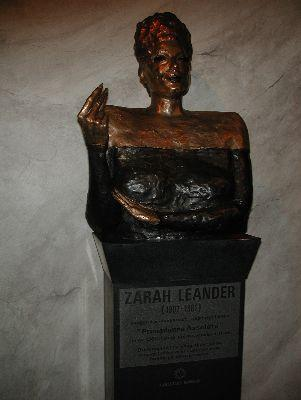
Bronze statue of Zarah Leander – Karlstads Operahouse

Leander continued to be popular in Germany for many decades after World War II. She was interviewed several times on German television before her death. In 1983, New Wave singer Nina Hagen, who had idolized Leander as a child, released the single "Zarah", based on „Ich weiss, es wird einmal ein Wunder geschehen”. In 1987, two Swedish musicals were written about Zarah Leander. In 2003, a bronze statue was placed in Zarah Leander's home town Karlstad, by the Opera house of Värmland where she first began her career. After many years of discussions, the town government accepted this statue on behalf of the local Zarah Leander Society. A Zarah Leander museum is open near her mansion outside Norrköping. Every year a scholarship is given to a creative artist in her tradition. The performer Mattias Enn received the prize in 2010, the female impersonator Jörgen Mulligan in 2009, and Zarah's friend and creator of the museum Brigitte Pettersson in 2008.

== Filmography ==
- Dante's Mysteries (1931), with Eric Abrahamson, Elisabeth Frisk, Gustaf Lövås
- The False Millionaire (1931), with Sture Lagerwall, Fridolf Rhudin
- The Marriage Game (1935), with Einar Axelsson, Karl Gerhard, Elsa Carlsson
- Premiere (1937, her first film in German), with Karl Martell, Attila Hörbiger, Theo Lingen
- To New Shores (1937), with Willy Birgel, Viktor Staal, Carola Höhn, Erich Ziegel, Hilde von Stolz
- La Habanera (1937), with Ferdinand Marian, Karl Martell, Paul Bildt, Edwin Juergenssen, Werner Finck
- Heimat (1938), with Heinrich George, Ruth Hellberg, Lina Carstens, Paul Hörbiger, Leo Slezak
- The Blue Fox (1938), with Willy Birgel, Paul Hörbiger, Jane Tilden, Karl Schönböck, Rudolf Platte
- The Life and Loves of Tschaikovsky (1939), with Marika Rökk, Paul Dahlke, Aribert Wäscher
- The Desert Song (1939), with Gustav Knuth, Friedrich Domin, Herbert Wilk, Franz Schafheitlin
- Das Herz der Königin (1940), with Willy Birgel, Axel von Ambesser, Will Quadflieg, Margot Hielscher
- The Way to Freedom (1941), with Hans Stüwe, Agnes Windeck, Siegfried Breuer, Hedwig Wangel
- The Great Love (1942), with Viktor Staal, Paul Hörbiger, Grethe Weiser, Wolfgang Preiss
- Back Then (1943), with Hans Stüwe, Rossano Brazzi, Karl Martell, Hilde Körber, Otto Graf
- Gabriela (1950), with Siegfried Breuer, Carl Raddatz, Grethe Weiser, Gunnar Möller
- Cuba Cabana (1952), with O. W. Fischer, Paul Hartmann, Hans Richter, Eduard Linkers, Karl Meixner, Werner Lieven
- Ave Maria (1953), with Hans Stüwe, Marianne Hold, Hilde Körber, Berta Drews, Carl Wery
- It Was Always So Nice With You (1954), with Willi Forst, Heinz Drache, Sonja Ziemann, Margot Hielscher
- The Blue Moth (1959), with Christian Wolff, Marina Petrowa, Paul Hartmann, Werner Hinz
- The Sky Is Blue (1964, TV film), with Karin Baal, Toni Sailer, Carlos Werner
- How I Learned to Love Women (1966), with Nadja Tiller, Anita Ekberg, Romina Power, Robert Hoffmann, Michèle Mercier

== Operettas and musicals ==
- 1931: Franz Lehár: Die lustige Witwe
- 1936: Ralph Benatzky: Axel an der Himmelstür (as Gloria Mills)
- 1958: Ernst Nebhut, Peter Kreuder: Madame Scandaleuse (as Helene)
- 1960: Oscar Straus: Eine Frau, die weiß, was sie will (as Manon Cavallini)
- 1964: Karl Farkas, Peter Kreuder: Lady aus Paris (as Mrs. Erlynne)
- 1968: Peter Thomas, Ika Schafheitlin, Helmuth Gauer: Wodka für die Königin (as Königin Aureliana)
- 1975: Stephen Sondheim, Hugh Wheeler: Das Lächeln einer Sommernacht (as Madame Armfeldt)

== Sources ==
=== General literature ===
- Ascheid, Antje (2003). Hitler's Heroines: Stardom and Womanhood in Nazi Cinema. Philadelphia: Temple University Press. ISBN 978-1-56639-984-5.
- Bruns, Jana F. (2009). Nazi Cinema's New Woman. Cambridge: Cambridge University Press. ISBN 978-0-521-85685-0.
- Carter, Erica (2004). Dietrich's Ghosts: The Sublime and the Beautiful in Third Reich Film. London: British Film Institute. ISBN 978-0-85170-882-9.
- O'Brien, Mary-Elizabeth (2004). Nazi Cinema as Enchantment: The Politics of Entertainment in the Third Reich. New York: Camden House. ISBN 978-1-57113-283-3.
- Seiler, Paul (1997). Zarah Leander: Ich bin eine Stimme [Zarah Leander: I Am a Voice]. Berlin: Ullstein. ISBN 978-3-548-35711-9.

=== Autobiography ===
- Leander, Zarah (1973). Es war so wunderbar: Mein Leben [It Was So Wonderful: My Life]. Hamburg: Hoffmann und Campe. ISBN 978-3-455-04090-6.
