= Universal Radio (song) =

- The US 12" single cover of "Universal Radio".

Single by Nina Hagen

from the album Nina Hagen in Ekstasy
- B-side: "Prima Nina in Ekstasy"
- Released: January 1985
- Recorded: 1984; Mediterranean Studios, Ibiza
- Genre: Dance-pop; rock
- Length: 3:35
- Label: Columbia
- Songwriter(s): Ron Dumas
- Producer(s): Adam Kidron

Nina Hagen singles chronology
"The Change" (1984)	"Universal Radio" (1985)	"Gott im Himmel" (1985)

Alternative cover
- The UK 12" single cover of "Universal Radio".

"Universal Radio" is a song by German singer Nina Hagen from her third studio album Nina Hagen in Ekstasy (1985). It was released as the lead single from the album in January 1985 by Columbia Records. Written by Ron Dumas and produced by Adam Kidron, "Universal Radio" had modest success on the American charts, peaking at number 39 on the Billboard Hot Dance Club Songs. It was premiered by Rodney Bingenheimer on the radio station KROQ. "Universelles Radio", the German version of the song was also released.

The music video for the song featured a footage of her performance at the Rock in Rio festival from January 13, 1985.

== Background and recording ==
Hagen worked with Ron Dumas, who had previously recorded the song in 1983 with his band Ron Dumas Group. She later described the song as not being musically very interesting and that she originally wanted to do her vocals differently, but was directed by the recording company to make the record more "commercial".

== Track listings ==
- 7" single (UK)
1. "Universal Radio" – 3:35
2. "Prima Nina in Ekstasy" – 4:28
- 12" single (UK)
1. "Universal Radio" (Universal Dance Mix) – 7:00
2. "Universal Radio" (Dub) – 7:25
3. "Prima Nina in Ekstasy" – 4:28
- 12" single (US)
1. "Universal Radio" (Universal Dance Mix) – 7:00
2. "Universal Radio" (Album) – 3:35
3. "Universal Radio" (Dub) – 7:25
- 7" single (Germany)
1. "Universelles Radio" – 3:34
2. "Prima Nina in Ekstase" – 4:01
- 12" single (Germany)
1. "Universelles Radio" – 7:45
2. "Prima Nina in Ekstase" – 4:01
3. "Universelles Radio" (Single Version) – 3:34

== Credits and personnel ==
- Nina Hagen – vocals, songwriter
- Ron Dumas – songwriter
- Adam Kidron – producer
- Richard Scher – remix
- Lotti Golden – remix
- Tom Coyne – mastering
