= Michael Jary =

German composer (1906–1988)

- Born: Maximilian Michael Andreas Jarczyk; 24 September 1906; Laurahütte, Upper Silesia, German Empire
- Died: 12 July 1988 (aged 81); Munich, Bavaria, West Germany
- Occupation: Composer
- Years active: 1936–1970 (film)

Michael Jary (Maximilian Michael Andreas Jarczyk; 24 September 1906 – 12 July 1988) was a German composer who was born in Laurahütte, Siemianowitz and died in Munich.

== Early years ==
Jary's father worked at the Königshütte (Chorzów today) iron works and his mother was a tailor. He planned to become a missionary and went to school at the monastery of the Steyl Missionaries near Neisse (Nysa today), where he discovered his love of music. At the age of 18 he moved to the conservatory at Beuthen (Bytom today). He conducted the church choir and started to write his first chamber music works that were transmitted on the radio Gliwice. The city theatre of Neisse and Plauen gave him a position as a second concert master.

In 1929 Jary was accepted at the Staatliche Akademische Musikhochschule at Berlin, meanwhile he made money playing as a pianist at cafés or movies. In 1931 he received the Beethoven-prize of Berlin.

== During the Nazi years ==
When Jary delivered his graduation concert on 8 February 1933, he was bullied by members of the Kampfbund für deutsche Kultur. Paul Graener, the new director of the Stern’sches Konservatorium denigrated his concert as "the cultural bolshevistic musical stammering of a Polish Jew". Jarczyk had to go underground for some time and used the pseudonyms "Jackie Leeds" for arrangements and "Max Jantzen" for chansons. Recognizing that his name was a hindrance to his career, he changed it to Michael Jary.

Symphonic music was his strength. But after he composed his first musical score for a movie, Die große und die kleine Welt, he quickly became a cult favourite among professional musicians. The possibilities of multiple track recording caught his interest. Swing-arrangements and Jazz were part of his repertoire in spite of governmental diktats. Among other projects he composed a cyclus of musical zodiac interpretations. He became an expert in jazz and swing during the thirties.

In 1938 he had his first popular music hit, Roter Mohn. As the director of the Szymanowski-Gedächtniskonzertes in Berlin he was invited by Ernest Ansermet to Geneva. However, the Nazi authorities denied him an exit visa. Forced to stay in Germany, he wrote, often with the lyricist Bruno Balz, songs for movies that became hits, including: Ich weiß, es wird einmal ein Wunder geschehen and Davon geht die Welt nicht unter.

== After WWII ==
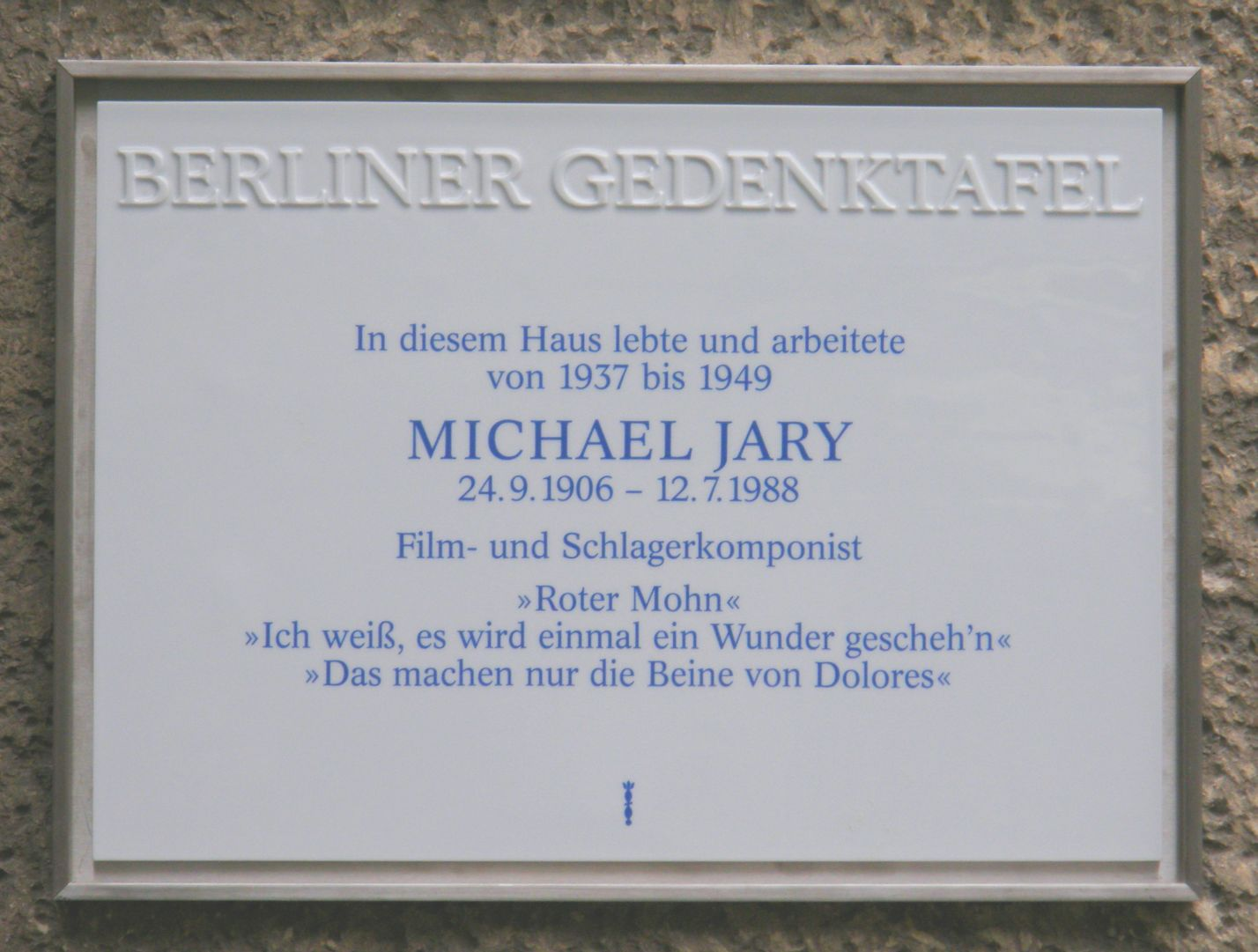

Shortly before the end of World War II Jary had founded his own ensemble. Just 19 days after the capitulation his group became the basis for the new Radio Berlin Tanzorchester (RBT) in East Berlin. He engaged among others Ilse Werner and Bully Buhlan.

In 1948 he created his own production company, Michael Jary-Produktion, and maintained an office during the fifties in New York. He would have liked to have written musical scores for revue films as he had done in 1943 for the movie Karneval der Liebe. In 1949 he moved to Hamburg, and Jary was very successful as film score followed film score including „Leise rauscht es am Missouri“, „Das machen nur die Beine von Dolores“, „Mäki-Boogie“, „Heut' liegt was in der Luft“ and others. These songs were interpreted by artists such as Zarah Leander, Rosita Serrano, Evelyn Künneke, Gerhard Wendland, Heinz Rühmann, and Hans Albers.

By the end of the fifties, „Mäki“, as he was called by his friends, restricted his output and shunned cheap movies. For the Eurovision Song Contest in 1960 he composed „Wir wollen niemals auseinandergehn“ for Heidi Brühl. It wasn't selected to represent Germany, but it went to the top of the German charts, and today it is one of the greatest successes of the history of the German Schlager.

After this personal victory Jary returned to his roots. He composed the musical Nicole, that was first shown in Nürnberg in 1963 and would be celebrated later in Eastern Europe. He settled in his final domicile in Switzerland above the Lake of Lugano. He suffered from three heart attacks in 1973.

Michael Jary died on 12 July 1988 in Munich. His grave is in the Friedhof Ohlsdorf in Hamburg. His brother Herbert Jarczyk was also a noted composer of film scores.

== Selected filmography ==
- Game on Board (1936)
- Adventure in Warsaw (1937)
- A Diplomatic Wife (1937)
- All Lies (1938)
- Bachelor's Paradise (1939)
- Men Are That Way (1939)
- The Leghorn Hat (1939)
- Counterfeiters (1940)
- Two Worlds (1940)
- Goodbye, Franziska (1941)
- The Great Love (1942)
- The Big Game (1942)
- Melody of a Great City (1943)
- Beloved Darling (1943)
- Carnival of Love (1943)
- Gabriele Dambrone (1943)
- A Man With Principles? (1943)
- Mask in Blue (1943)
- Melusine (1944)
- That Was My Life (1944)
- A Man Like Maximilian (1945)
- And If We Should Meet Again (1947)
- Street Acquaintances (1948)
- Dangerous Guests (1949)
- Third from the Right (1950)
- The Man in Search of Himself (1950)
- The Allure of Danger (1950)
- Abundance of Life (1950)
- Gabriela (1950)
- You Have to be Beautiful (1951)
- Maya of the Seven Veils (1951)
- Dance Into Happiness (1951)
- Toxi (1952)
- The Chaste Libertine (1952)
- Queen of the Arena (1952)
- The Colourful Dream (1952)
- The Thief of Bagdad (1952)
- Under the Thousand Lanterns (1952)
- Mikosch Comes In (1952)
- Hit Parade (1953)
- Secretly Still and Quiet (1953)
- Not Afraid of Big Animals (1953)
- The Flower of Hawaii (1953)
- Columbus Discovers Kraehwinkel (1954)
- The Big Star Parade (1954)
- The Telephone Operator (1954)
- Bandits of the Autobahn (1955)
- Father's Day (1955)
- How Do I Become a Film Star? (1955)
- Secrets of the City (1955)
- Three Days Confined to Barracks (1955)
- The Stolen Trousers (1956)
- The Zurich Engagement (1957)
- The Legs of Dolores (1957)
- At the Green Cockatoo by Night (1957)
- The Heart of St. Pauli (1957)
- Lilli (1958)
- My Husband, the Economic Miracle (1961)
- Pichler's Books Are Not in Order (1961)
