= Smack Jack =

Single by Nina Hagen

from the album NunSexMonkRock
- B-side: "Cosma Shiva"
- Released: 1982
- Recorded: 1982; Blue Rock Studios; (New York City, New York)
- Genre: Post-punk; new wave
- Length: 3:28
- Label: CBS
- Songwriter(s): Ferdinand Karmelk
- Producer(s): Mike Thorne

Nina Hagen singles chronology
"My Way" (1980)	"Smack Jack" (1982)	"New York / N.Y." (1983)

"Smack Jack" is a song by German singer Nina Hagen released in 1982 by CBS Records as a lead single from her debut solo album NunSexMonkRock. It deals with a drug addiction and is actually written by Hagen's Dutch ex-boyfriend and father of her daughter Cosma Shiva, Ferdinand "Ferdi" Karmelk, who was a heroin addict and later died of AIDS in 1988. It is Hagen's second song addressing this theme after her 1979 song "Herrmann Hiess Er", which is believed to be about her ex-boyfriend Herman Brood. The music video for the song shows Hagen dressed as a man with two of her other transformations dancing in the background and singing the chorus.

== Track listings ==
- 7" single (Europe)
1. "Smack Jack" – 3:28
2. "Cosma Shiva" – 3:15
- 12" single (Europe)
1. "Smack Jack" – 5:10
2. "Cosma Shiva" – 3:15
- 12" promo single (US)
1. "Smack Jack" – 5:14
2. "Cosma Shiva" – 3:20
3. "Born In Xixax" – 2:55
