= Interzone (band) =

German musical group

Interzone were a German blues/rock/heavy metal band from the early 1980s, headed by vocalist Heiner Pudelko. During the period from 1979 to 1986 the band released three albums and a number of singles. In 2019, 24 years after the death of Pudelko, Interzone released the album Letzte Ausfahrt, which featured songs with lyrics set to the works of Wolf Wondratschek.

== Discography ==
=== Albums ===
- Letzte Ausfahrt (2019)
