= Bruno Balz =

German songwriter

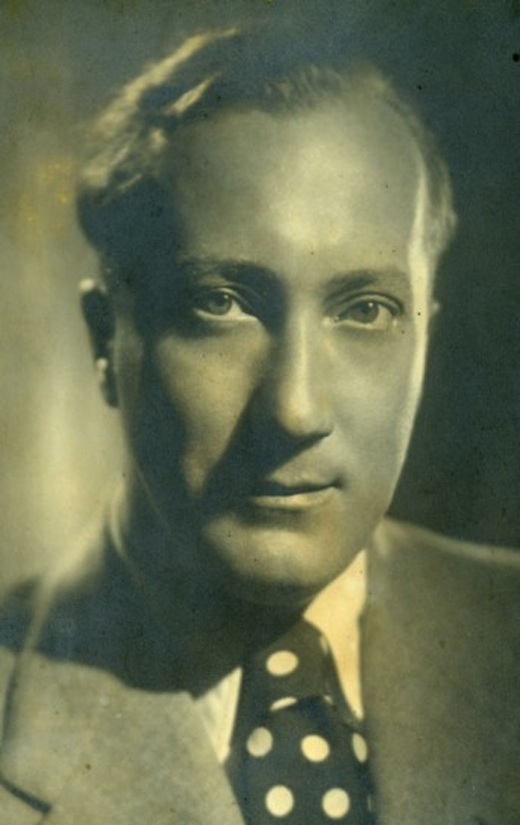
Bruno Balz at 33

Bruno Balz (6 October 1902 – 14 March 1988) was a German songwriter and schlager writer.

From the time he wrote the music for the first German sound film until his retirement in the 1960s, Balz was responsible for the lyrics to over a thousand popular hits. Much of his output was in conjunction with the composer Michael Jary; their songs helped make the singer Zarah Leander popular.

Balz was arrested several times for homosexuality. In 1936, he spent several months in prison and was released under an agreement that mandated that his name was no longer to appear in public. To maintain the appearance of propriety, he entered a "lavender marriage" with a woman named Selma. He was rearrested in 1941 by the Gestapo and was kept in the Gestapo headquarters in Prinz-Albrecht-Straße. He was released from imprisonment by the intervention of Jary, who persuaded officials that he could produce songs that would aid the war effort. Within a day of his release, they had written two of their greatest successes, "Davon geht die Welt nicht unter" ("This Will Not End the World") and "Ich weiß, es wird einmal ein Wunder gescheh'n" ("I Know Some Day a Miracle Will Happen"). His film songs for Leander, a star of UFA musicals, which were later criticised as having helped public and armed forces morale during the war, became anthems for homosexuals imprisoned in concentration camps.

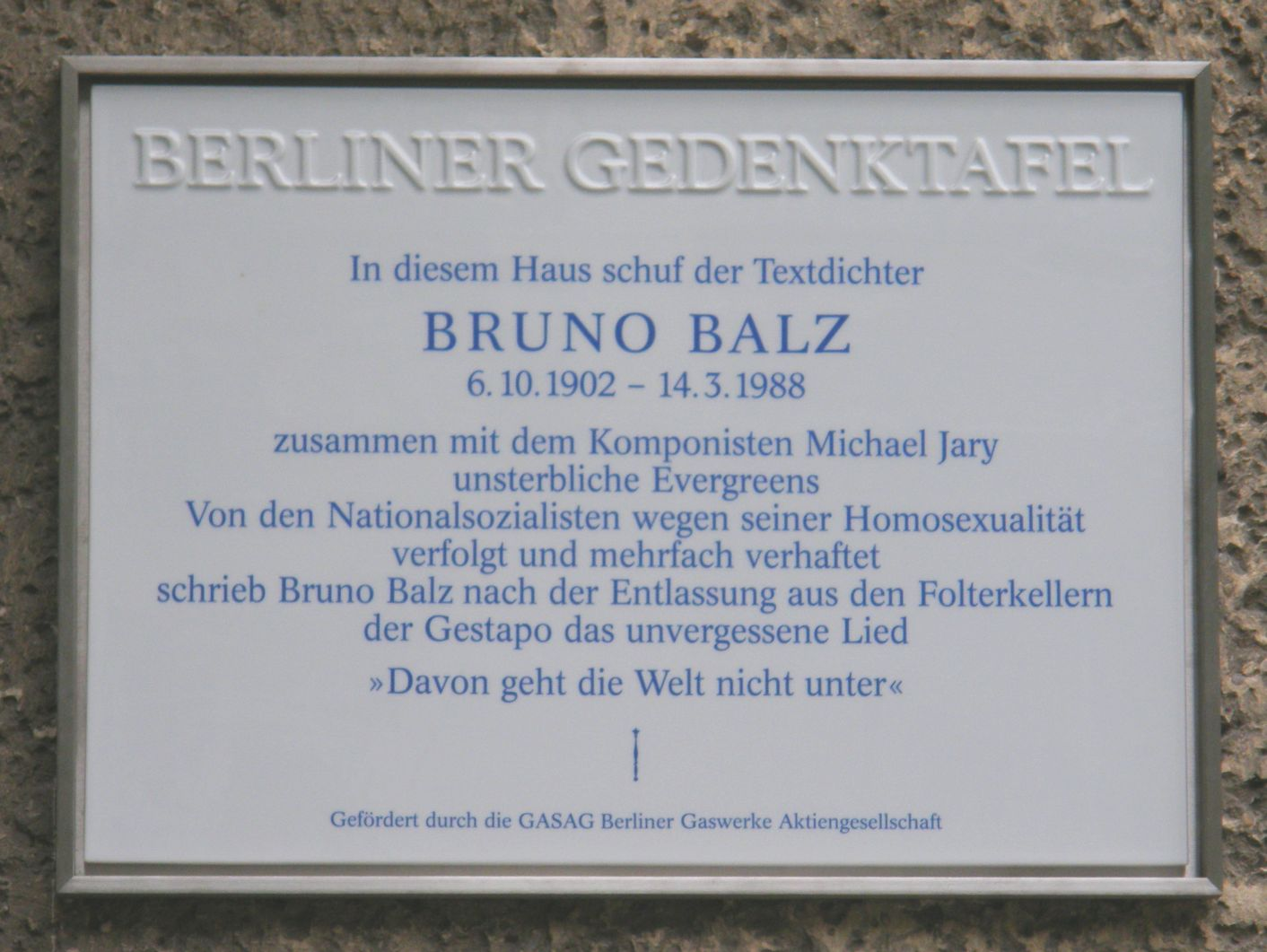
2008 commemorative plaque (de) at the birthplace of Balz at Fasanenstraße 60, 10719 Berlin

The fall of the Nazi regime did not spell an end to the persecution of Balz, as Paragraph 175, the law against homosexuality, continued in force. Thus, his name is considerably less well-known than if he had been properly credited for his lyrics.

Balz's companion was painter and actor Jürgen Draeger, who was enjoined by a clause in Balz's will from talking about their relations for ten years following Balz's death.

The Bruno Balz Theatre in Berlin is named for him.

== Selected filmography ==
- It's You I Have Loved (1929)
- Journey to Happiness (1948)
- Cuba Cabana (1952)

== Songtexts ==
- Das kann doch einen Seemann nicht erschüttern (melody: Michael Jary, in: Paradies der Junggesellen)
- Wir wollen niemals auseinandergehn" (melody:Michael Jary)
- Das machen nur die Beine von Dolores (melody:Michael Jary)
- Kann denn Liebe Sünde sein? (Lothar Brühne, in: Der Blaufuchs)
- Roter Mohn (Michael Jary, in: Schwarzfahrt ins Glück)
- Der Wind hat mir ein Lied erzählt (Lothar Brühne, in: La Habanera)
- Davon geht die Welt nicht unter (Michael Jary, in: Die große Liebe)
- Ich weiß, es wird einmal ein Wunder gescheh'n (Michael Jary, in: Die große Liebe)
- Ich sende dir Rosen (Red Roses for a Blue Lady')
- Turandot, bezaubernde Turandot (music by Franz Doelle, in Princess Turandot (1935), directed by Gunther Stapenhorst)
