= Unbehagen =

Studio album by Nina Hagen Band
- Released: February 25, 1980
- Recorded: October 1978–November 1979
- Studios: Hansa Tonstudio, Berlin
- Genres: Punk rock; Neue Deutsche Welle; new wave
- Length: 37:39
- Label: CBS Records
- Producers: Nina Hagen Band; Ralph Nowy; Tom Müller

Nina Hagen Band chronology
Nina Hagen Band (1978)	Unbehagen (1980)	NunSexMonkRock (1982)

Singles from Unbehagen
- 1. "African Reggae" Released: 1980; 2. "Auf'm Rummel" Released: 1980; 3. "Herrmann hiess er" Released: 1980

Alternative cover

Professional ratings
Review scores
Source	Rating
Europopmusic.eu	5/5 stars
Record Mirror	2.5/5 stars
Smash Hits	8/10

Unbehagen is the second studio album by Nina Hagen Band, released on February 25, 1980 by CBS Records. It is the last album released by the band, before Nina Hagen decided to pursue a solo career. The band kept on performing under the name Spliff.

The album produced three singles, "African Reggae", "Herrmann hiess er" and "Auf'm Rummel". "Herrmann hiess er" deals with drug addiction and is believed to be about Hagen's ex-boyfriend Herman Brood. An accompanying music video was also released. The album also contains a German cover version, "Wir leben immer... noch", of Lene Lovich's hit single "Lucky Number". The song "Wenn ich ein Junge wär" was recorded live in April 1979 at the Saarbrücken Congress Hall.

The album was a chart success and was certified Gold in Germany in 1981, selling over 250,000 copies.

== Track listing ==
No.	Title	Writer(s)	Length
1.	"African Reggae"	Reinhold Heil; Bernhard Potschka; Nina Hagen	6:17
2.	"Alptraum"	Herwig Mitteregger; Hagen	6:10
3.	"Wir leben immer… noch (Lucky Number)"	Lene Lovich; Les Chappell; Hagen	4:53
4.	"Wenn ich ein Junge wär" (Live Version)	Heinz Buchholz; Rudolf-Günter Loose	2:14
5.	"Herrmann hiess er"	Manfred Praeker; Hagen	6:34
6.	"Auf'm Rummel"	Potschka; Hagen	4:32
7.	"Wau Wau"	Heil; Mitteregger; Potschka; Praeker; Hagen	2:07
8.	"Fall in Love mit mir"	Heil; Mitteregger; Potschka; Praeker; Hagen	3:47
9.	"No Way" (Instrumental)	Heil; Mitteregger; Potschka; Praeker	1:05
Total length:			37:39

== Personnel ==
Nina Hagen Band

- Nina Hagen – vocals
- Bernhard Potschka – guitar
- Reinhold Heil – keyboards; bass synthesiser on "No Way"
- Manfred Praeker – bass; rhythm guitar on "No Way"
- Herwig Mitteregger – drums, percussion

Technical

- Ruiz & Carlier – artwork, design
- Alain Bizos – photography

== Charts ==
Chart (1980)	Peak position
Austrian Albums (Ö3 Austria)	9
French Albums (SNEP)	3
German Albums (Offizielle Top 100)	2
Dutch Albums (Album Top 100)	19
New Zealand Albums (RMNZ)	40
Norwegian Albums (VG-lista)	10
Swedish Albums (Sverigetopplistan)	8

=== Year-end charts ===
Chart (1980)	Position
German Albums (Offizielle Top 100)	16

== Certifications ==
Region	Certification	Certified units/sales
France (SNEP)	2× Gold	200,000^{*}
Germany (BVMI)	Gold	250,000^{^}
^{*} Sales figures based on certification alone.^{^} Shipments figures based on certification alone.
