= Nina Hagen in Ekstasy =

In Ekstasy / In Ekstase

Studio album by Nina Hagen
- Released: May 1985
- Recorded: 1984
- Studios: Mediterranean Studios, Ibiza; Maracadet Studios, Paris
- Genres: Punk rock; new wave
- Length: 37:45 (US Version); 35:24 (German Version)
- Label: CBS
- Producer: Adam Kidron

Nina Hagen chronology
Angstlos / Fearless (1983)	In Ekstasy / In Ekstase (1985)	Nina Hagen (1989)

Singles from In Ekstasy / In Ekstase
- 1. "My Way" Released: 1980; 2. "Universal Radio" Released: 1985; 3. "Gott im Himmel" Released: 1985

Professional ratings
Review scores
Source	Rating
AllMusic	3/5 stars

In Ekstasy is the third solo (and fifth overall) studio album by German singer Nina Hagen. It was released in May, 1985, by CBS Records. The German version of the album In Ekstase was released simultaneously. It was Hagen's last album released on the CBS label, before her recording contract expired in 1986. The album is mainly produced by Adam Kidron and was recorded in Ibiza and Paris. Hagen worked with Karl Rucker and Billy Liesegang and wrote most of the songs on the album. Unlike her previous disco-influenced album Fearless (1983), In Ekstasy is musically more punk rock with elements of dance music. It contains cover versions of Frank Sinatra's "My Way" and Norman Greenbaum's "Spirit in the Sky".

After its release, In Ekstasy received mixed reviews from the critics and although it was released during the rise of Hagen's popularity in the United States, the album was not a big commercial success, narrowly missing the Billboard 200 and peaking at number one on the "Bubbling Under the Top LPs" chart. She appeared as a guest on many television shows, including Late Night with David Letterman and The Merv Griffin Show, where she promoted the record. In January 1985, she performed at one of the largest music festivals in the world, Rock in Rio, where she performed most of the songs from the album.

The lead single "Universal Radio" became a club hit, peaking at number 39 on the Billboard Hot Dance Club Songs.

== Background and recording ==
After the success of her 1983 album Fearless, Hagen went on to record a new album, more punk rock than her previous one. She changed her image, sporting a shocking pink, waist-length mane and black eye makeup, and teamed up with Karl Rucker, with whom she had already worked on her two previous albums, and started working with Billy Liesegang and Peter Krause. The recording process was affected by Adam Kidron's motorbike accident which caused him getting numbness in his arm.

== Composition ==
Hagen has been vocally compared to Wendy O. Williams. The opening and lead song "Universal Radio" was co-written by Hagen and Ron Dumas, who had previously recorded the song in 1983 with his band Ron Dumas Group. She later described the song as not being musically very interesting and that she originally wanted to do her vocals differently, but was directed by the recording company to make the record more "commercial". "Gods of Aquarius" begins with a downtempo intro before becoming a heavy rock song, resembling some of Billy Idol's early records. Lyrically, the song is one of many, where Hagen talks about UFOs, referring to her 1981 experience with spotting something that looked like a cosmic ship in Malibu. It was during the time she was pregnant with her daughter Cosma Shiva. On "Russian Reggae" she puts on fake, over-the-top Russian accent and sings about the dangers of a nuclear war. Her take on Paul Anka's song "My Way" was already recorded and released on her 1980 extended play, but became one of her signature songs, which she performed at many of her shows. In the next song, Hagen talks about living on a fictional street "1985 Ekstasy Drive". The track has heavy guitar riffs and simple lyrics.

In "Prima Nina in Ekstasy", Hagen sings about herself being entitled the "Mother of Punk". When she arrived in London in 1977, she was already 21, while the other people on the punk scene were all about 15 or 16 years old. That was when she first received the title. The song features heavy synths and male background vocals. The cover version of Norman Greenbaum's "Spirit in the Sky" appears on the album in two versions. The first is in English and the second, "Gott In Himmel", is a reprise sung in German. It again refers to her UFO sighting in Malibu. "Atomic Flash Deluxe" is built around a simple bassline and electronic samples. It is the most experimental song on the album. Hagen mentions cocaine, harakiri and Babylon. The last song is a punk version of "The Lord's Prayer", which features an interpolation of Aram Khachaturian's "Sabre Dance".

== Promotion ==
=== Singles ===
"Universal Radio" was released as the album's lead single. The song was premiered by Rodney Bingenheimer on the radio station KROQ. It was the only song of the album that got in the charts. It peaked at number 39 on the Billboard Hot Dance Club Songs. The music video for the song featured a footage of her performance at the Rock in Rio festival. "Spirit in the Sky" was released a promotional single. The music video for "1985 Ekstasy Drive" was also released. It was shot in the streets of Los Angeles, California.

== Track listing ==
In Ekstasy
No.	Title	Writer(s)	Length
1.	"Universal Radio"	Roger Dumas	3:35
2.	"Gods of Aquarius"	Nina Hagen; Karl Rucker	3:27
3.	"Russian Reggae"	Hagen; Rucker; Michael Dosco	4:35
4.	"My Way"	Hagen; Gilles Thibaut; Claude François; Jacques Revaux; Paul Anka	4:26
5.	"1985 Ekstasy Drive"	Hagen; Rucker; Billy Liesegang; Peter Krause	3:20
6.	"Prima Nina in Ekstasy"	Hagen; Rucker	4:28
7.	"Spirit in the Sky"	Norman Greenbaum	5:15
8.	"Atomic Flash Deluxe"	Hagen; Dr. Livingstone; Max Lorentz	4:02
9.	"The Lord's Prayer"	Hagen; Rucker	3:21
10.	"Gott im Himmel"	Hagen	1:16
Total length:			37:45

CD bonus track
No.	Title	Writer(s)	Length
11.	"Universal Radio" (Dance Mix)	Dumas	6:58
Total length:			44:43

In Ekstase (German Version)
No.	Title	Writer(s)	Length
1.	"Universelles Radio"	Dumas; Hagen	3:34
2.	"Die Ufos Sind Da"	Hagen; Rucker	3:29
3.	"Russischer Reggae"	Hagen; Rucker; Dosco	4:29
4.	"My Way"	Hagen; Thibaut; François; Revaux; Anka	4:25
5.	"1985 Ekstasy Drive"	Hagen; Rucker; Liesegang; Krause	3:22
6.	"Prima Nina in Ekstase"	Hagen; Rucker	4:01
7.	"Gott Im Himmel (Spirit in the Sky)"	Hagen; Greenbaum	3:39
8.	"Atomic Flash De Luxe"	Hagen; Livingstone; Max Lorentz	4:02
9.	"Vater Unser"	Hagen; Rucker	3:24
10.	"Gott Im Himmel (Spirit in the Sky) / Reprise"	Hagen; Greenbaum	0:59
Total length:			35:24

== Personnel ==
Credits adapted from the album's liner notes.

- Nina Hagen – vocals
- Billy Liesegang – guitar
- Peter Krause – drums
- Alex Laroque – drums
- Karl Rucker – bass, keyboards, drums
- Roger Scott Craig – keyboards
- Michael McEvoy – keyboards, horn arrangements
- Balis Jiouraitis – grand piano
- Alain Guillard – saxophone
- Eric Le Lann – trumpet
- Afrika Bambaataa & Soulsonic Force, Shango – vocals on "Prima Nina in Ekstasy"
- Paul Eknes – background vocals on "Spirits in the Sky"

Design

- Juliana Grigorova Knepler – cover art, design
- Diana Lyn – photography
- Mark Murphy – collages

Production

- Adam Kidron – producer, engineer
- Richard James Burgess – producer on "My Way"
- Alain Français – engineer
- Vladimir Meller – engineer, mastering
- Trevor Hallesy – engineer

== Charts ==
Chart (1985)	Peak position
Austrian Albums (Ö3 Austria)	13
Canada Top Albums/CDs (RPM)	95
German Albums (Offizielle Top 100)	24
New Zealand Albums (RMNZ)	43
Swedish Albums (Sverigetopplistan)	36
Swiss Albums (Schweizer Hitparade)	13
US Cashbox Top 200	146
