= Herwig Mitteregger =

Austrian musician

Herwig Rudolf Mitteregger (born 6 September 1953) is an Austrian musician. He became known with the Nina Hagen Band, where he played drums and percussions. He was most famous as a member of German rock band Spliff.

== Career ==
Herwig Mitteregger (drums and percussions), Bernhard Potschka (guitar), Manfred Praeker (bass) played together in the band Lok Kreuzberg, before they and Reinhold Heil (keyboards) joined Nina Hagen to form the Nina Hagen Band. After two albums with Nina Hagen, he founded with his mates from the Nina Hagen Band – Bernhard Potschka (guitar), Manfred Praeker (bass), Reinhold Heil (keyboards) – Spliff. After four records the band split up, because the fourth album was not successful. Mitteregger released five solo albums. Then he moved to Spain and became a father. In 2008, he returned to Germany and released Insolito on his own label. In 2009, he published the album Fandango on his own label. He lives in Hamburg, Germany.

== Discography ==
=== Solo ===
==== Albums ====
- Kein Mut. Kein Mädchen (1983)
- Immer Mehr (1985)
- Jedesmal (1987)
- Mitteregger (1989)
- Wie Im Leben (1992)
- Aus Der Stille (1997)
- Insolito (2008)
- Fandango (2009)

=== With Spliff ===
==== Albums ====
- The Spliff Radio Show (1980)
- 85555 (1982)
- Herzlichen Glückwunsch (1982)
- Schwarz auf Weiss (1984)

=== With the Nina Hagen Band ===
==== Albums ====
- Nina Hagen Band (1978)
- unbehagen (1979)
