= Spliff (band) =

German musical group

- Origin: Berlin, Germany
- Genres: Neue Deutsche Welle, rock
- Years active: 1980-1985
- Label: CBS
- Members: Herwig Mitteregger; Reinhold Heil; Manfred Praeker; Bernhard Potschka
- Website: spliffband.com

Spliff was a German band that existed from 1980 to 1985. Their musical repertoire combined rock, funk, and electronic music. The keyboard sounds of Reinhold Heil, and later the electronic drums of the Simmons SDSV brand, especially defined the sound of their music.

== History ==
Herwig Mitteregger, Bernhard Potschka and Manfred Praeker met in the political rock band Lokomotive Kreuzberg. Together with Reinhold Heil, who was then active in the jazz group Bakmak, and Nina Hagen, they became known as the Nina Hagen Band and released two albums.

After the separation from Nina Hagen, the four musicians, at the suggestion of manager Jim Rakete, along with singer Alf Klimek (“Klimax”), German-American DJ Rik De Lisle, and singers Lisa Bialac and Lyma Russel, created the rock opera Spliff Radio Show. It premiered live on May 24, 1980, at the Berliner Kant-Kino; it is described as “a bitter satire on the music business centered on the fictional rock star Rocko J. Fonzo,” focusing on his rise and fall. The English-language album was performed in Paris, Zurich, Amsterdam, Stockholm, and London and was released in 1980 (by CBS). Although the album cover does not explicitly label Spliff as the band's name but rather as part of the album title, the liner notes state “Spliff are” with the four band members listed; Alf Klimek appears under “starring,” while Lyma Russel, Lisa Bialac, and Rik De Lisle are listed under “featuring.” The background for this choice was that the Spliff members wanted to avoid repeating the ultimately negative experiences they had with Nina Hagen and therefore distanced themselves from “front performers.”

At the beginning of 1982, their first German-language album 85555 was released under their new band name, Spliff. The band name refers to an alternative term for a hashish cigarette (joint) and is based on the “Spliff” call in the Nina Hagen song Heiß from the LP Nina Hagen Band. The album was named after its catalog number (similar to the Yes album 90125 a year later). It has a simple cover design with gray and red lettering on a white background. Spliff was subsequently associated with the so-called Neue Deutsche Welle, although the band “couldn’t do much with” this label. The album also came out in an English-language version as 85555 International Version. It has a different cover; it shows the band, with Reinhold Heil holding the LP cover of the German version in his hands.

Their biggest hits from this period were Heut’ Nacht and Carbonara. The further singles Déjà Vu (from 85555) and Das Blech (from the also German-language album Herzlichen Glückwunsch, released in late 1982) were also successful in the German charts. The video for Herzlichen Glückwunsch was produced with the later trance producer Paul Schmitz-Moormann. In 1984, the last regular Spliff album, Schwarz auf Weiß, was released with the single Radio, for which the group went on a comparatively unsuccessful tour with Curt Cress on drums. In 1985, the band split up due to musical differences and various solo projects by the members.

== Joint activities after the split ==
Reinhold Heil, Manfred Praeker, and Bernhard Potschka founded the group Froon in 1987 with Lyndon Connah; however, they only had a minor hit with "Bobby Mugabe," and the group disbanded again in 1989.

In 1990, CBS released the CD Spliff Remix, on which various producers remixed well-known Spliff songs. In 1992, a Spliff box set Alles Gute in aluminum packaging was released, documenting the band’s greatest successes.

In 2004, Manfred Praeker and Bernhard Potschka reunited and, together with manager Andy Eder, founded the band Bockx auf Spliff. They recorded new versions of old Spliff songs as well as original pieces. However, no CD was released, and only a few performances took place.

== Members ==
- Herwig Mitteregger - drums, vocals
- Reinhold Heil - keyboards, vocals
- Manfred Praeker - bass, vocals
- Bernhard Potschka - guitar, vocals

== Former members ==
- Alf Klimek - 1980
- Rik De Lisle - 1980
- Lisa Bialac - 1980
- Lyma Russel - 1980
- Billy Gwartney - 1980
- Curt Cress - (Tour-'1984/'1985)

== Solo careers and work for other artists ==
The Spliff musicians produced and wrote for other artists who were also managed by Jim Rakete. From 1982 to 1986, Manfred Praeker and Reinhold Heil produced the group Nena, including their debut album of the same name, helping them achieve major international success. The song "Einmal ist keinmal" was written by Praeker.

In 1984, Praeker produced the LP der Woche for Extrabreit and in 1986 the album Die Ärzte for the band of the same name. He was also active as a guest musician, contributing to works for artists such as Achim Reichel.

Herwig Mitteregger has been releasing solo albums since 1983. His biggest commercial hit was the 1985 single "Immer mehr" from the album of the same name. Three more albums followed on CBS/Sony until 1993, and an LP in 1997 on Universal. After a long break, during which Mitteregger, living in Spain, devoted himself primarily to his family and only occasionally performed in Germany, he released the album Insolito on his own label Manoscrito on May 23, 2008, followed by Fandango in June 2009.

Also noteworthy is Mitteregger's collaboration with Manfred Maurenbrecher and Ulla Meinecke, for whom he produced several albums featuring himself and some Spliff members. The Meinecke duet "Feuer unter’m Eis" appeared in 1983 on the LP Wenn schon nicht für immer, dann wenigstens für ewig.

Under the project name Potschka / Perxon, Bernhard Potschka released an album with other musicians in 1992. Since the mid-1990s, Potschka has focused increasingly on flamenco, releasing three albums under his own name, producing the 1999 album River of Return by the Berlin group Agitation Free (for which he played flamenco guitar and Udu on the track "Das kleine Uhrwerk"), and performing more frequently as a soloist or with the duo Gitarra Pura.

Reinhold Heil, together with his partner Rosa Precht, who had also played keyboards in Ulla Meinecke's band, formed the project Cosa Rosa. They released the album Traumstation in 1983, featuring the single "Rosa auf Hawaii," the 1985 album Kein Zufall with the singles "In meinen Armen" and "Millionenmal," and the album Cosa Rosa in 1986. Rosa Precht died of stomach cancer at the age of 38. Since the late 1990s, Heil has been successful as a film composer in the USA. Among many other works, he composed and performed music for Run Lola Run and Perfume: The Story of a Murderer.

== Discography ==
=== Studio albums ===
- The Spliff Radio Show (1980)
- 85555 (1982)
- 85555 – International Version (1982)
- Herzlichen Glückwunsch! (1982)
- Schwarz auf weiß (1984)

=== Compilation albums ===
- Alles Gute – Das Beste von Spliff (1994)
