= List of East German films =

This is a list, in year order, of the most notable films produced in the Soviet Occupation Zone of Germany and the socialist German Democratic Republic (GDR, East Germany) from 1945 until German Reunification in October 1990.

The state owned East German film company DEFA produced about 800 feature films between 1946 and 1992. Besides DEFA, the state broadcaster DFF and the Deutsche Hochschule für Filmkunst (now the Filmuniversität Babelsberg) were the only other organizations in the GDR that produced feature films for cinematic release, although far fewer than DEFA. DEFA also produced about 750 animated movies and more than 2500 documentaries and short films.

DEFA feature films are accessible and licensable as part of DEFA's entire film heritage on the PROGRESS archive platform.

For an alphabetical list of articles on East German films see Category:East German films.

== 1945–1949 (the Soviet Sector of Germany) ==
Note that the German Democratic Republic formally came into existence in October 1949.

Title	Director	Cast	Genre	Notes
1946
Allez Hopp	Hans Fritz Köllner	Ernst Stahl-Nachbaur, Babsi Schultz-Reckewell	Drama	
Berlin im Aufbau	Kurt Maetzig		Documentary, short	
Dresden	Richard Groschopp		Documentary, short	
Einheit SPD-KPD	Kurt Maetzig		Documentary, short	
Die Fledermaus	Géza von Bolváry	Marte Harell, Johannes Heesters	Operetta	Based on Johann Strauss II's operetta Die Fledermaus; filmed in 1944
Freies Land	Milo Harbich	Ursula Voß, Herbert Wilk	Drama	
Irgendwo in Berlin	Gerhard Lamprecht	Mady Rahl, Rotraut Richter	Drama	
Die Mörder sind unter uns	Wolfgang Staudte	Wilhelm Borchert, Hildegard Knef	Drama, Trümmerfilm	
Peter Voss, der Millionendieb	Karl Anton	Viktor de Kowa, Else von Möllendorff	Comedy, crime	Filmed between 1943 and 1945
Potsdam baut auf	Joop Huisken		Documentary, short	
1947
Ehe im Schatten	Kurt Maetzig	Paul Klinger, Ilse Steppat	Melodrama	Based on the life of German actor Joachim Gottschalk
Kein Platz für Liebe	Hans Deppe	Bruni Löbel, Heinz Lausch	Comedy	
Razzia	Werner Klingler	Paul Bildt, Agathe Poschmann	Crime	
Wozzeck	Georg C. Klaren	Kurt Meisel, Helga Zülch	Drama	
1948
1-2-3 Corona	Hans Müller	Eva Ingeborg Scholz, Lutz Moik	Crime, drama	
Affaire Blum	Erich Engel	Hans Christian Blech, Ernst Waldow	Drama	Based on a 1926 murder trial of a German-Jewish industrialist in Magdeburg
Chemie und Liebe	Arthur Maria Rabenalt	Hans Nielsen, Tilly Lauenstein	Comedy	
Grube Morgenrot	Erich Freund, Wolfgang Schleif	Claus Holm, Maria Rouvel	Drama	
Das kleine Hofkonzert	Paul Verhoeven	Elfie Mayerhofer, Hans Nielsen	Musical	Filmed in 1944
Die seltsamen Abenteuer des Herrn Fridolin B.	Wolfgang Staudte	Axel von Ambesser, Ilse Petri	Comedy	
Straßenbekanntschaft	Peter Pewas	Gisela Trowe, Alice Treff	Drama	
Und wieder 48	Gustav von Wangenheim	Inge von Wangenheim, Wilhelm Borchert	Drama	
1949
Der Biberpelz	Erich Engel	Fita Benkhoff, Werner Hinz	Comedy	Based on Gerhart Hauptmann's play The Beaver Coat
The Blue Swords	Wolfgang Schleif	Hans Quest, Ilse Steppat	Biography, drama	Fictionalized biography of Johann Friedrich Böttger
Die Brücke	Arthur Pohl	Karl Hellmer, Fritz Wagner	Drama	
Die Buntkarierten	Kurt Maetzig	Camilla Spira, Werner Hinz	Drama	
Figaros Hochzeit	Georg Wildhagen	Angelika Hauff, Willi Domgraf-Fassbaender	Musical	Based on Wolfgang Amadeus Mozart's opera The Marriage of Figaro
Das Mädchen Christine	Arthur Maria Rabenalt	Wolfgang Lukschy, Petra Peters	Drama	
Quartet of Five	Gerhard Lamprecht	Claus Holm, Yvonne Merin	Comedy, romance	
Rotation	Wolfgang Staudte	Paul Esser, Irene Korb	Drama	Won a Golden Leopard at the 1954 Locarno Film Festival
Träum' nicht, Annette	Eberhard Klagemann, Helmut Weiss	Jenny Jugo, Max Eckard	Comedy	
Unser täglich Brot	Slatan Dudow	Viktoria von Ballasko, Paul Bildt	Drama	

== 1950s ==
Title	Director	Cast	Genre	Notes
1950
Der Auftrag Höglers	Gustav von Wangenheim	Inge von Wangenheim, Fritz Tillmann	Drama	
Bürgermeister Anna	Hans Müller	Eva Rimski, Reinhard Kolldehoff	Comedy	
Familie Benthin	Slatan Dudow, Richard Groschopp, Kurt Maetzig	Maly Delschaft, Charlotte Ander	Crime, drama	
Für ein einiges, glückliches Vaterland	Gerhard Klein		Documentary, short	
Immer bereit	Kurt Maetzig		Documentary	
Die Jungen vom Kranichsee	Arthur Pohl	Gunnar Möller, Monika Siemer	Drama	
Der Kahn der fröhlichen Leute	Hans Heinrich	Petra Peters, Fritz Wagner	Comedy	Based on Jochen Klepper's book Der Kahn der fröhlichen Leute
Das kalte Herz	Paul Verhoeven	Lutz Moik, Hanna Rucker	Fantasy	
Maul- und Klauenseuche	Gerhard Klein		Documentary	
The Merry Wives of Windsor	Georg Wildhagen	Sonja Ziemann, Camilla Spira	Comedy, musical	Based on William Shakespeare's play The Merry Wives of Windsor
Der Rat der Götter	Kurt Maetzig	Paul Bildt, Eva Pflug	Drama	Awarded a special honorary diploma at the 1950 Karlovy Vary International Film Festival
Saure Wochen – frohe Feste	Wolfgang Schleif	Marianne Prenzel, Blandine Ebinger	Comedy	
Secrets of Nature	Israel M. Berman, Boris Dolin		Documentary, short	Compilation of English-language versions of three Soviet and one East German short documentary
Semmelweis – Retter der Mütter	Georg C. Klaren	Karl Paryla, Käthe Braun	Biography, drama	Fictionalized biography of Ignaz Semmelweis
Tiergestalt	Fritz Brunsch		Documentary, short	
Der Weg nach oben	Andrew Thorndike		Documentary	Won Best Documentary Film at the 1951 Karlovy Vary International Film Festival
1951
Aladin	Gerhard Klein		Animation, short	Based on Aladdin
Das Beil von Wandsbek	Falk Harnack	Erwin Geschonneck, Käthe Braun	Drama	Based on Arnold Zweig's novel Das Beil von Wandsbek
Corinna Schmidt	Arthur Pohl	Trude Hesterberg, Willy Kleinoschegg	Drama	Based on Theodor Fontane's novel Frau Jenny Treibel
Die letzte Heuer	E. W. Fiedler, Hans Heinrich	Inge Keller, Hans Klering	Drama	
Die Meere rufen	Eduard Kubat	Hans Klering, Käte Alving	Drama	
Modell Bianka	Richard Groschopp	Gerda Falk, Fritz Wagner	Comedy	
The Sonnenbrucks	Georg C. Klaren	Eduard von Winterstein, Maly Delschaft, Ursula Burg	Drama	Based on Leon Kruczkowski's play Niemcy
Unter dem Rauschen deiner Wimpern	Gerhard Klein		Animation	
Der Untertan	Wolfgang Staudte	Werner Peters, Paul Esser	Comedy, drama	Based on Heinrich Mann's novel Der Untertan
Youth Sports Festival	Andrew Thorndike, Dmitri Vasilyev		Documentary, sports	
Zugverkehr unregelmäßig	Erich Freund	Claus Holm, Inge Keller	Crime	
1952
Bauern erfüllen den Plan	Heiner Carow		Documentary, short	
Blaue Wimpel im Sommerwind	Herbert Ballmann		Documentary	
Frauenschicksale	Slatan Dudow	Sonja Sutter, Lotte Loebinger	Drama	
Freundschaft siegt	Joris Ivens, Ivan Pyryev		Documentary	
Karriere in Paris	Georg C. Klaren, Hans-Georg Rudolph	Günther Ballier, Helmut Bautzmann	Drama	Based on Honoré de Balzac's novel Père Goriot
Roman einer jungen Ehe	Kurt Maetzig	Yvonne Merin, Hans-Peter Thielen	Drama	
Schatten über den Inseln	Otto Meyer	Erwin Geschonneck, Fritz Diez	Drama	
Sein großer Sieg	Franz Barrenstein	Claus Holm, Eva Probst	Drama	
Das verurteilte Dorf	Martin Hellberg	Helga Göring, Günther Simon	Drama	Won a Peace Prize at the 1952 Karlovy Vary International Film Festival
Wilhelm Pieck – Das Leben unseres Präsidenten	Andrew Thorndike		Documentary	
Wyscig pokoju – Warszawa-Berlin-Praga	Joris Ivens		Documentary	East German-Polish co-production
1953
Anna Susanna	Richard Nicolas	Günther Simon, Peter Marx	Drama, crime	
Dorf im Herbst	Heiner Carow		Documentary, short	
Geheimakten Solvay	Martin Hellberg	Wilhelm Koch-Hooge, Leny Marenbach	Thriller	
Die Geschichte vom kleinen Muck	Wolfgang Staudte	Thomas Schmidt, Johannes Maus	Children's, fantasy	Based on Wilhelm Hauff's fairy tale Little Muck
Die Gewehre der Frau Carrar	Egon Monk	Helene Weigel, Erwin Geschonneck	Drama	Live television production of Bertolt Brecht's play Señora Carrar's Rifles
Herren der Felder	Walter Beck		Documentary	
Jacke wie Hose	Eduard Kubat	Irene Korb, Günther Simon	Comedy	
Das Kleine und das große Glück	Martin Hellberg	Bruno Atlas-Eising, Ilse Bastubbe	Drama, romance	
Ein Schritt weiter	Heiner Carow		Documentary, short	
Die Störenfriede	Wolfgang Schleif	Edgar Bennert, Sonja Haacker	Children's	
Die Unbesiegbaren	Arthur Pohl	Alice Treff, Willy A. Kleinau	Historical drama	
Winterurlaub mit dem FDGB	Heiner Carow		Documentary, short	
1954
Alarm im Zirkus	Gerhard Klein	Erwin Geschonneck, Uwe-Jens Pape	Crime	
Carola Lamberti – Eine vom Zirkus	Hans Müller	Henny Porten, Horst Naumann	Drama	
Die Entscheidung des Tilman Riemenschneider	Bodo von Schweykowski		Biography	Fictionalized television biography about Tilman Riemenschneider
Ernst Thälmann – Sohn seiner Klasse	Kurt Maetzig	Günther Simon, Hans-Peter Minetti	Biography, drama	First of a two-part fictionalized biography of Ernst Thälmann; won a Peace Prize at the 1954 Karlovy Vary International Film Festival
Der Fall Dr. Wagner	Harald Mannl, Carl Balhaus (co-director)	Harald Mannl, Johanna Endemann	Crime	
Forschen und Schaffen. Folge VI	Heiner Carow		Documentary	
Gefährliche Fracht	Gustav von Wangenheim	Karl Block, Walter Brandt	Adventure	Won a Peace Prize at the 1954 Karlovy Vary International Film Festival
Das geheimnisvolle Wrack	Herbert Ballmann	Kurt Ulrich, Wilfried Ortmann	Adventure	
Hexen	Helmut Spieß	Lothar Blumhagen, Albert Garbe	Comedy, drama	
Kein Hüsung	Arthur Pohl	Fredy Barten, Ilse Bastubbe	Drama	Based on Fritz Reuter's narrative poem Kein Hüsung
Leuchtfeuer	Wolfgang Staudte	Leonhard Ritter, Horst Naumann	Drama	East German-Swedish co-production
Das Lied der Ströme	Joop Huisken, Joris Ivens, Robert Ménégoz		Documentary	
Ludwig van Beethoven	Max Jaap		Documentary	Documentary about the life of Ludwig van Beethoven
Pole Poppenspäler	Arthur Pohl	Heliane Bei, Heinz Höpner	Children's, drama, fantasy	Based on Theodor Storm's novella Pole Poppenspäler
Die Sieben vom Rhein	Andrew Thorndike, Annelie Thorndike		Documentary	
Ein Strom fließt durch Deutschland	Joachim Kunert		Documentary	
Stärker als die Nacht	Slatan Dudow	Wilhelm Koch-Hooge, Helga Göring	Drama	
1955
52 Wochen sind ein Jahr	Richard Groschopp	Hans Wehrl, Lotte Loebinger	Drama	
Die Dresdner Philharmoniker	Joachim Kunert		Documentary	
Einmal ist keinmal	Konrad Wolf	Horst Drinda, Brigitte Krause	Comedy	
Ernst Thälmann – Führer seiner Klasse	Kurt Maetzig	Günther Simon, Hans-Peter Minetti	Biography, drama	Second of a two-part fictionalized biography of Ernst Thälmann; lead actor Günther Simon won Best Actor at the 1956 Karlovy Vary International Film Festival for his appearance
Das Fräulein von Scuderi	Eugen York	Henny Porten, Willy A. Kleinau	Crime, drama	East German-Swedish co-production; based on E. T. A. Hoffmann's novella Mademoiselle de Scuderi
Hotelboy Ed Martin	Karlheinz Bieber, Ernst Kahler	Ulrich Thein, Katharina Matz	Drama	Based on Albert Maltz's play Merry-Go-Round
Der Kleine Häwelmann	Rolf Cichon		Animation, children's	Based on Theodor Storm's tale Der Kleine Häwelmann
Martins Tagebuch	Heiner Carow		Documentary, short	Won a Golden Dove at the 1956 International Leipzig Festival for Documentary and Animated Film
Mein Kind	Joris Ivens, Vladimir Pozner, Alfons Machalz		Documentary, short	
Mutter Courage und ihre Kinder	Wolfgang Staudte	Helene Weigel, Simone Signoret	Drama	Based on Bertolt Brecht's play Mutter Courage und ihre Kinder; unfinished
Der Ochse von Kulm	Martin Hellberg	Thea Aichbichler, Ferdinand Anton	Comedy	
Ein Polterabend	Curt Bois	Fredy Barten, Barbara Berg	Comedy	
Rauschende Melodien	E. W. Fiedler	Erich Arnold, Jarmila Ksírová	Operetta	Based on Johann Strauss II's operetta Die Fledermaus
Robert Mayer – der Arzt aus Heilbronn	Helmut Spieß	Emil Stöhr, Gisela Uhlen	Biography, drama	Fictionalized biography of Julius Robert Mayer
Sommerliebe	Franz Barrenstein	Ricarda Benndorf, Maria Besendahl	Comedy	
Star mit fremden Federn	Harald Mannl	Werner Peters, Sonja Sutter	Comedy	
Der Teufel vom Mühlenberg	Herbert Ballmann	Eva Kotthaus, Hans-Peter Minetti	Fantasy	
Der Verschenkte Leutnant	Wolfgang Luderer	Friedrich Teitge		Television film
Wer seine Frau lieb hat	Kurt Jung-Alsen	Albert Garbe, Leny Marenbach	Comedy	
Wohnkultur	Joe Münch-Harris		Documentary, short	
1956
Les Aventures de Till L'Espiègle	Gérard Philipe, Joris Ivens	Gérard Philipe, Jean Vilar	Adventure, comedy	French-East German co-production; based on Charles De Coster's novel The Legend of Thyl Ulenspiegel and Lamme Goedzak
Eine Berliner Romanze	Gerhard Klein	Annekathrin Bürger, Ulrich Thein	Drama, romance	
Besondere Kennzeichen: keine	Joachim Kunert	Erika Müller-Fürstenau, Christoph Engel	Drama	
Damals in Paris	Carl Balhaus	Gisela Trowe, Richard Lauffen	Drama	
Drei Mädchen im Endspiel	Kurt Jung-Alsen	Horst Naumann, Jochen Thomas	Comedy	
Du und mancher Kamerad	Andrew Thorndike, Annelie Thorndike		Documentary	Banned in West Germany
Eisetüde	Rolf Losansky		Short	
Die Fahrt nach Bamsdorf	Konrad Petzold	Erika Müller-Fürstenau, Charlotte Küter	Children's short	
Friedrich Schiller	Max Jaap		Documentary	Documentary about the life of Friedrich Schiller
Genesung	Konrad Wolf	Karla Runkehl, Wolfgang Kieling	Drama, romance	
Der Hauptmann von Köln	Slatan Dudow	Rolf Ludwig, Erwin Geschonneck	Comedy	
Heimliche Ehen	Gustav von Wangenheim	Paul Heidemann, Gerd Michael Henneberg	Comedy	
Junges Gemüse	Günter Reisch	Herbert Richter, Angela Brunner	Comedy	
Mich dürstet	Karl Paryla	Edwin Marian, Isabell Carenato	Drama, war	Based on Walter Gorrish's short story Um Spaniens Freiheit
Die Millionen der Yvette	Martin Hellberg	Josephine Back, Wolf Kaiser	Drama	
Mit Oswald in der Oper	Gottfried Kolditz	Günther Haack, Werner Berndt		
Der Richter von Zalamea	Martin Hellberg	Hans-Joachim Büttner, Gudrun Schmidt	Drama	Based on Pedro Calderón de la Barca's play The Mayor of Zalamea
Das Tapfere Schneiderlein	Helmut Spieß	Kurt Schmidtchen, Christel Bodenstein	Fantasy	Based on the German fairy tale The Brave Little Taylor
Der Teufelskreis	Carl Balhaus	Jochen Brockmann, Kurt Steingraf	Historical drama	
Thomas Müntzer	Martin Hellberg	Wolfgang Stumpf, Margarete Taudte	Biography, drama	Fictionalized biography of Thomas Müntzer
Das Traumschiff	Herbert Ballmann	Gisela Uhlen, Günther Simon	Children's	
Treffpunkt Aimée	Horst Reinecke	Renate Küster, Günther Simon	Crime	
Von nun ab, Herr Kunze	Gottfried Kolditz	Charlotte Brummerhoff, Norbert Christian	Short	
Zar und Zimmermann	Hans Müller	Willy A. Kleinau, Bert Fortell	Comedy, musical	Based on Albert Lortzing's opera Zar und Zimmermann
Zwischenfall in Benderath	János Veiczi	Uwe-Jens Pape, Inge Huber	Drama	
1957
Alter Kahn und junge Liebe	Hans Heinrich	Alfred Maack, Erika Dunkelmann	Romance	
An der Via Egnatia – Historisches und Heutiges über Stadt und Messe	Karl Gass		Documentary, short	
Berlin – Ecke Schönhauser	Gerhard Klein	Ekkehard Schall, Ilse Pagé	Crime	
Betrogen bis zum jüngsten Tag	Kurt Jung-Alsen	Rudolf Ulrich, Wolfgang Kieling	Drama	Entered into the 1957 Cannes Film Festival
Bärenburger Schnurre	Ralf Kirsten	Paul Heidemann, Axel Dietrich	Children's	
Der Fackelträger	Johannes Knittel	Hermann Kiessner, Loni Michelis	Drama	
Fridericus Rex – elfter Teil	Frank Beyer	Paul R. Henker, Heinz Kammer	Short	
Gejagt bis zum Morgen	Joachim Hasler	Manja Behrens, Raimund Schelcher	Drama	Based on Ludwig Turek's novel Ein Prolet erzählt
Hellas ohne Götter	Karl Gass		Documentary, short	
Katzgraben	Max Jaap, Manfred Wekwerth	Friedrich Gnaß, Angelika Hurwicz	Drama	Television film, based on the play Katzgraben by Erwin Strittmatter
Kindergymnastik	Rolf Losansky		Short	
Lissy	Konrad Wolf	Sonja Sutter, Horst Drinda	Drama	Based on Franz Carl Weiskopf's novel Die Versuchung
Mazurka der Liebe	Hans Müller	Bert Fortell, Albert Garbe	Operetta	Based on Carl Millöcker's operetta Der Bettelstudent
Polonia-Ekspreß	Kurt Jung-Alsen	Alice Graf, Horst Schön	Drama	
Rivalen am Steuer	Ernst Wilhelm Fiedler	Johannes Arpe, Hermann Belitz	Romance, sports	
Schlösser und Katen	Kurt Maetzig	Raimund Schelcher, Erika Dunkelmann	Drama	
Die Schönste	Ernesto Remani	Willy A. Kleinau, Ursula Burg	Drama	Banned and not shown publicly until 2002
Sheriff Teddy	Heiner Carow	Käte Alving, Rudolf Christoph	Children's	
Das singende, klingende Bäumchen	Francesco Stefani	Christel Bodenstein, Charles Hans Vogt	Children's	Purchased and shown as a television series in Great Britain by the BBC
Skimeister von morgen	Ralf Kirsten	Rainer Brettschneider, Eberhard Gast	Drama, sports	
Les Sorcières de Salem	Raymond Rouleau	Simone Signoret, Yves Montand	Historical drama	French-East German co-production; based on Arthur Miller's play The Crucible
Spielbank-Affäre	Arthur Pohl	Gertrud Kückelmann, Jan Hendriks	Crime	East German-Swedish co-production
Spur in die Nacht	Günter Reisch	Annekathrin Bürger, Kurt Dunkelmann	Drama	
Tanz in der Galerie	Gottfried Kolditz	Wolf Kaiser, Liselotte Köster	Short	
Tinko	Herbert Ballmann	Josef Sieber, Lisa Wehn	Drama	
Vergeßt mir meine Traudel nicht	Kurt Maetzig	Eva-Maria Hagen, Horst Kube	Comedy	
Die Windrose	Joris Ivens, Yannick Bellon, Alberto Cavalcanti, Sergei Gerasimov, Gillo Pontecorvo, Alex Viany	Yves Montand, Simone Signoret	Docudrama	
Wo Du hin gehst	Martin Hellberg	Wolfgang Stumpf, Gisela Trowe	Historical drama, romance	
Zwei Mütter	Frank Beyer	Françoise Spira, Helga Göring	Drama, war	
Zwischen Himmel und Erde	Karl Gass		Documentary, short	
1958
Abenteuer in Bamsdorf	Konrad Petzold	Charlotte Küter, Bernd Kuss	Adventure, children's	
Sonnensucher	Konrad Wolf	Ulrike Germer, Günther Simon	Drama	Banned and not shown publicly until 1972
Emilia Galotti	Martin Hellberg	Karin Hübner, Hans-Peter Thielen	Historical drama, romance	Based on Gotthold Ephraim Lessing's play Emilia Galotti
Die Feststellung	Herbert Fischer	William Adelt, Ilse Bastubbe	Drama	
Fiete im Netz	Siegfried Hartmann	Ulrike Brunn, Peter Festersen	Children's	
Geschichte vom armen Hassan	Gerhard Klein	Ekkehard Schall, Erwin Geschonneck	Children's	
Geschwader Fledermaus	Erich Engel	Wolfgang Heinz, Christine Laszar	Drama, war	
Insel der Rosen	Karl Gass		Documentary, short	
Klotz am Bein	Frank Vogel	Horst Drinda, Christel Bodenstein	Comedy	
Das Lied der Matrosen	Kurt Maetzig, Günter Reisch	Hilmar Trate, Raimund Schelcher	Historical drama	Entered into the 1st Moscow International Film Festival
Der Lotterieschwede	Joachim Kunert	Erwin Geschonneck, Sonja Sutter	Drama	Based on Martin Andersen Nexø's novella Lotterisvensken
Meine Frau macht Musik	Hans Heinrich	Lore Fritsch, Günther Simon	Musical	
Les Misérables	Jean-Paul Le Chanois	Jean Gabin, Bernard Blier	Drama	French-East German-Italian co-production; based on Victor Hugo's novel Les Misérables
Die Mutter	Manfred Wekwerth	Helene Weigel, Fred Düren	Drama	Based on Maxim Gorky's novel Mother
Ein Mädchen von 16 ½	Carl Balhaus	Nana Osten, Hartmut Reck	Drama	
Nur eine Frau	Carl Balhaus	Karla Runkehl, Rudolf Grabow	Biography, drama	Fictionalized biography of Louise Otto-Peters
Piloten, Propeller und Turbinen	Jürgen Thierlein		Documentary, short	
Der Prozeß wird vertagt	Herbert Ballmann	Raimund Schelcher, Gerhard Bienert	Drama	
Reifender Sommer	Horst Reinecke	Willy A. Kleinau, Gisela Uhlen	Drama	
Rocník 21	Václav Gajer	Eva Kotthaus, Luděk Munzar	Drama	
Sie kannten sich alle	Richard Groschopp	Horst Drinda, Sonja Sutter	Crime	
Tatort Berlin	Joachim Kunert	Hartmut Reck, Annegret Golding	Crime	
Tilman Riemenschneider	Helmut Spieß	Emil Stöhr, Gerd Michael Henneberg	Biography	Fictionalized biography of Tilman Riemenschneider
Unternehmen Teutonenschwert	Andrew Thorndike, Annelie Thorndike		Documentary	
1959
10 Jahre DDR in Filmdokumenten 1949–1959	Bruno Kleberg		Documentary	
Alte Liebe, Eine	Frank Beyer	Gisela May, Erich Franz	Drama	
Bevor der Blitz einschlägt	Richard Groschopp	Christine Lazar, Horst Drinda	Comedy	
Brücke zwischen gestern und morgen	Fred Mahr	Antje Ruge, Rudolf Ulrich	Drama	Television film
Claudia	Walter Beck	Maria Besendahl, Erich Fritze	Drama	
Die Dame und der Blinde	Hans-Erich Korbschmitt	Albert Hetterle, Inge Keller		Television film
Das Feuerzeug	Siegfried Hartmann	Rolf Ludwig, Heinz Schubert	Fantasy	
Ehesache Lorenz	Joachim Kunert	Manja Behrens, Martin Flörchinger	Drama	
Erich Kubak	Karl Plintzner	Helga Göring, Hans-Edgar Stecher	Drama	
Im Sonderauftrag	Heinz Thiel	Hans-Peter Minetti, Rolf Ludwig	Adventure	
Zu jeder Stunde	Heinz Thiel	Rolf Stövesand, Erika Radtke	Drama	Released in 1960
Kabale und Liebe	Martin Hellberg	Wolf Kaiser, Otto Mellies	Historical drama	Based on Friedrich Schiller's play Intrigue and Love
Kapitäne bleiben an Bord	Martin Hellberg	Johannes Arpe, Christel Bodenstein	Adventure	
Der Kleine Kuno	Kurt Jung-Alsen	Margit Schaumäker, Rudolf Ulrich	Children's	
Maibowle	Günter Reisch	Erich Franz, Albert Hetterle	Comedy	
Martin Andersen Nexö	Joachim Kunert		Documentary, short	
Musterknaben	Johannes Knittel	Hartmut Reck, Rolf Herricht	Romantic comedy	
Natürlich die Nelli	Konrad Petzold	Evamaria Bath, Wolfgang Lippert	Children's	
Die Premiere fällt aus	Kurt Jung-Alsen	Christine Laszar, Hans Geissler	Crime	
Reportage 57	János Veiczi	Annekathrin Bürger, Willi Schrade	Drama	
SAS 181 antwortet nicht	Carl Balhaus	Ulrich Thein, Otmar Richter	Adventure	
Senta auf Abwegen	Martin Hellberg	Günther Simon, Karin Buchali		
Sie nannten ihn Amigo	Heiner Carow	Ernst-Georg Schwill, Angelica Hurwicz	Historical drama	
Simplon-Tunnel	Gottfried Kolditz	Johannes Arpe, Brigitte Krause	Drama	
Soldat und Sportler	Rolf Losansky		Short	
Sterne	Konrad Wolf	Sasha Krusharska, Jürgen Frohriep		Bulgarian-East German co-production; won the Special Jury Prize at the 1959 Cannes Film Festival
Die Stiere des Hidalgo	Karl Gass		Documentary, short	
Der verlorene Ball	Kurt Weiler	Erika Dunkelmann, Uschi Wenske	Children's, short	
Verwirrung der Liebe	Slatan Dudow	Angelica Domröse, Annekathrin Bürger	Romantic comedy	
Vom mutigen Hans	Katja Georgi, Klaus Georgi		Animation, short	
Ware für Katalonien	Richard Groschopp	Wilfried Ortmann, Fritz Diez	Crime	
Weißes Blut	Gottfried Kolditz	Christine Laszar, Jürgen Frohriep	Drama	
Wie die Wilden	Ruth Heucke-Langenscheidt	Jutta Auerbach, Brigitte Krause		Television film

== 1960s ==
Title	Director	Cast	Genre	Notes
1960
Daß ein gutes Deutschland blühe	Joop Huiske			
Die Flucht aus der Hölle	Hans-Erich Korbschmitt			
Fünf Patronenhülsen	Frank Beyer			
Five Days, Five Nights	Leo Arnschtam, Heinz Thiel			
Hatifa	Siegfried Hartmann			
Hochmut kommt vor dem Knall	Kurt Jung-Alsen			
Kein Ärger mit Cleopatra	Helmut Schneider			
Die schöne Lurette	Gottfried Kolditz			
Schritt für Schritt	János Veiczi			
Seilergasse 8	Joachim Kunert			
Was wäre, wenn...?	Gerhard Klingenberg			
Wo der Zug nicht lange hält...	Joachim Hasler			
Ärzte	Lutz Köhlert			
Alwin der Letzte	Hubert Hoelzke			
Der Schweigende Stern	Kurt Maetzig		science fiction	
1961
Das Kleid	Konrad Petzold			
Der Arzt von Bothenow	Johannes Knittel			
Der Fall Gleiwitz	Gerhard Klein			
Die Liebe und der Co-Pilot	Richard Groschopp			
Flitterwochen ohne Ehemann	Helmut Spieß			
Mutter Courage und ihre Kinder	Peter Palitzsch			Prize at the Locarno Festival
Professor Mamlock	Konrad Wolf			Entered into the 2nd Moscow International Film Festival
Der Schwur des Soldaten Pooley	Kurt Jung-Alsen	Garfield Morgan, Andrew Ray, Ferdy Mayne	War	
Schneewittchen und die sieben Zwerge	Gottfried Kolditz			
Septemberliebe	Kurt Maetzig			
1962
Das verhexte Fischerdorf	Siegfried Hartmann			
Ach du fröhliche...	Günter Reisch			
Auf der Sonnenseite	Ralf Kirsten			
Christine und die Störche	Jirí Jahn			
Freispruch mangels Beweises	Richard Groschopp			
Das grüne Ungeheuer	Rudi Kurz			
Die Jagd nach dem Stiefel	Konrad Petzold			
Minna von Barnhelm	Martin Hellberg			
Rotkäppchen	Götz Friedrich			
Schaut auf diese Stadt	Karl Gass			
Revue um Mitternacht	Gottfried Kolditz		Musical comedy	
1963
Beschreibung eines Sommers	Ralf Kirsten			
For Eyes Only	János Veiczi			
Frau Holle	Gottfried Kolditz			
Die Glatzkopfbande	Richard Groschopp			
Die Hochzeit von Länneken	Heiner Carow			
Geheimarchiv an der Elbe	Kurt Jung-Alsen			
Reserviert für den Tod	Heinz Thiel			
Karbid und Sauerampfer	Frank Beyer			
Nackt unter Wölfen	Frank Beyer			Entered into the 3rd Moscow International Film Festival
1964
Engel im Fegefeuer	Herrmann Zschoche			
Das Lied vom Trompeter	Konrad Petzold			
Geliebte weiße Maus	Gottfried Kolditz			
Der Geteilte Himmel	Konrad Wolf			
Die Goldene Gans	Siegfried Hartmann			
Viel Lärm um nichts	Martin Hellberg			
1965
Ohne Pass in fremden Betten	Vladimir Brebera			
Denk bloß nicht, ich heule				
Der Reserveheld	Wolfgang Luderer			
Die antike Münze	Wladimir Jantschew			
Entlassen auf Bewährung	Richard Groschopp			
Karl Liebknecht – Solange Leben in mir ist.	Günter Reisch	Horst Schulze		
Die Abenteuer des Werner Holt	Joachim Kunert			Entered into the 4th Moscow International Film Festival
Chronik eines Mordes	Joachim Hasler			
Das Kaninchen bin ich	Kurt Maetzig			
1966
Alfons Zitterbacke	Konrad Petzold			
Born in '45	Jürgen Böttcher			Released 1990
Elf Jahre alt	Winfried Junge			
Flucht ins Schweigen	Siegfried Hartmann			
Der Frühling braucht Zeit	Günter Stahnke			
Hands Up or I'll Shoot	Hans-Joachim Kasprzik			Released 2009
Der lachende Mann – Bekenntnisse eines Mörders	Walter Heynowski			
Reise ins Ehebett	Joachim Hasler			
Spur der Steine	Frank Beyer			
Das Tal der sieben Monde	Gottfried Kolditz			
1967
Der tapfere Schulschwänzer	Winfried Junge			
Brot und Rosen	Horst E. Brandt, Heinz Thiel			Entered into the 5th Moscow International Film Festival
Chingachgook, die große Schlange	Richard Groschopp			
Die Fahne von Kriwoj Rog	Kurt Maetzig			
Frau Venus und ihr Teufel	Ralf Kirsten			
Frozen Flashes	János Veiczi			
Die Heiden von Kummerow und ihre lustigen Streiche	Werner Jacobs			Co-production with West Germany
Heißer Sommer	Joachim Hasler			
Heroin	Horst E. Brandt, Heinz Thiel			
Hochzeitsnacht im Regen	Horst Seemann			
Ein Lord am Alexanderplatz	Günter Reisch			
Das Mädchen auf dem Brett	Kurt Maetzig			
Meine Freundin Sybille	Wolfgang Luderer			
1968
Abschied	Egon Günther			
Hauptmann Florian von der Mühle	Werner W. Wallroth			
Käuzchenkuhle	Walter Beck			
Leben zu zweit	Herrmann Zschoche			
Das siebente Jahr	Frank Vogel			
Spur des Falken	Gottfried Kolditz			
Pilots in Pajamas	Walter Heynowski; Gerhard Scheumann		Documentary	
Mord am Montag	Hans Kratzert	Barbara Brylska, Horst Schulze, Helga Göring	Crime	
1969
Weil ich dich liebe...	Helmut Brandis, Hans Kratzert			
Weiße Wölfe	Konrad Petzold			
Weite Straßen – stille Liebe	Herrmann Zschoche			
Zeit zu leben	Horst Seemann			
Seine Hoheit – Genosse Prinz	Werner W. Wallrot			
Netzwerk	Ralf Kirsten			
Im Spannungsfeld	Siegfried Kühn			
Jungfer, Sie gefällt mir	Günter Reisch			
He, Du!	Rolf Römer			
Hart am Wind	Heinz Thiel			
Du bist min (Ein deutsches Tagebuch)	Andrew Thorndike, Annelie Thorndike		Documentary	Entered into the 6th Moscow International Film Festival

== 1970s ==
Title	Director	Cast	Genre	Notes
1970
Dr. med. Sommer II	Lothar Warneke			
Effi Briest	Wolfgang Luderer			
Goya (Der arge Weg der Erkenntnis)	Konrad Wolf			Entered into the 7th Moscow International Film Festival
Kennen Sie Urban?	Ingrid Reschke			
Tödlicher Irrtum	Konrad Petzold			
Wir kaufen eine Feuerwehr	Hans Kratzert			
Meine Stunde Null	Joachim Hasler			
1971
Anflug Alpha 1	János Veiczi			
Hut ab, wenn du küßt!	Rolf Losansky			
Zeit der Störche	Siegfried Kühn			
Osceola	Konrad Petzold			
Der Mann, der nach der Oma kam	Roland Oehme			
1972
Der Dritte	Egon Günther			
Karl Liebknecht – Trotz alledem!	Günter Reisch	Horst Schulze		
Die Elixiere des Teufels	Ralf Kirsten			
Eolomea	Herrmann Zschoche			
Januskopf	Kurt Maetzig			
Laut und leise ist die Liebe	Helmut Dziuba			
Die Schlüssel	Egon Günther			
The Stolen Battle	Erwin Stranka	Manfred Krug		
Florentiner 73	Klaus Gendries			
Es ist eine alte Geschichte	Lothar Warneke			
Tecumseh	Hans Kratzert	Gojko Mitić, Annekathrin Bürger	Western	
1973
Apachen	Gottfried Kolditz			
Excerpts from the Life of a Good-For-Nothing	Celino Bleiweiß	Dean Reed, Anna Dymna, Hannelore Elsner, Monika Woytowicz, Gerry Wolff, Christel Bodenstein, Aimée Iacobescu	Comedy	
Reife Kirschen	Horst Seemann			Entered into the 8th Moscow International Film Festival
Three Wishes for Cinderella	Václav Vorlíček	Libuše Šafránková, Pavel Trávníček	fairy-tale	Czechoslovak-East German co-production
Wie füttert man einen Esel	Roland Oehme			
Wolz – Leben und Verklärung eines deutschen Anarchisten	Günter Reisch			
Unterm Birnbaum	Ralf Kirsten			
The Legend of Paul and Paula	Heiner Carow			
1974
Kit & Co	Konrad Petzold			
Leben mit Uwe	Lothar Warneke			
Ulzana	Gottfried Kolditz			
Zum Beispiel Josef	Erwin Stranka			
Looping	Kurt Tetzlaff			
Für die Liebe noch zu mager?	Bernhard Stephan			
1975
Blood Brothers	Werner W. Wallroth	Dean Reed, Gojko Mitic	Western	
Jacob the Liar	Frank Beyer	Vlastimil Brodský		Brodský won the Silver Bear for Best Actor at Berlin; Nominated for the Academy Award for Best Foreign Language Film
Die Moral der Banditen	Erwin Stranka			
Eine Pyramide für mich	Ralf Kirsten			
Between Day and Night	Horst E. Brandt			Entered into the 9th Moscow International Film Festival
1976
Unterwegs nach Atlantis	Siegfried Kühn			
Nelken in Aspik	Günter Reisch			
Liebesfallen	Werner W. Wallroth			
Die Leiden des jungen Werthers	Egon Günther			
1977
The Incorrigible Barbara	Lothar Warneke			Entered into the 10th Moscow International Film Festival
Mama, I'm Alive	Konrad Wolf			Entered into the 27th Berlin International Film Festival
1978
Anton the Magician	Günter Reisch			Entered into the 11th Moscow International Film Festival
Asya	Iosif Kheifits	Elena Koreneva	Drama	Soviet-East German co-production
Sabine Wulff	Erwin Stranka			
Sieben Sommersprossen	Herrmann Zschoche			
Ursula	Egon Günther	Suzanne Stoll, Jörg Reichlin, Matthias Habich, Jutta Hoffmann	Drama	East German-Swiss co-production
Zünd an, es kommt die Feuerwehr	Rainer Simon			
Jörg Ratgeb – Painter	Bernhard Stephan			Entered into the 28th Berlin International Film Festival
1979
Feuer unter Deck	Herrmann Zschoche			Produced 1977, released 1979

== 1980s ==
Title	Director	Cast	Genre	Notes
1980
Glück im Hinterhaus	Herrmann Zschoche			
Jadup and Boel	Rainer Simon			Entered into the 16th Moscow International Film Festival
Levins Mühle	Horst Seemann			
Pugowitza	Jürgen Brauer			
Solo Sunny	Konrad Wolf, Wolfgang Kohlhaase	Renate Krößner		Krößner won the Silver Bear for Best Actress at Berlin
Und nächstes Jahr am Balaton	Herrmann Zschoche			
1981
Bürgschaft für ein Jahr	Herrmann Zschoche	Katrin Saß		Saß won the Silver Bear for Best Actress at Berlin
Die fliegende Windmühle	Günter Rätz			
Mephisto	István Szabó	Klaus Maria Brandauer, Rolf Hoppe, Krystyna Janda, Karin Boyd		Hungarian-East German-West German-Austrian co-production
Our Short Life	Lothar Warneke			Entered into the 12th Moscow International Film Festival
Sing, Cowboy, sing	Dean Reed			
1982
Die Gerechten von Kummerow	Wolfgang Luderer			
Insel der Schwäne	Herrmann Zschoche			
Der lange Ritt zur Schule	Rolf Losansky			
Der Prinz hinter den sieben Meeren	Walter Beck			
Romance with Amelie	Ulrich Thein			Entered into the 32nd Berlin International Film Festival
Sabine Kleist, 7 Jahre...	Helmut Dziuba			
Sonjas Rapport	Bernhard Stephan			
1983
Erscheinen Pflicht	Helmut Dziuba			
Moritz in der Litfaßsäule	Christa Kozik, Rolf Losansky			
The Turning Point	Frank Beyer	Sylvester Groth		
Die vertauschte Königin	Dieter Scharfenberg			
Zille and Me	Werner W. Wallroth			Entered into the 13th Moscow International Film Festival
1984
Ab heute erwachsen	Gunther Scholz			
Bockshorn	Frank Beyer			
Hälfte des Lebens	Herrmann Zschoche			
Isabel auf der Treppe	Hannelore Unterberg			
Eine sonderbare Liebe	Lothar Warneke			
A Village Romeo and Juliet	Siegfried Kühn			
Wo andere schweigen	Ralf Kirsten			Entered into the 14th Moscow International Film Festival
Woman Doctors	Horst Seemann	Judy Winter		
1985
Atkins	Helge Trimpert			
Ete und Ali	Peter Kahane			
Die Gänse von Bützow	Frank Vogel			
Grünstein's Clever Move	Bernhard Wicki	Fred Düren, Klaus Schwarzkopf, Jörg Gudzuhn, Rolf Hoppe	Drama	West German-East German co-production
Der Haifischfütterer	Erwin Stranka			
Junge Leute in der Stadt	Karl Heinz Lotz			
The Woman and the Stranger	Rainer Simon			Won the Golden Bear at Berlin
1986
Fahrschule	Bernhard Stephan			
The House on the River	Roland Gräf			Entered into the 36th Berlin International Film Festival
So Many Dreams	Heiner Carow			Entered into the 37th Berlin International Film Festival
Wie die Alten sungen	Günter Reisch			
1987
Die Alleinseglerin	Herrmann Zschoche			
Die Entfernung zwischen dir und mir und ihr	Michael Kann			
Sansibar oder der letzte Grund	Bernhard Wicki	Peter Kremer, Michael Gwisdek, Peter Sodann	Drama	a.k.a. Flight to Afar. East German-West German co-production
Das Schulgespenst	Rolf Losansky			
Vernehmung der Zeugen	Gunther Scholz			Entered into the 15th Moscow International Film Festival
Vorspiel	Peter Kahane			
1988
Bear Ye One Another's Burden	Lothar Warneke	Manfred Möck, Jörg Pose		Möck and Pose won the Silver Bear for Best Actor at Berlin
Fallada: The Last Chapter	Roland Gräf			Entered into the 39th Berlin International Film Festival
1989
Die Besteigung des Chimborazo	Rainer Simon	Jan Josef Liefers		East German-West German co-production
Ein brauchbarer Mann	Hans-Werner Honert			
The Break	Frank Beyer	Götz George, Rolf Hoppe, Otto Sander		East German-West German co-production
Coming Out	Heiner Carow	Matthias Freihof, Dirk Kummer, Dagmar Manzel		Won the Silver Bear at the 40th Berlin International Film Festival
Grüne Hochzeit	Herrmann Zschoche			
Pestalozzi's Mountain	Peter von Gunten	Gian Maria Volonté		East German-Swiss co-production. Entered into the 39th Berlin International Film Festival
Treffen in Travers	Michael Gwisdek	Hermann Beyer, Corinna Harfouch, Uwe Kockisch		Screened in the Un Certain Regard section at the 1989 Cannes Film Festival
Zum Teufel mit Harbolla	Bodo Fürneisen		Comedy	Set in 1956
1990
The Dancer	Masahiro Shinoda	Hiromi Go, Lisa Wolf, Brigitte Grothum	Drama	Japanese-West German-East German co-production
Die Architekten	Peter Kahane	Kurt Naumann		
Little Herr Friedemann	Peter Vogel	Ulrich Mühe	Drama	
The Trace Leads to the Silver Lake	Günter Rätz	—N/a	Animated	
Verbotene Liebe	Helmut Dziuba	Julia Brendler, Hans-Peter Dahm		

== See also ==
- Cinema of Germany
- Culture of East Germany
- DEFA (film studio)
- DEFA Film Library
- Film censorship in East Germany
- List of German submissions for the Academy Award for Best International Feature Film#East Germany
- Lists of German films
- Ostern (Eastern-bloc Westerns)
