= Rudolf Ulrich =

German actor (1922–1997)

- Born: 3 January 1922; Halle, Saxony-Anhalt, Germany
- Died: 4 April 1997 (aged 75); Berlin, Germany
- Occupation: Actor
- Years active: 1954–1986

Rudolf Ulrich (3 January 1922 – 4 April 1997) was a German film actor. He appeared in 67 films between 1954 and 1986. He died in Berlin at age 75.

== Filmography ==
Year	Title	Role	Notes
1954	Gefährliche Fracht	Schuster	
1955	Star mit fremden Federn	Gustav, woodcutter	
1956	Drei Mädchen im Endspiel	Erich Lange	
1956	Genesung	Britischer Sergeant	Uncredited
1957	Duped Till Doomsday	Obergefreiter Wagner Karl	
1957	Polonia-Express	Althoff	
1957	Die Schönste		
1958	Tatort Berlin	Walter Prange	
1958	Rocník 21	Hill	
1959	Die Premiere fällt aus	Hauptmann Jentsch	
1959	Kapitäne bleiben an Bord	Kurt Kars	
1959	Der kleine Kuno	Kunos Vater	
1959	SAS 181 Does Not Reply		
1959	Ehesache Lorenz	Kurt Lemke	
1959	An Old Love	Georg	
1959	Brücke zwischen gestern und morgen	Hans Gutweil	TV Movie
1960	Die Entscheidung des Dr. Ahrendt	Martin Kröger	
1960	Seilergasse 8	Herbert Zallner	
1960	Die heute über 40 sind	Georg Weidtlich	
1960	Sommerwege	LPG-Vorsitzender Schindel	
1961	Die Liebe und der Co-Pilot	Kretzschmar	
1961	Der Fremde	Julius	
1961	Eine Handvoll Noten	Herbert Stracke	
1961	Urlaub ohne Dich	Heinrich	
1962	Tanz am Sonnabend	Fritz Gäbler	
1962	Mord ohne Sühne	Heinrich Blöcker	
1963	Geheimarchiv an der Elbe		
1964	Schwarzer Samt	Oberleutnant Wohlfahrt	
1964	Viel Lärm Um Nichts	Schleewein	
1964	Als Martin vierzehn war	Dr. Brandt	
1965	The Adventures of Werner Holt		
1965	Terra incognita	Mahlzahn	
1965	KTiefe Furchen	Göttermann	
1965	The Rabbit Is Me	Fischer Grambow	
1965	Berlin um die Ecke	Kranführer	
1966	Bumerang	Starszy turysta	
1967	Geschichten jener Nacht	Karl	(segment "Der grosse und der kleine Willi")
1967	Chingachgook, die große Schlange	Englischer Corporal	
1967	The Banner of Krivoi Rog	Nachbar Bienert	
1968	Die Nacht im Grenzwald	Father Klose	
1969	Seine Hoheit – Genosse Prinz	Sebastian	
1970	Hart am Wind	Kapitän Bärwald	
1971	KLK Calling PTZ – The Red Orchestra	Franz Gauss	
1972	Tecumseh	O'Brian	
1974	Otpisani	Standartenführer Müller	
1975	Between Day and Night	Peter	
1977	Osvobození Prahy		
1977	Ein Katzensprung	Oberst Strauch	
1978	Povratak otpisanih	Standartenführer Müller	
1979	Für Mord kein Beweis	VP-Hauptwachtmeister Handtke	
1981	Die Stunde der Töchter	Wolff	
1981	Die Kolonie	Heimleiter Giese	
1984	Der Mann mit dem Ring im Ohr		
1984	Der Lude	Wirt von Baehr	
1985	Meine Frau Inge und meine Frau Schmidt	BGLer	
1985	Der Doppelgänger	Pförtner	
1986	Startfieber	Opa Feurich	
1986	Der Hut des Brigadiers	Heides Vater	
1989	Vernymi ostanemsya	Vater Schneider	
1990	Der Streit um des Esels Schatten	Theophanos	
