= Raimund Schelcher =

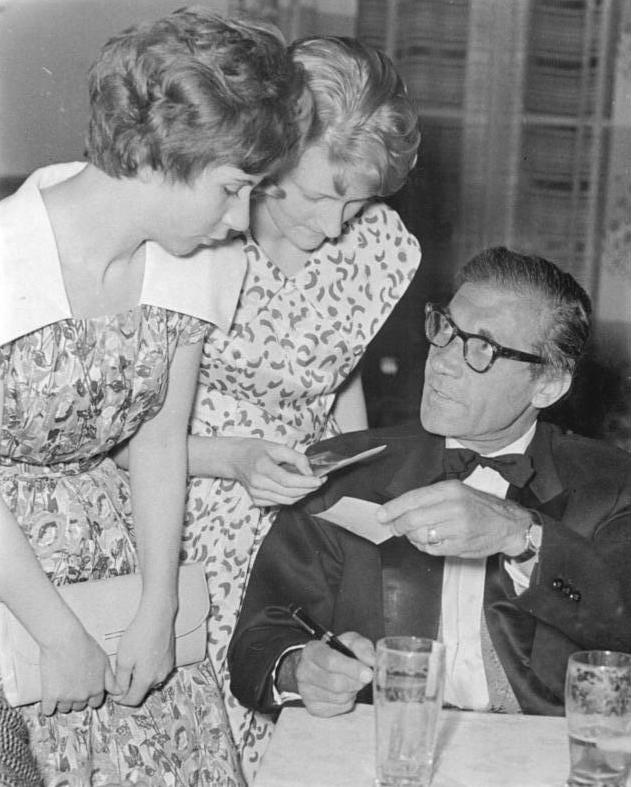
- Raimund Schelcher (right) in 1960
- Born: 27 March 1910; Dar es Salaam, German East Africa
- Died: 27 March 1972 (age 62); East Berlin, East Germany
- Occupation: actor
- Years active: 1937-1971
- Spouse(s): Lore Hansen; Annalise Wanckel

Raimund Schelcher (27 March 1910 – 27 March 1972) was a Tanzanian actor who appeared in over 43 films and television programs between 1939 and 1971.

== Personal life ==
He was born in Dar es Salaam, German East Africa (now Tanzania) to a railway engineer and a violinist. When Schelcher was fourteen, his family were evacuated to Germany after World War I. Between 1924 and 1928 he visited the Oberrealschule Kalk in Cologne. After earning a Mittlere Reife and after leaving school he entered the theatre. From 1928 to 1938 he took acting lessons at the Municipal drama school in Cologne.

He died on his 62nd birthday in Berlin on 27 March 1972.

== Career ==
In 1930 he debuted his role as Ferdinand in Intrigue and Love at the Theater Gießen. In 1933 Schelcher joined the New Theatre in Frankfurt am Main and in 1934-1935 he played at the Deutsches Schauspielhaus in Hamburg, from 1935 to 1938 in Leipzig and finally at the Schiller Theater in Berlin. In 1939 he received his first film roles.

=== World War II ===
He was drafted shortly before World War II on 28 August 1939 by the Gestapo. He was drafted as a soldier and was "probation battalion assigned". In battle, he was wounded four times and he fell into Soviet captivity. After his release he resumed his career at the Stadttheater in Bremen.

=== Return to Acting ===
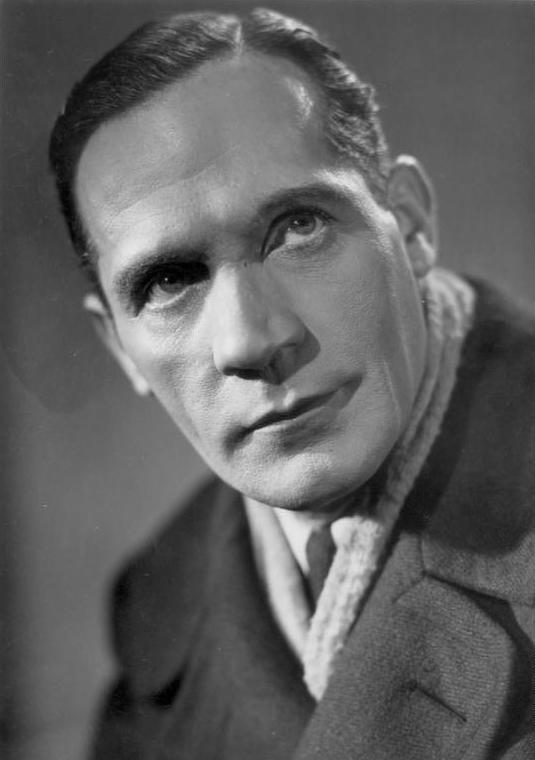
Schelcher in 1951

In 1950 he went to the eastern part of Berlin's Deutsches Theater and performed at the Volksbühne. From 1953 he worked at the Berliner Ensemble. Schlecher played, among others, the fool in the Twelfth Night, Jakob in Gorkis and Simon Chachava in The Caucasian Chalk Circle. Schelcher worked in the 1950s as a DEFA actor. He was helped by his clear-cut features. He appeared in films featuring ideal class-conscious proletarians as in two of Thalmann's movies or as the understanding people's commissar in Berlin, Schoenhauser Corner.

== Filmography ==
Year	Title	Role	Notes
1939	The Immortal Heart	Konrad Windhalm	
1939	Robert Koch	Kochs Assistent Dr. Fritz von Hartwig	
1939	Der letzte Appell	Walter Brodersen	
1950	0 Uhr 15, Zimmer 9	Martin Leutner	
1950	The Axe of Wandsbek	Karl Prestow	
1951	The Sonnenbrucks	Dozent Joachim Peters	
1951	Der Untertan	Dr. Wolfgang Buck	
1953	Geheimakten Solvay	Mertens	
1954	Ernst Thälmann	Krischan Daik	
1954	Der Fall Dr. Wagner	Erich Rückert	
1954	Leuchtfeuer	Betrunkener Matrose	
1955	Der Ochse von Kulm	Heckenberger	
1955	Wer seine Frau lieb hat	Jochen Schall	
1955	Ernst Thälmann	Krischan Daik	
1956	The Mayor of Zalamea	Sergeant	
1957	Castles and Cottages	Krummer Anton	
1957	Lissy	Max Franke	
1957	Wo Du hin gehst	Albert	
1957	Berlin, Schoenhauser Corner	VP-Kommissar	
1957	Spur in die Nacht	Mann mit Lederjacke	
1957	Gejagt bis zum Morgen	Karl Baumann	
1958	Rocník 21	Weiß	
1958	Der Prozeß wird vertagt	Michael Vierkant	
1958	The Sailor's Song	August Lenz	
1959	Erich Kubak	Erich Kubak	
1960	Das Leben beginnt	Direktor Gruber	
1960	Schritt für Schritt	Dreher Rochlitz	
1961	Pyat dney - pyat nochey		
1961	Der Arzt von Bothenow	Parteisekretär Karl Lange	
1962	Die schwarze Galeere	König Philipp II von Spanien	
1962	Entdeckung des Julian Böll		
1962	Die Jagd nach dem Stiefel	Julius Gemse	
1963	At A French Fireside	Ludovic	
1967	Geschichten jener Nacht	Painter	(segment "Phönix")
1972	Trotz alledem!		(final film role)

== Recognition ==
- Medal of Merit of the National People's Army in silver step by step
- National Prize of East Germany for his role as Fritzweiler in piece woman Flinz
