= Geheimarchiv an der Elbe =

1963 film

- Directed by: Kurt Jung-Alsen
- Written by: Peter Brock, based on a novel by Alexander Nassibow Drehbuch
- Starring: Hans-Peter Minetti, Albert Hetterle and Günther Simon.
- Cinematography: Peter Krause
- Edited by: Lottie Mehnert
- Music by: André Asriel
- Distributed by: DEFA
- Release date: 18 April 1963
- Running time: 94 minutes
- Country: East Germany
- Language: German

Geheimarchiv an der Elbe (Secret Archive on the Elbe) is an East German war film set in the last days of World War II in Europe and directed by Kurt Jung-Alsen. It stars Hans-Peter Minetti, Albert Hetterle and Günther Simon. Based on a novel by Alexander Nassibow Drehbuch, it was released in 1963. The film follows the exploits of a Soviet communist officer, Major Kerimov (Minetti), who is sent to recover a Secret Archive from the Nazis. The film was Jung-Alsen's last film for DEFA.

== Plot ==
Shortly before the end of the Second World War: SS-Gruppenführer Upitz knows that Germany has lost the war. He tries to give himself an advantage for the time after the war and accepts an offer from the Americans. He receives immunity from prosecution if, in return, he hands over to them the Gestapo's secret archive, which is hidden on the Elbe River in Meissen. It contains the data of all agents placed by the Gestapo in the Soviet Union and the Balkans. The Soviet Abwehrdienst is also after this data, so Upitz wants to lay a false trail.

Upitz has the welder Max Wiesbach taken to an underground tunnel in Riesa in order to seal a leak under water. Wiesbach is convinced that he has sealed a leak in the secret archive and passes this information on to a staunch communist who is sent to the Soviet front a short time later and defects to the Russians there. He tells them about the secret archive in Riesa, but the Russians believe the secret archive is in Meissen. They want certainty. Together with Herbert Lange from Riesa, the Soviet Major Kerimov is sent to Riesa to locate the secret archive. Lange's wife believes her husband to be dead. When he suddenly appears at the door and announces that he will soon have to leave again, Mrs. Lange becomes hysterical. Lange wants to get a doctor, but is shot in the street as an apparent fugitive. Kerimov is now on his own. He receives help from staunch communists and is hired as a driver in the factory where Max Wiesbach works as a welder. Kerimov soon finds out that Wiesbach's testimony is fake and that the secret archive must be in Meissen.

Meanwhile, Upitz has reached an agreement with the American Tedder to hand over the archive to the Americans in the next few days. Tedder informs a middleman who is to organize and supervise the removal. Upitz and the middleman each receive a comb half as an identification mark. Kerimov eavesdrops on their conversations and acquires the middleman's comb piece. His communist supporters make arrangements for the arrival and departure of a camouflaged Soviet cargo plane. He gets in touch with Upitz and supervises the transfer of the archive files to the plane. Upitz boards the plane, as he had arranged with Tedder. When they are in the air, Upitz casually inquires where exactly they are headed. When Kerimov replies that the flight is going to Moscow, Upitz reacts at first amused, believing this is a joke, and then remains speechless.

== Cast ==
- Hans-Peter Minetti as Major Kerimov
- Albert Hetterle as Oberst Rybin
- Günther Simon as SS-Gruppenführer Upitz
- Hans-Joachim Martens as Standartenführer Bolm
- Günther Haack as Sturmführer Torp
- Alfred Struw as Adjutant von Upitz
- Johannes Arpe as Kümetz
- Rudolf Ulrich as Herbert Lange

== Production ==
The film was shot by cinematographer Peter Krause, with a screenplay by Peter Brock. The film score was composed by André Asriel.

== Release and reception ==
Geheimarchiv an der Elbe premiered on 18 April 1963. The film was described by author Bernard Stöver as "Eastern propaganda".
