= Baltics (band) =

Baltics (originally Baltic Quintet) was a German beat band from Rostock, who were especially well known in the north of the GDR. The band was formed in 1964 by members of the already well-known group Trio 63 in Rostock. The original Beat Quartett members were Wolfgang Ziegler (bandleader, guitar, vocals and piano), Wolfgang Fennel (guitar), Eckhardt Woytowicz (tenor saxophone, alto saxophone, clarinet, flute, guitar) and Hans-Joachim Seering (drums); the group made their first television appearances with this line-up, including "Herzklopfen kostenlos" moderated by Heinz Quermann. The band made a brief performance in the children's film "Reise nach Sundevit" in 1965 and at the request of director Heiner Carow recorded the entire soundtrack in Babelsberg. The film score was composed by Wolfgang Ziegler in collaboration with Wolfgang Fennel.

For cultural reasons the band had to change their name to Baltic Quartet in 1966. After that the group made only one more film appearance, in the little-known film "Trick 17b".

Peter Zimmermann (bass) joined the band and Knud Benedict (guitar) replaced Wolfgang Flennel in 1967, so they renamed themselves the Baltic Quintet. In 1969 Benedict and Seering left the band to form Badister with former Baltic member Fennel, and Reinhard Möller (keyboard).

With the end of the beat era the Baltic Quintett moved closer to the musical genre of the Music Stromers, so becoming a soul band, but they were not able to compete with the popularity of the Music Stormers and split up in 1972. Ziegler formed another band, Wir.

The songs "Sag nie vorbei", produced in 1969 by GDR radio ("Rundfunk der DDR"), and "Mit dir leben" were among their greatest successes. Both were recorded in 1971 by the GDR label Amiga. "Mit dir leben" can also be heard on the Amiga Sampler A Go-Go from 2000. From 1970 to 1972 the band had several opportunities to appeare on GDR television, among others in the youth program Basar.

== Literature ==
- Michael Rauhut (1993), Beat in der Grauzone (in German), Berlin: BasisDruck Verlag GmbH, ISBN 3-86163-063-X
