= Harald Mannl =

German actor

- Born: 25 April 1904; Dresden, Saxony, German Empire
- Died: 20 February 1961 (aged 56); Munich, Bavaria, West Germany
- Occupation: Actor
- Years active: 1948–1961 (film & TV)

Harald Mannl (1904–1961) was a German actor of film, radio and television. He also directed two films for DEFA in East Germany in the mid-1950s, and acted in others, before returning to West Germany.

== Filmography ==
Year	Title	Role	Notes
1948	The Lost Face	Leo L'Arronge	
1949	The Last Illusion	Prof. Fraenkl	
1949	Encounter with Werther	Gesandter	
1949	I'll Make You Happy	Chef vom Dienst	
1950	Sensation in Savoy	Bradt	
1950	Chased by the Devil		Uncredited
1951	Czardas der Herzen		
1951	Immortal Light	Bezirksarzt	
1951	Das ewige Spiel		
1951	Drei Kavaliere	Wildermut	
1951	The Blue Star of the South	Meyrink	
1952	The Forester's Daughter	Wirt	
1952	I Can't Marry Them All	Konsul	
1952	Cuba Cabana	Chefredakteur	
1953	Geheimakten Solvay	Direktor Lütgen	
1953	Tödliche Liebe	Polizeiarzt	
1953	The Chaplain of San Lorenzo	Dr. Bracca	
1953	Die Unbesiegbaren	Karl Frohme	
1954	Gefährliche Fracht	Kettler	
1954	Der Fall Dr. Wagner	Dr. Kurt Wagner	
1955	Der Ochse von Kulm	Waaghuber	
1957	El Hakim	Michaelides	
1960	The Time Has Come	Mr. Nelson	2 episodes

== Bibliography ==
- Feinstein, Joshua Isaac . The Triumph of the Ordinary: Depictions of Daily Life in the East German Cinema 1956–1966. Stanford University, 1995.
