= Benno Pludra =

German children's author (1925–2014)

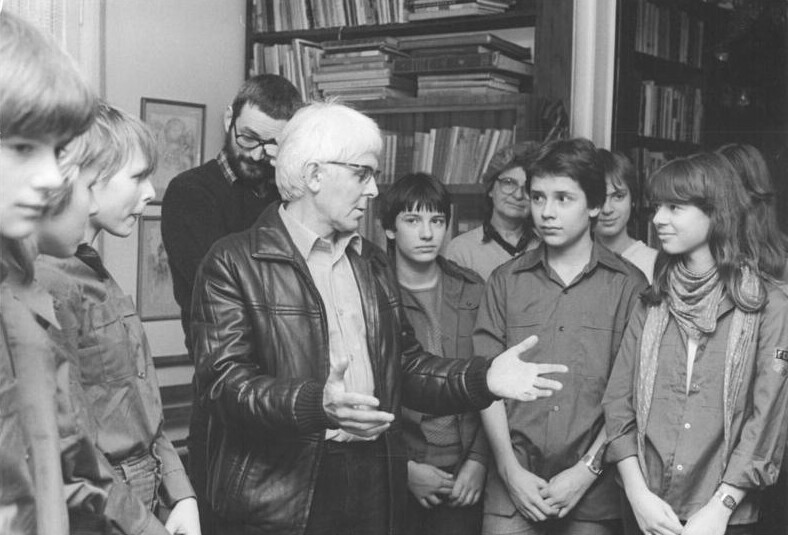
Benno Pludra with students (1984)

Benno Pludra (1 October 1925 – 27 August 2014) was a German children's author. He was born in Mückenberg, now Lauchhammer-West.

Pludra wrote narratives and novels for children and teenagers. More than five million copies of his books have been sold, which made him one of the most successful authors of East Germany. Some of his books were made into feature films. Pludra died in Potsdam in 2014, aged 88.

== Works ==
- Ein Mädchen, fünf Jungen und sechs Traktoren, Berlin 1951
- Die Jungen von Zelt dreizehn, Berlin 1952
- Gustel, Tapp und die andern, Berlin 1953
- In Wiepershagen krähn die Hähne, Berlin 1953
- Vor großer Fahrt, Berlin 1955
- Wenn die Heringe ziehn ..., Berlin 1955
- Haik und Paul, Berlin 1956
- Sheriff Teddy, Berlin 1956
- Jakob sucht Liebe, Berlin 1958
- Bootsmann auf der Scholle, Berlin 1959, ISBN 978-3-40777-106-3
- Popp muß sich entscheiden, Berlin 1959
- Heiner und seine Hähnchen, Berlin 1962 (with Ingeborg Meyer-Rey)
- Unser Schiff kommt von Kukkeia, Berlin 1962 (with Kurt Klamann)
- Lütt Matten und die weiße Muschel, Berlin 1963, ISBN 978-3-40777-115-5
- Die Reise nach Sundevit, Berlin 1965, ISBN 978-3-40777-111-7
- Vom Bären, der nicht mehr schlafen konnte, Berlin 1967 (with Ingeborg Meyer-Rey)
- Tambari, Berlin 1969
- Wie ich nach Swanetien reisen wollte, Berlin 1974
- Die Jungen von Zelt 13 und andere Erzählungen, Berlin 1975
- Sundus und der hafergelbe Hund, Berlin 1975
- Trauermantel und Birke, Berlin 1978
- Es waren einmal ein Paar Schuh, Berlin 1979 (with Renate Totzke-Israel)
- Drinnen schläft die Zaubermaus, Berlin 1980 (with Renate Totzke-Israel)
- Es war ein Ei, Berlin 1980 (with Linde Detlefsen)
- Insel der Schwäne, Berlin 1980, ISBN 978-3-35803-055-4
- Manchmal sind wir schon ganz groß, Berlin 1980 (with Erdmut Oelschlaeger)
- Ein Mädchen fand einen Stein. Die Schwäne auf dem Wasser. Es waren einmal ein Paar Schuh, Berlin 1981 (with Martin Schoppe)
- Wie die Windmühle zu den Wolken flog, Berlin 1981 (with Siegfried Linke)
- Es war eine Biene, Berlin 1983 (with Manfred Bofinger)
- Verkehrte Welt, Berlin 1984 (with Gisela Neumann)
- Das Herz des Piraten, Berlin 1985
- Windmühle, Windmühle, nimm uns mit, Berlin 1987 (with Renate Totzke-Israel)
- Der Waldkauz Hadubrand, Berlin 1988 (with Jutta Mirtschin)
- Das Fräulein Weißmann saß im Garten, Berlin 1989 (with Regine Röder)
- Zum Fluß hinunter, wo die Schiffe ziehn, Berlin 1990
- Aloa-hé, Hamburg 1991
- Siebenstorch, Berlin 1991
- Schreiben für Kinder: Ganz hinten sollte Hoffnung sein, Frankfurt/M. 1993
- Fünf in der Tonne, Berlin 1994
- Leinen los für Wunderfloh, Berlin 1994
- Die Märchen, Berlin 1994
- Der Hund des Kapitäns, Berlin 1999
- Jakob heimatlos, Berlin 1999

== Film adaptions ==
- 1957: Sheriff Teddy – directed by: Heiner Carow
- 1964: Lütt Matten und die weiße Muschel – directed by: Herrmann Zschoche
- 1966: Die Reise nach Sundevit – directed by: Heiner Carow
- 1977: Tambari – directed by: Ulrich Weiß
- 1983: Insel der Schwäne – directed by: Herrmann Zschoche
- 1988: Das Herz des Piraten – directed by: Jürgen Brauer
