= Between Heaven and Earth (1957 film) =

1957 film

- Directed by: Karl Gass
- Release date: 1957
- Country: East Germany
- Language: German

Between Heaven and Earth (German: Zwischen Himmel und Erde) is an East German film. It was released in 1957.
