= Hochmut kommt vor dem Knall =

1960 film

- Directed by: Kurt Jung-Alsen
- Release date: 1960
- Country: East Germany
- Language: German

Hochmut kommt vor dem Knall is an East German comedy film directed by Kurt Jung-Alsen. It was released in 1960.
