= Union of Art =

The Union of Art (German: Gewerkschaft Kunst) was a trade union representing art, media and heritage workers in East Germany.

The union was founded in 1949, when the Free German Trade Union Federation (FDGB) reorganised. The Union of Art and Literature was split up, with workers in theatre, film, television, orchestras, choirs, dance, cabaret, museums, memorials, palaces, gardens, and the visual arts, placed in the new Union of Stage, Art, Film and Music. It initially had 56,400 members. In 1951, it shortened its name to the "Union of Art".

In 1953, the presidency of the union was made an honorary position, with the actual leadership coming from the vice president: Walter Maschke until 1959, then Heinz Schnabel until 1971, and Herbert Bischoff. In 1975, the presidency ceased being honorary, with Bischoff being promoted to it.

Membership of the union grew only slowly, reaching 60,000 by 1964, and 82,557 in 1989.

In October 1989, a group of artists in East Berlin called for protests against the ruling regime. The union decided to back the Alexanderplatz demonstration, held on 4 October, which led Bischoff to resign as president. It became independent in March 1990, and renamed itself as the Union of Art, Culture and Media. It dissolved in October, with members transferred to the Media Union.

== Presidents ==
1950: Kurt Pfannschmidt
1953: Heinrich Allmeroth
1959: Konrad Wolf
1966: Hans-Peter Minetti
1975: Herbert Bischoff
1989: Walfriede Schmitt
