= Schaut auf diese Stadt =

- Directed by: Karl Gass
- Written by: Karl Gass and Karl-Eduard von Schnitzler
- Produced by: Gerhard Abraham
- Starring: Karl Gass; Werner Hoehne
- Cinematography: Hans Dumke
- Edited by: Christel Hemmerling-Gass
- Music by: Jean Kurt Forest
- Release date: 13 August 1962
- Running time: 82 minutes
- Country: Germany
- Language: German

Schaut auf diese Stadt (Look at This City) is an East German documentary film directed by Karl Gass in 1962. The film depicts the city of Berlin following the end of World War II and the struggle between the split between democracy and communism. The film uses authentic footage from newsreels and images from both sides to justify the erection of the Berlin Wall on 13 August 1961. A propaganda film in which East Germany is depicted as peaceful and West Germany is depicted as the forefront of neo-fascism, terrorism, and neo-colonialism, the film insinuates that East Germany requires an "anti-fascist defense" against the West Germans.

== Plot ==
This documentary film uses footage from West Berlin and East Berlin showing reconstruction efforts following the devastation of World War II. The film begins by noting that "This film was made out of concern for peace." Karl Gass created the film on behalf of DEFA.

The film focuses on the reconstruction of Berlin following World War II. The first order of business was putting the people back to work. Government officials in Western Berlin were against the socialization of Berlin and effectively split the city of Berlin into East and West. However, because of the signing of the Potsdam Agreement, the Soviets had control of Berlin. Therefore, this became a global issue because the USSR and the United States of America were trying to impose their spheres of influence on nations.

The main point of the film was that Germany was tired of bloodshed. If the Berlin Wall could keep the nation from more death, they would be satisfied. Germany was trying to become the strongest military from the beginning of World War I in 1914, until the end of World War II in 1945, and it had taken a toll on the nation. East Germany was content with being a part of the Eastern world as long as this precluded the return of war.

== Cast ==
- Karl Gass
- Werner Hoehne
- Eberhard Mellies
- Georg Thies
