= Die Stiere des Hidalgo =

1959 film by Karl Gass

- Directed by: Karl Gass
- Release date: 1959
- Country: East Germany
- Language: German

Die Stiere des Hidalgo is an East German film. It was released in 1959.
