= Senta auf Abwegen =

1959 film

- Directed by: Martin Hellberg
- Written by: Martin Hellberg
- Cinematography: Karl Plintzner
- Edited by: Ursula Rudzki
- Music by: Helmut Nier
- Release date: 1959
- Country: East Germany
- Language: German

Senta auf Abwegen is an East German film. It was released in 1959.

== Cast ==
- Günther Simon: Max Matuschek
- Karin Buchali: Franze Flohr
- Ruth Maria Kubitschek: Mathilde
- Wolf Kaise: Dattelmann
- Albert Garbe: Exner
- Walter Jupé: Erwin Kuhlicke
- Werner Lierck: Arthur Kallweit
- Johannes Arpe: Emil Schwennicke
- Rudolf Fleck: Holdegel
- Hans Klering: Wurzel
- Axel Triebel: Max Munk
- Dom de Beern: Tietz
- Jochen Diestelmann: Reinhold
- Hans Sievers: Martin
- Brigitte Stroh: Renate
