= Michael Kann =

German actor and film director

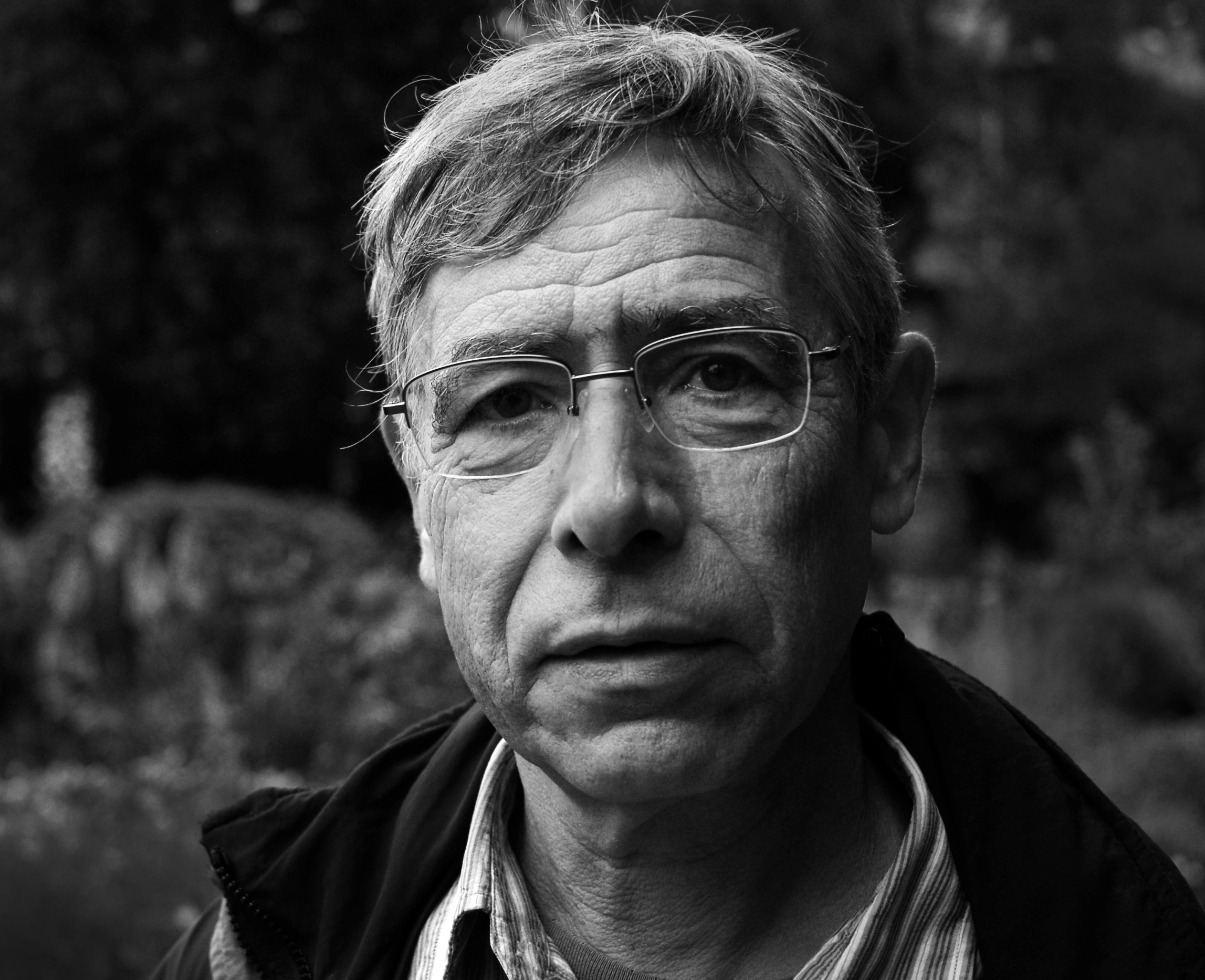
- Born: 1950 (age 75–76); East Berlin, East Germany
- Education: KONRAD WOLF Babelsberg Film University
- Occupations: Film director; Actor

Michael Kann (born 13 January 1950) is a German film director and actor. He was born in Berlin, East Germany, on 13 January 1950.

== Education ==
Kann graduated from the Alexander von Humboldt extended secondary school in Berlin-Köpenick, as a skilled heating, ventilation, and air conditioning (HVAC) technician. However, he had become interested in film and theater, so he joined the Staatliche Schauspielschule Berlin (State drama school, now HfS Ernst Busch, graduating in 1971. Kann found work as an Actor and Assistant Director at the Deutsches Theater (German Theater, Berlin until 1975. From 1975 to 1979, Kann studied directing at the GDR's Deutsche Hochschule für Filmkunst (Academy of Film Art) in Potsdam-Babelsberg, now the Konrad Wolf Babelsberg Film University. After the Singer-Songwriter Wolf Biermann was stripped of his citizenship by the East Germany (GDR) government, Kann openly criticized the regime. This led to difficulties for Kann, and it was only through the intervention of Konrad Wolf, a friend of Kann's, that he was able to continue with his studies.

== First features ==
In 1979, Kann produced his graduation film Natalja dir, dir Isaak (Dedicated to Natalija and Isaak) with Jenny Gröllmann and Hilmar Baumann. The basis for this film was a story in the memoirs of the Soviet writer, journalist, and historian Ilya Erenburg, which also appeared in Erenburg's Black Book, which was banned under Stalin. In the memoir, a Russian woman hid her Jewish husband under the stove for 26 months in the German-occupied Smolensk region and told their children that their father was a rat. Bertolt Brecht also mentioned this story after meeting Erenburg at Anna Seghers’ residence in Berlin. Natalja dir, dir Isaak was broadcast on state television on 6 May 1980 and screened at a CILECT convention in Edinburgh the same year. It was subsequently invited to the Student Academy Award in the USA. However, it was not entered in the competition as the submission was prevented by the Cultural Department of the Central Committee of the Socialist Unity Party of Germany (SED). An invitation to the film festival in Tampere (Finland) was also turned down by the SED. According to Lothar Bisky, the then-superintendent of the Academy of Film Art, the regime was worried about the accumulation of Jewish components (i.e., the theme, Erenburg's status, Kann's own family, and a suspected American-Jewish lobby).

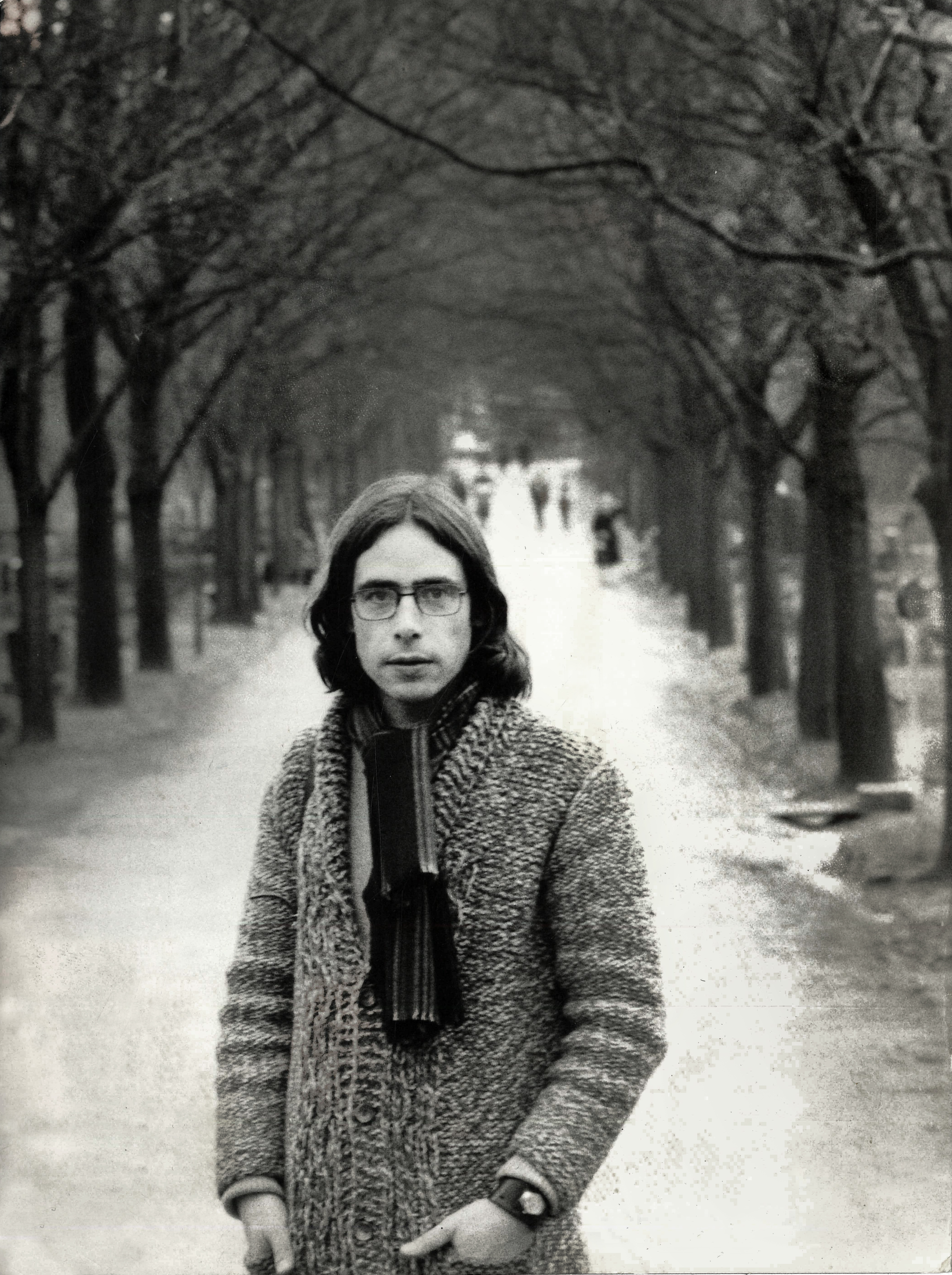
Michael Kann photo taken by Gudrun Olthoff(1982)

In the GDR, which officially had full employment, Michael Kann, because of his suspected oppositional politics, could not find permanent work after graduation and worked occasionally as a freelance actor until 1981. Kann wrote to the Minister of Culture at the time, Joachim Hoffmann, and asked, "What would you do in my place?" Shortly thereafter, he received a contract on a probationary period as assistant director at DEFA, the state-owned film studio.

Kann was immediately employed as a dialogue coach, and as an assistant director for Juan Antonio Bardem’s international co-production The Warning (Die Mahnung). In 1985, he co-directed the Czech fairytale film Magical Inheritance (Eine zauberhafte Erbschaft). A year later, at the age of 36, he was named a DEFA Nachwuchs-Regisseur (DEFA Upcoming Director) with his feature film Stielke, Heinz, Fifteen... (Stielke, Heinz, fünfzehn...). DEFA did not authorize the original title Stielke, a German Boy (Stielke, ein deutscher Junge), because of the word "German“, which was deemed too controversial. The grotesque-ironic drama about a Jewish boy who was a member of the Hitler Youth caused a storm. While the official party press almost unanimously disliked the film (Neues Deutschland, Junge Welt, newspapers of the SED district leaderships), there was also supportive press coverage: "The psychology of fascism comes into view", "Stielke can help form characters that we need; form people who interfere in the struggles for humanity..." The film opened on 12 February 1987 on only 15 movie screens, but was seen by about 370,000 (mostly teenage) viewers in the GDR. School screenings were forbidden in the Rostock district and the film was not broadcast on television. This remained the case even after the GDR joined the FRG. Speaking about the censorship of Germany's Nazi past in both the East and West. Kann's next work came out the same year. The Distance Between You And Me And Her (Die Entfernung zwischen dir und mir und ihr), a contemporary comedy, was intended to redeem his reputation. For the film, Kann took the original story by the author, gave it a more socially relevant twist, and changed the linear narrative, which led to disputes with Kolditz. The film won Best Screenplay at the GDR in Karl-Marx-Stadt. The film was at first negatively received by the Department of the Ministry of Culture, and its premiere was relegated to the "Workers' Festival" in Suhl, the smallest district of the GDR. The Distance Between You and Me and Her was an unexpected hit. At the premiere, the Deputy Minister of Culture and Head of the HV Film, Horst Pehnert, was prompted to confess: "Even a minister can be wrong."

In 1988, the social climate in the GDR was visibly changing. Kann's films received approving, even euphoric, press coverage, with praises for his "cheeky, provocative language", which led to box-office success. The Distance Between You and Me and Her also received attention in the West. In 1989 it received the Max Ophüls Prize in Saarbrücken, and also received a deal for West German film distribution at the GDR Film Days in Tübingen. Additional screenings were quickly added due to its popularity among audiences and critics: "Witty, unmasking comments on today's GDR", "Michael Kann channels Wilder, Lubitsch, and Woody Allen", "Cinema as a crutch for the audience, and a multiple choice question for the censor."

Kann withdrew from two other projects, the screenplay Über die Grenzen (1990) and the novel Schwalbenjagd by Benito Wogatzki (1989) because of the political disconnect with reality, and resigned from the SED in the spring of 1989. In 1992, Kann co-directed the feature film 1 May, I'm Searching for Your Face (1. Mai, ich suche dein Gesicht) for the ARD broadcasting station Ostdeutscher Rundfunk Brandenburg (ORB). In 1996, he directed the documentary Don't Cry, Hungary on the Hungarian Uprising of 1956. The film was broadcast by MAGYAR TV, Arte, and Mitteldeutscher Rundfunk (MDR).

== Filmography ==
=== Director ===
- Cuando de Chile (1977)
- Natalja dir, dir Isaak (1979, "Dedicated to Natalija and Isaak")
- Eine zauberhafte Erbschaft (1985, "A Magical Inheritance")
- Stielke, Heinz, fünfzehn... (1987, 'Stielke, Heinz, fifteen...)
- Die Entfernung zwischen dir und mir und ihr (1988, “The Distance Between You and Me and Her”
- 1. Mai, ich suche dein Gesicht (1992,„1 May, I'm Looking for Your Face”)
- Weine nicht, Ungarn (1996, “Don't cry, Hungary”)

=== Actor ===
- Rottenknechte (1971, “Rotten Servants”)
- Du und ich und Klein-Paris (1971, “You and I and Little Paris”)
- Ein wundersamer Schatz (1973, “A Wondrous Treasure”)
- Die schwarze Mühle (1975, “The Black Mill”)
- Trini (1977)
- Hotel Polan und seine Gäste (1980, “Hotel Polan and its Guests”)
- Bürgschaft für ein Jahr (1981, “Cosigning for a Year”)
- Polizeiruf 110: Blue Dream – Tod im Regen (1993, Police 911: Blue Dream – Death in the Rain”)

=== Theater ===
- Friedrich Schiller: Der Parasit (1971, "The Parasite")
- Ulrich Plenzdorf: Die neuen Leiden des jungen W. (1972, "The New Sorrows of Young W.")
- Goethe: Faust 1 (1973)

== Audiobooks ==
- Pawels Lehrjahre (1973, "Pawel's Student Years")
- Putze Polina (2003, "Cleaner Polina")

== Other activities ==
Kann worked as a lecturer at the University of Arts (HFK, Hochschule für Künste Bremen), at the Filmuniversität (KONRAD WOLF Babelsberg Film University) in Potsdam-Babelsberg, the School of Acting (Schauspielschule) Art Of Acting in Berlin, and University of Music and Theatre "Felix Mendelssohn Bartholdy" Leipzig (Hochschule für Musik und Theater, or HMT) (Leipzig). In addition, he led workshops at the Film Museum Potsdam, for, amongst other groups, deaf children and children with Down's Syndrome.

== Awards ==
- 1988: 5th National Feature Film Festival of Karl-Marx-Stadt: Best Young Male Actor, Best Scenario for Die Entfernung zwischen dir und mir und ihr (The Distance Between You and Me and Her)
- 1989: 10th Max-Ophüls Festival in Saarbrücken: Stipend Award of Saarfilm for Die Entfernung zwischen dir und mir und ihr (“The Distance Between You and Me and Her”)
