= Forschen und Schaffen. Folge VI =

1954 film

- Directed by: Heiner Carow
- Release date: 1954
- Country: East Germany
- Language: German

Forschen und Schaffen. Folge VI is an East German film. It was released in 1954.
