= Jungfer, Sie gefällt mir =

1969 East German film

- Directed by: Günter Reisch
- Written by: Jurek Becker; Günter Reisch
- Based on: The Broken Jug (play) by Heinrich von Kleist
- Starring: Wolfgang Kieling
- Distributed by: DEFA
- Release date: 1969
- Country: East Germany
- Language: German

Jungfer, Sie gefällt mir is an East German film, based upon the play The Broken Jug by Heinrich von Kleist. It was released in 1969.

== Plot ==
A Saxon village in 1792: While the Prussians go against France, the haymaking takes place in the village and the resolute Marthe catches her daughter Ev with the village blacksmith Ruprecht in the hay.

== See also ==
- List of East German films
