= Kapitäne bleiben an Bord =

1959 film

- Directed by: Martin Hellberg
- Written by: Jürgen Lenz
- Produced by: Paul Ramacher
- Cinematography: Walter Fehdmer; Günter Marczinkowsky
- Edited by: Lieselotte Johl
- Music by: Wolfgang Pietsch
- Release date: 27 February 1959 (East Germany)
- Running time: 89 minutes
- Country: East Germany
- Language: German

Kapitäne bleiben an Bord is an East German film. It was released in 1959.

== Cast ==
- Johannes Arpe as Hannes Tiedeböhl
- Christel Bodenstein as Karin
- Otto Erich Edenharter as Fünning
- Albert Hetterle as Geelhaar
- Erika Müller-Fürstenau as Hanna Kars
- Rudolf Ulrich as Kurt Kars
