= Der kleine Kuno =

1959 film

- Directed by: Kurt Jung-Alsen
- Written by: Peter Brock
- Starring: Siegfried Ewert, Rudolf Ulrich, Rolf Ludwig
- Cinematography: Otto Merz
- Edited by: Friedel Welsandt
- Music by: Gerhard Wohlgemuth
- Distributed by: DEFA
- Release date: June 12, 1959
- Running time: 52 minutes
- Country: East Germany
- Language: German

Der kleine Kuno is an East German black and white children's adventure film, directed by Kurt Jung-Alsen. It was released in 1959, and is set in October 1959 during the tenth anniversary celebrations of the foundation of the communist East Germany state as seen through the lens of a little boy and his two-day adventures. The author of the film script, Peter Brock (1916–1982), subsequently modified the text into a popular book for children with the same title.

== Plot ==
Kuno (Siegfried Ewert), a six-year-old boy, has had a long-sought after wish: he wanted to experience what it is that grown-ups do at night while he is asleep. After getting up (after feigning sleep), he sneaks out of his home.

Kuno encounters workers at a locomotive factory who give him a ride on a newly produced locomotive. After observing the fire department putting out a fire, he hides in an ambulance, and along with a little girl suffering from smoke inhalation, is quickly driven to a hospital. It is ascertained that he rode unauthorized in the ambulance, so his parents are called by the Volkspolizei just as he runs away from the hospital.

Kuno converses with a soldier (Stefan Lisewski) in the National People's Army in front of the local barracks until suddenly all the soldiers leave to prepare for the military parade for their country's 10 year anniversary. After further wandering at night, Kuno watches adults dancing at a large municipal dance hall near the city's center which is being broadcast live on TV. After the police find him and bring him to his father (Rudolf Ulrich) who is still working the night shift as a typesetter at a printing company, a newspaper reporter (Rolf Ludwig) agrees to bring Kuno to his mother (Margit Schaumäker) who is just returning home from her shift as a nighttime streetcar conductor, and after they get home, she puts her son to bed.

== Reception ==
The monthly publication Deutsche Filmkunst praised the film. “It is certainly the first film by DEFA – not only among their films for children – which was constructed with so much poetic artistry. What's new in this film? It makes the unlikely possible. It shows the magic of a big city in the eyes of a six-year-old boy.”

Neues Deutschland critic Horst Knietzsch commented that “Der kleine Kuno is not a 'big' film, with all the bombastic claims that 'big' films so often unjustifiably make. It is a small, good film, in many details of its design exemplary of the modern, socialist children's film.”

Benita Blessing argues that, in the history of East German cinematography, “Der kleine Kuno” is representative of a new “generation of films [which] turned to children as adventurous members of a society who look forward to a bright future. In this casting young people are freed from the burden of the Nazi past and begin to make their own mistakes from which they can learn.” Part of the reasoning behind the new direction was the state's policy to confront the many negative social issues surrounding the East German uprising of 1953 with positive socialist imaginary of progress in GDR film and fiction.
