= An der Via Egnatia – Historisches und Heutiges über Stadt und Messe =

1957 film

An der Via Egnatia - Historisches und Heutiges über Stadt und Messe
- Directed by: Karl Gass
- Release date: 1957
- Running time: 23 minutes
- Country: East Germany
- Language: German

An der Via Egnatia – Historisches und Heutiges über Stadt und Messe is a 1957 East German documentary film produced by the DEFA Studio for Popular Science Films. Directed by Karl Gass, the 23-minute colour film portrays the city of Thessaloniki (Saloniki), Greece’s second-largest city and the site of the national trade fair. The documentary depicts the city’s landmarks and social conditions.

The film was shot on 35 mm and features cinematography by Ernst Laude, editing by Waltraud Hartmann, music by Wolfgang Hohensee, and narration by Otto Mellies.
