= Ein Schritt weiter =

1953 film

- Directed by: Heiner Carow
- Release date: 1953
- Country: East Germany
- Language: German

Ein Schritt weiter is an East German film. It was released in 1953.
