= Martins Tagebuch =

1955 film

- Directed by: Heiner Carow
- Release date: 1955
- Country: East Germany
- Language: German

Martins Tagebuch is an East German film. It was released in 1955.
