= Bauern erfüllen den Plan =

1952 film by Heiner Carow

- Directed by: Heiner Carow
- Release date: 1952
- Country: East Germany
- Language: German

Bauern erfüllen den Plan is an East German documentary film about the first East German Five-Year Plan. It was directed by Heiner Carow and released in 1952.
