= Wo der Zug nicht lange hält... =

1960 film

- Directed by: Joachim Hasler
- Release date: 1960
- Country: East Germany
- Language: German

Wo der Zug nicht lange hält... is an East German film. It was released in 1960.
