= Brücke zwischen gestern und morgen =

1959 film

- Directed by: Fred Mahr
- Written by: Kurt Bortfeldt; Hans Müncheberg
- Starring: Antje Ruge
- Release date: 4 October 1959
- Country: East Germany
- Language: German

Brücke zwischen gestern und morgen (English: Bridge Between Yesterday and Tomorrow) is an East German television film directed by Fred Mahr. It was released in 1959.

== Cast ==
- Antje Ruge as Frau Wermann
- Rudolf Ulrich as Hans Gutweil
- Ellinor Vogel as Herta Gutweil
- Hans Knötzsch as Flüchting
- Peter A. Stiege as Willi Rückert
