= Wyscig pokoju – Warszawa-Berlin-Praga =

1952 film

- Directed by: Joris Ivens
- Release date: 1952
- Running time: 48 minutes
- Countries: Poland; East Germany
- Language: Polish

Wyscig pokoju – Warszawa-Berlin-Praga is a Polish-East German film based on the Peace Race. It was released in 1952.
