= Kindergymnastik =

1957 film

- Directed by: Rolf Losansky
- Release date: 1957
- Country: East Germany
- Language: German

Kindergymnastik is an East German film. It was released in 1957.
