= Die Dame und der Blinde =

1959 film

- Directed by: Hans-Erich Korbschmitt
- Country of origin: East Germany
- Original language: German

Original release
- Release: 1959

Die Dame und der Blinde is an East German film. It was released in 1959.
