= Das grüne Ungeheuer =

1959 novel by Wolfgang Schreyer

- Author: Wolfgang Schreyer
- Language: German
- Publication date: 1959
- Publication place: East Germany

Das grüne Ungeheuer is a novel published in 1959 by East German author Wolfgang Schreyer. It is also the title of a five-episode miniseries adaptation from the book, produced in 1962 by film director Rudi Kurz for Deutscher Fernsehfunk.
