= Vom mutigen Hans =

1958 film

- Directed by: Katja Georgi; Klaus Georgi
- Release date: 1958; (Note: The imdb misdates the film as released in 1959. The DEFA dates it to 1958.)
- Running time: 593m(film length)
- Country: East Germany
- Language: German

Vom mutigen Hans is an East German puppet animated short film. It was released in 1958 and was an adaptation of the Grimm brothers tale The Story of the Youth Who Went Forth to Learn What Fear Was.
