= Christine und die Störche =

1962 film

Christine and the Storks
- Directed by: Jirí Jahn
- Release date: 1962
- Country: East Germany
- Language: German

Christine and the Storks is an East German film. It was released in 1962.
