= Immer bereit =

1950 film

- Directed by: Kurt Maetzig
- Release date: 1950
- Running time: 66 minutes
- Country: East Germany
- Language: German

Immer bereit is an East German documentary film about the nationwide Free German Youth (FDJ) meeting in Berlin in 1950. It was released in 1950.
