= Simplon-Tunnel =

1959 film

- Starring: Brigitte Kraus, Horst Weinheimer
- Release date: 1959
- Country: East Germany
- Language: German

Simplon-Tunnel is an East German film. It was released in 1959.
