= Die Premiere fällt aus =

1959 film

- Directed by: Kurt Jung-Alsen
- Release date: 1959
- Country: East Germany
- Language: German

Die Premiere fällt aus is an East German film. It was released in 1959.
