= The Sonnenbrucks =

1951 film

- Directed by: Georg C. Klaren
- Written by: Kurt Maetzig
- Based on: Niemcy by Leon Kruczkowski
- Starring: Eduard von Winterstein; Maly Delschaft; Ursula Burg
- Cinematography: Fritz Lehmann
- Edited by: Friedel Welsandt
- Music by: Ernst Roters
- Production company: DEFA
- Distributed by: Progress Film
- Release date: 1 March 1951
- Running time: 98 minutes
- Country: East Germany
- Language: German

The Sonnenbrucks (German: Die Sonnenbrucks) is a 1951 East German drama film directed by Georg C. Klaren and starring Eduard von Winterstein, Maly Delschaft and Ursula Burg. It was shot at the Johannisthal Studios in East Berlin. It was made by the state-run DEFA production house. The film's sets were designed by the art directors Willi Eplinius, Willy Schiller and Arthur Schwarz. It was based on the 1949 play Niemcy by Polish writer Leon Kruczkowski.

== Synopsis ==
In 1943, the apolitical Professor Walter Sonnenbruck celebrates his 30-year teaching anniversary at Göttingen University while his son serves in the SS and his daughter performs as a pianist in occupied France. When his former assistant, Joachim Peters, escapes from a concentration camp and seeks help, the professor doesn't betray him but passive. It is his daughter Ruth who risks everything to help Peters go underground and escape.

After the war, Sonnenbruck hopes to return to "pure science" free from politics, but he is soon disillusioned by the persistent ideological conflicts at his university in West Germany. Upon attending a medical congress in the East Germany and reuniting with the now-successful Peters, the professor undergoes a change of heart and decides to leave the West to join his former assistant in the East

== Cast ==
- Eduard von Winterstein as Prof. Walter Sonnenbruck
- Maly Delschaft as Bertha Sonnenbruck
- Ursula Burg as Ruth Sonnenbruck
- Raimund Schelcher as Dozent Joachim Peters
- Irene Korb as Liesel Sonnenbruck
- Aleksandra Śląska as Fanchette
- Horst Preusker as Willi Sonnenbruck
- Hans-Georg Rudolph as Ministerialrat Behnke
- Kurt Mikulski as Anton
- Aribert Grimmer as Hoppe
- Rudolf Fleck as Schulz
- Albert Venohr as Jurys
- Peter Ahrenknecht as Chaim
- Käte Alving as Agnes Sörensen
- Friedrich Maurer as Tourterelle
- Kurt-Otto Fritsch as Gefreiter
- Harry Riebauer as Student
- Maria Loja as Dicke Köchin
- Herbert Köfer as Christian Föns
- Peter Lehmbrock as Norweger
- Peter Petersen as 1. Gestapobeamter
- Angelika Hurwicz as Ostarbeiterin
- Hannelore Wüst as Postbotin

== Bibliography ==
- Jacobsen, Wolfgang. Babelsberg: ein Filmstudio 1912-1992. Argon, 1992.
- Waterkamp, Rainer. Nationalsozialismus und Judenverfolgung in DDR-Medien. Bundeszentrale für Politische Bildung, 1997.
