= Sie nannten ihn Amigo =

1959 film

- Directed by: Heiner Carow
- Release date: 1959
- Country: East Germany
- Language: German

Sie nannten ihn Amigo is an East German film. It was released in 1959.
