= Geheimakten Solvay =

1953 film

- Directed by: Martin Hellberg
- Written by: Karl-Georg Egel (writer); Richard Groschopp (writer); Walter Jupé (dramaturgue)
- Cinematography: Eugen Klagemann
- Edited by: Johanna Rosinski
- Music by: Ernst Roters
- Release date: 1953
- Running time: 105
- Country: East Germany
- Language: German

Geheimakten Solvay is an East German film. It was released in 1953, and sold more than 3,800,000 tickets.

== Cast ==
- Wilhelm Koch-Hooge: Hannes Lorenz
- Leny Marenbach: Bertha Lorenz
- Ulrich Thein: Fritz Lorenz
- Rudolf Klix: Hauptbuchhalter Treusch
- Johannes Arpe: Walter Schramm
- Sigrid Roth: Gerda Schramm
- Harald Mannl: Direktor Lütgen
- Raimund Schelcher: Mertens
- Gertrud Meyen: Elisabeth Bergen
- Peter Herden: Max Wredel
- Paul R. Henker: Ofenmeister Schaub
- Kurt Wildersinn: Lau
- Alexander Hunzinger: Krumme
- Carl Balhaus: Rudi
- Rudolf Fleck: Paul
- Theo Shall: Director Menneke
