= Sheriff Teddy =

1957 East German film

- Directed by: Heiner Carow
- Written by: Benno Pludra
- Release date: 1957
- Country: East Germany
- Language: German

Sheriff Teddy is a 1957 East German children's film. The film depicts a thirteen-year-old boy named Kalle who moves from West Berlin to the Eastern side of the divided city of Berlin. The film contrasts life in the different sides of the city and intends to show the superior life in the East.
