= Flitterwochen ohne Ehemann =

1961 film

- Directed by: Helmut Spieß
- Country of origin: East Germany
- Original language: German

Original release
- Release: 1961

Flitterwochen ohne Ehemann is an East German television film. It was released in 1961.
