= Wer seine Frau lieb hat =

1955 film

- Directed by: Kurt Jung-Alsen
- Release date: 1955
- Country: East Germany
- Language: German

Wer seine Frau lieb hat is an East German film. It was released in 1955.
