= Wie die Wilden =

1959 film

- Directed by: Ruth Heucke-Langenscheidt
- Country of origin: East Germany
- Original language: German

Original release
- Release: 1959

Wie die Wilden ("Like the Savages") is an East German television film. It was released in 1959.
