= Der verlorene Ball =

1959 film

- Directed by: Kurt Weiler
- Release date: 1959
- Country: East Germany
- Language: German

Der verlorene Ball (English: "The Lost Ball") is an East German film. It was released in 1959.
