= Die Feststellung =

1958 film

- Directed by: Herbert Fischer
- Release date: 1958
- Country: East Germany
- Language: German

Die Feststellung is an East German film. It was released in 1958.
