= Fiete im Netz =

1958 film

- Directed by: Siegfried Hartmann
- Written by: Fritz Meyer-Scharffenberg (novel)
- Release date: 1957
- Country: East Germany
- Language: German

Fiete im Netz (Fiete in the Net) is a 1957 East German drama film.

Filmdienst described the film as follows "Children's film that tells slowly and precisely, without any sensationalism, how a nine-year-old angler allows himself to be persuaded by two bullies to hide their evil prank of drowning a drake. His guilty conscience and a new evil act then make him reveal the truth."

The film, Siegfried Hartmann's directorial feature debut, "received harsh, ideological scolding because of a “lack of relevance to the times.”'

== Cast ==
- Joachim Schimanski as Fiete
- Anton Kuck as Heiner
- Erika Müller-Fürstenau as Fiete's mother
- Ulrike Brunn as Liesa
- Gustav Püttjer as Opa
