= Drei Mädchen im Endspiel =

1956 film

- Directed by: Kurt Jung-Alsen
- Release date: 1956
- Running time: 74 minutes
- Country: East Germany
- Language: German

Drei Mädchen im Endspiel is an East German film. It was released in 1956.
