= Stärker als die Nacht =

1954 film by Slatan Dudow

- Directed by: Slatan Dudow
- Written by: Kurt Stern; Jeanne Stern
- Cinematography: Karl Plintzner; Horst E. Brandt
- Edited by: Johanna Rosinski
- Music by: Ernst Roters
- Production company: DEFA
- Release date: January 1954
- Country: East Germany
- Language: German

Stärker als die Nacht ('Stronger than the Night') is an East German film directed by Slatan Dudow. It was released in January 1954.

== Cast ==
- Wilhelm Koch-Hooge: Hans Löning
- Helga Göring: Gerda Löning
- Kurt Oligmüller: Erich Bachmann
- Rita Gödikmeier: Lotte Bachmann
- Harald Halgardt: Eddi Nohl
- Helmut Schreiber: Hackelbusch
- Peter Priemer: Klaus-Peter Löning
- Manfred Borges: Helmut Karsten
- Hans Wehrl: Bernhard Manthey
- Erika Dunkelmann: Käthe Manthey
- Aribert Grimmer: Langer, hagerer Arbeiter
- Heinz Hinze: Herr Globig
- Gertrud Brendler: Frau Globig
- Johannes Arpe: Gauleiter
- Adolf Peter Hoffmann: Kriminalkommissar Knappe
- Theo Shall: Dr. Panneck
- Hans-Joachim Büttner: Dr. Hermes
- Wolfgang Hübner: Günther
- Achim Hübner: Rezitator
- Martin Knapfel: Meister
- Grete Carlsohn: Bäckersfrau
- Gustav Püttjer: Kraftfahrer
- Harro ten Brook: Polizeioffizier
- Anna-Maria Besendahl: Zimmerwirtin
- Karl Brenk: Gefängniswärter
- Hermann Dieckhoff: Geistlicher
- Fredy Barten: Gastwirt
- Ada Mahr: Portiersfrau
- Jean Brahn: Gastwirt
- Wolfgang Brunecker: SS-Posten
- Ursula Dücker: Krankenschwester
- Edith Volkmann: Junge Arbeiterin
- Fritz Löffler: Mann mit Hakenkreuz
- Waldhorst Schmidt: SS-Offizier
- Paul Pfingst: Bauarbeiter
- Brigitte Keppler: Aufnahmeschwester
- Horst Schumann: Schupo-Offizier
- Trude Brentina: Kundin im Bäckerladen
- Werner Finck: Kommentarsprecher
- Inge Bartel: Kommentarsprecherin
- Karl Block: Gefängniswärter
- Alif Mohamed: Spanier
- Ursula Hermann: Sekretärin bei Hackelbusch
- Manfred Frömchen: Personalleiter
- Christoph Beyertt: Junger Arbeiter
- Otto Saltzmann: Älterer Häftling
- Kurt Barthel: Arbeiter
- Gerry Wolff: Gefangener
