= Die Entscheidung des Tilman Riemenschneider =

1954 film

- Directed by: Bodo von Schweykowski
- Country of origin: East Germany
- Original language: German

Original release
- Release: 1954

Die Entscheidung des Tilman Riemenschneider is a 1954 East German television film written by Hermann Rodigast about the medieval wood carver Tilman Riemenschneider.
