= Daß ein gutes Deutschland blühe =

1959 film

- Directed by: Joop Huisken
- Release date: 1959
- Running time: 90 minutes
- Country: East Germany
- Language: German

Daß ein gutes Deutschland blühe is an East German documentary film directed by Joop Huisken. It was released in 1960.
