= Einheit SPD-KPD =

1946 film

- Directed by: Kurt Maetzig
- Release date: 1946
- Running time: 20 minutes
- Country: East Germany
- Language: German

Einheit SPD-KPD is an East German short subject documentary film about the merging of the Communist Party of Germany (KPD) and the Social Democratic Party of Germany (SPD) into the Socialist Unity Party of Germany (SED), directed by Kurt Maetzig. It was released in 1946.
