= Der Verschenkte Leutnant =

1955 film

- Directed by: Wolfgang Luderer
- Release date: 1955
- Country: East Germany
- Language: German

Der Verschenkte Leutnant is an East German film. It was released in 1955.
