= Unter dem Rauschen deiner Wimpern =

1951 film

- Directed by: Gerhard Klein
- Release date: 1951
- Country: East Germany
- Language: German

Unter dem Rauschen deiner Wimpern is an East German film. It was released in 1951.
