= Hans-Peter Minetti =

20th Century German Actor

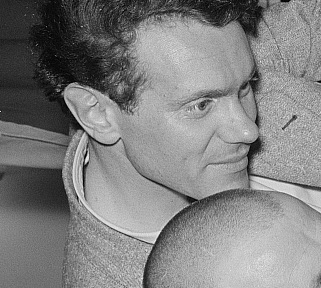
- Hans-Peter Minetti during the 1950s
- Born: 21 April 1926; Berlin, Weimar Germany
- Died: 10 November 2006 (aged 80); Cheb, Czech Republic
- Occupation: Actor
- Years active: 1954–1996

Hans-Peter Minetti (21 April 1926 – 10 November 2006) was a German actor. He studied at the Theaterhochschule Leipzig and appeared in more than sixty films from 1954 to 1996.

From 1966 until 1975, he was the president of the Union of Art.

The actor Bernhard Minetti was his father.

== Selected filmography ==
Year	Title	Role	Notes
1963	Reserved for the Death		
1959	An Old Love		
1959	Always on Duty		
1959	Special Mission		
1957	Lissy		
1957	Polonia-Express		
1955	Der Teufel vom Mühlenberg		
1954	Ernst Thälmann		

Trade union offices
Preceded by Konrad Wolf	President of the Union of Art; 1966–1975	Succeeded by Herbert Bischoff
