= Johannes Arpe =

German actor (1897–1962)

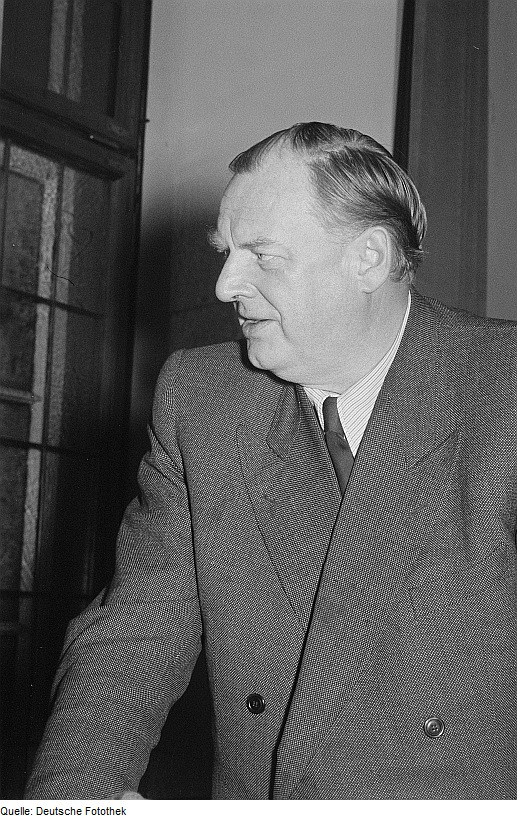
- Born: 29 July 1897; Hamburg, German Empire
- Died: 3 October 1962 (aged 65); Kleinmachnow, East Germany
- Occupation: Actor
- Years active: 1953-1962

Johannes Arpe (29 July 1897 – 3 October 1962) was a German actor. He appeared in more than thirty films from 1953 to 1962.

== Selected filmography ==
Year	Title	Role	Notes
1953	Geheimakten Solvay		
1954	Carola Lamberti – Eine vom Zirkus		
1954	Stärker als die Nacht		
1955	Das Fräulein von Scuderi		
1955	Der Teufel vom Mühlenberg		
1955	52 Weeks Make A Year		
1956	The Captain from Cologne		
1959	Kapitäne bleiben an Bord		
1959	Senta auf Abwegen		
1959	Before the Lightning Strikes		
1960	Doctor Ahrendt's Decision		
