= Soldat und Sportler =

1959 film

- Directed by: Rolf Losansky
- Release date: 1959
- Country: East Germany
- Language: German

Soldat und Sportler is an East German film. It was released in 1959.
