= Für ein einiges, glückliches Vaterland =

1950 film

- Directed by: Gerhard Klein
- Release date: 1950
- Running time: 10 minutes
- Country: East Germany
- Language: German

Für ein einiges, glückliches Vaterland is an East German film. It was released in 1950.
