= Piloten, Propeller und Turbinen =

1958 film

- Directed by: Jürgen Thierlein
- Release date: 1958
- Country: East Germany
- Language: German

Piloten, Propeller und Turbinen is an East German film. It was released in 1958.
