= Tiergestalt =

1950 film

- Directed by: Fritz Brunsch
- Release date: 1950
- Country: East Germany
- Language: German

Tiergestalt is an East German documentary film about Berlin Zoological Garden and Leipzig Zoological Garden. It was released in 1950.
