= Der Fall Dr. Wagner =

1954 film

- Directed by: Carl Balhaus; Harald Mannl; Ursula Pohle
- Written by: Jan Petersen
- Starring: Harald Mannl
- Cinematography: Eugen Klagemann
- Release date: 1954
- Running time: 90 minutes
- Country: East Germany
- Language: German

Der Fall Dr. Wagner is an East German film directed by Harald Mannl, assisted by Carl Balhaus and Ursula Pohle. It was released in 1954.

== Cast ==
- Harald Mannl as Dr. Kurt Wagner
- Johanna Endemann as Rita Wagner
- Brigitte Hecht as Inge Wagner
- Dieter Heusinger as Hans Henning
- Hans Wehrl as Gerhard Scholz
- Hans-Peter Thielen as Rudolf Neumann
- Raimund Schelcher as Erich Rückert
- Theo Shall as Rolling
- Wolf Kaiser as Feder
- Peter-Paul Göst as Angehöriger der Sicherheitsorgane
- Horst Preusker as VP-Kommandeur
- Werner Berndt as Karlchen Schneider
