= Fridericus Rex – elfter Teil =

1957 film

Fridericus Rex - elfter Teil
- Directed by: Frank Beyer
- Release date: 1957
- Running time: 10 minutes
- Country: East Germany
- Language: German

Fridericus Rex – elfter Teil is an East German film. It was released in 1957.

The film was made by the Produktionsgruppe Stacheltier.
