= Eisetüde =

1956 East German film

- Directed by: Rolf Losansky
- Release date: 1956
- Country: East Germany
- Language: German

Eisetüde (Ice Étude) is an East German film. It was released in 1956.
