= Secrets of Nature (1950 film) =

1950 film

- Russian: Тайны природы
- Directed by: Israel M. Berman; Boris Dolin
- Production companies: Kiev Tech Filmstudio; Mostech; Viking
- Release date: 9 September 1950 (USA)
- Running time: 80 minutes
- Countries: East Germany; Soviet Union
- Language: Russian

Secrets of Nature is a compilation of English-language versions of three Soviet and one East German short documentaries about different aspects of nature. It was compiled in the United States and released there in 1950.
