= 52 Weeks Make A Year =

1955 film

52 Wochen sind ein Jahr
- Directed by: Richard Groschopp
- Written by: Richard Groschopp; Jurij Brezan
- Produced by: Hans-Joachim Schoeppe
- Starring: Hans Wehrl
- Cinematography: Joachim Hasler, Erich Gusko
- Edited by: Waltraut von Zehmen-Heinicke
- Music by: Hans Hendrik Wehding
- Production company: DEFA
- Distributed by: Progress Film
- Release date: 17 November 1955
- Running time: 88 minutes
- Country: East Germany
- Language: German

52 Weeks Make A Year (German: 52 Wochen sind ein Jahr) is a 1955 East German drama film directed by Richard Groschopp. It was shot at the Babelsberg Studios in Potsdam.

== Plot ==
In a little Sorbian village in East Germany, old farmer Krestan owns a little land and few animals, which he intends to bequeath to his daughter Lena. When the government announces a plan to collectivize all the farms, Krestan is reluctant to hand over his property, and his neighbors share his sentiments. But when they realize the great advantages of collective ownership, they happily join in.

== Cast ==
- Hans Wehrl as Krestan Serbin
- Lotte Loebinger as Serbinowa
- Irene Korb as Lena
- Kurt Oligmüller as Peter
- Erich Franz as Gessner
- Fritz Schlegel as Ladusch
- Lore Frisch as Sonja
- Fabian Wander as Herbert
- Johannes Arpe as Müller
- Dorothea Thiesing as Marta
- Aribert Grimmer as Baumann
- Hans Joachim Schölermann as Professor
- William Gade as Kubank
- Heinz Kammer as Rinke

== Production ==
The film was adapted from Jurij Brězan's novel by the same name, published in 1953. 52 Weeks Make One Year was the first East German film about the collectivization of agriculture in the country.

== Reception ==
The Socialist Unity Party of Germany's magazine, Einheit, dubbed 52 Weeks as one of the films "that were completely supportive of the struggle for German unity and against imperialism and war." Sylvia Klötzer wrote that the film was made in Socialist Realist style. Johannes von Moltke noted that while "suffused with images of rural bliss... rhythms of nature and local tradition" typical to the genre of Homeland films, 52 Weeks "is not entirely irreconcilable with the belief in progress" and is an example of the East German agrarian pictures that focused on the benefits of the collectivization. The Catholic Film Service called it "formalistic, but with good acting."
