= Im Spannungsfeld =

- Directed by: Siegfried Kühn
- Release date: 1970
- Country: East Germany
- Language: German

Im Spannungsfeld is an East German film. It was released in 1970.
