= Blaue Wimpel im Sommerwind =

1952 film

- Directed by: Herbert Ballmann
- Release date: 1952
- Country: East Germany
- Language: German

Blaue Wimpel im Sommerwind is an East German documentary film about the meeting of the Ernst Thälmann Pioneer Organization in Dresden in 1952. It was directed by Herbert Ballmann and released in 1952.
