= Elf Jahre alt =

1966 film

- Directed by: Winfried Junge
- Release date: 1966
- Country: East Germany
- Language: German

Elf Jahre alt is an East German film. It was released in 1966.
