= Die Hochzeit von Länneken =

1964 film

- Directed by: Heiner Carow
- Release date: 1964
- Country: East Germany
- Language: German

Die Hochzeit von Länneken is an East German film. It was released in 1964.
