= Polonia-Express =

1957 film

- Directed by: Kurt Jung-Alsen
- Music by: Joachim Werzlau
- Release date: 7 November 1957
- Country: East Germany
- Language: German

Polonia-Express is an East German film directed by Kurt Jung-Alsen. It was released in 1957.

== Cast ==
- Alice Graf as Hella Merkel
- Horst Schön as Fritz Marr
- Gerhard Bienert as Wilhelm Merkel
- Martin Flörchinger as Ralow
- Rudolf Ulrich as Althoff
- Hans Klering as Schwerte
- Harry Gillmann as Riemer
- Hans-Peter Minetti as Lehnert
