= Leuchtfeuer =

1954 film

- Directed by: Wolfgang Staudte
- Written by: Werner Jörg Lüddecke
- Release date: 1954
- Running time: 95 minutes
- Country: East Germany
- Language: German

Leuchtfeuer is an East German film. It was released in 1954.
