= Christel Bodenstein =

German actress (1938–2024)

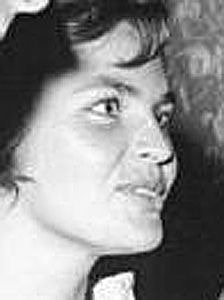
- Bodenstein in 1964
- Born: 13 October 1938; Munich, Gau Munich-Upper Bavaria, Germany
- Died: 5 December 2024 (aged 86)
- Occupation: Actress
- Years active: 1956–1991
- Spouse(s): Konrad Wolf (m. 1960; div. 1978) Hasso von Lenski

Christel Bodenstein (13 October 1938 – 5 December 2024) was a German film and television actress. She appeared in many East German (GDR) productions and is best known outside Germany for her leading role as the young princess in The Singing Ringing Tree (1957).

== Life and career ==
In 1949 she moved to Leipzig in the GDR with her mother. She attended the ballet school of the Leipzig Opera and the State Ballet School, Berlin and became a ballet dancer. She met the film director Kurt Maetzig who suggested she study acting and screen-test for a film. She then studied acting at the Academy of Film and Television in Potsdam.

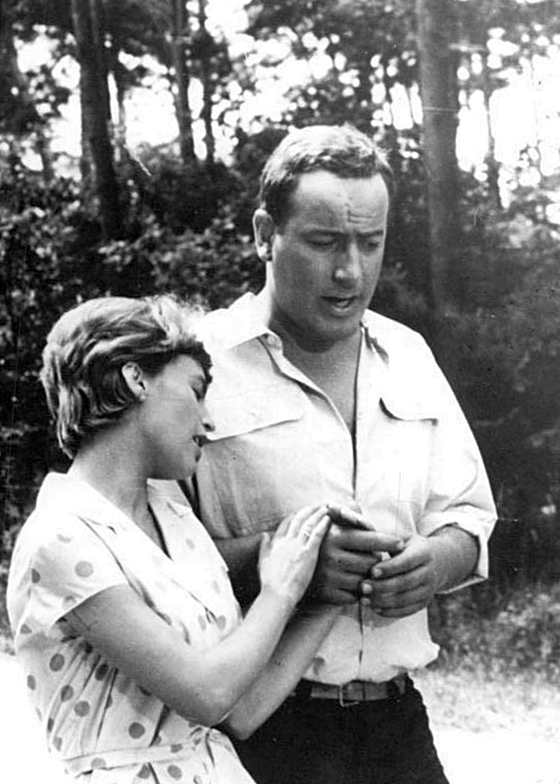
Bodenstein and Manfred Krug in Beschreibung eines Sommers, 1963

She was married from 1960 to 1978 to the director Konrad Wolf and they had a son Mirko in 1961. Her second marriage was to the actor and playwright Hasso von Lenski.

Bodenstein died on 5 December 2024, at the age of 86.

== Selected filmography ==
- The Captain from Cologne (1956)
- Das tapfere Schneiderlein (1956)
- The Singing Ringing Tree (1957)
- The Punch Bowl (1959)
- New Year's Eve Punch (1960), sequel to The Punch Bowl (1959).
- Midnight Revue (1962)
- Viel Lärm um nichts (1964)
