= Ehesache Lorenz =

1959 film

- Directed by: Joachim Kunert
- Written by: Berta Waterstradt
- Music by: André Asriel
- Release date: 1959
- Running time: 74 minutes
- Country: East Germany
- Language: German

Ehesache Lorenz is an East German film. It was released in 1959.
