= Genesung =

1956 film

- Directed by: Konrad Wolf
- Written by: Karl-Georg Egel; Paul Wiens
- Music by: Joachim Werzlau
- Release date: 16 February 1956 (East Germany)
- Running time: 105 minutes
- Country: East Germany
- Language: German

Genesung is an East German film. It was released in 1956.
