= Der Teufel vom Mühlenberg =

1955 film

- Directed by: Herbert Ballmann
- Starring: Eva Kotthaus; Hans-Peter Minetti
- Music by: Joachim Werzlau
- Release date: 1955
- Country: East Germany
- Language: German

Der Teufel vom Mühlenberg is an East German film. It was released in 1955, and sold 4,301,895 tickets.
