= Günther Haack =

German actor

Günther Haack (1929–1965) was a German actor.

== Selected filmography ==
- Alarm in the Circus (1954)
- The Czar and the Carpenter (1956)
- Don't Forget My Little Traudel (1957)
- Das hölzerne Kälbchen (1960)
- Christine (1963)
