= Always on Duty =

1959 film

Zu jeder Stunde
- Directed by: Heinz Thiel
- Written by: Lothar Dutombé
- Produced by: Siegfried Nürnberger
- Starring: Rolf Stövesand
- Cinematography: Erwin Anders
- Edited by: Wally Gurschke
- Music by: Helmut Nier
- Production company: DEFA
- Distributed by: Progress Film
- Release date: 29 January 1960
- Running time: 85 minutes
- Country: East Germany
- Language: German

Zu jeder Stunde (English-language title: Always On Duty) is an East German black-and-white film, directed by Heinz Thiel. It was released in 1960.

== Plot ==
Border Troops soldier Martin arrives in a village on the Inner German border. He falls in love with a local girl, Renate. Her father is opposed to their relationship, having promised her to the son of farmer Grabow. When Grabow plans to leave to the West with the aid of corrupt officer Zimmer, Martin discovers their plans and informs his superiors, although Zimmer has been his friend.

== Cast ==
- Rolf Stövesand as Martin Kraft
- Erika Radtke as Renate Wedel
- Hans-Peter Minetti as Hermann Höhne
- Roman Silberstein as Heinz Tröger
- Manfred Borgesas Schlegel
- Erich Franz as Otto Grabow
- Otmar Richter as Felix Grabow
- Rolf Ripperger as Fred Wedel
- Hans Finohr as Arthur Wedel
- Fritz Diez as Father Kraft, the priest
- Werner Lierck as Köhler
- Josef Stauder as Schröder
- Horst Kube as Erich Willembrot
- Harry Hindemith as Marian Klein

== Production ==
The DEFA Commission reviewed 58 scripts proposed for filming in the years 1959/60. Four of those were considered "aesthetic films", and were all centered on portraying Christians as backward and reactionary. The one script eventually authorized by State Secretary of Cinema Erich Wendt evolved into Always on Duty. However, the improvement in church and state relations in East Germany during 1960 prompted several changes in the plot, and the antagonists were not presented as devout Catholics.

== Reception ==
Miera and Antonin Liehm cited Zu Jeder Stunde as one of DEFA's "contemporary socialist films." The Der Monat journal's critic wrote that while viewing the film, "the public could be impressed by the alertness of the Border Troops." The German Film Lexicon regarded it as "unassuming, propagandistic, unpersuasive and artistically weak, as well as full of stereotypes."
