= Hart am Wind =

1970 East German film

- Directed by: Heinz Thiel
- Release date: 1970
- Country: East Germany
- Language: German

Hart am Wind is an East German film. It was released in 1970.
