= Seilergasse 8 =

1960 film

- Directed by: Joachim Kunert
- Music by: André Asriel
- Release date: 1960
- Country: East Germany
- Language: German

Seilergasse 8 is an East German film. It was released in 1960.
