= Die Schönste =

1957 film

- Directed by: Ernesto Remani
- Release date: 1957
- Running time: 86 Minutes
- Country: East Germany
- Language: German

Die Schönste is an East German film. It was completed in 1957, but was never shown publicly due to censorship. After reunification it was recreated and in this form had its premiere in 2002.

== Plot ==
Two boys in West Berlin steal their own mothers' jewellery to find out whether the ladies are still admired without these adornments.
