= Karl Plintzner =

German cinematographer

Karl Plintzner (1911–1975) was a German cinematographer. He worked largely for DEFA, the state-owned East German studio.

== Selected filmography ==
- Blum Affair (1948)
- The Marriage of Figaro (1949)
- The Merry Wives of Windsor (1950)
- The Last Year (1951)
- Stärker als die Nacht (1954)
- The Singing Ringing Tree (1957)
- Intrigue and Love (1959)
- Erich Kubak (1959)
- New Year's Eve Punch (1960)

== Bibliography ==
- Poss, Ingrid & Warnecke, Peter. Spur der Filme: Zeitzeugen über die DEFA. Ch. Links Verlag, 2006.
