= Star mit fremden Federn =

1955 film

- Release date: 1955
- Country: East Germany
- Language: German

Star mit fremden Federn is an East German film. It was released in 1955.
