= Spur in die Nacht =

1957 film

- Directed by: Günter Reisch
- Release date: 1957
- Country: East Germany
- Language: German

Spur in die Nacht (English: Trace in the Night) is an East German film, directed by Günter Reisch. It was released in 1957.
