= Die Liebe und der Co-Pilot =

1961 film

- Directed by: Richard Groschopp
- Release date: 1961
- Country: East Germany
- Language: German

Die Liebe und der Co-Pilot is a 1961 East German romantic comedy film directed by Richard Groschopp.
