= Der Arzt von Bothenow =

1961 film

- Directed by: Johannes Knittel
- Release date: 23 June 1961
- Country: East Germany
- Language: German

Der Arzt von Bothenow is an East German film directed by Johannes Knittel. It was released in 1961.
