= Konrad Wolf =

East German film director (1925–1982)

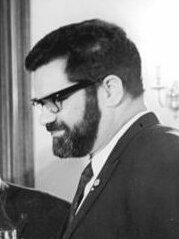
- Wolf in 1970
- Born: 20 October 1925; Hechingen, Germany
- Died: 7 March 1982 (aged 56); East Berlin, East Germany
- Occupation: Film director
- Years active: 1954–1982
- Spouse: Christel Bodenstein (1960–1978)
- Parent: Friedrich Wolf
- Relatives: Markus Wolf (brother)

Konrad Wolf (20 October 1925 – 7 March 1982) was an East German film director. He was the son of writer, doctor and diplomat Friedrich Wolf, and the younger brother of Stasi spymaster Markus Wolf. "Koni" was his nickname.

== Biography ==
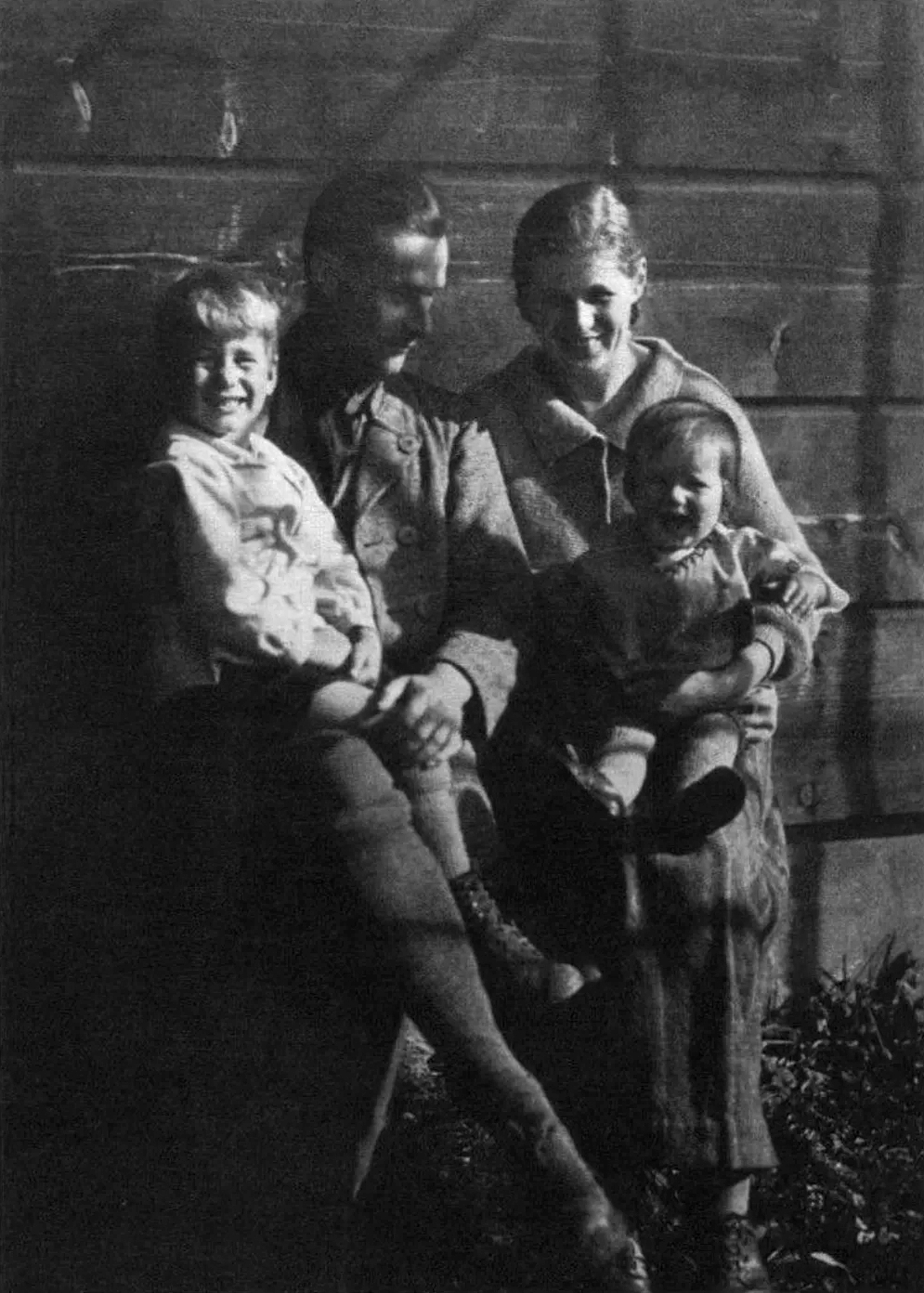
Friedrich Wolf with his wife Else and their sons Markus (left) and Konrad (right), 1926

Because his father was Jewish and was an ardent and outspoken member of the German Communist Party (KPD) since 1928, he and his family left Germany via Austria, Switzerland, and France for Moscow when the Nazis took power in March 1933, where, arriving in March 1934, Wolf came into intense contact with Soviet film.

At age 10, he played a minor role in the film Kämpfer, filmed among the German Communist emigrants in Moscow. In 1936, his family became Soviet citizens but then fell under suspicion leading to his father leaving for Spain in 1937 to serve as a doctor in the International Brigades during the Spanish Civil War. (Note: Following the defeat of the Republicans in the Spanish Civil War, Friedrich Wolf was interned as a refugee at Camp Vernet, which repressively interned Germans, Communists, Soviet citizens, members of the International Brigades, etc. as "suspect foreigners" from February 1939 until September 1939 and, after the fall of France in June 1940, it was a concentration camp in Vichy France. Following the signing of the non aggression pact between Nazi Germany and the Soviet Union, he returned to Moscow in 1941, helped broadcast anti-Nazi radio propaganda in German to Nazi troops during World War II and helped found the National Committee for a Free Germany.) He and his older brother attended the Karl Liebknecht School in Moscow.

He became friends with Louis Fischer's son Viktor Fischer and Wilhelm Wloch's son Lothar Wloch (1923–1976) who was later a German building contractor. (Note: In 1989, Markus Wolf wrote about the three friends Koni, Vik, and Lothar in The Troika.) In December 1942 at age 17, he volunteered into the Red Army, was sent to the front as an interpreter, served in the Caucasus campaigns, was present for the liberation of Warsaw, and was among the first troops to reach Berlin in 1945. After the war, he was a cultural officer at Halle and Berlin and was a reporter for the Berliner Zeitung which began publishing again on 21 May 1945. He remained in the Soviet Army until 1948. He later described these events in the 1968 film, Ich war neunzehn (I Was Nineteen).

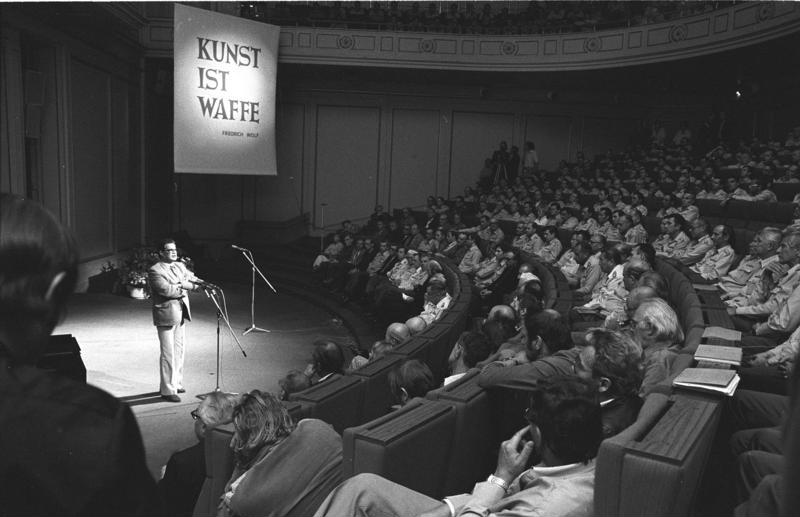
Konrad Wolf addressing NVA soldiers in 1981, under the motto Kunst ist Waffe ("art is weapon", a quote from his father Friedrich Wolf).

Shortly after the war, Wolf returned to Moscow, where he studied at VGIK and was perplexed about whether he should be German or Russian and then live in Germany or the Soviet Union. His 1959 film Sterne (German: Stars) won the Special Jury Prize at the 1959 Cannes Film Festival. In 1961, his film Professor Mamlock was entered into the 2nd Moscow International Film Festival where it won the Golden Prize.

His 1971 film, Goya or the Hard Way to Enlightenment was entered into the 7th Moscow International Film Festival where it won a Special Prize.

He worked afterwards as a film director at DEFA. He was honorary president of the Union of Art from 1959 until 1966, and president of the DDR Academy of Arts, Berlin from 1965 until his death in 1982.

In 1978, he was a member of the jury at the 28th Berlin International Film Festival. In 1980, his film Solo Sunny was entered into the 30th Berlin International Film Festival.

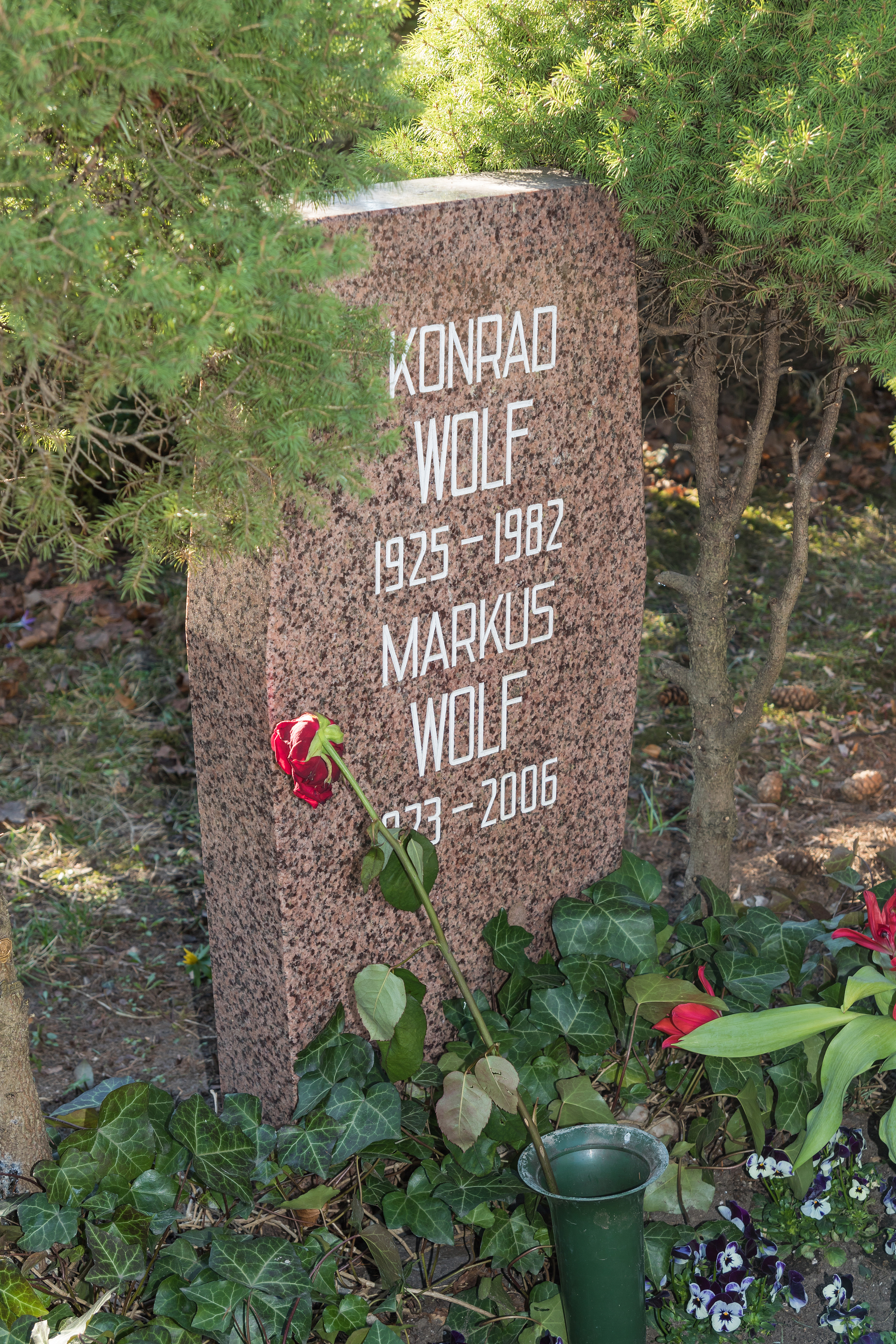
Grave in Zentralfriedhof Friedrichsfelde.

Wolf died on 7 March 1982. He was married to the actress Christel Bodenstein from 1960 to 1978. He was cremated and honoured with burial in the Pergolenweg Ehrengrab section of Berlin's Friedrichsfelde Cemetery.

== Films ==
- 1955: Once Is Never
- 1956: Genesung
- 1957: Lissy
- 1958/1972: Sun Seekers
- 1959: Stars
- 1960: Leute mit Flügeln
- 1961: Professor Mamlock
- 1964: Divided Heaven
- 1966: Der kleine Prinz (1966) (TV film)
- 1968: I Was Nineteen
- 1971: Goya or the Hard Way to Enlightenment
- 1974: Der nackte Mann auf dem Sportplatz
- 1976: Mama, I'm Alive
- 1979: Solo Sunny (co-director: Wolfgang Kohlhaase)
- 1981/1982: Busch singt (6-part documentary about Ernst Busch, completed by others)

== See also ==
- Konrad Wolf Prize

== Notes ==
Trade union offices
Preceded by Heinrich Allmeroth	President of the Union of Art; 1959–1966	Succeeded by Hans-Peter Minetti
