= Erich Kubak =

1959 film

- Directed by: Johannes Arpe
- Cinematography: Karl Plintzner
- Release date: 1959
- Running time: 86 minutes
- Country: East Germany
- Language: German

Erich Kubak is an East German film. It was released in 1959.

== Story ==
A film about lignite strip mining.
