= Die Jagd nach dem Stiefel =

1962 film

- Directed by: Konrad Petzold
- Written by: Hans-Albert Pederzani, Konrad Petzold, Max Zimmering
- Produced by: Deutsche Film (DEFA)
- Cinematography: Siegfried Hönicke
- Edited by: Ilse Peters
- Music by: Günter Hauk
- Distributed by: Progress Film
- Release dates: 17 August 1962 (East Germany); 17 January 1964 (Czechoslovakia)
- Running time: 85 minutes
- Country: East Germany
- Language: German

Die Jagd nach dem Stiefel is an East German film. It was released in 1962.

== Plot ==
A fight breaks out between KPD (communist) and SA (nazi) men during the 1932 Reichstag election. KPD man Ernst "Juhle" Schiemann is found dead a few hours later. When the police find a cosh/blackjack on his comrade Büttner, they accuse him of murder. Because his son Jack doesn't believe that his father is a murderer, he and his friends, who call themselves Redties, go in search of the real culprit. They use the impression of the sole of a boot, which can only come from the murderer. Although their efforts are hampered by a rival gang, the Redties are ultimately successful and the actual killer is identified. SA man Müller and his companion Bullrich are handed over to the police; Büttner is acquitted.
