= Der Ochse von Kulm =

1955 film

- Directed by: Martin Hellberg
- Cinematography: Eugen Klagemann
- Edited by: Gisela Klagemann
- Music by: Günter Klück
- Release date: 1955
- Running time: 88 minutes
- Country: East Germany
- Language: German

Der Ochse von Kulm is an East German film. It was released in 1955, and sold more than 4,100,000 tickets.

== Cast ==
- Thea Aichbichler - Therese
- Ferdinand Anton - Alois
- Franz Arzdorf - Chef des Landwirtschaftsamtes
- Bruno Atlas-Eising - Bauer
- Wolfgang Bachmann - Beamter
- Waltraud Backmann - Amerikanerin
- Ingrid Barkmann - Wirtin der Bayrischen Bierstube
- Richard Bendey - Postbote
- Rolf Bergmann - Amerikaner
- Trude Brentina - Bäuerin
- Werner Buttler - Polizist
- Charlotte Böttge - Bäuerin
- Lotte Crusius - Bäuerin
- Hannes Cujath - Militärpolizist
- Jac Diehl - Gemeindediener
