= Ročník 21 =

1958 film

- Directed by: Václav Gajer
- Release date: 1958
- Countries: Czechoslovakia, East Germany
- Language: German

Ročník 21 (German title: Jahrgang 21, English title: Those Born in 21) is a Czechoslovak-East German film directed by Václav Gajer. It was released in 1958 one year after its production.

== Premise ==
Honzík, a young Czech, falls in love with Käthe, a German nurse, during his time as a forced labourer in Germany.

== Cast ==
- Luděk Munzar, Honzík
- Eva Kotthaus, Käthe
- Stanislav Fischer, Mirek
- Herbert Körbs
- Jaroslava Tvrzníková

== Production ==
The film is an adaptation of Ročník jedenadvacet, a 1953 Czech novel by Karel Ptáčník.

Ročník 21's original official distributor presented it as follows:

The generation born in the early 1920s suffered great misfortune - during the occupation they were forced to work in the Reich. The young men worked there in grueling conditions, clearing the debris of air raids. But they were not ruled by blind hatred: one of the heroes was overwhelmed while trying to save a small child, and in the hospital he met a sympathetic German nurse, obviously anti-Nazi.

"The film was created in cooperation between the Barrandov Film Studio and the East German studio DEFA as one of [Czech film industry] first international co-productions. It was filmed partly in the original exteriors of bombed-out Dresden."

== Release ==
Ročník 21 premiered on February, 2 1958.

== Reception ==
Audiences' response in East Germany is said to have been "reserved" but "Walter Ulbricht praised the movie".

Ročník 21 has been described as "having captured the fate of a generation". "This romance filmed in the austere style of Italian neo-realism, without idealisation and pathos of Gajer's previous films, portrays the stories of Czech boys taken to Germany where they become forced workers."
