= Gefährliche Fracht =

1954 film

- Directed by: Gustav von Wangenheim
- Release date: 1954
- Running time: 96 minutes
- Country: East Germany
- Language: German

Gefährliche Fracht is an East German film. It was released in 1954.
