= Karl Gass =

German film director

Karl Gass (2 February 1917, Mannheim, Grand Duchy of Baden – 29 January 2009) was a German documentary filmmaker.

He was a soldier in the elite Panzer-Grenadier-Division Großdeutschland of the Wehrmacht throughout the duration of WW2, where he served as a lieutenant on the Western and Eastern campaigns, until he was captured by the British with the defeat of Nazi Germany. After being released from captivity after the war, he became a documentary maker. With over 120 films, he was among the most productive documentary directors of the GDR, and produced DEFA documentaries. He had the idea for the DEFA long term documentary "Die Kinder von Golzow" (The children of Golzow). He was born in Mannheim and died in Kleinmachnow, aged 91. According to Frank Pergande, Gass was "one of the most influential propagandists" of the state.
