= Kurt Jung-Alsen =

German film director

- Born: 18 June 1915; Tutzing, German Empire
- Died: 20 December 1976 (aged 61)
- Occupations: Film director Screenwriter
- Years active: 1954-1976

Kurt Jung-Alsen (18 June 1915 – 20 December 1976) was a German film director and screenwriter. He directed 24 films between 1954 and 1976.

== Selected filmography ==
- The Call of the Sea (1951)
- Duped Till Doomsday (1957)
- Polonia-Express (1957)
