= Heiner Carow =

German film director

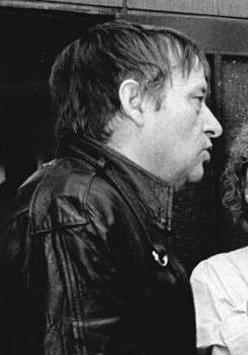
- Born: 19 September 1929; Rostock, Free State of Mecklenburg-Schwerin, Germany
- Died: 1 February 1997 (aged 67); Potsdam, Germany
- Occupations: Film director, screenwriter
- Years active: 1952–1997
- Spouse: Evelyn Carow

Heinrich "Heiner" Carow (19 September 1929 – 1 February 1997) was a German film director and screenwriter.

== Early life and education ==
Heinrich Carow was born on 19 September 1929 in Rostock, Mecklenburg, Germany. He became known as "Heiner".

== Career ==
Carow's 1986 film So Many Dreams was entered into the 37th Berlin International Film Festival.

In 1987, he was a member of the jury at the 38th Berlin International Film Festival.

In 1990, his film Coming Out won the Silver Bear for an outstanding artistic contribution at the 40th Berlin International Film Festival.

== Death and legacy ==
Carow died on 1 February 1997, aged 67, in Berlin. His grave is located in Babelsberg.

The Heiner Carow Prize (for best German young film) was established by the DEFA Foundation in 2013. It is awarded to films shown in the Panorama program of the Berlin International Film Festival. In 2024, Eva Trobisch won the prize for her film Ivo.

== Selected filmography ==
- Sheriff Teddy (1957)
- Sie nannten ihn Amigo (1959)
- Die Hochzeit von Länneken (1964)
- The Legend of Paul and Paula (1973)
- So Many Dreams (1986)
- Coming Out (1989)
- Begräbnis einer Gräfin (1992, TV film)
- The Mistake (1992)
- Vater Mutter Mörderkind (1993, TV film)
- Fähre in den Tod (1996, TV film)
