= Werner Dissel =

German actor and director (1912–2003)

- Born: 26 August 1912; Cologne, German Empire
- Died: 22 January 2003 (aged 90); Potsdam, Federal Republic of Germany
- Occupation: Actor
- Years active: 1945–2002

Werner Friedrich Dissel (26 August 1912 – 22 January 2003) was a German actor, director, and resistance fighter against the Nazi regime.

== Biography ==
Dissel's began working as a newspaper photographer in the late 1920s. After the Nazis' rise to power, he became a member of an antifascist group headed by Harro Schulze-Boysen, and was involved in the resistance newspaper Wille zum Reich. Dissel was caught and imprisoned from 1937 to 1939. During his time in prison, the Gestapo arranged for Boysen to visit him, in the hope that something incriminating would be said while the two would be left alone in a tapped room; Boysen passed a cigarette pack to Dissel, on which he wrote that the police had no concrete evidence against him. After his release, Boysen convinced him to volunteer into the Wehrmacht, so he could "destroy Hitler's army from within". Dissel joined the armed forces shortly before the German Invasion of Poland, and served in a military meteorology unit. At 1942, he barely avoided an arrest during the Gestapo's crackdown on the Red Orchestra.

After the war, he openly joined the KPD and decided to pursue his old dream to become an actor. Dissel joined a cabaret in Wiesbaden, and in 1950 emigrated to East Germany. There he appeared in numerous plays, TV shows and movies. He worked with the Berliner Ensemble, DEFA and DFF. He continued his acting career after the reunification. In total, he appeared in more than a hundred film and television productions.

He received the Art Prize of the German Democratic Republic at a collective awarding in October 1986.

== Selected filmography ==
- 1954: Ernst Thälmann
- 1956: Die Millionen der Yvette - Zeitungsverkäufer
- 1956: The Captain from Cologne
- 1958: Les Misérables - Brevet
- 1958: Ein Mädchen von 16 ½ - Rohn
- 1959: Goods For Catalonia - Portier
- 1959: Bevor der Blitz einschlägt - Sylvio O. Schmitt - Kunstkritiker
- 1959: Love's Confusion - 2. Taxichauffeur
- 1959: The Goodies
- 1960: The Opportunists - Fario
- 1961: Die Liebe und der Co-Pilot - Meteorologe
- 1961: Der Fremde
- 1961: The Gleiwitz Case - Volksschullehrer
- 1961: Ärzte
- 1962: Rotkäppchen - Wolf
- 1963: Naked among Wolves - Otto Lange
- 1963: Jetzt und in der Stunde meines Todes - Herr Merker
- 1964: Die Maskierten - Sheriff McElliott
- 1964: Pension Boulanka - Dr. Vollmer
- 1965: Solange Leben in mir ist - Bethmann-Hollweg
- 1965: Denk bloß nicht, ich heule - Mantek
- 1966: Schwarze Panther
- 1966: Zejscie do piekla - Rudolf Knoll
- 1967: Geschichten jener Nacht - Kilian (segment "Materna")
- 1968: Heroin - Zollrat Donkenberg
- 1971: Liberation III: Direction of the Main Blow - Alfred Jodl
- 1974: Ulzana - Mexikanischer Arzt
- 1974: Johannes Kepler - Richter
- 1975: Am Ende der Welt - Amtsdiener Göpel
- 1975: Till Eulenspiegel - Scholastischer Professor
- 1976: Mann gegen Mann - Angler
- 1976: Beethoven - Tage aus einem Leben - Grisslinger
- 1978: Rotschlipse
- 1980: Levins Mühle - Plontke
- 1980: Johann Sebastian Bach's Futile Journey to Fame - Vater Nichelmann
- 1984: Kaskade rückwärts - Gast
- 1986: Der Traum vom Elch - Paulchen
- 1987: Stielke, Heinz, fünfzehn... - Invalide
- 1987: Kindheit - Lehrer
- 1988: Fallada: The Last Chapter - Doktor
- 1989: Coming Out - Older homosexual man (Walter)
- 1989: Der Magdalenenbaum - Opa Panse
- 1990: Die Architekten - Alter
- 1990: Grönland - Professor Kah
- 1991: Begräbnis einer Gräfin - Merz
- 1992: All Lies - Notar
- 1992: Mau Mau
- 1992: Verlorene Landschaft
- 1992: The Mystery of the Amber Room
- 1992: Der Besucher - Blind man
- 1994: Heller Tag
- 2000: Anatomy - Paula's Grandfather
