= Heimliche Ehen =

1956 East German comedy film

- Original theatrical poster
- Directed by: Gustav von Wangenheim
- Starring: Paul Heidemann
- Cinematography: Eugen Klagemann
- Edited by: Wally Gurschke
- Music by: Günter Kochan
- Release date: 27 January 1956
- Running time: 93 minutes
- Country: East Germany
- Language: German

Heimliche Ehen is a 1956 East German comedy film directed by Gustav von Wangenheim. It stars Paul Heidemann and Gerd Michael Henneberg.

== Cast ==
- Paul Heidemann as Trucks
- Gerd Michael Henneberg as Fischer
- Siegfried Hömke as Junger Bauer
- Helga Jordan as Hanni
- Hans Klering as Knetsch
- Waltraud Kogel as Sekretärin Sellger
- Gisela Kugland as Sekretärin
- Franz Kutschera as Raugraff
- Otto Lange as Bauer
- Marga Legal as Frau Oberlin
- Werner Lierck as Fahrer Max
- Erich Loesche as Maurer
- Armin Mueller-Stahl as Norbert
- Wilhelm Nickel as Alter Wächter
- Reinhold Pasch as Mitarbeiter Lehmann
