= Rolf Ludwig =

German actor

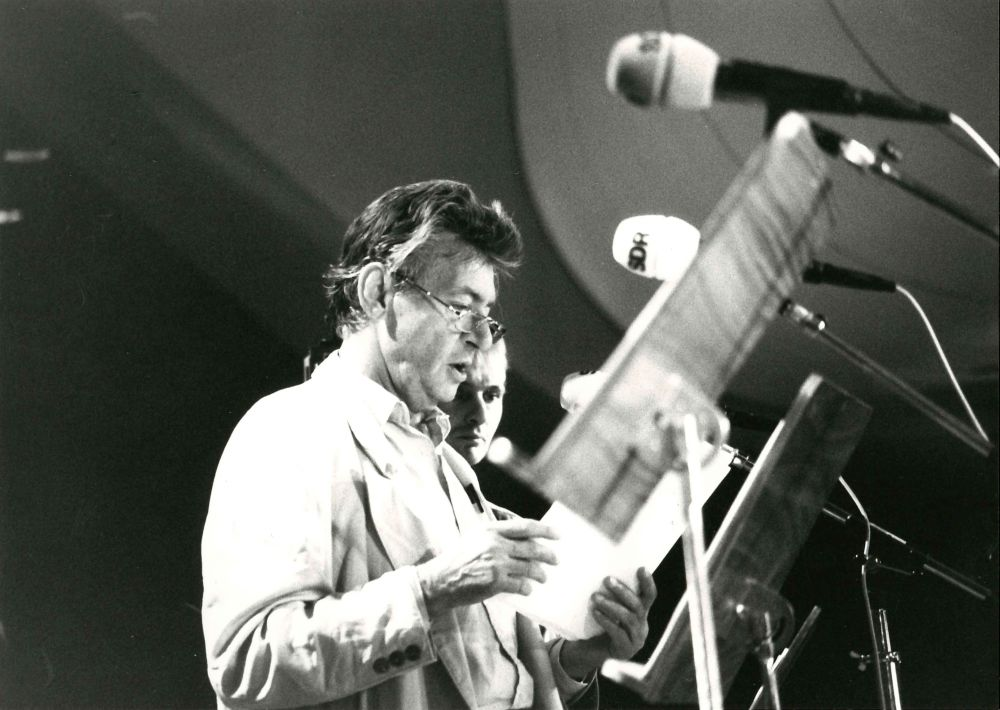
- Ludwig in 1990
- Born: 28 July 1925; Stockholm, Sweden
- Died: 27 March 1999 (aged 73); Berlin, Germany
- Occupation: Actor
- Years active: 1952–1997

Rolf Ludwig (28 July 1925 – 27 March 1999) was a German actor. He appeared in more than one hundred films from 1952 to 1997, performed on stage and did radio productions as well. Ludwig was awarded the National Prize, 2nd degree, for art and literature, for his achievements.

== Selected filmography ==
Year	Title	Role	Notes
1956	The Captain from Cologne	Albert Hauptmann	
1956	Mich dürstet	Cerefino	
1956	Thomas Muentzer	Valtin Spatz	
1956	The Mayor of Zalamea	Rebolledo	
1959	Special Mission	Arendt	
1959	Der kleine Kuno	The reporter	
1959	The Tinder Box	The soldier	
1961	The Gleiwitz Case	SS medical doctor	
1964	Viel Lärm um nichts	Benedikt	
1965	Solange Leben in mir ist	von Preuß	
1966	The Escape in the Silent	Karl Reinhold	
1969	Seine Hoheit – Genosse Prinz	Kaspar Mai / Eitel Friedrich Prince of Hohenlohe-Liebenstein	
1969	Jungfer, Sie gefällt mir (based on Kleist's The Broken Jug)	Licht (the judge's secretary)	
1972	Her Third	Hrdlitschka	
1973	The Legend of Paul and Paula	The Professor	
1974	Lotte in Weimar (based on T. Mann's novel)	Mager, the waiter	
1980	The Fiancee	Prison doctor	
1984	Where Others Keep Silent	Gustav	
1991	Stein	Ernst Stein	
