= Jürgen Degenhardt =

German songwriter, actor director (1930–2014)

Hans-Jürgen Degenhardt (21 October 1930 in Dresden – 1 August 2014) was a German songwriter, actor, director and author. He was considered a successful German writer of musical comedies.

On 1 August 2014 he died of cancer in Erfurt.

== Filmography ==
- 1955: Hotelboy Ed Martin
- 1957: Polonia-Express
- 1958: Geschwader Fledermaus

== Theatre ==
- 1953: Roger Vailland: Colonel Foster ist schuldig – director: Herwart Grosse/Wolfgang Langhoff (Deutsches Theater Berlin, Kammerspiele)
- 1953: Julius Hays: Der Putenhirt (Otto) – director: Fritz Wendel (Deutsches Theater Berlin, Kammerspiele)
- 1956: Peter Hacks: Eröffnung des indischen Zeitalters – director: Ernst Kahler (Deutsches Theater Berlin)
