= Viel Lärm um nichts =

1964 East German film

- Directed by: Martin Hellberg
- Written by: Martin Hellberg, William Shakespeare (play Much Ado About Nothing)
- Cinematography: Erwin Anders
- Edited by: Ursula Rudzki
- Music by: Wilhelm Neef
- Release date: 1964
- Running time: 97 minutes
- Country: East Germany
- Language: German

Viel Lärm um nichts is an East German film based on William Shakespeare's play Much Ado About Nothing. It was released in 1964.

== Cast ==
- Christel Bodenstein: Beatrice
- Rolf Ludwig: Benedikt
- Wilfried Ortmann: Don Pedro
- Martin Flörchinger: Leonato
- Gerhard Rachold: Don Juan
- Arno Wyzniewski: Claudio
- Ursula Körbs: Hero
- Carl Balhaus: Antonio
- Ingrid Michalk: Margareta
- Heidi Ortner: Ursula
- Ekkehard Hahn: Balthasar
- Edwin Marian: Borachio
- Gerhard Bienert: Holzapfel
- Rudolf Ulrich: Schleewein
- Fred Delmare: Wachsoldat Haberkuchen
