= Karin Hübner =

German actress

- Born: 16 September 1936; Gera, Germany
- Died: 25 July 2006 (aged 69); Munich, Germany
- Occupation: Actress
- Years active: 1955-1987

Karin Hübner (pronounced [ˈkaːʁiːn ˈhyːbnɐ]; 16 September 1936 – 25 July 2006) was a German stage, film, and television actress. She appeared in more than forty films from 1955 to 1977. Her name is sometimes given as Karin Huebner.

Hübner was born in Gera in Thuringia and grew up in Michendorf, near Berlin (in East Germany after 1945). Her parents were both opera singers. She studied at the Max Reinhardt School of Drama in Berlin. Her first major stage role was as Piroschka at the Hebbel Theater, in 1958; that same year she made her film debut in the title role of Martin Hellberg's production of Lessing's work Emilia Galotti.

Her most famous role was as Eliza Doolittle in the musical play My Fair Lady. She starred in the German-language premiere of the musical, in 1961, at the Theater des Westens (Theatre of the West) in Berlin. Berlin was then in the depths of the Cold War, the Berlin Wall had just been erected, and My Fair Lady was the first production since World War II of a major original Broadway musical in Berlin, so the production was quite important to the cultural life and morale of Berlin, and Hübner was accordingly celebrated. She played the role about 850 times in Berlin, Hamburg, Munich, Vienna and Zurich. Hübner never regained the heights of her fame and success as Eliza Doolittle, although she remained a sought-after stage and film star and played many other roles.

Hübner was married three times – to film director Peter Beauvais (with whom she had a daughter, Dana Beauvais), actor Günter Pfitzmann, and musician Frank Duval – and was at times personally troubled (she set fire to her apartment in 1982 in a drunken suicide attempt, and was sentenced to six months in prison for arson). She retired from the stage in 1987 and settled in Munich, where she died in 2006.

== Selected filmography ==
- Emilia Galotti (1958), as Emilia Galotti
- Headquarters State Secret (1960), as Madeleine Dartein
- The Miracle of Father Malachia (1961), as Nelly Moorbach
- The Merry Widow (1962), as Hanna Hofer
- The Endless Night (1963), as Lisa
- Liselotte of the Palatinate (1966), as Princess Palatine
- Flucht ohne Ausweg (1967, TV miniseries), as Sandra
- The Man with the Glass Eye (1969), as Yvonne Duval
- Seven Days Grace (1969), as Mrs. Muhl
- Hotel Royal (1969, TV film), as Rose Charpentier
- Das Messer (1971, TV miniseries), as Mary Jones
- Viola and Sebastian (1972)
- Tatort: Das Mädchen am Klavier (1977, TV), as Dr. Hildegard Förster

== Selected discography ==
Albums

- Original cast, including Karin Hübner: My Fair Lady (1962, Philips)
- Karin Huebner, Franco Duval, Und Dana Singen Melodien Aus Walt-Disney-Filmen (Karin Huebner, Franco Duval, and Dana [Beauvais] Sing Melodies from Walt Disney Films; 1966, Philips)
- Cast, including Karin Hübner: Die Dreigroschenoper (The Three-Penny Opera' 1978, Philips)

Singles and EPs

- Karin Huebner Singt Aus "My Fair Lady" (Karin Huebner Sings From "My Fair Lady"; EP, 1962, Philips)
- Karin Huebner Franco Duval + Dana Singen Aus "Mary Poppins" (Karin Huebner, Franco Duval, and Dana [Beauvais] Sing From "Mary Poppins"; EP, 1966, Philips)
- Mein Haus Ist Dein Haus (My House is Your House; single, 1972, Columbia)
