= An Old Love =

1959 film

Eine alte Liebe
- Directed by: Frank Beyer
- Written by: Werner Reinowski; Frank Beyer
- Produced by: Erich Albrecht
- Starring: Gisela May
- Cinematography: Günter Marczinkowsky
- Edited by: Evelyn Carow
- Music by: Joachim Werzlau
- Production company: DEFA
- Distributed by: Progress Film
- Release date: 4 October 1959
- Running time: 92 minutes
- Country: East Germany
- Language: German

An Old Love (German: Eine alte Liebe) is an East German black-and-white film, directed by Frank Beyer. It was released in 1959.

== Plot ==
Frieda Walkowiak is an ambitious director of a collective farm. Although she is talented and hard-working, the men in the commune are reluctant to accept her as their supervisor. August, Frieda's husband, is exasperated by his wife's devotion to her office, which leads to her being absent from home quite often. After she misses their wedding anniversary, August is enraged, and leaves their home with their daughter. Frieda is badly depressed and suffers a breakdown. She is taken to a hospital. August hears of this, comes back to his senses and returns. The family reunites.

== Cast ==
- Gisela May as Frieda Walkowiak
- Erich Franz as August Walkowiak
- Doris Abeßer as Helga
- Ezard Haußmann as Lothar
- Peter Sturm as Heinrich Rantsch
- Hans-Peter Minetti as Benno Schulze
- Margot Ebert as Irmgard Strömer
- Harry Gillman as Otto Funke
- Werner Lierck as Räupke
- Rudolf Ulrich as Georg
- Günther Simon as first secretary of the party branch
- J.P. Dornseif as Uhland
- Jochen Thomas as Christopher Schwannecke
- Hans Finohr as old Schwannecke
- Peter Kalisch as Besecke

== Production ==
The film was made in accordance with the demands set forth by the East German establishment in the Cultural Conference of October 1957 and in the 2nd Cinema Conference of July 1958. Both called on filmmakers to concentrate on the theme of collectivization in agriculture, on the background of the ongoing campaign to establish the communal farms. The script was based on a story by Werner Reinowski. It was Frank Beyer's second film.

== Reception ==
PROGRESS-Film Verleih, the distributor of An Old Love, promoted the picture as "one that should be viewed in every village."

The West German Catholic Film Service defined the film as a "well-played film... but completely devoted to its political aim." Anke Pinkert noted that An Old Love made a subtle reference to the subjects of post-war displacement and to the bombings during World War II, that were both very controversial at the time. Joshua Feinstein cited it as one of the earliest East German pictures that had a female protagonist. Thomas Koebner wrote that the film was clearly a "vehicle of propaganda to promote the collectivization". Beyer himself referred to it as "not very good."

In 1960, after the last independent farmers became members of the collectives, the film was removed from circulation.
