= Gerd Michael Henneberg =

German actor and theater director (1922–2011)

- Born: Gerhard Otto Henneberg; July 14, 1922; Magdeburg, Weimar Republic
- Died: January 1, 2011 (aged 88); Berlin, Federal Republic of Germany
- Occupations: Actor, theater director, theater manager
- Years active: 1937–1997

Gerd Michael Henneberg (14 July 1922 – 1 January 2011) was a German actor and theater director.

== Biography ==
Gerd Henneberg's father, Richard, was a theater director. After the young Henneberg took private acting classes, he debuted on stage at age sixteen at the Leipzig Theater. Afterwards, he worked in the Aschaffenburg Theater and later became a member of the cast at the German National Theater in Weimar, where he remained until after the end of World War II.

In 1948, Henneberg moved to East Berlin. He appeared on the stages of the Schiffbauerdamm Theater and the People's Theater, but finally settled in the Maxim Gorky Theater. Henneberg's most recognized performance was that of Scanlon of One Flew Over the Cuckoo's Nest, a character he depicted more than four hundred times. On 5 October 1960, he was awarded the People's Artist Prize. In 1960, he was named manager of the Neustrelitz Theater. In February 1962 he assumed the same duties in the Dresden Theater.

Henneberg was removed from the latter post in October 1965, after the Socialist Unity Party of Germany disapproved of several plays he allowed to be performed and from the lack of cooperation with communist writers. He was criticized for lacking "socialist ardor," and had to announce that he left due to "failing to make a contribution to Socialist dramaturgy." Henneberg returned to Neustrelitz, where he remained as manager until 1968. He continued to direct plays and to perform in the Maxim Gorky Theater until the 1980s, and made his last appearance on stage in Dresden in 1997.

Beside his theatrical work, he also appeared in some sixty cinema and television productions, mostly East German ones. He is mostly remembered for portraying Wilhelm Keitel in all of Yuri Ozerov's World War II films and for making several guest appearances in the popular crime drama Polizeiruf 110.

After a prolonged illness, Henneberg died on New Year's Day 2011.

== Partial filmography ==
- Hexen (1954) - Staudten-Enderlein
- Heimliche Ehen (1956) - Fischer
- Thomas Müntzer (1956) - Evangelischer Pfarrer
- Das tapfere Schneiderlein (1956) - Schatzmeister Gier
- Die Millionen der Yvette (1956) - Offizier
- The Crucible (1957) - Herrick
- Lissy (1957) - Staudinger
- Berlin – Ecke Schönhauser… (1957) - Amerikaner
- Spielbank-Affäre (1957) - Reporter
- Der Fackelträger (1957) - Schulze IV
- Die Schönste (1957)
- Tilman Riemenschneider (1958) - Fürstbischoff Konrad von Thüringen
- Im Sonderauftrag (1959) - Hafenkommandant
- Ware für Katalonien (1959) - Geschäftsführer
- Thirty Cases of Major Zeman (1961) - 1. Herr in der S-Bahn
- Nebel (1963) - Prosecutor
- Frozen Flashes (1967) - Speer
- Ways across the Country (1968, TV Mini-Series) - Erster Offizier in Krakau
- Das siebente Jahr (1969) - Oberarzt
- Verdacht auf einen Toten (1969) - Hendrik Jahn
- Liberation I: The Fire Bulge (1970) - Generalfeldmarschall Wilhelm Keitel
- Liberation II: Breakthrough (1970) - Generalfeldmarschall Wilhelm Keitel
- Liberation III: Direction of the Main Blow (1971) - Generalfeldmarschall Wilhelm Keitel
- Liberation IV: The Battle of Berlin (1971) - Generalfeldmarschall Wilhelm Keitel
- Trotz alledem! (1972)
- Leichensache Zernik (1972) - (uncredited)
- Chyornye sukhari (1972)
- Nakovalnya ili chuk (1972) - Reichsminister Konstantin von Neurath
- Polizeiruf 110 (1972–1990, TV Series) - Alfred Ditsch / Dr. Bokelch / Arzt
- Goroda i gody (1974) - Gubernator
- Istoki (1974) - Posol
- Den, ktory neumrie (1974) - generál Höffle
- Soldiers of Freedom (1977, TV Mini-Series) - Generalfeldmarschall Wilhelm Keitel (1977)
- Fleur Lafontaine (1978) - Oberstabsarzt von Wirsing
- Für Mord kein Beweis (1979) - Dr. Helmissen
- Bürgschaft für ein Jahr (1981)
- Little Alexander (1981) - Loberg
- Dein unbekannter Bruder (1982) - Kommissar Bolten
- Hälfte des Lebens (1985)
- Battle of Moscow (1985) - Generalfeldmarschall Wilhelm Keitel
- Die Alleinseglerin (1987) - Zweiter Angestellter des Instituts
- Ich liebe dich - April! April! (1988) - Prof. Stein
- Grüne Hochzeit (1989) - Alter Mann
- Stalingrad (1989) - Generalfeldmarschall Wilhelm Keitel
- Angely smerti (1993) - Generalfeldmarschall Wilhelm Keitel (final film role)
