= Hans Stetter =

German actor (1927–2019)

Hans Stetter (16 August 1927 in Cologne, Germany – 29 January 2019) was a German television actor.

== Filmography ==
Year	Title	Role	Notes
1954	Gefährliche Fracht	Knut	
1955	Hotelboy Ed Martin	Collius	
1956	Damals in Paris	Denis	
1957	Die Schönste		
1958	Tilman Riemenschneider	Fassbänder	
1976–1977	Derrick	Herr Gubeck	2 episodes
1989	Seven Minutes	Woywode	
