= Nico Turoff =

Ukrainian actor

- Born: 6 December 1899; Kremenchuk, Russian Empire
- Died: 22 June 1978 (aged 78); East Berlin, East Germany
- Occupation: Actor
- Years active: 1926–1979

Nico Turoff (Ukrainian: Ніко Турофф; 6 December 1899 – 22 June 1978) was a Ukrainian boxer and actor. He appeared in more than one hundred films from 1926 to 1979.

== Selected filmography ==
Year	Title	Role	Notes
1927	Mata Hari		
1928	Modern Pirates		
1928	Under the Lantern		
1928	Yacht of the Seven Sins		
1928	The Prince of Rogues		
1928	The Devious Path		
1928	The Love Commandment		
1929	Don Manuel, the Bandit		
1929	Poison Gas		
1930	Cyanide		
1930	People in the Fire		
1930	For Once I'd Like to Have No Troubles		
1932	Trenck		
1933	Today Is the Day		
1936	The Impossible Woman		
1942	The Red Terror		
1942	Attack on Baku		
1944	Life Calls		
1950	The Merry Wives of Windsor		
1952	Story of a Young Couple		
1956	Thomas Muentzer		
1957	Don't Forget My Little Traudel		
1957	Bärenburger Schnurre		
1958	Emilia Galotti		
1958	My Wife Makes Music		
1959	Intrigue and Love	Hofherr	
1960	New Year's Eve Punch		
1961	The Dress		
1964	Das Lied vom Trompeter		
1967	The Heathens of Kummerow		
1968	Hauptmann Florian von der Mühle		
1969	Jungfer, Sie gefällt mir		
1974	Elective Affinities		
