= The Condemned Village =

1952 film

- Directed by: Martin Hellberg
- Written by: Jeanne Stern; Kurt Stern
- Produced by: Adolf Fischer
- Starring: Helga Göring
- Cinematography: Karl Plintzner, Joachim Hasler
- Edited by: Johanna Rosinski
- Music by: Ernst Roters
- Production company: DEFA
- Distributed by: Progress Film
- Release date: 15 April 1952
- Running time: 107 minutes
- Country: East Germany
- Language: German

The Condemned Village (German: Das verurteilte Dorf) is a 1952 East German propaganda film directed by Martin Hellberg.The film is about a man who returns from a Soviet prisoner-of-war camp to his home village in occupied West Germany and leads a resistance to the American military's plans to demolish the village to build an airfield. The film was commissioned to build East German opposition to the United States and support for the Soviet Union during the early Cold War.

== Plot ==
Farmer Heinz Weimann returns to his small Bavarian village of Bärenweiler after several years in Soviet captivity. He tells his neighbors, who have been subject to anti-Soviet propaganda disseminated by the Nazi Party and the American occupation forces, that the Soviets have treated him well. His old sweetheart Käthe has married another man, Fritz Vollmer, but he is not concerned with that. His joy on returning home is interrupted when the mayor announces that the U.S. Army intends to destroy the village and to build an airfield on its lands, in preparation for a confrontation with the Soviet Union.

The people turn to the government and to the local bishop, but receive no assistance. Led by Heinz, they turn to peaceful protests. All residents refuse to leave their homes, except Vollmer. Heinz is arrested and imprisoned. Trade unions from throughout the Federal Republic of Germany mobilize to aid the villagers. When the United States Military Police arrives to evict the inhabitants, thousands of workers arrive in Bärenweiler, and the Americans are forced to leave and abandon their plans to build the airfield.

== Cast ==
- Helga Göring as Käthe Vollmer
- Günther Simon as Heinz Weimann
- Wolf Kaiser as American colonel
- Hans Finohr as American general
- Eduard von Winterstein as priest
- Albert Garbe as mayor
- Marga Legal as Mrs. Rühling
- Albert Doerner as Fritz Vollmer
- Charlotte Crusius as Mrs. Weimann
- Otto Eduard Stübler as Meisel
- Friedrich Gnaß as Scheffler
- Ulrich von der Trenck as teacher
- Aribert Grimmer as Riebnitz
- Helmuth Hinzelmann as minister
- Paul Paulsen as Bishop
- Heinz Dhein as Klaus Meitner
- Hermann Stövesand as Anton Reinhard
- William Gade as postman
- Werner Pledath as director
- Josef Peter Dornseif as second director
- Albert Venohr as American captain
- Heinz Rosenthal as government councilor

== Production ==
In 1951, state control over the DEFA film studio was tightened, as manifested in the creation of the DEFA commission in the Socialist Unity Party of Germany's Politburo. On the backrougnd of the nascent Cold War, an emphasis was put on the creation of anti-Western films; all six pictures released by DEFA in 1952 were dedicated to this theme.

Writers Jeanne and Kurt Stern wrote the draft of the script in early 1951, after reading a newspaper report about a protest against American military presence that took place in the West German village of Hammelburg. The draft was submitted to DEFA on 14 March 1951. The National Film Board dubbed it "a remarkable agitational work in our campaign against re-militarization, for the unity of Germany and for peace." The final version was completed on 16 May; the writers took care not to highlight the importance of communism but rather the call for peace. A positive figure of a cleric, the village priest, was included in the plot; DEFA director-general Sepp Schwab had decided that it would be unwise to portray the church in a wholly negative light. A happy ending was added as well. In the original draft, the village was evicted.

The SED considered the film as one of the most important cinematic projects produced during 1951. The party's DEFA Commission praised the script as "one of the best written this year." State Secretary of Press and Agitation Hermann Axen had personally made many adjustments to the plot, and demanded that the Americans be presented as aggressors.

Two directors who were approached by DEFA - Erwin Wilhelm Fiedler and Falk Harnack - declined to work on the film. Eventually, the manager of the Dresden Theater, Martin Hellberg, who had no experience in the field of cinema, was selected to direct The Condemned Village. Principal Photography began on 28 August 1951 and ended in early December.

== Reception ==
The Condemned Village had its premiere in East Berlin's Babylon Cinema on 15 February 1952. The SED instructed all its regional branches to ensure a strong attendance for the screenings. It was viewed by 3.7 million people. The film won a special Peace Prize in the 1952 Karlovy Vary International Film Festival. Director Martin Hellberg, writers Jeanne and Kurt Stern, cinematographer Karl Plintzner and actors Eduard von Winterstein and Albert Garbe all received the National Prize, 1st degree, on 6 October 1952. Hellberg and the writers were awarded the World Peace Council's Gold Medal in 1953, as well.

Authors Antonin and Miera Liehm regarded the film as "one of the pinnacles of the propaganda art of its time" that managed to "circumvent the complete artificiality" of the Soviet pictures based on similar themes. Melvyn P. Leffler and Odd Arne Westad cited it as one of the Cold War films that presented the American troops in West Germany as oppressors.

David Caute wrote that the film was "a classic of manipulative socialist realism", and while using the motifs of classical German "homeland" pictures - depicting the pastoral countryside, and demonstrating the threat levied against it by the Americans - they were used only as a pretext to resist any Western military presence in the Federal Republic. This manipulation of the genre was noted also by Johannes von Moltke, who claimed that the film presented the "politicization of the homeland film." Caute also pointed out that the characterization of the villains was in line with the East German political line: the Americans' helpers were the local bishop and an aristocrat who fled the GDR after his lands were nationalized and handed over to his former serfs.

During 1952, the rejection of the Stalin Note by the Western Powers prompted the East German government to block and fortify the country's western borders - and to destroy several adjacent villages in the process. The film now inspired resistance to the evictions; in one settlement about to be leveled down, a man was sentenced to six years in prison after exhorting his neighbors to "act as the protesters in The Condemned Village had." Due to those events, the picture was removed from circulation in May 1953.
