= The Last Year =

1951 film

- Directed by: E.W. Fiedler; Hans Heinrich
- Written by: Ludwig Turek (novel); Richard Nicolas; Marieluise Steinhauer
- Starring: Inge Keller; Hans Klering; Hermann Stövesand
- Cinematography: Karl Plintzner
- Edited by: Anneliese Schlüter
- Music by: Horst Hans Sieber
- Production company: DEFA
- Distributed by: VEB Progress Film
- Release date: 12 April 1951
- Running time: 90 minutes
- Country: East Germany
- Language: German

The Last Year (German: Die letzte Heuer) is a 1951 East German drama film directed by E.W. Fiedler and Hans Heinrich and starring Inge Keller, Hans Klering and Hermann Stövesand. It was made by the state-controlled DEFA in communist East Germany. Filming took place at the Johannisthal Studios in Berlin. The film's sets were designed by Wilhelm Depenau and Artur Günther.

== Cast ==
- Inge Keller as Charly
- Hans Klering as Heini Holler
- Hermann Stövesand as Ferdinand
- Peter Marx as Schorsch
- Gustav Püttjer as Gustav
- Ralf Siebert as Moses
- Gerd Frickhöffer as Blague
- Otto Stübler as Konsul
- Reinhard Kolldehoff as Kommissar
- Lutz Götz as Moulin
- Peter Lehmbrock as 1. Heizer
- Hans Rose as 2. Heizer
- Werner Pledath as Kapitän
- Helmut Bautzmann as Französischer Seemann
- Johannes Bergfeldt as Holländischer Seemann
- Maria Besendahl as Frau Primm
- Albrecht Bethge as Höherer SS-Offizier
- Louis Brody
- Friedrich Wilhelm Dann as Englischer Dolmetscher
- Georg Dücker as Deutscher Dolmetscher
- Hans Fiebrandt as Gestapobeamter Möller
- Ursula Friese as Hafenmädchen
- Gerhard Gustke as Französischer Polizist
- Hans Jaeckel as SS-Protokollführer
- Wolf Kaiser as Langer SS-Mann
- Johannes Knittel as Sekretär der ISH
- Hans-Erich Korbschmitt as Gestapobeamter Schröder
- Alwin Lippisch as Mexiaknischer Kapitän
- Frank Michelis as Französischer Lagerarbeiter
- Erwin Mosblech as Französischer Polizist
- Gerda Müller as Hafenmädchen
- Erich Nadler as Irischer Seemann
- Willi Narloch as Spanischer Dolmetscher
- Peter Peterz as Kanzleisekretär
- Conrad Pfenning as SS-Arzt
- Günther Polensen as Französischer Polizeioffizier
- Hannes Ponsel as Gestapobeamter Franke
- Herbert Richter as Bootsmann
- Martin Rickelt as 1. deutscher Seemann
- Michael Symo as 1. Offizier der »Tampico«
- Friedrich Teitge as Ansager
- Nico Turoff as Französischer Seemann
- Christine von Trümbach as Frau Moulin

== Bibliography ==
- Dieter Reimer. DEFA-Stars. Militzke Verlag, 2004.
