= Eight Girls in a Boat =

Eight Girls in a Boat may refer to:

- Eight Girls in a Boat (1932 film), a 1932 German film directed by Erich Waschneck
- Eight Girls in a Boat (1934 film), a 1934 American film directed by Richard Wallace
