= Love's Awakening =

Love's Awakening may refer to:

- Love's Awakening (1953 film), a West German drama film
- Love's Awakening (1936 film), a German drama film
