= The Opportunists (1960 film) =

- Directed by: Louis Daquin
- Written by: Louis Daquin; Klaus Wischnewski; Honoré de Balzac (novel)
- Produced by: Pierre Cabaud
- Starring: Madeleine Robinson; Jean-Claude Pascal; Clara Gansard
- Cinematography: Eugen Klagemann
- Edited by: Claude Nicole
- Music by: Hanns Eisler
- Production companies: Société Nouvelle Pathé Cinéma; DEFA
- Distributed by: Pathé Consortium Cinéma
- Release date: 8 April 1960
- Running time: 112 minutes
- Countries: France; East Germany
- Language: French

The Opportunists (French: Les arrivistes, German: Trübe Wasser) is a 1960 French-East German drama film directed by Louis Daquin and starring Madeleine Robinson, Jean-Claude Pascal and Clara Gansard. It was a co-production between Pathé and DEFA. The source material is Honoré de Balzac's novel La Rabouilleuse.

== Cast ==
- Madeleine Robinson as Flore Brazier
- Jean-Claude Pascal as Philippe Brideau
- Clara Gansard as Mme. Mariette Bridou
- Erika Pelikowsky as Agathe Rouget / Brideau
- Gerhard Bienert as Jean-Jacques Rouget
- Harry Riebauer as Max Gillet
- Barbara Brecht-Schall as Vedie
- Werner Dissel as Fario
- Adolf Peter Hoffmann as Giroudeau
- Hans Ulrich Laufer as Mignonnet
- Ivan Malré as St. Auban
- Irma Münch
- Ekkehard Schall as Joseph Bridau
- Kati Székely as Conchita
- Wolf von Beneckendorff as Botschaffer
- Bella Waldritter as M.me Descoings

== Bibliography ==
- Goble, Alan. The Complete Index to Literary Sources in Film. Walter de Gruyter, 1999.
