= Kurt Stern =

German screenwriter (1907–1989)

- Born: 1907; Berlin, Germany
- Died: 1989 (aged 81–82)
- Occupation: Screenwriter
- Employer: DEFA film studio

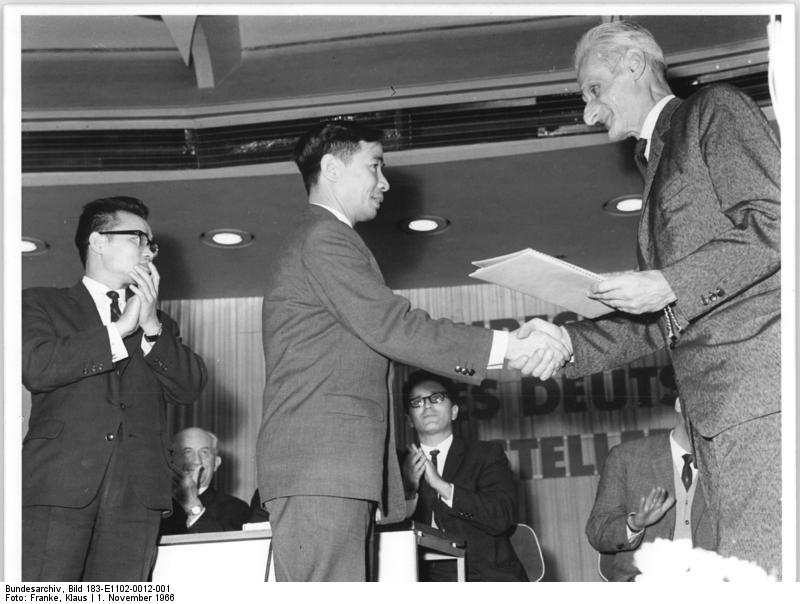
Kurt Stern (right) at an East German show of solidarity with North Vietnam in 1966.

Kurt Stern (1907 in Berlin – 1989) was a screenwriter who worked for the DEFA film studio in East Germany. He worked in partnership with his wife Jeanne (née Machin). In 1953, together with director Martin Hellberg, the Sterns were awarded the Gold Medal of the World Peace Council for the film Das verurteilte Dorf ("The condemned village").
