= Walter Jupé =

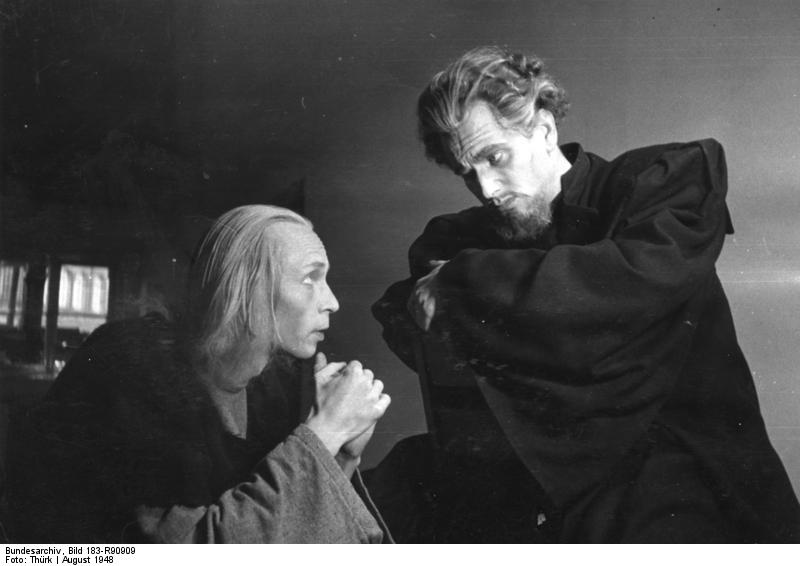
Walter Jupé (left) and Gerhard Becker in a staging of Goethe's Faust, 1948

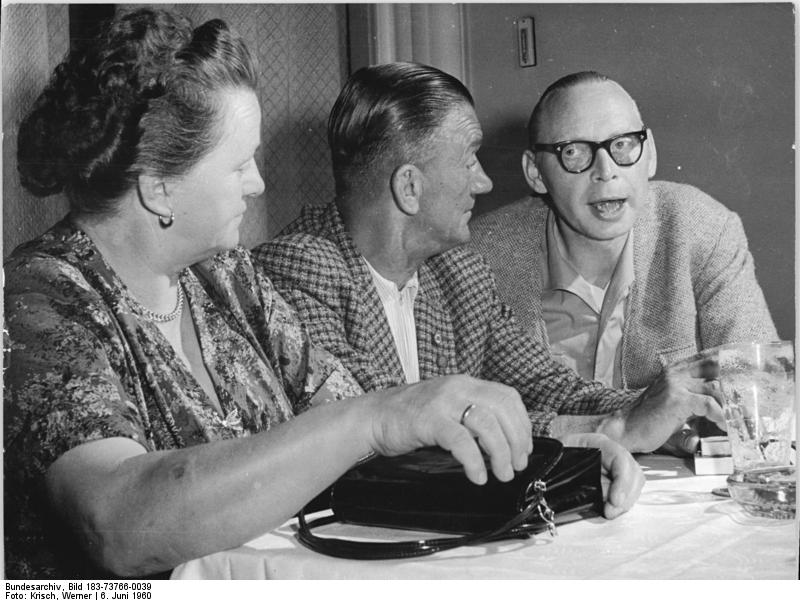
Actor Walter Jupé (right) in dialogue with guests of the II. FDGB worker festival (1960)

Walter Jupé (6 April 1916 – 16 November 1985) was a German actor, screenwriter and dramaturge.

== Life ==
After his acting training with Helene Lackner, Jupé made his debut in 1943 on a stage in Oldenburg. He was primarily active in Weimar, before moving to Maxim-Gorki-Theater in East-Berlin, where he acted until 1982. In addition to his activity on the stage, Jupé also started a film and television career at the DEFA and Television of the GDR (DFF) in the middle of the 1950s, where he primarily played villains in historical films such as The Heyde-Sawade Affair (1963).

In collaboration with writer Friedrich Karl Kaul, he wrote more than 40 episodes of the thriller-like Fernsehpitavale (television pitavals), where past criminal cases were reviewed; some episodes of which were later realised as motion pictures, e.g. Lebende Ware (1966) or Der Mord, der nie verjährt (1967).

== Selected filmography ==
- Geheimakten Solvay (1952)
- Gefährliche Fracht (1954)
- Ernst Thälmann – Leader of his Class (1955)
- Thomas Muentzer (1956)
- Bärenburger Schnurre (1957)
- Senta auf Abwegen (1959)
- Goods for Catalonia (1959)
- Guten Tag, lieber Tag (1960)
- Das hölzerne Kälbchen (1961)
- A Lively Christmas Eve (1962)
- Monolog für einen Taxifahrer (1962/1990, telefilm)
- The Heyde-Sawade Affair (1963, telefilm)
- The Rabbit Is Me (1965)
- Dr. Schlüter (1965, television series)
- Solange Leben in mir ist (1965)
- Trace of Stones (1966)
- Lebende Ware (1966)
- Heroin (1968)
- Ich – Axel Cäsar Springer (1968–1970, television series)
- Hans Beimler Kamerad (1969, telefilm)
- Trotz alledem! (1972)
- Die Bilder des Zeugen Schattmann (1972, television series)
- Das Geheimnis der Anden (1972, television series)
- Jenny (1975, telefilm)
- Des Doktors Dilemma (1976, telefilm)
- Unser Mann ist König (1980, television series)
- Melanie van der Straaten (1982, telefilm)
- Die Gerechten von Kummerow (1982)
- Drei Schwestern (1983, telefilm)
- Wie die Alten sungen… (1987)
