= His Late Excellency (1935 film) =

1935 film

- Directed by: Hans H. Zerlett
- Written by: Rudolf Presber (play); Hans H. Zerlett
- Produced by: Franz Vogel
- Starring: Arthur Schroder; Rose Vollborn; Hansjoachim Büttner
- Cinematography: Georg Krause
- Edited by: Erich Palme
- Music by: Leo Leux
- Production company: Euphono-Film
- Release date: 26 November 1935
- Country: Germany
- Language: German

His Late Excellency (German: Die selige Exzellenz) is a 1935 German historical comedy film directed by Hans H. Zerlett and starring Arthur Schroder, Rose Vollborn, and Hansjoachim Büttner. Following the death of the ruler of a German principality in the nineteenth century, intrigue breaks out in the struggle to succeed him.

The film's sets were designed by the art directors Kurt Dürnhöfer and Otto Moldenhauer.

== Cast ==
- Arthur Schröder as Der Fürst
- Rose Vollborn as Die Fürstin
- Hansjoachim Büttner as Rittmeister v. Pettersdorf, Adjutant des Fürsten
- Hilde Hildebrand as Baronin v. Windegg
- Wolfgang Liebeneiner as Dr. Konrad Weber
- Eugen Rex as Hofrat Buxbaum
- Lien Deyers as Else, dessen Tochter
- Walter Steinbeck as v. Gillzing, Oberhofmarschall
- Olga Limburg as Therese, seine Frau
- Eduard von Winterstein as Graf Seefeld, Oberhofjägermeister
- Else Lüders as Seine Frau
- Wilhelm Bendow as Klapper, fürstlicher Kammerdiener
- Bruno Ziener as Bürovorsteher Lampe
- Hanni Weisse as Toni / Brinkmann / Ballettmeisterin
- Erwin Biegel as Erster Diener im Ministerium
- Curt Cappi as Zweiter Diener im Ministerium
- Alice Hechy as Varietésängerin
- Valy Arnheim as Petersen, Diener bei Windegg
- Lucie Bernardo
- Bruno Eichgrün
- Lucie Euler
- Lilo Hartmann
- Hilde Kasper
- Kurt Keller-Nebri
- Edith Meinel
- Dolly Raphael
- Josef Reithofer
- Willi Sande-Meyer
- Lotte Steinhoff
- Grethe Weiser

== Bibliography ==
- Waldman, Harry (2000). Missing Reels: Lost Films of American and European Cinema. Jefferson, NC: McFarland. ISBN 978-0-7864-0724-8.
