= Spring Awakening (1929 film) =

1929 film directed by Richard Oswald

- Directed by: Richard Oswald
- Screenplay by: Friedrich Raff; Herbert Rosenfeld
- Based on: Spring Awakening by Frank Wedekind
- Produced by: Liddy Hegewald; Richard Oswald
- Starring: Mathilde Sussin; Toni van Eyck; Paul Henckels; Carl Balhaus
- Cinematography: Eduard Hoesch
- Music by: Walter Ulfig
- Production companies: Hegewald Film; Richard Oswald-Film
- Distributed by: Hegewald Film
- Release date: 14 November 1929
- Running time: 95 minutes
- Country: Germany
- Languages: Silent; German intertitles

Spring Awakening (German: Frühlingserwachen) is a 1929 German silent drama film directed by Richard Oswald and starring Mathilde Sussin, Toni van Eyck and Paul Henckels. It is an adaptation of the play of the same title by Frank Wedekind. It was shot at the Halensee Studios in Berlin.

It is part of the cycle of Enlightenment films made during the Weimar era. The film is centered on Melchior, a rebellious teenager, his friend Moritz, and his childhood friend and love interest Wendla.

== Cast ==
- Mathilde Sussin as Frau Bergmann
- Toni van Eyck as Wendla, her daughter
- Paul Henckels as Bürovorsteher Stiefel
- Carl Balhaus as Moritz, his son
- Rolf von Goth as Melchior Gabor
- Ita Rina as Ilse
- Willy Clever as the painter Fahrendorf
- Valy Arnheim as the rector
- Fritz Rasp as the teacher Habebald
- Bernhard Goetzke as another teacher
- Sigi Hofer as Pedell

== See also ==
- Spring Awakening (1924)
