= Auf Wiedersehen (film) =

1961 film

Auf Wiedersehn
- Directed by: Harald Philipp
- Written by: Harald Philipp
- Based on: Feinde sind auch Menschen by Reinhold Pabel
- Starring: Gert Fröbe; Werner Peters; Elke Sommer
- Cinematography: Friedl Behn-Grund
- Edited by: Elisabeth Kleinert-Neumann
- Music by: Gert Wilden
- Production company: Alfa-Film
- Distributed by: Ufa Film Hansa
- Release date: December 2, 1961 (West Germany)
- Running time: 99 minutes
- Country: West Germany
- Language: German

Auf Wiedersehen is a 1961 West German film directed by Harald Philipp and starring Gert Fröbe, Joachim Fuchsberger, Günter Pfitzmann, Werner Peters and Elke Sommer. It was based on a novel by Reinhold Pabel and features Louis Armstrong in a cameo role.

It was shot at the Spandau Studios in Berlin. Location shooting took place in Gibraltar, Spain and Berlin. The film's sets were designed by the art directors Otto Erdmann and Oskar Pietsch.

== Cast ==
- Gert Fröbe as Angelo Pirrone
- Joachim Fuchsberger as Ferdinand Steinbichler
- Günter Pfitzmann as Willi Kuhlke
- Elke Sommer as Suzy Dalton
- Werner Peters as Paul Blümel
- Margot Eskens as Anna Kuhlke
- Heinz Weiss as Steve O'Hara
- Kurd Pieritz as Gus Wheeler
- Fritz Tillmann as George Dalton
- Stanislav Ledinek as Konrad Czerny
- Hans W. Hamacher as William Shake
- Peter Capell as Louis Holloway
- Heinrich Gies as Don Howley
- Hendrik Sick as Pietro
- Louis Armstrong as himself
- Kurt Pratsch-Kaufmann as Mario Malfi

== Bibliography ==
- Bock, Hans-Michael & Bergfelder, Tim. The Concise Cinegraph: Encyclopaedia of German Cinema. Berghahn Books, 2009.
