= Peter Sturm =

Austrian and East German actor (1909–1984)

- Sturm as Walter Model in the 1970 film Liberation: The Fire Bulge
- Born: Josef Michel Dischel; 24 August 1909; Vienna, Austria-Hungary
- Died: 11 May 1984 (aged 74); East Berlin, East Germany
- Occupation: Actor
- Years active: 1936–1983

Josef Michel Dischel (24 August 1909 – 10 May 1984), known by his adopted stage name Peter Sturm, was an Austrian and an East German actor.

== Biography ==
=== Early life ===
Dischel was born into a religious Jewish family in Vienna. His father was a tailor, originally from the Polish regions of the Habsburg Empire, and died in 1915. His mother was born in Hungary.

Dischel had taken up an apprenticeship as a textile merchant, but abandoned it. He then decided to become an actor, and began taking drama lessons from renowned Austrian performer Raoul Aslan. While studying, he worked as a radio mechanic. After completing his studies, he assumed the stage name Peter Sturm. He joined the Social Democratic Party of Austria when he was nineteen years old, and later turned to an active member of the Communist Party of Austria, that was declared illegal by Chancellor Engelbert Dollfuss. In 1935, he was convicted of high treason and condemned to two and a half years in prison. Sturm eventually served eighteen months, in the Stein an der Donau prison and in the Wöllersdorf detention camp. In 1936, subsequent to his release, he joined the cast of Brettl am Alsergrund, a political, left-leaning kabarett in Vienna's Alsergrund district, that was managed by Leon Askin and commonly known as Das ABC Kabarett. (Note: The cabaret was originally housed in a building located in Café City, at the corner of the Alsergrund's Porzellangasse and Berggasse. ABC stood for the initials of 'Alsergrund, Brettl, City'. In 1935, Das ABC moved to Arkaden Cafe, in Universitätstraße 3. See: Hilde Haider-Pregler, Beate Reiterer (editors). Verspielte Zeit. Österreichisches Theater der dreißiger Jahre. ISBN 978-3-85452-402-1. p. 240.) The actor was one of the cabaret's three declared communists, alongside Jura Soyfer and Robert Klein-Lörk.

=== Holocaust ===
In May 1938, after the Anschluss, Sturm was arrested and sent to the Dachau concentration camp. In August, he was transferred to the Buchenwald concentration camp, where he was held in the same barrack with actor Fritz Grünbaum. He was registered as an Austrian political prisoner. In April 1939, Sturm was released from Buchenwald and allowed to leave Germany. He emigrated to Italy, spending three months in Milan. Then, he illegally crossed the border into France, settling in Marseille. After the Second World War broke out in September, he was interned in the Camp des Milles, where he acted in the camp's makeshift theater. On 27 June 1941, shortly after France surrendered to Germany, the camp's residents were to be evacuated on a train to Bayonne. Sturm managed to escape. He lived in Marseille until August 1942, when he was deported to the Drancy internment camp, from which he was sent to the Auschwitz concentration camp. He was held in the Blechhammer sub-camp, where he was forced to serve as a barber. Occasionally, when the guards authorized it, he participated in theater evenings. In January 1945, the prisoners were evacuated to Buchenwald in a death march. Sturm survived it and wrote an account on the march shortly after arriving in Buchenwald. He joined the camp's communist underground organization. While in Buchenwald, he was a member of the building detachment headed by Robert Siewert. During the Holocaust, his mother was murdered in Auschwitz. Buchenwald was liberated on 11 April 1945.

=== Later years ===
Sturm returned to Vienna, where he resumed his acting career and worked as a radio presenter. He appeared regularly on the stage of the Theater in der Josefstadt, and later joined the cast of the New Theater in the Scala in the city's Wieden district, then in the Soviet-administrated zone. The theater, opened in 1948, was founded by communist exiles who returned to Austria after the end of the war. Sturm made his debut on screen in the 1956 film adaptation of the operetta Gasparone. During the same year - after the Soviet withdrawal from Austria left it without financial and political support - the Scala had to be closed. (Note: Beside taking up a communist and a pro-Soviet line, the Scala also openly defied the ban imposed on Bertolt Brecht's plays in Vienna. Journalists Friedrich Torberg and Hans Weigel, both fierce opponents of the playwright, were calling for the theater's closure since the early 1950s. See: Carmen R Köper. Ein unheiliges Experiment: Das neue Theater in der Scala (1948-1956) Löcker (1995). ISBN 978-3-85409-252-0.) With several other fellow actors from the theater, Sturm left Vienna and emigrated to the German Democratic Republic, settling in East Berlin. There, director Wolfgang Langhoff took him into the Deutsches Theater, in which he remained a member of the regular cast. In 1960, he performed the role of August Rose, a Buchenwald prisoner who betrays his friends, in a television production based on Bruno Apitz's novel Naked Among Wolves. On 30 March 1961 Sturm was awarded the Art Prize of the German Democratic Republic. In 1963, when he was requested to play August Rose once more for Frank Beyer's film remake of the series, Apitz and Beyer had to convince him to agree. Sturm was badly depressed by the work on Naked Among Wolves, and became very ill after the filming ended. He was involved in the commemoration of Buchenwald's victims until his departure.

Sturm had a long career as an actor with DEFA and DFF in East Germany, appearing in more than fifty cinema and television productions.

== Filmography ==
Film
Year	Title	Role	Notes
1956	Gasparone	Minor role	
1959	Goods for Catalonia	Mr. Dupont	
1959	An Old Love	Heinrich Rantsch	
1960	One of Us	Minor role	
1960	Master Puntila and His Servant Matti	Minor role	
1960	No Trouble with Cleopatra	Mathias Kahlow	
1960	The Dog In The Moors	Karl Schultz	
1960	The Hedgehog: The Woman of his Dreams	Department chief Krause	Short
1961	Stone Age Ballad	Berger	
1961	Professor Mamlock	Doctor Hirsch	
1961	Death Has a Face	Old man in the morgue	
1961	The Hedgehog: Fairly Good Improvement	Jochen Emsig	Short
1962	On the Sunny Side	Intendant Pabst	
1962	Julian Boell´s Discovery	Wilhelm Zoch	
1962	Einer von uns		
1962	Der Tod hat ein Gesicht	Alter Mann im Leichenschauhaus	
1963	Naked Among Wolves	August Rose	
1963	Reserved for the Death	Train conductor	
1965	As Long as There is Life in Me	Ober	
1965	Karla	Hartmann	
1966	Living Ware	Mahlmann	
1968	Heroin	Commisar Doboka	
1970	Liberation I: The Fire Bulge	Colonel-General Walter Model	
1971	Liberation III: The Direction of the Main Blow	Field Marshal Walter Model	
1971	KLK Calling PTZ - The Red Orchestra	Krapotschkin	
1974	Jacob the Liar	Schmidt	
1979	Just Put Flowers on the Roof	Hotel receptionist	
1980	Max and Seven-and-a-Half Boys	Max	
1980	Johann Sebastian Bach's Forgotten Journey to Glory	Neighbour	
1981	The Daughters' Hour	Brigadier Fuchs	
1981	The Colony	Rudi Baden	

Television
Year	Title	Role	Notes
1960	Naked Among Wolves	August Rose	
1962	David and Goliath	Sophus Möller	
1962	Television Pitaval	Uncredited role	Episode 2: Shot While Fleeing
1963	Television Pitaval	Councillor Heigl	Episode 3: The Heyde-Sawade Affair
1963	The Trail Leads to the 7th Heaven	Detective Superintendent Müller	All five episodes
1963	Vanina Vanini	Asdrubale Vanini	
1965	The Man from Heinitz	Wünsche	
1965-1966	Doctor Schlüter	Professor Tolset	
1965	Moments of Joy	Mühlmann	
1966	The Persians	Uncredited role	
1966	The Investigation: An Oratorio in Eleven Acts	Arthur Breitwieser	
1967	Little Man, What Now?	Salesman in the bed store	
1967	Ruhr in Flames	Hövelmann	
1969	Krupp and Krause	Piachowsky	
1969	The Lady from Genua	Uncredited role	
1970	Every Man Dies Alone	Uncredited role	
1972	The Pictures of Witness Schattmann	Elias Lernamnn	
1974	Late Season	Psychiatrist	
1975	Police Call 110	Old man	Episode no. 32: A Case without Witnesses
1977	The Love and the Queen	Sir Joshua Farnaby	
1979	The Prosecutor Has the Floor	Doctor Feigel	Episode no. 58: To Celebrate this Day
1980	Regina or the Trap	Ludwig Blume	
1980	Outside in Heidedorf	Harmonica player	
1980	An Advertisement in the Newspaper	Alfred Just	
1981	Jockey Monika	Mr. Zaubel	Episode no. 6: Inventors Love Practicality
1981	The Uninvited Guest	Uncredited role	Part 2
1982	Hotel Polan and its Guests	Doctor Levi / Doctor Silberstein	
1983	Martin Luther	Hans Luther	
1983	Evening in Kelch	Wirt	
1983	Bruno H. Bürgel - Berlin's Heaven	August Jost	
1983	The Stage is Set	Uncredited role	(final appearance)

Voice actor
Year	Title	Role	Notes
1958	Naked Among Wolves	Pippig	Radio drama
1960	First Spaceship on Venus	Professor Sołtyk	Dubbing character in the German version
1968	Hauptmann Florian von der Mühle	Police chief	Dubbing Rolf Hoppe; voice only
