= For Love and Others =

- Directed by: Jürgen Roland (Episode 1); Hans Heinrich (Episode 2); Reinhard Elsner (Episode 3)
- Written by: Wolfgang Menge (Episode 1); Reinhard Elsner (Episode 2); Ernst Hasselbach (Episode 2); Gustav Lehmann (Episode 3)
- Produced by: Fritz Anton
- Starring: Monika Peitsch; Paul Esser; Hilde Sessak
- Cinematography: Herbert Geier; Bruno Mondi
- Edited by: Liselotte Schumacher
- Music by: Willy Mattes; Klaus Günter Neumann
- Distributed by: Cinephon-Film GmbH
- Release date: 1959
- Running time: 81 minutes
- Country: West Germany
- Language: German

For Love and Others (original German title: Unser Wunderland bei Nacht) is a 1959 West German anthology film, directed by Jürgen Roland, Hans Heinrich and Reinhard Elsner. The film stars Monika Peitsch, Angelika Meissner and Paul Esser.

Better known than the film is the music. The main theme, composed by Klaus Günter Neumann, is Wonderland by Night, a Billboard number one hit in Bert Kaempfert's version from 1961.

== Plot ==
Three episodes from the shadow region of the 1950s West German Wirtschaftswunder: brutality and sentimentalities at the Davidswache at Hamburg's Reeperbahn (episode 1), two young girls of good family in a Munich milieu of Halbstarke (episode 2), corrupt businessmen in bed of a Düsseldorf callgirl (episode 3).

== Cast ==
- Paul Esser as Hauptwachtmeister Siegel (Episode 1)
- Hilde Sessak as Frau Lührmann (Episode 1)
- Angelika Meissner as Helga Barufka (Episode 2)
- Monika Peitsch as Bessy Neuhaus (Episode 2)
- Friedrich Schoenfelder as Generaldirektor Schreiber (Episode 3)
- Cora Roberts as Das Fräulein Doktor (Episode 3)
- Steffi Stroux as Gräfin Reichswitz (Episode 3)
- Hildegard Grethe as Die alte Frau

== Censorship ==
When For Love and Others was first released in Italy in 1960 the Committee for the Theatrical Review of the Italian Ministry of Cultural Heritage and Activities rated it as VM16: not suitable for children under 16. The reason for the age restriction, cited in the official documents, was that the episodes featured prostitution and erotic scenes. In addition the committee imposed the removal of the following scene: 1) reel 8 – dialogue on page 5 and 6 – from Flessing's line: "...yes, I have been told already today..." to line: "Freddy, I'm on my way..."; 2) reel 10 – dialogue on page 4 and 5 – from Freddy's line: "I love frills" to Backside's line: "Freddy, kill the light...". The official document number is: 31818, it was signed on 29 April 1960 by Minister Domenico Magrì.
