= Intrigue and Love (film) =

1959 film

- Directed by: Martin Hellberg
- Written by: Friedrich Schiller (play); Martin Hellberg
- Produced by: Paul Ramacher
- Starring: Wolf Kaiser; Otto Mellies; Marion Van de Kamp
- Cinematography: Karl Plintzner
- Edited by: Ursula Rudzki
- Music by: Wilhelm Neef
- Production company: DEFA
- Release date: 1959
- Running time: 111 minutes
- Country: East Germany
- Language: German

Intrigue and Love (German: Kabale und Liebe) is a 1959 East German historical drama film directed by Martin Hellberg and starring Wolf Kaiser, Otto Mellies and Marion Van de Kamp. The film was made by the East German state-owned DEFA studio. It is an adaptation of Friedrich Schiller's 1784 play Intrigue and Love.

The film's sets were designed by the art director Harald Horn.

== Plot ==
Ferdinand is an army major and son of President von Walter, while Luise Miller is the daughter of a middle-class musician. They fall in love with each other, but both their fathers urge them to end the affair.

== Cast ==
- Wolf Kaiser as Präsident von Walter
- Otto Mellies as Ferdinand, sein Sohn
- Marion Van de Kamp as Lady Milford
- Willi Schwabe as Hofmarschall von Kalb
- Martin Hellberg as Miller, Stadtmusikant
- Marianne Wünscher as seine Frau
- Karola Ebeling as Luise, seine Tochter
- Uwe-Jens Pape as Wurm, Haussekretär des Präsidenten
- Hans Finohr as Kammerdiener
- Christine Schwarze as Sophie, Kammerjungfer
- Waltraud Backmann as Hofdame
- Fredy Barten as 1. Hofherr
- Hildegard Distelmann as Witwe
- Wilhelm Otto Eckhardt as Minister und Hofherr
- Hans Feldner
- Horst Giese as Rebell
- Max Klingberg as Gefängniswärter
- Sepp Klose as 1. Reiterknecht
- Otto Krone as Geheimer
- Alexander Papendiek as Rebell
- Linde Sommer
- Doris Thalmer
- Nico Turoff as Hofherr
- Ilse Voigt as Bürgerin
- Lisa Wehn as Alte Frau

== Bibliography ==
- Goble, Alan. The Complete Index to Literary Sources in Film. Walter de Gruyter, 1999.
