= Rynek, Warmian-Masurian Voivodeship =

Rynek
- Village
- Location within Poland
- Coordinates: 53°22′N 19°47′E
- Country: Poland
- Voivodeship: Warmian-Masurian
- County: Nowe Miasto
- Gmina: Grodziczno

Rynek [ˈrɨnɛk] is a village in the administrative district of Gmina Grodziczno, within Nowe Miasto County, Warmian-Masurian Voivodeship, in northern Poland.

== Notable residents ==
- Hans Finohr (1891 - 1966), actor
