= Hans Heinrich (director) =

German film editor and director

- Born: 2 November 1911; Berlin, German Empire
- Died: November 5, 2003 (aged 92); Berlin, Germany
- Occupations: Director, Editor, Screenwriter
- Years active: 1938-1983 (film)

Hans Heinrich (1911–2003) was a German film editor, screenwriter and film director.

== Selected filmography ==
=== Director ===
- The Last Year (1951)
- Knall and Fall as Detectives (1952)
- Love's Awakening (1953)
- Old Barge, Young Love (1957)
- My Wife Makes Music (1958)
- For Love and Others (1959)
- The Cry of the Wild Geese (1961)

=== Editor ===
- The Three Codonas (1940)
- Philharmonic (1944)
- The Murderers Are Among Us (1946)

== Bibliography ==
- Feinstein, Joshua. The Triumph of the Ordinary: Depictions of Daily Life in the East German Cinema, 1949-1989. University of North Carolina Press, 2002.
