= The Mayor of Zalamea (1956 film) =

1956 film

Der Richter von Zalamea
- Directed by: Martin Hellberg
- Written by: Pedro Calderón de la Barca (play), Martin Hellberg
- Cinematography: Götz Neumann
- Edited by: Lieselotte Johl
- Music by: Wilhelm Neef
- Release date: 20 April 1956
- Running time: 106
- Country: East Germany
- Language: German

Der Richter von Zalamea is an East German film. It was released in 1956.

== Cast ==
- Hansjoachim Büttner as Pedro Crespo
- Gudrun Schmidt as Isabell
- Günther Ballier as König Philipp II.
- Ursula Braun as Chispa
- Albert Garbe as Don Lope
- Annegret Golding as Ines
- Rolf Ludwig as Rebolledo
- Alexander Papendiek as Juan
- Rüdiger Renn as Don Alvaro
- Raimund Schelcher as Sergeant
