= Oskar Pietsch =

German art director

- Born: 10 January 1918; Berlin, Germany
- Died: 28 November 2012 (aged 94); Berlin, Germany
- Occupation: Art director
- Years active: 1952-1972 (film and television)

Oskar Pietsch (1918–2012) was a German art director.

== Selected filmography ==
- Kein Hüsung (1954)
- Der Ochse von Kulm (1955)
- The Captain from Cologne (1956)
- Berlin, Schoenhauser Corner (1957)
- My Wife Makes Music (1958)
- Love's Confusion (1959)
- Auf Wiedersehen (film) (1961)
- The Invisible Dr. Mabuse (1962)

== Bibliography ==
- Kalat, David. The Strange Case of Dr. Mabuse: A Study of the Twelve Films and Five Novels. McFarland, 2005.
