= Escape from Hell (1928 film) =

1928 film directed by Georg Asagaroff

- Directed by: Georg Asagaroff
- Written by: Hermann Ahrens
- Produced by: Rudolf Meinert
- Starring: Jean Murat; Ágnes Eszterházy; Louis Ralph
- Cinematography: A.O. Weitzenberg
- Production company: Phoenix Film
- Distributed by: Deutsch-Russische Film-Allianz
- Release date: 23 April 1928
- Country: Germany
- Languages: Silent; German intertitles

Escape from Hell (German: Flucht aus der Hölle) is a 1928 German silent drama film directed by Georg Asagaroff and starring Jean Murat, Ágnes Eszterházy and Louis Ralph.

The film's art direction was by Alexander Ferenczy.

== Cast ==
- Jean Murat as Erik Ward
- Ágnes Eszterházy
- Louis Ralph
- Paul Heidemann
- Raimondo Van Riel
- Fritz Alberti
- Harry Frank
- Leo Peukert
- Else Reval
- Leopold von Ledebur
- Nikolaus von Lovrie
- Aruth Wartan

== Bibliography ==
- Alfred Krautz. International directory of cinematographers, set- and costume designers in film, Volume 4. Saur, 1984.
