= The Age of Seventeen =

1929 film directed by Georg Asagaroff

- Directed by: Georg Asagaroff
- Written by: Max Dreyer (play); Fritz Falkenstein
- Starring: Grete Mosheim; Hans Adalbert Schlettow; Martin Herzberg
- Cinematography: Friedrich Weinmann
- Music by: Giuseppe Becce
- Production company: Terra Film
- Distributed by: Terra Film
- Release date: 8 January 1929
- Country: Germany
- Languages: Silent; German intertitles

The Age of Seventeen (German: Die Siebzehnjährigen) is a 1929 German silent film directed by Georg Asagaroff and starring Grete Mosheim, Hans Adalbert Schlettow and Martin Herzberg. It was shot at the Terra Studios in Berlin. The film's art direction was by Hans Jacoby.

== Cast ==
- Grete Mosheim as Erika Sörensen
- Hans Adalbert Schlettow as Werner von Lingen
- Martin Herzberg as Gert von Lingen
- Vera Baranovskaya as Annemarie von Lingen
- Eduard von Winterstein as Erik Sörensen
- Carl Balhaus as Gerts Freund Martin
- Gerhard Ritterband as Gerts Freund Hans
- Eva Speyer as Mutter Schwarz
- Manfred Voss as Primaner Schwarz
- Heinrich Gotho

== Bibliography ==
- Kasten, Jürgen; Bruns, Brigitte (2005). Erna Morena. Belleville. ISBN 978-3-936298-52-9.
