= Gerhard Bienert =

German actor (1898–1986)

Gerhard Max Richard Bienert (8 January 1898 – 23 December 1986) was a German stage and film actor.

Gerhard Bienert was born in Berlin, Germany and died in West Berlin in 1986 at age 88. He was the brother of actor Reinhold Bernt (1902 - 1981).

== Selected filmography ==
- Duke Ferrante's End (1922)
- Man by the Wayside (1923)
- The Man with the Frog (1929)
- Mother Krause's Journey to Happiness (1929) - Untermieter
- Ludwig II, King of Bavaria (1930) - Hesselschwerdt
- The Blue Angel (1930) - Polizist / Policeman
- Her Majesty the Barmaid (1931) - Werkmeister
- The Man in Search of His Murderer (1931) - Policeman
- Feind im Blut (1931) - Mechaniker
- Inquest (1931) - Baumann, Kriminalkommissar
- M (1931) - Criminal Secretary
- Checkmate (1931) - 2. Kommissar
- Panik in Chicago (1931) - Tom
- The Battle of Bademunde (1931) - Feldwebel
- Berlin-Alexanderplatz (1931) - Klempner-Karl
- Peace of Mind (1931) - Unteroffizier Krause
- Kameradschaft (1931) - Deutscher Gendarm
- The Captain from Köpenick (1931) - Gardegrenadier
- Yorck (1931)
- The Pride of Company Three (1932) - Sergeant Schmidt
- Things Are Getting Better Already (1932) - Polizist
- Rasputin, Demon with Women (1932)
- Five from the Jazz Band (1932)
- Crime Reporter Holm (1932)
- Kuhle Wampe (1932) - Zeitungsleser in der S-Bahn
- Man Without a Name (1932)
- Unheimliche Geschichten (1932) - Kriminalkommissar
- The Heath Is Green (1932)
- The First Right of the Child (1932)
- I by Day, You by Night (1932) - Polizist
- The Testament of Dr. Mabuse (1933)
- Morgenrot (1933) - Seaman Böhm
- Ich will Dich Liebe lehren (1933)
- Jumping Into the Abyss (1933) - Walter Volkmann
- Her Highness the Saleswoman (1933) - Der Kontrolleur
- Inge and the Millions (1933) - Arbeiter
- Police Report (1934) - Ihr Mann, ein Arbeiter
- My Heart Calls You (1934)
- A Man Wants to Get to Germany (1934)
- Hard Luck Mary (1934) - Kagel
- Herr Kobin geht auf Abenteuer (1934) - Der fremde Herr
- Decoy (1934) - 1. Offizier an Bord der 'Adrian Termeer'
- The Two Seals (1934) - Friese
- Oberwachtmeister Schwenke (1935)
- Everything for a Woman (1935) - Tim, ein verkrachter Artist
- Amphitryon (1935)
- A Pair of Lovers (1935) - Schnaars, Gutsverwalter
- Hangmen, Women and Soldiers (1935) - Kossmann
- Trouble Backstairs (1935) - Bäckermeister Gustav Kluge
- Black Roses (1935) - Niklander
- Fährmann Maria (1936) - The Wealthy Landowner
- Die große und die kleine Welt (1936) - Werner - Schusters Freund
- The Beggar Student (1936) - Kinsky, Tierbudenbesitzer
- City of Anatol (1936) - Arbeiter bei Ölbohrungen
- Annemarie. Die Geschichte einer jungen Liebe (1936) - Feldwebel
- Back in the Country (1936) - Pohl, Gendarm
- Thunder, Lightning and Sunshine (1936) - Ingenieur Poppe
- The Man Who is Talked About (1937) - Dompteur Carasso
- Krach und Glück um Künnemann (1937) - Paul Lindner - Magistratsbeamter
- Gewitterflug zu Claudia (1937) - Huebner, Bordmechaniker
- The Indian Tomb (1938) - Ratani, Werkmeister
- The Marriage Swindler (1938) - Assistent Obermeier
- Musketier Meier III (1938) - Feldwebel Nagel
- The Holm Murder Case (1938) - Krim.Assistent bei Sartorius
- Das Leben kann so schön sein (1938) - Dietrich, Noras Abteilungsleiter
- Pour le Mérite (1938) - Gefängnis-Wachhabender
- Altes Herz geht auf die Reise (1938, released 1947) - Paul Schlieker
- Aufruhr in Damaskus (1939) - Feldwebel Lemcke
- Parkstrasse 13 (1939) - Kommissar Warnke
- Escape in the Dark (1939) - Lagerverwalter Müller
- Gold in New Frisco (1939) - Ferguson
- The Desert Song (1939) - Hafenbeamter
- Der letzte Appell (1939)
- Rote Mühle (1940)
- Was wird hier gespielt? (1940)
- The Girl from Barnhelm (1940)
- The Girl from Fano (1941) - Hinnerk
- Alarm (1941) - Kriminalkommissar Dr. Dittmann
- Uncle Kruger (1941) - Scottish Officer Brown
- Krach im Vorderhaus (1941) - (uncredited)
- Her Other Self (1941) - 1. Arbeiter
- I Entrust My Wife to You (1943) - Verkehrspolizist
- Shiva und die Galgenblume (1945)
- Leuchtende Schatten (1945)
- Die Schenke zur ewigen Liebe (1945)
- Peter Voss, Thief of Millions (1946) - Taxichauffeur (uncredited)
- Blue Affair (1948) - Karl Bremer
- Night of the Twelve (1949)
- Die Kreuzlschreiber (1950) - Bit Part (uncredited)
- Mein Herz darfst du nicht fragen (1952) - Wachtmeister (uncredited)
- Die Unbesiegbaren (1953) - Wachtmeister Vogt
- Ernst Thälmann (1954) - Otto Kramer
- Ein Polterabend (1955) - Rentier Buffy
- Before God and Man (1955)
- Thomas Müntzer (1956) - Count Ernst von Mansfeld
- Die Millionen der Yvette (1956) - Bleichstetter, Bankier
- Lissy (1957) - Vater Schröder
- Polonia-Express (1957) - Wilhelm Merkel
- Die Schönste (1957) - Gustav Wille
- Les Misérables (1958) - Le président du tribunal
- Emilia Galotti (1958) - Odoardo Galotti
- Ein Mädchen von 16 ½ (1958) - Oskar Genz
- Der Prozeß wird vertagt (1958) - Gefängnisdirektor
- Klotz am Bein (1958) - Vater Weber
- Reportage 57 (1959) - Vater Kramer
- Love's Confusion (1959) - 1. Taxichauffeur
- The Opportunists (1960) - Jean-Jacques Rouget
- Alwin der Letzte (1960) - Alwin Schmieder
- Die heute über 40 sind (1960) - Herr Weidtlich
- Mutter Courage und ihre Kinder (1960) - Feldwebel
- Viel Lärm um nichts (1964) - Holzapfel
- Ohne Paß in fremden Betten (1965) - Wilhelm Kabuffke
- Hochzeitsnacht im Regen (1967) - Master of Provisions
- Wir lassen uns scheiden (1968) - Opa Koch
- Effi Briest (1970, TV Movie) - Vater Briest
- Die Elixiere des Teufels (1973) - Prior Leonard
- Der nackte Mann auf dem Sportplatz (1974) - Wilhelm
- Suse, liebe Suse (1975) - Herms
- Flowers for the Man in the Moon (1975) - Opa Sielaff
- Hostess (1976) - Rentner Heinrich
- Die Leiden des jungen Werthers (1976) - Pfarrer
- Die Flucht (1977) -Schmidts Vater
- Sabine Wulff (1978) - Onkel Karl
- Fleur Lafontaine (1978) - Opa Schnedderich
- Groß und Klein (1980) - Alter / Assistent

== Bibliography ==
- Kosta, Barbara. Willing Seduction: The Blue Angel, Marlene Dietrich, and Mass Culture. Berghahn Books, 2009
