= Damals in Paris =

1956 film

- Directed by: Carl Balhaus
- Written by: Carl Balhaus; Hermann Rodigast
- Starring: Gisela Trowe
- Cinematography: Eugen Klagemann
- Release date: 2 November 1956
- Running time: 92 minutes
- Country: East Germany
- Language: German

Damals in Paris is an East German film directed by Carl Balhaus. It was released in 1956.

== Cast ==
- Gisela Trowe as Geneviève
- Richard Lauffen as Padet
- Günther Simon as Georges
- Hans Stetter as Denis
- Susanne Düllmann as Louise
- Will van Deeg as Krecher
- Hans Fiebrandt as Krügel
- Waldemar Jacobi as Boulin
- Friedrich Teitge as Mann im Hut
- Fritz Decho as Gaston
- Wolfgang Kieling as René
- Herwart Grosse as Madou
- Horst Giese as Robert
