= Spoiling the Game =

1932 film

- Directed by: Alfred Zeisler
- Written by: Fred A. Angermayer; Philipp Lothar Mayring; Fritz Rotter; Fritz Zeckendorf
- Produced by: Alfred Zeisler
- Starring: Heinz Rühmann; Toni van Eyck; Hermann Speelmans
- Cinematography: Werner Bohne; Werner Brandes
- Edited by: Wolfgang Becker; Erno Hajos
- Music by: Hans-Otto Borgmann
- Production company: UFA
- Distributed by: UFA
- Release date: 25 October 1932
- Running time: 99 minutes
- Country: Germany
- Language: German

Spoiling the Game (German: Strich durch die Rechnung) is a 1932 German comedy film directed by Alfred Zeisler and starring Heinz Rühmann, Toni van Eyck, and Hermann Speelmans. Its hero is a young cyclist who enters a race.

It was made by German's largest film company UFA and shot at the velodrome in Forst (Lausitz). The film's sets were designed by the art directors Willi Herrmann and Herbert Lippschitz. A separate French-language version Rivaux de la piste was also released.

== Cast ==
- Heinz Rühmann as Willy Streblow - Rennfahrer
- Toni van Eyck as Hanni
- Hermann Speelmans as Erwin Banz - Rennfahrer
- Margarete Kupfer as Mutter Streblow
- Jakob Tiedtke as Spengler - Fahrradhändler
- Gustl Gstettenbaur as Gustl Spengler - sein Sohn
- Ludwig Stössel
- Flockina von Platen as Gina Paradies
- Fritz Odemar as Lißmann - Prokurist
- Harry Hardt as Manuel Rodriguet - Rennfahrer
- Otto Wallburg as Gottfried Paradies
- Fritz Kampers as Fritz Wagmüller - Willys Schrittmacher
- Kurt Pulvermacher as Der kleine Paradies
- Hans Zesch-Ballot as Hans Donath - Sportjournalist
- Carl Balhaus
- Trude Tandar
- Ernst Behmer
- Adolf Fischer
- Charlie Kracker
- Emilie Kurz
- Wera Liessem
- Ernst Morgan
- Liselotte Rosen
- Hans Hermann Schaufuß
- Werner Stock
- Toni Tetzlaff
- Rolf Wenkhaus
- Georg Kroschel
- Kurt Thormann
- Ewald Wenck

== Bibliography ==
- Waldman, Harry. Nazi Films in America, 1933-1942. McFarland, 2008.
