= My Wife Makes Music =

1958 film

- Directed by: Hans Heinrich
- Written by: Marieluise Steinhauer; Hans Heinrich
- Starring: Lore Frisch; Günther Simon; Maly Delschaft
- Cinematography: Eugen Klagemann
- Edited by: Friedel Welsandt
- Music by: Gerd Natschinski
- Production company: DEFA
- Distributed by: Progress Film
- Release date: 3 April 1958
- Running time: 85 minutes
- Country: East Germany
- Language: German

My Wife Makes Music (German: Meine Frau macht Musik) is an East German musical film directed by Hans Heinrich. It was released in 1958, and sold 6,052,050 tickets. It was shot at the Babelsberg Studios in Potsdam. The film's sets were designed by the art director Oskar Pietsch.

The film was very popular at the box office, but drew criticism from East Germany's communist authorities who regarded its style as too close to western commercial cinema.

== Synopsis ==
It was a revue film in which an East Berlin housewife is discovered and turned into a singing star by an Italian, much to her husband's disapproval.

== Cast ==
- Lore Frisch as Gerda Wagner
- Günther Simon as Gustl Wagner
- Maly Delschaft as Susi Rettig
- Alice Prill as Eva Rettig
- Herbert Kiper as Fritz Rettig
- Evelyn Künneke as Daisy
- Alexander Hegarth as Fabiani
- Manon Damann as Soloist Ballett der Komischen Oper Berlin
- Walter E. Fuß as Barmixer
- Guido Goroll as Mann in Loge
- Klaus Gross
- Paul Heidemann as Direktor Nielsen
- Paul R. Henker as U-Bahn-Kontrolleur
- Werner Höllein as Soloist Ballett der Komischen Oper
- Katina Imme as Katharina
- Hans Klering as Hutkäufer
- Ruth Kommerell as Verkäuferin am Papierwarenstand
- Else Korén as Frau des Hutkäufers
- Genia Lapuhs
- Mario Lerch as Francesco
- Werner Lierck as Kunde
- Gitta Lind
- Alfred Maack as Pförtner
- Vladimir Marof as Ballettsolist der Komischen Oper Berlin
- Ingeborg Naß
- Kurt Schmidtchen as Arthur Papke
- Heinz Schubert as Spießer
- Lou Seitz as Jette
- Friedrich Teitge as Bühnenarbeiter
- Nico Turoff

== Bibliography ==
- Feinstein, Joshua. The Triumph of the Ordinary: Depictions of Daily Life in the East German Cinema, 1949–1989. University of North Carolina Press, 2002.
