= Love of Life (disambiguation) =

Love of Life is a TV series created by Roy Winsor, broadcast from 1951 to 1980.

Love of Life may also refer to:

- "Love of Life" (story), written by Jack London in 1905
- Love of Life (album) by Swans, released in 1992
- The Love of Life, album released by pop-punk band Watashi Wa in 2003
- Love of Life (film), a 1924 German film
- Arthur Rubinstein – The Love of Life, a 1969 documentary about pianist Arthur Rubinstein

== See also ==
- Love of Life Orchestra, an American band
- Love for Life, a 2011 Chinese film
