= Hans-Joachim Büttner =

German actor (1900–1973)

- Born: 2 November 1900; Coburg, German Empire
- Died: 28 July 1973 (aged 72); Potsdam, East Germany
- Other names: Hansjoachim Büttner, Joachim Büttner
- Occupation: Actor
- Years active: 1932-1971 (film)

Hans-Joachim Büttner (1900–1973) was a German stage and film actor. After the Second World War he appeared in East German films.

== Selected filmography ==
- The White Demon (1932)
- Tugboat M 17 (1933)
- Hitlerjunge Quex (1933)
- A Door Opens (1933)
- Gold (1934)
- Pillars of Society (1935)
- His Late Excellency (1935)
- My Life for Maria Isabella (1935)
- A Strange Guest (1936)
- The Golden Mask (1939)
- Commissioner Eyck (1940)
- Das kleine und das große Glück (1953)
- Stärker als die Nacht (1954)
- Die Millionen der Yvette (1956)
- The Mayor of Zalamea (1956)
- Wo Du hin gehst (1957)

== Bibliography ==
- Giesen, Rolf. Nazi Propaganda Films: A History and Filmography. McFarland, 2003.
