= The Invisible Dr. Mabuse =

1962 film

- Directed by: Harald Reinl
- Written by: Ladislas Fodor
- Produced by: Artur Brauner; Wolf Brauner
- Starring: Lex Barker; Karin Dor; Siegfried Lowitz
- Cinematography: Ernst W. Kalinke
- Edited by: Hermann Haller
- Music by: Peter Sandloff
- Production company: CCC Film
- Distributed by: Constantin Film
- Release date: 30 March 1962
- Running time: 89 minutes
- Country: West Germany
- Language: German

The Invisible Dr. Mabuse (German: Die unsichtbaren Krallen des Dr. Mabuse) is a 1962 West German mystery thriller film directed by Harald Reinl and starring Lex Barker, Karin Dor and Siegfried Lowitz. Wolfgang Preiss reprised his role as Dr. Mabuse, based on the character created by Norbert Jacques, who he played in a series of films during the period. It was shot at the Spandau Studios in West Berlin and on location in the city. The film's sets were designed by the art directors Gabriel Pellon and Oskar Pietsch.

== Cast ==
- Lex Barker as FBI-Agent Joe Como
- Karin Dor as Liane Martin
- Siegfried Lowitz as Kommissar Brahm
- Rudolf Fernau as Prof. Erasmus
- Wolfgang Preiss as Dr. Primarius Krone/Dr. Mabuse
- Kurd Pieritz as Dr. Bardorf
- Walter Bluhm as Portier
- Hans Schwarz Jr. as Max
- Walo Lüönd as Kriminalbeamter Hase
- Heinrich Gies as Optiker
- Alain Dijon as Nick Prado
- Werner Peters as Clown Bobo/Martin Droste
- Zeev Berlinsky as Mann im Leichenschauhaus
- Carl de Vogt as Empfangschef

== Bibliography ==
- Bergfelder, Tim. International Adventures: German Popular Cinema and European Co-Productions in the 1960s. Berghahn Books, 2005.
- Kalat, David. The Strange Case of Dr. Mabuse: A Study of the Twelve Films and Five Novels. McFarland, 2005.
