= Heinrich Gies =

German actor

- Born: 22 June 1912; Siegburg, North Rhine-Westphalia German Empire
- Died: 26 April 1973 (aged 60); Hannover, Lower Saxony West Germany
- Occupation: Actor
- Years active: 1953-1972

Heinrich Gies (1912–1973) was a German film and television actor.

== Selected filmography ==
- Geheimakten Solvay (1953) - Kellner im ZK
- Der Teufelskreis (1956) - Major Weberstedt
- Die Millionen der Yvette (1956) - Heim - Polizeipräsident
- The Captain from Cologne (1956) - Dinkelburg
- Zwei Mütter (1957) - Amerikanischer Bezirksrichter
- Wo Du hin gehst (1957) - Otto
- Sabine und die 100 Männer (1960)
- Ordered to Love (1961) - Obersturmbannführer
- My Husband, the Economic Miracle (1961) - Artz
- Zu jung für die Liebe? (1961) - Schuldirektor
- The Marriage of Mr. Mississippi (1961) - Kriegsminister (uncredited)
- The Transport (1961) - Lohmann
- The Dream of Lieschen Mueller (1961)
- Auf Wiedersehen (1961) - Don Howley
- The Secret of the Black Trunk (1962) - Ellison, Chefinspektor
- The Invisible Dr. Mabuse (1962) - Optiker
- Sherlock Holmes and the Deadly Necklace (1962) - Texas Buyer
- The Squeaker (1963) - Brownie (uncredited)
- The Curse of the Hidden Vault (1964) - Wächter (uncredited)
- The Inn on Dartmoor (1964) - Spitzel
- Hotel by the Hour (1970) - Paul Rehschopf

== Bibliography ==
- Hutchings, Peter. Terence Fisher. Manchester University Press, 2001.
