= Revolt in the Reformatory =

1929 film directed by Georg Asagaroff

- Directed by: Georg Asagaroff
- Written by: Peter Martin Lampel (play); Herbert Rosenfeld; W. Solski
- Starring: Carl Balhaus; Vera Baranovskaya; Toni van Eyck; Wolfgang Zilzer
- Cinematography: Curt Oertel; Alexander von Lagorio
- Production company: Grohnert-Film-Produktion
- Distributed by: Atlas-Filmverleih
- Release date: 1929
- Country: Germany
- Languages: Silent; German intertitles

Revolt in the Reformatory (German: Revolte im Erziehungshaus) is a 1929 German silent drama film directed by Georg Asagaroff and starring Carl Balhaus, Vera Baranovskaya, Toni van Eyck. The film was based on a play by Peter Martin Lampel intended as an exposé of the youth justice system. The film was considered controversial, and was banned four times before its eventual release. The film's art direction was by Andrej Andrejew.

== Cast ==
- Carl Balhaus as Fritz
- Vera Baranovskaya as Fritz' mother
- Toni van Eyck as Fritz' sister
- Wolfgang Zilzer as Hans
- Peter Wolff as Erwin
- Julius E. Herrmann as Direktor
- Hugo Werner-Kahle as Hausvater
- Renate Müller as Hausvater's daughter
- Oskar Homolka as Erzieher
- Rudolf Platte as Erziehungsgehilfe
- Veit Harlan as Kurt
- Ilse Stobrawa as Lucie
- Willy Clever
- Friedrich Gnaß

== Bibliography ==
- Kreimeier, Klaus. The Ufa Story: A History of Germany's Greatest Film Company, 1918-1945. University of California Press, 1999.
