= The Heyde-Sawade Affair =

- Written by: Wolfgang Luderer; Walter Jupé; Friedrich Karl Kaul
- Directed by: Wolfgang Luderer
- Starring: Martin Floerchinger; Harry Hindemith; Walter Jupé; Marga Legal; Peter Sturm
- Music by: Wolfgang Pietsch
- Country of origin: East Germany
- Original language: German

Production
- Producer: Bernhard Gelbe
- Cinematography: Günter Marczinkowsky
- Editors: Wolfgang Luderer; Walter Jupé; Friedrich Karl Kaul
- Running time: 101 minutes

Original release
- Release: 3 June 1963

The Heyde-Sawade Affair (Original title: Die Affäre Heyde-Sawade) is a 1963 film produced for the First Programme of the German Democratic Republic (GDR) television. The movie has been produced by DEFA's Babelsberg Studio near East Berlin.

== Plot ==
After being responsible for the murder in round about 100,000 so called "euthanasia" cases in Nazi Germany until 1945, SS psychiatrist and physician Dr. Werner Heyde has lived uncovered under the pseudonym "Fritz Sawade" after the war in Northern Germany's Schleswig-Holstein. His true identity remains unclear over fourteen years occupied with medical expertises in postwar West Germany. His wife had declared her husband as dead and received for this time a pension for a widow of a psychology professor. After being captured by authorities, Dr. Heyde is found dead in his jail right before beginning of his trial.

== Bibliography ==
- Heidi Stecker: Opfer und Taeter: Tante Marianne und so weiter, in: Deutsches Aerzteblatt 103 (Ausgabe 28-29, 17.07.2006), Seite A-1982/B-1703/C-1647(In German)
- Jürgen Schreiber: Ein Maler aus Deutschland. Gerhard Richter. Das Drama einer Familie, Munich: Pendo-Verlag 2005. ISBN 3-86612-058-3 (In German)
- Eckhart Gillen: Gerhard Richter: Herr Heyde oder die Moerder sind unter uns. Die Auseinandersetzung mit den Traumata der verdrängten Geschichte in Westdeutschland, in: Eckhart Gillen: „Schwierigkeiten beim Suchen der Wahrheit“ (…), Berlin 2002, S. 186-191 (In German)
- Christiane Rothmaler: Sterilisationen nach dem "Gesetz zur Verhütung erbkranken Nachwuchses" vom 14. Juli 1933: eine Untersuchung zur Taetigkeit des Erbgesundheitsgerichtes und zur Durchführung des Gesetzes in Hamburg in der Zeit zwischen 1934 und 1944, Husum: Matthiesen-Verlag 1991 (=Abhandlungen zur Geschichte der Medizin und der Naturwissenschaften 60) (Zugleich Hamburg: Universitaets-Dissertation 1986). ISBN 3-7868-4060-1 (In German)
- Ernst Klee: Was sie taten - was sie wurden, Frankfurt 1986 (=Fischer Taschenbuch 4364) ISBN 3-596-24364-5 (In German)
- Karl Heinz Roth: Filmpropaganda und Vernichtung der Geisteskranken und Behinderten im Dritten Reich, Hamburg 1986. (In German)
- Klaus-Detlev Godau-Schuettke: Die Heyde/Sawade-Affaere, Baden-Baden: Nomos Verlagsgesellschaft 1998, ISBN 3-7890-5717-7 (In German)
- Friedrich Karl Kaul: Dr. Sawade macht Karriere. Der Fall des Euthanasiearztes Dr. Heyde, Frankfurt 1971. (In German)
- Alexander Mitscherlich / Fred Mielke (Hrsg.): Medizin ohne Menschlichkeit. Dokumente des Nürnberger Aerzteprozesses, (=Fischer Bücherei 332) Frankfurt am Main 1960. (In German)
