= Die Millionen der Yvette =

1956 film

- Directed by: Martin Hellberg
- Written by: Martin Hellberg
- Cinematography: Götz Neumann
- Edited by: Lieselotte Johl
- Music by: Ernst Roters
- Release date: 23 November 1956
- Country: East Germany
- Language: German

Die Millionen der Yvette is an East German film. It was released in 1956.

== Cast ==
- Josephine Back as Yvette Leblanc
- Wolf Kaiser as Maurice Daurignac
- Anne Dessau as Bertha, genannt Desirée
- Peter Herden as Dr. Robert Hellmer
- Otto Stübler as Dr. Neubach
- Gerhard Bienert as Bleichstetter, Bankier
- Sabine Thalbach as Elvira, Bankierstochter
- Hansjoachim Büttner as Direktor Huppertz
- Ruth Baldor as Frau Huppertz
- Rolf Defrank as Philipp Hupperz
- Axel Triebel as Brinkmann, Geldverleiher
- Wolf Goette as Von Uelzen, Landgerichtsdirektor
- Heinrich Gies as Heim, Polizeipräsident
- Hans Joachim Schölermann as Professor Thalheim
- Paul Rainer as Von Kloppstein, Generalintendant
