= Peter Wolff (actor) =

German actor (1911–1978)

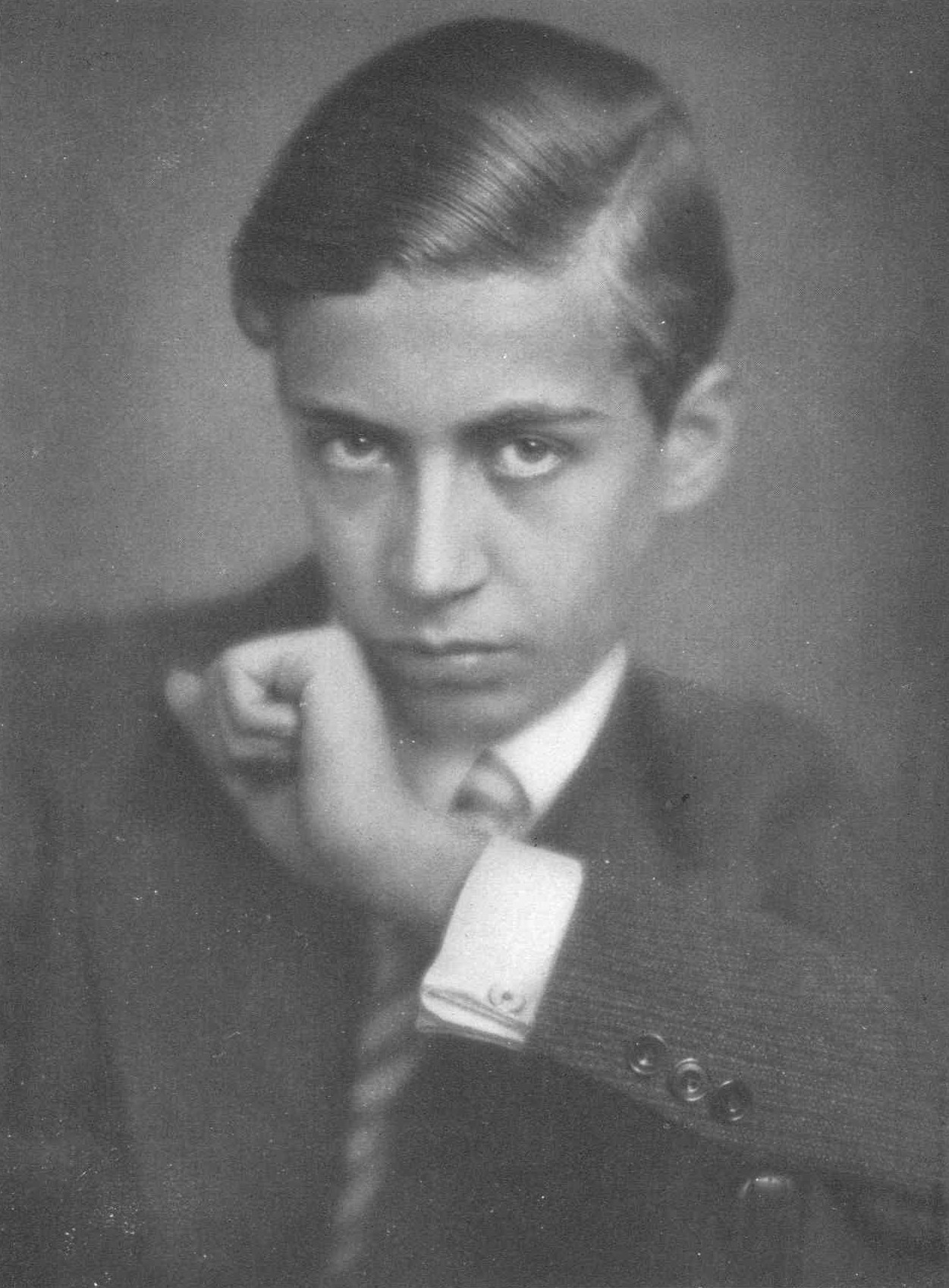
- Peter Wolff (by Franz Xaver Setzer, 1931)
- Born: Hans Martin Felix Wolff; 4 October 1911; Berlin, German Empire
- Died: 11 January 1978 (aged 66); Mountain Center, California, USA
- Other name: Peter Michel Norman
- Occupation: Actor
- Years active: 1920s–1933
- Spouse: Karin Vengay (m. 1950–1978)

Peter Wolff (4 October 1911 – 11 January 1978) was a German actor.

== Selected filmography ==
- Revolt in the Reformatory (1930)
- I Go Out and You Stay Here (1931)
- Seine Freundin Annette (1931)
- The Battle of Bademunde (1931)
- The Virtuous Sinner (1931)
- The Office Manager (1931)
- The Captain from Köpenick (1931)
- Geheimnis des blauen Zimmers (1932)
- Hände aus dem Dunkel (1933)
- The Rakoczi March (1933)
