= Hans Finohr =

German actor

- Born: 5 September 1891; Rynnek, West Prussia, Imperial Germany
- Died: 8 November 1966 (aged 75); Potsdam, East Germany
- Other name: Johannes Finohr
- Occupation: Actor

Hans (Johannes) Finohr (5 September 1891–8 November 1966) was a German actor.

== Biography ==
Finohr was born in the village of Rynnek, West Prussia, Imperial Germany and gained his first stage experiences at Heiligenbeil (Mamonovo). He worked at several theaters in Königsberg, Gera, Vienna, Mannheim and Leipzig. From 1943 to 1957 he worked at the Staatsschauspiel Dresden.

== Partial filmography ==
- 1952: Das verurteilte Dorf - Amerikanischer General
- 1953: Geheimakten Solvay - Lokführer
- 1954: Ernst Thälmann
- 1957: Schlösser und Katen - Der alte Sikora
- 1957: Wo du hingehst... - Mann
- 1958: Les Misérables - Un révolutionnaire #2
- 1958: Nur eine Frau
- 1958: Das Lied der Matrosen - Werftschreiber Schröder
- 1958: Tilman Riemenschneider - Bärtiger Bauer
- 1959: SAS 181 antwortet nicht
- 1959: An Old Love (1959) - Der alte Schwannaeke
- 1959: Intrigue and Love - Kammerdiener
- 1960: Always on Duty - Arthur Wedel
- 1960: Fünf Patronenhülsen - Pedro
- 1961: Ein Sommertag macht keine Liebe - Kaluweit
- 1962: Tanz am Sonnabend - Bruno Schönherr
- 1963: Praha nultá hodina - Siegfried Adler
- 1963: Sonntagsfahrer - Kontrolleur
- 1965: Tiefe Furchen - Pfarrer
- 1965: Solange Leben in mir ist - Ledebour
- 1965: Denk bloß nicht, ich heule - Bauer
- 1966: Die Söhne der Großen Bärin - Hawandschita
- 1968: Der Mord, der nie verjährt - Präsident (final film role)
