= Marga Legal =

German actress

- Born: 18 February 1908; Berlin, German Empire
- Died: 30 October 2001 (aged 93); Berlin, Germany
- Occupation: Actress
- Years active: 1952–2001

Marga Legal (18 February 1908 – 30 October 2001) was a German actress. She is the daughter of actor Ernst Legal and appeared in more than one hundred films from 1952 to 2001.

== Selected filmography ==
Year	Title	Role	Notes
1952	The Condemned Village		
1959	Goods for Catalonia		
1961	Five Days, Five Nights		
1962	Star-Crossed Lovers		
1963	The Heyde-Sawade Affair		
1967	The Banner of Krivoi Rog		
