= Georg Asagaroff =

Russian actor

- Born: 25 August 1892; Moscow, Russian Empire
- Died: 2 November 1957 (aged 65); Munich, West Germany
- Other name: Georgi Azagarov
- Occupations: Director, Actor
- Years active: 1915–1932 (film)

Georg Asagaroff (1892–1957) was a Russian-born actor and film director. He left Russia following the 1917 Revolution and settled in Germany where he directed several films.

== Selected filmography ==
- After Death (1915)
- Love of Life (1924)
- Eva and the Grasshopper (1927)
- Milak, the Greenland Hunter (1928)
- Escape from Hell (1928)
- Revolt in the Reformatory (1929)
- The Age of Seventeen (1929)
- The Green Monacle (1930)
- Das Donkosakenlied (1930)
- Checkmate (1931)
- The Mad Bomberg (1932)

== Bibliography ==
- Bock, Hans-Michael; Bergfelder, Tim, eds. (2009). The Concise Cinegraph: Encyclopaedia of German Cinema. New York: Berghahn Books. ISBN 978-1-57181-655-9.
