= Margot Ebert =

German actress, presenter, dancer, entertainer and writer

- Born: Margot Elisabeth Ebert; 8 June 1926; Magdeburg, Saxony, Germany
- Died: 26 June 2009 (aged 83); Berlin, Germany
- Occupations: Actress; Television presenter Dancer entertainer writer
- Spouse: Wilfried Ortmann

Margot Elisabeth Ebert (born Magdeburg 8 June 1926; died Berlin 26 June 2009) was a German actress, presenter, dancer, entertainer and writer.

== Life ==
Margot Ebert grew up in the great northern port city of Hamburg, but her first stage engagement took place in Erfurt. In 1952 she became one of the first presenters on her new country's recently founded DFF (National Television Broadcaster), working on numerous broadcasts from the purpose-built Adlershof television centre. She also took roles in various popular television dramas and was several times voted a "Television favourite" by viewers in the annual "Television favourites" poll.

Her annual appearances co-hosting the two-hour Christmas Television song-and-dance extravaganza "Zwischen Frühstück und Gänsebraten" ("Between Breakfast[-time] and roast goose"), which was screened between 11.00 and 13.00 on the first day of Christmas, are remembered with particular affection. She co-hosted the show every year between 1957 and 1991, except in 1984, in partnership with Heinz Quermann. She also entertained many fans with her leading role in the Tragi-comedy television series Maxe Baumann which ran between 1976 and 1982.

Margot Ebert was married to the actor Wilfried Ortmann until he died in 1994. She continued to live in Berlin till June 2009 when she unexpectedly took her own life with an overdose of pills.

== Filmography ==
- 1958: Sie kannten sich alle
- 1959: Ware für Katalonien
- 1959: Eine alte Liebe
- 1960: Liebe auf den letzten Blick
- 1961: Guten Tag, lieber Tag
- 1972: Ein Kugelblitz aus Eberswalde
- 1976: Maxe Baumann: Ferien ohne Ende (TV series)
- 1976: Krach im Hochhaus
- 1977: Maxe Baumann: Keine Ferien für Max (TV series)
- 1978: Maxe Baumann: Max auf Reisen (TV series)
- 1978: Hahn im Korb (TV comedy)
- 1979: Maxe Baumann: Überraschung für Max (TV series)
- 1980: Der Keiler von Keilsberg
- 1980: Maxe Baumann: Max in Moritzhagen (TV series)
- 1981: Mein Vater Alfons
- 1982: Maxe Baumann: Max bleibt am Ball (TV series)
- 1983: Polizeiruf 110: Die Spur des 13. Apostels (TV series)
- 1987: Ferienheim Bergkristall, episode 5: So ein Theater (TV comedy)
- 1989: Tierparkgeschichten
