= Louis Daquin =

French film director

- Born: 20 May 1908; Calais, France
- Died: 2 October 1980 (aged 72); Paris, France
- Occupations: Film director Actor
- Years active: 1937–1979

Louis Daquin (20 May 1908 – 2 October 1980) was a French film director, screenwriter and actor. He directed 14 films between 1938 and 1963. He also appeared in 11 films between 1937 and 1979.

== Selected filmography ==
- The Man from Nowhere (1937)
- Portrait of Innocence (1941)
- Strange Inheritance (1943)
- First on the Rope (1944)
- Patrie (1946)
- The Bouquinquant Brothers (1947)
- Mystery Trip (1947)
- Daybreak (1949)
- The Perfume of the Lady in Black (1949)
- Skipper Next to God (1951)
- Bel Ami (1955)
- Ciulinii Bărăganului (1958) (co-director, with Gheorghe Vitanidis)
- The Opportunists (1959)
- La Foire aux cancres (1963)
