= What Men Know =

1933 film

- Directed by: Gerhard Lamprecht
- Written by: Hanns H. Fischer; Hertha von Gebhardt
- Produced by: Bruno Duday; Eduard Kubat
- Starring: Hans Brausewetter; Erwin Kalser; Toni van Eyck
- Cinematography: Karl Hasselmann
- Edited by: Milo Harbich
- Music by: Eduard Künneke
- Production company: UFA
- Distributed by: UFA
- Release date: 11 January 1933
- Running time: 92 minutes
- Country: Germany
- Language: German

What Men Know (German: Was wissen denn Männer) is a 1933 German drama film directed by Gerhard Lamprecht and starring Hans Brausewetter, Erwin Kalser and Toni van Eyck. It was shot at the Babelsberg Studios in Berlin. The film's sets were designed by the art director Werner Schlichting. It was remade as the Swedish film What Do Men Know? the same year.

== Synopsis ==
A young woman from the country has a relationship with a travelling salesman who then abandons her. When she falls pregnant from the affair it causes a local scandal.

== Cast ==
- Hans Brausewetter as Karl Christians
- Erwin Kalser as Herr Barthel
- Toni van Eyck as Hertha Barthel
- Ruth Hellberg as Gertrud Kroschelt
- Ilse Korseck as Margot
- Eduard Rothauser as Invalide Schultheiss
- Elsa Wagner as Mutter Kroschelt
- Fritz Odemar as Oberpostsekretär Haber
- Hans Hermann Schaufuß as Vater Kroschelt
- Hedy Krilla as Fräulein Berghuhn

== Release ==
Leo Brecher attempted to release the film in the United States under the title Hertha's Awakening (Herthas Erwachen), but it was banned in New York.

== Works cited ==
- Waldman, Harry (2008). Nazi Films In America, 1933-1942. McFarland & Company. ISBN 9780786438617.

== Bibliography ==
- Kreimeier, Klaus. The Ufa Story: A History of Germany's Greatest Film Company, 1918-1945. University of California Press, 1999.
- Rentschler, Eric. The Ministry of Illusion: Nazi Cinema and Its Afterlife. Harvard University Press, 1996.
