= Otto Mellies =

German actress (1931–2020)

- Born: 19 January 1931; Schlawe, Germany
- Died: 26 April 2020 (aged 89); Zeuthen, Brandenburg, Germany
- Occupation: Actor

Otto Mellies (19 January 1931 – 26 April 2020) was a German actor on stage, in film and television, and a voice actor. He was known for his performance of the title role of Lessing's Nathan the Wise on stage 325 times.

== Life and career ==
Mellies was born in Schlawe, Germany (now Sławno, Poland). At age 16, he applied successfully for acting education at the Staatstheater Schwerin, learning with Lucie Höflich, the director of drama. He worked at various theatres, such as in Neustrelitz, Stralsund, Rostock and Erfurt, learning a broad repertoire. He played the Tempelherr in Lessing's Nathan der Weise in Stralsundd at age 20.

From 1956, he was a member of the Deutsches Theater Berlin, engaged by Wolfgang Langhoff. He turned to character roles such as Pylades in the 1976 production of Goethe's Iphigenie by Thomas Langhoff, with Inge Keller in the title role. During his 55 years on stage, he excelled as Lessing's Nathan, staged by Friedo Solter in 1987, which he played 325 times.

Mellies died on 26 April 2020, aged 89.

== Filmography ==
Film
Year	Title	Role
1957	Hellas ohne Götter	Speaker
1959	Intrigue and Love	Ferdinand
2007	According to the Plan	Wolf
2011	Stopped on Track	Frank's father Ernst
2013	Back on Track	Rudolf

TV
Year	Title	Role
1973	Seventeen Moments of Spring	Helmut Kolder
