= Call Over the Air =

- Directed by: Georg C. Klaren; Georg Wilhelm Pabst
- Written by: Kurt Heuser
- Produced by: Georg Wilhelm Pabst
- Starring: Oskar Werner; Lucia Scharf; Fritz Imhoff
- Cinematography: Willi Sohm
- Music by: Roland Kovac
- Production company: Pabst-Kiba-Filmproduktionsgesellschaft
- Distributed by: Union Film
- Release date: 5 January 1951
- Running time: 82 minutes
- Country: Austria
- Language: German

Call Over the Air (German: Ruf aus dem Äther) is a 1951 Austrian drama film directed by Georg C. Klaren and Georg Wilhelm Pabst and starring Oskar Werner, Lucia Scharf and Fritz Imhoff.

It was made at the Sievering Studios in Vienna with location shooting at the Dachstein in the Alps. The film's sets were designed by the art director Fritz Jüptner-Jonstorff. Although filming took place in 1948, it was not released for a further three years in either Austria or West Germany.

The film is regarded as lost.

== Cast ==
- Oskar Werner as Der Student
- Lucia Scharf as Das Mädchen
- Fritz Imhoff as Onkel Otto
- Ernst Waldbrunn as Makkabi
- Otto Wögerer as Der Alte
- Heinz Moog as Wartanian
- Ekkehard Arendt as Spitz
- Fritz Berger as Maccaroni
- Hermann Erhardt as Schiesser
- Josef Gmeinder as Schlafmütze
- Walter Ladengast as Der Geflickte
- Jürg Medicus as Dechiffreur
- Karl Ranninger as Kogler
- Rudolf Rhomberg as Piefke
- Evelyn Schroll as Regine Kogler
- Toni van Eyck as Frau Kogler
- Rudolf Vones as Funker

== Bibliography ==
- Fritsche, Maria. Homemade Men in Postwar Austrian Cinema: Nationhood, Genre and Masculinity. Berghahn Books, 2013.
- Eric Rentschler. The Films of G.W. Pabst: an extraterritorial cinema. Rutgers University Press, 1990.
