= Hellas ohne Götter =

1957 film

- Directed by: Karl Gass
- Written by: Hermann Schuch, Klaus Schehufer
- Starring: Otto Mellies
- Narrated by: Otto Mellies
- Cinematography: Ernst Laude
- Edited by: Waltraud Hartmann
- Music by: Wolfgang Hohensee
- Release date: 1957
- Country: East Germany
- Language: German

Hellas ohne Götter is an East German film directed by Karl Gass. It was released in 1957.
