= Doris Thalmer =

German actress

- Born: 20 July 1907; Frankfurt, Germany
- Died: 9 October 1998 (aged 91); Bad Saarow, Germany
- Occupation: Actress
- Years active: 1931–1992

Doris Thalmer (20 July 1907 – 9 October 1998) was a German actress. She appeared in more than 75 films and television shows between 1931 and 1992.

== Selected filmography ==
- Eight Girls in a Boat (1932)
- Anna and Elizabeth (1933)
- Intrigue and Love (1959)
- Bear Ye One Another's Burden (1988)
