= Hermann Stövesand =

- Born: 16 June 1906; Bochum, German Empire
- Died: 15 December 1992 (aged 86); Dresden, Saxony, Germany
- Occupation: Actor
- Years active: 1951-1990 (film)

Hermann Stövesand (1906–1992) was a German stage actor. He also appeared in several East German films in the post-war era.

== Selected filmography ==
- The Last Year (1951)
- The Axe of Wandsbek (1951)
- The Condemned Village (1952)
- Bear Ye One Another's Burden (1988)

== Bibliography ==
- Dieter Reimer. DEFA-Stars. Militzke Verlag, 2004.
