= Alwin der Letzte =

1960 film

- Directed by: Hubert Hoelzke
- Written by: Margret Gruchmann-Reuter (play); Erich Heller (play); Gerhard Hartwig; Dieter Scharfenberg
- Cinematography: Helmut Bergmann
- Edited by: Wally Gurschke
- Music by: Hans Hendrik Wehding
- Release date: 1960
- Country: East Germany
- Language: German

Alwin der Letzte is an East German film. It was released in 1960.

== Plot ==
Alwin Schmieder, his younger brother August and his friend Otto are the only men in the village who have not yet joined the LPG (the German equivalent of the Agricultural Production Cooperative). August, who have some expertise in chickens the question does not arise either, because he is only a servant of his brother, from whom he receives food and lodging, but rarely a payment. Alwin has been a widower for a short time and now realizes that he can no longer cope with the household without his Amanda. Although his brother helps him, his son Karl, for example, hardly helps out on the farm. He is in the LPG and has also met a "politician" in the city, who rejects Alwin without knowing her and wants to keep away from Karl at all costs.

Alwin has posted a marriage advertisement in the Sunday newspaper about Otto, which Otto has given up for the sake of discretion, under pseudonym as "A. Schmieder". August, on the other hand, also searches newspaper advertisements, but for fun. As a result, Alwin always has to intercept the postman so that August does not receive the wrong letters. However, the marriage idea is driven out of Alwin's mind after reading his wife's will, who stipulates that in the event of remarriage, Alwin must give two-fifths of his assets to Amanda's sister Berta. Charles, on the other hand, will lose his land in his will if he does not marry within a year.

LPG Chairman Ernst Baldauf has so far tried in vain to convince Alwin to give up one of his empty chambers for an LPGer. Karl's wife Bärbel, a politician, has now arrived in the village – and wants to convince Alwin to marry her. She appears by chance in the house of Schmieder to borrow a chicken catalog. Since she is already there, she cleans the living room and comes by more and more often the next few days to do the household chores. Alwin loves her and now does everything in his power to bring her together with Karl. He also dreams that she will move into one of the vacant chambers. Meanwhile, August meets the chicken farmer Karoline Gutjahr, who had actually responded to Alwin's marriage advertisement. Upon receiving the letter, August truthfully replies to Karoline that he already have a bride, who responded earlier, and therefore could not accept her offer. Karoline feels foolish and wants to talk to August.

When the misunderstanding is cleared up, they both realize that they like each other. August tells the bewildered Alwin that he will marry and live with Karoline – on her farm and will still be a member of the LPG. Alwin, on the other hand, was planning to talk to Karoline herself, as Amanda's will clause proved null and void because her sister Berta has already died. Alwin now has to accept further strokes of fate: Karl and Barbara explain to him that Barbara is Alwin's future daughter-in-law who is also a politician. However, Alwin takes it easy, because everything is seen differently if you know the person who is involved in politics. Meanwhile, Otto decides to join the LPG. He gives Alwin, who is now the last non-LPGer in the village, his double LPG application and Alwin is left alone. Slowly he unfolds the proposal and begins to read it.

== Cast ==
- Gerhard Bienert as Alwin Schmieder
- Paul R. Henker as August Schmieder
- Steffie Spira as Karoline Gutjahr
- Wolfgang Thal as Karl Schmieder
- Brigitte Krause as Barbara Wendt
- Karl Kendzia as Otto Kleinhans
