= Das kleine und das große Glück =

1953 film

- Directed by: Martin Hellberg
- Written by: Paul Wiens
- Starring: Bruno Atlas-Eising
- Release date: 1953
- Running time: 98 minutes
- Country: East Germany
- Language: German

Das kleine und das große Glück is an East German film directed by Martin Hellberg. It was released in 1953.

== Cast ==
In alphabetical order

- Bruno Atlas-Eising
- Ilse Bastubbe
- Helmut Bautzmann
- Werner Berndt as Gustl
- Fritz Bogdon
- Johanna Bucher as Hannchen
- Werner Buttler
- Hansjoachim Büttner as Stockberger
- Fritz Decho as Gotthold
- Heinz Dhein
- Jens-Peter Dierichs
- Otto Dierichs as Direktor der Bau-Union
- Susanne Düllmann as Erika Brandt
- Edgar Engelmann as Volkspolizist
- Rudolf Fleck as Karrer
