= Lotte in Weimar (film) =

1975 film

- Film poster
- Directed by: Egon Günther
- Written by: Egon Günther; Thomas Mann
- Starring: Lilli Palmer
- Cinematography: Erich Gusko
- Edited by: Rita Hiller
- Release date: 1975
- Running time: 125 minutes
- Country: East Germany
- Language: German

Lotte in Weimar (German: [ˈlɔ.tə ɪn ˈvaɪ.̯maʁ]) is a 1975 East German drama film directed by Egon Günther and produced by DEFA. It was entered into the 1975 Cannes Film Festival. It is based on the 1939 novel, Lotte in Weimar: The Beloved Returns by Nobel Prize–winning German novelist Thomas Mann.

== Cast ==
- Lilli Palmer as Lotte
- Martin Hellberg as Goethe
- Rolf Ludwig as Mager, the waiter
- Hilmar Baumann as August, Goethe's son
- Jutta Hoffmann as Adele Schopenhauer
- Katharina Thalbach as Ottilie von Pogwisch
- Monika Lennartz as Charlotte, Lotte's daughter
- Norbert Christian as Professor Johann Heinrich Meyer
- Hans-Joachim Hegewald as Dr. Riemer
- Walter Lendrich as Ridel, Landkammerrat
- Dieter Mann as Karl, the butler
- Angelika Ritter as Klaerchen, the lady's maid
- Annemone Haase as Amalie Ridel
- Gisa Stoll as Mrs. Riemer
- Christa Lehmann as Mrs. Meyer
