= Wo Du hin gehst =

1957 film

- Directed by: Martin Hellberg
- Written by: Eduard Claudius (screenplay and story), Wolfgang Ebeling (dramaturgue), Martin Hellberg
- Cinematography: Günter Eisinger
- Edited by: Lieselotte Johl
- Music by: Ernst Hermann Meyer
- Release date: 1957
- Running time: 90 minutes
- Country: East Germany
- Language: German

Wo Du hin gehst is an East German film. It was released in 1957.

== Cast ==
- Wolfgang Stumpf: Jakob Rhode
- Gisela Trowe: Thea Ricci
- Raimund Schelcher: Albert
- Gerry Wolff: Samuel
- Johannes Knittel: René
- Josef Kamper: Lutzer
- Alexander Papendiek: Juan
- Otto Erich Edenharter: Fernando
- Heinrich Gies: Otto
- Charlotte Küter: Ottos Frau
- Hansjoachim Büttner: General Walter
- Betty Loewen: Renés Mutter
- Friedrich Richter: Dr. Wolf
