= Toni van Eyck =

German actress (1910–1988)

- Born: Johanne Gertrud Antonie Eick; 23 October 1910; Koblenz, German Empire
- Died: 16 April 1988 (aged 77); Feldkirch, Austria
- Occupation: Actress
- Years active: 1929–1951 (film)

Toni van Eyck (German pronunciation: [ˈtoːni fan aɪ̯k]; 1910–1988) was a German stage and film actress.

== Selected filmography ==
- Spring Awakening (1929)
- Revolt in the Reformatory (1929)
- Painted Youth (1929)
- A Woman Branded (1931)
- Spoiling the Game (1932)
- What Men Know (1933)
- Call Over the Air (1951)

== Bibliography ==
- Taylor, Richard. Film Propaganda: Soviet Russia and Nazi Germany. I.B.Tauris, 1998.
