= Emilia Galotti (film) =

1958 film

- Directed by: Martin Hellberg
- Written by: Martin Hellberg (book); Gotthold Ephraim Lessing (play); Gerhard Neumann (dramaturge)
- Cinematography: Günter Eisinger
- Edited by: Lieselotte Johl
- Music by: Ernst Roters
- Release date: 1958
- Running time: 98 minutes
- Country: East Germany
- Language: German

Emilia Galotti is an East German film. It was released in 1958. It is based on the Gotthold Ephraim Lessing play of the same name.

== Cast ==
- Karin Hübner: Emilia Galotti
- Hans-Peter Thielen: Hettore Gonzaga, Prinz von Guastalla
- Gisela Uhlen: Gräfin Orsina
- E.O. Fuhrmann: Marinelli, Kammerherr des Prinzen
- Gerhard Bienert: Odoardo Galotti
- Maly Delschaft: Claudia Galotti
- Horst Schulze: Graf Appiani
- Gerry Wolff: Conti, Maler
- Karl-Heinz Peters: Angelo
- Alexander Papendiek: Pirro
- Eduard von Winterstein: Camillo Rota, einer von des Prinzen Räten
