= Ein Mädchen von 16½ =

1958 film

- Directed by: Carl Balhaus
- Release date: 1958
- Country: East Germany
- Language: German

Ein Mädchen von 16½ is an East German film. It was released in 1958.
