= Wolf Kaiser =

German actor (1916–1992)

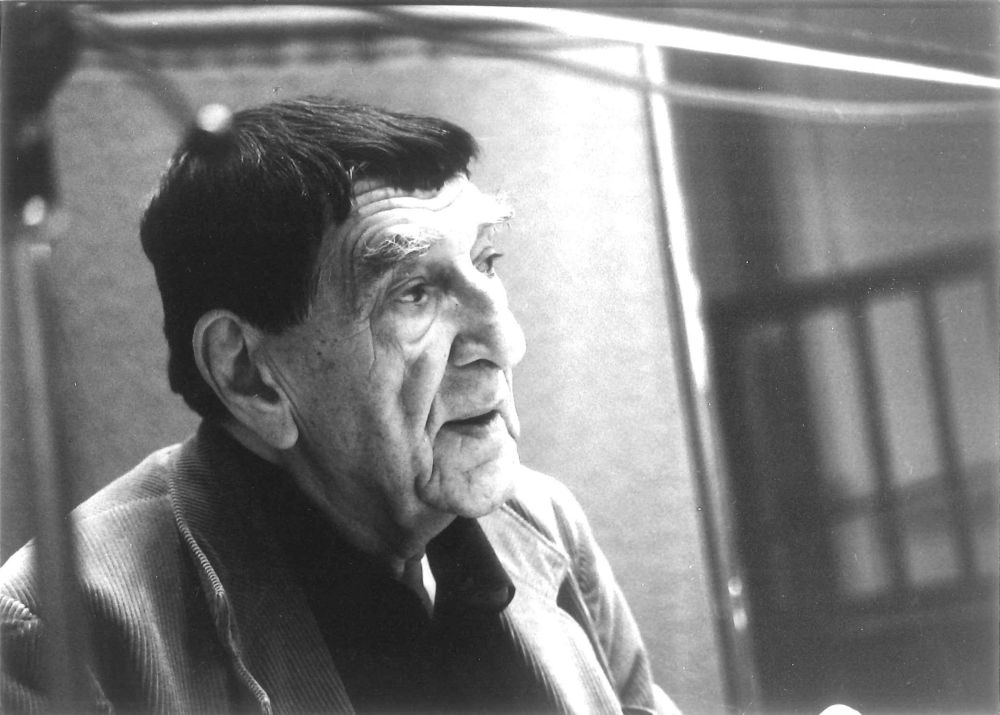
- Kaiser in 1989
- Born: 26 October 1916; Frankfurt, Germany
- Died: 22 October 1992 (aged 75); Berlin, Germany
- Occupation: Actor
- Awards: Art Prize of East Germany, National Prize of East Germany, Fatherland Service Order

Wolf Kaiser (26 October 1916 – 22 October 1992) was a German theatre and film actor. He grew up in Switzerland, where he studied chemistry and physiology. In 1937 he was deemed unfit for service in the Wehrmacht, and then went to Berlin where he trained as an actor.

== Career ==
Kaiser made his stage début in 1941 at the Stadtheater in Jihlava, Czechoslovakia, when that country was occupied by Germany. This led to Kaiser's engagement at the Volksbühne in Berlin from 1942 until 1945. Kaiser then had engagements in Frankfurt am Main, Munich and the Schauspiel Leipzig. In 1950 Kaiser returned to Berlin, where Bertolt Brecht recruited him to the Deutsches Theater and the Berliner Ensemble. Kaiser starred as Mack the Knife in Brecht and Weill's The Threepenny Opera in more than 450 times. Kaiser stayed with the Berliner Ensemble until 1967, becoming one of East Germany's foremost stage actors.

Kaiser had acted in films since the Second World War, including roles in Wolfgang Staudte's Die Geschichte vom kleinen Muck (1953), Kurt Maetzig's Ernst Thälmann, Sohn Seiner Klasse (1954), Martin Hellberg's Thomas Müntzer and Peter Palitzsch and Manfred Wekwerth's film of Brecht's play, Mutter Courage und ihre Kinder (1961). Kaiser's first starring role was in 1956 in Hellberg's Die Millionen der Yvette, and he was noted for his roles in Helmut Spieß's 1956 film version of The Valiant Little Tailor, Martin Hellberg's 1959 film version of Friedrich Schiller's Intrigue and Love and Robert Vernay's 1965 film Das Stacheltier – Das blaue Zimmer. From 1969 Kaiser concentrated his career on screen acting, including Peter Zadek's 1973 version of Kleiner Mann – was nun? and Egon Günther's 1978 television version of Ursula. Kaiser's last major film role was in 1981 as Casanova in Martin Eckermann's Casanova auf Schloß Dux. Kaiser appeared frequently on East German television.

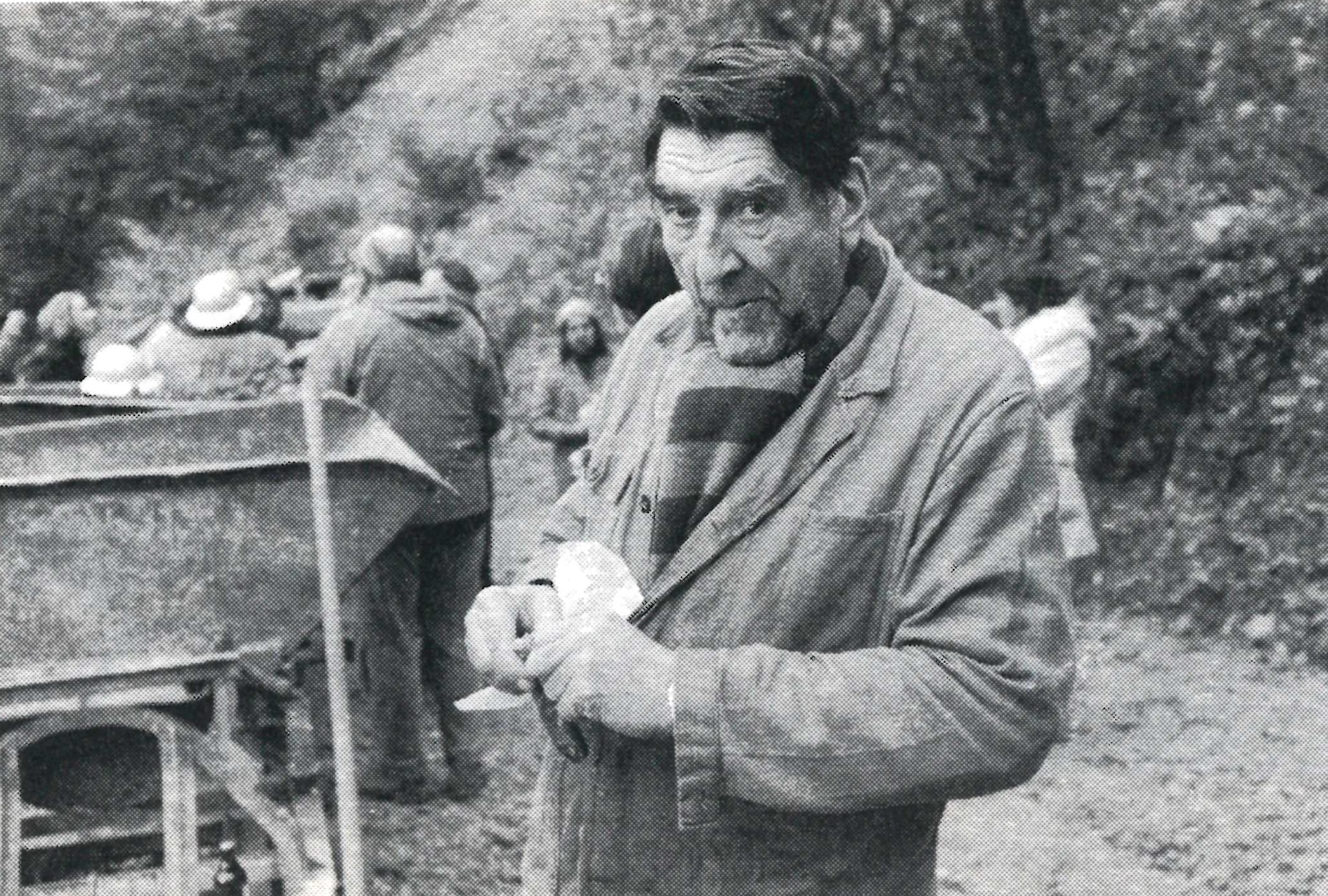
Kaiser in Der Stumme, 1976

== Death ==
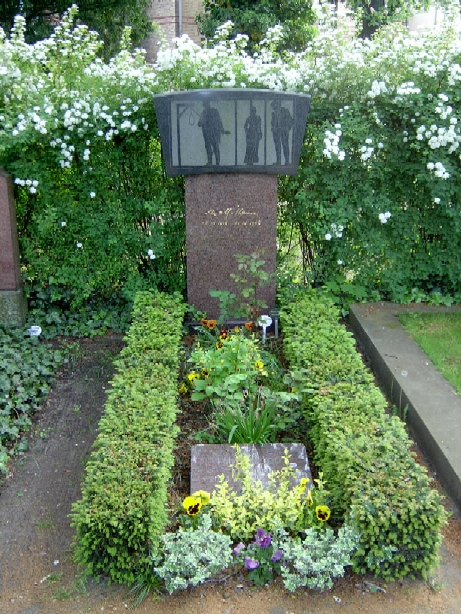
Wolf Kaiser's grave in Berlin.

Kaiser believed in and supported the East German Communist state. He was distressed at its collapse in 1989, its corruption that came to light after its fall and German reunification, and the return of capitalism and mass unemployment to eastern Germany from 1989 onwards. Kaiser committed suicide in 1992 at the age of 75. He is buried in the Dorotheenstadt and Friedrichswerder Cemetery in Berlin.

== Awards ==
- 1961: Art Prize of the German Democratic Republic
- 1965: National Prize of East Germany 2nd Class
- 1967: National Prize of East Germany 3rd Class for collaboration in Geduld der Kühnen
- 1968: National Prize of East Germany 1st Class for collaboration in Zeit ist Glück
- 1977: Fatherland Service Order in Silver
- 1981: Fatherland Service Order in Gold

== Selected filmography ==
- Life Calls (1944)
- The Last Year (1951)
- Intrigue and Love (1959)
