= Love's Awakening (1953 film) =

1953 film

- Directed by: Hans Heinrich
- Written by: Gustl Flemisch; Erwin Klein; Fritz Maurischat; Heinz Oskar Wuttig
- Produced by: Friedrich Wilhelm Gaik; Heinz Laaser
- Starring: Winnie Markus; Ingrid Andree; Carl Esmond
- Cinematography: Bruno Timm
- Edited by: Johanna Meisel
- Music by: Harald Böhmelt
- Production company: Algefa Film
- Distributed by: Admiral-Filmverleih; Falken-Filmverleih
- Release date: 22 October 1953
- Running time: 81 minutes
- Country: West Germany
- Language: German

Love's Awakening (German: Liebeserwachen) is a 1953 West German drama film directed by Hans Heinrich and starring Winnie Markus, Ingrid Andree and Carl Esmond. It was shot at the Spandau Studios in Berlin and on location around the Chiemsee in Bavaria. The film's sets were designed by the art directors Rolf Zehetbauer and Albrecht Hennings.

== Cast ==
- Winnie Markus as Sybill Berg, Pianistin
- Ingrid Andree as Anna, Enkelin des Töpfers Urban
- Carl Esmond as Michael Rainer, Maler
- Rolf von Nauckhoff as Peter von Prahm, Reitlehrer
- Carl Wery as Urban, Töpfer
- Elsa Wagner as Lina, Haushälterin
- Alfred Balthoff as Dr. Pilger, Rechtsanwalt und Notar
- Gisela Fackeldey as Fräulein Schlüter
- Eduard Wenck as Brinkmann
- Hans Emons as Jakob, Reitknecht
- Arthur Wiesner as Arzt
- Paul Bös as Jobst
- Otto Lengwinat as Dr. Döhler
- Günther Lynen as Martin
- Flo Nordhoff as Bender
- Heinz Schwarzlose as Taxator

== Bibliography ==
- Hans-Michael Bock and Tim Bergfelder. The Concise Cinegraph: An Encyclopedia of German Cinema. Berghahn Books, 2009.
