= Carl Balhaus =

German actor (1905–1968)

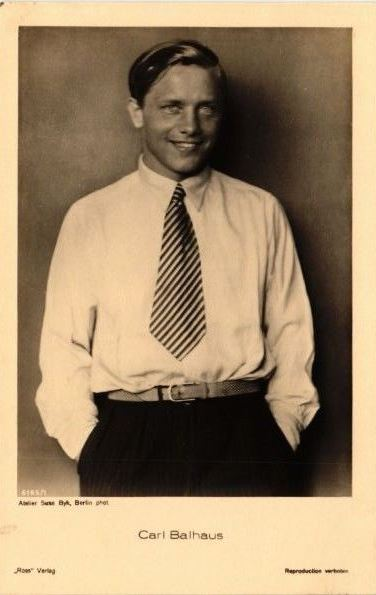
- Balhaus c. 1926
- Born: Carl Ballhaus; 4 November 1905; Mülheim, German Empire
- Died: 28 July 1968 (aged 62); Eisenach, East Germany
- Other name: Carl Ballhaus
- Occupations: Actor, director, screenwriter
- Years active: 1926–1968
- Relatives: Oskar Ballhaus (brother); Michael Ballhaus (nephew)

Carl Balhaus (born Carl Ballhaus; 4 November 1905 – 28 July 1968) was a German stage and film actor. After the Second World War he worked as screenwriter and director for the East German state-owned studio DEFA. He was an uncle of the Academy Award nominated cinematographer Michael Ballhaus.

== Selected filmography ==
=== Actor ===
- Der alte Fritz - 2. Ausklang (1928) - Ein Desserteur
- The Age of Seventeen (1929) - Gerts Freund Martin
- The Brandenburg Arch (1929) - Max
- Spring Awakening (1929) - Moritz, sein Sohn
- Revolt in the Reformatory (1930) - Fritz
- People in the Fire (1930)
- Scapa Flow (1930)
- The Blue Angel (1930) - Gymnasiast Ertzum / Pupil
- Westfront 1918 (1930) - Butcher (uncredited)
- Only on the Rhine (1930) - Karl
- A Student's Song of Heidelberg (1930) - Bornemanns Leibfuchs
- Father and Son (1930) - Louis de Lorche
- Großstadtpiraten (1930) - Cubby O'Brien
- 1914 (1931) - Gavrilo Princip
- Shadows of the Underworld (1931) - Jonny
- M (1931) - Leeser - the man who marks Hans Beckert (uncredited)
- Kinder vor Gericht (1931) - Ewald, der Zeitungsjunge
- Cadets (1931) - Kadettenunteroffizier von Zerbitz
- General Yorck (1931)
- Ombres des bas fonds (1931) - Jonny
- Man Without a Name (1932)
- Johnny Steals Europe (1932) - Monk
- Spoiling the Game (1932)
- Sacred Waters (1932) - Josi Blattrer
- Impossible Love (1932) - Erwin Hammer
- The Marathon Runner (1932) - Hans Huber
- Anna and Elizabeth (1933) - Martin
- Abel with the Mouth Organ (1933) - Peter
- Police Report (1934) - Schriftleiter
- In Sachen Timpe (1934) - Udo, ihr Sohn
- Einmal werd' ich Dir gefallen (1938) - Zunder - sein Freund
- The Fire Devil (1940) - Kärntner Bauernbursche
- Venus on Trial (1941) - Alfred, Peters Freund
- Geheimakten Solvay (1953) - Rudi
- Damals in Paris (1956) - Schäfer
- SAS 181 antwortet nicht (1959)
- Die schwarze Galeere (1962) - Mann im Mastkorb
- Viel Lärm um nichts (1964) - Antonio (final film role)

=== Director ===
- Der Fall Dr. Wagner (1954)
- Damals in Paris (1956)

== Bibliography ==
- Kosta, Barbara. Willing Seduction: The Blue Angel, Marlene Dietrich, and Mass Culture. Berghahn Books, 2009
