= Eight Girls in a Boat (1932 film) =

1932 film

- Directed by: Erich Waschneck
- Written by: Helmut Brandis; Franz Winterstein
- Produced by: Hermann Grund; Erich Waschneck
- Starring: Karin Hardt; Theodor Loos; Helmuth Kionka; Heinz Goedecke
- Cinematography: Friedl Behn-Grund
- Music by: Arthur Rebner
- Production company: Fanal-Film
- Distributed by: Terra Film
- Release date: 21 September 1932
- Running time: 81 minutes
- Country: Germany
- Language: German

Eight Girls in a Boat (German: Acht Mädels im Boot) is a 1932 German musical film directed by Erich Waschneck and starring Karin Hardt, Theodor Loos, and Helmuth Kionka. It was shot at the Tempelhof Studios in Berlin. The film's sets were designed by art director Alfred Junge.

The film was remade twice, as the 1934 American film Eight Girls in a Boat and as the 1958 Dutch film Jenny. Neither remake was a musical.

== Plot ==
18-year-old high-school student Christa realizes that she is pregnant. Urged to have an abortion by the child's father and rejected by her father, she is in despair. She gets support from her friends in the "Seeschwalben" rowing club. With their help, it is possible to persuade father and friend to rethink.

== Cast ==
- Karin Hardt as Christa
- Theodor Loos as Baumeister Engelhardt
- Helmuth Kionka as Hans Hellbach
- Heinz Goedecke as Fritz Lange
- Ali Ghito as Hanna
- Martha Ziegler as Frau Krüger
- Austin Egen as Singer
- Hedwig Schlichter
- Friedrich Ettel
- F.W. Schröder-Schrom
- Katja Bennefeld
- Hedi Heising
- Doris Thalmer
- Sabine Peters
- Gunni Dreyer
- Mary Norden
- Herti Kirchner
- Thea Dorree
- Elfi Richsteiger
- Helga Arndt
- Ursula Schummat
- Dolores de Padilla
- Edna Gray

== Bibliography ==
- Hake, Sabine (2001). Popular Cinema of the Third Reich. Austin: University of Texas Press. ISBN 978-0-292-73458-6.
