= Klotz am Bein =

1958 film

- Directed by: Frank Vogel
- Release date: 1958
- Country: East Germany
- Language: German

Klotz am Bein is an East German film, which was released in 1958.
