= Hotelboy Ed Martin =

1955 film

- Directed by: Karlheinz Bieber; Ernst Kahler
- Written by: Albert Maltz (play); George Sklar (play)
- Release date: 1955
- Country: East Germany
- Language: German

Hotelboy Ed Martin is an East German film. It was released in 1955.

== See also ==
- Afraid to Talk (1932)
