= Goods for Catalonia =

1959 film

Ware für Katalonien
- Directed by: Richard Groschopp
- Written by: Lothar Creutz, Carl Andriessen
- Produced by: Willi Teichmann
- Starring: Wilfried Ortmann
- Cinematography: Eugen Klagemann
- Edited by: Helga Emmrich
- Music by: Hans Hendrik Wehding
- Production company: DEFA
- Distributed by: PROGRESS-Film Verleih
- Release date: 13 March 1959
- Running time: 99 minutes
- Country: East Germany
- Language: German

Ware für Katalonien (English-language title: Goods For Catalonia) is an East German black-and-white film, directed by Richard Groschopp. It was released in 1959.

== Plot ==
At 1959, the People's Police notices a strange occurrence: the local demand for optical instruments increases, while the orders from abroad sharply decrease. Several detectives launch an investigation, revealing that a West German criminal named Hasso Teschendorf has been forging documents and using them to illegally obtain the goods, which he has been selling to the Spanish Army and to customers in Barcelona. After a long hunt, the smuggler is arrested just before he manages to flee to West Berlin.

== Cast ==
- Wilfried Ortmann as Hasso Teschendorf
- Fritz Diez as Captain Gerner
- Werner Dissel as doorman
- Peter Sturm as Mr. Dupont
- Gerd Michael Henneberg as businessman
- Manfred Krug as smuggler
- Eva-Maria Hagen as Marion Stöckel
- Hanna Rimkus as Sabine Falk
- Hartmut Reck as Schellenberg
- Heinz-Dieter Knaup as Hasselbach
- Ivan Malré as Bob Georgi
- Carola Braunbock as Charlotte Gansauge
- Dom de Beern as inspector
- Albert Garbe as Bachmann
- Herbert Grünbaum as Rösli
- Hubert Hoelzke as customer
- Walter Jupé as Erwin

== Production ==
At 1957, the West German criminal Hasso Schützendorf organized a complex fraud: his partners, using forged documents, managed to take possession on the entire stock of optical instruments produced by the Zeiss factory in Jena, East Germany. He sold them to clients in Barcelona. Schützendorf managed to escape justice, settling in Spain, where he lived as a rich man until his death at 2003. The film Ware fur Katalonien was loosely based on this incident, although the villain "Hasso Teschendorf" was caught in the end.

== Reception ==
Director Richard Groschopp was awarded the Art Prize of the German Democratic Republic in 1959 for his work on the film. He later received a letter from Schützendorf, who wrote him "Dear Groschopp, please be more realistic next time... Arresting me just before reaching the Brandenburg Gate? Are you that deluded?"

The German film lexicon described the picture as "a well-made crime film, with notably good acting."
