= Eugen Klagemann =

German cinematographer and still photographer

Eugen Klagemann (1902–1980) was a German cinematographer and still photographer.

== Selected filmography ==
- The Murderers Are Among Us (1946)
- Raid (1947)
- Nora's Ark (1948)
- The Court Concert (1948)
- Das Mädchen Christine (1949)
- The Marriage of Figaro (1949)
- The Merry Wives of Windsor (1950)
- Corinna Schmidt (1951)
- Der Fall Dr. Wagner (1954)
- Damals in Paris (1956)
- My Wife Makes Music (1958)
- Goods for Catalonia (1959)

== Bibliography ==
- Shandley, Robert R. Rubble Films: German Cinema in the Shadow of the Third Reich. Temple University Press, 2001.
