= Martin Hellberg =

German actor, director, screenwriter

- Born: 31 January 1905; Dresden, Saxony, Germany
- Died: 31 October 1999 (aged 94); Bad Berka, Thuringia, Germany
- Other name: Martin Heinrich
- Occupations: Actor, director, writer
- Years active: 1935–1985
- Spouses: Berta Gurewitsch (m. 1926–1935): Ruth Baldor
- Children: Igael Tumarkin
- Relatives: Yon Tumarkin (grandson)

Martin Hellberg (also known as Martin Heinrich, 31 January 1905 – 31 October 1999) was a German actor, director and writer.

== Life ==
Martin Hellberg was born in 1905 in Dresden, Saxony, Germany, as a son of a pastor. From 1922 to 1924, Martin Hellberg studied at the Dresdner Konservatorium. He was a pupil of the director Georg Kiesau. In 1931 he joined the Communist Party (KPD). From 1924 until 1933, he worked at the Staatlichen Schauspielhaus Dresden (theater). However, he was fired by the Nazis in 1933. He first worked as a freelance director and then became a senior director in Freiburg im Breisgau. Afterwards, the Nazis forbade him to appear on stage again. In 1935, Hellberg made his first appearance as a film actor in Die blonde Carmen. In 1952, following his debut as a director in The Condemned Village, he received the International Peace Prize for this film. In 1958, he was the director and writer of the movie Emilia Galotti. In 1959, he directed and wrote Kabale und Liebe, in which he also appeared as an actor. In 1962, he was the director and an actor in the film Minna von Barnhelm oder Das Soldatenglück. In 1964, he wrote and directed the movie Viel Lärm um nichts. In 1981, he appeared as Professor Reinhardt in the movie Mephisto, which was awarded with the 1981 Academy Award for Best Foreign Language Film.

Martin Hellberg was married to Berta Gurewitsch from 1926 to 1935. Then Gurewitsch emigrated to then-British Mandate of Palestine (now Israel) together with their son Yigal Tumarkin. Tumarkin's youngest son and Hellberg's grandson Yon Tumarkin is a well known Israeli actor.

After his marriage with Gurwitsch, Hellberg got to know his second wife Ruth Baldor. Baldor was an actress and appeared in several of Hellberg's films. The couple separated at the end of the sixties. During his last years as a writer, director and actor, Hellberg worked and lived in Bad Berka near Weimar.

== Selected filmography ==
=== Director ===
- 1952: The Condemned Village
- 1953: Geheimakten Solvay
- 1953: Das kleine und das große Glück
- 1955: Der Ochse von Kulm
- 1956: The Mayor of Zalamea
- 1956: Die Millionen der Yvette
- 1956: Thomas Muentzer
- 1957: Wo Du hin gehst…
- 1958: Emilia Galotti
- 1958: Kapitäne bleiben an Bord
- 1959: Kabale und Liebe
- 1959: Senta auf Abwegen
- 1962: Die schwarze Galeere
- 1962: Minna von Barnhelm oder Das Soldatenglück
- 1964: Viel Lärm um nichts

=== Actor ===
- 1935: The Blonde Carmen
- 1952: Story of a Young Couple - Möbius
- 1957: Das Stacheltier - Freie Wahl (Short)
- 1959: Intrigue and Love - Miller, Stadtmusikant
- 1961: Der Landarzt
- 1967: Pinocchio - Arturo
- 1968: Treffpunkt Genf (TV Movie) - Prof. Gerlach
- 1968: Ein Rüpel sondergleichen - Regisseur
- 1971: Sleeping Beauty - Spielmann
- 1975: Lotte in Weimar - Johann Wolfgang Goethe
- 1977: Ein irrer Duft von frischem Heu - Pastor Himmelknecht
- 1978: Marx und Engels - Stationen ihres Lebens (TV Series) - Direktor Wyttenbach
- 1981: Mephisto - Professor
- 1981: Aus der Franzosenzeit (TV Movie) - Amtshauptmann Weber
- 1983: Märkische Chronik (TV Series) - Pfarrer Weihmann
- 1985: Johann Sebastian Bach (TV Series) - Heinrich Ernesti
- 1989: Die gestundete Zeit (TV Movie) - Dunkelberg (final film role)

=== Writer ===
- 1956: The Mayor of Zalamea
- 1956: Thomas Muentzer
- 1956: Die Millionen der Yvette
- 1957: Wo Du hin gehst...
- 1958: Emilia Galotti
- 1959: Senta auf Abwegen
- 1959: Kabale und Liebe
- 1962: Die schwarze Galeere
- 1962: Minna von Barnhelm oder Das Soldatenglück
- 1964: Viel Lärm um nichts
