= Johann Heinrich von Dannecker =

German sculptor

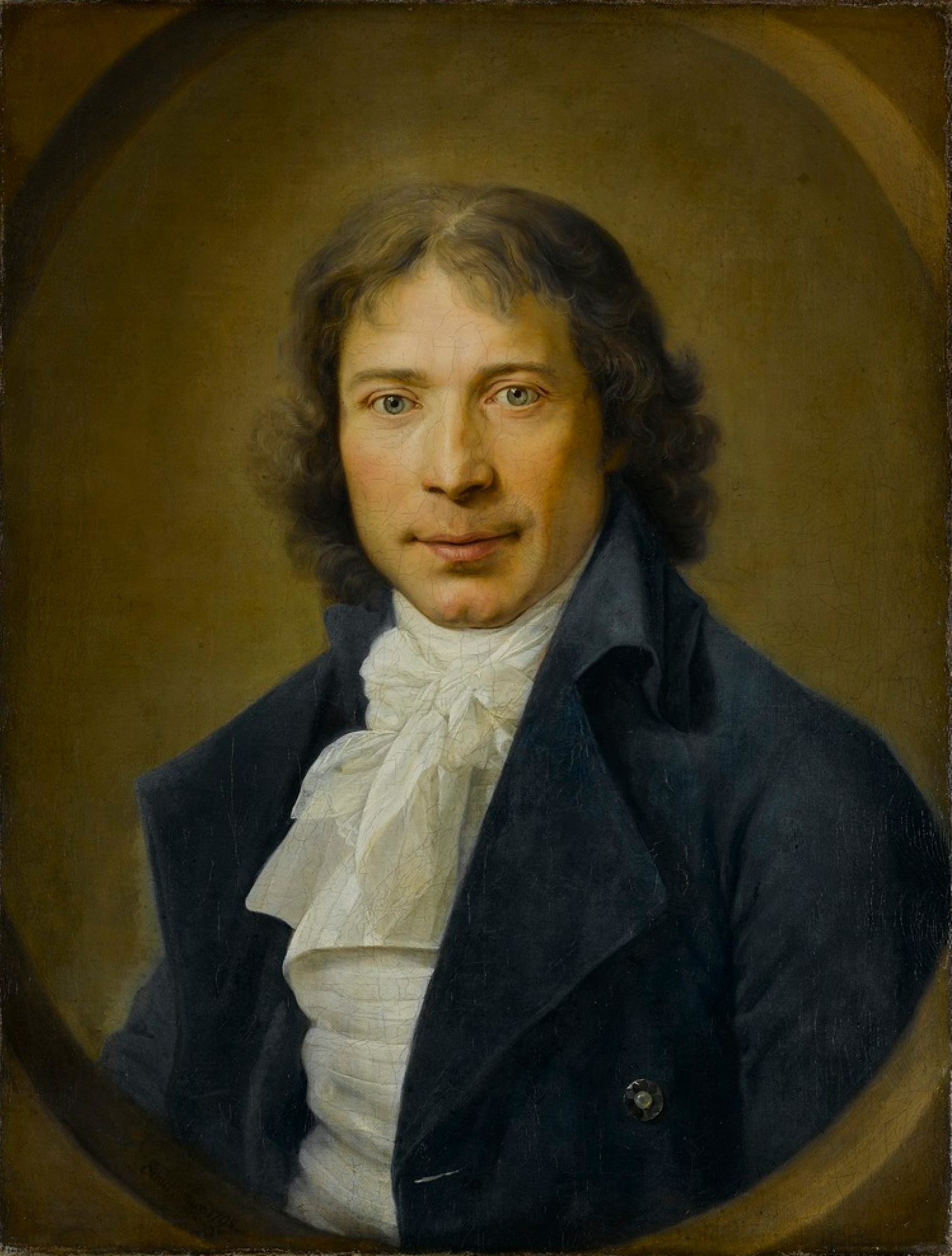
Portrait of Johann Heinrich Dannecker by Gottlieb Schick (1796)

Johann Heinrich von Dannecker (October 16, 1758 in Stuttgart – December 8, 1841 in Stuttgart) was a German sculptor and director of an art school.

== Biography ==
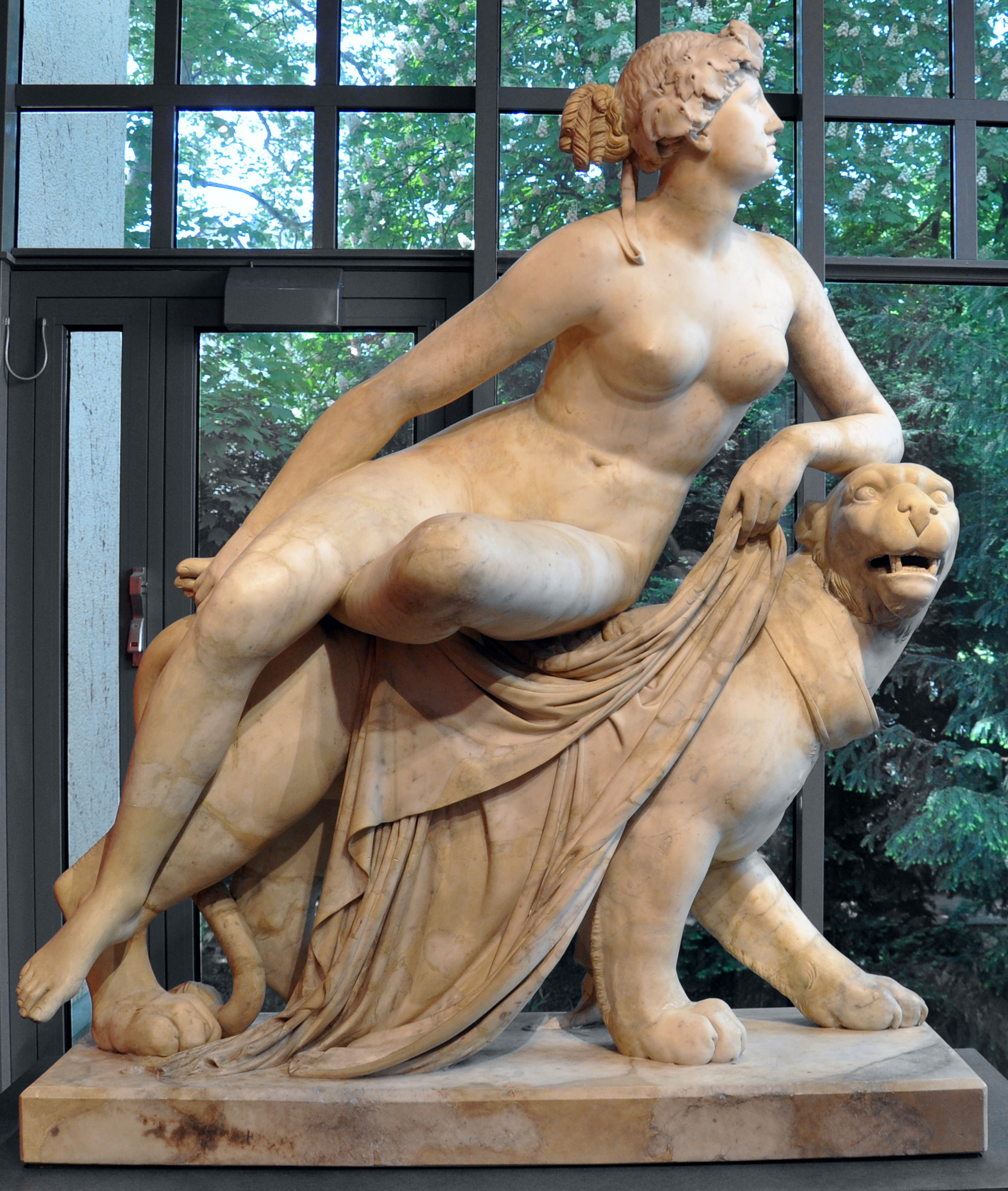
Ariadne on the Panther, 1810–1814, Marble, Frankfurt, Liebieghaus.

He was the third of five children of Georg Dannecker (1718–1786), a coachman of the nobleman Charles Alexander, Duke of Württemberg. In 1764, the family moved to Ludwigsburg (Baden-Württemberg). He was entered in the military school at the age of thirteen, but from 1772 to 1780 he was educated as a sculptor, together with Philipp Jakob Scheffauer. Initially, he studied under Adam Bauer and, starting in 1775, at the military academy at Stuttgart. In his eighteenth year he carried off the prize at the Concours with his model of Milo of Crotona. On this the duke made him sculptor to the palace (1780), and for some time he was employed on child-angels and caryatids for the decoration of the reception rooms.

After finishing the academy in 1780, he traveled to Paris, Rome, Bologna and Mantua and returned to Stuttgart in 1790, where he worked as a professor at the Hohe Karlsschule until 1794.

Apart from some short trips he never left Stuttgart again. His works now showed the double influence of his admiration for Antonio Canova and his study of the antique. The first was a girl lamenting her dead bird, which pretty light motive was much admired. Afterwards, Sappho, in marble for the Lustschloss, and two offering-bearers for the Jagdschloss; Hector, not in marble; the complaint of Ceres, from Schiller's poem; a statue of Christ; Psyche; kneeling water-nymph; Love, a favourite he had to repeat.

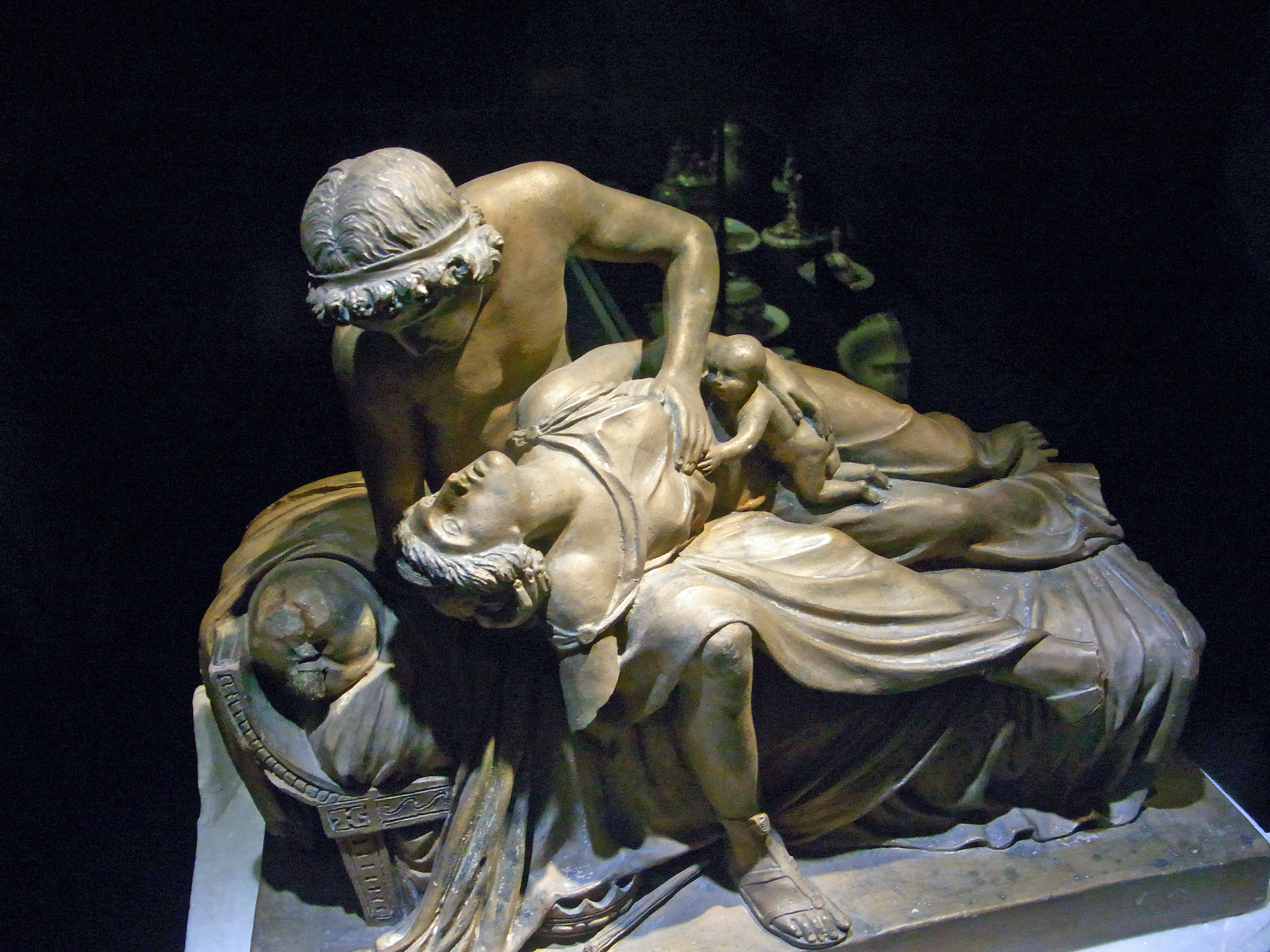
Memorial for Elisabeth of Württemberg, Landesmuseum Württemberg

In 1803, he made a first terracotta model of "Ariadne on the Panther", which he executed in marble between c.1810 and 1814. This is generally regarded as his masterpiece and one of the most important sculptures of the nineteenth century (today in the Liebieghaus, Frankfurt). In 1810, the Frankfurt banker Simon Moritz von Bethmann signed the contract for the marble version. He built a small neoclassical museum (known as the Bethmann Museum) in his garden which was completed in 1816 (today Seilerstraße 34). Open to the public, this was Frankfurt's first purpose-built museum building. Numerous visitors from all over Europe visited and admired the Ariadne. Small-scale replicas, such as those made by Meissen and Minton, were popular souvenirs and fashionable decorations. In 1853 the building and the small park were sold to the city of Frankfurt and the collection reopened in 1856 in the Ariadneum, an octagonal annex to the Bethmann family's house (architects: Johann Georg Kayser and his son Ferdinand August). In 1941, the Bethmann family donated the museum and the collection to the city of Frankfurt. However, the sculpture was severely damaged by fire in 1943 and could only be restored in 1977–78.

After the death of his schooltime friend Friedrich Schiller, Dannecker created a bust of him, which was copied by his sculptor friend Reinhold Begas for the monumental Schiller statue erected on Berlin's Gendarmenmarkt. In 1823 and 1824 he created a bust of John the Baptist.

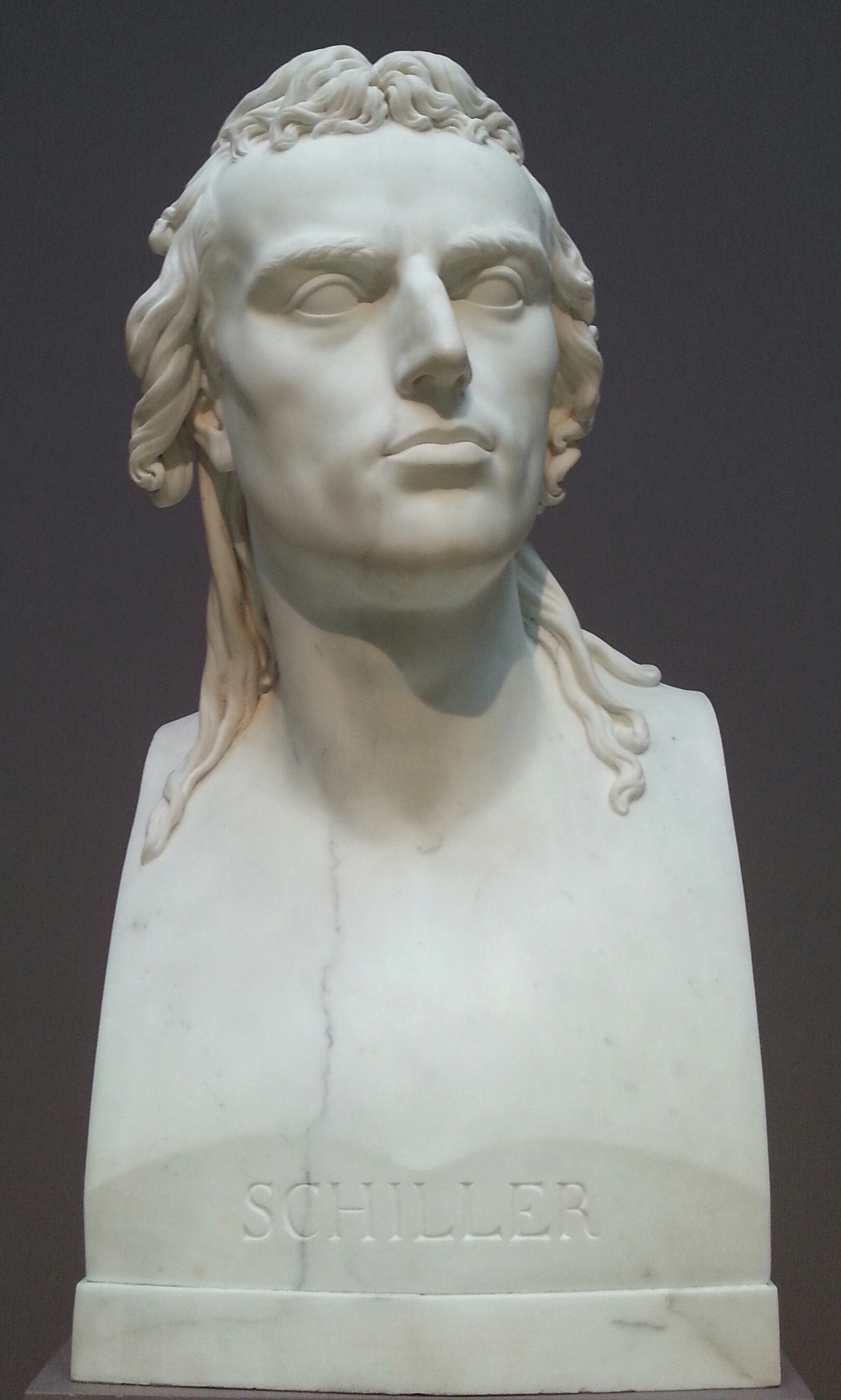
Friedrich von Schiller
