= Gerda Müller =

German actress

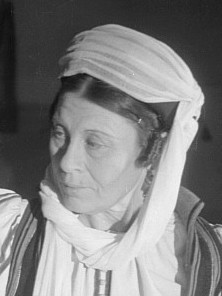
- Müller as Sittah in Nathan der Weise in 1945
- Born: 30 July 1894; Rößel, East Prussia, Germany
- Died: 26 April 1951 (aged 56); Berlin, East Germany
- Occupation: Stage actress
- Spouse(s): Hermann Scherchen 1927; Hans Lohmeyer 1931

Gerda Müller (30 July 1894 – 26 April 1951) was a German stage actress.

== Life ==
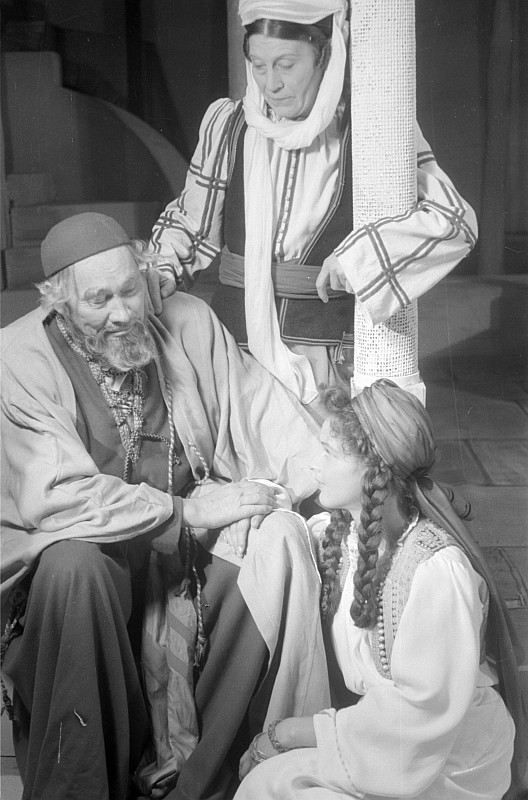
Müller (acting as Sittah) with Kurt Wegener (acting as Nathan the Wise) and Agathe Poschmann (acting as Recha) in Berlin in September 1945

Gerda Müller was born near Rößel (since 1945 part of Poland) in rural East Prussia. She studied at the "Max Reinhardt" stage school (as it was known at the time) in Berlin, where she was taught by Lucie Höflich, Hermine Körner and Eduard von Winterstein. Between 1917 and 1922 she worked at the Schauspielhaus in Frankfurt. At Frankfurt she was in the original production of Arnolt Bronnen's Vatermord ("Patricide"). In 1922 she moved to Berlin where she worked with Leopold Jessner at the Prussian State Theatre, which at that time was one of Germany's top theatres. During her time in Berlin with the State Theatre company she also made regular guest appearances at the Deutsches Theater, the Lessing Theater and the Schiller Theater, working with leading directors such as Heinz Hilpert and Bertolt Brecht.

She married the orchestral conductor Hermann Scherchen in 1927: they separated soon afterwards, but not amicably. She had affairs, including one with Carl Zuckmayer who referred to her as the Lithuanian vixen on account of her apparent vitality. In 1931 Müller married Hans Lohmeyer, the Lord Mayor of Königsberg.

In January 1933, the Nazi Party took power and systematically switched Germany over to a one-party dictatorship. Müller's husband was not a member of the Nazi Party and was suspended from his mayoral duties. Gerda Müller also retired to private life during the twelve Nazi years, possibly due to a severe lung infection. Other sources indicate that a stage ban was imposed on her in connection with complications following the non-consensual ending of her earlier marriage with Hermann Scherchen.

After the war, the eastern part of Berlin was part of a larger Soviet occupation zone. The Deutsches Theater reopened in September 1945 under the leadership of Gustav von Wangenheim, and Gerda Müller was a member of the company. Between 1945 and her death in 1951 she played a succession of leading roles. Shortly before she died she headed the cast in Brecht's Mother Courage.

== Selected filmography ==
- The Cuckoos (1949)
- The Last Year (1951)
