= Lohmeyer =

Lohmeyer is a German surname. Notable people with the surname include:

- Ernst Lohmeyer (1890–1946), German scholar and theologian
- Hans Lohmeyer (1881–1968), German jurist and Lord Mayor of Königsberg
- John Lohmeyer (born 1951), American football player
- Peter Lohmeyer (born 1962), German actor
