= Agathe Poschmann =

German actress (born 1922)

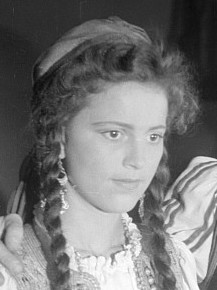
- Poschmann in 1945
- Born: 18 January 1922; Bochum
- Occupation: Actress

Agathe Poschmann (born 18 January 1922) is a German actress of stage, radio and film. She frequently played a young lover on the stage.

== Life ==
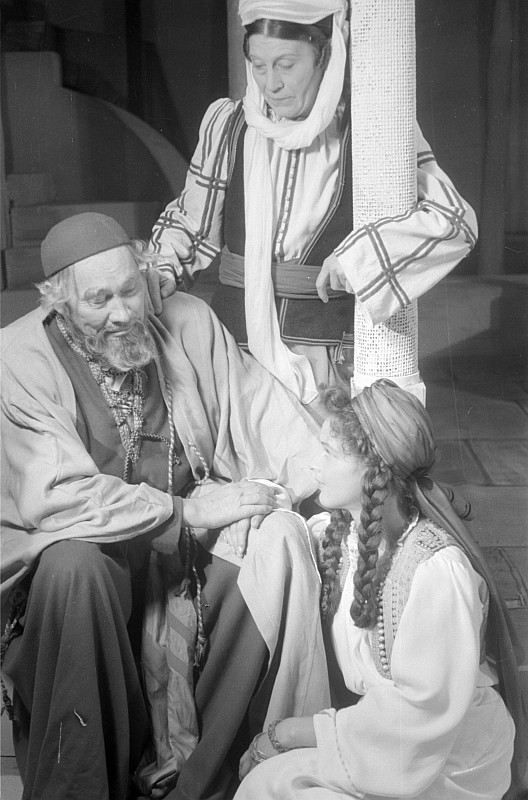
Poschmann (acting as Recha) with Kurt Wegener (acting as Nathan the Wise) and Gerda Müller (acting as Sittah) in Berlin in September 1945

Poschmann was born in Bochum, North Rhine-Westphalia in 1922. She trained in Berlin from 1940 to 1942 making her debut in 1943. After the war, the eastern part of Berlin was part of a larger Soviet occupation zone. The Deutsches Theater reopened in September 1945 under the leadership of Gustav von Wangenheim, and she was a member of the company. She appeared as "Recha" with Gerda Müller in a production of Lessing's Nathan the Wise at the Deutsches Theater, Berlin.

Poschmann had a leading role in the film Raid, alongside Paul Bildt, which was released in 1947. She was interviewed in detail about this role as part of the DEFA culture film documentary Der Augenzeuge. She also took radio roles, where she mostly also interpreted classical stage characters such as "Olivia" in Goethe's Groß-Kophta (Berliner Rundfunk 1948), "Klärchen" in Goethe's Egmont (Berliner Rundfunk 1949), "Julia" in Shakespeare's Romeo and Juliet (NWDR 1950), and "Klara" in Friedrich Hebbel's Maria Magdalene.

== Selected filmography ==
- Raid (1947)
