= Reinhold Begas =

German sculptor (1831–1911)

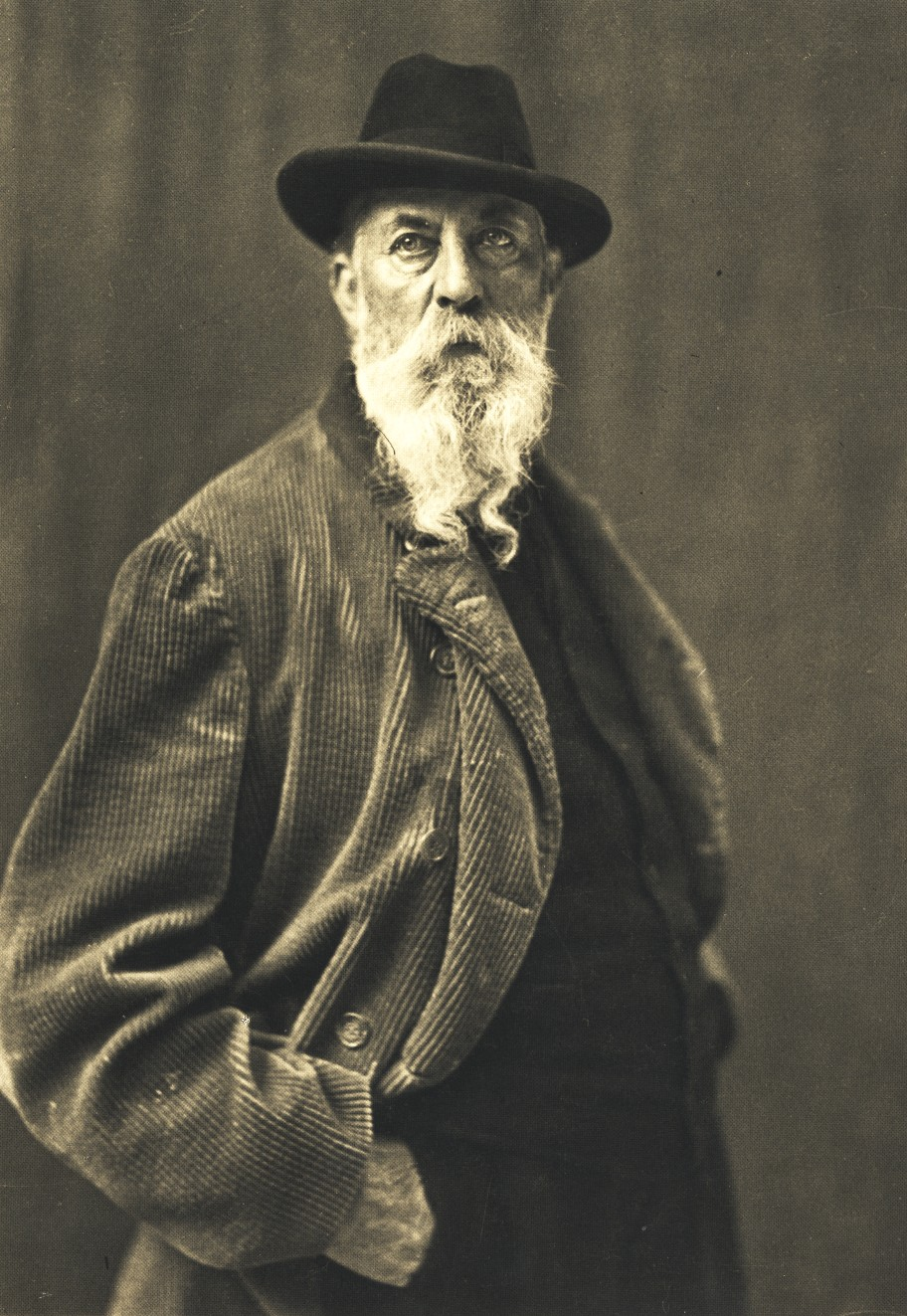
- Photograph by Jacob Hilsdorf
- Born: 31 July 1831; Schöneberg, Kingdom of Prussia
- Died: 3 August 1911 (aged 80); Berlin, Kingdom of Prussia, German Empire
- Education: Christian Daniel Rauch, Ludwig Wilhelm Wichmann
- Known for: Sculpture

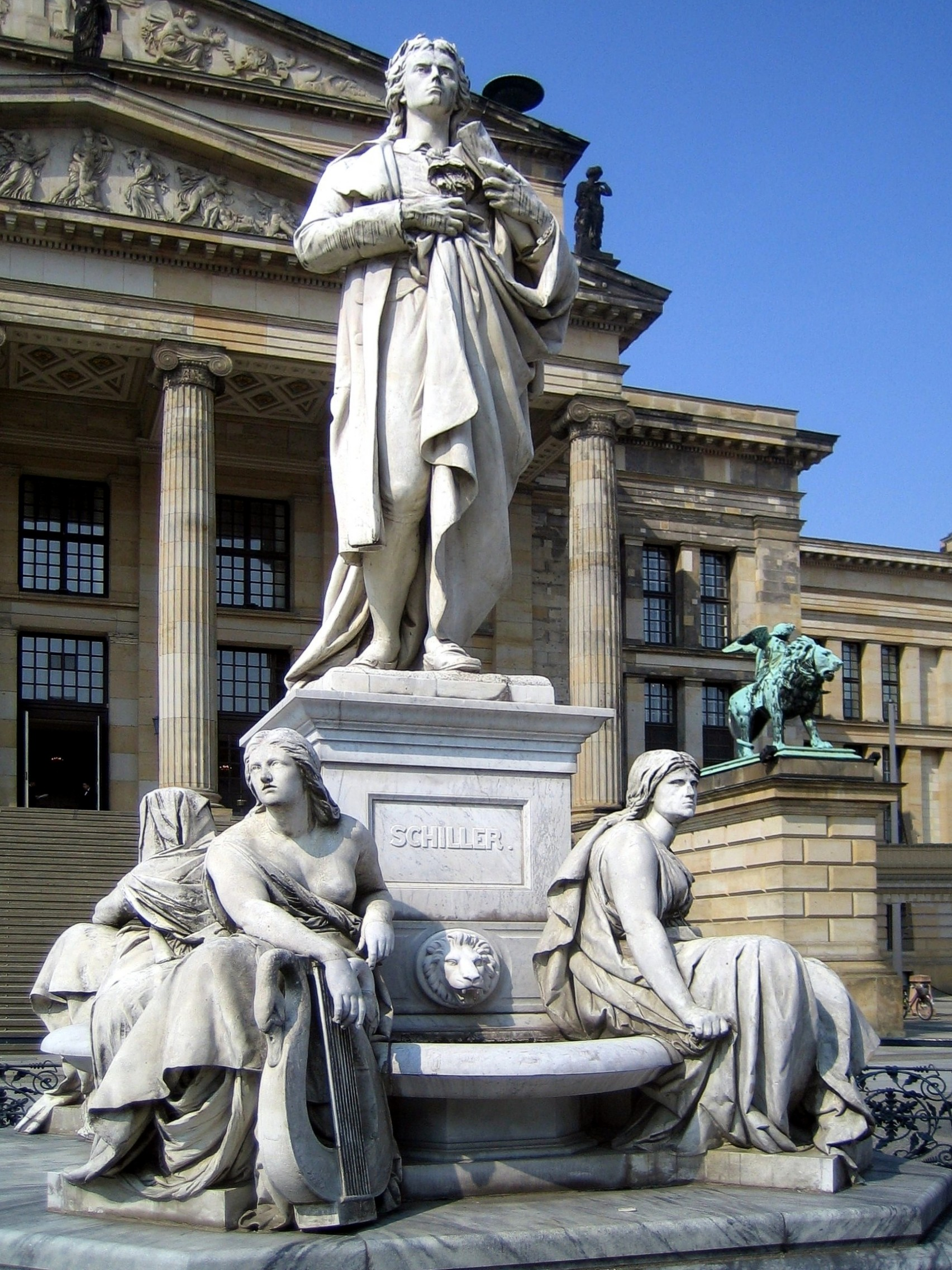
Schiller Monument on Gendarmenmarkt in Berlin

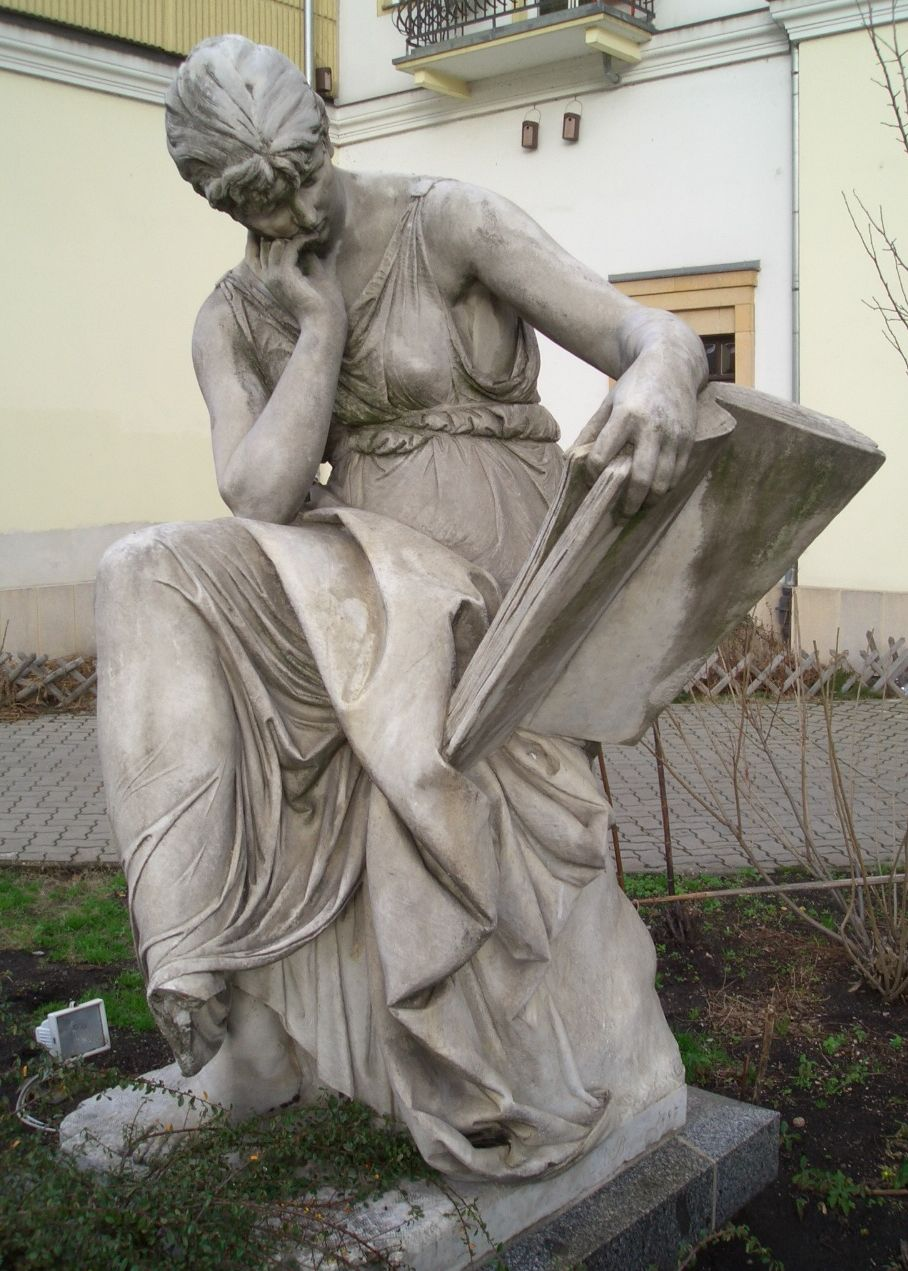
Studying the classics on war strategy

Reinhold Begas (15 July 1831 – 3 August 1911) was a German sculptor.

== Biography ==
Begas was born in Berlin, son of the painter Carl Joseph Begas. He received his early education (1846–1851) studying under Christian Daniel Rauch and Ludwig Wilhelm Wichmann. During a period of study in Italy, from 1856 to 1858, he was influenced by Arnold Böcklin and Franz von Lenbach in the direction of a naturalistic style in sculpture. This tendency was marked in the group Borussia, executed for the facade of the exchange in Berlin, which first brought him into general notice.

In 1861 Begas was appointed professor at the art school at Weimar, but retained the appointment only a few months. That he was chosen, after competition, to execute the statue of Friedrich Schiller for the Gendarmenmarkt in Berlin, was a high tribute to the fame he had already acquired, and the result, one of the finest statues in the German metropolis, entirely justified his selection. Since the year 1870, Begas dominated the plastic art in the Kingdom of Prussia, but especially in Berlin. Among his chief works during this period are the colossal statue of Borussia for the Hall of Glory; the Neptune fountain in bronze on the Schlossplatz; the statue of Alexander von Humboldt, and the Kaiser-Wilhelm-Nationaldenkmal, all in Berlin; the sarcophagus of Emperor Frederick III in the mausoleum of the Church of Peace at Potsdam; and, lastly, the national monument to Emperor William I, the statue of Otto von Bismarck before the Reichstag building, and several of the statues in the Siegesallee.

== Gallery ==
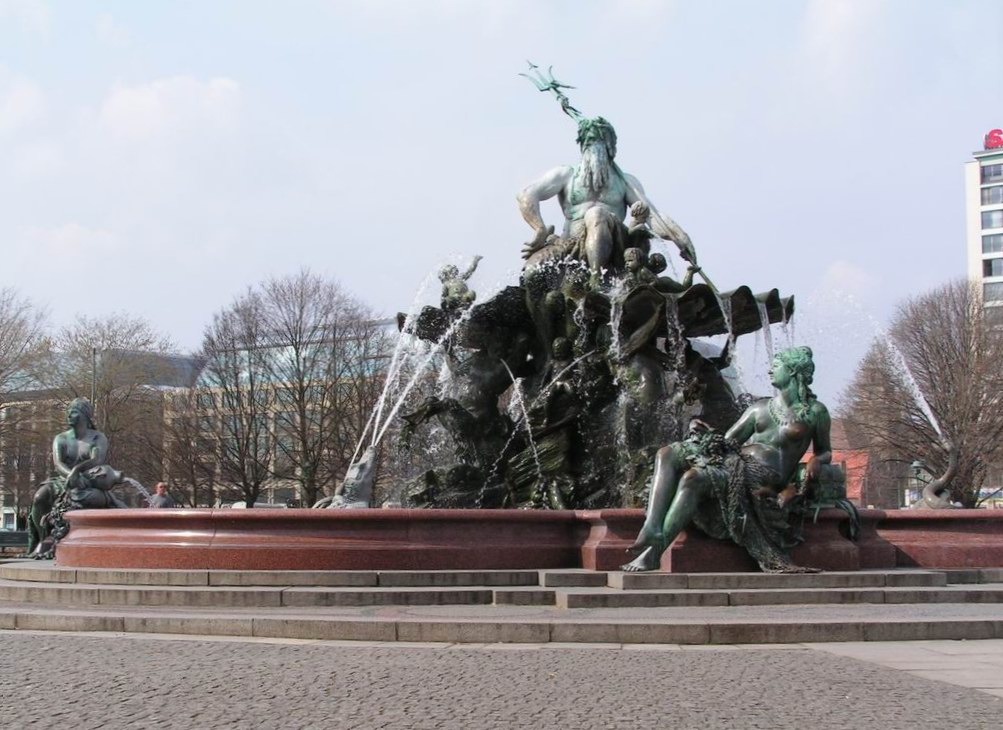
Neptunbrunnen in Berlin, near Alexanderplatz

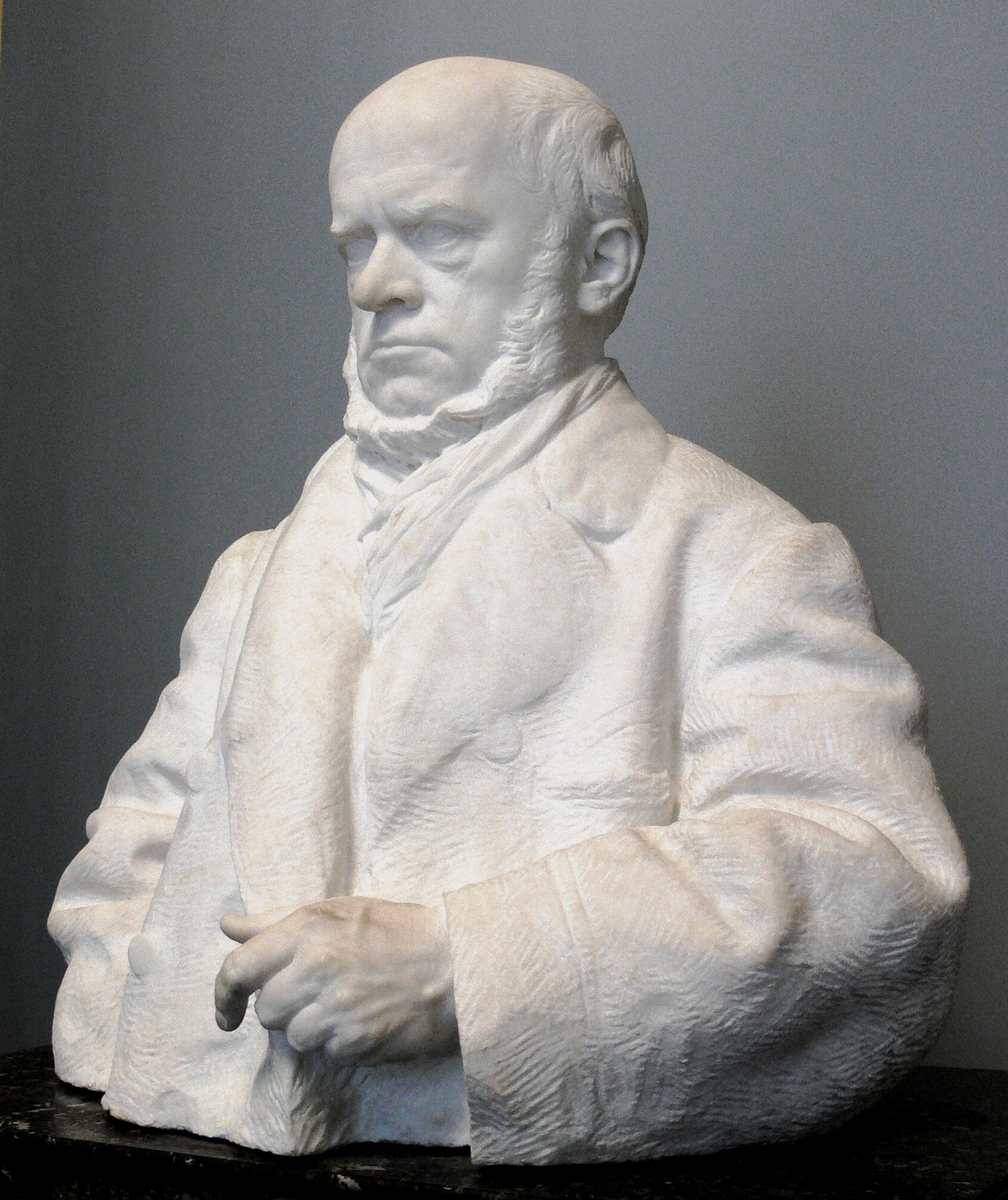
Bust of Adolph von Menzel, around 1875/76

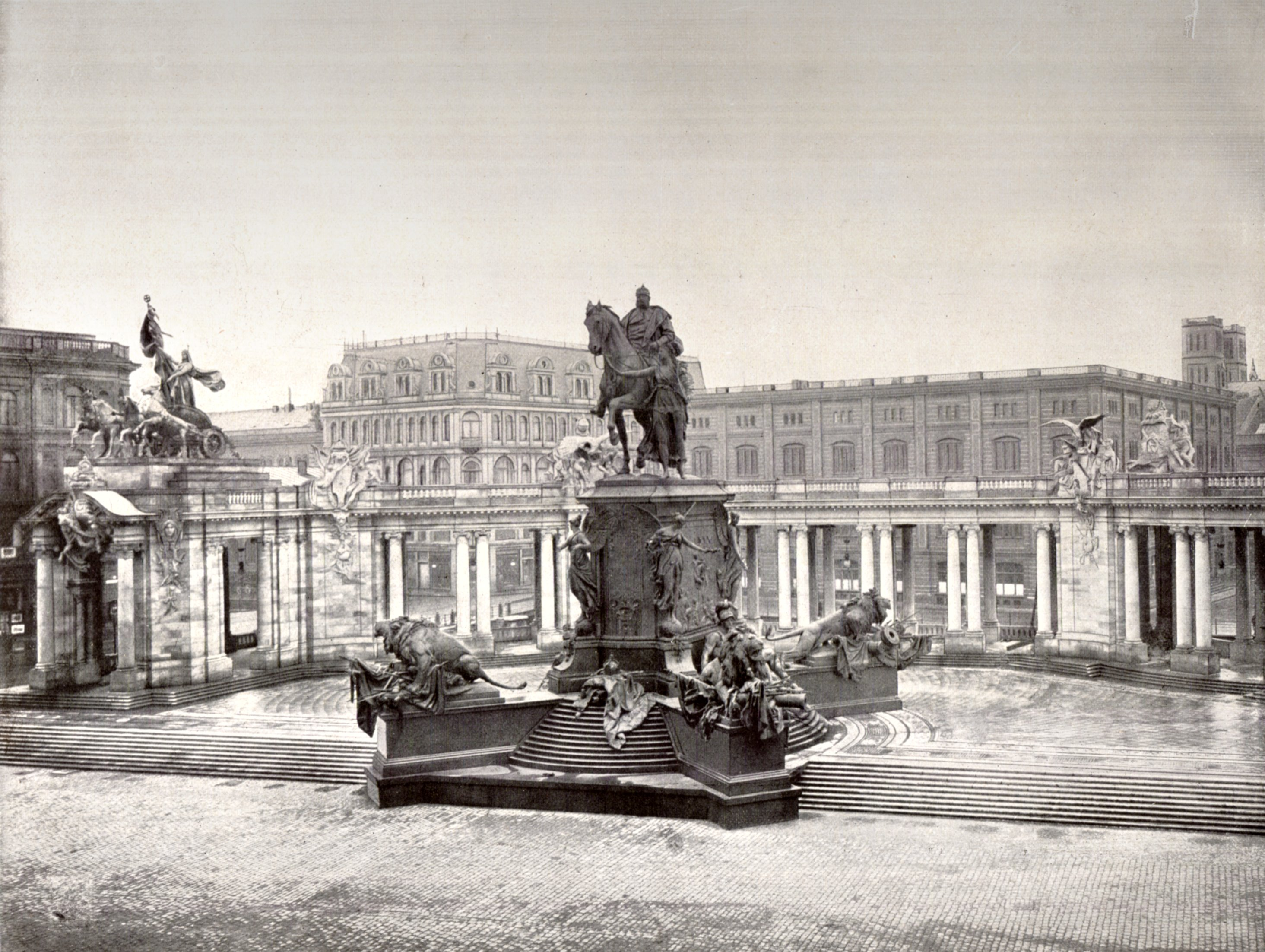
Kaiser-Wilhelm- Nationaldenkmal (destroyed by the SED)

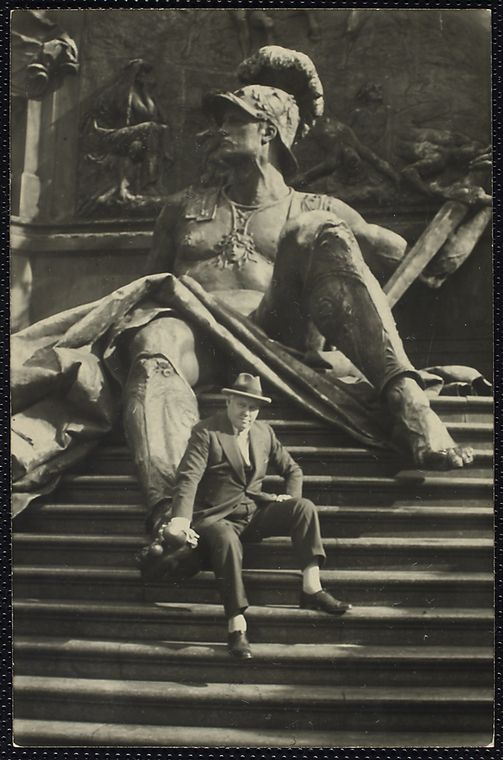
Carl Van Vechten in front of Mars

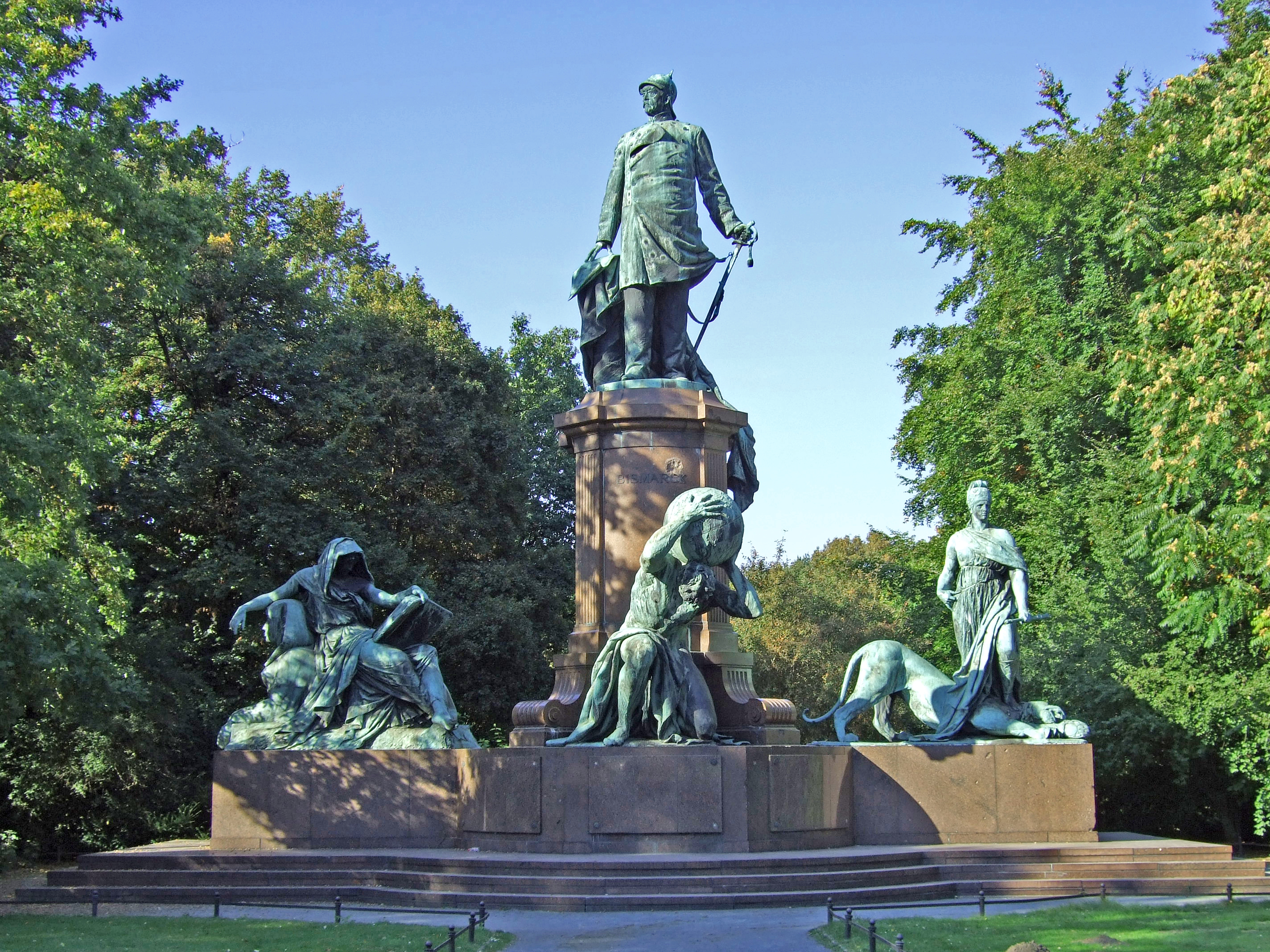
Bismarck-Nationaldenkmal

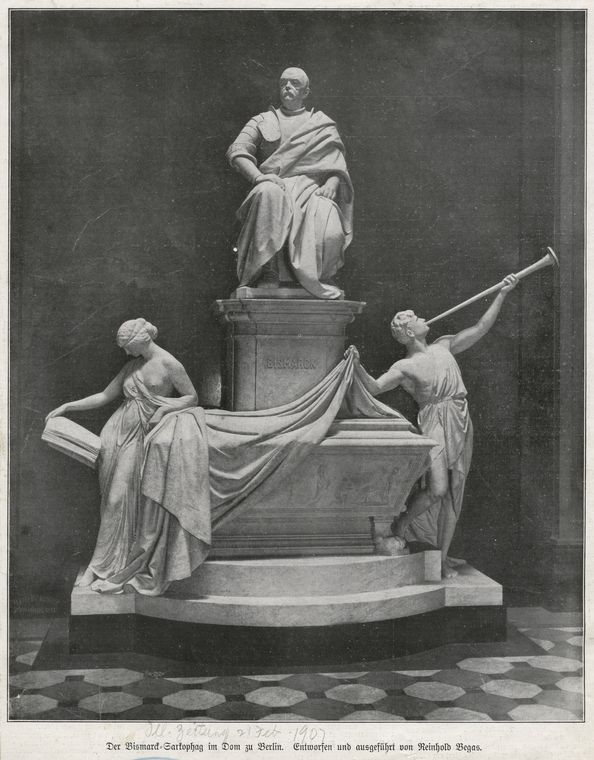
Cenotaph of Bismarck (model)

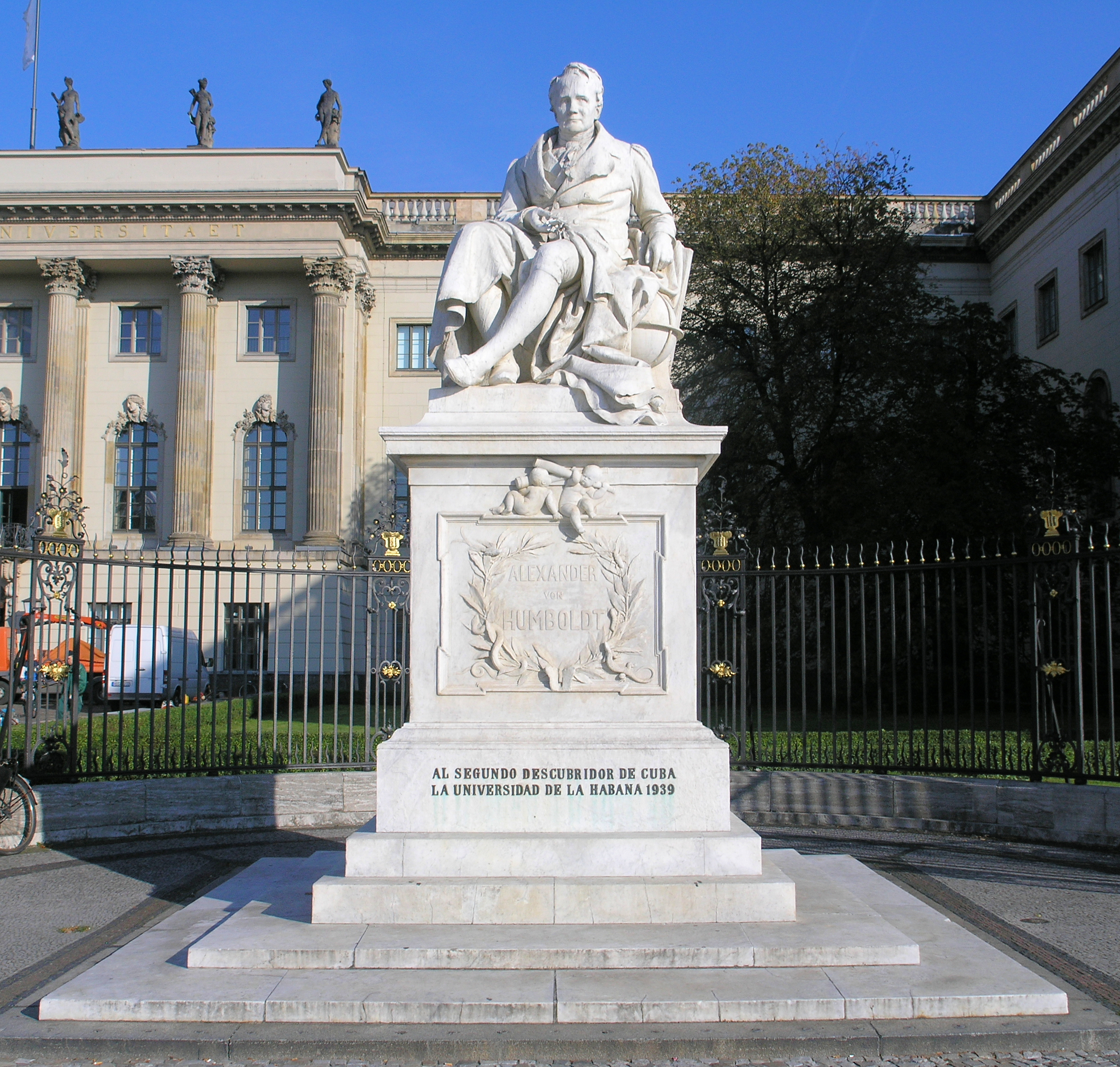
Alexander von Humboldt Memorial in Berlin, Unter den Linden

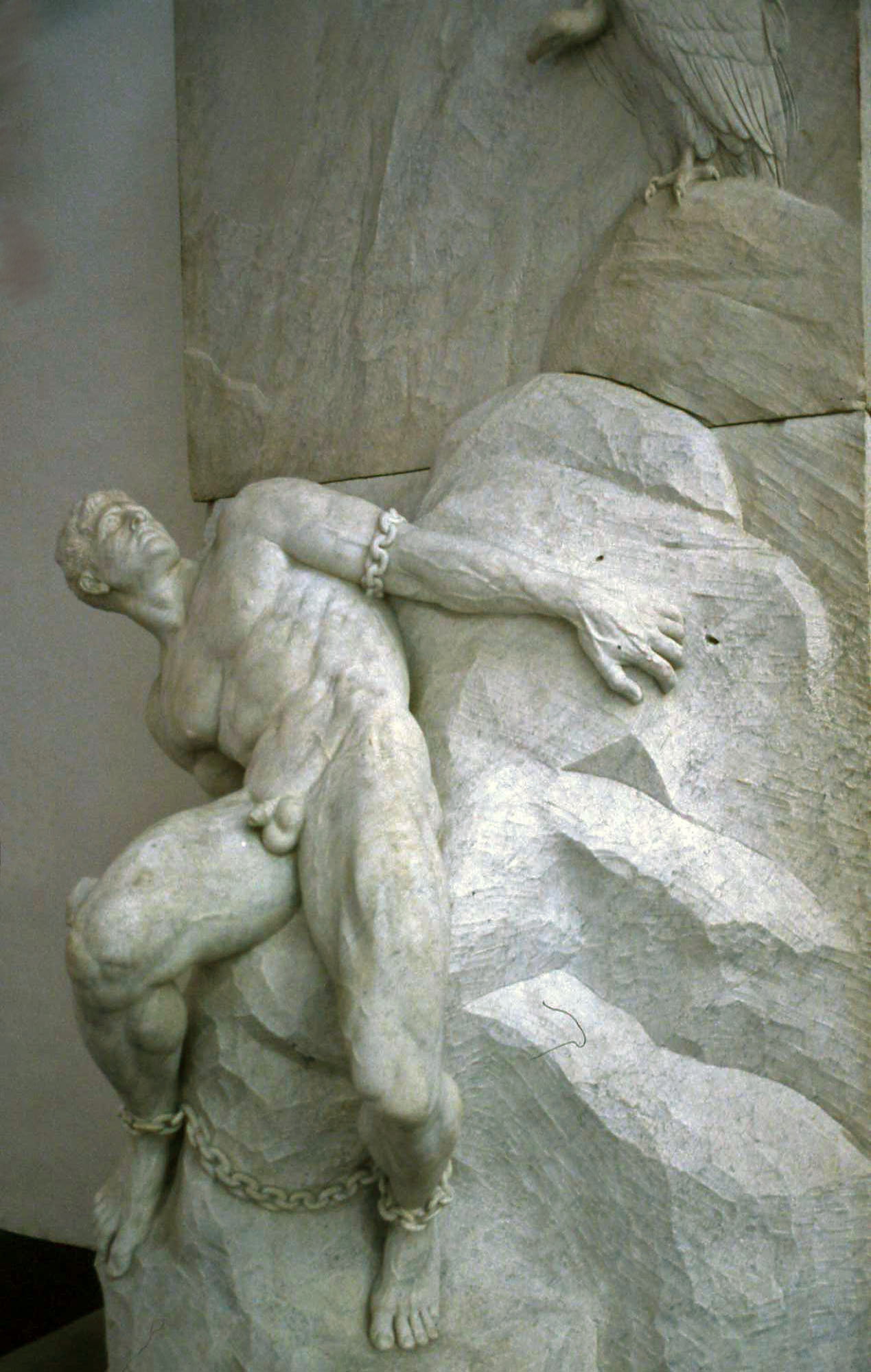
Prometheus

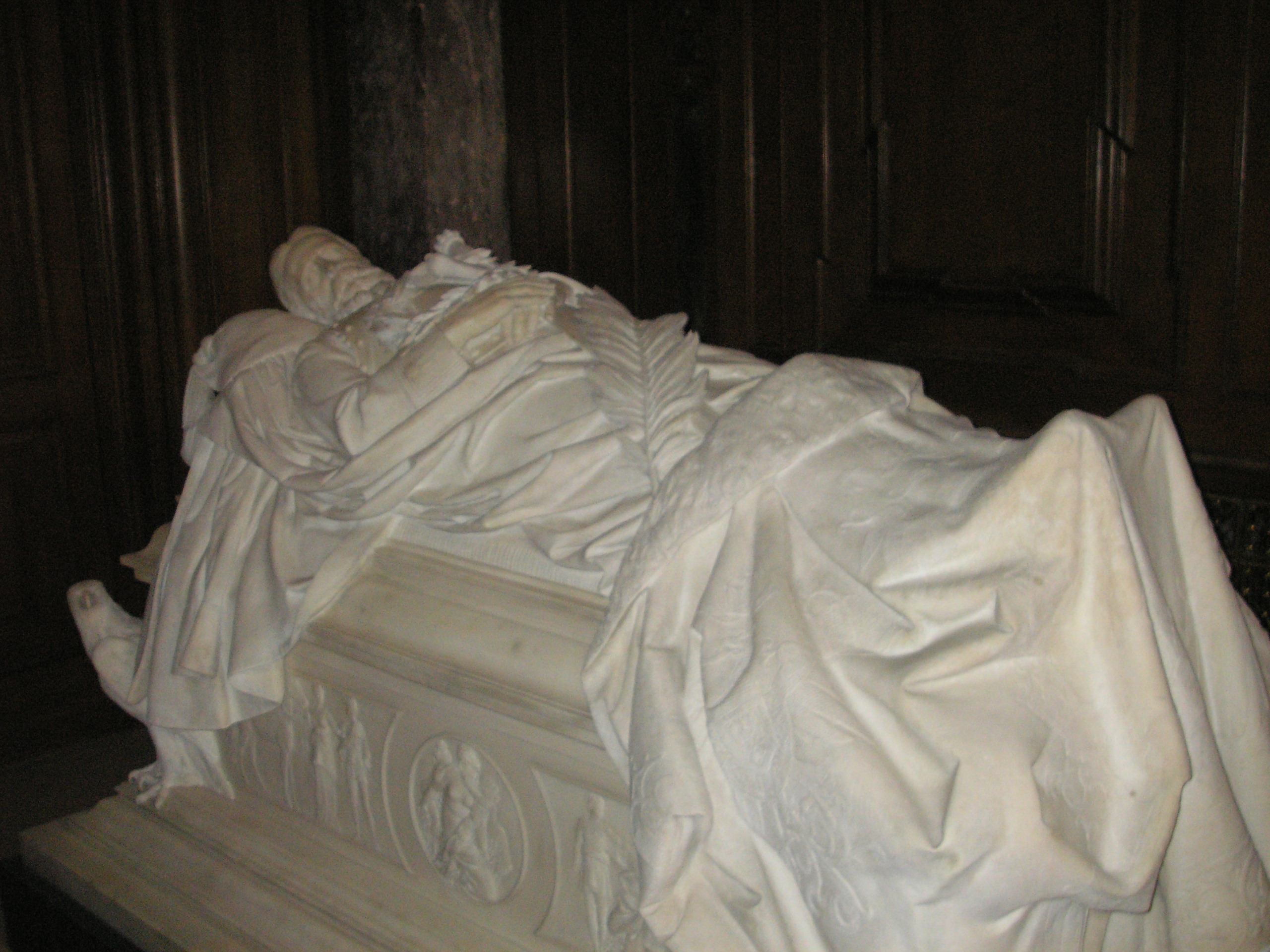
Cenotaph of Frederick III, German Emperor. Located in the Berliner Dom.

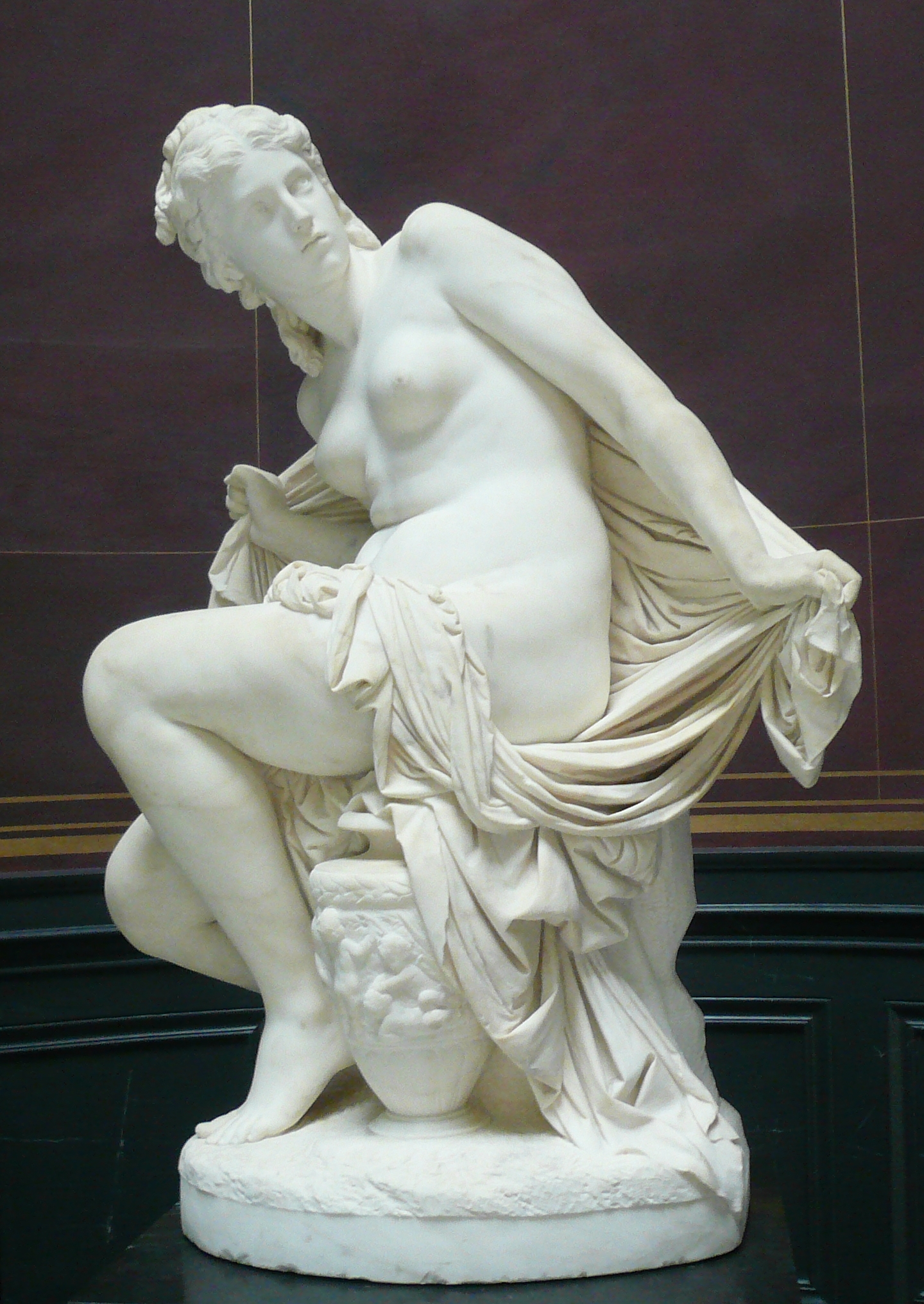
Susanna. 1869-72

== See also ==
- Centaur and Nymph
- Mercury and Psyche
