= Raid (1947 film) =

1947 film

- Directed by: Werner Klingler
- Written by: Harald G. Petersson
- Starring: Paul Bildt; Agathe Poschmann; Claus Holm
- Cinematography: Friedl Behn-Grund; Eugen Klagemann
- Edited by: Fritz Stapenhorst
- Music by: Werner Eisbrenner
- Production company: DEFA
- Distributed by: Progress Film; Sovexport Film
- Release date: 2 May 1947
- Running time: 90 minutes
- Country: Germany
- Language: German

Raid (German: Razzia) is a 1947 German crime film directed by Werner Klingler and starring Paul Bildt, Agathe Poschmann, and Claus Holm. It was made as a cautionary tale about the black market in postwar Berlin.

It was made in the Soviet Zone, which would later become East Germany. It was produced by the state-controlled DEFA and shot at the Johannisthal Studios and on location around Berlin. The film's sets were designed by the art directors Otto Hunte and Bruno Monden.

The picture sold more than 8,090,000 tickets.

== Plot ==
The film takes place in Berlin, in the direct aftermath of Germany's defeat in the Second World War.

The black market is rife in the ruined city. Chief Inspector Friedrich Naumann (Paul Bildt) organizes a raid on the "Ali Baba Club", the suspected center of a black market gang, but the raid fails due to the gang having an informer in the police ranks. Later, Naumann investigates alone, discovers a secret tunnel in the club, and gets murdered.

The plot then thickens around the complicated relationships between Goll (Harry Frank) - club owner and gang boss; the singer Yvonne (Nina Kosta), Goll's employee and accomplice; Heinz Becker, Naumann's colleague who had been blackmailed into acting as an informant; and Paul Naumann (Friedhelm von Petersson), the inspector's son, a recently returned prisoner of war who works as a driver in Goll's drug pushing ring until realizing that it was Goll who murdered his father.

In the cataclysmic conclusion, the police carry out another raid, a successful one this time, round up members of the gang and undo Goll's dark machinations.

At the time, Berlin was under complete four-power occupation, and the rival German Democratic Republic and German Federal Republic had not yet been set up. In this film, the situation of occupation is pushed to the background, with all characters, positive and negative, being Germans and the conflict in the film being between German police and German criminals.

== Cast ==
- Paul Bildt as Kriminalkommissar Friedrich Naumann
- Elly Burgmer as Auguste Naumann
- Agathe Poschmann as Anna Naumann
- Friedhelm von Petersson as Paul Naumann
- Nina Konsta as Yvonne
- Claus Holm as Karl Lorenz, Kriminal-Anwärter
- Hans Leibelt as Hugo Lembke, Kriminalrat
- Heinz Welzel as Heinz Becker, Kriminal-Anwärter
- Harry Frank as Goll, Besitzer der Alibaba-Bar
- Arno Paulsen as Franz Mierisch, Spediteur
- Walter Gross as Der flotte Willy
- Undine von Medvey as Akkordeonistin
- Martha Hübner as Frau Werner
- Otto Matthies as Herr Vogel
- Erwin Biegel as Köppke

== Bibliography ==
- Davidson, John; Hake, Sabine (2009). Framing the Fifties: Cinema in a Divided Germany. New York: Berghahn Books. ISBN 978-1-84545-536-1.
- Hake, Sabine (2002). German National Cinema. London: Routledge. ISBN 978-0-415-08901-2.
