= Mercury and Psyche =

Sculpture in Berlin, Germany

- Merkur und Psyche (German)
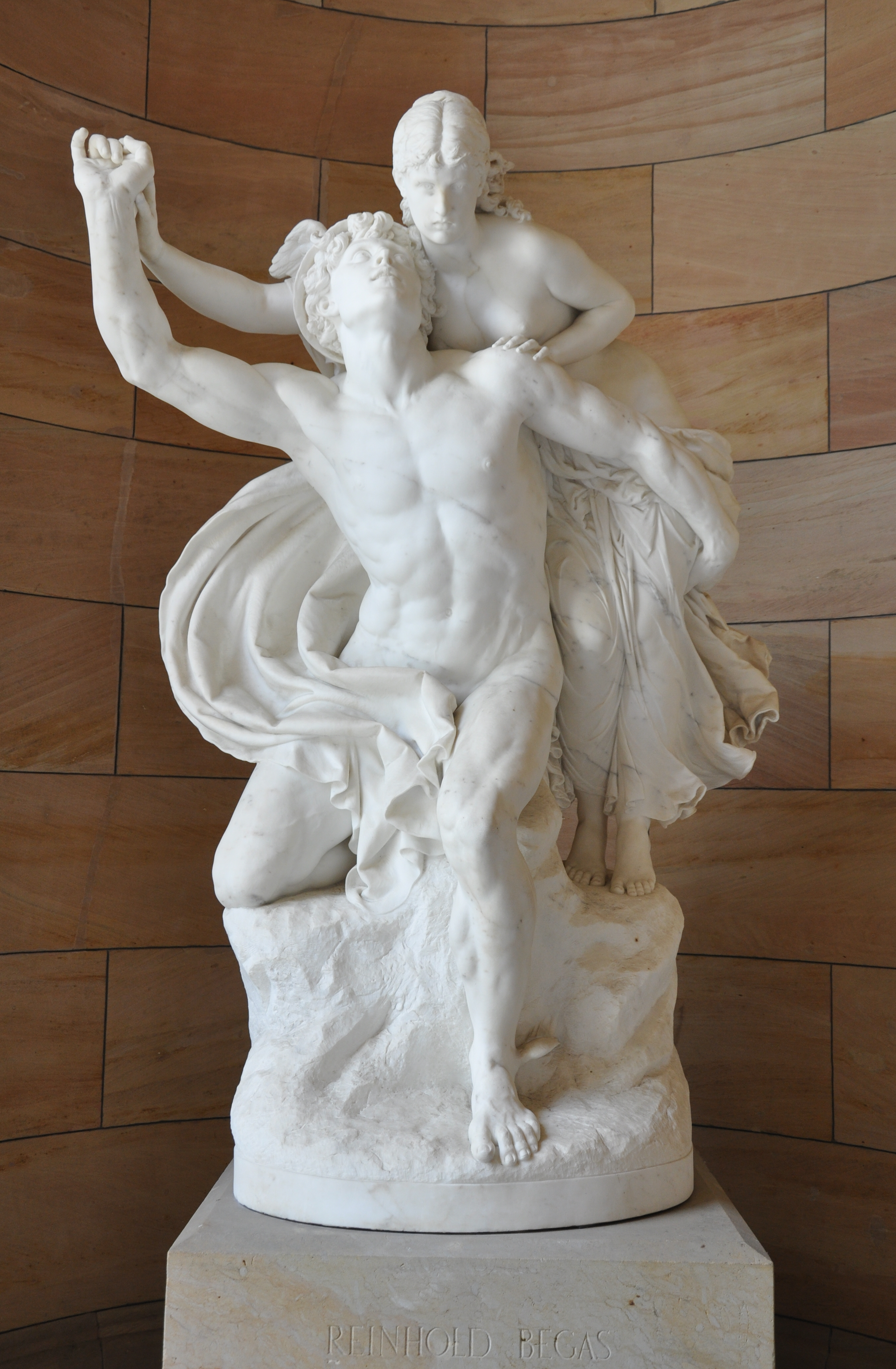
- The sculpture in 2012
- Artist: Reinhold Begas
- Year: 1870
- Type: Sculpture
- Medium: Marble
- Location: Berlin, Germany

Mercury and Psyche (German: Merkur und Psyche) is a marble sculpture by German artist Reinhold Begas, from 18670-1878. It is held in the collection of the Alte Nationalgalerie, in Berlin.
