= Centaur and Nymph =

Sculpture in Berlin, Germany

- Kentaur und Nymphe (German)
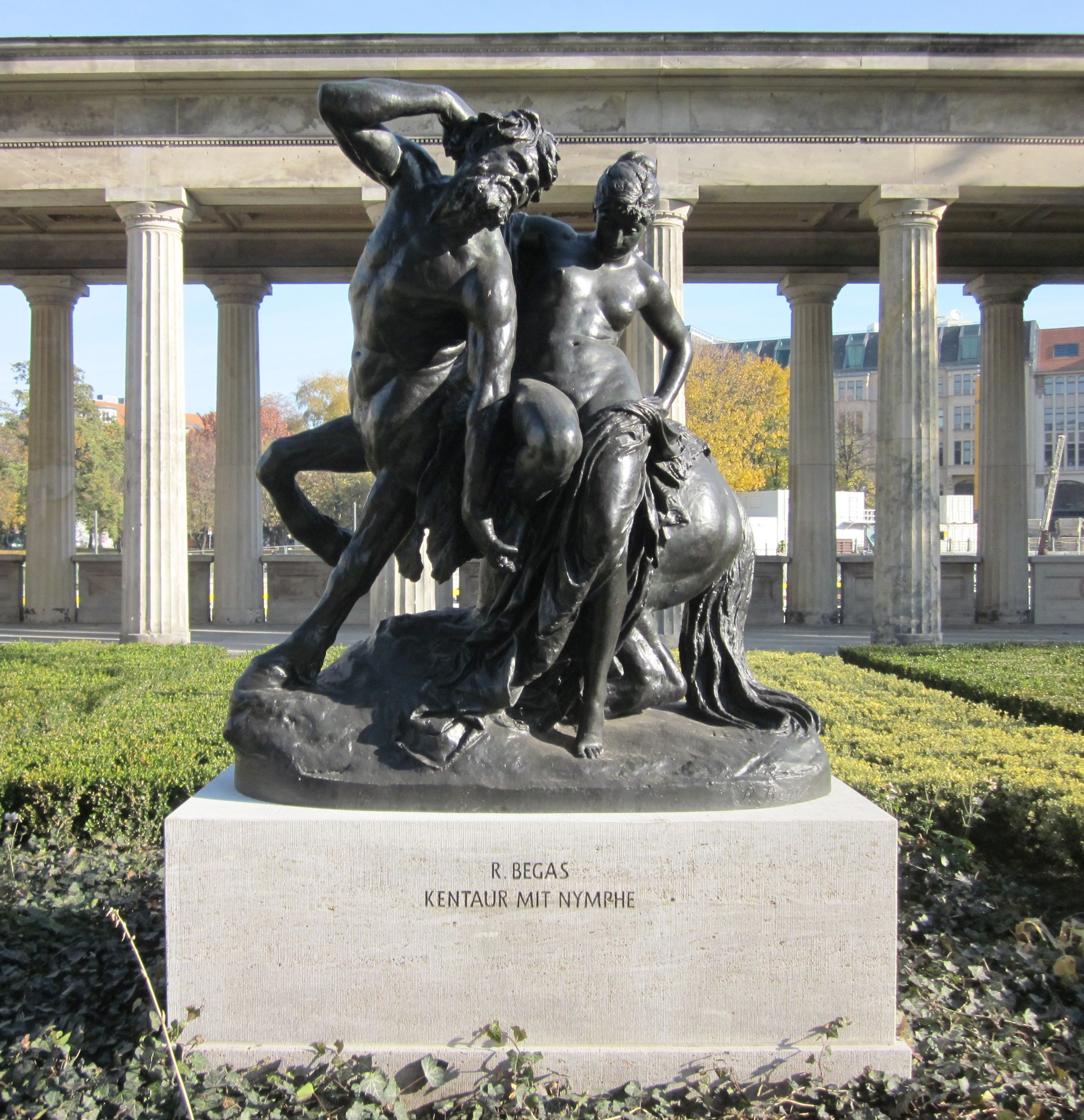
- The sculpture in 2010
- Artist: Reinhold Begas
- Year: 1888
- Type: Sculpture
- Medium: Bronze
- Location: Berlin

Centaur and Nymph (German: Kentaur und Nymphe) is a bronze sculpture by German artist Reinhold Begas, from 1888. It is installed in the Kolonnadenhof outside the Alte Nationalgalerie, in Berlin.

== See also ==
- 1888 in art
