= Hans Lohmeyer =

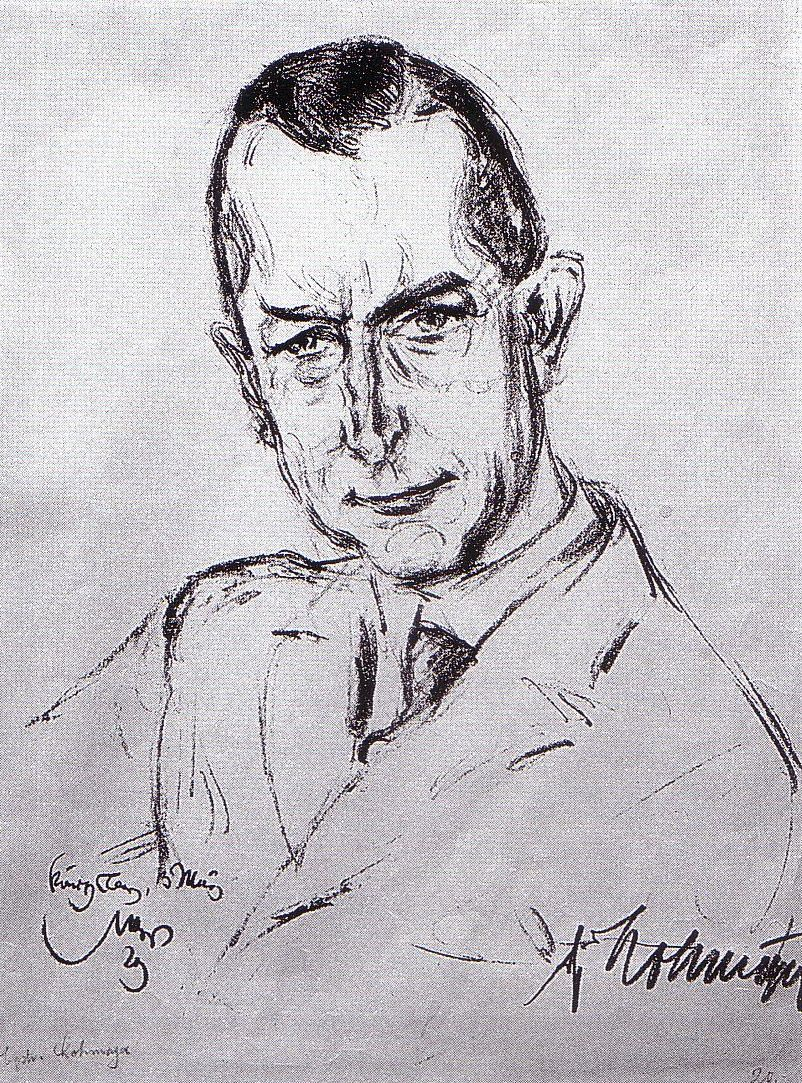
Lohmeyer in 1930, drawing by Emil Stumpp

Hans Lohmeyer (23 June 1881 in Thorn – 28 February 1968 in Berlin) was a German jurist, Lord Mayor of Königsberg and the husband of Gerda Müller

== Life ==
By the time the war ended he had already become involved with the Evangelical Church in Königsberg. Following a period of ethnic cleansing Königsberg was no longer a German city, however. Within postwar Germany Lohmeyer settled in what had become the Soviet occupation zone and became a synod member of the Evangelical Church in Berlin, Brandenburg and Silesian Upper Lusatia. He also belonged to the so-called Prussian Union of churches. In 1951 he co-founded the "Association for Communal Studies" ("Verein für Kommunalwissenschaften"), becoming its chairman in 1963.

He is buried in Berlin.

== Selected works ==
- Zentralismus oder Selbstverwaltung. Ein Beitrag zur Verfassungs- und Verwaltungsreform. Berlin: Carl Heymanns Verlag, Berlin 1928, IV, 87 S.
- Die Politik des Zweiten Reiches 1870–1918. 2 Bände. Berlin: Neff, Band 1: 1939, 555 S.; Band 2: 1939, 578 S.
- Die städtischen Betriebe. Königsberg 1924
- Rückblick auf meine Amtszeit, 1957
- Meine Königsberger Jahre, 1961

== Literature ==
- Bauwelt , vol 2/1925, p. 28
- Helge Dvorak: Biographisches Lexikon der Deutschen Burschenschaft vol. I Politiker, Teilband 3: I–L. Heidelberg 1999, S. 309–311.
- Ludwig Luckemeyer (1987). "Lohmeyer, Hans". Neue Deutsche Biographie (in German). Vol. 15. Berlin: Duncker & Humblot. p. 133. (full text online).
- Eckert Vogel: Dem Königsberger Oberbürgermeister Dr. Hans Lohmeyer zum Gedächtnis. Königsberger Bürgerbrief 65 (2005), p. 59 f
- Hans Lohmeyer Munzinger archive 37/1956 of 3 September 1956
