= Gendarmenmarkt =

Square in Berlin, Germany

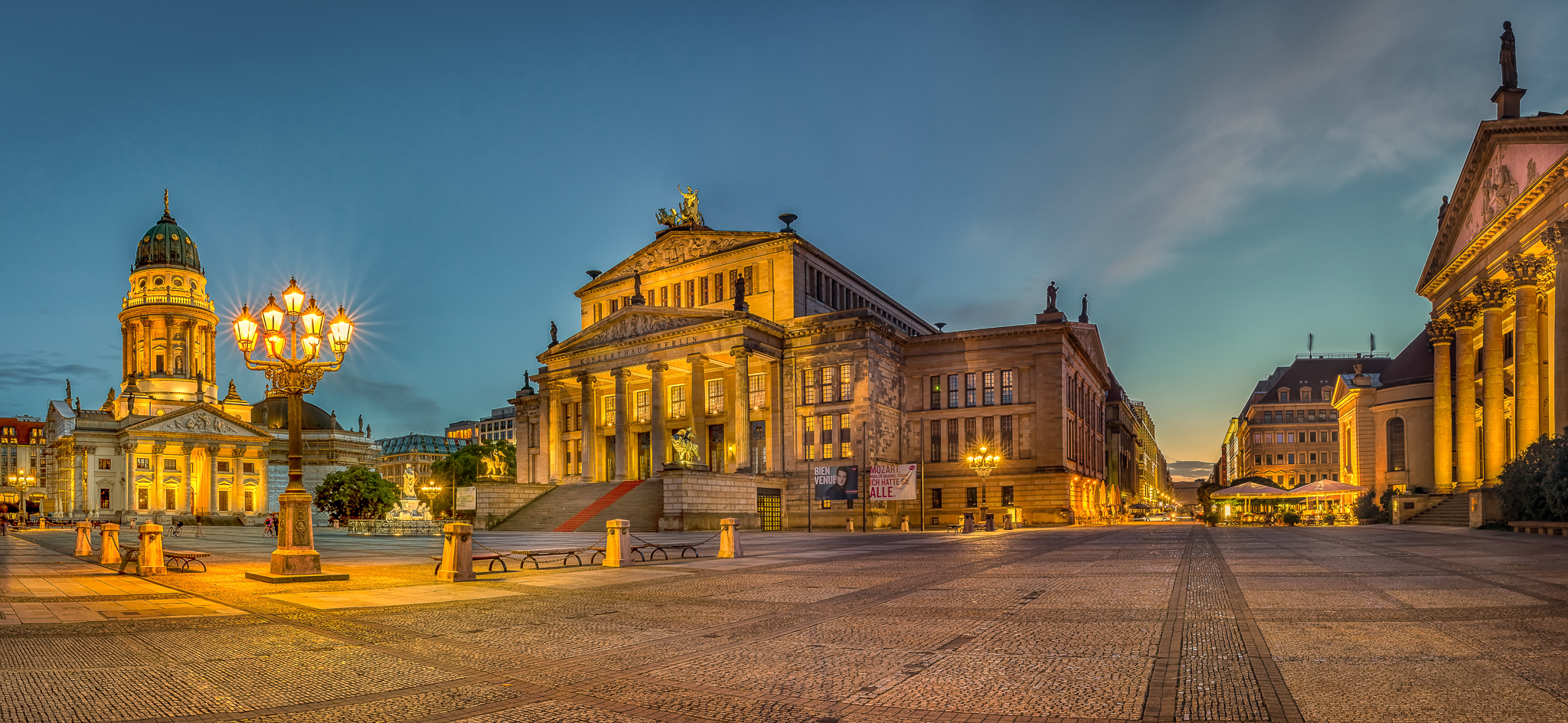
- Gendarmenmarkt at night
- Interactive map of Gendarmenmarkt
- Former names: Whole square: Lindenmarkt; (17th century); Parts of the square: Friedrichstädter Markt; (c. 1700–1786); Mittelmarkt; (c. 1700–1786); Whole square: Neuer Markt; (1786–1799); Part of the square: Schillerplatz; (1871–1936); Whole square: Platz der Akademie; (1950–1991)
- Namesake: Gendarmen
- Type: Public square
- Location: Berlin, Germany
- Quarter: Mitte
- Nearest metro station: Stadtmitte; Hausvogteiplatz
- Coordinates: 52°30′49″N 13°23′34″E
- Major junctions: Charlottenstraße; Französische Straße; Jägerstraße; Taubenstraße; Mohrenstraße; Markgrafenstraße

Construction
- Inauguration: Generally: c. 1700; Current name: 1799 and 1 December 1991

The Gendarmenmarkt (German for 'Men-at-arms market') is a square in Berlin and the site of an architectural ensemble that includes the Berlin concert hall, along with the French and German Churches. In the centre of the square stands a monumental statue of poet Friedrich Schiller. The square was created by Johann Arnold Nering at the end of the seventeenth century as the Linden-Markt and reconstructed by Georg Christian Unger in 1773. The Gendarmenmarkt is named after a Prussian cuirassier regiment called the Gendarmen, which had stables at the square until 1773.

During World War II, most of the buildings were badly damaged or destroyed. They have all been restored.

== Origins ==
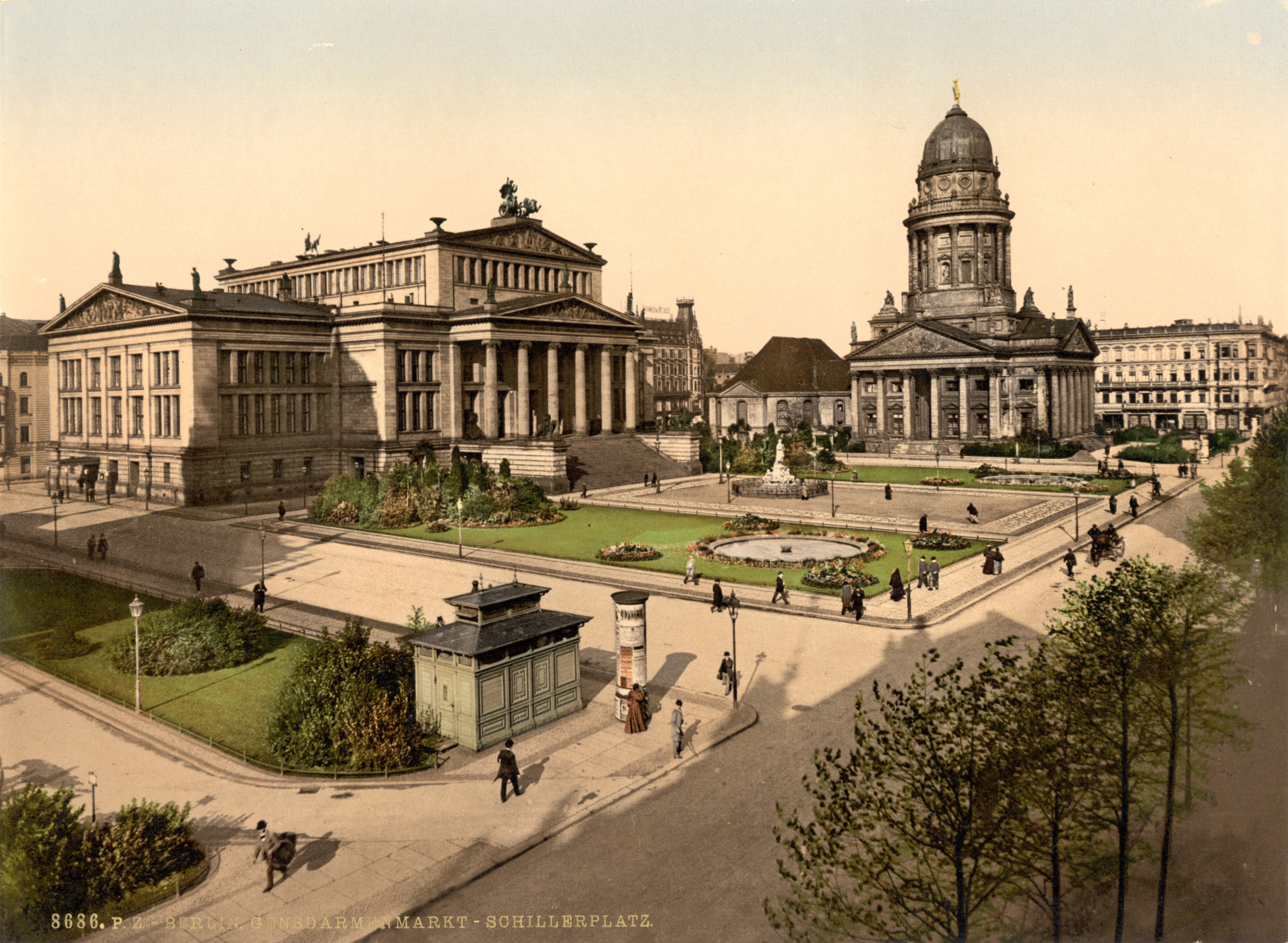
Gendarmenmarkt around 1900

The square was originally built in 1688. It was a marketplace and part of the city's Western expansion of Friedrichstadt, one of Berlin's emerging quarters.

== Französischer Dom ==
The French Cathedral (in German: Französischer Dom, where Dom refers to the "dome" and not to a cathedral. Neither the French nor the German Church was ever the seat of a bishop. The terminology is a relic of francophone Frederick the Great, who was instrumental in enhancing the Gendarmenmarkt) is the older of the two churches and was built by the Huguenot community between 1701 and 1705. It was modelled after the destroyed Huguenot church in Charenton-Saint-Maurice, France. The tower and porticoes, designed by Carl von Gontard, were added to the building in 1785. The French Church has a viewing platform, a restaurant and a Huguenot museum.

== Deutscher Dom ==
The German Cathedral (in German: Deutscher Dom) is located to the south of the Gendarmenmarkt. It has a pentagonal structure and was designed by Martin Grünberg and built in 1708 by Giovanni Simonetti. This church belonged to the Lutheran community. It too was modified in 1785 by Carl von Gontard, who built the domed tower. The German Church was completely destroyed by fire in 1945, during World War II. After German reunification it was rebuilt, finished in 1993 and re-opened in 1996 as a museum of German history.

== Konzerthaus ==
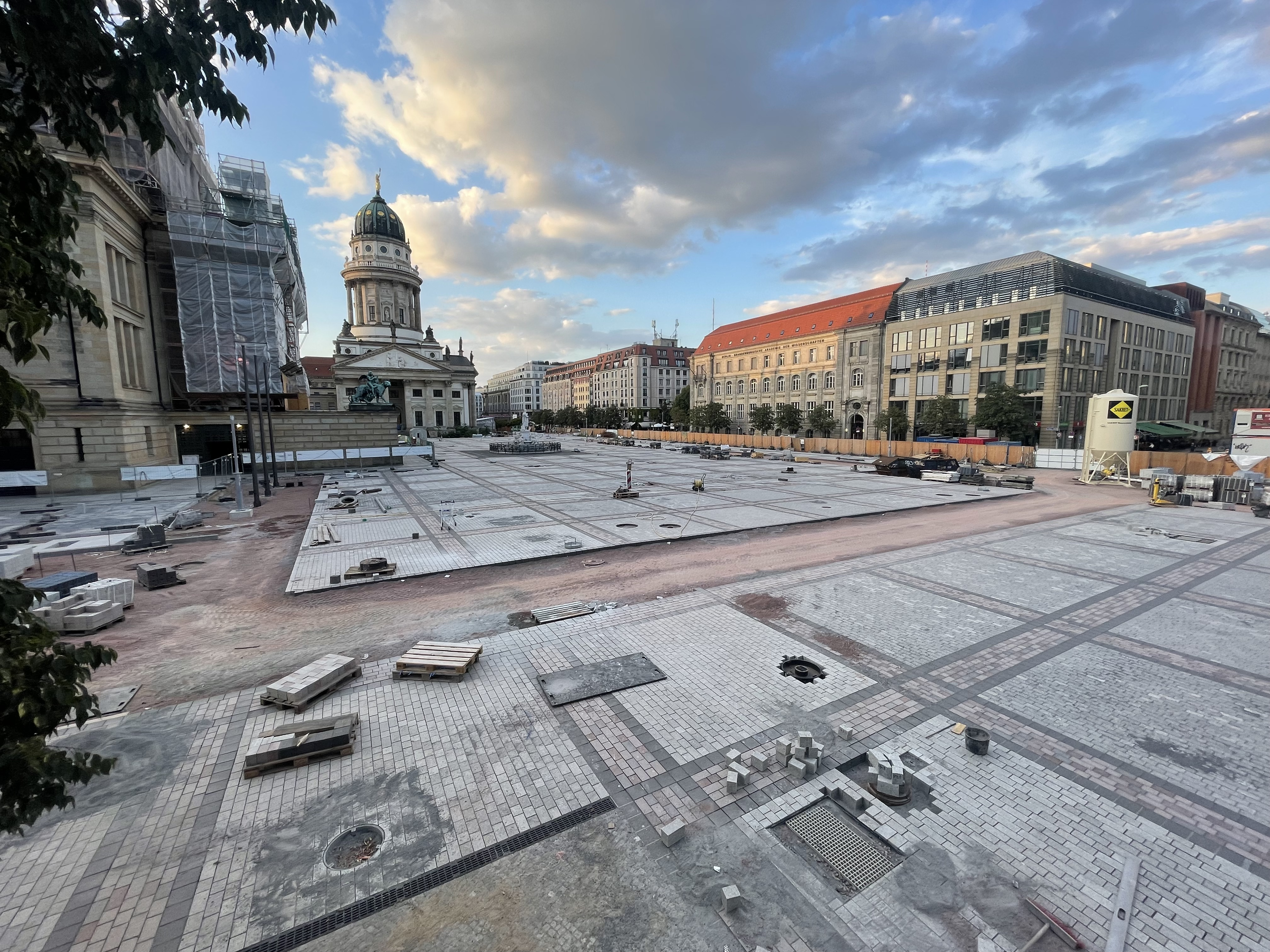
Gendarmenmarkt reconstruction in August 2024

The Konzerthaus Berlin is the most recent building on the Gendarmenmarkt. It was built by Karl Friedrich Schinkel in 1821 as the Schauspielhaus. It was based on the ruins of the National Theatre, which had been destroyed by fire in 1817. Parts of the building contain columns and some outside walls from the destroyed building. Like the other buildings on the square, it was also badly damaged during World War II. The reconstruction, finished in 1984, turned the theatre into a concert hall. Today, it is the home of the Konzerthausorchester Berlin.

The Gendarmenmarkt hosts one of Berlin's most popular Christmas markets.

== Panorama ==
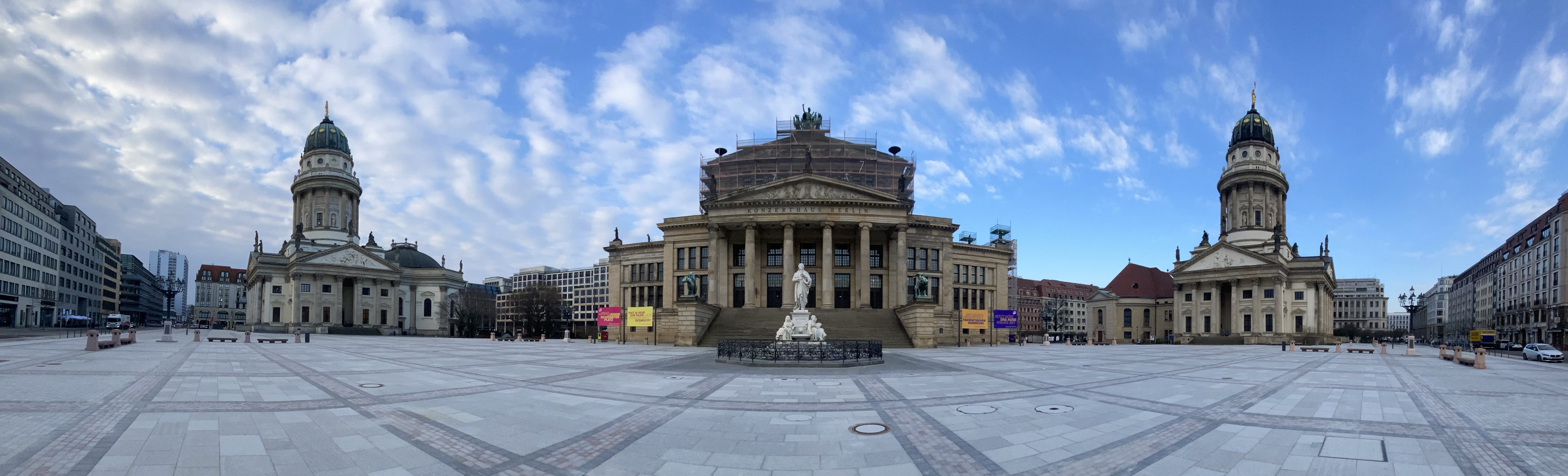
Panorama of the Gendarmenmarkt

== See also ==
- Preussische Staatsbank
