= Konzerthaus Berlin =

Concert hall in Berlin, Germany

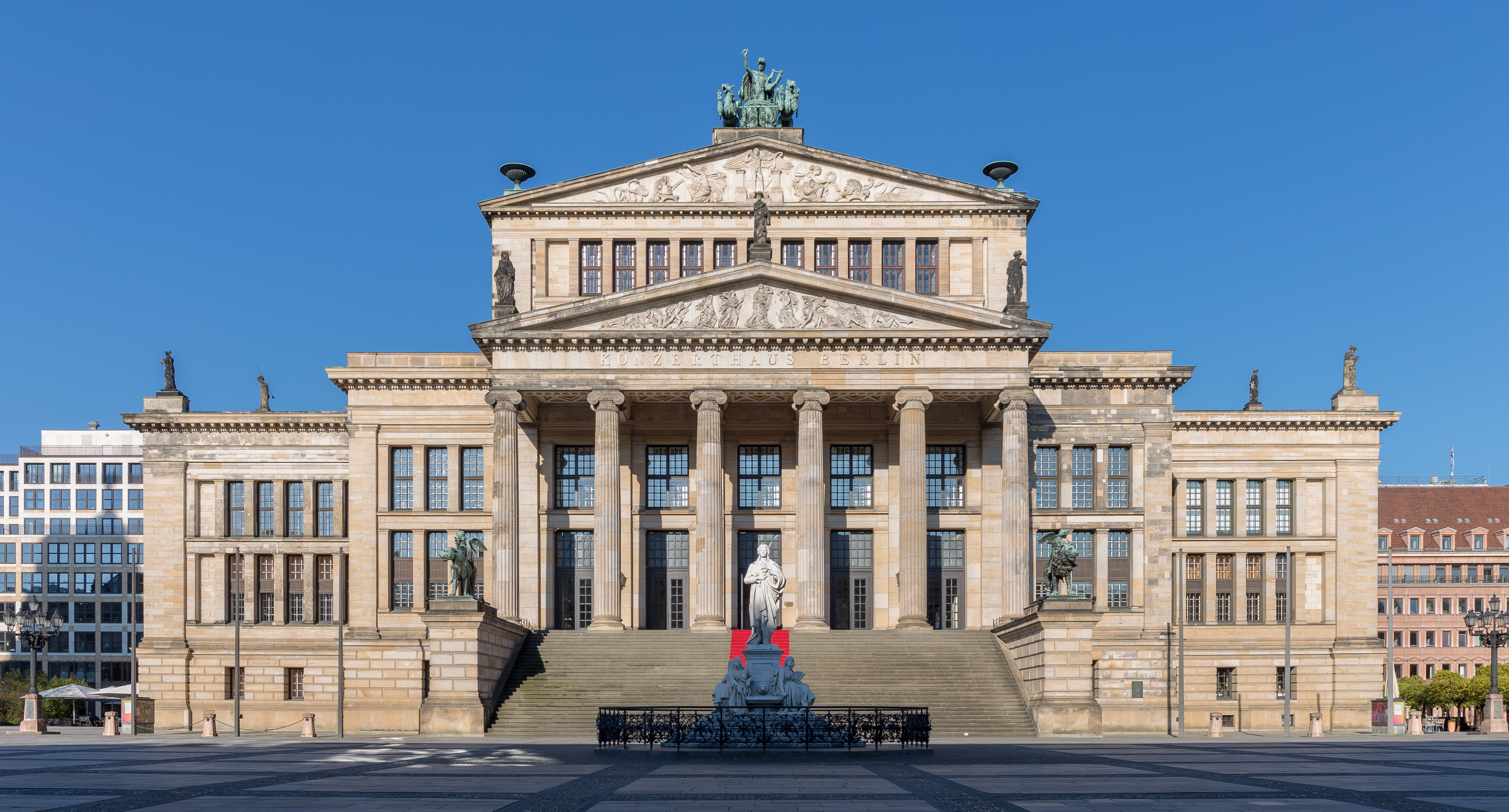
- Konzerthaus in 2015
- Interactive map of Konzerthaus Berlin
- Former names: Königliches Schauspielhaus; Theater am Gendarmenmarkt; Komödie
- Location: Gendarmenmarkt, Berlin, Germany
- Coordinates: 52°30′49″N 13°23′32″E

Construction
- Opened: 1821
- Rebuilt: 1977
- Architect: Karl Friedrich Schinkel

Website
- en.konzerthaus.de

The Konzerthaus Berlin is a concert hall in Berlin, the home of the Konzerthausorchester Berlin. Situated on the Gendarmenmarkt square in the central Mitte district of the city, it was originally built as a theater. It initially operated from 1818 to 1821 under the name of the Schauspielhaus Berlin, then as the Theater am Gendarmenmarkt and Komödie. It became a concert hall after the Second World War, and its name changed to its present one in 1994.

The Konzerthausorchester Berlin is the resident orchestra of the Konzerthaus Berlin. The concert hall also hosts Young Euro Classic every summer, an international festival of youth orchestras.

== History ==
=== National-Theater (1802–1817) ===
The building's predecessor, the National-Theater in the Friedrichstadt suburb, was destroyed by fire in 1817. It had been designed by Carl Gotthard Langhans, and was inaugurated on 1 January 1802.

=== Königliches Schauspielhaus (1817–1870) ===
The new hall was designed by Karl Friedrich Schinkel between 1818 and 1821. The new Königliches Schauspielhaus was inaugurated on 18 June 1821 with the acclaimed premiere of Carl Maria von Weber's opera Der Freischütz. Other works that have premiered at this theater include Undine by E. T. A. Hoffmann in 1816. During the 1848 Revolution its main auditorium housed the Prussian National Assembly for several weeks in September, with the Gendarmenmarkt a major arena of political events.

=== Preußisches Staatstheater (1870–1944) ===
Notable premieres during this period included Penthesilea by Heinrich von Kleist in 1876, and The Assumption of Hannele by Gerhart Hauptmann in 1893.

After World War I the Schauspielhaus reopened under the name of Preußisches Staatstheater Berlin in October 1919. Under the direction of noted German Expressionist producer and director Leopold Jessner, it soon became one of the leading theaters of the Weimar Republic, a tradition ambivalently continued by his successor Gustaf Gründgens after the Nazi takeover in 1933. Gründgens directed a famous staging of Goethe's Faust and the premiere of Gerhart Hauptmann's tragedy Iphigenie in Delphi in 1941.

=== After World War II ===
Severely damaged by Allied bombing and the Battle of Berlin, the building was rebuilt from 1977 onwards and reopened as the concert hall of the Berliner Sinfonie-Orchester in 1984 with a gala concert. The exterior, including many of the sculptures of composers by Christian Friedrich Tieck and Balthasar Jacob Rathgeber, is a faithful reconstruction of Schinkel's designs, while the interior was adapted in a Neoclassical style meeting the conditions of the altered use. The great hall is equipped with a notable four-manual pipe organ built by Jehmlich Orgelbau Dresden in 1984. The organ has four manuals and pedal, 74 stops and 5,811 pipes. In 1994 the venue was renamed the "Konzerthaus Berlin".

As of 2004, the hall's acoustics were considered to be among the five best concert venues in the world for music and/or opera.

== Gallery ==
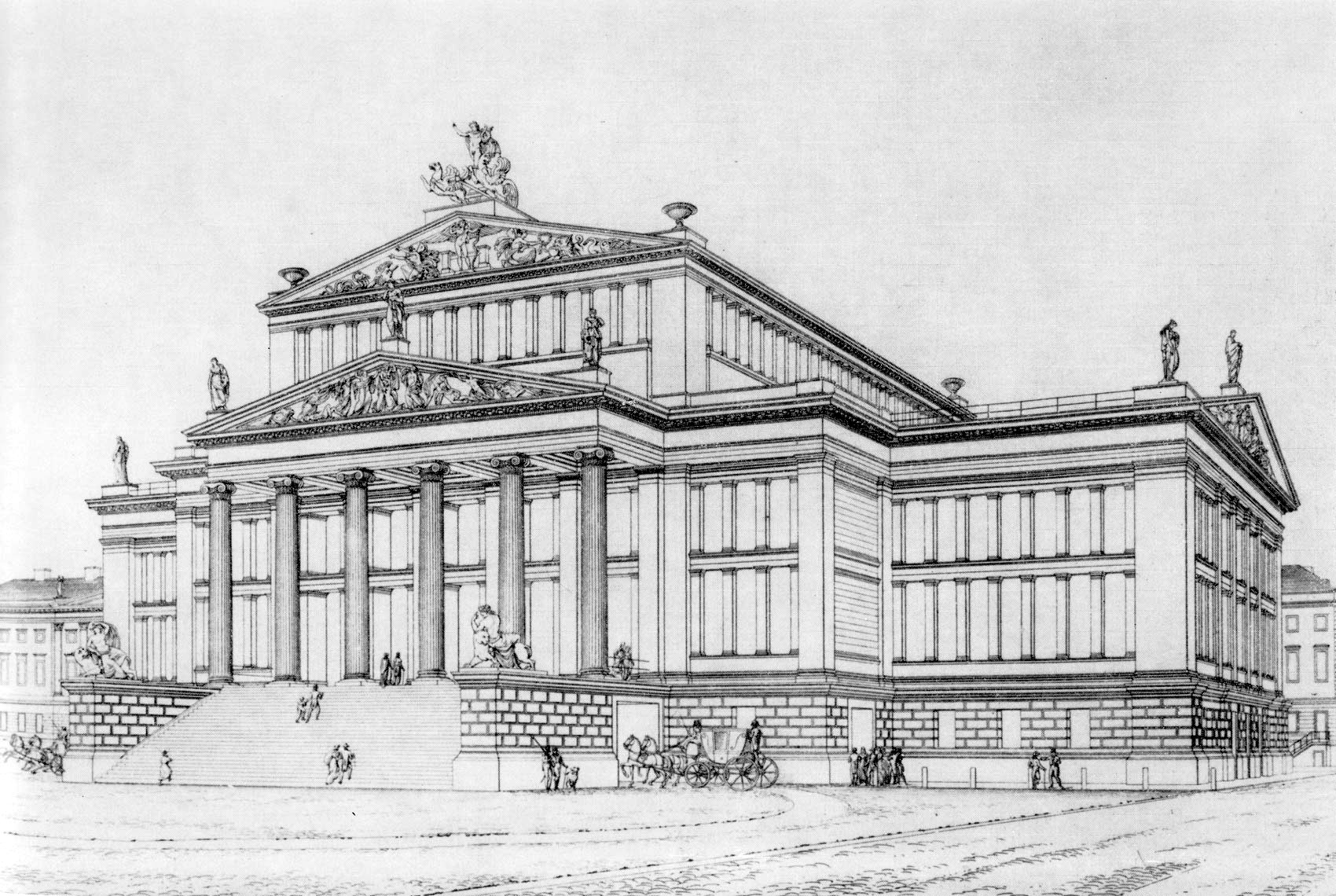
Karl Friedrich Schinkel's design, copper engraving, about 1830

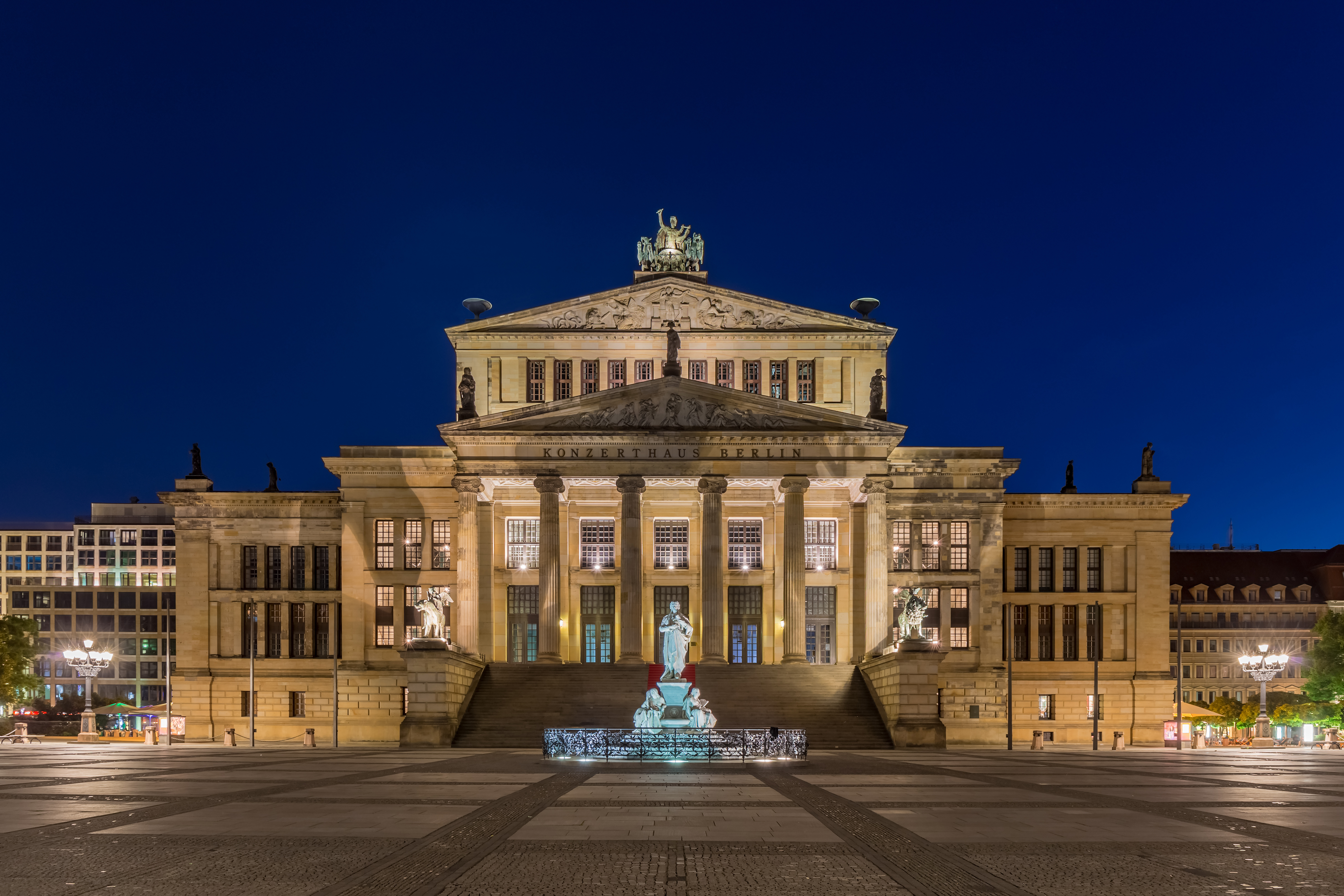
Konzerthaus Berlin at night (2015)

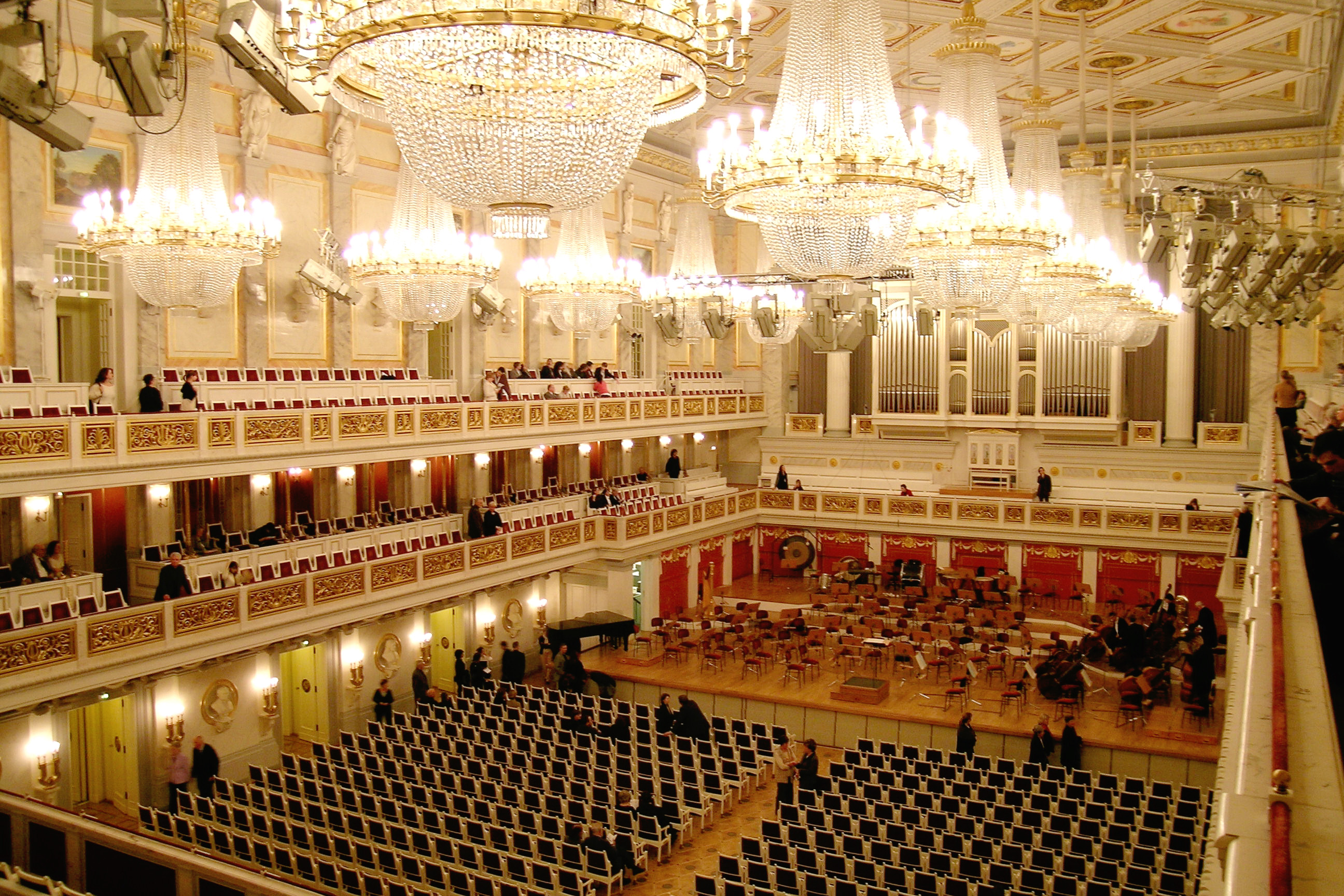
Interior in 2005

== Composers in residence ==
- 2026–2027 Unsuk Chin

== Bibliography ==
- Felix Pestemer: Alles bleibt anders : das Konzerthaus Berlin und seine Geschichte(n), avant-verlag (Verlag), Berlin 2021, ISBN 978-3-96445-046-3, OCLC 1250253904.
