= Joachim Werzlau =

German composer (1913–2001)

- Born: 5 August 1913; Leipzig, Germany
- Died: 23 October 2001 (aged 88); Berlin, Germany
- Occupations: Pianist; Composer; Radio consultant; Culture administrator
- Organizations: DEFA
- Known for: Film scores
- Awards: National Prize of the GDR

Joachim Werzlau (5 August 1913 – 23 October 2001) was a German pianist, radio consultant and composer. He belonged to the first generation of composers in the GDR, where he was also active in organisations and politics. As a pianist, he played for the theatre, for Mary Wigman's dance school, and a kabarett, among others. He composed popular songs, music for audio plays, film scores, incidental music, and three operas. With films such as Nackt unter Wölfen (Naked Among Wolves) and Jakob der Lügner (Jacob the Liar), he was the most popular film composer of the GDR of his time.

== Early years ==
Born in Leipzig the son of an orchestra musician, Werzlau tried first compositions at age twelve. His father taught him violin and piano. Since the family's economic situation prevented him from studying music, Werzlau began as an apprentice piano maker at the Blüthner company in his home town. He made money as a pianist as well as a composer at various cultural institutions in Leipzig. At age 22, he was offered the prospect of admission to study music at the University of Music and Theatre Leipzig, which he soon lost because of close contacts with left-wing artists. From 1941 to 1942 he performed military service, but then was forced to work in a factory until the end of the war.

== After World War II ==
After the end of the Nazi regime in Germany, Werzlau was active in the Antifa-Block and became a member of the Cultural Association of the GDR. He joined the SED party in 1946. He composed incidental music for Theater Leipzig and music for radio dramas for the Leipzig radio station. In addition, Werzlau was répétiteur for the Mary Wigman School, and became director of the musical-literary kabarett Die Rampe in Leipzig.

Werzlau wrote his probably most popular song, Weil wir jung sind, ist die Welt so schön (Because we are young, the world is so beautiful) to lyrics by Gerhard Wolfram. Between 1949 and 1952, he was a music consultant (Musikreferent) at Berlin Radio, for which he also worked as a composer and program planner. During this time he also began composing songs for children, pioneers, youth and other mass groups, suitable to socialist holidays. This made him very popular in the GDR. He wrote film scores for DEFA from 1953, and became one of the influential film composers of the GDR. In the 1960 Fünf Patronenhülsen, he used recorder, guitar, trumpet and drums instead of an orchestra.

Werzlau was a founding member of the East German Verband der Komponisten und Musikwissenschaftler der DDR, an association of composers and musicologists, in 1951, and working freelance from then on. He served as chairman of the association's Berlin District from 1960 to 1964. From 1967 to 1981, he was a member of the East Berlin City Council, and became a member of the Akademie der Künste der DDR in 1969. In 1977, Werzlau became a member of the board of the Composers' Association. From 1985, he was chairman of the advisory board of the AWA, an institution for the protection of performing and reproduction rights for music. In both 1967 and 1981, he was honoured with the National Prize of the GDR.

Werzlau wrote his first opera Regine in 1963, which was premiered at the Hans Otto Theater in Potsdam with moderate success. In 1976, his second opera was premiered at the Berlin Staatsoper Unter den Linden with great success: Meister Röckle, to a libretto by Günther Deicke. The plot is based on motifs from the children's book Meister Hans Röckle und Mister Flammfuß by Ilse and Vilmos Korn. The work was performed at several theatres in the GDR, including Weimar, Meiningen and Leipzig. In 1981, Meister Röckle was also performed in Moscow at the local music theatre for children by Natalia Saz. In the first half of the 1980s, Werzlau worked on his third opera, Zille Heinrich, about the popular Heinrich Zille.

Werzlau was married; the couple had a son, Friedemann. Werzlau died in Berlin at the age of 88.

== Works ==
Werzlau's compositions include:

- Unser Leben im Lied, cantata for soloists, choir and orchestra, text by B. Seeger, 1959
- Episoden, five orchestral pieces, 1962
- Hans Marchwitza, a symphonic portrait for large orchestra, 1971
- Der strenge Chronos, 13 songs after Soviet poems, 1977
- Partita for violin solo, 1978
- Fahnenmarsch für großes Blasorchester, 1979
- Sanssouci for orchestra, 1979
- Szenen for orchestra, 1979
- Erinnerungen an Heinrich Zille, four sketches for piano, 1984
- Zille Heinrich, opera, libretto by H. Kahlau, first version 1980–84, second version 1986–88
- Kartoffelkantate, cantata for soloists, choir and instruments, text by Maria Dresdner, 1986
- Kontra Lamento for orchestra, new version 1986
- Aktion Berlin for large wind orchestra, 1986

== Film scores ==
Werzlau's film scores include:

- 1950: Saure Wochen – frohe Feste
- 1953: Die Störenfriede
- 1953: Jacke wie Hose
- 1954: Das geheimnisvolle Wrack
- 1955: Der Teufel vom Mühlenberg
- 1955: Robert Mayer – der Arzt aus Heilbronn
- 1956: Genesung
- 1956: Das tapfere Schneiderlein
- 1957: Lissy
- 1957: Tinko
- 1957: Zwei Mütter
- 1957: Polonia-Express
- 1958: Sonnensucher
- 1959: Ein ungewöhnlicher Tag
- 1959: Eine alte Liebe
- 1960: Fünf Patronenhülsen
- 1960/2014: Sommerwege
- 1962: Königskinder
- 1963: Karbid und Sauerampfer
- 1963: Nackt unter Wölfen
- 1974: Jakob der Lügner

== Recording ==
- 1961: Bernhard Seeger: Unterm Wind der Jahre, radio play, directed by Theodor Popp, Rundfunk der DDR
