= The Punch Bowl (1959 film) =

Maibowle
- Directed by: Günter Reisch
- Written by: Marianne Libera, Gerhard Weise
- Starring: Erich Franz
- Cinematography: Otto Merz
- Edited by: Hildegard Conrad
- Music by: Helmut Nier
- Distributed by: Progress Film
- Release date: 4 December 1959
- Running time: 90 minutes
- Country: East Germany
- Language: German

Maibowle (May Wine; English-language title: The Punch Bowl) is an East German musical comedy film, released in 1959. It was directed by Günter Reisch.

== Plot ==
Wilhelm Lehmann is informed that he will receive the Order of the Banner of Labor on his sixty-fifth birthday, for being the best worker in the most successful chemical plant in the country. However, it is soon made clear that all his grown up children have other plans for the day, and none of them can arrive to honor their father and their mother Auguste. But, after a series of comical mistakes that lead to utter pandemonium, all the sons and daughters eventually appear to greet Wilhelm as he is awarded the Order. The whole family drinks the traditional May wine, as they have done in every year.

== Cast ==
- Erich Franz as Wilhelm Lehmann
- Albert Hetterle as Gustav Lehmann
- Erika Dunkelmann as Marion Lehmann
- Christel Bodenstein as Suse Lehmann
- Friedel Nowack as Auguste Lehmann
- Heinz Draehn as Franz Lehmann
- Ekkehard Schall as Günther Lehmann
- Stefan Lisewski as Paul Lehmann
- Horst Kube as Albert Lehmann
- Ernst-Georg Schwill as Knispel
- Fritz Diez as State Secretary Frisch
- Karla Runkehl as Rosa

== Production ==
The film was commissioned for the tenth anniversary of East Germany's independence, and the decision to begin the project was taken on the 5th Congress of the Socialist Unity Party, at July 1958. It was a musical comedy, one of the pictures which authors Mira and Antonín J. Liehm considered as an attempt by DEFA to balance the effects its heavily ideological works had on the public. Although it was light-hearted, director Günter Reisch emphasized the happiness experienced by the citizens in the socialist system and the importance of the chemical plants' development - one of them served as the setting for the plot. The director's decision was influenced by the response to his last film, the 1957 Trail in the Night, which was negatively received by the State Film Board due to a scene featuring rock-and-roll music.

== Reception ==
Maibowle had its premiere in East Berlin's Cinema Babylon on 5 October 1959, and its commercial release followed in December 4. The film was well received, and attracted a "fairly large audience". West Germany's Catholic Film Service noted that the picture "had a weak script, but its momentum and cabaret scenes compensate for it." In the same time, the comical character of the eccentric politician Frisch was criticized by the East German Film Board. The Liehms considered it as one of "the two smoothest" among the "poorly crafted, simple minded" East German comedies of the late 1950s, along its 1960 sequel New Year's Eve Punch. Ralf Schenk wrote that the film was an attempt to create comedy combined with "slogans praising the Socialist society and the qualities of chemical ingredients."
