= Aromatised wine =

Fortified wine flavoured with herbs, spices, fruit or other natural flavouring

Aromatised wine (spelled aromatized in American English) is a wine flavoured with aromatic herbs and spices. These are classified by their alcohol content and the flavourings and other ingredients used. The European Union defines three categories: 'aromatised wine', 'aromatised wine-based drink' and 'aromatised wine-product cocktail'. Drinks which have an alcohol content of 1.2% abv or less, cannot be labelled as containing wine.

== History ==
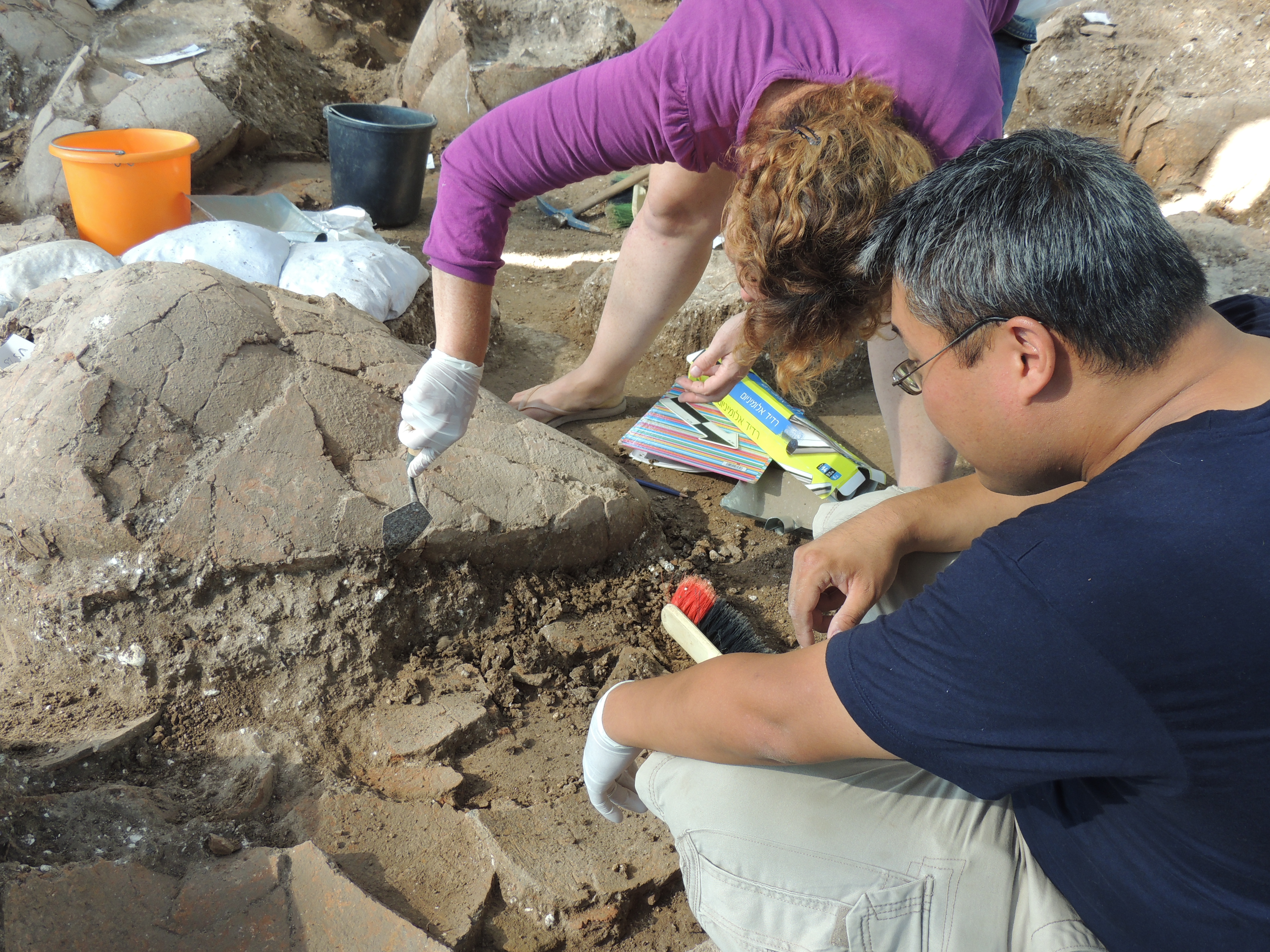
Bronze Age wine jars discovered at Tel Kabri, Israel, with residue evidence of additives such as mint, juniper, cedar oil, storax, cinnamon bark, and honey used to produce aromatised wine

Aromatised wine was produced in the ancient Near East using a variety of herbs, spices, and sweeteners. An early evidence of aromatised wine comes from Ancient Egypt, where wine jars from Abydos, dating to around 3150 BCE, contained residues suggesting the use of mint, coriander, sage, and thyme as flavoring agents. Wine lists from the city of Mari, Syria dating from the 18th century BCE refer to aromatic or sweetened wines. At Tel Kabri, a Middle Bronze Age Canaanite palace site in modern Israel, wine storage jars uncovered in a preserved cellar were analysed for residue, revealing the use of additives such mint, juniper, cedar oil, storax, cinnamon bark, and honey. The Hebrew Bible also makes reference to spiced wine, as seen in Song of Songs 8:2.

Multiple kinds of aromatic wine are mentioned in Talmudic literature (that is, Jewish rabbinic texts from the early centuries AD through late antiquity). Examples include Alontit, which was infused with balsam; Anomalin, a blend of wine, honey, and pepper (comparable to the Greek Oinomelon); and Inmernon, wine spiced with myrrh. Additional examples include Psynthiton, a wine scented with wormwood, and Kafrisin wine, which may derive its name from Cyprus, though it more likely refers to a wine spiced with capers.

== Types ==
An aromatised wine is a drink obtained from one or more of grapevine products, which must be at least 75% by volume of the finished drink. It may have added alcohol, colours, grape must, and it may be sweetened. Its actual alcohol strength must be at least 14.5% abv, and less than 22%. The majority of older brands come from France and Italy but there are now a range of small 'craft' producers around the world.

=== Vermouth ===
Vermouth is the most widely used aromatised wine due to its use in cocktails. Vermouth can be sweet or dry and red, white, pink or orange. It is traditionally flavoured with an infusion of herbs, peels and spices, which must include some member of the Artemisia (wormwood) family. Notable brands include Martini and Cinzano which are commonplace around the world, and Noilly Prat and Dolin of France, Carpano and Cocchi of Italy.

=== Bitter aromatised wine ===
These are categorised by the flavour that imparts the bitterness to the drink, usually either quinine or gentian root, or a mix of the two.

- Quinquina. Quinquina uses quinine from the cinchona bark as a main flavouring ingredient. Brands of this type of aromatised wine aperitif include Lillet, Dubonnet and Byrrh.
- Bitter vino. Gentian is the main bitter flavour, and the drink may be coloured either yellow or red with permitted colours.
- Americano. Americano uses a mix of quinine and gentian root as the main flavouring ingredient. The name comes from the French 'amer' meaning bitter. Brands of this type of aromatised wine aperitif include Cocchi Americano and Vergano Americano.

=== Egg-based aromatised wine ===
An 'egg-based aromatised wine' is one that is fortified, and has egg yolks added (minimum of 10g per litre), and a sugar content of more than 200g per litre. To qualify as 'cremovo', the drink must include a minimum of 80% of DOC Marsala wine. To qualify as 'cremovo zabaione', the drink must additionally have at least 60g egg yolks per litre.

=== Väkevä viiniglögi/Starkvinsglögg ===
A fortified aromatised wine whose characteristic flavour has been obtained from cloves and/or cinnamon.

== Aromatised wine-based drink ==
Aromatised wine-based drink has at least 50% grapevine product but no added alcohol (with some exceptions). It may have added colour, grape must, may have been sweetened. The actual alcohol is at least 4.5% abv and less than 14.5% by vol. The following are recognised as known, defined named drinks:

- Aromatised fortified wine-based drink.
  - White wine and dried grape distillate, flavoured exclusively with cardamom extract. Minimum 7% abv.
  - Red wine, flavoured exclusively from spices, ginseng, nuts, citrus fruit essences and aromatic herbs. Minimum 7% abv.
- Sangria. Wine, aromatised with natural citrus fruit flavours, which may include spices and carbon dioxide, and an alcohol content at least 4.5% and less than 12% abv.
  - Clarea. As Sangria but made with white wine.
  - Zurra. A sangria or clarea fortified with brandy or wine spirit, to at least 9% vol and less than 14% vol. It may also include pieces of fruit.
- Bitter soda. Carbon dioxide or carbonated water with 'bitter vino' (minimum 50% by volume)
- Kalte Ente (Cold Duck). Wine or semi-sparkling wine, mixed with sparkling wine and lemon flavours. The final mix must be at least 7% abv and contain at least 25% of the sparkling wine.
- Glühwein. Either red or white wine, served mulled (warmed), flavoured mainly with cinnamon and/or cloves. A minimum of 7% abv.
  - Viiniglögi / Vinglögg / Karštas vynas. A similar drink in Nordic countries and Estonia.
- Maiwein (May wine). Wine flavoured with Galium odoratum (sweet woodruff), with a minimum of 7% abv
  - Maitrank. As Maiwein, with the addition of flavouring from oranges or other fruits, and up to 5% sugar sweetening
- Pelin. Red or white wine infused with dried artemisia roots and flowers, and other herbs and fruits. Minimum of 8.5% abv.
- Aromatizovaný dezert.

== Aromatised wine-product cocktail ==
Drinks classified as 'aromatised wine-product cocktail' must have at least 50% grapevine product. It is not permitted to add alcohol or grape must, but they may have added colouring, and may have been sweetened. The alcohol content is more than 1.2% and less than 10%.
