= Besondere Kennzeichen: keine =

1956 film

- Directed by: Joachim Kunert
- Starring: Erika Müller-Fürstenau; Christoph Engel
- Release date: 8 March 1956
- Running time: 1h 26min
- Country: East Germany
- Language: German

Besondere Kennzeichen: keine is a 1956 German drama film directed by Joachim Kunert.

== Cast ==
- Erika Müller-Fürstenau - Gerda Krause
- Christoph Engel - Bernd
- Rolf Moebius - Werner Schneider
- Erich Mirek - Zimmermann
- Horst Naumann - Klaus
- Elfriede Garden - Gerdas Freundin Jutta
- Anneliese Grummt - Uschi
- Hans-Joachim Martens - Jürgen
- Magdalene von Nußbaum - Mutter Becker
- Gertrud Brendler - Fräulein Grethmann
- Waldemar Jacobi - Vater Becker
- Erika Dunkelmann - Hanna - Gerdas Arbeitskollegin
