= Maibowle =

Maibowle may refer to one of the following:

- May wine, a traditional German beverage, known also as Maibowle, among other names.
- The Punch Bowl, an East German film from 1959, the original German-language title of which is Maibowle.
