= Solange Leben in mir ist =

As Long as there is Life in Me
- DVD Cover
- Solange Leben in mir ist
- Directed by: Günter Reisch
- Written by: Hermann Herlinghaus; Günter Reisch; Michael Tschesno-Hell
- Starring: Horst Schulze; Lyudmila Kasyanova; Rita Krips
- Cinematography: Horst E. Brandt
- Edited by: Bärbel Weigl
- Music by: Ernst Hermann Meyer
- Production company: Deutsche Film (DEFA)
- Distributed by: Progress Film
- Release date: 10 September 1965 (West Germany)
- Running time: 114 minutes
- Country: East Germany
- Language: German

Solange Leben in mir ist (English: As Long As There's Life in Me) is a 1965 German biopic from the East German state-owned DEFA studios and director Günter Reisch following the life of the German communist leader Karl Liebknecht during the first half of World War I. It is the first part in a two-part film series about Liebknecht directed by Reisch, starring Horst Schulze as Karl Liebknecht and Lyudmila Kasyanova as Sophie Liebknecht. It is followed by the 1972 sequel Trotz alledem! (English: In Spite of Everything!) which follows Liebknecht's life during the second half of the war and beyond.

== Plot ==
The film opens in Berlin in 1914, as Germany is preparing for World War I. Liebknecht (Schulze) receives a call from a fellow lawyer and revolutionary, Mr. Rauch, that documents have been found proving the German heavy arms industry's secret involvement in the buildup to the war. He brings these documents to a meeting of the Reichstag, accusing Gustav Krupp and his company of bribing officials to release military secrets. In addition to this, Krupp and his company wrote to ask the French media to state that the French military has twice as much artillery as they actually possess so that they may provoke a surge in militarism. Afterward, while celebrating a friend's wedding, Liebknecht learns of the assassination of Archduke Franz Ferdinand, recognizing that this is the war the German imperialists were seeking. However, the resources for war still need to be approved. Liebknecht immediately begins campaigning among the public, denouncing the war as a means to secure profit for the capitalists. In an SPD party meeting, Liebknecht is one of only fourteen members to vote against the war credits. In the subsequent Reichstag meeting, he votes with the party discipline in favor of the war credits, to the public's surprise. He announces in the party meetings that he will no longer yield to party discipline and will stand by his anti-militarist principles even if the party leadership will not do the same. Liebknecht is the only one of the Reichstag — including 111 SPD representatives — to vote against the war loans, resulting in a number of death threats and work bans. Despite his immunity as a Reichstag member, Liebknecht is called to serve on the front as a sapper. It is here that he writes his 1915 manifesto, "The main enemy is at home!" The manifesto is passed among his fellow soldiers on the front before returning home. While he is away, Paul Schreiner, whose wedding Liebknecht attended earlier in the film, dies on the front. This leaves his wife Käthe to raise their newborn child alone and make Liebknecht's manifesto public.

Liebknecht returns to Germany on furlough in 1916, and finds himself ejected from the Reichstag for disorderly conduct. Liebknecht meets with Rosa Luxemburg (Zofia Rysiówna), who was recently released from prison. The two plan to break away from the SPD and found the Spartacus League, in order to maintain revolutionary methods and resist the SPD leadership for supporting an "imperialist war." Liebknecht goes to Jena to raise some youth supporters for a May 1 demonstration in Berlin. On the day of the demonstration, Liebknecht speaks despite threats of arrest. He is quickly gagged and arrested, to be taken in for questioning away from the protesting crowds. Liebknecht is told he has a choice in his sentencing: He can receive a smaller charge with a minimum sentence of one day, or a larger charge of high treason with a minimum sentence of two and a half years. He is offered the smaller sentence in exchange for a promise not to distribute anti-war propaganda in the future, however, Liebknecht turns this down. He is taken to trial as the workers continue protesting in the streets. Liebknecht uses his trial to denounce the imprisonment of fellow revolutionaries and those speaking out against German militarism. At this point, the public is ejected from the trial, which is now to be held behind closed doors. The film concludes with a shots of Liebknecht being escorted to prison, overlaid with text:

ONE MAN RAISED HIS COUNTENANCE ABOVE THE WAR IT WILL SHINE FORTH WITH THE BEAUTY OF HIS COURAGE: LIEBKNECHT

— Henri Barbusse

== Production ==
While there had been earlier films about other German socialist heroes such as Ernst Thälmann, Sohn seiner Klasse (1954) and Führer seiner Klasse (1955), the East German government told the DEFA to begin work a new large-scale project to further document the major personalities of the workers' movement in Germany. In the 1960s, Karl Liebknecht was chosen to be the subject of this new production. Initially, DEFA planned a two-part movie before it chose a two-hour view of the life of Liebknecht, focused not on making a memorial but "making a fellow human accessible." Slatan Dudow was originally slated to be the director until his death in 1963 resulted in the project being taken over by Günter Reisch, who rapidly accelerated production of the film. Screenwriter Michael Tschesno-Hell remained on the project during the switch, having already worked on the script for a similar project with the Thälmann movies where Reisch had also worked as a director.

For this prestigious project 6 million marks were made available by DEFA Studios, an exorbitant sum for the studio at the time (equivalent to €6995843.89 as of 17 May 2026). The shooting lasted for over a year, shot in locations such as Berlin, Potsdam, Leipzig, and Jena, among others. The movie was released on September 10, 1965 in cinemas, and would go on to be the third most successful film of 1965 in East Germany, ranking behind The Adventures of Werner Holt and a film adaptation of the fairy tale King Thrushbeard.

== Awards ==
Günter Reisch, Michael Tschesno-Hell, Horst E. Brandt and Horst Schulze received the National Prize of East Germany in the second class for their achievements. The film also received the certification of "valuable" from the FBW, granting it a partial exemption from entertainment tax.
