= Einmal ist keinmal =

Einmal ist keinmal is a German phrase which translates roughly as "once is never". It may refer to:

- Once Is Never, a 1955 East German film
- "Einmal ist keinmal", a song from the self-titled 1983 album by German pop-rock band Nena
- a phrase from The Unbearable Lightness of Being
