= Albert Hetterle =

German actor (1918–2006)

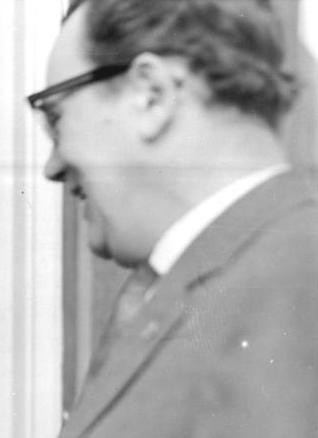
- Albert Hetterle in 1961
- Born: 31 October 1918; Peterstal, Odesa Oblast, Ukraine
- Died: 17 December 2006 (aged 88); Berlin, Germany
- Occupations: Actor; Theatre director
- Political party: SED
- Spouse: Monika Göppert (m. 1940)
- Children: Marc Hetterle; Alexander Hetterle

Albert Hetterle (31 October 1918 – 17 December 2006) was a German actor who also became intendant at the Maxim Gorki Theater in Berlin.

== Early years ==
Albert Hetterle was born in Petersthal a few weeks after the First World War had ended. His father was a farmer. Petersthal was a small village near Odesa. It had been settled by Black Sea Germans a century or so earlier. Hetterle studied pedagogy and was also trained in acting by Ilse Fogarasi. In 1936 he became a trainee-actor with the Odesa Theatre Collective. This was a German-language traveling theatre company in the Odesa region. In 1937 he joined the same company as an actor. During the early 1940s Ukraine was occupied by Germany, and although fighting across much of the Reichskommissariat Ukraine region was savage, in Odesa, which in 1941 was administratively transferred to Transnistria, Hetterle was able to continue working in the German-language theatre.

In 1944, however, as the tide of World War II turned against Germany, there was a massive relocation of ethnic Germans from central and eastern Europe towards the west: Hetterle moved to what would shortly be redesignated as the Soviet occupation zone within what remained of Germany. Along the way, at one stage during 1944, he was employed in Troppau as an official of the Hitler Youth organisation. He was briefly conscripted for military service, but early in 1945 he was released again for reasons of "serious illness".

From 1945 till 1947 he worked at the Chiemsee Peasant Theatre (Chiemseer Bauernbühne). Then, till 1949, his theatre career took him to Sondershausen, with subsequent engagements in Greifswald, Altenburg, Erfurt (1951–1953) and Halle (1953–1955).

== Maxim Gorki Theater ==
In 1955 he was recruited by Maxim Vallentin to the recently established Maxim Gorki Theater in Berlin, where he took the part of Karl Moor in Friedrich Schiller 's Die Räuber. For Hetterle, this was the start of a partnership with the Maxim Gorki Theater that would last for more than three decades.

From 1968 till 1994 Hetterle formed and developed the Maxim Gorki Theatre as its Intendant ("director"). His focus, especially after 1971, was on staging contemporary Soviet works, along with some of the classics. Examples included Maxim Gorky's Vassa Zheleznova (1970), The Lower Depths (1977), The Philistines (1982) and Barbarians (1987). His productions of the German classics included Lessing's Minna von Barnhelm and, from the western socialist repertoire various works by Juan Gelman. There were also guest productions in Karl-Marx-Stadt (as Chemnitz was then known) and Dresden.

During the 1980s the theatre under his direction increasingly staged plays by Soviet authors critical of the political "status quo" in Moscow and, by implicit extrapolation, in East Berlin. A decisive production, in 1988, was the play Die Übergangsgesellschaft (The Transition Society) by Volker Braun, in which the dramatist anticipated the demise of the East German dictatorship.

== Screen work ==
Starting in the late 1950s, Hetterle also made frequent screen appearances in cinema and on television. This included a lead role in the television version of Die Übergangsgesellschaft which was shown on East German television during the country's actual transition year, 1990.

Selected filmography

- 1955: Ernst Thälmann – Führer seiner Klasse
- 1956: Drei Mädchen im Endspiel
- 1956: Thomas Müntzer – Ein Film deutscher Geschichte
- 1957: Spur in die Nacht
- 1959: The Punch Bowl
- 1960: Leute mit Flügeln
- 1962: Das zweite Gleis
- 1963: Geheimarchiv an der Elbe
- 1965: Solange Leben in mir ist
- 1972: Trotz alledem!
- 1973: Das unsichtbare Visier (Television series)
- 1979: Stine (TV)
- 1979: Einfach Blumen aufs Dach
- 1986: Der Hut des Brigadiers
- 1990: Die Übergangsgesellschaft (Television version 1990)

== Awards, honours and memberships ==
- 1962 National Prize of East Germany for arts and literature
- 1967 Became member of Berlin Party Leadership Team (SED-Bezirksleitung)
- 1967 Goethe Prize from the City of Berlin
- 1977 National Prize of East Germany for arts and literature
- 1978 Patriotic Order of Merit
- 1993 Juror for the Alfred Kerr Theatre Prize
