= Erich Franz =

German actor (1903–1961)

- Born: 5 November 1903; Laurahütte, German Empire
- Died: 10 February 1961 (aged 57); East Berlin, East Germany
- Occupation: Actor
- Years active: 1953-1972

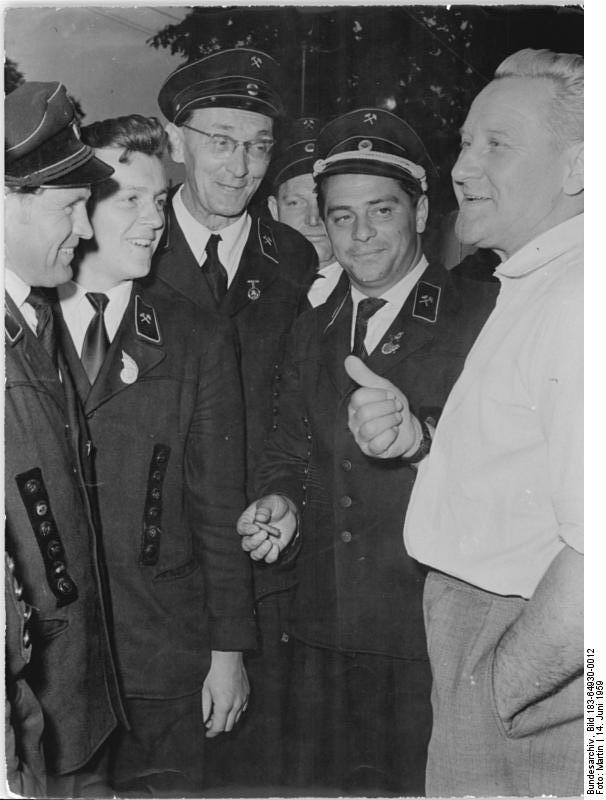
Federal Archives Image 183-64930-0012, Merseburg, I. Workers' Festival, Erich Franz.jpg

Erich Franz (5 November 1903 – 10 February 1961) was a German actor. He appeared in more than thirty East German films from 1953 to 1972.

== Selected filmography ==
| Year | Title | Role | Notes |
|---|---|---|---|
| 1972 | Sun Seekers | | |
| 1961 | Five Days, Five Nights | | |
| 1960 | New Year's Eve Punch | | |
| 1959 | An Old Love | | |
| 1959 | Always on Duty | | |
| 1959 | The Punch Bowl | | |
| 1956 | A Berlin Romance | | |
| 1955 | 52 Weeks Make A Year | | |
| 1954 | Ernst Thälmann | | |
