= Karl Liebknecht (film series) =

Karl Liebknecht is a two-part East German film series directed by Günter Reisch, about the German communist leader Karl Liebknecht (1871–1919), starring Horst Schulze in the part as Liebknecht, and Lyudmila Kasyanova as Sophie Liebknecht.

The first film, Karl Liebknecht - Solange Leben in mir ist, was released in 1965. The second film, released in 1971, was titled Karl Liebknecht - Trotz alledem!

== Cast ==
- Horst Schulze: Karl Liebknecht
- Ludmila Kasjanowa: Sophie Liebknecht
- Rita Krips: Vera Liebknecht
- Mikhail Ulyanov: Frolow
- Albert Hetterle: Paul Schreiner
- Erika Dunkelmann: Milda Schreiner
- Jutta Hoffmann: Käthe Schreiner
- Stefan Lisewski: Werner Gutjahr
- Albert Garbe: Albin Holzer
- Fred Delmare: Waldemar Lehmann
- Wolfgang Ostberg: Ernst Lemke
- Hans Hardt-Hardtloff: Tischler
- Horst-Tanu Margraf: Professor Wendler
- Zofia Rysiówna: Rosa Luxemburg
- Erich Mirek: Wilhelm Pieck
- Siegfried Weiss: Franz Mehring
- Hans Finohr: Georg Ledebour
- Adolf Peter Hoffmann: Gustav Noske
- Otto Lang: Philipp Scheidemann
- Harald Halgardt: Kaiser Wilhelm II.
- Werner Dissel: Theobald von Bethmann Hollweg
- Otto Roland: Minister of War
- Alfred Müller: Gustav Krupp von Bohlen und Halbach
- Arthur Jopp: Albert Südekum
- Peter Sturm: Ober
