= Meister Hans Röckle und Mister Flammfuß =

German children book

Meister Hans Röckle und Mister Flammfuß is a children's book first published in 1968 by Ilse and Vilmos Korn.

== Content ==
The skilful and extremely philanthropic inventor Hans Röckle returns to his home town after a long journey, where he immediately appears as a puppeteer at the fair to entertain the children. Tere, he is also welcomed by two close friends, the young seamstress Louisa, who lives with her blind grandmother, and the farmer's son Jacob, who is learning the cobbler's trade in the town. On the way home, Röckle's landlord confronts him about the rent he owes. Since the master cannot pay, he pawns a music box he made himself.

Meanwhile, the devil Flammfuß is tempted by the Archdevil to take possession of Röckle. To this end, Flammfuß offers the master a contract according to which he will receive the magic Glow-everywhere stone and can use it to cast spells himself. In return, he may only create one copy of each new work and must serve Flammfuß if he once loses motivation. Only the production of gold, which the master is not interested in anyway, is forbidden to him from the outset. In addition, the devil asks for the right to occasionally take one of Röckle's creations for his grandmother's amusement. Although the master is disturbed by the last passage, he agrees.

To help his friends, he creates a self-sewing needle for Louisa and a flute for Jacob with which he can influence the weather. The things do not bring them luck, however. The young seamstress manages to do her work faster, but must always hide to keep the secret and protect the needle from misuse by others. Moreover, because of the contract, Flammfuß takes the utensil but has to give it back because he cannot handle it. Louisa finally gives up the needle and hands it back to Röckle.

Jacob returns to his home village where, thanks to the flute, he helps to reforest the communal forest that was cut down as a Frondienst service and to restore waters that have dried up after excessive use by the manorialist. However, due to the many offers to use the instrument commercially and not for general benefit, which also influences Jacob's brother Martin, he too returns his magic tool to the master.

Meanwhile, he has succeeded in using a magic telescope to see into the future, where poverty and disease have been eradicated. He has also discovered a fountain of Youth, which he uses to cure Louisa's grandmother's eye condition, among other things. The return of the magic things by his friends saddens him, but following a suggestion by Louisa, he makes himself boots with which he can travel in time to hide the needle and flute in the Land of Tomorrow and the Day After Tomorrow. Things are safe there, as the devil has no power over the future.

When Flammfuß learns that the master has created magical footwear for himself, he casts a paralysis spell on Louisa, thereby forcing Jacob to call Röckle back to the present. The devil takes the boots from him, but since he only knows the magic word for returning from time travel, they do not serve the desired purpose for him. In the end, he sends them back to the master and sinks into a crevice in the earth.

In the end, Röckle leaves all his possessions to his friends and asks them to play with the dolls for the children and show them how to fight with the devils. He himself travels into the future again to explore it.

== Origins and publications ==
According to the account of Eleanor Marx, the figure of Hans Röckle and his story were conceived by her father Karl Marx. Ilse and Vilmos Korn learned about the artificial figure through Eleanor's memoirs and initially worked it into their novel Mohr und die Raben von London, in which Marx tells his children about the Master and his contract with the Devil. The stand-alone book Meister Hans Röckle und Mister Flammfuß first appeared in 1968 in commemoration of the 150th birthday of Karl Marx at that time. This was followed by four more editions until 1979 as well as a paperback edition in 1987. All editions were published by Kinderbuchverlag Berlin. In 1971, the publishing house Narodna Mladež in Sofia also published a Bulgarian version.

== Adaptations ==
In 1974, the fairy tale film Hans Röckle and the Devil was commissioned by DEFA and directed by Hans Kratzert, with Rolf Hoppe and Peter Aust in the title roles. The film version closely follows the novel.

Commissioned by the Deutsche Staatsoper, Joachim Werzlau and Günther Deicke adapted the book in the form of an opera, which initially bore the working title Meister Rückte, Ultimately, however, it was titled Meister Röckle in accordance with the book. The work was premiered on 3 October 1976 to great public acclaim and was and was staged several times at home and abroad until 1989, including in Moscow in 1981. A recording made in Berlin's Christuskirche first appeared as a record in 1978.
