= Old Barge, Young Love =

Old Barge, Young Love (German:Alter Kahn und junge Liebe) may refer to:

- Old Barge, Young Love (1957 film), an East German film
- Old Barge, Young Love (1973 film), a West German film director by Werner Jacobs
