= Max Walter Schulz =

German writer

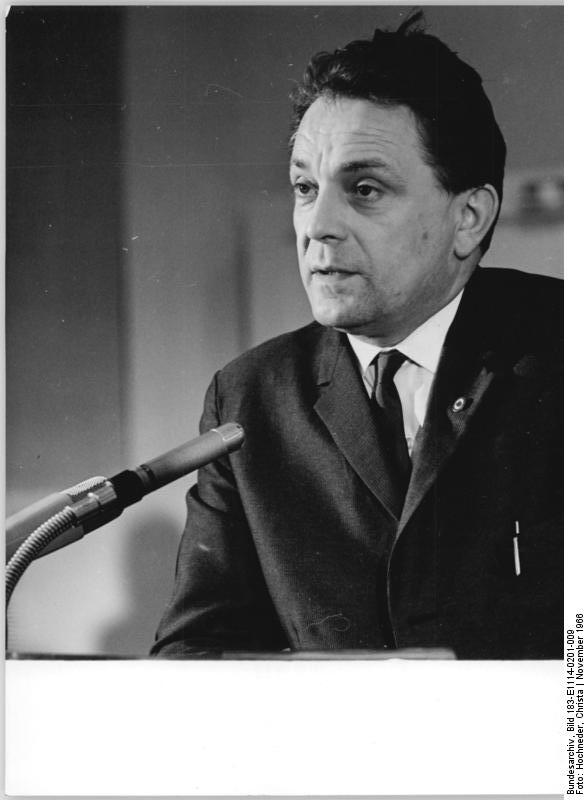
1966

Max Walter Schulz (31 October 1921 – 15 November 1991) was an East German author and part of that country's literary establishment.

== Life ==
Max Walter Schulz was born in Scheibenberg, a small town in the Erzgebirge mining district in the mountains south of Chemnitz. His father was an office worker. He attended primary school and enrolled at secondary school, but appears to have left before completing the course. He was conscripted for military service, serving in the army between 1939 and 1945. During the final part of his military service he was held by the Americans as a prisoner of war.

Military defeat left the western two thirds of Germany divided into four separately administered military occupation zones. Schulz's home region was now administered as part of the Soviet occupation zone, and it was to the Soviet zone that he returned, following his release at the end of the war. During 1945/46 he took casual work, and was also employed for a time as a teacher under the "Neulehrer" scheme, introduced in occupied Germany to try and mitigate the chronic shortage of surviving school teachers. Between 1946 and 1949 he studied pedagogy at the Leipzig University. While he was a student, Schulz joined the Socialist Unity Party. Between 1950 and 1957 he taught at the middle school in Holzhausen (Leipzig).

Between 1957 and 1959 Schulz resumed his own education, attending the "Johannes R. Becher" Literature Institute (as it was known at that time) in Leipzig. It was, according to (at least) one source, "the most important training institution for young writers in the German Democratic Republic". (Note: The Soviet occupation zone had been relaunched as the Soviet sponsored German Democratic Republic (East Germany) in October 1949.) In 1964 Schulz succeeded Max Zimmering as Director of the Institute. He remained in the position for nearly twenty years, skilfully charting for the institute a sometimes challenging course between scholarly integrity and the shifting political expectations of party officialdom.

In 1983, Schulz took a new job as editor in chief of the prestigious fortnightly literary journal, Sinn und Form, taking over from Paul Wiens. He retired in 1990.

== Writer ==
Max Walter Schulz was the author of novels, short stories, reviews and essays. His fictional writing is typical of East Germany's so-called "Bitterfeld Path literature", intended both to point the way to an independent "socialist national culture" and to satisfy the "growing artistic and aesthetic needs of the working population". A particular case in point was "Wir sind nicht Staub im Wind" (We are not dust in the wind) which appeared in 1962, intended at the time as the first part of a planned multi-volume cycle. It achieved great success with East German readers.

By the end of the 1960s Schulz had established his credentials with readers as a novelist, with academics as a literary mentor and with the party, to the point at which his critical and "semi-official" pronouncements about the new generation of writers became important for the subsequent development of East German literature.

== Memberships (selection) ==
Max Walter Schulz was naturally a member of the (East) German Writers' Association ("Deutscher Schriftstellerverband"). He served during 1962/63 as its secretary. Then, between 1969 and 1990, he served as 9ne of the association's (normally approximately five) vice-presidents.

Between 1967 and 1969 Schulz was a candidate for membership of the regional party leadership team ("Bezirksleitung") for Leipzig, then serving for a further two years, till 1971, as a full member of it.

In 1969 he was elected to membership of the (East) German Academy of Arts.

== Recognition (selection) ==
- 1963 Literature prize of the FDGB (Trade Union Federation)
- 1963 Schulz accepted an invitation to attend a meeting of Group 47 in Saulgau and read from his novel "Wir sind nicht Staub im Wind"
- 1964 National Prize
- 1969 "Professor" title
- 1978 Patriotic Order of Merit
- 1980 National Prize
- 1986 Patriotic Order of Merit Honor Clasp
- 1987 Doctor honoris causa, University of Leipzig

== Output (selection) ==
- Wir sind nicht Staub im Wind, Halle (Saale) 1962
- "Stegreif und Sattel", Halle (Saale) 1967
- Kontakte, Halle (S.) 1970
- Triptychon mit sieben Brücken, Halle (Saale) 1974
- Das kleine Mädchen und der fliegende Fisch, Berlin 1978 (jointly with Albrecht von Bodecker)
- Pinocchio und kein Ende, Halle etc. 1978
- Der Soldat und die Frau, Halle (Saale) 1978
- Die Fliegerin oder Aufhebung einer stummen Legende, Halle etc. 1981
- Auf Liebe stand Tod, Berlin 1983 (three novels – of which the third is very short – in a single volume: Der Soldat und die Frau, Die Fliegerin oder Aufhebung einer stummen Legende and Unser Wermut)
