= Ein Strom fließt durch Deutschland =

1954 film

- Directed by: Joachim Kunert
- Release date: 1954
- Country: East Germany
- Language: German

Ein Strom fließt durch Deutschland is an East German documentary film about the river Elbe. It was directed by Joachim Kunert and released in 1954.
