= Joachim Kunert =

German film director (1929–2020)

- Born: 24 September 1929; Berlin, Germany
- Died: 18 September 2020 (aged 90)
- Occupations: Film director, screenwriter
- Years active: 1954–1989

Joachim Kunert (24 September 1929 – 18 September 2020) was a German film director and screenwriter. He directed more than 20 films between 1954 and 1989. His 1965 film The Adventures of Werner Holt was entered into the 4th Moscow International Film Festival.

== Selected filmography ==
- Ein Strom fließt durch Deutschland (1954, documentary)
- Die Dresdner Philharmoniker (1955, documentary)
- Besondere Kennzeichen: keine (1956)
- Tatort Berlin (1958)
- Der Lotterieschwede (1958)
- Ehesache Lorenz (1959)
- Seilergasse 8 (1960)
- The Second Track (1962)
- The Adventures of Werner Holt (1965)
