= Once Is Never =

1955 film

- Directed by: Konrad Wolf
- Written by: Paul Wiens; Konrad Wolf
- Starring: Horst Drinda; Brigitte Krause; Paul Schulz-Wernburg
- Cinematography: Werner Bergmann
- Edited by: Friedel Welsandt
- Music by: Günter Kochan
- Production company: DEFA
- Distributed by: VEB Progress Film
- Release date: 25 March 1955
- Running time: 97 minutes
- Country: East Germany
- Language: German

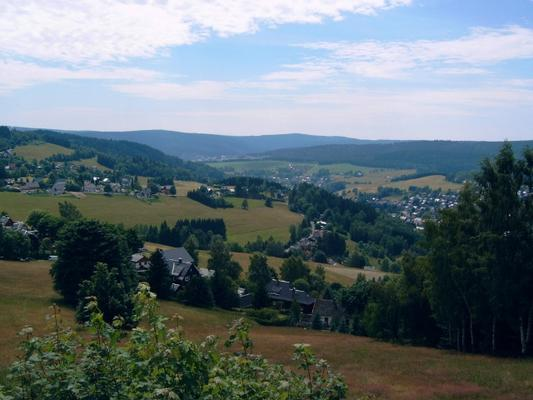

Once Is Never (German: Einmal ist keinmal) is a 1955 East German comedy film directed by Konrad Wolf and starring Horst Drinda, Brigitte Krause and Paul Schulz-Wernburg. It was made by the state-controlled studio DEFA.

== Cast ==
- Horst Drinda as Peter Weselin
- Brigitte Krause as Anna Hunzele
- Paul Schulz-Wernburg as Edeltanne
- Annemone Haase as Elvira
- Christoph Engel as Erwin
- Friedrich Gnaß as Hunzele
- Georg Niemann as Düdelit-Düdelat
- Lotte Loebinger as Muhme
- Hilmar Thate as Buhlemann
- Fritz Decho as Fibrament
- Horst Gentzen as Gack
- Edgar Engelmann as Gwriz
- Erich Brauer as Kranz
- Johanna Bucher as Frau Kranz
- Johannes Siegert as Dr. Scherb
- Inge Huber as Marie Alvert
- Johannes Arpe as Arzt
- Gertrud Paulun as Haushälterin
- Norbert Christian as Pinco
- Gustav Müller as Wadenwärmer
- Liska Merbach as Luise
- Paul Pfingst as Fahrer
- Jutta Beetz as Rothaarige Dame
- Maika Joseph as 1. Beerenfrau
- Lotte Meyer as 2. Beerenfrau
- Rolf Bartholsen as Briefträger
- de:Jutta Zoff as Akkordeonsolistin

== Bibliography ==
- Davidson, John & Hake, Sabine. Framing the Fifties: Cinema in a Divided Germany. Berghahn Books, 2007.
