= Irmtraud Morgner =

German novelist

Irmtraud Elfriede Morgner
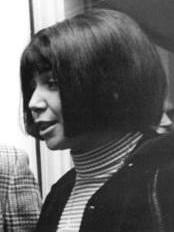
- Morgner at the 7th Congress of GDR Writers (1973)
- Born: 22 August 1933; Chemnitz, Germany
- Died: 6 May 1990 (aged 56); Berlin, East Germany
- Spouse(s): Joachim Schreck (195?–1970); Paul Wiens (1972–1977)
- Writing career
- Notable awards: Heinrich Mann Prize (1975); National Prize of East Germany (1977); Roswitha Prize (1985); Kassel Literary Prize (1989)

Irmtraud Morgner (22 August 1933 – 6 May 1990) was a German writer, best known for works of magical realism concerned predominantly with the role of gender in East German society.

== Life ==
Irmtraud Morgner was born in 1933 in Chemnitz, the daughter of a railroad engineer. She took her Abitur in 1952, before studying Germanistik (German studies) and Literary studies at Leipzig until 1956. She worked for the magazine neue deutsche literatur (New German Literature, a journal noted for a degree of confrontation with East German cultural policy) until 1958, after which she lived as a freelance author.

Morgner's first marriage was to Joachim Schreck, later an editor at the publishers Aufbau-Verlag. She gave birth to a son in 1967. Morgner and Schreck were divorced in 1970. She was married again in 1972, to Paul Wiens, a fellow poet and author. Wiens, like many thousands in East German, was an 'unofficial employee' of the Stasi and informed on Morgner throughout their marriage. They divorced in 1977.

She contributed the piece "Witch Vilmma's invention of speech-swallowing" to the 1984 anthology Sisterhood Is Global: The International Women's Movement Anthology, edited by Robin Morgan.

Morgner was diagnosed with cancer in 1987. She underwent several operations during the late 1980s, but died in May 1990.

== Work ==
After producing a number of relatively conventional socialist realist works, she gained a greater degree of notability and success in 1968 with the novel Hochzeit in Konstantinopel (Wedding in Constantinople). This work, a blend of realism and fantasy exploring feminist themes, was a fresh development in East German literature. While her work as a whole is generally argued to be predominantly concerned with gender, Morgner also touches upon other issues in East German society. She clearly satirises the stultifying effect of censorship on literature under the regime, censorship that she herself often fell foul of. Whilst winning notable awards in East Germany, she was nevertheless subject to surveillance herself, and her works to heavy editing and often rejection.

Her magnum opus may be considered Leben und Abenteuer der Trobadora Beatriz nach Zeugnissen ihrer Spielfrau Laura (The Life and Adventures of Trobadora Beatrice as Chronicled by Her Minstrel Laura). A 'novel in thirteen books and seven intermezzos', it may be considered an epistolary novel as it includes (other than straight narrative) love poetry, morse code, exchanges of correspondence and transcripts. The 'intermezzos' were created from Rumba auf einen Herbst (Rumba for Autumn), a novel previously rejected by the censors in 1965. Together with its sequel Amanda. Ein Hexenroman (Amanda. A Witch's Tale), Leben und Abenteuer der Trobadora Beatriz… was to form a trilogy centred on 'Laura (Amanda) Salman', .

In her final years, cancer somewhat impaired her productivity, and she never completed the 'Salman trilogy'. Fragments of the third novel were later published posthumously as Das heroische Testament (The Heroic Testament).

== Works ==
- Das Signal steht auf Fahrt. Berlin, 1959
- Ein Haus am Rand der Stadt. Berlin, 1962
- Hochzeit in Konstantinopel. Berlin, 1968
- Gauklerlegende. Berlin, 1970
- Die wundersamen Reisen Gustavs des Weltfahrers. Berlin, 1972
- Leben und Abenteuer der Trobadora Beatriz nach Zeugnissen ihrer Spielfrau Laura. Berlin, 1974
  - The Life and Adventures of Trobadora Beatrice as Chronicled by Her Minstrel Laura (translated by Jeanette Clausen). University of Nebraska Press, 2000
- Geschlechtertausch (with Sarah Kirsch und Christa Wolf). Darmstadt, 1980
- Amanda. Ein Hexenroman (Amanda. A Witch's Tale). Berlin, 1983
- Die Hexe im Landhaus (with Erica Pedretti). Zürich, 1984
- Der Schöne und das Biest. Leipzig, 1991
- Rumba auf einen Herbst. Hamburg, 1992
- Das heroische Testament (The Heroic Testament). München, 1998
- Erzählungen. Berlin, 2006
