= Norbert Christian =

German actor (1925–1976)

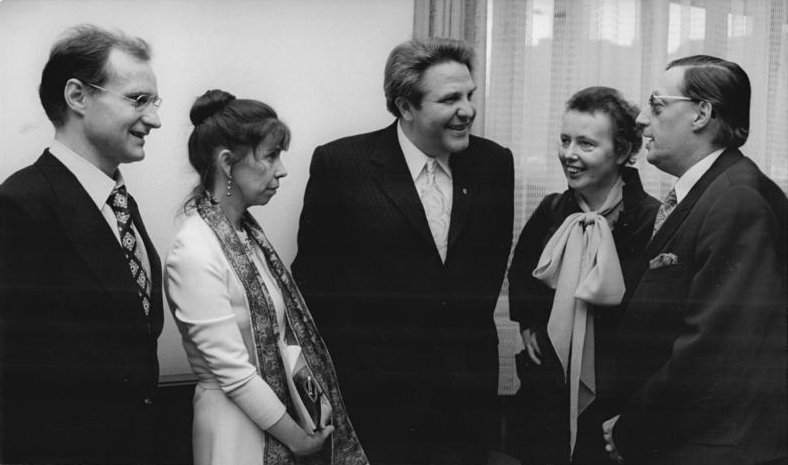
- Norbert Christian (on the right) in 1973.
- Born: 5 December 1925; Berlin, Weimar Republic
- Died: 18 December 1976 (age 51); East Berlin, East Germany
- Other name: Christian Hengst
- Occupation: Actor
- Years active: 1953-1976 (film)

Norbert Christian (1925–1976) was a German film and television actor.

== Selected filmography ==
- Once Is Never (1955)
- Thomas Müntzer (1956)
- Goods for Catalonia (1959)
- Italienisches Capriccio (1961)
- Follow Me, Scoundrels (1964)
- Die schwarze Mühle (1975, vocal cords for Leon Niemczyk)

== Bibliography ==
- Stephen Brockmann. A Critical History of German Film. Camden House, 2010.
