= Die Dresdner Philharmoniker =

1955 film

- Directed by: Joachim Kunert
- Release date: 1955
- Country: East Germany
- Language: German

Die Dresdner Philharmoniker is an East German documentary film. It follows the Dresden Philharmonic and its artistic manager Heinz Bongartz on a tour to Czechoslovakia, France, Hungary and Romania. It was directed by Joachim Kunert and released in 1955.
