= New Year's Eve Punch =

1960 film

- Directed by: Günter Reisch
- Written by: Marianne Reinke; Gerhard Weise; Günter Reisch
- Starring: Erich Franz; Friedel Nowack; Erika Dunkelmann
- Cinematography: Karl Plintzner
- Edited by: Hildegard Conrad
- Music by: Helmut Nier
- Production company: DEFA
- Release date: 30 December 1960
- Running time: 91 minutes
- Country: East Germany
- Language: German

New Year's Eve Punch (German: Silvesterpunsch) is a 1960 East German musical film directed by Günter Reisch and starring Erich Franz, Friedel Nowack and Erika Dunkelmann. It was made by the state-owned DEFA company. It is a sequel to the 1959 film The Punch Bowl.

== Cast ==
- Erich Franz as Wilhelm Lehmann
- Friedel Nowack as Auguste Lehmann
- Erika Dunkelmann as Marion Lehmann
- Christel Bodenstein as Suse Lehmann
- Heinz Draehn as Franz Lehmann
- Achim Schmidtchen as Michel Lehmann
- Ernst-Georg Schwill as Knispel
- Karin Schröder as Ruth
- Wolfgang Roeder as Wolfgang
- Eberhard Keyn as Eberhard
- Erich Weber as Erich
- Johannes Frenzel (actor) as Hannes
- Albert Zahn as Otto
- Otto Busse as Karl
- Herbert Sturm as Herbert
- Edward Selz as Siggi
- Hubert Hoelzke as Egon Scheibe
- Gustav Müller as Erwin Lüttger
- Günter Rüger as Willibald Schmal
- Kurt Rackelmann as Briefträger Pätsch
- Rudolf Christoph as Werkleiter
- Heinz Quermann as Reporter
- Heinz Scholz as Objektleiter
- Gerd E. Schäfer as Lämmermeier
- Maria Alexander as Sängerin
- Maika Joseph as Garderobenfrau
- Nico Turoff as Kassierer an der Box-Kasse
- Joachim Zschocke as Verkehrspolizist
- Monika Bergen as Chemiemädchen

== Bibliography ==
- Lutz Peter Koepnick. The Cosmopolitan Screen: German Cinema and the Global Imaginary, 1945 to the Present. University of Michigan Press, 2007.
