= The Second Track =

1962 film

- Directed by: Joachim Kunert
- Starring: Albert Hetterle; Annekathrin Bürger
- Release date: 26 October 1962
- Running time: 1h 20min
- Country: East Germany
- Language: German

The Second Track (German: Das zweite Gleis) is a 1962 East German drama film directed by Joachim Kunert. It is the only DEFA film looking at the Nazi Germany history in East Germany.

== Cast ==
- Albert Hetterle - Walter Brock
- Annekathrin Bürger - Vera Brock - seine Tochter
- Horst Jonischkan - Frank
- Walter Richter-Reinick - Erwin Runge
- Helga Göring - Frau Gertrud Runge
- Erik S. Klein - Heinz Gericke
- Johanna Clas - Frau Anneliese Merkel
- Brigitte Lindenberg - Angestellte im Kdh.
- Paul Berndt - Kriminalbeamter
- Walter E. Fuß - Lokführer
