= Robert Mayer – der Arzt aus Heilbronn =

1955 film

Robert Mayer - der Arzt aus Heilbronn
- Directed by: Helmut Spieß
- Music by: Joachim Werzlau
- Release date: 1955
- Country: East Germany
- Language: German

Robert Mayer – der Arzt aus Heilbronn is an East German film. It was released in 1955.
