= Saure Wochen – frohe Feste =

1950 film

- Directed by: Wolfgang Schleif
- Music by: Joachim Werzlau
- Release date: 1950
- Country: East Germany
- Language: German

Saure Wochen – frohe Feste is an East German film. It was released in 1950.
