= Tinko =

1957 film

- Directed by: Herbert Ballmann
- Music by: Joachim Werzlau
- Release date: 1957
- Country: East Germany
- Language: German

Tinko is an East German film. It was released in 1957.
