= Alfred Maack =

German actor

- Born: 5 April 1882; Hamburg, German Empire
- Died: 14 February 1961 (aged 78); East Berlin, East Germany
- Occupation: Actor
- Years active: 1937-1958 (film)

Alfred Maack (5 April 1882 – 14 February 1961) was a German stage and film actor. He appeared in more than fifty films from 1937 to 1958.

== Selected filmography ==
Film
Year	Title	Role	Notes
1937	Der Etappenhase	Claus Ummen	
1938	The Marriage Swindler		
1939	Robert and Bertram		
1939	Liberated Hands		
1943	A Flea in Her Ear		
1943	A Man with Principles?		
1944	The Degenhardts		
1950	Der Kahn der fröhlichen Leute	August	
1951	The Call of the Sea		
1953	Anna Susanna	Peer Frensen	
1954	Das geheimnisvolle Wrack		
1955	Alibi		
1957	Old Barge, Young Love	Heinrich Borchert	
