= Das geheimnisvolle Wrack =

1954 East German adventure film

- Directed by: Herbert Ballmann
- Written by: Gerhard Bengsch (novel); Kurt Bortfeldt
- Starring: Kurt Ulrich
- Music by: Joachim Werzlau
- Release date: 1954
- Running time: 75 minutes
- Country: East Germany
- Language: German

Das geheimnisvolle Wrack is an East German adventure film directed by Herbert Ballmann. It was released in 1954.

== Cast ==
- Kurt Ulrich as Karl Drews
- Wilfried Ortmann as Oberleutnant Herbert Fröhlich
- Hans-Hasso Steube as Leutnant Gerhard Schrader
- Horst Naumann as Unteroffizier Heinz Kersten
- Charlotte Küter as Anna Röhrdanz
- Erika Dunkelmann as Stine Drews
- Maria Besendahl as Augustine Schmalz (as Anna-Maria Besendahl)
- Krista Körner as Wittke Röhrdanz
- Alfred Maack as Großvater Timm
- Paul Pfingst as Älterer Grenzpolizist
- Heinz Laggies as Maat Fritz Schütte
- Hans Neie as Soldat Bruno Schulz
- Herwart Grosse as Baron von Bleich
- Horst Preusker as Hartmut Liebscher
