= Helga Göring =

German actress

- Born: 14 January 1922; Meißen, Germany
- Died: 3 October 2010 (aged 88); Berlin, Germany
- Occupation: Actress
- Years active: 1952-2007 (film)

Helga Göring (1922–2010) was a German stage, television and film actress.

== Selected filmography ==
- Castles and Cottages (1957)
- Two Mothers (1957)
- Sheriff Teddy (1957)
- Erich Kubak (1959)
- The Second Track (1962)
- Minna von Barnhelm (1962)
- Follow Me, Scoundrels (1964)
- Trace of Stones (1966)
- No Place to Go (2000), as Hanna's mother

== Series ==
- Geschichten uebern Gartenzaun (1982-1985)

== Bibliography ==
- Stephen Brockmann. A Critical History of German Film. Camden House, 2010.
