= Old Barge, Young Love (1957 film) =

1957 film

Alter Kahn und junge Liebe
- Directed by: Hans Heinrich
- Written by: Hans Heinrich
- Produced by: Werner Dau
- Starring: Alfred Maack
- Cinematography: Eugen Klagemann
- Edited by: Hildegard Tegener, Ferdinand Weintraub
- Music by: Gerd Natschinski
- Production company: Defa
- Distributed by: Progress Film
- Release date: 22 February 1957
- Running time: 80 minutes
- Country: GDR
- Language: German

Alter Kahn und junge Liebe (English-language title: Old Barge, Young Love) is an East German (then GDR) romance film directed by Hans Heinrich. It was released in 1957.

== Plot ==
Skipper Vollbeck leads a small group of barges traveling down the Havel from Berlin to Waren. To meet his debtors' demands, he loaded his ship with cement almost beyond its capability to carry. Horst, the skipper of one of the other boats, and Vollbeck's son Kalle both fall in love with the older skipper's niece Anna, who joined the journey. Eventually, she chooses Kalle and they marry, after the barges manage to make it to Waren.

== Cast ==
- Alfred Maack as Heinrich Borchert
- Erika Dunkelmann as Marie
- Götz George as Karl 'Kalle'
- Gustav Püttjer as Herrmann Vollbeck
- Maria Häussler as Anne Vollbeck
- Kurt Schmidtchen as Ernst
- Horst Naumann as Horst Richter
- Uwe Torsten as Buttje
- Elfie Dugal as lady
- Waltraud Kogel as the assistant
- Alice Prill as secretary

== Production ==
The film was one of the more light-hearted DEFA productions of the second half of the 1950s, created after a wave of highly ideological films were negatively received by the public. According to author Heinz Kersten, it had only "a modest saying on the matters of society" and was "entertainment". It was Götz George's first major role on the screen.

== Reception ==
The West German Catholic Film Service described the film as "having several clumsy moments. Generally, an undemanding piece of entertainment." The World Stage newspaper's critic dubbed as "dramatically dull."
