= Sinn und Form =

Bimonthly literary and cultural magazine in Berlin, Germany

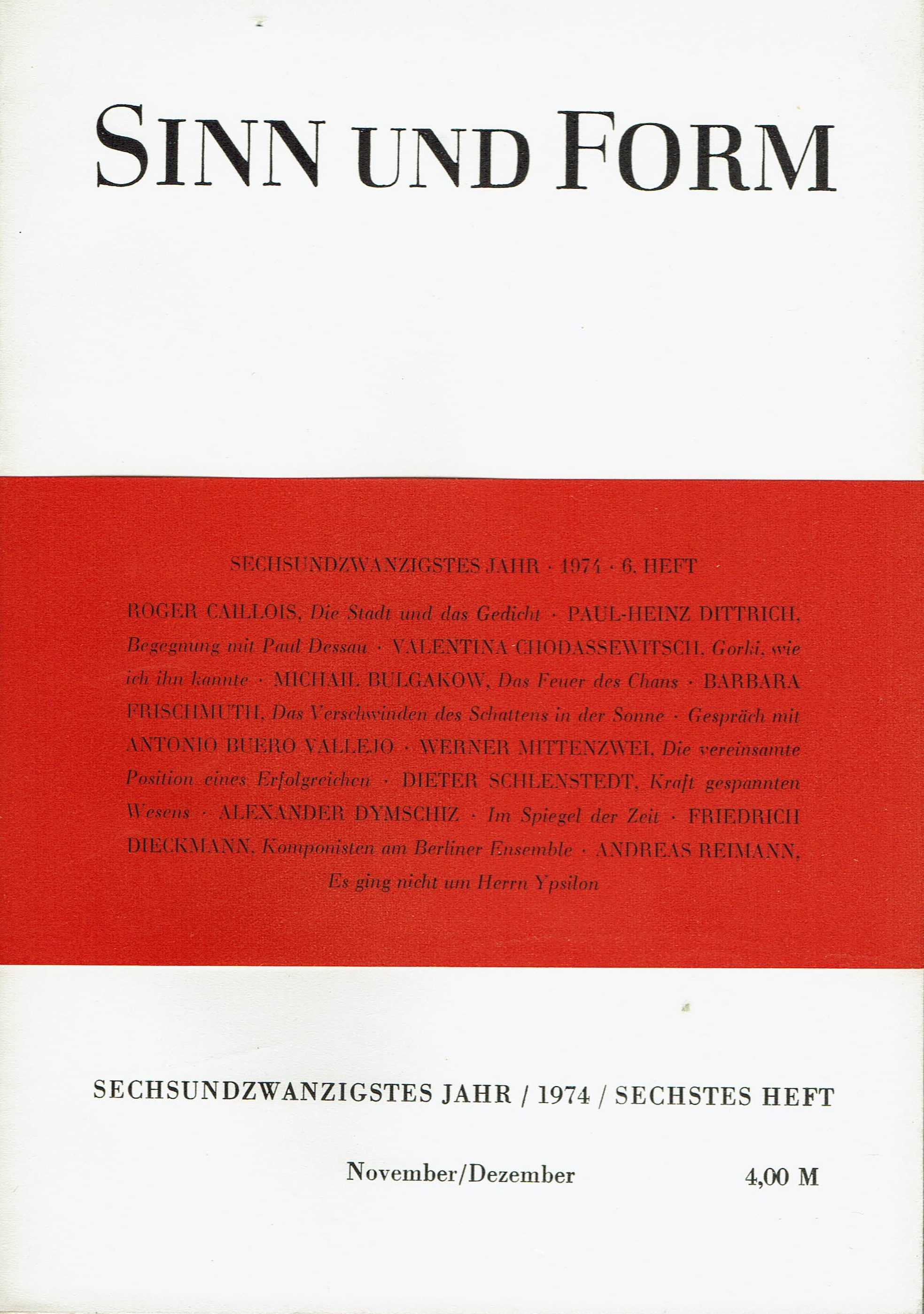
- Cover page dated 1974
- Editor-in-chief: Matthias Weichelt
- Categories: Literary magazine; Cultural magazine
- Frequency: Bimonthly
- Publisher: Akademie der Künste
- Founder: Johannes R. Becher; Paul Wiegler
- First issue: 1949
- Country: Germany
- Based in: Berlin
- Language: German
- Website: sinn-und-form.de
- ISSN: 0037-5756
- OCLC: 1371069324

Sinn und Form (German: Sense and Form) is a bimonthly literary and cultural magazine. It was launched in East Berlin, East Germany, in 1949 and is still in circulation. The magazine describes itself as one of the definitive cultural journals in Germany.

== History and profile ==
The magazine was established by Johannes R. Becher and Paul Wiegler in 1949. The original title was Maß und Wert (German: Measure and Value). When it was published in the East Germany, the magazine was employed by the ruling party, Socialist Unity Party, as a media outlet for its cultural policy. However, the magazine was not enthusiastic about this relationship. Because since its start it has had a unique style which is apolitical. It covers articles on poetry and philosophy, anthropology and theology and the relations between art and science. It provides essays, poems, stories, diaries, letters and conversations on these topics.

In 1975 a novel by Volker Braun entitled Unvollendete Geschicht was published in the magazine, but the novel was not published as a book in East Germany and appeared as a print book only in 1998.

Sinn und Form is published by the Akademie der Künste in Berlin on a bimonthly basis. The magazine has been the subject of the scholarly analysis, and at least two books were published about the magazine.

=== Editors and contributors ===
The editors-in-chief of the magazine include the following:

- Peter Huchel (1949–1962)
- Bodo Uhse (1963)
- Wilhelm Girnus (1964–1981)
- Paul Wiens (1982)
- Max Walter Schulz (1983–1990)
- Sebastian Kleinschmidt (1991–2013)
- Matthias Weichelt (2013–)

Notable contributors of Sinn und Form are Miguel Ángel Asturias, Imre Kertész, Halldór Laxness, Czeslaw Milosz, Pablo Neruda, Romain Rolland, Jürgen Habermas, Nelly Sachs, Heiner Müller, Ernst Jünger, Hilde Domin, Volker Braun, Peter Härtling, Durs Grünbein, and Jürgen Becker. During the editorship of Peter Huchel the magazine featured the work by German and international non-Communist writers, and unpublished works by Bertolt Brecht were published in two special issues of the magazine. Robert Havemann, chemist and later dissident, published articles in the magazine criticizing modern socialism and revisionist works of the Western authors.

The founding editor-in-chief Peter Huchel was forced by the East German authorities to resign from the post.
