= Horst Naumann =

German actor (1925–2024)

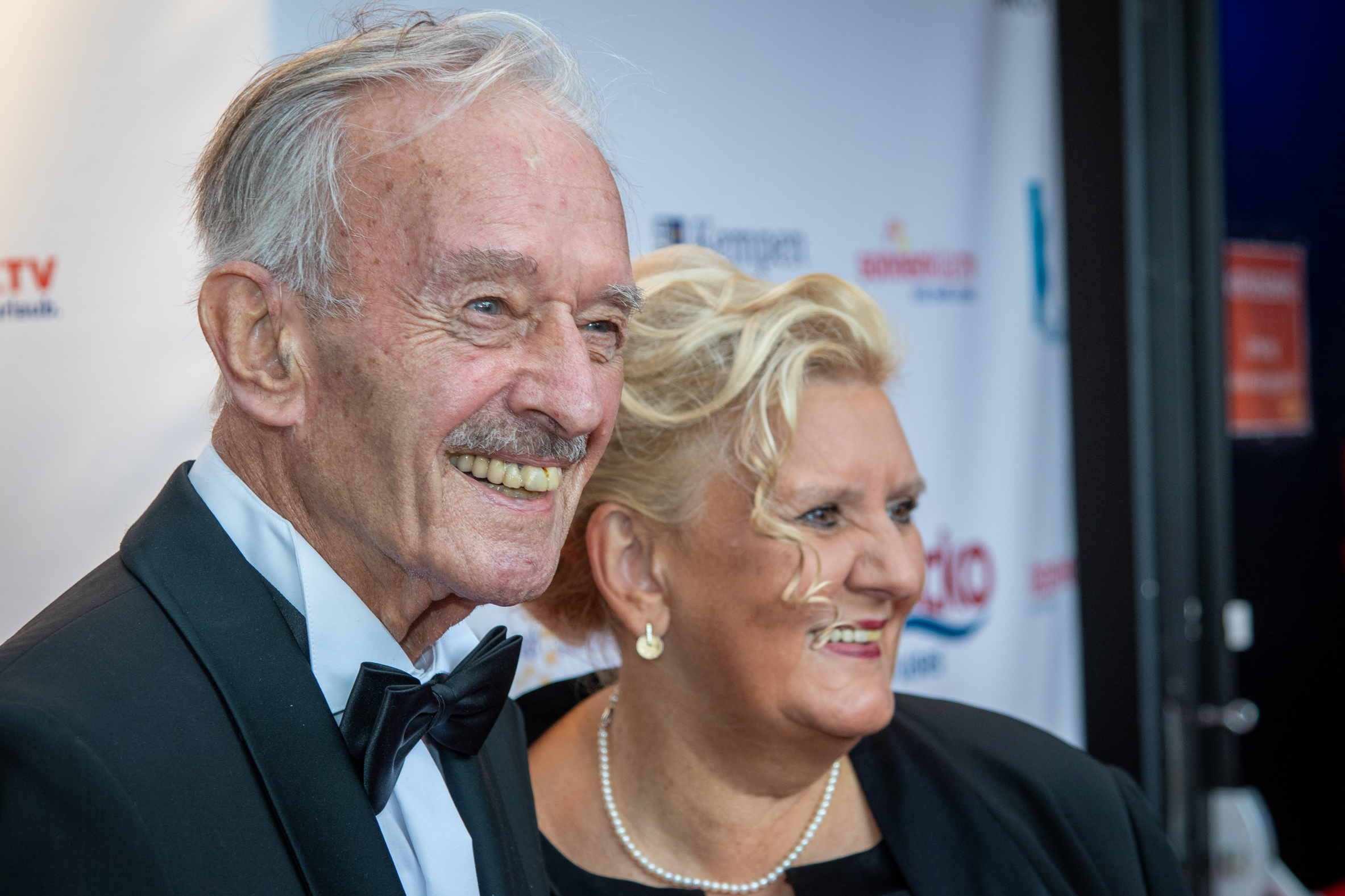
Naumann and wife in 2021

Horst Naumann (17 November 1925 – 19 February 2024) was a German actor. Born in Dresden, Germany on 17 November 1925, he died in Duisburg on 19 February 2024, at the age of 98.

== Selected filmography ==
- Das geheimnisvolle Wrack (1954)
- Carola Lamberti – Eine vom Zirkus (1954)
- Just Once a Great Lady (1957)
- Alter Kahn und junge Liebe (1957)
- U 47 – Kapitänleutnant Prien (1958)
- Court Martial (1959)
- Do Not Send Your Wife to Italy (1960)
- The Last of Mrs. Cheyney (1961)
- The Transport (1961)
- The Forester's Daughter (1962)
- The Doctor of St. Pauli (1968)
- On the Reeperbahn at Half Past Midnight (1969)
- The Priest of St. Pauli (1970)
- Bloody Friday (1972)
- Old Barge, Young Love (1973)
- Das Traumschiff (1983–2010, TV series)
