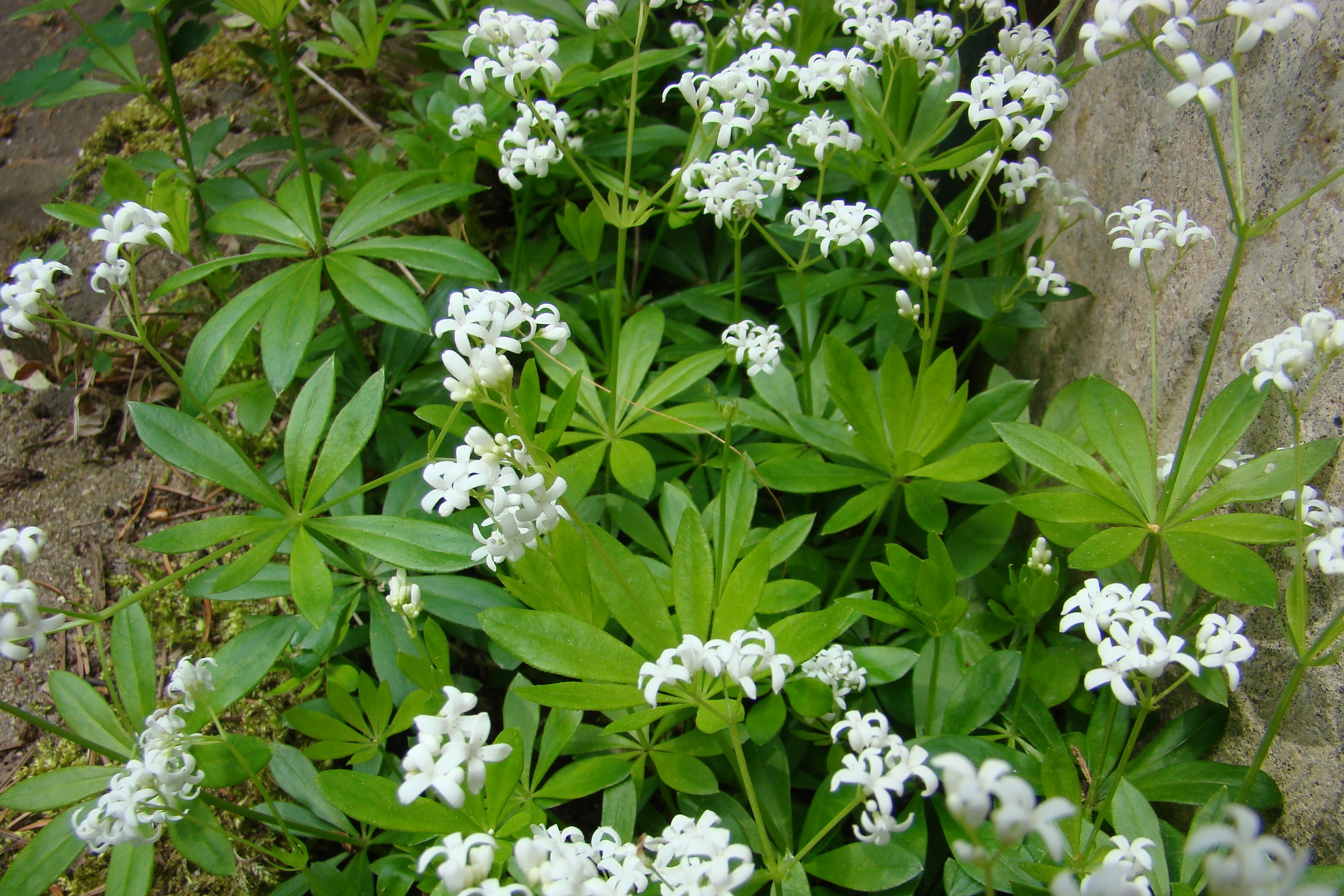

Scientific classification
- Kingdom: Plantae
- Clade: Tracheophytes
- Clade: Angiosperms
- Clade: Eudicots
- Clade: Asterids
- Order: Gentianales
- Family: Rubiaceae
- Genus: Galium
- Species: G. odoratum

Binomial name
- Galium odoratum (L.) Scop.

Synonyms
- Asperula odorata L.; Galium matrisylva F.H.Wigg.; Asperula odora Salisb.; Chlorostemma odoratum (L.) Fourr.; Asperula matrisylva Gilib.; Asperula zangezurensis Huseynov.; Asterophyllum asperula Schimp. & Spenn. in F.C.L.Spenner; Asterophyllum sylvaticum Schimp. & Spenn. in F.C.L.Spenner; Asperula eugeniae K.Richt.; Galium odoratum var. eugeniae (K.Richt.) Ehrend. in E.Janchen

= Galium odoratum =

Species of flowering plant

Galium odoratum, the sweet woodruff or sweetscented bedstraw, is a flowering perennial plant in the family Rubiaceae, native to much of Europe. It is widely cultivated for its flowers and its sweet-smelling foliage.

== Description ==
A rhizomatous herbaceous perennial plant that grows upright to 25–50 cm (10–19 1/2 in) high. The leaves are simple, lanceolate, glabrous, 2–5 cm (3/4–2 in) long, and borne in whorls of six to nine. The small (4–7 mm diameter) flowers are produced in cymes, each white with four petals joined together at the base. The fruits are 2–4 mm in diameter, produced singly, and each is covered in tiny, hooked bristles, which help disperse them by sticking temporarily to clothing and animal fur.

It owes its sweet smell to the presence of the compound coumarin.

== Distribution and habitat ==
The plant is native to much of Europe from Spain and Ireland to Russia, as well as Western Siberia, Turkey, Iran, the Caucasus, China, and Japan. It is also sparingly naturalised in scattered locations in the United States and Canada.

== Ecology ==
This plant prefers partial to full shade in moist, rich soils. In dry summers, it needs frequent watering. Propagation is by crown division, separation of the rooted stems, or digging up of the barely submerged perimeter stolons. It is ideal as a groundcover or border accent in woody, acidic gardens where other shade plants fail to thrive. In the northeastern United States, deer and chickens avoid eating it.

== Toxicity ==
Industrial usage of the plant for sweets was prohibited in Germany in 1974, due to coumarin, the flavorant found in woodruff, being toxic to rats and mice in studies. It has, however, not been found to be harmful to humans, even in large doses, in which it follows a different metabolic pathway. The flavour is still popular for sweets in Germany, but is achieved artificially with 6-methyl coumarin. Products targeted towards adults, such as alcoholic drinks, are still permitted to include coumarin, in limited quantities.

== Uses ==
It is widely cultivated for its flowers and sweet-smelling foliage.

As its specific epithet odoratum suggests, the plant is strongly scented, the sweet scent being derived from coumarin. This scent increases on wilting and then persists on drying, and the dried plant is used in potpourri and as a moth deterrent. It was, and partially is, used to flavour May wine (called Maibowle or Maitrank in German), sweet juice punch, syrup for beer (Berliner Weisse), brandy, jelly, jam, a soft drink (Tarhun, which is Georgian), ice cream, and herbal tea. Also very popular are sweet woodruff-flavoured jellies, with and without alcohol. In Germany, where it is called Waldmeister, it was and to some extent still is also used to flavour sherbet powder.

== Gallery ==
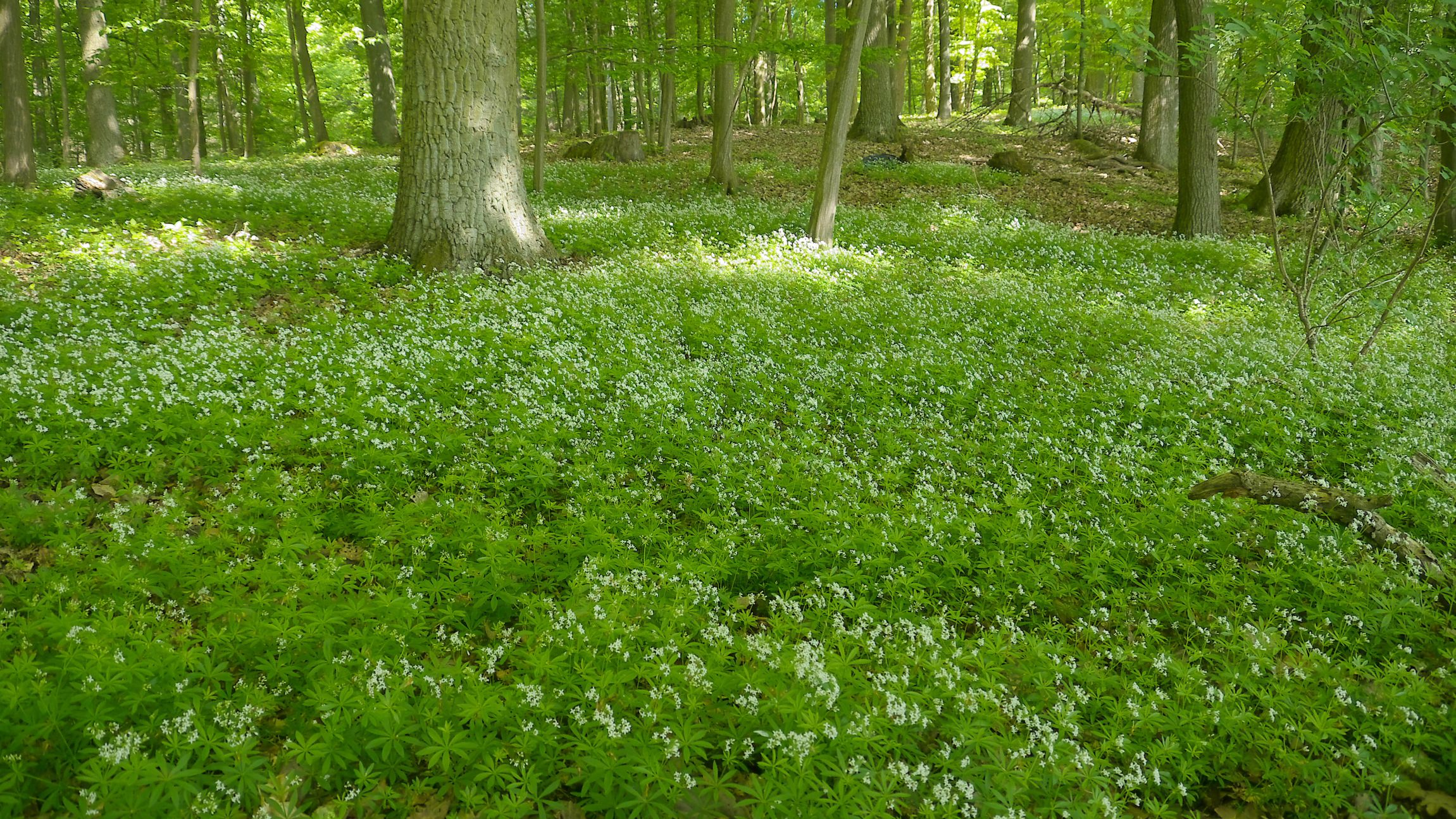
Habit

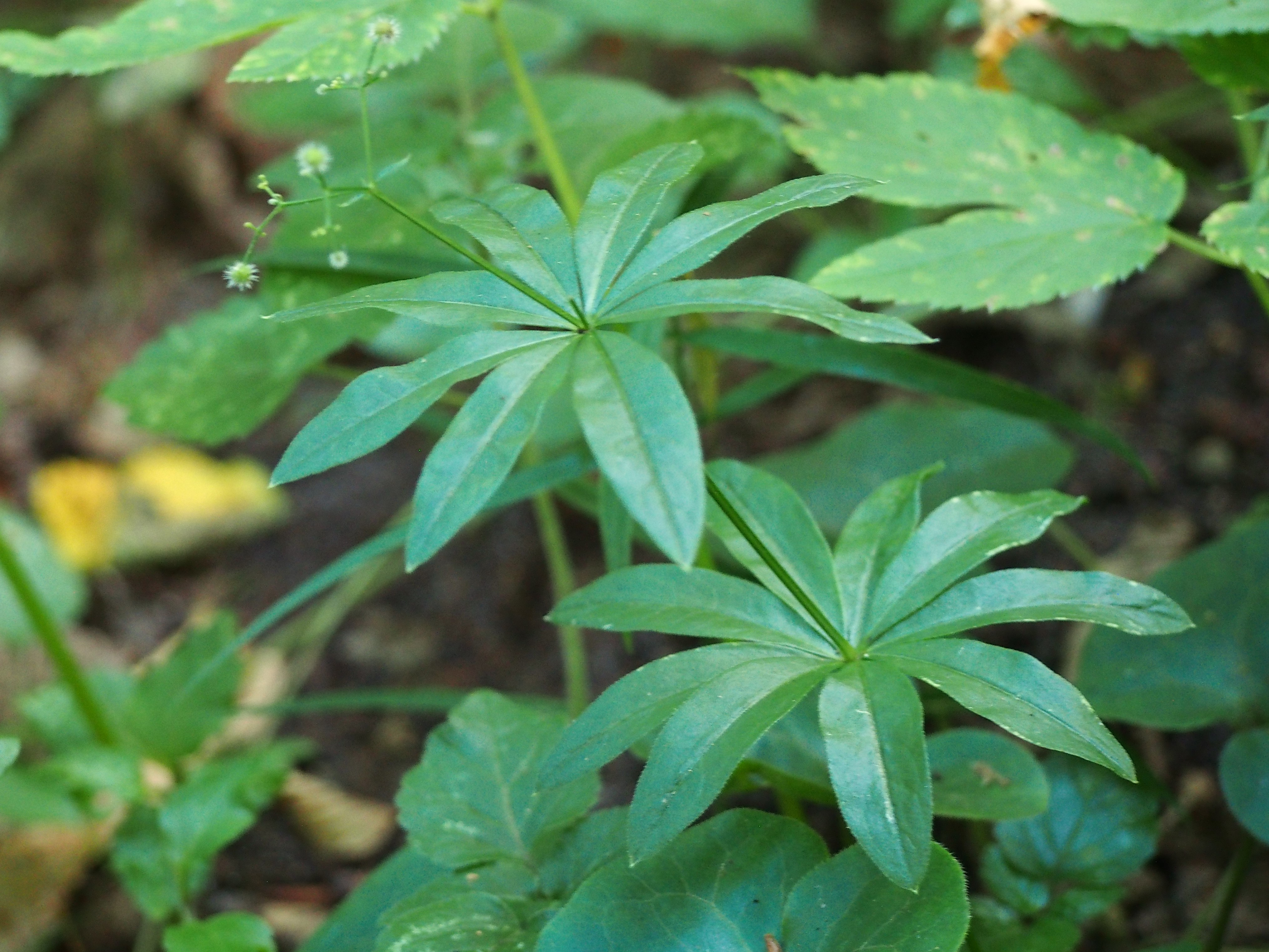
Foliage

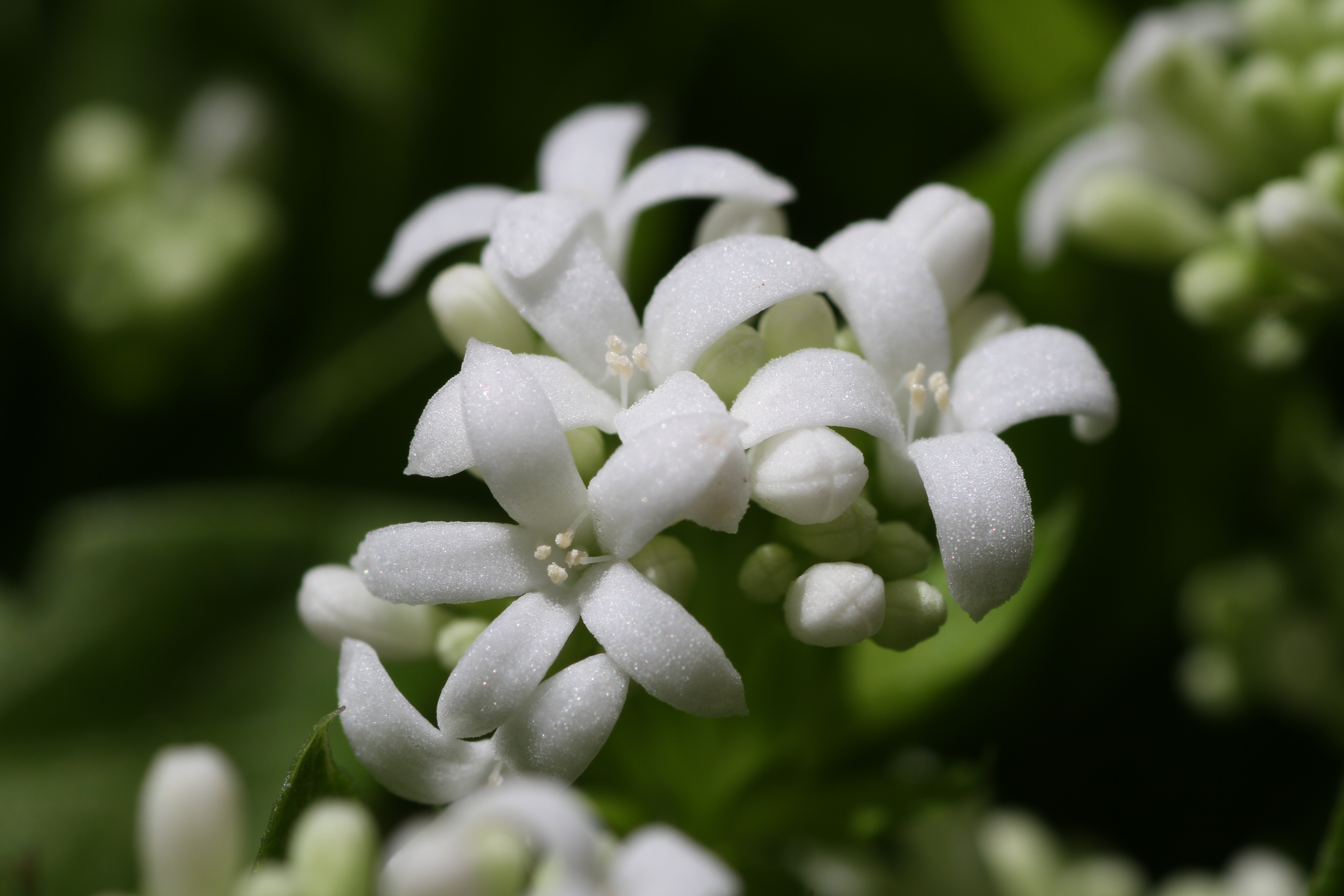
Flowers

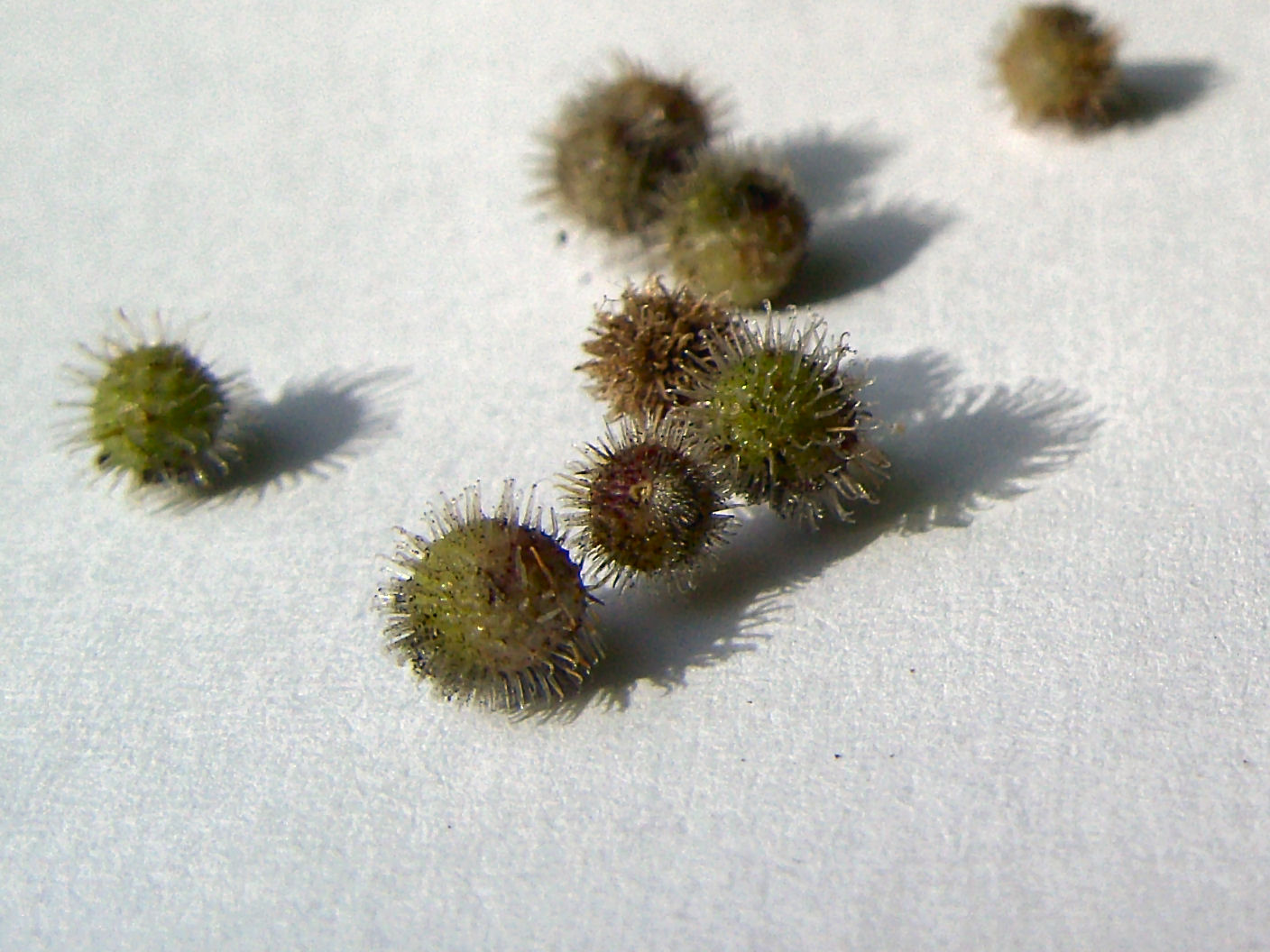
Fruit
