= Cold Duck =

American sparkling wine

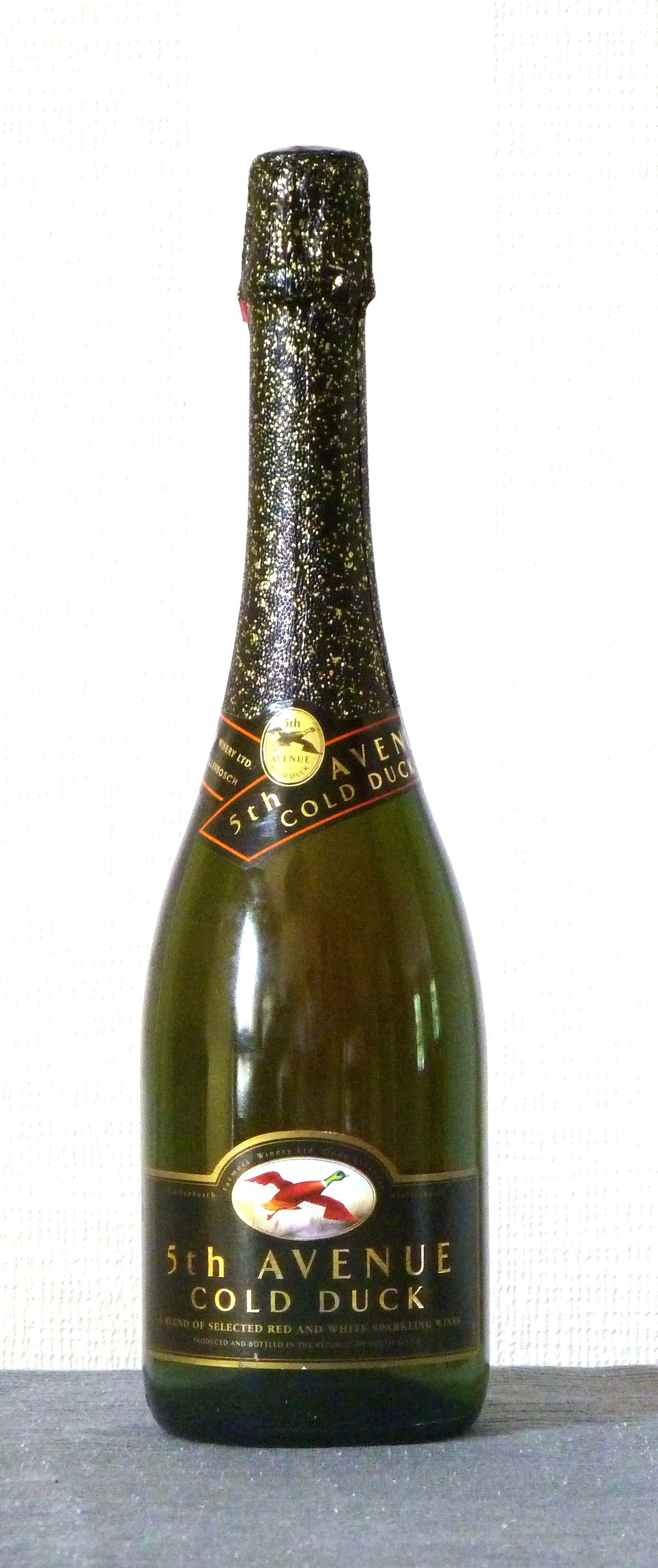
Cold Duck 5th Avenue

Cold Duck is a sparkling wine made in the United States.

== Origin ==
The recipe was based on a German legend involving Prince Clemens Wenceslaus of Saxony ordering the mixing of champagne with unfinished bottles of wine. The drink, as it evolved in Germany, became standardized as one part wine from the Mosel region, one part wine from the Rheinhessen region, and one part champagne, seasoned with lemons and balm mint. The wine produced was given the name Kaltes Ende ("cold end" in German), until it was altered to the similar-sounding term Kalte Ente meaning "cold duck".

Modern Cold Duck was invented in 1937 by Harold Borgman, the owner of Pontchartrain Wine Cellars in Detroit, Michigan. He simultaneously poured champagne and sparkling burgundy into a hollow-stem wine glass.

== Other wines ==
- In the US, the Michigan winery Bronte Champagnes and Wine was the first to bottle Cold Duck in the 1960s and 1970s. Bronte was sold to Tabor Hill Winery in 1984.
- During the early 1970s, the South Australian company Orlando Wines produced a sparkling red wine labelled 'Cold Duck'. Between 1971 and 1974, there were a number of trademark registrations, including Cold Turkey, Chicken, Gander, and Stork.
- In the early 1970s, Glenvale Vineyards and Montana Vineyards in New Zealand each produced wine under the name 'Cold Duck'.
- Stellenbosch Farmers' Winery in South Africa now produces 'Fifth Avenue Cold Duck', also a sweet sparkling red.
