= Gerhard Wolfram =

German playwright

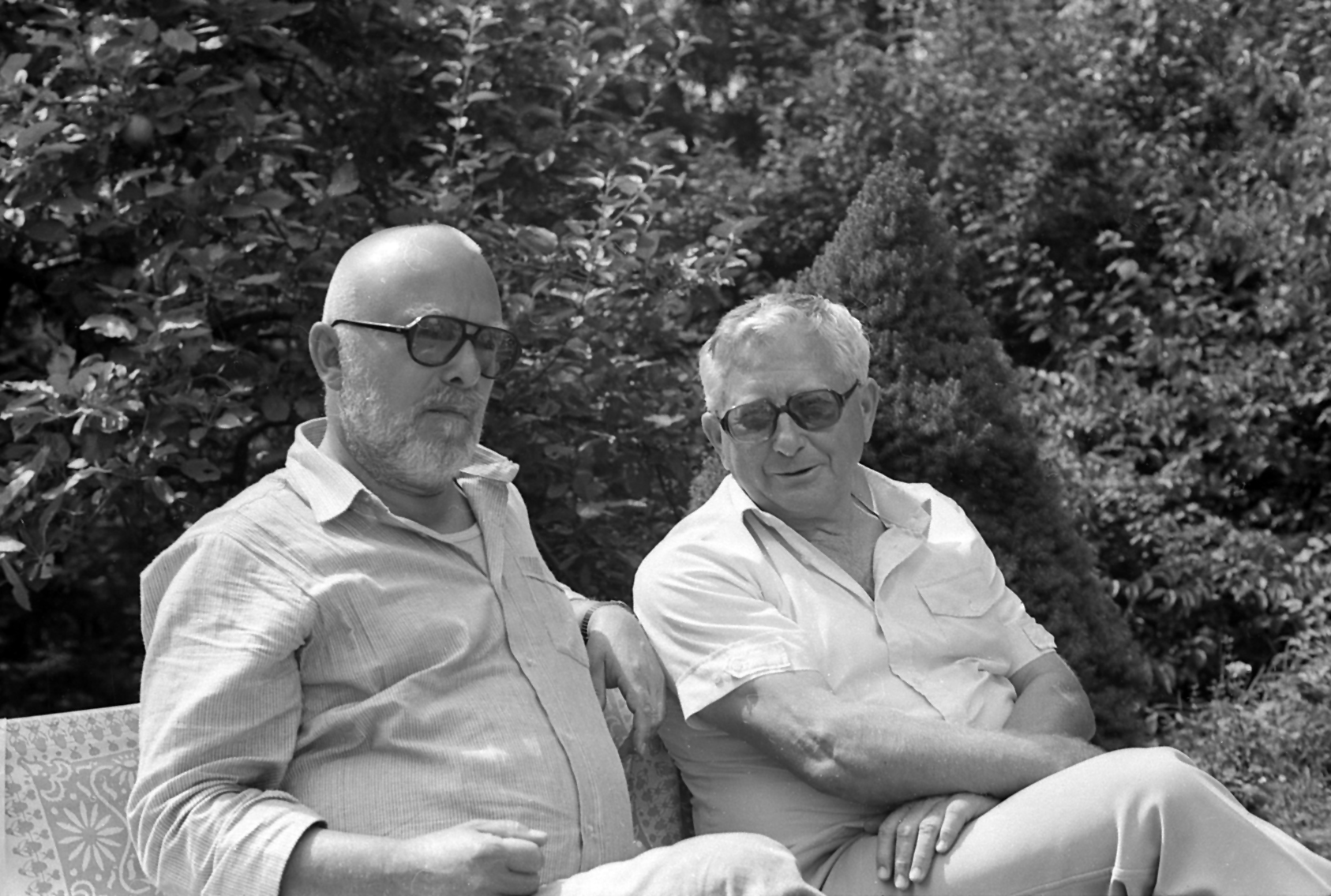
Gerhard Wolfram (right) with Horst Schönemann, Dresden, 1986

Gerhard Wolfram (15 June 1922 – 20 January 1991) was a German dramaturge, theatre director and theatre artistic director.

== Life ==
Born in Naumburg, Wolfram began training as an actor in Dresden during the Second World War. He was a member of the Hitler Youth and joined the NSDAP in 1940. He received his first theatre contract as an actor, dramaturge and director in 1945 at the Stadttheater Köthen. From 1946 to 1948, he worked as a consultant, director and dramaturge for Landessender Halle and Mitteldeutscher Rundfunk.

In 1948/49, he was a director and actor at the Volksbühne Leipzig. From 1949 to 1951, Wolfram acted as head of department and literary editor at Berliner Rundfunk. In the formalism controversy he came under criticism from the Soviet occupying power, but Bertolt Brecht placed himself protectively before him. From 1951 to 1952, he was employed at the DEFA dubbing studio, and from 1952 to 1953 he worked as an editor at the Tägliche Rundschau in Berlin.

From 1953 to 1965, he was chief dramaturge at Berlin's Maxim Gorki Theater under Maxim Vallentin, later also deputy artistic director. From 1966 to 1972, he held the post of artistic director at the Halle Opera House. At the height of his success in Halle, he was given the directorship of the Deutsches Theater Berlin in 1972. Wolfram was artistic director there until 1982, when he was appointed artistic director of the Staatsschauspiel Dresden, where he worked until his retirement in October 1990.

Wolfram, a candidate for the Central Committee of the SED from 1971 to 1976, a member of SED district leaderships, the central executive board of the art union and the presidium of the theatre association of the GDR, strove above all to implement socialist contemporary drama. He placed lived socialism at the centre and enforced the performance of difficult contemporary texts such as Hermann Kant's novel Die Aula and the world premieres of Passage and Ritter der Tafelrunde by Christoph Hein. Classics such as Goethe's Faust and The Robbers were radically questioned. He is considered the discoverer of Alexander Lang, Kurt Böwe, Jutta Wachowiak, Wolfgang Engel and Christoph Schroth.

Wolfram was married to the actress Sabine Krug, who died in a car accident in 1969.

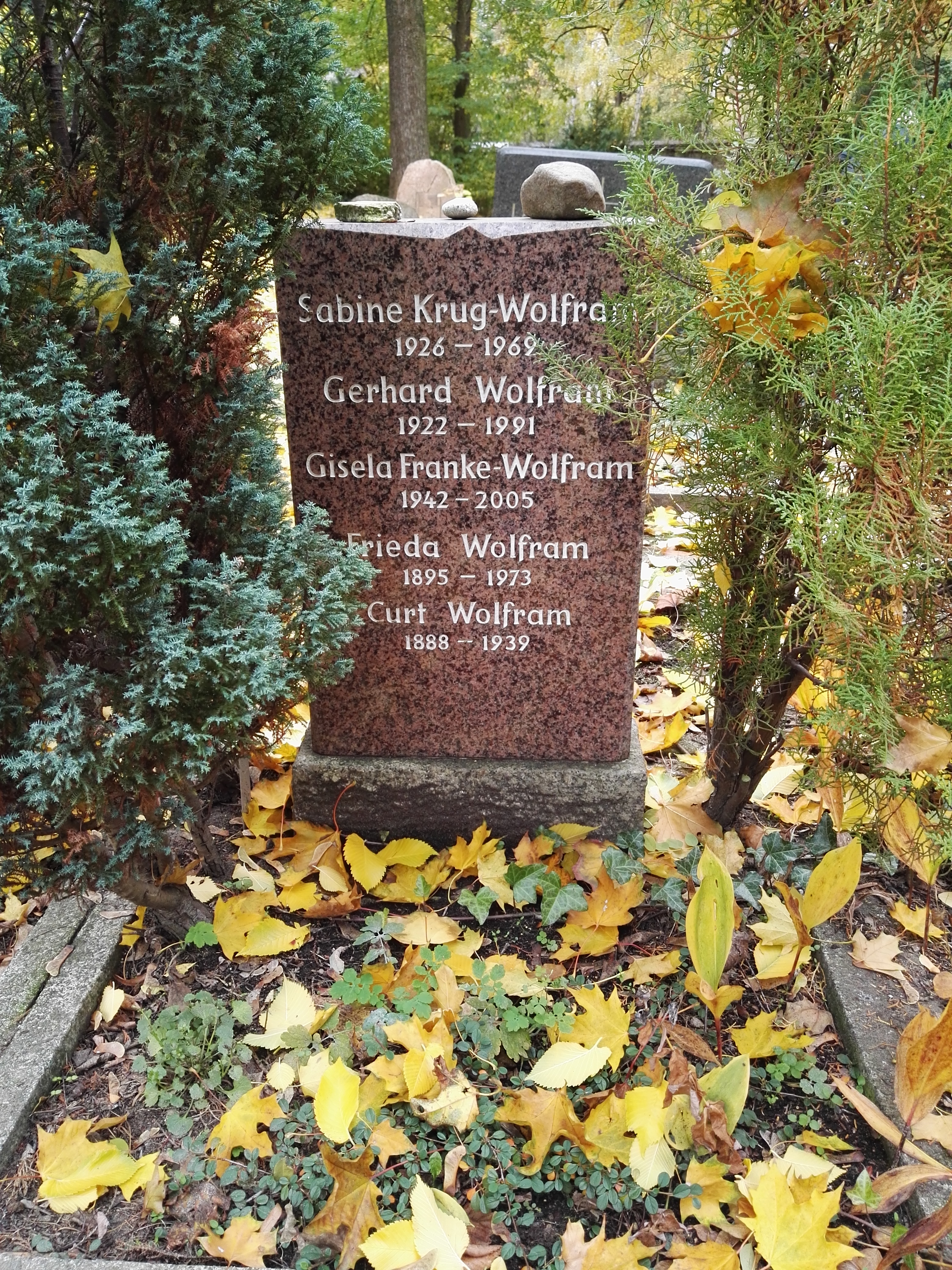
Grave

On 3 October 1990, the ensemble of the Staatsschauspiel Dresden appointed him its honorary member. Wolfram died in Berlin at the age of 68. His grave is located on the Französischer Friedhof in Berlin.
