= Horst Schulze =

German actor

Horst Schulze (26 April 1921 – 24 October 2018) was a German actor and opera singer. He was born in Dresden and died in Berlin at the age of 97.

== Filmography ==
Year	Title	Role	Notes
1958	Emilia Galotti	Graf Appiani	
1960	Hochmut kommt vor dem Knall	Uwe Angler	
1962	Freispruch mangels Beweises	Hanno Schmitt-Goslar	
1963	Jetzt und in der Stunde meines Todes	Georg Kirchner	
1963	Christine	Eugen Breuer	
1965	Karl Liebknecht - Solange Leben in mir ist.	Karl Liebknecht	
1967	Geschichten jener Nacht	Heinrich Huth	(segment "Die Prüfung")
1968	Mord am Montag	Dr - Ingo Vogelsang	
1968	Wir schützen was wir schaffen	Narrator	Voice
1968	Der Mord, der nie verjährt	Defense lawyer	
1969	Lebende Ware	Kurt Andreas Becher	
1969	Jungfer, Sie gefällt mir	Justizrat Walter	
1969	Weiße Wölfe	Collins P. Harrington	
1971	KLK Calling PTZ - The Red Orchestra	Dr. phil. Adam Kuckhoff	
1971	Osceola	William Raynes	
1972	Karl Lieknecht - Trotz alledem!	Karl Liebknecht	
1973	Nicht schummeln, Liebling	Erzähler	
1974	Elective Affinities	Mittler	
1975	Front bez flangov	General	
1975	Vybor tseli	Werner Heisenberg	
1979	Bis daß der Tod euch scheidet	Verkaufsstellenleiter	
1979	Für Mord kein Beweis	Zinn	
1980	Levins Mühle	Pfarrer Glinski	
1982	Märkische Forschungen	Lepetit	
1982	Berühmte Ärzte der Charité: Arzt in Uniform	Theodor Brugsch	
1984	Woman Doctors	Prosecutor Bitterim	
1990	Stalingrad	Erich Schulze	
1990	Abschiedsdisko	Johann Lebrecht Grauhut	
1991	Farssmann oder Zu Fuß in die Sackgasse	Dr. Falke	
1992	The Mystery of the Amber Room	Kobler	
1993	Wer zweimal lügt	Minister of justice	
