= Sun Seekers =

1972 film

- Directed by: Konrad Wolf
- Written by: Karl Georg Egel, Paul Wiens
- Produced by: Hans-Joachim Schoeppe
- Starring: Ulrike Germer
- Narrated by: Erwin Geschonneck
- Edited by: Christa Wernicke
- Music by: Joachim Werzlau
- Production company: DEFA
- Distributed by: Progress Film
- Release date: 1 September 1972
- Running time: 114 minutes
- Country: East Germany
- Language: German

Sun Seekers (German: Sonnensucher) is an East German film, directed by Konrad Wolf during 1958. It was banned and subsequently released only in 1972.

== Plot ==
1950. After being arrested in a police raid, the two young prostitutes Lotte and Emmi are sent to the mines in Wismut. There, East Germans and Soviets work together to extract Uranium for the use of the USSR. Two men fall in love with Lotte: the director Beier, a former SS man who tries to compensate for his past with hard work, and the Soviet engineer Sergei, whose wife was murdered by the Germans in the war. In the meantime, Jupp König, a veteran communist whom Emmi once harbored from the Gestapo, leads the miners as they attempt to replace their harsh and incompetent party boss, Weihrauch. Eventually, König is given Weihrauch's office. Lotte marries Beier, although she later realizes that she loves Sergei. When her husband is badly injured in an accident, he confides to the Soviet engineer that soldiers from his battalion murdered the latter's wife; Sergei replies that he knew it all along. Lotte and her baby son leave the mines and return to Berlin.

== Production ==
Konrad Wolf conceived the film during the early stage of the Khrushchev Thaw, when the political climate seemed to be liberalizing. The script was inspired by the real conditions of Wismut: thousands of prostitutes were arrested and forced to work in the mines during the late 1940s, while many other miners were former servicemen of the Wehrmacht, the SS or ex-members of the Nazi Party.

The film was intended to be ready for release already in 1958, but the DEFA Commission and functionaries in the Ministry of Culture disapproved of the negative portrayal of party boss Weihrauch and the less than pristine conduct of the workers. The film's supporters pointed out its committed Socialist-Realist narrative, its positive depiction of Soviet-German cooperation and its artistic merits; actor Erwin Geschonneck used his influence to promote it. On 24 June 1959, after many deliberations, Sun Seekers was shown to the entire Politburo, including Walter Ulbricht. Although they requested to make several alterations, the members praised the film. It was authorized to be released on 5 October.

Very shortly before it was to be released, the Soviet embassy in Berlin intervened and demanded to ban the film. While the exact details of the request are unknown, the Soviets were worried that presenting a Uranium mine and its contribution to the nuclear arms race - in the film, the main motivation of the miners was to insure peace by breaking the American monopoly on atomic weapons - would undermine their position in the diplomatic struggle against the West. Although a publicity campaign took place in the months before, the film was denied release. On 5 October, a small article in Neues Deutschland declared that the producers decided to withdraw Sun Seekers.

The ban was seen as an achievement for the film's opponents in the Ministry of Culture, who viewed it as overly liberal. Mira and Antonin Liehm wrote that many interpreted it as caused by an intervention of those officials, rather than only of the Soviets. According to Dagmar Schittly, East German directors were strongly influenced by the picture's withdrawal, and avoided presenting any "real conflict" in their films. In 1972, after Erich Honecker rose to power, Wolf convinced him to allow the picture in cinemas.

== Reception ==
In 1975, Wolf received the Society for German–Soviet Friendship's Art Prize, in recognition of his work on I Was Nineteen and Sun Seekers.

Seán Allan and John Sandford wrote that the film imported a "gold rush town" into East Germany, and was in many ways reminiscent of classical Westerners, including "the saloon-fight scenes." Bruce Arthur Murray and Chris Wickham commented that "it might have been one of DEFA's most important films - had it been allowed to prove itself." Anke Pinkert also noted a feminist agenda, common in East German cinema, with the lone woman Lutz as the chief protagonist.

Stephen Brockmann wrote that the picture's main motif was the sun - denied to the miners, working underground, and often hidden by smoke and soot. While the sun alternatively served as an allegory to the Uranium in the earth or to the workers' own elusive personal happiness, Brockmann stated that above all it symbolized the promised, Utopian society which communism sought to establish, and for which the miners had to toil hard in the conditions of first post-war years.
