= Lotte Meyer =

German stage and screen actress

Lotte Meyer (22 February 1909 - 7 June 1991) was a German stage and screen actress.

== Biography ==
Lotte Meyer was born in Bremen. She was born into a theatre family. During the nineteenth century her grandparents had run their own theatre company based in Merseburg, and which had toured across Germany, Russia, Austria and Switzerland. He mother, born Fanny Musäus, was a stage actress who had learnt her profession from her own parents. Alfred Meyer, Lotte Meyer's father, was a stage actor and comedian. Preparing to follow in the family tradition, she took acting lessons from Alice Verden at the Dresden State Theatre (Staatstheater).

Meyer was just 19 when she made her stage debut, playing "Lucy", the daughter of the police chief, in Leopold Jessner's production of The Threepenny Opera at Chemnitz. After that she had a successful stage career at the Dresden State Theatre (Staatstheater) between 1930 and 1935. Her sons Christoph and Peter were born in 1937 and 1940: she took a break from her stage work till 1945. Sources are silent about Mr. Schroth, the boys' father. After Lotte Meyer returned to the stage in 1945, her two sons shared their mother's itinerant theatrical lifestyle as they grew up.

Returning to the stage in 1945 she became part of the group around Erich Ponto, supporting his efforts to rebuild the "Staatsschauspiel" theatre in Dresden and resume its theatrical traditions. She also appeared at the city's newly founded "Komödienhaus" (loosely, "Comedy Theatre"). The central third of Germany, including Dresden, had ended the war administered as the Soviet occupation zone, to be relaunched in October 1949 as the Soviet-sponsored German Democratic Republic (East Germany). It was in East Germany that Lotte Meyer now built her career. Towards the end of the 1940s she began to travel around more (always within East Germany), appearing at theatres in Stralsund, Schwerin and then, via Eisenach, joining the Berlin-based Berliner Ensemble theatre company. Here she worked with Bertolt Brecht, a convinced Marxist who remained an iconic figure for the political left even if he was by now becoming a thorn in the side of the "Marxist" East German Politburo. For Meyer, work with Brecht was a constant learning opportunity.

Later she appeared at Erfurt, at the Theatre of the Young Generation in Dresden, the (East) German National Theatre in Weimar and at the Maxim Gorki Theatre in Berlin. In 1951, while Brecht was still very much alive, she took the lead as "Pelagea Vlassova" in Die Mutter ("The Mother") in the playwright's own production at the "Deutsches Theater". Other roles for which Meyer is remembered include that of "Lyubov Ranevskaya", the lynch pin character in The Cherry Orchard, Mrs. Alving in Ibsen's Ghosts and the title role in Helmut Baierl's "Mrs. Flinz". There were many more major character roles, generally from the more serious end of the theatrical canon.

Lotte Meyer returned to Dresden in 1967, meaning that her career had both its beginnings and its endings at the Dresden State Theatre (Staatstheater). This was also where her father had enjoyed his greatest comedic stage triumphs. She remained closely involved with the Dresden theatre till shortly before her death. She was much loved by comrade thespians, and during the immediate run-up to the changes which heralded the beginnings of a democratic East German state and then, half a year later, reunification, Meyer's apartment was used as a meeting point for many members of the "Dresden ensemble" community. Her home was also the scene of various round-table-style meetings, discussing art, politics and the methodologies of the theatrical profession, with a focus on how the situation in East Germany might be changed. Participants included Meyer's own grandchildren and frequently also took place in the presence of her most important friend, the Dresden artist Christoph Wetzel.

Her stage appearances during this later stage in her career tended still to focus on "character roles" such as Marthe Bull ("Mother") in Kleist's The Broken Jug. It was only towards the very end of her career that Meyer took on some significant film roles, notably in "Die gestundete Zeit" (loosely, "Time deferred"), a film for television directed in 1989 by Bernd Böhlich. She also appeared two years later in Böhlich's "Kein Wort Einsamkeit" (loosely, "Not a word about loneliness"), another television. Her final film appearance came only in late 1991 or early 1992, by which time she had died. This time she featured in Ula Stöckl rendition of "Das alte Lied" ("The Old Song").

Lotte Meyer died in Dresden. Her ashes were laid to rest at the city's Urnenhain Tolkewitz garden of rest.

== Awards (selection) ==
- Verdienstmedaille der DDR (loosely, "East German Medal for Distinguished Service")
- 1979 Martin-Andersen-Nexö-Kunstpreis (Martin Andersen Nexö Arts Prize) for a lifetime's work from the City of Dresden
