= Paul Wiens =

German poet

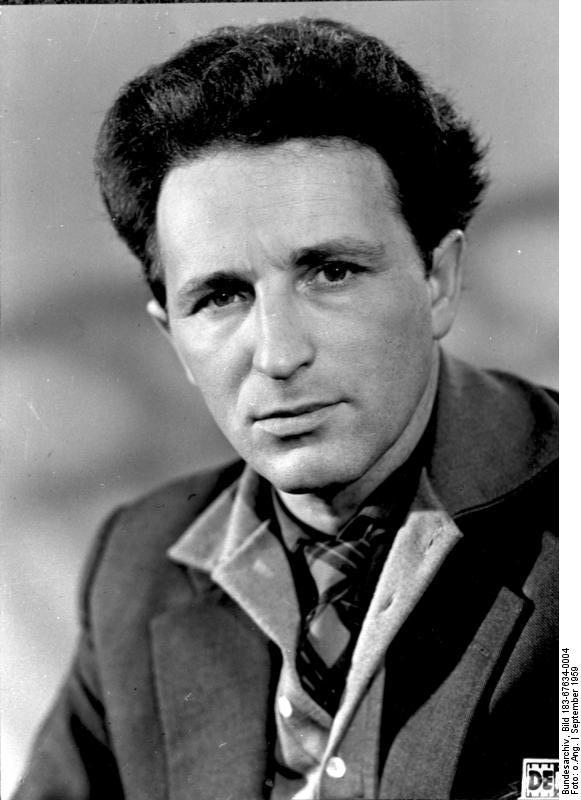
Paul Wiens (1959)

Paul Wiens (17 August 1922 – 6 April 1982) was a German poet, translator and author of radio plays and screenplays in the German Democratic Republic.

== Life ==
Wiens was born in Königsberg to a Jewish mother. However, he spent his childhood in Berlin until his mother emigrated to Switzerland in 1933 after the "Machtergreifung" by the National Socialists. After passing his school-leaving exams, he took up philosophy studies in Geneva and Lausanne. In 1943, Wiens was arrested in Vienna for Wehrkraftzersetzung and imprisoned in St. Pölten and in Arbeitserziehungslager Oberlanzendorf (1938-1954 Vienna, otherwise Lower Austria) until the end of the war.

After the end of the Second World War, he returned to Berlin in 1947 via Weimar, where he worked as an editor and translation editor at Aufbau-Verlag until 1950. Along the way, he published his first poems and youth songs (Begeistert von Berlin, 1952). From 1952 onwards, he was a freelance writer and wrote mainly poetry and texts for mass songs. Wiens also wrote screenplays, for example for Frank Vogel's film ... und deine Liebe auch (1962), which justifies the Berlin Wall, and for Konrad Wolf's Sonnensucher (1958). The film deals with the production battles in the uranium mining of Soviet-German Joint Stock Company Wismut and, because of its thematic connection to the production of nuclear weapons, was not premiered until 1972 due to a veto by the Soviet Union at the time. Furthermore, he translated works by Pablo Neruda, Vladimir Mayakovsky, Nazim Hikmet and others into German. Wiens was co-editor of the poetry series "Antwortet uns" (Answer us) and editor-in-chief of the influential literary magazine Sinn und Form in 1982 until his death in Berlin at the age of 59.

Wiens was temporarily vice-president of the Cultural Association of the GDR and from 1961 to 1969 chairman of the Berlin district association of the writers' association of the GDR. In 1964, he became a member of the German P.E.N. Centre East and was a member of its executive committee from 1980.

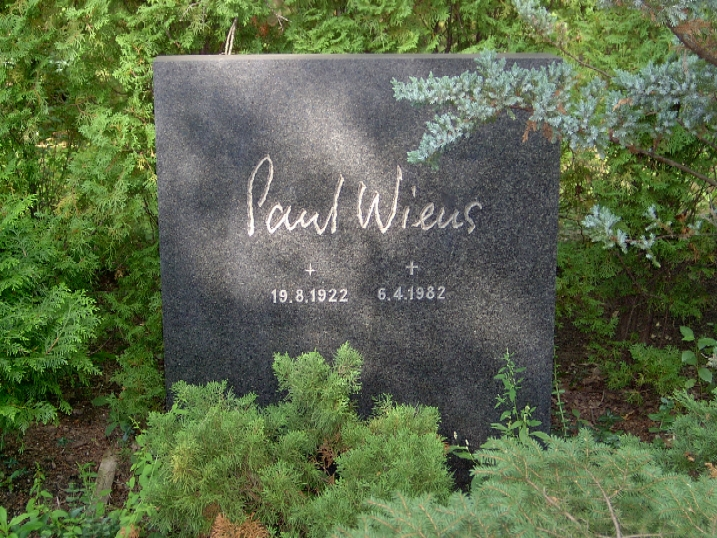
Grave of Paul Wiens

Wiens was buried in the artists' section of Berlin's Zentralfriedhof Friedrichsfelde. His estate is in the literary archive of the Academy of Arts, Berlin.

Wiens' daughter Maja Wiens from his first marriage to Erika Lautenschlager (1921-1989) is also a writer (novel Traumgrenzen, Berlin: Neues Leben 1983 / screenplay Versteckte Fallen DEFA 1991).

== Collaborator with the State Security ==
In the 1960s, Wiens worked as a "social informant" with the Stasi. At the end of the 1960s, he interrupted this activity for a few years because of "ideological stomach ache", then continued it from 1972 until his death as an unofficial collaborator. He also repeatedly worked for the Soviet KGB. Wiens "handed over private letters addressed to him, provided detailed denunciatory information on writers from East and West and reported on international writers' meetings in the Soviet Union, Hungary and Yugoslavia", according to Joachim Walther in his standard work Sicherungsbereich Literatur. He provided reports on his GDR colleagues Jurek Becker, Wolf Biermann, Franz Fühmann, Stefan Heym, Sarah Kirsch, Heiner Müller, Ulrich Plenzdorf and Erwin Strittmatter, among others, the Western writers Heinrich Böll, Günter Grass, and Andrei Sakharov, as well as his third wife, the writer Irmtraud Morgner, who divorced him in 1977. He received several state awards for his informer activities.

== Filmography ==
- 1953: Das kleine und das große Glück
- 1955: Einmal ist keinmal
- 1956: Genesung
- 1958: Meister Zacharias und seine acht goldenen Zeiger
- 1958: Das Lied der Matrosen
- 1960: Leute mit Flügeln
- 1961: Der Mann mit dem Objektiv
- 1962: … und deine Liebe auch
- 1972: Sonnensucher
- 1978: Matrosen in Berlin (Liedtexte)

== Radio play ==
- 1978: Isaak Babel: Maria (as narrator) – director: Joachim Staritz (radio play – Rundfunk der DDR)

== Awards ==
- 1952: Goethe-Preis der Stadt Berlin
- 1959: Nationalpreis der DDR
- 1962: Heinrich-Heine-Preis des Ministeriums für Kultur der DDR
- 1973: Verdienstmedaille der NVA in Bronze
- 1974: Verdienstmedaille der NVA in Silber
- 1976: Johannes-R.-Becher-Medaille
- 1973: Verdienstmedaille der NVA in Gold
- 1977: Vaterländischer Verdienstorden in Bronze
- 1979: Vaterländischer Verdienstorden in Gold
- 1980: Medal Brotherhood in Arms in Bronze
