= Günther Deicke =

German poet and journalist (1922–2006)

Günther Deicke (21 October 1922 – 14 June 2006) was a German poet and journalist.

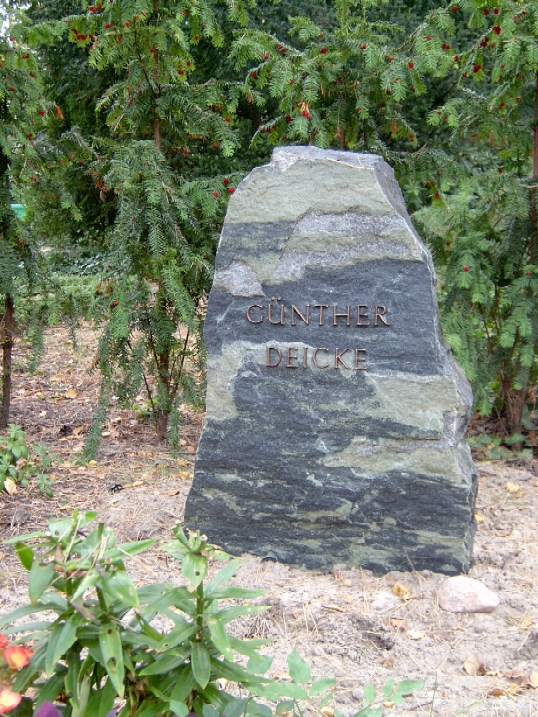
Günther Deicke's grave at Friedhof Pankow III in Berlin

== Life ==
Born in Hildburghausen, in 1940 Deicke joined the NSDAP. Under the Nazi regime he was Hitler Youth Führer. From 1941 to 1945, he was deployed as a sailor in World War II.

In 1947, he became cultural editor in Weimar, and from 1951 to 1952 literary editor in Berlin. From 1951 to 1958, he worked for the literary magazine neue deutsche literatur. From 1959 to 1970, he again worked as a publishing house editor. Deicke worked as an author with the leading GDR publishers and magazines (Aufbau-Verlag, Verlag der Nation, Verlag Volk und Welt, Sinn und Form). He was also active as a translator of works by Boris Pasternak, Mihai Eminescu, Ivan Vazov, Lőrinc Szabó, Vojtech Mihálik.

He has been a freelance writer since 1970 and has published numerous volumes of poetry, such as Du und Dein Land und die Liebe sowie Die Wolken..

Deicke was a member of the German Academy of Sciences at Berlin and the PEN Centre Germany. In 1964, he received the Heinrich Heine Prize and the Attila József plaque of the Hungarian P.E.N. Centre; in 1970, the National Prize of the GDR. He received the Berliner Zeitung Critics' Prize in 1968 and 1977, and the Patriotic Order of Merit in silver in 1982. In 1987, he was honoured with the Order of Star of People's Friendship in Silver. Deicke was an active member of the German-Hungarian Society and an honorary member of the Hungarian Writers' Association.

Deicke died at the age of 83 during a spa stay in Mariánské Lázně and is buried at Cemetery Pankow III. His grave is a private grave in the Honour Grove area.

== Quotes ==
- Kampf und Widersprüche sind stärkere Farben als Frieden und Zuversicht.
- War ich ein Faschist gewesen? Ja.

== Work ==
- 1954 Liebe in unseren Tagen (Poetry).
- 1959 Taum vom glücklichen Jahr (Poetry).
- 1960 Du und Dein Land und die Liebe.
- 1965 Die Wolken (Poetry).
- 1966 Esther (opera libretto). Premiere: Deutsche Staatsoper Berlin.
- 1966 Reiter der Nacht (opera libretto).
- 1968 Reineke Fuchs opera libretto).
- 1972 Ortsbestimmung (Poetry).
- 1973 Poesiealbum 70 (Poetry).
- 1975 Dass der Mensch ein Mensch sei, ein poetische Dialog in Bild und Wort. With Michail Trachmann.
- 1981 Das Chagrinleder (opera libretto for Fritz Geißler).
- 2011 Daheim. Gedichte aus dem Nachlaß anlässlich des fünften Todestages am 14. Juni 2011. Published by the Deutsch-Ungarischen Gesellschaft (DUG) in Berlin. With three translations into Hungarian by Sándor Tatár and an enclosed original lithograph by Volker Scharnefsky. DUG, Berlin 2011, ISBN 978-3-9809551-0-2 (text partly in German, partly in Hungarian).

=== Anthologies and literary journals ===
- Ralph Grüneberger (ed.)/Gesellschaft für zeitgenössische Lyrik: Poesiealbum neu. Editions 1/2010, 2/2010.
