= Erika Dunkelmann =

German actress (1913–2000)

- Born: 17 November 1913; Rostock, German Empire
- Died: 14 February 2000 (aged 86); Tessin, Germany
- Occupation: Actress
- Years active: 1954–1980 (film & TV)

Erika Dunkelmann (17 November 1913 – 14 February 2000) was a German film and television actress. Based in East Germany, she worked regularly for the state-controlled DEFA studios.

== Selected filmography ==
- Das geheimnisvolle Wrack (1954)
- Stärker als die Nacht (1954)
- Ernst Thälmann (1954)
- A Berlin Romance (1956)
- Bärenburger Schnurre (1957)
- Old Barge, Young Love (1957)
- Berlin, Schoenhauser Corner (1957)
- New Year's Eve Punch (1960)

== Bibliography ==
- Cowie, Peter & Elley, Derek. World Filmography: 1967. FDUP, 1977.
