= Günter Reisch =

German film director and screenwriter

- Born: 24 November 1927; Berlin, Germany
- Died: 24 February 2014 (aged 86); Berlin, Germany
- Occupations: Film director, screenwriter
- Years active: 1951–1990

Günter Reisch (24 November 1927 – 24 February 2014) was a German film director and screenwriter. He served in the German Army during the last stage of World War II. On 20 April 1944 he became a member of the Nazi Party. After his release from an American POW camp, he returned to Potsdam in the Soviet occupation zone and joined the Free German Youth and later the Socialist Unity Party of Germany. He started working with theater and film and became one of East Germany's most prominent film makers. He made 20 films, including the two Karl Liebknecht films. His 1978 film Anton the Magician was entered into the 11th Moscow International Film Festival.

== Selected filmography ==
- The Sailor's Song (1958)
- New Year's Eve Punch (1960)
- Ach du fröhliche... (1962)
- Anton the Magician (1978)
- The Fiancee (1979)
