= May wine =

German aromatized wine served in spring

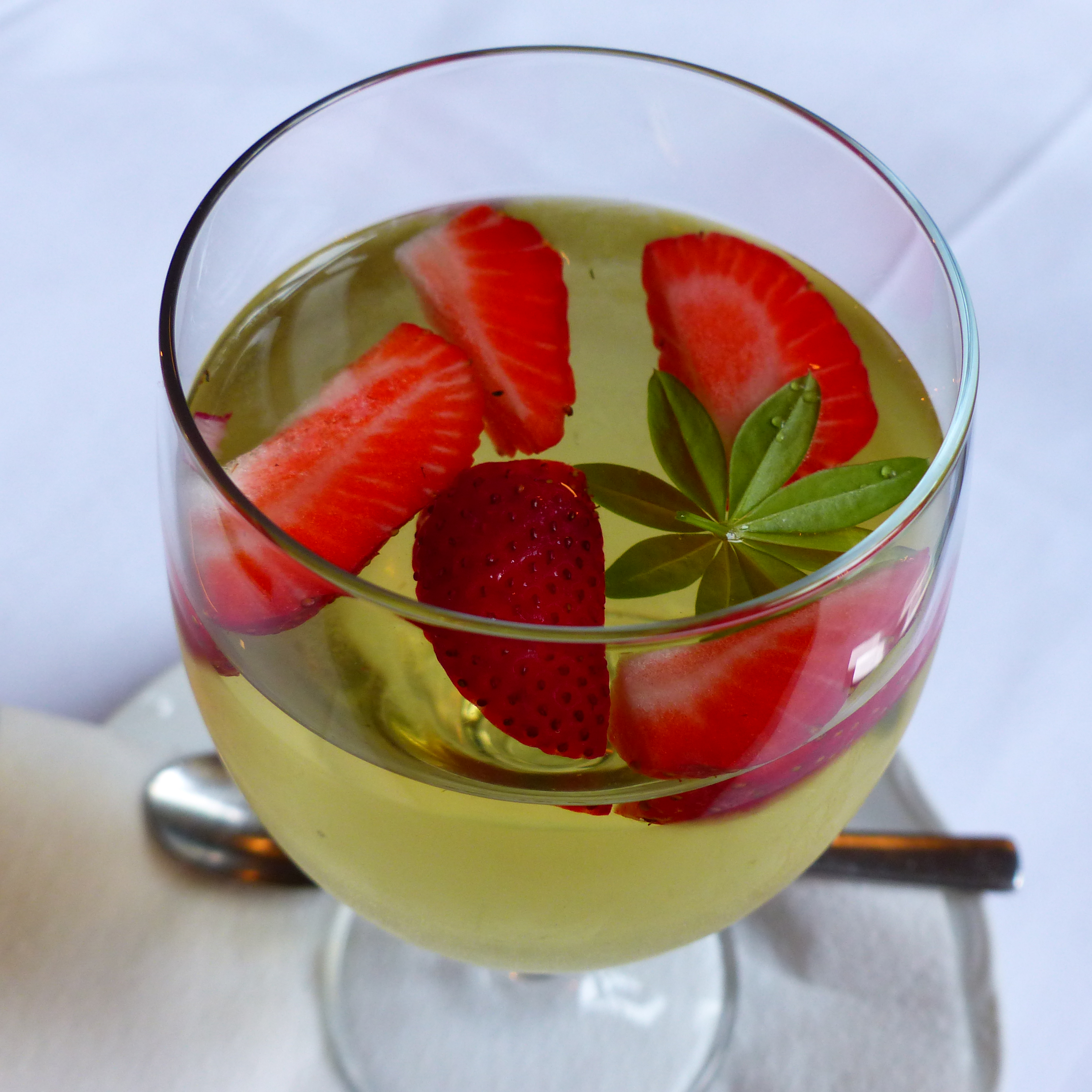
May wine with strawberries and a sprig of woodruff

May wine, also known as Maitrank, Maiwein, Maibowle and Waldmeisterbowle, is an aromatized wine popular in Germany, sometimes made into a punch. May wine is served in the spring, traditionally on the May Day holiday. The base is made by steeping the fragrant creeping herb sweet woodruff (Galium odoratum, sometimes called Asperula odorata, known in Germany as Waldmeister) that grows in the forests of Northern Europe in a white German wine. It is the specialty of the town of Arlon, in the south of Belgium.

== Ingredients ==
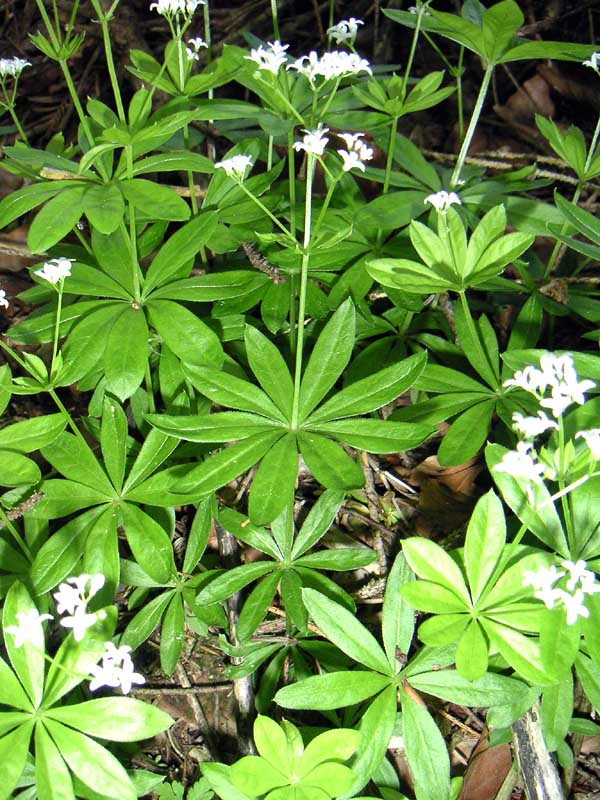
Galium odoratum (woodruff) is a principal ingredient in the base of May wine

The Council of the European Communities legally defines Maiwein as:

[A]n aromatized drink obtained from wine with added Asperula odorata [Galium odoratum] plants or extracts thereof so as to ensure a predominant taste of Asperula odorata.

To make a punch (Maibowle, May punch) ingredients such as brandy, sparkling wine (or carbonated water) and sugar may also be added to May wine.

Since strawberries are in season at that time of year, they are often floated in the drink.

== Production ==
A variation might include strawberry flavoring or fermentation techniques to make it lightly sparkling. Commercial May wine produced in Germany has been made with artificial flavoring and coloring agents since the 1980s.

May wine is produced in German cultural regions of the United States such as Frankenmuth, Michigan.

== See also ==
- Sangria
