= Sophie Liebknecht =

German politician (1884–1964)

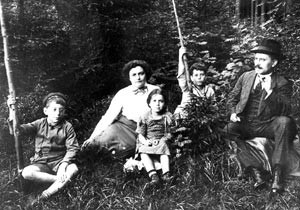
Sophie Liebknecht and husband Karl Liebknecht with Karl's children from his first marriage, 1913.

Sophie Liebknecht (née Ryss; 18 January 1884 – 11 November 1964) was a Russian-born German socialist and feminist. She was the second wife of Karl Liebknecht, who had three children from his first marriage to Julia Liebknecht.

Born in Rostov-on-Don, Sophie was educated in Imperial Germany, where she became a lecturer and art historian. In 1912 she married the Marxist thinker and soon-to-be revolutionary leader Karl Liebknecht. Originally a member of the German Social Democratic Party (SPD), she followed her husband when he founded the Communist Party of Germany in 1918. Karl Liebknecht was murdered on January 15, 1919, after the failed Spartacist uprising. Sophie moved to London, and later returning to Germany during the Weimar period. The members of the Liebknecht family were alarmed by the rise of the Nazi Party in the 1930s, and, fearing for their lives under the fascist regime established by Adolf Hitler, chose to emigrate during this era. The Russian-born Sophie left for the Soviet Union in 1934 and settled in Moscow, where she lived for the remaining decades of her life.

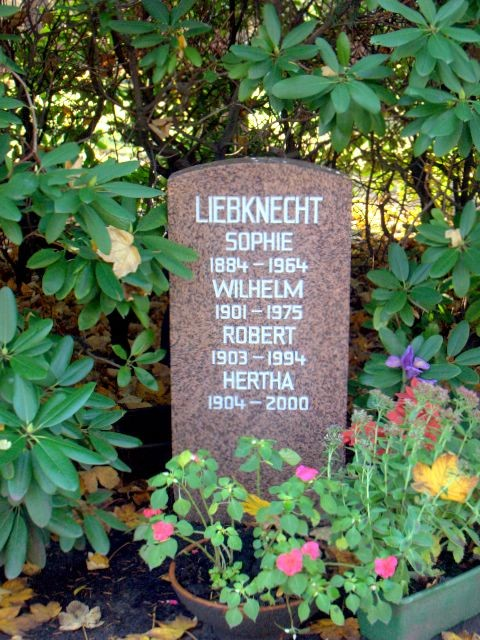
Tomb stone of Sophie Liebknecht and the Liebknecht family.

Her funeral in 1964 was attended by Robert and Wilhelm, Sophie Liebknecht's stepsons from Karl's first marriage. The Soviet government arranged a public ceremony and an honor guard.

Much of her correspondence with Rosa Luxemburg has been published.
