= Deaths in August 1981 =

The following is a list of notable deaths in August 1981.

Entries for each day are listed alphabetically by surname. A typical entry lists information in the following sequence:

- Name, age, country of citizenship at birth, subsequent country of citizenship (if applicable), reason for notability, cause of death (if known), and reference.

== August 1981 ==
=== 1 ===
- Paddy Chayefsky, 58, American playwright, screenwriter and novelist, he is the only person to have won three solo Academy Awards for writing both Adapted and Original screenplays, he was one of the most renowned dramatists of the Golden Age of Television, known for writing slice of life tales in the naturalist tradition, cancer
- Álvaro de Laiglesia, 58, Spanish novelist and humorist, he spend several years as an expatriate in Havana, Cuba as a staff member of the newspaper Diario de la Marina, cerebral thrombosis while visiting his wife's family in Manchester, England.
- Kelly Gordon, 48, American singer, songwriter, and record producer, he served as the producer of Bobbie Gentry's hit song Ode to Billie Joe (1967) and the co-writer of Marion Montgomery's That's Life (1963), he wrote songs for (among others) The Temptations, Nichelle Nichols, Aretha Franklin, and James Brown, prostate cancer
- Kevin Lynch, 25, Irish republican, he was a member of the Irish National Liberation Army (INLA), he was convicted for stealing shotguns, taking part in a punishment shooting and conspiring to take arms from the security forces, he died while taking part in the 1981 Irish hunger strike, he had starved himself to death for 71 days

=== 2 ===
- Delfo Cabrera, 62, Argentine athlete, winner of the marathon race at the 1948 Summer Olympics, killed in a car accident
- Stefanie Clausen, 81, Danish diver, at the 1920 Summer Olympics, she won the gold medal in the 10 metre platform competition.
- Kieran Doherty, 25, Irish paramilitary member, volunteer in Belfast Brigade of the Provisional Irish Republican Army (IRA), he was arrested by Royal Ulster Constabulary (RUC) following a car chase and a car hijacking, he died while taking part in the 1981 Irish hunger strike, he had starved himself to death for 73 days

=== 4 ===
- Melvyn Douglas, 80, Latvian-American actor, he served as a director of the Arts Council in the Office of Civilian Defense during World War II, and as a major in the Special Services Entertainment Production Unit of the United States Army, he twice won the Academy Award for Best Supporting Actor for his roles as Homer Bannon in the contemporary Western film Hud (1963) and Benjamin Rand in the satirical comedy-drama Being There (1979), pneumonia and cardiac complications

=== 8 ===
- Thomas McElwee, 23, Irish paramilitary member, he was a Provisional Irish Republican Army (IRA) volunteer who participated in the 1981 hunger strike, he died after 62 days on hunger strike.
- George J. Schaefer, 92, American film producer and studio executive, he served terms as the general manager of Paramount Pictures, the vice president and chief executive officer of United Artists, and the president of RKO Pictures, in 1939, Schaefer controversially offered to the inexperienced film director Orson Welles what generally is considered the greatest contract offered to a filmmaker, engaging Welles to write, produce, direct and perform in two pictures,; the contract subordinated the studio's financial interests to Welles's creative control, and broke precedent by granting to Welles the final cut of both films. The agreement was bitterly resented by the Hollywood studios and persistently mocked in the trade press.

=== 10 ===
- Duško Popov, 69, Serbian intelligence agent, lawyer and businessman, he served as a double agent for MI6 during World War II, death after unspecified to unspecified "long illness", attributed to years of chain smoking and heavy drinking. Popov is considered one of the main inspirations for Ian Fleming's James Bond novels.

=== 12 ===
- Shirley Grey, 79, American actress, she was the leader of the eponymous theatrical troupe Shirley Grey Players in the late 1920s, and she had a film career in the 1930s, she spend the last decades of her life as a semi-recluse and eventually died in a convalescent home

=== 14 ===
- Karl Böhm, 86, Austrian conductor, he replaced Fritz Busch in the Dresden State Opera in 1934, his appointment was facilitated directly by Adolf Hitler, who obtained an early release for Böhm from his previous contract, in his new position, Böhm "poured forth rhetoric glorifying the Nazi regime and their cultural aims".

=== 16 ===
- Robert Krasker, 68, Egypt-born Australian cinematographer, he won the Academy Award for Best Cinematography (black-and-White) for his work on the film noir The Third Man (1949), a film noted for making extensive use of Dutch angle shots, to emphasize the main character's alienation in a foreign environment

=== 17 ===
- Giorgio Ferroni, 73, Italian film director, by the time of his last major film project in 1972, Ferroni was almost completely deaf and had to direct the film with the help of a hearing aid
- Dominick Napolitano, 51, American gangster and member of the American Mafia, caporegime in the Bonanno crime family, shot and killed by members of the Bonanno family, as Napolitano was blamed for a then-recent security breach

=== 18 ===
- Robert Russell Bennett, 87, American composer and arranger, he is primarily known for his orchestration of many well-known Broadway and Hollywood musicals by other composers, such as Irving Berlin, George Gershwin, Jerome Kern, Cole Porter, and Richard Rodgers, liver cancer
- Anita Loos, 93, American actress, novelist, playwright, and screenwriter, she started her screenwriting career in the 1910s, by selling scripts to both the Biograph and Lubin studios, between 1912 and 1915, she wrote 105 scripts, all but four of which were produced, she had written 200 scenarios before she ever visited a film studio, she gained literary success when she wrote the popular "Lorelei" stories for Harper's Bazaar, satires on the state of sexual relations that only vaguely alluded to sexual intimacy; the magazine's circulation quadrupled overnight, heart attack, while already hospitalized with a lung disease

=== 19 ===
- Jessie Matthews, 74, English actress, dancer, and singer, highly popular in the interwar period, the post-World War II audiences associated Matthews with a world of hectic pre-war luxury that was seen as obsolete in the austerity-era Britain, cancer

=== 20 ===
- Michael Devine, 27, Irish militant and Republican activist, he was arrested following an arms raid, and charged with the theft of rifles, shotguns and possession of 3,000 rounds of ammunition >he died while taking part in the 1981 Irish hunger strike, being the tenth and last of the hunger strikers to die.

=== 22 ===
- Glauber Rocha, 42, Brazilian film director, screenwriter, and actor, he was a leading figure of the Cinema Novo, he spend the last decade of his life in self-exile, evading potential arrest by the Brazilian military dictatorship, lung disease
- Kuniko Mukōda, 51, Japanese television writer and short story writer, in 1980, she won the 83rd Naoki Prize (1980上) for her short stories Hanano Namae, Kawauso and Inugoya, she was one of the victims of the aviation accident on Far Eastern Air Transport Flight 103

=== 23 ===
- Rolf Herricht, 53, East German comedian, he was briefly drafted as an anti-aircraft battery assistant for the Volkssturm in 1945, in 1953, he formed a new comedy duo with Hans-Joachim Preil, he was twice awarded with the Art Prize of the German Democratic Republic (in 1973 and 1977), death due to an on-stage heart attack while performing in the theatrical musical Kiss Me, Kate (1948)

=== 26 ===
- Roger Nash Baldwin, 97, American author, pacifist, and anti-communist, co-founder and executive director of the Civil Liberties Bureau (CLB), the National Civil Liberties Bureau, and the American Civil Liberties Union (ACLU) from 1917 until 1950, in the 1940s, he led the campaign to purge the ACLU of Communist Party members, heart failure

=== 27 ===
- Irmgard Bartenieff, 81, German-born American dance theorist, dancer, choreographer, physical therapist, and a leading pioneer of dance therapy, starting in 1968 at the Bellevue Hospital Center, her work involved cases of the control/restoration of movement patterns governed by the central nervous system rather than the treatment of peripheral problems in the affected muscles of polio patients, complications from Raynaud's disease.
- Peter Eckersley, 45, British television producer and writer, he was both a writer and a producer on the soap opera Coronation Street from 1962 until 1969, he served as the Head of Drama at Granada Television during the 1960s and the 1970s, cancer
- Joan Edwards, 62, American actress and singer-songwriter of the old-time radio era, she served as the female soloist of Your Hit Parade from 1941 until 1947, heart attack
- Valeri Kharlamov, 33, Basque-Russian ice hockey forward, he played for CSKA Moscow in the Soviet League from 1967 until his death in 1981, he played in eleven World Championships in total, capturing 8 gold medals, 2 silvers and 1 bronze, killed in a car accident (as a passenger), when the car collided with a truck

=== 28 ===
- Béla Guttmann, 82, Hungarian footballer and coach, he coached two dozen teams in ten countries from 1933 until 1974, and won two European Cups, and ten national championships.

=== 29 ===
- Lowell Thomas, 89, American travel writer, biographer, documentary filmmaker, and regular narrator of newsreels, he hosted the first television news broadcast in 1939 and the first regularly scheduled television news broadcast beginning on February 21, 1940, over W2XBS (now WNBC) in New York City

=== 30 ===
- Mohammad-Javad Bahonar, 47, Iranian theologian and politician, he briefly served as the prime minister of Iran in August 1981, assassinated, he was one of the victims in the 1981 Iranian Prime Minister's office bombing
- Vera-Ellen, 60, German-American dancer, actress, and singer, due to her "extremely thin" appearance, she was rumored to be suffering from an eating disorder or anorexia, ovarian cancer
- Mohammad-Ali Rajai, 48, Iranian politician, he served as the prime minister of Iran from 1980 until 1981, he briefly served as the president of Iran in August 1981, assassinated, he was one of the victims in the 1981 Iranian Prime Minister's office bombing
- Rita Webb, 77, English character actress, primarily known for comedy roles, she served as a stooge for Benny Hill in The Benny Hill Show, cancer

== Sources ==
- Acker, Ally (1991). Reel women: pioneers of the cinema 1896 to the present. London: Batsford. ISBN 0-7134-6960-9.
- Considine, Shaun (1994). Mad as hell: the life and work of Paddy Chayefsky (1st ed.). New York: Random House. ISBN 0679408924.
- Curti, Roberto (2017). Italian Gothic Horror Films, 1970–1979. McFarland. ISBN 978-1476629605.
- Loftis, Larry (2016). Into the Lion's Mouth: The True Story of Duško Popov. New York: Penguin. ISBN 978-0-425-28181-9.
- Martin, Lawrence (1990), The Red Machine: The Soviet Quest to Dominate Canada's Game, Toronto: Doubleday Canada, ISBN 0-385-25272-2
- Miller, Russell (2004). Codename Tricycle. London: Random House. ISBN 978-1-84413-088-7.
- Norman, Marc (2007). What Happens Next: A History of American Screenwriting. New York, N.Y: Harmony. ISBN 978-0-307-38339-6.
- Podnieks, Andrew, ed. (November 2013), 2014 IIHF Guide and Record Book, Toronto: Fenn/McClelland Stewart, ISBN 978-0771046391
- Raab, Selwyn. Five Families: The Rise, Decline, and Resurgence of America's Most Powerful Mafia Empires. New York: St. Martin Press, 2005. ISBN 978-0-312-30094-4
- Schmidt, Karl (June 1917). "The Handwriting on the Screen". Everybody's Magazine. 36: 622–23.
- Soren, David, Vera-Ellen: The Magic and the Mystery. Luminary Press, Baltimore, 2003. ISBN 1-88766-448-3.
- Jessie Matthews – A Biography, by Michael Thornton, Hart-Davis Publisher, 1974 (ISBN 0-246-10801-0)
