= Hands Up or I'll Shoot =

- Theatrical release poster
- Directed by: Hans-Joachim Kasprzik
- Written by: Rudi Strahl; Hans-Joachim Kasprzik
- Produced by: Erich Albrecht
- Starring: Rolf Herricht
- Cinematography: Lothar Gerber
- Edited by: Ursula Rudzki
- Music by: Günter Hauk
- Production company: DEFA
- Distributed by: Defa-Spektrum Filmverleih
- Release date: 2 July 2009
- Running time: 78 minutes
- Country: German Democratic Republic
- Language: German
- Budget: 1,680,000 East German Mark

Hands Up or I'll Shoot (German: Hände hoch oder ich schieße) is an East German crime comedy film directed by Hans-Joachim Kasprzik, who wrote the script along with Rudi Strahl. Rolf Herricht starred as officer Holms.

The picture was filmed in 1965, but in 1966 censors refused to allow it to be screened, and therefore post-production ceased. Hands Up or I'll Shoot was only completed and distributed in 2009, making it the last East German film to be released.

== Plot ==
Lieutenant Holms, a People's Police detective, has always dreamed of solving complicated crimes. However, the German Democratic Republic has one of the world's lowest crime rates, and the sleepy town of Wolkenheim, in which he is stationed, is considered tranquil even by the national standards. Holms spends his days reading crime novels and daydreaming about working for Scotland Yard in the London underworld. He finally has a case when a local resident reports his rabbits were stolen, but he soon reveals they merely escaped to the nearby field. Holms sinks into a depression and begins to visit a psychiatrist. His friend, Pinkas, is a former thief who now works as a doorman in a hotel of the Handelsorganisation. Seeing Holms tormented, he enlists several other reformed criminals he knows from the old days in order to steal the antique statue located in the town's market square, so the policeman would for once have a serious challenge. Holms chases the gang to Leipzig in what becomes a comical pursuit, replete with mistakes and accidents, and is apprehended by the police himself; he also meets the charming Lucie. He eventually manages to arrest the thieves, but the mayor drops the charges as it would ruin Wolkenhim's eligibility to win the Banner for the Most Beautiful City. The detective is not troubled by that, and turns his attention to Lucie instead.

== Cast ==
- Rolf Herricht as Holms
- Zdeněk Štěpánek as Pinkas (voiced by Heinz Suhr)
- Hans-Joachim Preil as Elster Paule
- Hans Klering as man from Puseratz
- Fred Delmare as crook
- Evelyn Cron as Lucie
- Gerd E. Schäfer as psychiatrist
- Herbert Köfer as Heuschnupf the Carrion
- Gerd Ehlers as Crowbar
- Axel Triebel as Hinker
- Adolf Peter Hoffmann as Schimmy
- Jochen Bley as Hubert
- Walter Lendrich as Soft Waldi
- Manfred Uhlig as mayor
- Bruno Carstens as the major

== Production ==
=== Initial work ===
On 8 January 1965, screenwriter Rudi Strahl submitted a treatment under the working title The Luckiest Man ('Der glücklichste Mensch') to the DEFA studio. The comedy presented a police officer who is virtually out of work, whose name was Holms — a reference to Sherlock Holmes. Strahl's proposition would become the third in a series of four films created by him which starred Rolf Herricht, one of the country's most successful comedians, who would receive the role of Holms. The others were Geliebte weiße Maus, Der Reserveheld and Meine Freundin Sybille.

On 5 March, Hans-Joachim Kasprzik — who was regularly employed by the Deutscher Fernsehfunk television channel — agreed to direct the future film. On 19 May, the project was approved by dramaturge Werner Beck, who wrote in his assessment: "the aim of the film is to convey to the viewer, in a very optimistic and entertaining manner, one of the advantages of our socialist order: in a socialist society, the rug is pulled out from under the criminal underworld." Actor Herbert Köfer, who portrayed one of the thieves, said it seemed to present what the authorities would deem a positive notion, "what most people expected of socialism: when some will no longer have too much while others will not lack, would not crime quickly disappear?" Even the reformed thieves were seen to reject an offer by an American tourist to sell their stolen statue in exchange for dollars, to demonstrate they were "rooted in socialist moral." The GDR indeed had low offence rates: "with so many secret police officers, it wasn't exactly a hub of serious crime."

Strahl was instructed to complete the scenario by the end of May. On 26 June, DEFA approved the script's draft. On 15 July, a request to authorize it for production was sent to the studio's director-general Jochen Mückenberger. It was now called Hands Up or I'll Shoot, and was registered as project no. 454.

While Herricht was immediately given the role of Holms, the producers considered offering that of Pinkas to Erwin Geschonneck, Jan Werich, Jaroslav Marvan and even to West German Arno Paulsen, but eventually gave it to Zdeněk Štěpánek on the director's recommendation. On 2 August, the studio approved the final screenplay.

Principal photography commenced on 11 September; it was conducted in Altenburg until the 29th, then in Naumburg. The producers returned to Altenburg for a short session between 4 and 7 October, and afterwards moved to Leipzig, which they left on 12 November. Further filming was made in DEFA's own studios. Photography was completed on 7 January 1966, after seventy-one days: thirty-one in the studio and forty outside. The film's cost was summed to 1.68 million East German Mark, while the studio projected that it would earn 1.2 million Mark in revenues inside East Germany and further 200,000 abroad.

=== Cancellation ===
While work on the film was nearing completion in December 1965, the Central Committee of the Socialist Unity Party of Germany convened for its 11th Plenum, held between the 16th and the 18th, which would become "a grand Auto-da-fé" for the field of culture. In his speech on the first day, Member of the Politburo and Central Committee Secretary for Security Matters Erich Honecker stated: "few of the films produced by DEFA in recent months... The Rabbit Is Me and Just Don't Think I'll Cry... reflect tendencies which are alien and damaging to socialism... In the name of an 'abstract truth', those artists concentrate on presenting flaws in the GDR... They do not understand they hamper the development of a socialist consciousness among the working class." Many other functionaries echoed Honecker's line and blamed the country's cinema, television and theater for fostering a "pessimistic and skeptic" attitude. In the aftermath of the plenum, many prominent figures in the field of culture were dismissed, including Minister of Culture Hans Bentzien and DEFA's director-general Mückenberger. The Rabbit Is Me and Frank Beyer's Trace of Stones were banned, and ten other pictures followed; they would either be removed from circulation or remain unfinished. Among those was also Hands Up or I'll Shoot.

Studio officials inspected the film's rough cut on 28 February. Ralf Schenk wrote that after the meeting, "in a hysterical atmosphere, in which none knew what was wrong and what right, and what next would be considered an offence by the authorities", Kasprzik and Strahl compiled a list of twenty-two sequences to be removed or corrected. For example, they wrote: "the following sentence is unacceptable: 'when he met her, all thoughts about his fantasies or about dialectical materialism abandoned his mind'." and in another place, "When seeing the closed pawn office, the man will not say: 'planned economy!' but rather 'well, so it happens'." They also cut the second half of the sentence "no monument remains forever, new ones are built", spoken by one of the thieves, as they feared it would be interpreted as an allusion to the removal of Stalin's statues during De-Stalinization.

The DEFA directorate approved the picture on 14 April 1966. As Schenk noted, the studio still considered the picture's theme a positive and acceptable one, and did not believe it would encounter difficulties. On 19 April, a preliminary inspection of the materials was conducted by a board of representatives from the Ministry of Culture and the Ministry of the Interior. They concluded they cannot recommend to allow it to be distributed. Chairman Franz Jahrow wrote: "in its original version, the film contained openly ironic dialogues, which presented the successes of our Republic in a grotesque manner... Although much was removed by the request of the studio directorate, the film still expresses a hidden ironical approach." A day later, a screening of the material was held for Wilfried Maaß, the chairman of the Ministry of Culture's Film Department and other leading functionaries. They later decided "because of the problems with it... Further consultations must be held."

On 27 September 1966, the DEFA directorate rescinded its former resolution, and withdrew the submission of Hands Up for approval by the Ministry, stating: "in recognition of the political assessment... That this picture does not conform to the resolutions of the State Council regarding the struggle against crime." All work on the picture ceased, and the unedited footage was placed in the archives. Joshua Feinstein commented that in contrast to most other films banned after the Plenum, which were laid with strong artistic and political messages, Kasprzik's work was one of those that "seem to have fallen victim to bad timing and nothing else" as it was "thoroughly conventional".

=== Restoration ===
Already in the beginning of 1967, after reading a newspaper report that the number of criminal offences registered in 1966 — 124,524 — was the lowest in the country's history, Strahl wrote to DEFA, claiming that his film could now be screened, but was rejected. He then turned the script into a theater play, Perpetrate It Again ('Noch mal ein Ding drehn').

In 1970, as the Magdeburg Theater staged the play, DEFA's director-general Franz Bruk offered to consider a release of the film. On 10 April, Jahrow replied that he consulted with the chairman of the Press Department in the Ministry of the Interior, Zenner, who recommended not to authorize it. On 27 May, officials from the Film Department made another inspection of the picture; on 8 June, they concluded: "based on political and cultural reasons, definitively rejected."

In October 1989, during the dissolution of East Germany, the Union of Film and Television Workers of The GDR established a "banned films" task force to redistribute or, if necessary, restore the pictures censored by the government, including the twelve ones of the 11th Plenum. Kasprzik and Strahl decided not to complete Hands Up or I'll Shoot, as they deemed it insufficiently significant when compared to others. After reunification, the footage was transferred to the German Federal Archives.

In 2008, the Federal Archives and the DEFA Foundation resolved to restore Hands Up or I'll Shoot. The film's footage, original soundtrack and other material were stored in 570 boxes. During the summer and autumn of the year, the raw cut was edited by a combined team of experts who have already worked on several other East German pictures which were banned before being completed. The finished version lacked both the sequences which Kasprzik and Strahl removed to make the picture more acceptable — those were not found in the archive — and several colored scenes from Holms' dreams, which were painted in absurd manner to highlight their surrealism. On 28 June 2009, Hands Up or I'll Shoot had its premiere in Kino International, in Berlin's Karl-Marx-Allee, and was distributed to cinemas on 2 July. It is the last both among the pictures banned by East German censures and DEFA's films in general to be released.

== Reception ==
In its opening week, Hands Up had over 2,500 admissions, a number which rose to 15,170 by the end of 2009.

Roger Boyes wrote in The Times that the film "will probably not make the Germans roll in the aisles, and parts of it will be incomprehensible to youngsters". Daniel Kothenschulte of the Frankfurter Rundschau commented that few films could "outdo the harmlessness" of Strahl's "farce", but perhaps "it was the look of socialism fulfilled, as seen in Wolkenheim, that so terrified the functionaries?" Martin Mund from Neues Deutschland remarked that if there is "any demand by the audience" to see "an Ulbricht-era picture... It is largely due to the actors." Thomas Winkler of Der Spiegel added it "entertains with a subversive criticism of the system... It is no masterpiece, but yet a good, still amusing presentation of the reality of the Workers and Peasants' State." Kate Connolly of The Guardian wrote "It is particularly sweet for the older generation, who now have the chance to watch previously unseen footage of some of their favourite actors."

== See also ==
- Film censorship in East Germany
