= Herricht & Preil =

Popular comedic duo in East Germany

Herricht & Preil was a popular comedic duo in East Germany, consisting of Rolf Herricht and Hans-Joachim Preil. Their shows on stage, which were broadcast on GDR television, gained them national recognition and fame, some of the jokes became common phrases in everyday language to this day. Herricht and Preil were one of the most popular double acts in the GDR. In a survey conducted by the Mitteldeutscher Rundfunk, a German broadcasting station, Herricht and Preil were voted as the most popular and favored comedians.

Many of their sketches were released as LP records and cassette tapes, as well as on CDs and DVDs, both during their lifetime as well as posthumously.

== Career ==
The two of them met in 1951 in Bernburg, their first comedy sketch and later comedy routine was Die Schachpartie (The Chess Game) in 1953. For almost three decades (until Herricht's death in 1981), Herricht and Preil performed sketches that Preil was writing.

In all of their routines, Preil would act as a haughty smart-alec, while Herricht took on the role of a naïve, silly, yet sometimes shrewd bumpkin. The duo was thus often compared to Laurel and Hardy. The comedic routines would usually rely on the principle of Herricht misunderstanding what Preil was trying to explain about common topics such as owning a pet, gardenwork or poetry, with Herricht often coming to conclusions that are plays on word and sometimes even leading Preil on, driving the latter to comedic madness and despair. Their most popular acts were Der Klavierkauf (Buying a Piano), Die Briefmarke (The Stamp) and Die Reisebekanntschaft (The Traveling Acquaintance).

== Routines ==
- Der Weihnachtsmann (Santa Claus)
- Mückentötolin (Mückentötolin, a non-sensical name for an invention by Herricht, lit. "Mosquitodeathaline")
- Die Fahrschule (The Driver's School)
- Der Gartenfreund (The Garden Enthusiast)
- Der Bleistift (The Pencil)
- Der Tierarzt (The Vet)
- Der Schauspieler (The Actor)
- Der Klavierkauf (Buying a Piano)
- Die Briefmarke (The Stamp)
- Das Schachspiel (The Chess Game)
- Die Tigerjagd (The Tiger Hunt)
- Reisebekanntschaft (The Travelling Acquaintance)
- Hoppegarten (Hoppegarten)
- Der Tipschein (The Lottery Ticket)
- Der Krimi (The Thriller)
- Die Seefahrt (The Cruise)
- Hypnose (Hypnosis)
- Die Hasenjagd (Hare Hunting)
- Das Gedicht (The Poem)
- Auf dem Fussballplatz (On the Soccer Playfield)
- G wie Schee (G as Jay)
- Die Jagd (The Hunt)
- Das Kartenspiel (The Game of Cards)

== Discography ==
- Schachmatt/Der Schauspieler 1964. Single
- Aber Herr Preil! 1966. LP
- Eine Stunde gute Laune 1972. LP, MC
- Eine 2. Stunde gute Laune, 1976. LP, MC
- Eine Überstunde gute Laune, 1988. LP, MC
- Herricht & Preil: Das waren wir, 1993–95. (4 CDs)
- Herricht & Preil: Das waren wir. Die besten Sketche, 2004. DVD
