= Helga Hahnemann =

East German performer

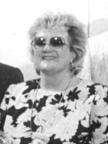
- 1988
- Born: September 8, 1937; Berlin-Pankow (Wilhelmsruh), Germany
- Died: November 20, 1991 (aged 54); Berlin-Pankow, Germany
- Education: Ernst Busch Academy of Dramatic Arts, Berlin-Niederschöneweide
- Occupations: Cabaret artiste Stage performer Actress; Singer; Voice-over artiste Television/radio presenter/moderator
- Spouse: Maria Johanna Caroline Bladt

Helga "Big Helga" Hahnemann (8 September 1937 - 20 November 1991) was an East German multi-faceted stage performer and entertainer. She came to wider prominence through her television and radio appearances after 1962. By the time reunification arrived in 1990 she had become a leading star of the small screen in East Germany. She fell terminally ill and then died shortly afterwards, possibly because of the extent of her addiction to cigarettes: she was 54. Her death left unanswered the question of how successfully her performances might have captivated pan-German television audiences post unification.

The annual "Goldene Henne" (literally "Golden Hen") prize was inaugurated in 1995 to celebrate and commemorate her. (One of Helga Hahnemann's informal soubriquets among fans was "Henne".)

== Life and career ==
Helga "Henne" Hahnemann was born in Berlin-Wilhelmsruh, the youngest of her parents' four children, a couple of years before war broke out. Wilhelmsruh was a central quarter of Berlin which after 1945 would find itself administered as part of the Soviet occupation zone. The zone was rebranded and relaunched in October 1949 as the Soviet sponsored German Democratic Republic (East Germany). She later told an interviewer that she discovered her talent for comedy while still at school. Passing her Abitur (school final exams) opened the way for a university-level education: between 1956 and 1959 Hahnemann studied at the Ernst Busch Academy of Dramatic Arts in Berlin-Niederschöneweide. In 1959 she made her stage debut with Die Pfeffermühle (literally, "The Pepper Mill"), a mildly edgy cabaret ensemble established five years earlier in Leipzig.

She found Leipzig did not suit her, however, and returned in 1961 or 1962 to Berlin, where she concentrated on cabaret and comedy genres, working on a freelance basis, primarily with one-woman programmes. Increasingly, however, she found herself undertaking work for DFF, East Germany's party-controlled monopoly broadcaster. Her work covered television and radio work as well as voice-acting assignments. Some of her best remembered appearances from this time were on the regular satirical comedy show, "Tele-BZ". Her appearances as the main attraction on "Tele-BZ", which soon won a nationwide audience of several million for the shows in which she appeared, continued for three decades, earning her the prestigious arts prize of the East German Trades Union Federation. Eventually, in 1969, Hahnemann joined the broadcaster's payroll as a member of the "DFF Drama Ensemble" ("Schauspielerensemble des DFF"). She remained on the payroll for the next 21 years, despite an annual salary of 1,500 Ostmarks, which even then was a relatively modest amount: by 1990 it had increased to 2,100 Ostmarks.

1974 marked the start of a productive seventeen partnership with the scriptwriter Angela Gentzmer who worked with her on song lyrics and sketches. At least one source describes the two women as a "dream team". Where the dream team needed a new tune, the composer Arndt Bause would produce another from his apparently endless stream of new dance music melodies. The material Hahnemann was now using made her "the voice of the little man". There are suggestions that she was allowed a certain measure of license that a more overtly political performer would have been denied. At the end of the 1970s she began working with the Berliner Rundfunk ("East Berlin Radio") as a moderator-presenter on her programme "Helgas Top(p)-Musike", which also formed the basis for three television programmes. Success as a singer continued with "Schlager" numbers - many employing local Berlin dialect - such as "Wo ist mein Jeld bloß geblieben", " Jetzt kommt dein Süße", "U-Bahn-Beat", "100 mal Berlin", "Clärchens Ballhaus" (sung as a duet with Hartmut Schulze-Gerlach), and "Een kleenet Menschenkind".

Another much loved programme which Hahnemann regularly presented was Ein Kessel Buntes, a Saturday evening television variety show. She performed with actor-comedians such as Alfred Müller, Herbert Köfer, Dagmar Gelbke and Ingeborg Naß in a wide variety of television comedy sketches. She appeared regularly alongside Rolf Herricht, Gerd E. Schäfer, Margot Ebert, Traute Sense and Heinz Behrens in her role as "Erna Mischke" in the long-running light-hearted television drama series Maxe Baumann. She teamed up with Ingeborg Naß to head up workers' cabaret in Berlin. Hahnemann also progressed her career as a voice-over artist. Of particular note in this context was the use of her voice for Yvonne Jensen, the main female protagonist in the popular German-language versions for 3 of the 14 (filmed in Danish) Olsen Gang movies.

The changes which led the German Democratic Republic to democracy were followed, formally in October 1990, by German reunification. Hahnemann set about trying to win over audiences in a very different kind of Germany, in which western social and economic norms tended to trump those that had emerged in the east under Soviet socialism. However, she was already terminally ill. There were well advanced plans for a New Year's Eve "television spectacular" on 31 December 1990 / 1 January 1991 with Helga Hahnemann presenting it. In the event she was too ill to participate. It remains unclear when she realised the seriousness of her physical problems. Sources indicate that "Big Helga" had long been noted as a big eater, and she was a heavy smoker. There are indications that for several months she held off visiting a doctor in pursuit of a diagnosis. She was keen that "the public should say she was 100% fit when she died". According to at least one source the late-stage lung cancer diagnosis came through in November 1991, when only a couple of weeks of life were left to her.

== Selected honors ==
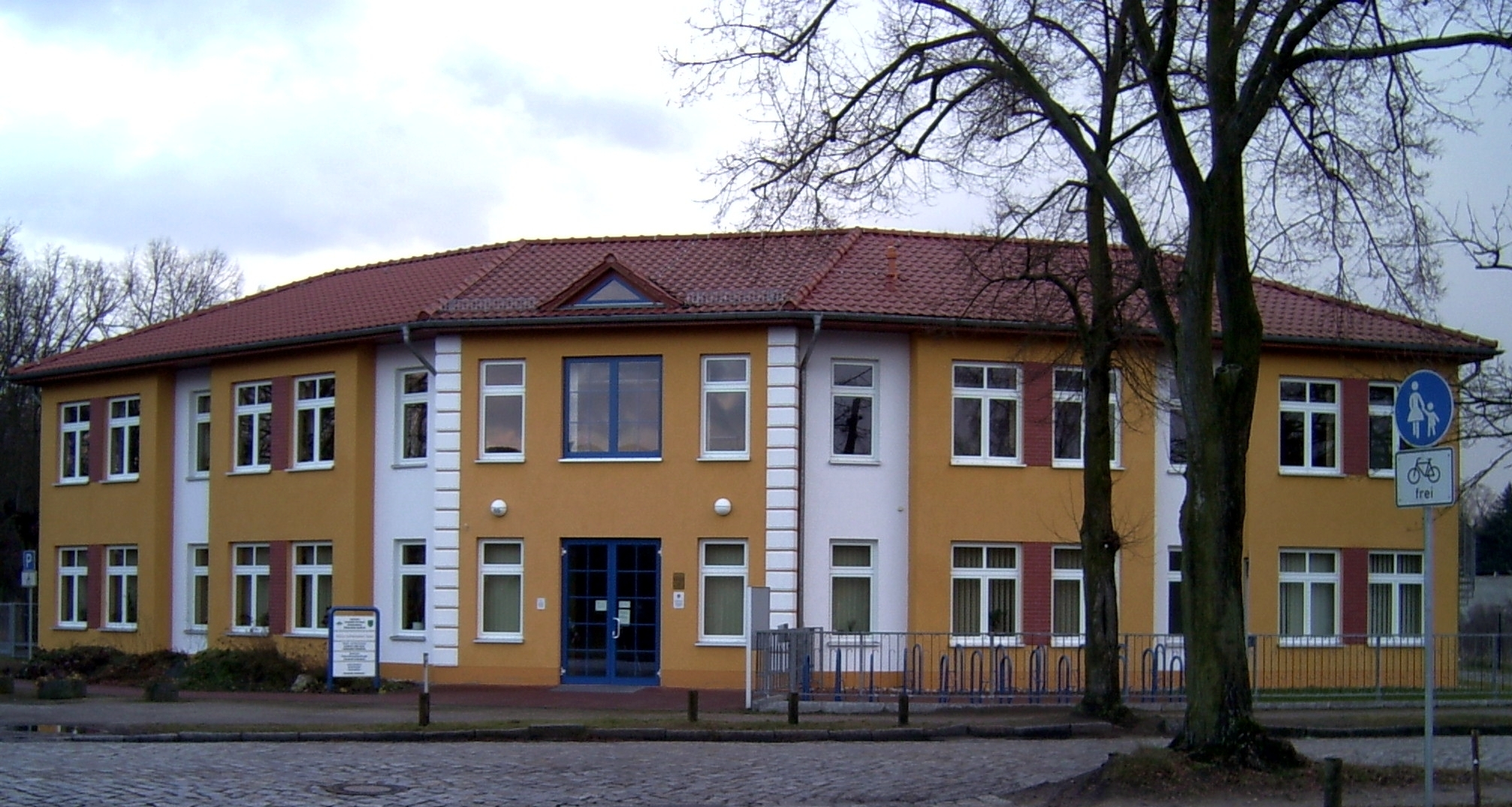
Helga-Hahnemann-Haus, Schöneiche opened, 2000, photograph date: 2005

- In 1982 Hahnemann was a recipient of the Art Prize of the German Democratic Republic. The National Prize (Arts and Literature: class III) came in 1987.
- The annual "Goldene Henne" audience prize, organised and awarded since 1995 by the magazine Superillu, along with the broadcasters Mitteldeutscher Rundfunk (Leipzig) and RBB (Berlin), is dedicated to her.
- A new community activities centre was opened in Schöneiche, where Hahnemann made her home for many years, in 2000. It is named "Helga-Hahnemann-Haus" in her honour. Appropriately, one of the uses made of the hall is as a music school. In 2014 the municipality unveiled a proposal to sell it in response to a desperate shortage of municipal funds, but following a public uproar the council voted down the idea.
- A footpath in the centre of Berlin carries her name.
- A street in Schönefeld carried her name.
- A star on Berlin's expanding Boulevard of the Stars was dedicated to Helga Hahnemann on 10 September 2010.
- The artist Joachim Tilsch has created a large mural image entitled "Schöneicher Frühstück" ("Schöneicher Breakfast"), depicting three recently deceased celebrity entertainment artists, for the main shopping centre in Schöneiche. Helga Hahnemann is one of the three celebrities included. (The others are the puppeteer Heinz Schröder and the satirist-journalist-author Ottokar Domma.)
