= Rudi Strahl =

German playwright, novelist and poet

Rudi Strahl (14 September 1931 – 4 May 2001) was a German playwright, novelist and poet. He was one of the most played theatre playwrights of the GDR.

== Life and work ==
As son of a locksmith he migrated in 1948 to the Soviet occupation zone. His mother was named Emilie Anna L. Strahl (1902–1981), his father was Rudolf Strahl (1900–1944). Since 1950 he served in the Volkspolizei, later in the Kasernierte Volkspolizei and went to an Officer Candidate School. His military term of service lasted eight years, at his retirement in the year 1959 he was lieutenant of the NVA. During his term of service he was an employee of the publishing house of the Ministry of National Defense. 1956 he married Alice Strahl, with whom he had two sons, Bob Strahl (1959–1997), likewise a writer, and Stefan Strahl (born 1969), who makes music. His two brothers were Harry Strahl (1924–1945(?)) and Manfred Strahl (1940–2000).

1955 he published with Sturm auf Stollberg (Storming of Stollberg) his first narrative. 1957/58 he visited the Institute for Literature „Johannes R. Becher“. From 1959 until 1961 he was editor of the satirical magazine „Eulenspiegel“. Afterward, he worked in Berlin as a freelancer. 1973 he became a member of the GDR's Writer Union and was belonging to its presidium since 1978. 1980 he joined the GDR PEN centre. His grave is located on the Dorotheenstadt cemetery in Berlin.

His books reached a total edition of about 4.6 million copies, his theatre plays had more than 560 stagings. Rudi Strahl's works were translated into 26 languages. He scripted numerous movies and television plays. Also his juvenile book Du und ich und Klein-Paris (You and I in litte Paris), published in Berlin's Verlag Neues Leben, was filmed 1970 by the DEFA. His piece Er ist wieder da (He is back again) grounded an original adaptation by Peter Hack with the title Barby. Rudi Strahl's relation to the reality of real socialism was that of a sceptical GDR patriot, who – especially as theatre comic poet – has faith in the changeability of circumstances and wants to convey this faith in a cheerful way, but his pieces also definitely show lackings in the system and moral-political problems of an affluent society.

== Awards ==
- Children's book award (1961)
- Lessing Award of the GDR (1974)
- Goethe Award of the City Berlin (1977)
- Patriotic Order of Merit in bronze (1978)
- National Prize of the GDR (1980)
- State Award for Popular Theatre Pieces of the state Baden-Württemberg

== Selected works ==
Dramas

- In Sachen Adam und Eva (1969)
- Nochmal ein Ding drehen (1971)
- Der Krösus von Wolkenau (1971)
- Keine Leute, keine Leute (1973)
- Ein irrer Duft von frischem Heu (1975)
- Arno Prinz von Wolkenstein oder Kader entscheiden alles (1979)
- Er ist wieder da (1980)
- Vor aller Augen (1983)
- Es war die Lerche (1990)
- Ein seltsamer Heiliger oder ein irrer Duft von Bibernell (1995)

Scripts

- Der Reserveheld (1965)
- Hands Up or I'll Shoot (1966/2009)
- Meine Freundin Sybille (1967)
- Wir lassen uns scheiden (1968, scenario)
- Seine Hoheit – Genosse Prinz (1969)
- Robinson für eine Nacht (1970, television)
- Du und ich und Klein-Paris (1971)
- Ein irrer Duft von frischem Heu (1977)

Children's books

- Sandmännchen auf der Leuchtturminsel (Sandmännchen on the light house island) with illustrations of Eberhard Binder (1963)
- Robinson im Müggelwald (Robinson in the Müggelwald) with illustrations of Eberhard Binder (1969)

Satires

- Aufs Happy-End ist kein Verlaß with illustrations of Werner Klemke (1966)
- Von Mensch zu Mensch. Ein buntes Sammelsurium in Versen und in Prosa with illustrations of Karl-Georg Hirsch (1969)
- Menschen, Masken, Mimen in kleiner Prosa, Vers und Szene (1984)
