= Manfred Uhlig =

German radio host (1927–2019)

- Born: September 2, 1927; Leipzig, Saxony, Germany
- Died: July 24, 2019 (aged 91)
- Occupations: Actor; cabaret artist; entertainer; television and radio presenter

Manfred Uhlig (2 September 1927 - 24 July 2019) was a German actor, cabaret artist, entertainer and also television and radio presenter.

== Life ==
Born 1927 in Leipzig, Uhlig studied drama at the end of the 1940s and after finishing accepted acting jobs at theatres and cabarets in Naumburg, Wittenberg and Schwerin. Since 1956 he was member of the Leipziger Pfeffermühle cabaret ensemble, which was founded two years before. On 30 June 1962 he left, together with Helga Hahnemann, and the two of them switched their focus to television and radio work. In 1965 Uhlig teamed up with Günter Hansel, presenting over the next 24 years 289 episodes of the programme Alte Liebe rostet nicht at Radio DDR 1, which with that was among the most long-lived German radio broadcasts. He became known i.a. with the programmes Leipziger Allerlei and Kollege kommt gleich. In the GDR television he appeared as satirist f.e. in Da lacht der Bär and Da liegt Musike drin. Moreover, together with Horst Köbbert and Lutz Stückrath as cabaret trio The three dialecticians, he presented 28 episodes of the Saturday evening show Ein Kessel Buntes. In 1978 he was awarded with the Art Prize of the GDR.

Following the German reunification (Wende) he occasionally worked for the MDR.

Uhlig died in 2019.

== Filmography ==
| Year | Title | Role | Notes |
|---|---|---|---|
| 1966 | Hands Up or I'll Shoot | Bürgermeister | |
