= Ein Kessel Buntes =

Defunct East German television variety show

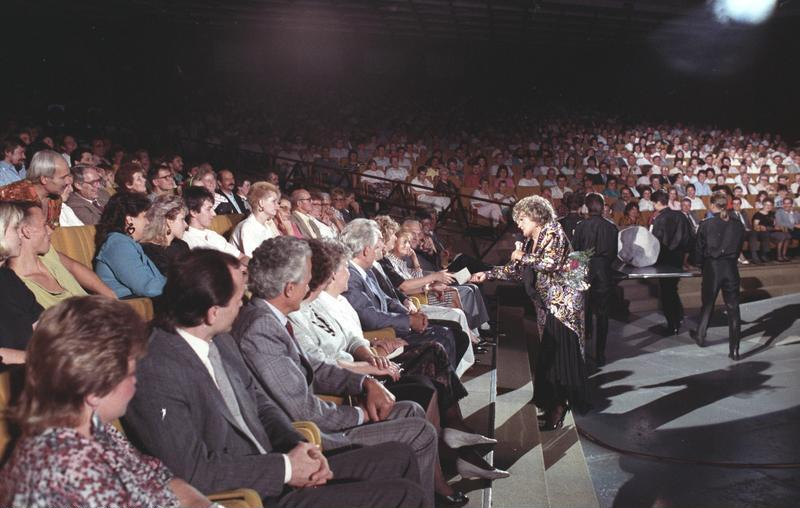
Presenter Helga Hahnemann during the 100th episode of Ein Kessel Buntes, at the Palast der Republik on 23 September 1989

Ein Kessel Buntes ("A Kettle of Colour") is a television variety show in the former East Germany. It broadcast from 1972 to 1992. A total of 113 shows were made, six per year. It was broadcast at first from the Friedrichstadtpalast theatre, and later from the Palast der Republik, as well as from other prominent music halls in other East German cities. Its title sequence showed a series of famous clocks in East Berlin, such as that on the Rotes Rathaus and the Weltzeituhr at Alexanderplatz displaying the time of broadcast, 8 p.m. (scheduled to clash with the main evening news on ARD)

Ein Kessel Buntes was originally hosted by actors Horst Köbbert (who spoke Low German from the north), Lutz Stückrath (a speaker of the Berlin dialect), and Manfred Uhlig (who spoke Saxon from the south), whose satirical commentary during the live broadcasts often criticised the East German government. They were soon replaced by a rotating cast of celebrities.

The show was meant to compete with those on West German television (which most East Germans were able to receive and watch). To this end, it was fairly successful, even attracting a following in parts of West Germany which could receive Eastern television. Its production values were high, as apart from song and dance numbers and appearances from East German celebrities, almost every broadcast featured singers from the western world, often after their popularity had peaked in their home countries.

After German reunification, and the dissolution of Fernsehen der DDR, the concept and name of the program were taken over by the ARD and broadcast on Das Erste, following the main news programme Tagesschau. Karsten Speck hosted the show ten times during Ein Kessel Buntes' final two years, starting on 12 January 1991. At one time, Frank Schöbel also moderated the programme. The last show ran on 19 December 1992. It is still shown in reruns and in best-of shows.

Numerous stars were invited to participate: ABBA, Amanda Lear, Secret Service, Bad Boys Blue, Dalida, Karel Gott, Dara Rolins, Helena Vondráčková, Zsuzsa Koncz, Alla Pugacheva, Sofia Rotaru, Kati Kovács and others.

== Literature ==
- Das war unser Kessel Buntes, Hans-Ulrich Brandt, Angela Kaiser, Evelin Matt, Günther Steinbacher (ISBN 3-89706-890-7)
- Ein Kessel Buntes und mehr, Hendrik Petzold (ISBN 3-89812-090-2)
