= Angela Gentzmer =

German author and songwriter (1929–2024)

- Born: 13 December 1929; Berlin
- Died: May 24, 2024 (aged 94); Berlin
- Occupation: Writer

Angela Gentzmer (13 December 1929 – 24 May 2024) was a German author and songwriter.

== Life ==
Gentzmer was born in Berlin in 1929. At the end of the 1950s, she joined the GDR television. There she worked as a production manager, director and author until 1973. From 1974, she worked for Helga Hahnemann, for whom she wrote many texts, especially in the 1980s, and thus contributed significantly to her success. Angela Gentzmer died on 24 May 2024 in Berlin.

== Literature ==
- Angela Gentzmer: Een kleenet Menschenkind. Erinnerungen an Helga Hahnemann. Mit vielen Fotos aus dem Leben und von Bühnenauftritten Helga Hahnemanns. Das Neue Berlin, Berlin 1994, ISBN 3-359-00727-1.
- Angela Gentzmer: Helga Hahnemann. Die schärfsten Sprüche, Eulenspiegel, Berlin 2000, ISBN 3-359-00991-6.
- Angela Gentzmer: Das dicke Helga-Hahnemann-Buch. War schön mit euch … Mit Liedern, Sketchen, Sprüchen, Erinnerungen. Eulenspiegel, Berlin 2006, ISBN 978-3-359-01650-2.
