= Eberhard Binder =

German illustrator

Eberhard Binder (1924–1998) was a German illustrator, particularly of book dust jackets.

Binder worked mainly in East Germany, and was very prolific.

== Publications (as illustrator) ==
- Sandmännchen auf der Leuchtturminsel (Sandmännchen on the lighthouse island) by Rudi Strahl, 1963
- Robinson im Müggelwald by Rudi Strahl, 1969
