= Hauptmann Florian von der Mühle =

1968 film

- Directed by: Werner W. Wallroth
- Release date: 1968
- Country: East Germany
- Language: German

Hauptmann Florian von der Mühle is an East German film. It was released in 1968.

== Cast ==
- Manfred Krug: Florian
- Regina Beyer: Duchess Guastalla
- Rolf Herricht: Amadeus
- Gisela Bestehorn: Baroness Colloredo
- Jutta Klöppel: Fanny Schauendorf
- Hans Hardt-Hardtloff: Nepomuk
- Rolf Hoppe: police chief
- Peter Sturm: police chief (voice)
- Doris Abeßer: Nanderl
- Werner Lierck: adjutant
- Wolf Sabo: Metternich
- Carmen Maja Antoni: medic's assistant
- Peter Biele: 1. secretary
- Eberhard Cohrs: policeman
