= Lyons and Yosco =

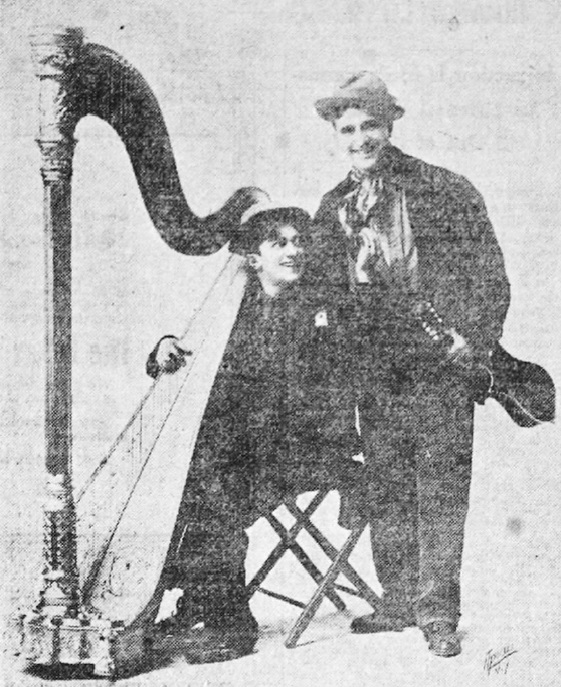
- Lyons (left) and Yosco (right) in a publicity photo, 28 January 1914

Background information
- Birth name: Dominick George Martoccio and Rocco Giuseppe Iosco
- Genres: Vaudeville, ragtime, popular music
- Occupation(s): musicians, comedians, composers
- Instrument(s): harp, voice and mandolin
- Years active: early 1900s
- Labels: Victor Records, Columbia Records

Lyons and Yosco were an American comedy duo, consisting of the Italian-American musicians George Lyons and Bob Yosco. They toured the United States from 1909 into 1923, doing a musical and comedy act.

The Ottawa Evening Journal dubbed them "the finest pair of Italian street musicians playing in the Vaudeville ranks." The News Journal described their performance, saying they were "the best vocalists and instrumentalists of the street variety on the stage, proved intensely interesting, while their droll comedy kept the audience laughing much of the time."

They were also successful composers of popular music, including ragtime. One of their best known works was the million-selling ragtime piece, "Spaghetti Rag" which was notably popular during the ragtime revival in the 1950s. Their compositions were recorded by performers for Victor Records and Columbia Records.

== George Lyons ==
George Lyons was the stage name for Dominick George Martoccia (b. 26 June 1889, New York City – d. 31 January 1958, Ft. Lauderdale, Florida). In his life he was a Vaudeville performer, a composer, and a movie actor. He was described by the Los Angeles Herald as "a premier harpist, playing most every kind of music, including ragtime, on his instrument." Prior to his partnership with Bob Yosco, he worked in 1908 and 1909 with Eddie Parks, a singer and dancer, and when they parted he seems to have kept the basic act to use with Yosco. He starred in a Metro-Goldwyn-Mayer short movie, George Lyons, The Singing Harpist in 1929, performing four songs. He also acted in the MGM movies Hylton and His Band (1937) and In the Spotlight (1935).

== Bob Yosco ==
Spaghetti Rag (1910)

Robert Joseph Yosco (b. 11 February 1874, Castelmezzano, Italy – d. 19 September 1942, Brooklyn, New York) was born Rocco Giuseppe Iosco. He was a Vaudeville performer, comedian, composer, singer and actor, and played mandolin, violin and cello. He is considered one of the first ragtime mandolin players in America. The Los Angeles Herald called his cello and mandolin playing "of high order", but was less impressed with his singing. The Harrisburg Telegraph had a different opinion, saying they "took their audience by storm with their vocal duets. They were applauded several times for encores. They could sing in a real way and that is half of any act."

=== Lawrence Yosco ===
Robert's cousin, Lawrence Yosco was also involved in music, founding the Lawrence Yosco Manufacturing Company of New York, making banjos and mandolins. He also toured the country as a guitar and banjo soloist.

== Works ==
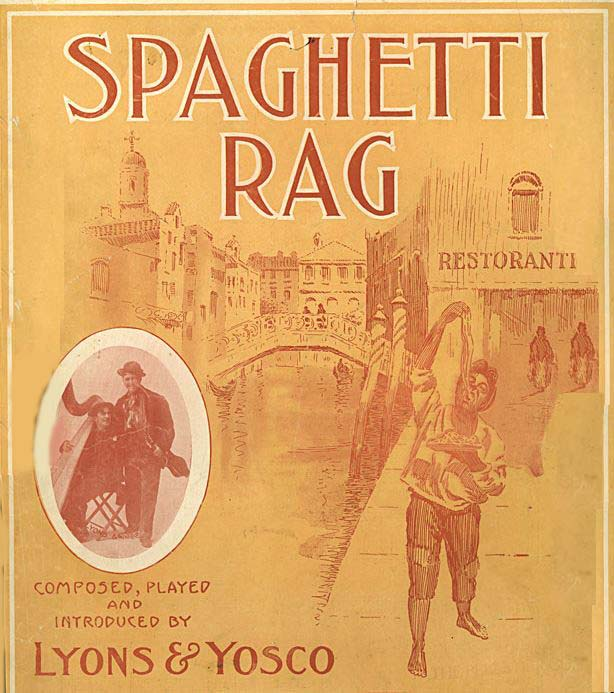
Cover of sheet music "Spaghetti Rag" (1910)

According to David A. Jasen, in his book Ragtime gems: original sheet music for 25 ragtime classics, sheet music for ragtime songs sometimes sold a million copies (the standard of today's Platinum Record for recorded music). It tended not to happen as quickly as with music sales today, taking as long as 20 years for the hit "Maple Leaf Rag", but it did happen.

"Spaghetti Rag" (1910) was part of a list of million-selling songs that included Scott Joplin's "Maple Leaf Rag" and Charles L. Johnson's "Dill Pickles Rag". A different version was published in 1950, with words added by Dick Rogers. Although it was long a staple of their vaudeville act, they never recorded it. The earliest record was made by banjoist Vess L. Ossman (1 July 1912), and probably the most known version was performed by Robert Maxwell (1950), arranged for harp, tenor banjo and tuba.

"Spaghetti Rag" became popular in the swing and honky-tonk music scenes, being covered by artists such as Jack Fina (January 1950), Ray Anthony (March 1950), Frankie Carle (March 1950), Beatrice Kay (April 1950), Jan August (July 1950), Russ Morgan (January 1952), Johnny Maddox (1955), Joe "Fingers" Carr (1956), Big Tiny Little (1957), Claude Thornhill (March 1959) and Jo Ann Castle (1960). It is also cited as an influence on Tom Lehrer's "The Vatican Rag".

I'm Coming Back to Dixie and You
"I'm Coming Back to Dixie and You" performed by the Peerless Quartet in 1914. Written by George Lyons, Bob Yosco and Frank Mullane.

Lyons and Yosco also composed popular songs like:

- "I'm Coming Back to Dixie and You", lyrics by Frank Mullane, performed by The Peerless Quartet (16 June 1914) and Frank Crumit (14 April 1920).
- "Rose of Italy", lyrics by Edgar Selden, performed by Walter Van Brunt (1915)
- "I Miss You", lyrics by George Lyons and Bob Yosco, performed by Edwin Dale also known as Tandy Mackenzie (December 1922)

== Published music ==
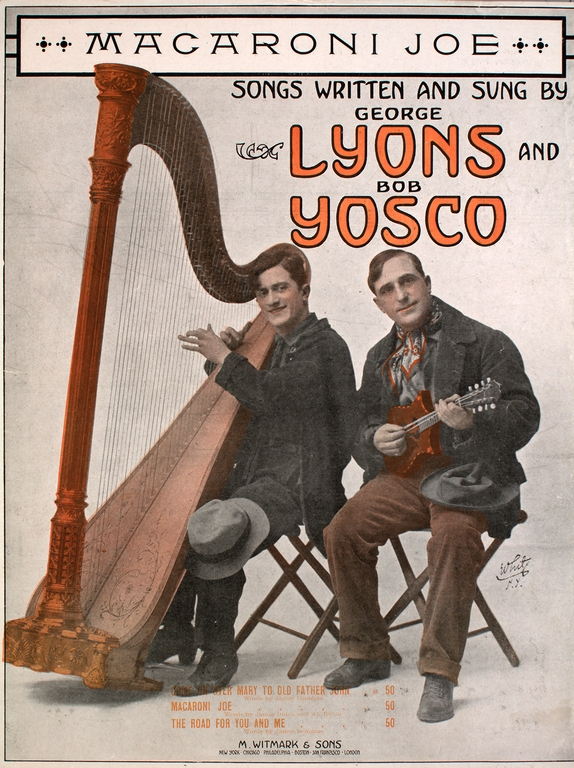
Lyons and Yosco, from their 1917 sheet music, "Macaroni Joe"

=== George Lyons and Bob Yosco ===
- Tony Rag, The Cowboy Whop (1910)
- Spaghetti Rag (1910)
- Mardi Gras Rag (1914)
- I'm Coming Back To Dixie and You (1914)
- Rose of Italy (1914)
- Don't Worry, Dearie (1917)
- Macaroni Joe (1917)
- The Road for You and Me (1917)
- Santa Rosa Rose (1918)
- The Liberty Boys are Coming (1918) (manuscript)
- Sweet Anna Marie (1919)
- The Toast of the USA (1919)
- Come Along and Hum Along With Me (1920)
- Italy (1921)
- Main Street (c. 1921)
- It Must Be Someone Like You (c. 1921)
- There's Only One Pal, After All (c. 1921)
- I Miss You (1922)
- Sometime in Junetime (1923)

=== Bob Yosco ===
- What's the Use of Trying to Forget the One You Love (1910)
- The Old Love is the Best Love After All (1913)
- I'm a Happy Gondoliero (1929)
