= Schöneiche =

Schöneiche bei Berlin
- Municipality
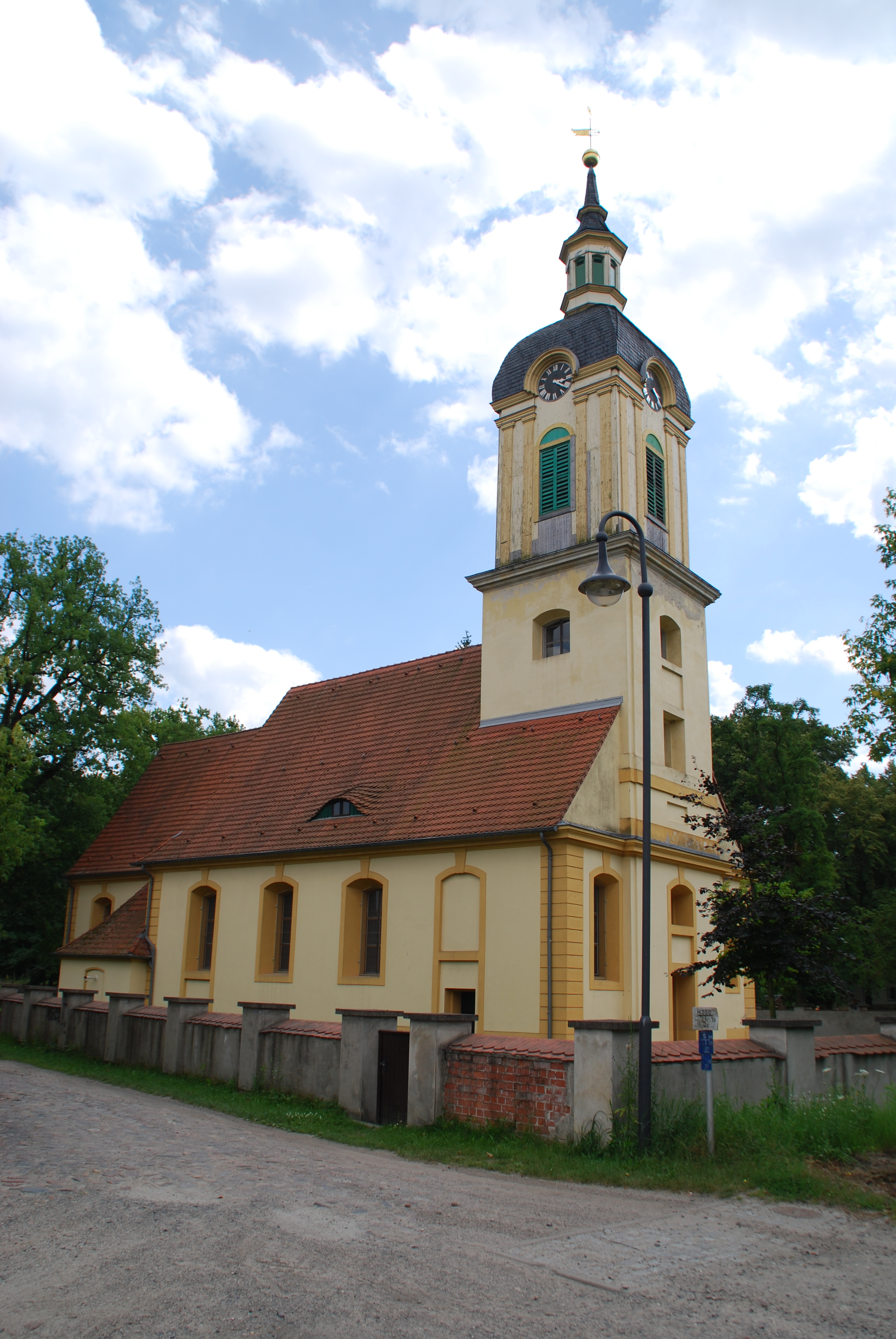
- Schöneiche – Old Castle Church

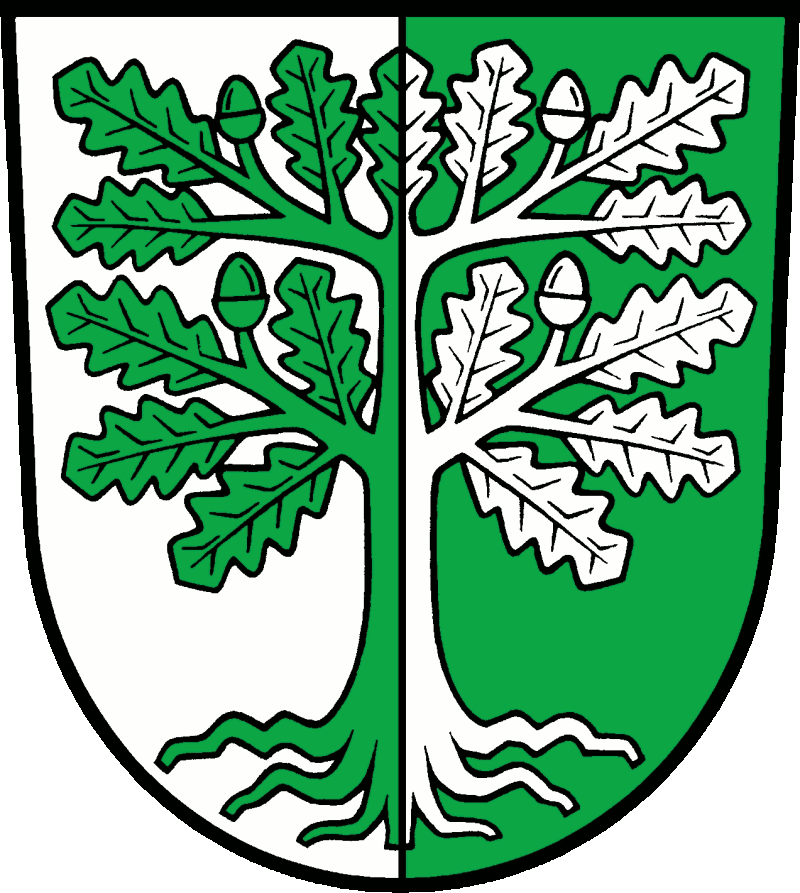
- Coat of arms

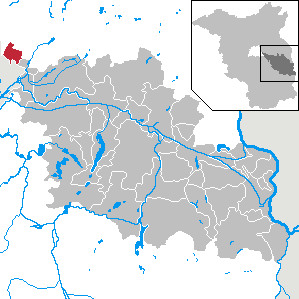
- Location of Schöneiche bei Berlin within Oder-Spree district
- Interactive map of Schöneiche bei Berlin
- Location within Germany Location within Brandenburg
- Coordinates: 52°28′00″N 13°40′59″E
- Country: Germany
- State: Brandenburg
- District: Oder-Spree

Government
  - Mayor (2016–24): Ralf Steinbrück (SPD)

Area
  - Total: 16.73 km^{2} (6.46 sq mi)
- Elevation: 38 m (125 ft)

Population (2025-12-31)
  - Total: 12,997
  - Density: 776.9/km^{2} (2,012/sq mi)
- Time zone: UTC+01:00 (CET)
  - Summer (DST): UTC+02:00 (CEST)
- Postal codes: 15566
- Dialling codes: 030
- Vehicle registration: LOS
- Website: www.schoeneiche-bei-berlin.de

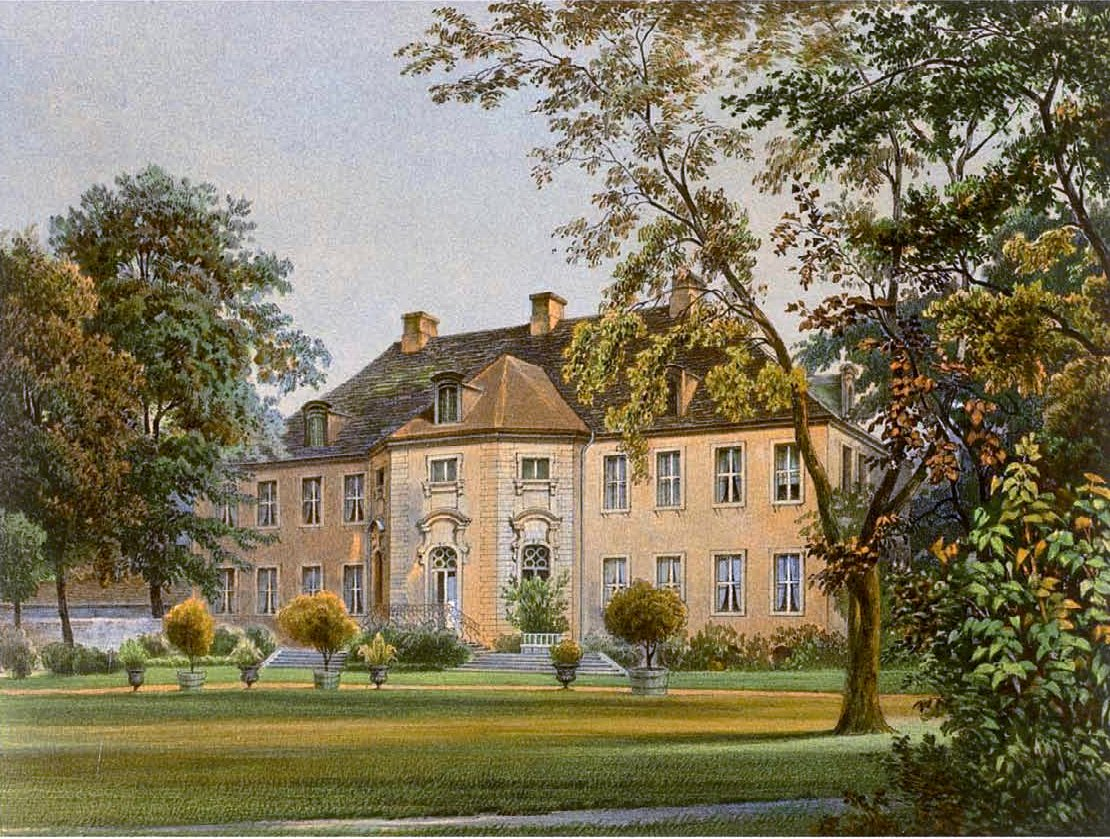
Palace Schöneiche around 1860, Edition by Alexander Duncker

Schöneiche bei Berlin (German pronunciation: [ˈʃøːnʔaɪçə baɪ bɛʁˈliːn], lit. 'Schöneiche near Berlin'), commonly known as Schöneiche, is a municipality in the Oder-Spree District of Brandenburg, Germany. It is situated directly at the edge to Berlin/Friedrichshagen and next to Rüdersdorf and Woltersdorf, Brandenburg on the eastern edge of the German capital Berlin.

It is served by the Schöneiche bei Berlin tramway which runs from Rüdersdorf to Berlin-Friedrichshagen station on the Berlin S-Bahn network.

== Demography ==
Development of population since 1875 within the current boundaries (blue line: population; dotted line: comparison to population development in Brandenburg state; grey background: time of Nazi Germany; red background: time of communist East Germany)

Recent population development and projections (population development before 2011 census (blue line); recent population development according to the Census in Germany in 2011 (blue bordered line); official projections for 2005-2030 (yellow line); for 2017-2030 (scarlet line); for 2020-2030 (green line)

Schöneiche bei Berlin: Population development
within the current boundaries (2020)

Year	Pop.	±% p.a.
1875	846	—
1890	1,005	+1.15%
1910	2,984	+5.59%
1925	4,727	+3.11%
1939	9,153	+4.83%
1950	9,561	+0.40%
1964	9,970	+0.30%

Year	Pop.	±% p.a.
1971	10,175	+0.29%
1981	9,241	−0.96%
1985	8,906	−0.92%
1990	8,199	−1.64%
1995	9,428	+2.83%
2000	11,299	+3.69%
2005	12,004	+1.22%

Year	Pop.	±% p.a.
2010	12,196	+0.32%
2015	12,311	+0.19%
2016	12,337	+0.21%
2017	12,494	+1.27%
2018	12,666	+1.38%
2019	12,789	+0.97%
2020	12,899	+0.86%

== Notable people ==
- Georg Luger (1849–1923), designer of the famous Luger pistol
- Max Fechner (1892–1973), politician (SPD / SED), 1924–1933 Deputy of the Prussian Landtag, 1949–1953 Minister of Justice of the GDR
- Margarete Herzberg (1921–2007), operatic mezzosoprano
- Ottokar Domma (1924–2007), journalist and writer
- Heinz Schröder (1928–2009), puppet player (Pittiplatsch and Schnatterinchen, Mr. Fuchs and Mrs. Elster)
- Waltraud Kretzschmar (1948–2018), handball player
- Frank Terletzki (born 1950), footballer
- Bernhard Hochwald (born 1957), olympic shooter
- Frank Pastor (born 1957), footballer
- Lisa Buckwitz (born 1994), bobsledder, olympic gold medalist 2018

== Gallery ==
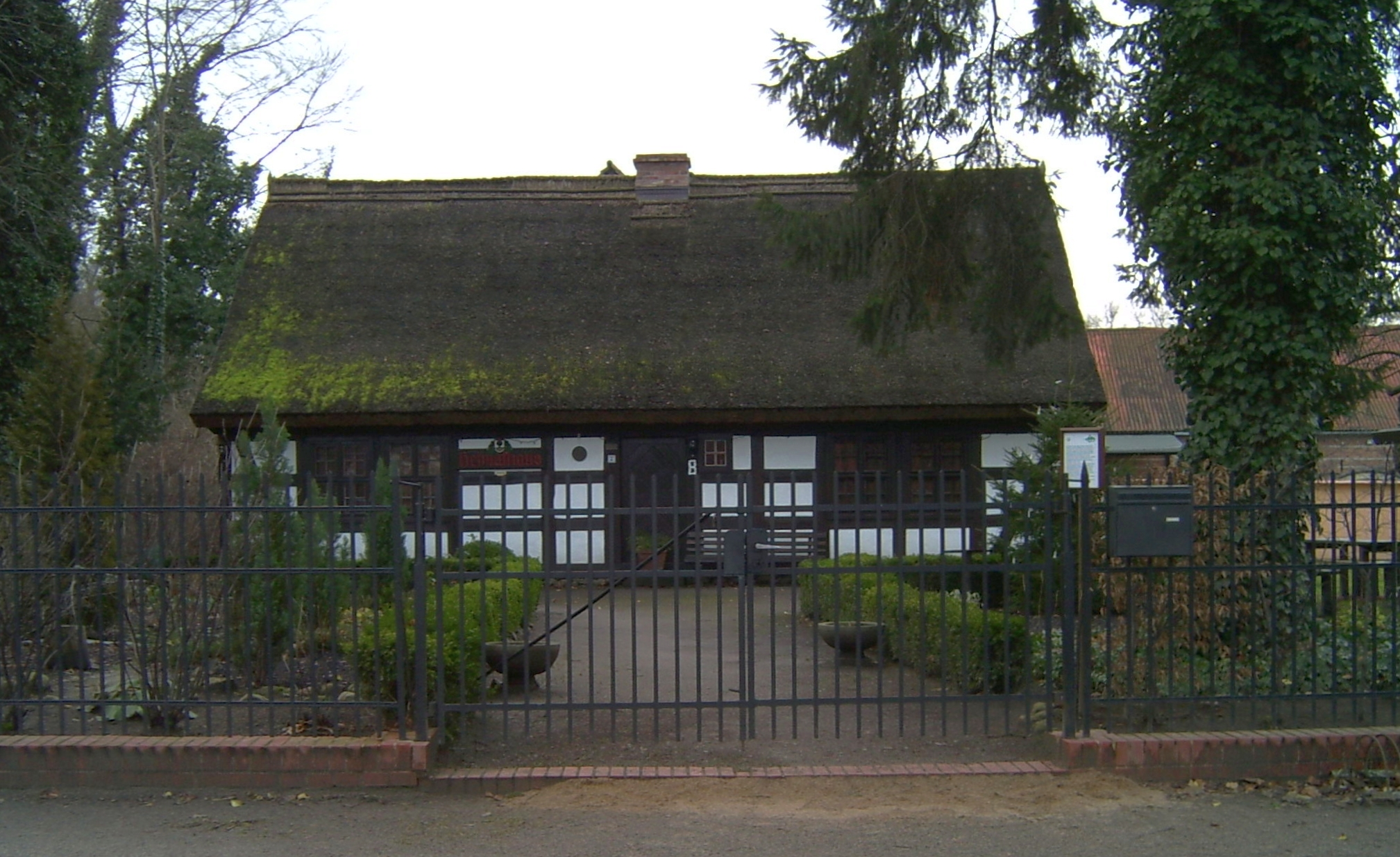
"Heimathouse" (oldest existing house and village museum)
