= Geliebte weiße Maus =

1964 film

- Directed by: Gottfried Kolditz
- Produced by: Eric Kuhne
- Starring: Rolf Herricht; Karin Schroder
- Cinematography: Gunter Haubold
- Music by: Conny Odd
- Release date: 1964
- Country: East Germany
- Language: German

Geliebte weiße Maus (Beloved White Mouse) is a 1964 East German musical film. Produced by Eric Kuhne, the film had music by Conny Odd with cinematography by Gunter Haubold. Fritz Bachmann (Rolf Herricht) is the titular character, an East German traffic police officer (these officers were dubbed "Weisse Maus" ("White Mouse") because of their high-visibility white uniform and cap). Bachmann gets involved with a girl, Helene Brauer (Karin Schroder), who rides her red scooter past his post every morning.

== Plot ==
In the film, Rolf Herricht portrays the traffic policeman Fritz Bachmann in Dresden. Every morning he meets the pretty Helene, who drives across his intersection on her scooter. He doesn't dare speak to her. Finally, she takes the initiative and fakes a small accident in order to start a conversation with him. She is then invited to his traffic training course. Ultimately, both find their way to the registry office together. Conny Odd's setting of the material as a carom was one of the most successful musicals of the GDR's Heiteren Musiktheater. (First performance: September 11, 1969, Theater Gera).

== Cast ==
- Rolf Herricht: Fritz Bachmann
- Karin Schröder: Helene Bräuer
- Marianne Wünscher: Mrs. Messmer
- Gerd Ehlers: Mr. Simmel
- Jochen Thomas: Captain Gabler
- Mathilde Danegger: Mother Hirsch
- Werner Lierck: advertiser
- Carola Braunbock: neighbor
- Peter Dommisch: Lörke
- Siegfried Göhler: officer
- Rudolf Donath: policeman
- Rudolf Fleck: waiter
- Ingeborg Krabbe: secretary
