= Double act =

Pair of comedians whose act is based on their uneven relationship

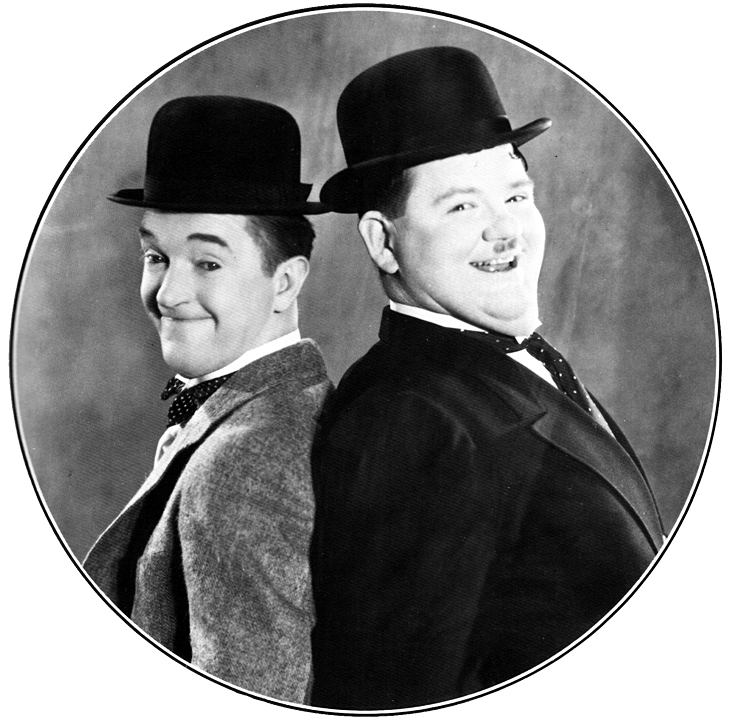
Laurel and Hardy

A double act (also known as a comedy duo) is a form of comedy originating in the English music hall tradition, and American vaudeville, in which two comedians perform together as a single act, often highlighting differences in their characters' personalities. Pairings are typically long-term, in some cases for the artists' entire careers. Double acts perform on the stage, television and film.

The format is particularly popular in England where successful acts have included Peter Cook and Dudley Moore (Cook's deadpan delivery contrasted with Moore's buffoonery), Flanagan and Allen, Morecambe and Wise, The Two Ronnies, Smith and Jones, Fry and Laurie, and French and Saunders, Armstrong and Miller, and Mitchell and Webb. The tradition is also present in the United States with acts like Wheeler & Woolsey, Abbott and Costello, Gallagher and Shean, Burns and Allen, Olsen and Johnson, Lyons and Yosco and Key and Peele. The British-American comedy double act Laurel and Hardy has been described as the most popular in the world.

== Format ==
Humor is often derived from the uneven relationship between two partners, usually of the same gender, age, ethnic origin, and profession but drastically different in terms of personality or behavior; each one serves as a foil to the other. Typically, one member of the duo—the "straight man", "feed", "dead wood", or stooge—is often portrayed as reasonable and serious, while the other one—the funny man, "banana man", or comic—is portrayed as funny, less educated or less intelligent, silly, or unorthodox, although there are also double acts in which neither partner is the straight man or even both. When the audience identifies primarily with one character, the other is often referred to as a comic foil. The term "feed" comes from the way a straight man sets up jokes and then "feeds" them to his partner.

Despite the names often given to the roles, the straight man is not always humorless, nor is it always the comic who provides the act's humor. Sometimes the straight man gets laughs through sarcastic reactions to the comic's antics, such as Stewart Lee's deadpan, reasoned reactions to Richard Herring's ridiculous antics in their pairing. When the straight man serves no specific comic purpose, but acts as a device to make the comic look good, he is known as a stooge. Sometimes considered a derogatory term, "stooge" began to fall out of use by the 1930s with The Three Stooges. Most often the humor in a double act comes from the way the two personalities play off of each other, rather than from the individual players. In many successful acts the roles are interchangeable.

== History ==
=== Early development ===
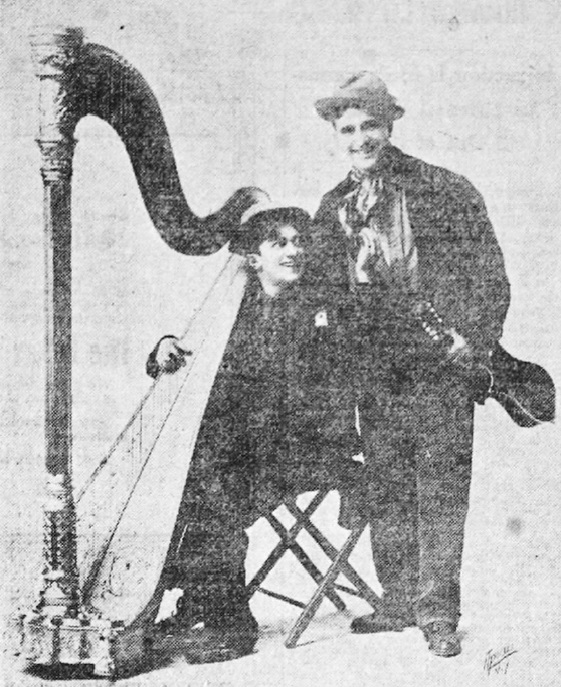
Lyons and Yosco, vaudeville act and ragtime composers from the 1910s

The model for the modern double act began in the English music halls and the American vaudeville scene of the late 19th century. Here, the straight man was needed to repeat the lines of the comic because audiences were noisy. A dynamic soon developed in which the straight man was a more integral part of the act, setting up jokes for the comic to deliver a punch line. Popular draws included acts like George Burns and Gracie Allen (who initially operated with Burns as the comic but quickly switched roles when Gracie's greater appeal was recognized), Abbott and Costello, Flanagan and Allen, Gallagher and Shean, Smith and Dale, and Lyons and Yosco. Occasionally both partners would be comedic or madcap, such as Olsen and Johnson. The dynamic evolved, with Abbott and Costello using a modern and recognizable formula in routines such as Who's on First? in the 1930s and Flanagan and Allen using "cross talking".

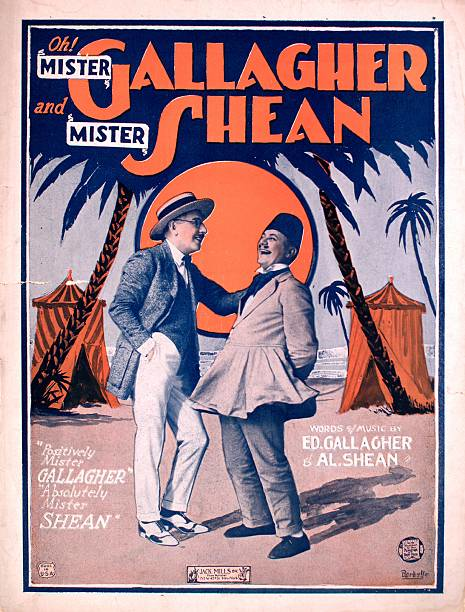
Gallagher and Shean, a popular vaudeville act of the 1920s

Though vaudeville lasted into the 1930s, its popularity waned because of the rise of motion pictures. Some failed to survive the transition to movies and disappeared. By the 1920s, double acts were beginning to attract worldwide fame more readily through the silent era. The comedy was not derived from "cross-talk" or clever verbal exchanges, but through slapstick routines and the actions of the characters.

The first double act to gain worldwide fame through film was the Danish duo Ole & Axel, who made their first film together in 1921. The latter half of the same decade introduced to the world the inimitable team of Laurel and Hardy. The pair had never worked together on stage (they did as of 1940), though both had worked in vaudeville—Stan Laurel with Charlie Chaplin as part of Fred Karno's Army and Oliver Hardy as a singer. Laurel could loosely be described as the comic, though the pair were one of the first not to fit the mold in the way that many double acts do, with both taking a fairly equal share of the laughs. The pair first worked together as a double act in the 1927 film Duck Soup. The first Laurel and Hardy film was called Putting Pants on Philip though their familiar characters had not yet been established. The first film they both appeared in was Lucky Dog in 1921. Laurel and Hardy adapted well to silent films, both being skilled at slapstick, and their nonverbal interplay with each other and the audience became famous—Laurel's cry and Hardy's downtrodden glances to the camera whenever something went wrong—and were carried over to their later talkies. They were one of the few silent acts who made a successful transition to spoken word pictures in the 1930s, showing themselves to be equally adept at verbal wordplay.

=== 1940s–1960s ===
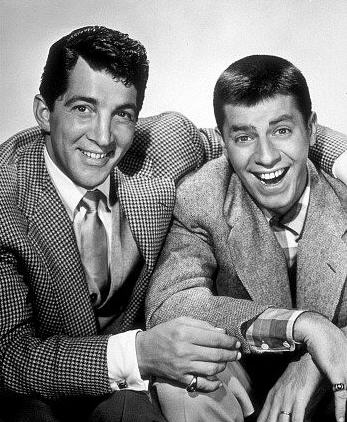
Martin and Lewis

Laurel and Hardy released Saps at Sea, in 1940; it was their final film for long-term producer and collaborator Hal Roach. Later their popularity declined. In 1940s America the double act remained a cinema draw, developing into the "buddy movie" genre, with Abbott and Costello making the transition from stage to screen and the first of Bob Hope and Bing Crosby's Road to... series in 1940. Further acts followed. For example, the first pairing of Dean Martin and Jerry Lewis occurred in 1946. About the same time The Bickersons became popular on radio. Mel Brooks and Carl Reiner started their 2000 Year Old Man recordings and subsequent television appearances in 1961. The genre has continued to exist in cinema while making a successful transition to radio and later TV via The Smothers Brothers and Rowan and Martin's Laugh In.

In England, double acts were confined to theatres and radio until the late 1950s, when double acts such as Morecambe and Wise and Mike and Bernie Winters slowly began the transition to TV on variety shows such as Sunday Night at the London Palladium. These acts came into their own in the mid- to late-1960s. When Morecambe and Wise teamed up with writer Eddie Braben, they began to redefine what was meant by a double act, with Wise, the straight man, being developed into a comic character in his own right. They provided the link between music hall and modern comedy for double acts. As the two leading double acts of the day, Morecambe and Wise and the Winters brothers enjoyed a playful rivalry—the Winters mocked the slight edge Morecambe and Wise had over them in popularity, while Morecambe, when asked what he and Wise would have been if not comedians, replied "Mike and Bernie Winters".

A series of black-and-white films based on Don Camillo and Peppone characters created by the Italian writer and journalist Giovannino Guareschi were made between 1952 and 1965. These were French-Italian coproductions, and starred Fernandel as the Italian priest Don Camillo and Gino Cervi as Giuseppe 'Peppone' Bottazzi, the Communist Mayor of their rural town. The titles are: The Little World of Don Camillo (1952), The Return of Don Camillo (1953), Don Camillo's Last Round (1955), Don Camillo: Monsignor (1961), and Don Camillo in Moscow (1965). The movies were a huge commercial success in their native countries. In 1952, Little World of Don Camillo became the highest-grossing film in both Italy and France, while The Return of Don Camillo was the second most popular film of 1953 at the Italian and French box office.

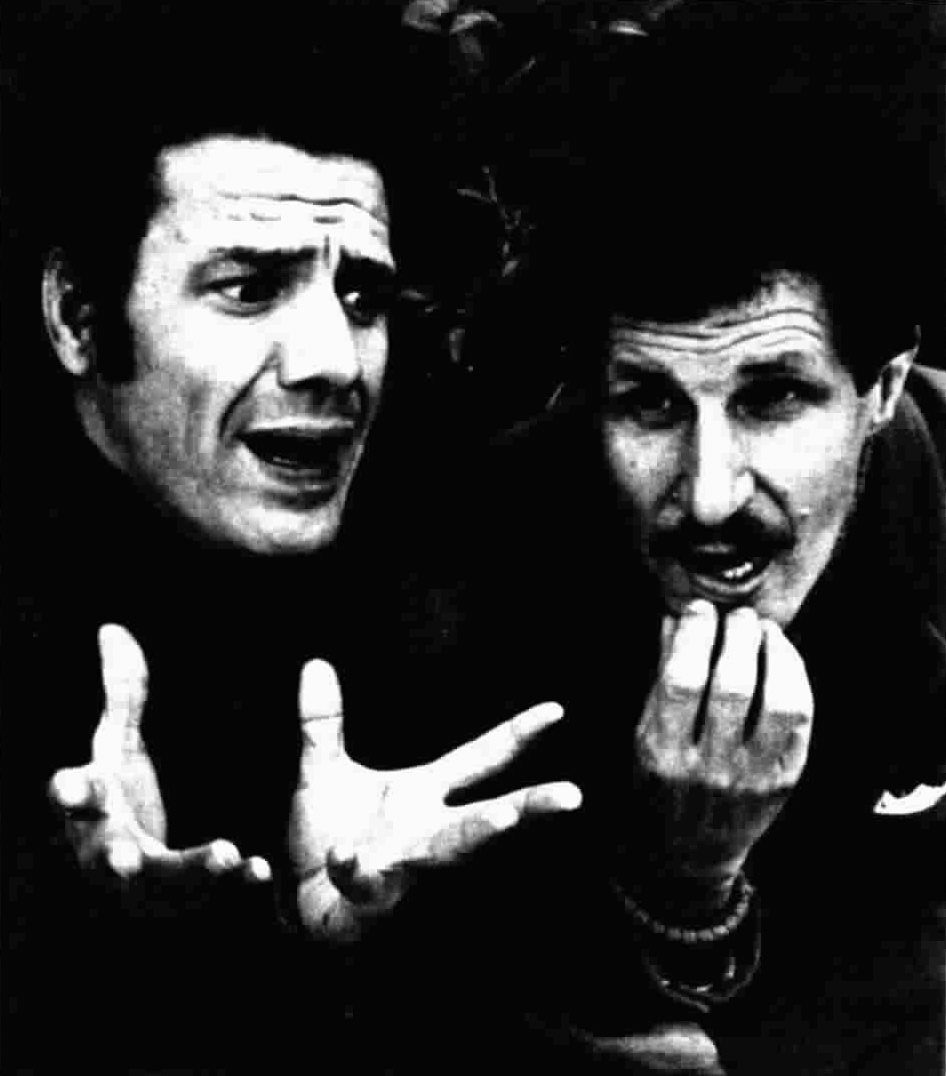
Franco and Ciccio

Franco and Ciccio were a comedy duo formed by Italian actors Franco Franchi (1928–1992) and Ciccio Ingrassia (1922–2003), particularly popular in the 1960s and 1970s. Their collaboration began in 1954 in the theater field, and ended with Franchi's death in 1992. The two made their cinema debuts in 1960 with the film Appuntamento a Ischia. They remained active until 1984 when their last film together, Kaos, was shot, although there were some interruptions in 1973 and from 1975 to 1980. Together, they appeared in 112 films. They acted in films certainly made in a short time and with few means, such as those shot with director Marcello Ciorciolini, sometimes even making a dozen films in a year, often without a real script and where they often improvised on the set. Also are the 13 films directed by Lucio Fulci, who was the architect of the reversal of their typical roles by making Ciccio the serious one, the sidekick, and Franco the comic one. They also worked with important directors such as Pier Paolo Pasolini and the Taviani brothers. Considered at the time as protagonists of B movie, they were subsequently reevaluated by critics for their comedy and creative abilities, becoming the subject of study. The huge success with the public is evidenced by the box office earnings, which in the 1960s, represented 10% of the annual earnings in Italy.

Throughout the 1960s and 1970s, the traditional formula was shunned by The Two Ronnies, who completely dispensed with the need for a straight man, and Peter Cook and Dudley Moore, two Oxbridge-educated comedians who used the double act to deliver satire and edgy comedy.

=== 1970s ===
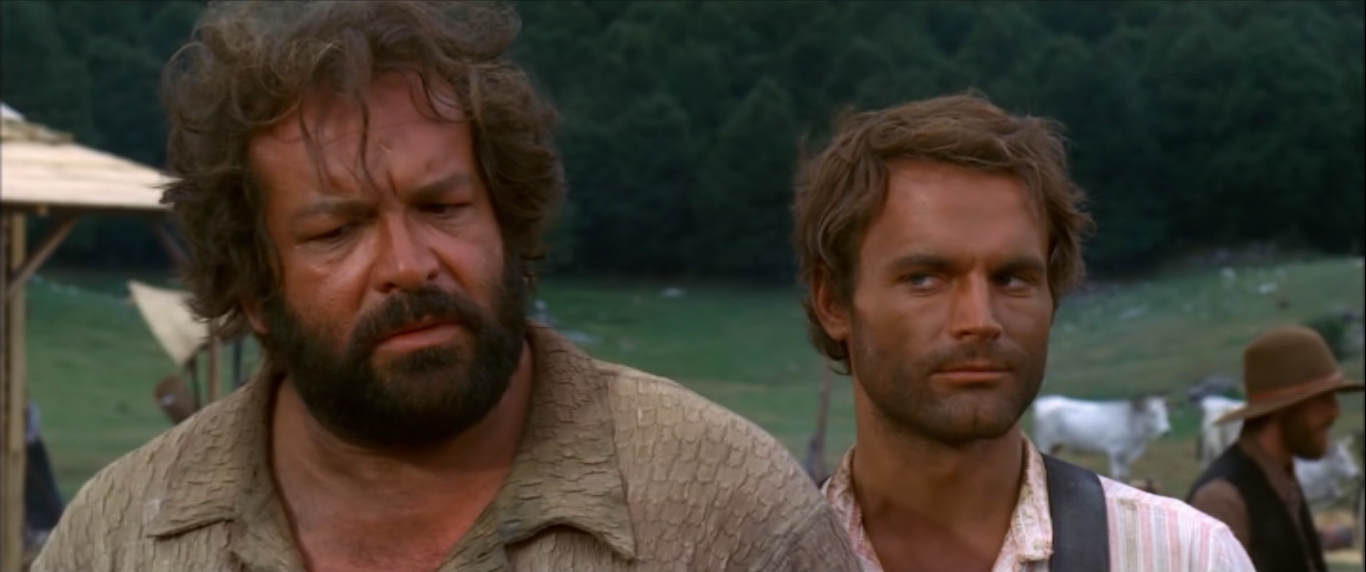
Terence Hill and Bud Spencer

Internationally the most popular double act of the 1970s was the Italian duo Terence Hill and Bud Spencer. The team had already made three straight westerns together during the 1960s but turned their act towards slapstick in their fourth (They Call Me Trinity, 1970), with massive success.

Light entertainment in England in the 1970s was dominated by Morecambe and Wise, who enjoyed impressive ratings, especially on their Christmas specials. Although Mike and Bernie Winters's popularity declined, The Two Ronnies' success grew while Peter Cook and Dudley Moore sporadically produced acclaimed work, in particular, their controversial recordings as Derek and Clive from 1976 to 1978.

The mid-to-late 1970s saw a resurgence in American double acts. Blazing Saddles (1974) featured a memorable performance by Mel Brooks and Harvey Korman (who later teamed up again in Brooks's 1981 follow-up History of the World, Part I). Saturday Night Live, first broadcast in 1975, provided an outlet for comedians to appear in sketches as double acts and continues to do so. It was here that Dan Aykroyd and John Belushi honed their characters The Blues Brothers, who were soon pulled to fame in the 1980 buddy movie of the same name. Gene Wilder and Richard Pryor also embarked on a string of successful buddy films in the 1970s. Cheech & Chong also gained massive popularity during this time.

Occasionally, the straight-man/funny-man dynamic appeared in unexpected contexts between characters not normally thought of as comics. This often appeared in the James T. Kirk (William Shatner)/Mr. Spock (Leonard Nimoy) relationship in several episodes of the original Star Trek series.

=== 1980s ===
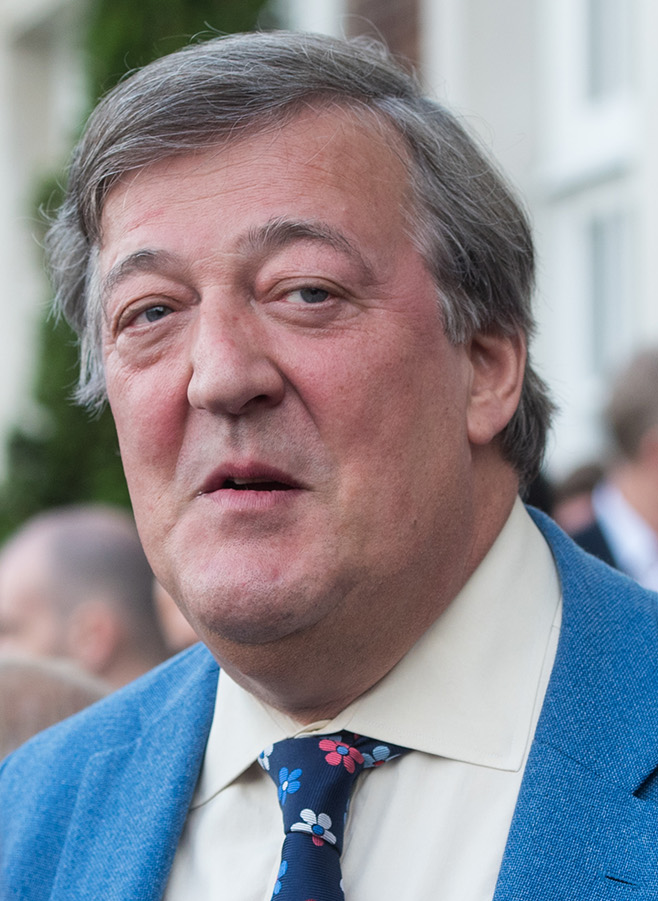
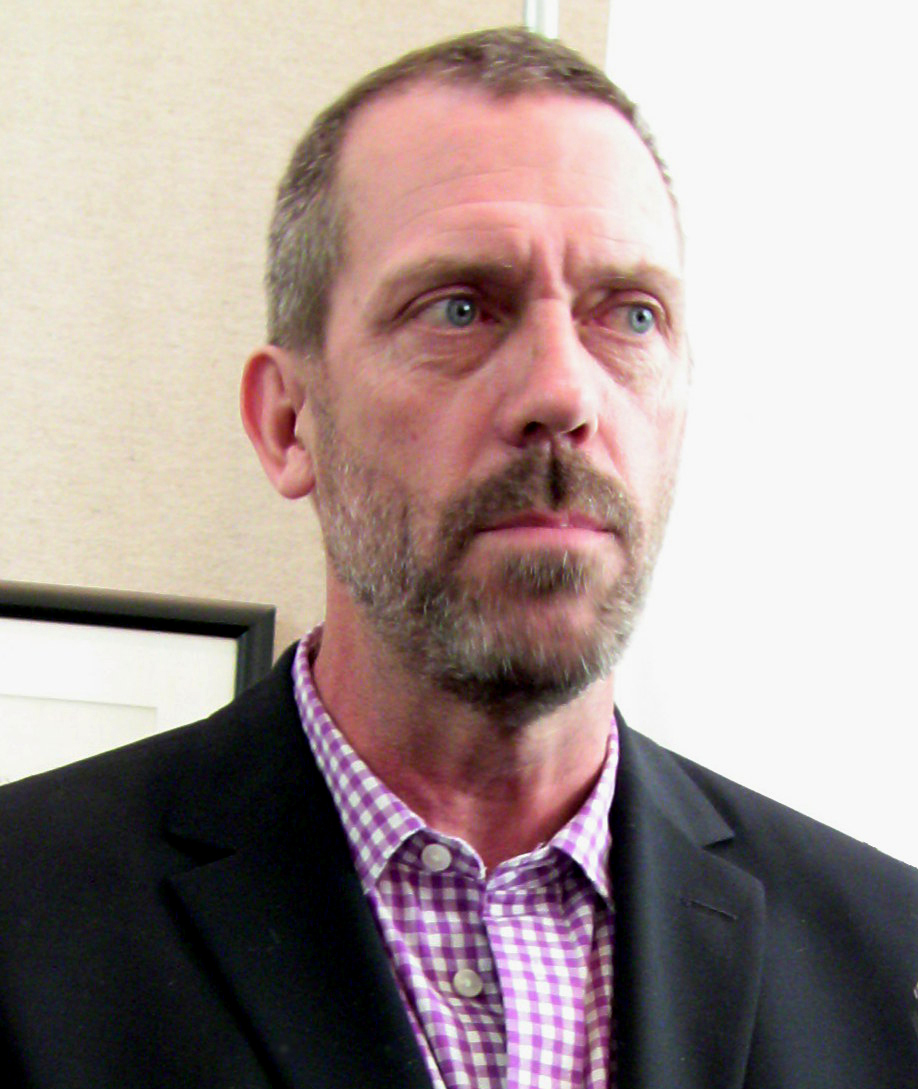
Fry and Laurie

Morecambe and Wise had dominated English light entertainment throughout the 1970s, but their presence waned in the early 1980s. When Morecambe died moments after finishing a solo show in 1984 (his last words were 'I'm glad that's over'), the best-loved double act in English comedy came to an end, and several new acts emerged. The two distinct groups could not have been more different.

In the wake of Not the Nine O'Clock News, The Young Ones and the breakthrough onto television of "alternative comedy" came French and Saunders; Fry and Laurie; Rik Mayall and Ade Edmondson; Hale and Pace; and Smith and Jones. These edgier comics were brasher and crude—comedy's answer to punk rock. They developed the satire and vulgarity of Peter Cook and Dudley Moore rather than the more gentle humour of Morecambe and Wise and The Two Ronnies. In fact, Smith and Jones showed blatant disregard for their predecessors, openly mocking the Two Ronnies (this may have been a factor in Ronnie Barker's decision to retire from comedy in the late 1980s).

=== 1990s–present day ===
The early 1990s saw comedy become "the new rock and roll" in England; this was inherent in the work of Newman and Baddiel and Punt and Dennis on The Mary Whitehouse Experience. Newman and Baddiel, in particular, symbolized this rock and roll attitude by playing the biggest ever UK comedy gig at Wembley Arena . With this came tension . Newman and Baddiel fell out with Punt and Dennis, not wishing to share screen time with them, and then with each other . David Baddiel went on to form another successful double act with Frank Skinner.

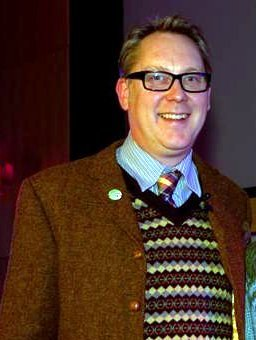
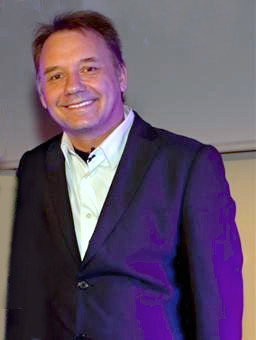
Reeves and Mortimer

The 1990s saw the emergence of the comedy double act Reeves and Mortimer. Their work often deconstructed conventions of light entertainment while drawing on elements of traditional double acts. For example, Vic Reeves performed an impression of Eric Morecambe on Vic Reeves Big Night Out. Their comedy combined surreal and idiosyncratic humour with traditional double-act routines, and their later work incorporated more violent slapstick.

Another double act that emerged in the mid to late 1990s was Lee & Herring, who combined a classic clash of personalities (downbeat and rational Lee contrasting with energetic, childish Herring) with very ironic, often satirical humour.

Also appearing in the latter half of the decade were Adam and Joe, whose low-budget, self-produced Channel 4 series The Adam and Joe Show was a very sharp combination of TV and movie parodies and satirical looks at various elements of youth culture.

Indian cinema also had its share of the double act, with Tamil cinema comedians Goundamani and Senthil teaming up for several films throughout the decade, similarly Kota Srinivasa Rao and Babu Mohan in Telugu cinema.

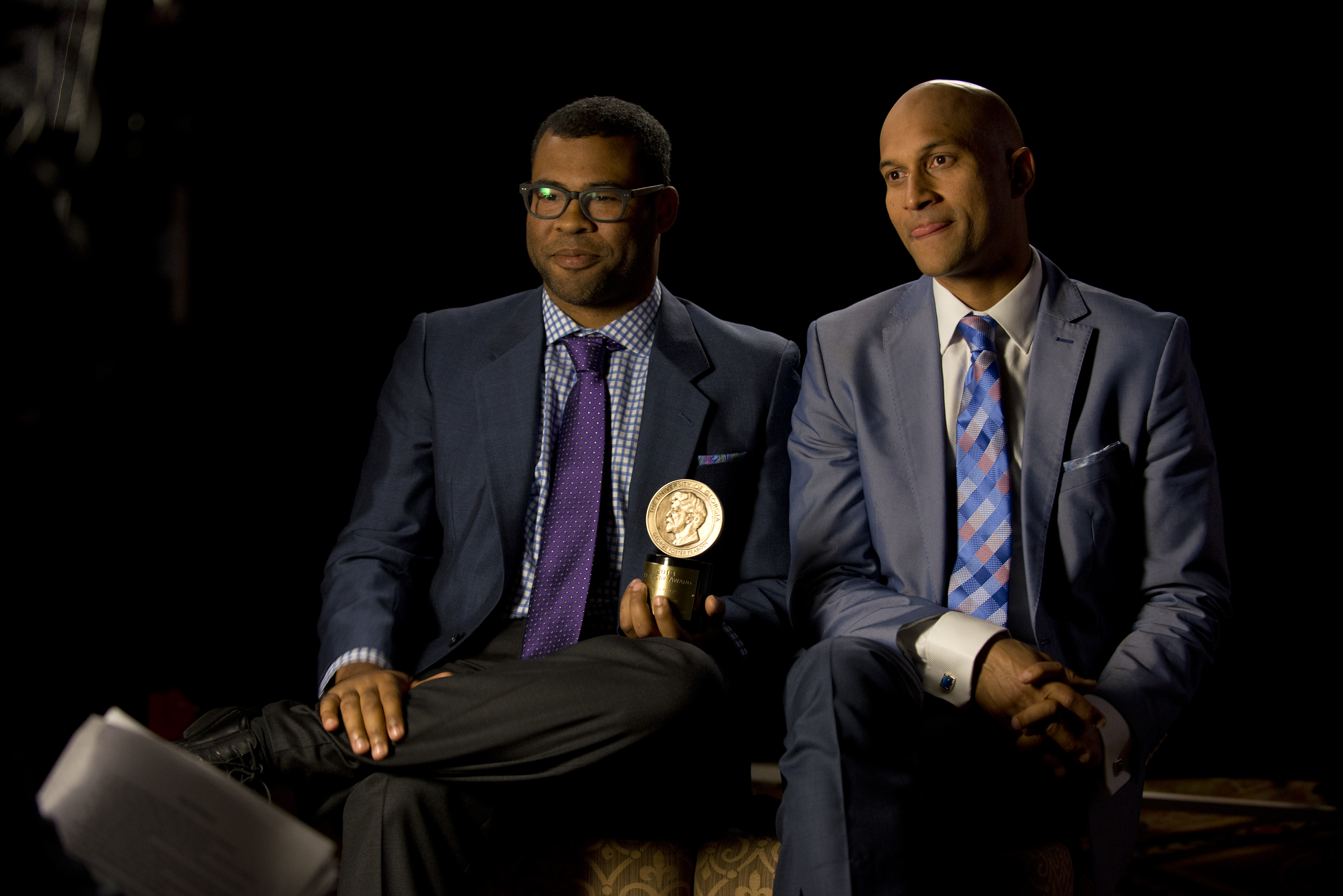
Key & Peele

The British duo Mitchell and Webb are another successful double act from the 2000s onwards, having multiple sketch shows on both radio and TV as well as starring in the award-winning sitcom Peep Show.

For over 20 years, Australians Hamish Blake and Andy Lee have worked together as Hamish & Andy, having multiple TV shows and a radio show and podcast.

Most of the most successful double acts in the early 2000s take their inspiration from the odder strain of double-act comedy spearheaded by Reeves and Mortimer. Matt Lucas and David Walliams, who had previously worked with Reeves and Mortimer, also took inspiration from the Two Ronnies. The Mighty Boosh also played with the formula but essentially remained traditional at their roots. Another popular current light entertainment/presenting comedy act is Ant & Dec, a basic example of a double act.

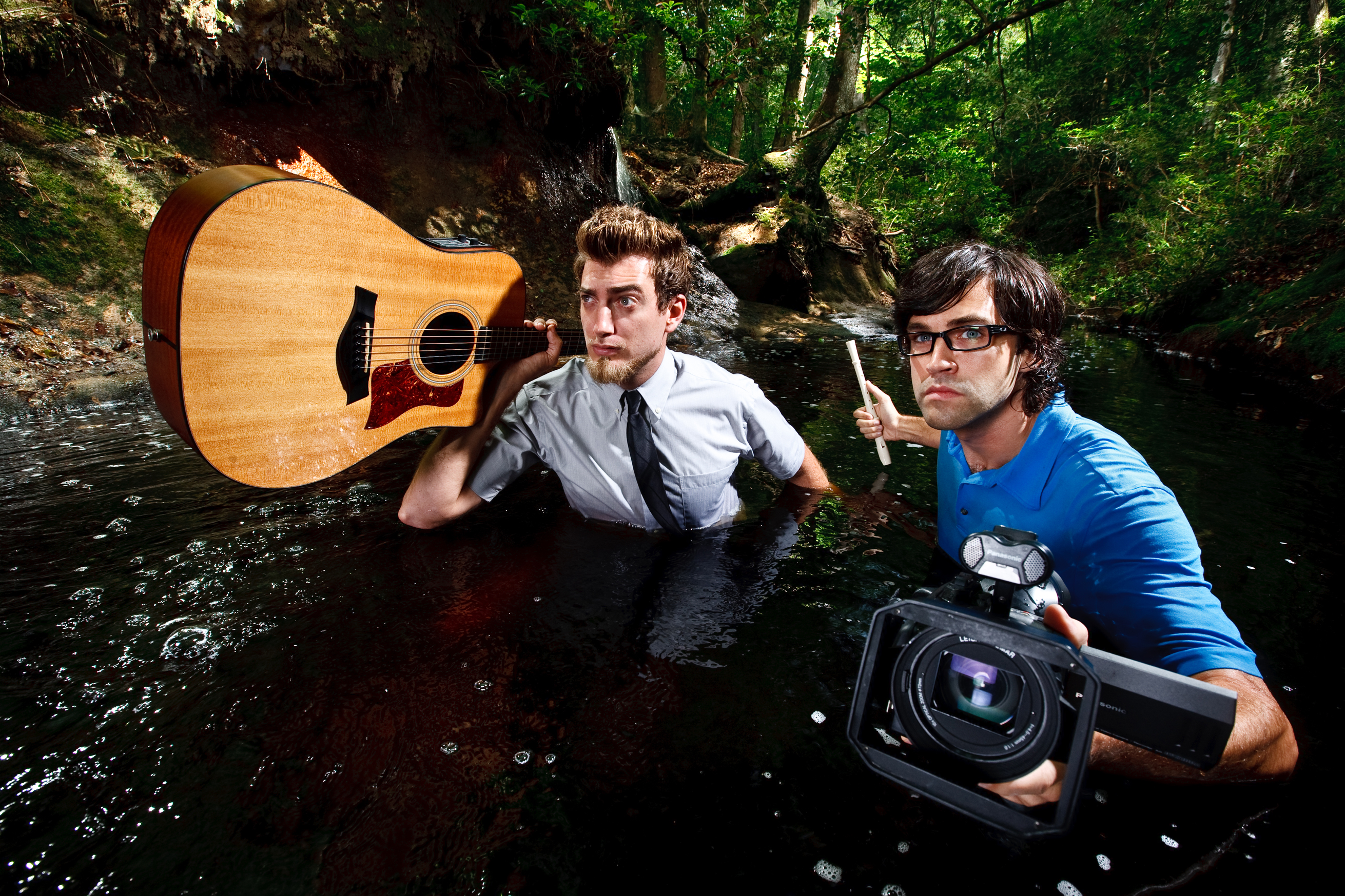
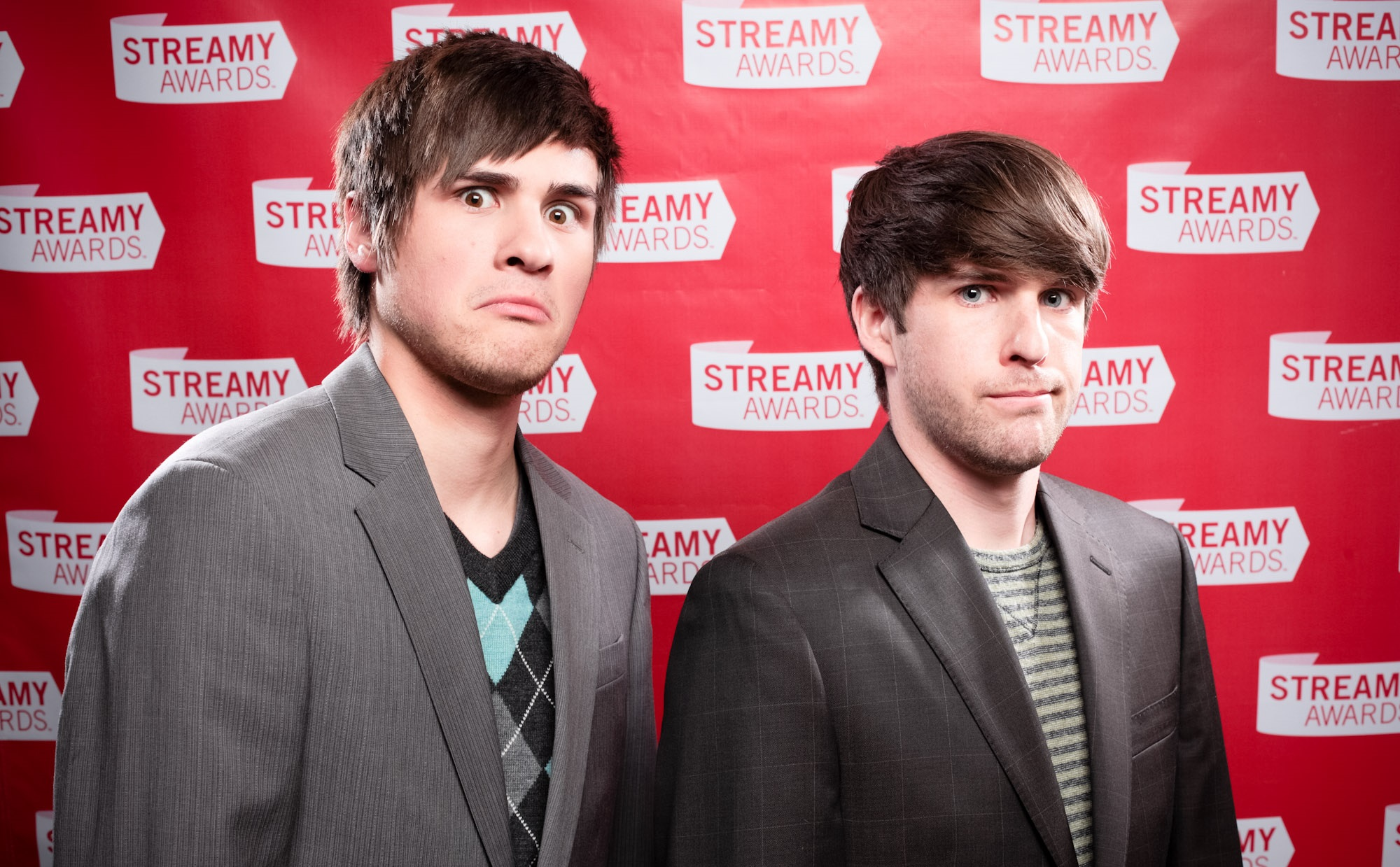
Rhett & Link and Smosh, internet based duos

In early 2012, comedians Keegan-Michael Key and Jordan Peele appeared in a sketch comedy TV show titled Key & Peele airing on Comedy Central.

Many modern-day YouTube channels follow this format. Some examples include Smosh, Dan and Phil, the Game Grumps, and Rhett and Link of the YouTube channel Good Mythical Morning.

== England ==
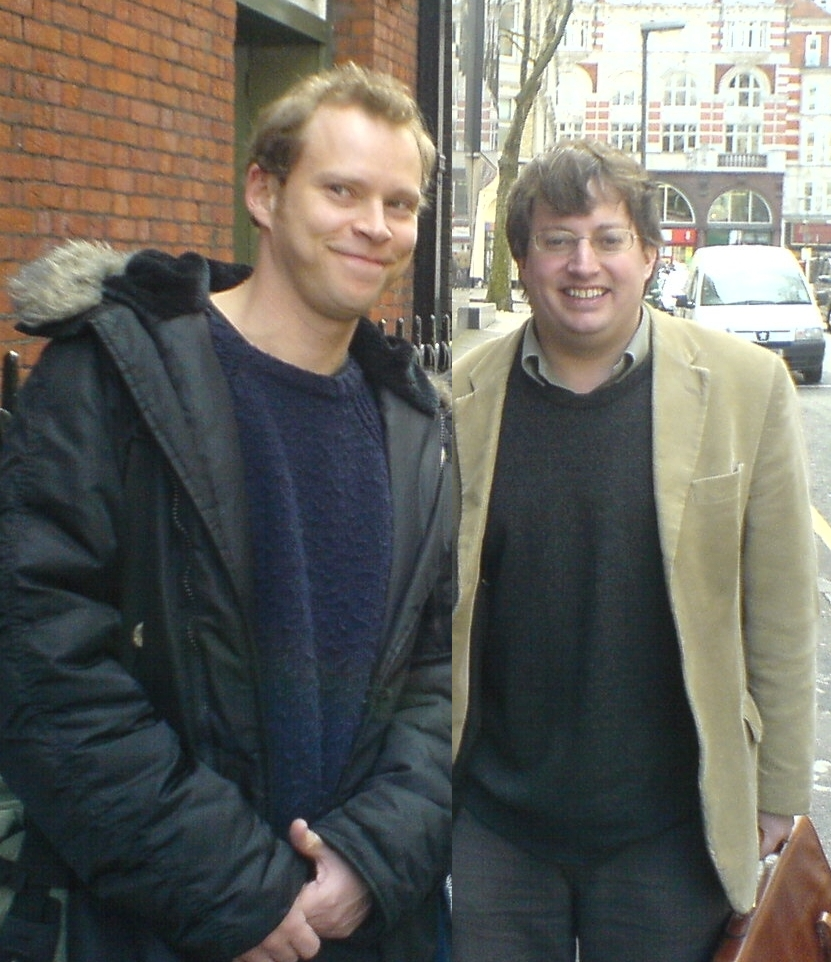
Mitchell and Webb

In its English form, the two actors would usually be composed of a "straight man" or "feed" and a "comic." The purpose of the feed is to set up jokes for the comic. This would rely heavily on comic timing.

Morecambe and Wise are arguably the quintessential English double act . They followed the traditional formula with Eric Morecambe as the comic and Ernie Wise as the feed. Other English acts such as The Two Ronnies, Hale and Pace, Vic and Bob, French and Saunders, Mitchell and Webb, Fry and Laurie, Ant & Dec, Punt and Dennis, Lee and Herring, Armstrong and Miller, Peacock and Gamble and Dick and Dom display the role of "comic" and "straight man" in a less obvious, largely interchangeable way or are dispensed with altogether. More obvious English examples of the comic-feed dynamic are Cannon and Ball, Little and Large or the children's entertainers The Chuckle Brothers, where the straight man acted largely as a humourless set up for the comic.

Peter Cook and Dudley Moore were perhaps the first double act to go against the grain and turned their double act into a complex analysis of their relationship . In many of the sketches (especially the Pete and Dud exchanges) Cook played the domineering know-it-all (who knows nothing) and Moore the put-upon dimwit (who also knows nothing).

This dominance was accentuated by the difference in height between the two, and the speed of Cook's mind, which meant that he could ad lib and force Moore to corpse in a Pete and Dud dialogue, leaving him helpless to respond. As the partnership progressed into the often-improvised Derek and Clive dialogues , these light-hearted attempts to make Moore laugh became, as a result of Cook's growing insecurity and alcoholism, aggressive attacks on the defenseless Moore . Carrying the tradition of going against the grain of traditional double acts, when the partnership dissolved in the late 1970s, it was Cook whose career stalled due to boredom, alcoholism and lack of ambition, while Moore went on to become one of Hollywood's most unlikely leading men .

English actors Patrick Stewart and Ian McKellen developed a double act as part of their starring roles in the American X-Men film series. The working relationship eventually carried over onto the stage, as both appeared in productions of Waiting for Godot and No Man's Land, to critical acclaim.

=== Sitcoms ===
The double act has become a popular theme in English sitcoms. One of the earliest examples of this was the relationship between Tony Hancock and Sid James in the Galton and Simpson series Hancock's Half Hour. James played a down-to-earth character while Hancock was pompous and had delusions of grandeur, and the comedy was derived from the two playing off each other's characteristics.

A common trend in sitcoms is to place the double act in a situation where they are forced together through uncontrollable circumstance. In another Galton and Simpson production, Steptoe and Son, a son, with great ambition, was forced to live with his elderly, manipulative father as a rag and bone man. The comedy derives from the way the characters interact in their tempestuous relationship. The series also has more heart-rending moments as the son despairs at his inability to escape his needy, selfish, grasping father.

Porridge saw "an habitual criminal", Fletcher (played by Ronnie Barker, already famous for his comedy partnership with Ronnie Corbett) and a young, naive, first-time prisoner, Lennie Godber. The two would bicker but endured a relationship of mutual respect. Barker also formed a partnership with David Jason in Open All Hours, with Jason playing Granville while Barker played Albert Arkwright. Many don't see this as a comedy duo, but the straight-man element coupled with Barker's funny-man antics on the show are still compressed into the script.

Rik Mayall and Ade Edmondson combined their success in sitcoms (The Young Ones) and as a double act (The Dangerous Brothers) in 1991 when they created Bottom. Their characters are a pair of sad, pathetic losers forced together by their mutual hopelessness. However, unlike earlier examples of such, the characters in Bottom absolutely hate each other, exacerbating their despair. This often leads to slapstick violence, such as hitting each other with frying pans. Mayall and Edmonson have said Bottom aimed to be more than just a series of toilet gags—it was meant to be a cruder cousin to plays like Waiting for Godot about the pointlessness of life.

Other popular double acts in English sitcoms include complex relationships involving status and superiority themes: in Dad's Army, the social climbing envy of Captain George Mainwaring, to his right-hand man (Sergeant Arthur Wilson) who is of higher status than him; and in Red Dwarf, the working class everyman Dave Lister to the middle class but socially-awkward Arnold Rimmer. However, the most prominent double act is that of an intelligent person and his inferior sidekick, such as Basil and Manuel of Fawlty Towers, Blackadder and Baldrick of Blackadder, or Ted and Father Dougal of the Irish sitcom Father Ted.

In recent years, double acts as sitcoms appear to have gone full circle, as illustrated by the cult success of The Mighty Boosh. For the relationship between the two main characters this series uses a formula very similar to that between Sid and Tony in Hancock's Half Hour – that of an arrogant character whose best friend can see his faults and keeps him grounded. A similar dynamic is used in Peep Show in which the characters of Mitchell and Webb were adapted for the sitcom formula. In this case both characters have a degree of egotism. The difference between the pair is the free-spirited, uneducated and selfishness of Jeremy and the intellectual arrogance but shyness of Mark .

== United States and Canada ==
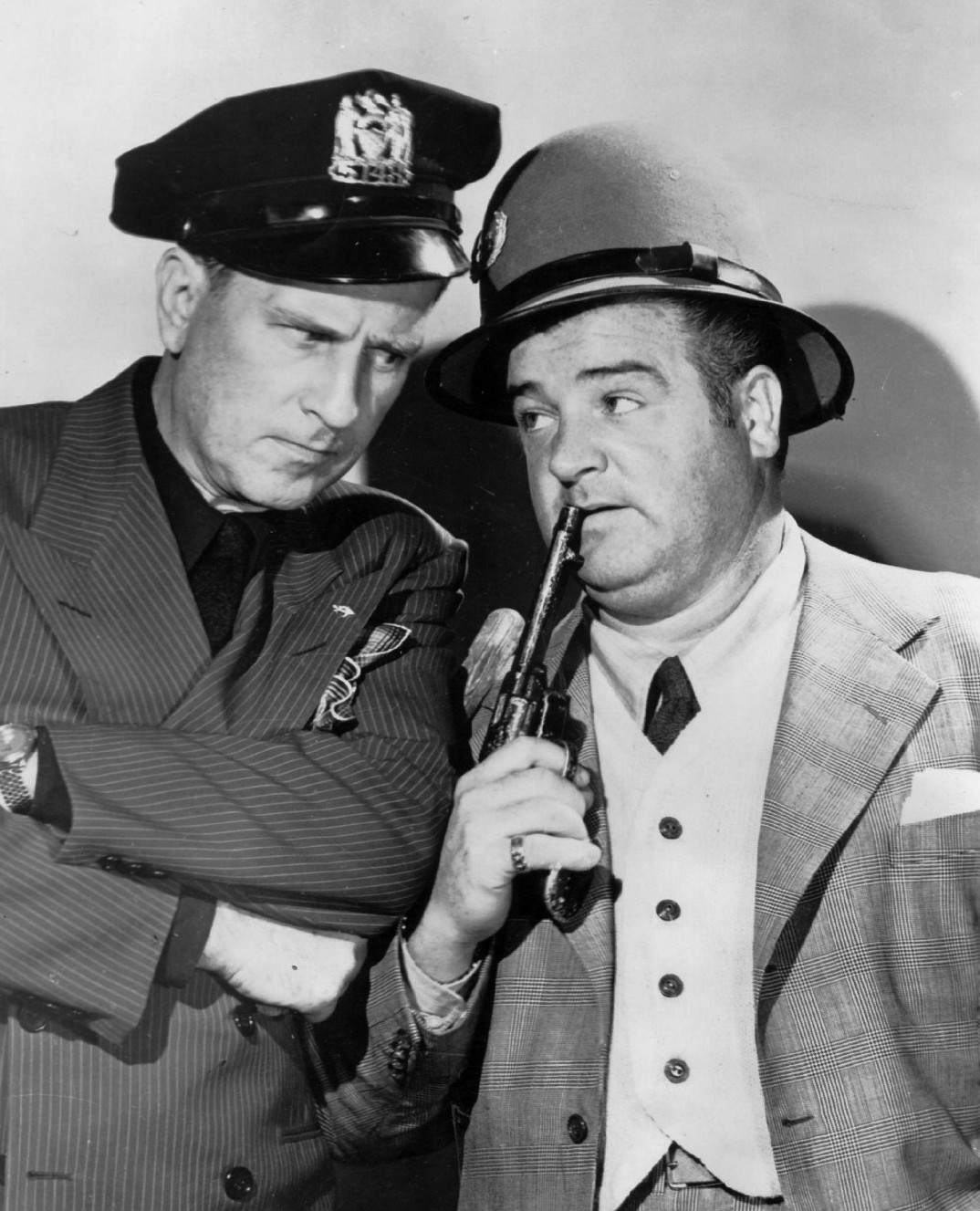
Abbott and Costello

In the United States and Canada, the tradition was more popular in the earlier part of the 20th century with vaudeville-derived acts such as Laurel and Hardy, Abbott and Costello, Burns and Allen, Jackie Gleason and Art Carney, Wheeler & Woolsey, Olsen and Johnson, and Lyons and Yosco and continuing into the television age with Martin and Lewis, Kenan & Kel, Bob and Ray, the Smothers Brothers, Wayne and Shuster, Allen and Rossi, Jack Burns and Avery Schreiber, Bert and Ernie, Rowan and Martin, Mike Nichols and Elaine May, the Wayans Brothers, Stewie Griffin and Brian Griffin from Family Guy and Shawn and Gus in Psych. The series I Love Lucy was known for its double acts, and Lucille Ball served as foil to both her husband Desi Arnaz and to Vivian Vance. Vance could also serve as foil to William Frawley when the situation required. Vance and Ball would again serve as a double act in their next series The Lucy Show. More recently, the model has been largely supplanted by that of the "buddy movie" genre, which has introduced several notable comedy partnerships not formally billed as a single "act" in the traditional manner. The earliest example of such a team may have been Bob Hope and Bing Crosby; later examples include Gene Wilder and Richard Pryor, Burt Reynolds and Dom DeLuise, Dan Aykroyd and John Belushi, Corey Haim and Corey Feldman, David Spade and Chris Farley and child stars Drake Bell and Josh Peck. Based on the gag-man/straight-man concept, "Stoner" duos like Cheech & Chong, Jay & Silent Bob, and Harold & Kumar have also proven quite popular with audiences. The double act format can also be used in presenting noncomedic information in an entertaining manner, such as Savage/Hyneman pair of the Discovery Channel's MythBusters (which Savage stated was unintentional when they began the series but naturally grew into a double act as the result of their own conflicting personalities). From 2006 to 2010, Apple used the double-act formula successfully in its popular series of I'm a Mac/And I'm a PC ads with John Hodgman and Justin Long.

== Italy ==
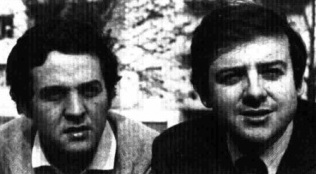
Cochi e Renato in 1972

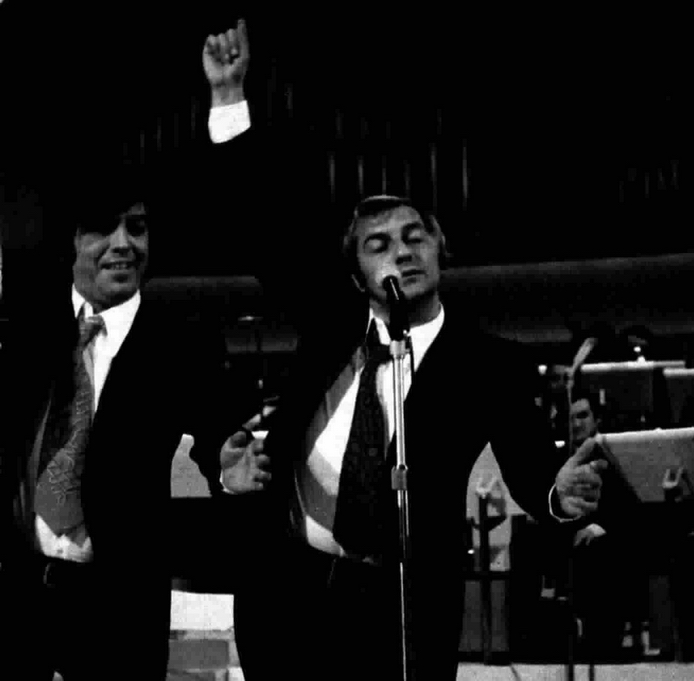
Ric e Gian in 1972

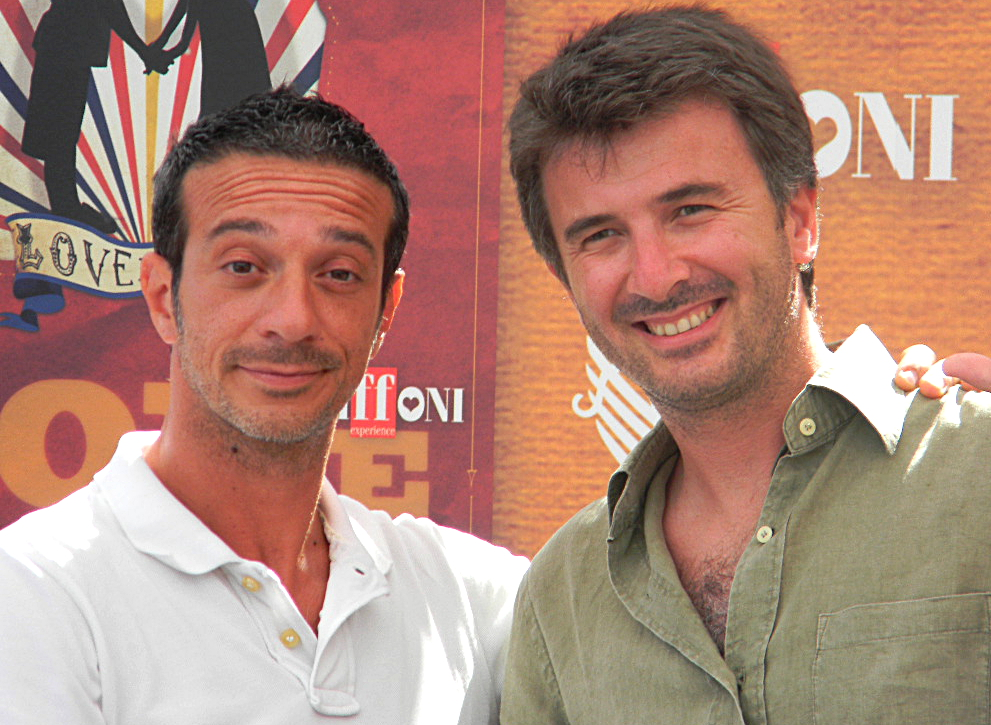
Ficarra e Picone at the 2010 Giffoni Film Festival

In Italy the tradition was more popular in the late part of the 20th century with Battaglia & Miseferi, Cochi e Renato, Ficarra e Picone, Fichi d'India, Gigi e Andrea, Katia & Valeria, Lillo & Greg, Pio e Amedeo, and Ric e Gian. Cochi e Renato were childhood friends, and they grew accustomed to perform together in front of an audience of friends and relatives. Their professional debut took place in 1965 in the small cabaret club Cab 64 in Milan, where they performed along with Lino Toffolo and Bruno Lauzi. They were also joined by Enzo Jannacci and Felice Andreasi with whom they formed the comedy ensemble Motore, who had a good success in Milan. The couple became first known in the late 1960s thanks to the RAI innovative variety shows Quelli della domenica (1968) and È domenica, ma senza impegno (1969). Characterized by a peculiar comic verve, filled with paradoxical and surreal moods, their popularity increased in the early 1970s with the variety show Il poeta e il contadino and with the participation with the musical show Canzonissima. The couple began to crack in 1974, when Renato started devoting himself to a full-time film career. After a long separation, Cochi e Renato reunited in 2000s for a series of television and stage projects. Cochi e Renato were also very active as singer-songwriters (often with the collaboration of Enzo Jannacci), and they had several commercial hits; their most successful song is "E la vita la vita", which reached the first place at the Italian charts in 1974.

Ric e Gian met in an avanspettacolo at the Teatro Maffei in Turin, where Ric worked as a dancer and Gian was the sidekick of the actor Mario Ferrero. They then decided to performing together as Jerry e Fabio and worked in various theaters, nights and cabarets in Northern Italy as well as at the Crazy Horse in Paris. Noted by film producer Angelo Rizzoli, they renamed themselves Ric e Gian in 1962 and made their film debut in Ischia operazione amore (1966). Starting from the late 1960s, the couple gained popularity thanks to their participation in several prime time RAI variety shows. In the mid-1970s they focused on theatre, and between late 1970s and early 1980s their popularity revamped thanks to a number of Antenna 3 and Fininvest television shows they took part in. In 1987 the couple split to pursue some solo projects, before briefly reuniting between 2002 and 2006 for a number of stage shows and plays.

Gigi e Andrea started performing together in small theaters, cabarets and hostelries in Bologna in the second half of the 1970s. They debuted in 1978 on the Rai 1 variety show Io e la Befana. The year before they had appeared for the first time on TV in A modo mio, directed by Memo Remigi. In the 1980s, the couple starred and co-starred in several comedy films which were usually badly received by critics but of commercial success. The same period, their presence on the small screen also became more intense, especially on Fininvest variety shows and television films. In the 1990s, having reached a more than respectable success, the couple split in order to pursue solo projects.

Ficarra e Picone started in 1993 along with Salvatore Borrello as a comedy trio, performing together on stage as "Chiamata Urbana Urgente". In 1998, the two remaining members began to use their surnames: Ficarra & Picone. In 2000, Ficarra e Picone made their film debut with Ask Me If I'm Happy by Aldo, Giovanni & Giacomo, and two years later they made the first film as main actors, Nati stanchi. On 25 April 2005, Ficarra and Picone were the TV anchor-men four episodes of Striscia la notizia to which they collaborated from 27 March 2006 up to 5 December 2020. In 2007 they debuted as directors alongside Gianbattista Avellino with the film Il 7 e l'8, for which they were nominated to David di Donatello for Best New Director and to Silver Ribbon in the same category. Also in 2007 they were featured as comic characters in the story Zio Paperone e il rapimento teatrale (trad. Uncle Scrooge and the Theatrical Kidnapping), published in the issue 2678 of Topolino.

== China ==
In China, xiangsheng (also known as crosstalk) is a traditional comedic performance usually in the form of a dialogue between two performers.

== Japan ==
In Japan the manzai tradition parallels that of the double act. Here there is a distinguished straight man (tsukkomi) and funny man (boke) and the humor consists of quick slapstick jokes, comical stories and social misunderstandings.

== Germany ==
In Germany Tünnes and Schäl (since 1803/1850s), two Cologne puppet theater characters, fit to the concept of fool and straight man.

During WWII Tran and Helle appeared in a number of short films to deter Germans from actions detrimental to Germany's war effort or security.

Between 1950 and 1980, the most popular comedy duo of East Germany, Herricht & Preil, ran a very successful double act; Hans-Joachim Preil is the straight man and Rolf Herricht is the comic.

== Notable examples ==
=== Film double acts ===
- Abbott and Costello
- Bob Hope and Bing Crosby
- Cheech & Chong
- Laurel and Hardy
- Katharine Hepburn and Spencer Tracy
- Terence Hill and Bud Spencer

=== Australia ===
- Hamish & Andy
- The Inspired Unemployed
- Lano and Woodley
- Merrick and Rosso
- Roy and HG

=== Italy ===
- Franco and Ciccio

=== United Kingdom ===
- Ant & Dec
- Armstrong and Miller
- Barry and Stuart
- Cannon and Ball
- Derek and Clive
- French and Saunders
- Fry and Laurie
- Hale and Pace
- Hinge and Bracket
- Little and Large
- Mel and Sue
- Mitchell and Webb
- Morecambe and Wise
- Newman and Baddiel
- The Pin
- Punt and Dennis
- Smith and Jones
- The Two Ronnies
- Vic and Bob

=== United States ===
- Bert and Ernie
- Butterbeans and Susie
- Gallagher and Shean
- Garfunkel and Oates
- Two Black Crows
- Jack Lemmon and Walter Matthau
- Jake and Amir
- Jay and Silent Bob
- Mr. and Mrs. Jimmy Barry
- Key & Peele
- Lum and Abner
- Martin and Lewis
- The Mommies
- Nichols and May
- Ninja Sex Party
- Penn & Teller
- Primrose and West
- Sklar Brothers
- Smith and Dale
- Sonny & Cher
- Stiller and Meara
- Tim & Eric
- The Umbilical Brothers
- Trixie and Katya
- Uncle Cyp and Aunt Sap Brasfield
- Wheeler & Woolsey

=== New Zealand ===
- Flight of the Conchords

=== Norway ===
- Ylvis
