= Meine Freundin Sybille =

1967 film

- Directed by: Wolfgang Luderer
- Release date: 1967
- Country: East Germany
- Language: German

Meine Freundin Sybille is an East German film. It was released in 1967.

== Cast ==
- Rolf Herricht: Hurtig
- Hanns-Michael Schmidt: Ronny
- Evelyn Opoczynski: Sybille
- Eva-Maria Hagen: Helena
- Helga Göring: Mrs. Mücke
- Arthur Jopp: Sybille's father
- Marianne Behrens: Sybille's mother
- Wolfgang Luderer: director
- Gerlind Ahnert: director's wife
- Rolf Ripperger: Dr. Meier
- Klaus Bergatt: Benno
- Erika Stiska: Mrs. Siebenzahl
- Hanna Rieger: Mrs. Fülve
- Hans-Joachim Preil: chief guide
- Werner Lierck: guide
- Willi Narloch: taxi driver
- Hubert Hoelzke: Hubert
