= Hans-Joachim Preil =

East German comedian

- Born: June 26, 1923; Köslin, Weimar Republic
- Died: November 2, 1999 (aged 76); Berlin, Federal Republic of Germany
- Occupations: comedian, actor
- Years active: 1939 - 1991

Hans-Joachim Preil (June 26, 1923 – November 2, 1999) was an East German comedian.

== Biography ==
Preil begun studying acting at 1939. He later appeared on the stages of theaters in Quedlinburg, Aschersleben, Bernburg and Magdeburg. During 1951, he met fellow actor Rolf Herricht. The two founded a comedy duo, 'Herricht & Preil', making their first sketch, 'The Chess Match', in 1953. In their act, Herricht was the 'comic' while Preil served as the 'straight man'. During the 1950s, Preil worked as artistic director in the theaters of Magdeburg and Bernburg, while continuing to perform in sketches with Herricht. By 1959, Deutscher Fernsehfunk had broadcast one of their acts, which was highly successful with the audience. They began appearing regularly on television, and turned to the most recognized comedians of the German Democratic Republic.

During the 1960s, the pair appeared in two DEFA comedy films the plots of which centered around their comical skills. The first -- Hands Up, Or I'll Shoot (1966) -- portrayed Herricht as a mentally unstable detective called Holmes and Preil as an antique expert. It was banned by the 11th Plenum of the Socialist Unity Party of Germany which deemed that it was critical of the law enforcement system. The film finally was released in 2009. The second, My Friend Sybille (1967), presented the two as junior and senior travel guides in a cruise at the Black Sea.

In addition to his acting career, Preil also worked as an assistant-director in the Babelsberg Studios of DEFA, and wrote several plays for theater.

Preil was awarded the Art Prize of the German Democratic Republic on 13 May 1977.

After Herricht's death in 1981, Preil stopped appearing in comedy live sketches, but continued directing and playing on television. He retired in 1991. At 1998, he received the Golden Hen Award for Lifetime Achievement, in the presence of President Roman Herzog.

== Filmography ==
As actor
- 1961 Das Stacheltier - Mit der NATO durch die Wand
- 1961 Mord an Rathenau (TV movie)
- 1961 Justizmord (TV movie)
- 1961 Geheime Front durchbrochen (TV series)
- 1961 Der Tag des Ludger Snoerrebrod (TV movie)
- 1962 Hulla di Bulla (TV movie)
- 1962 Eva und der neue Adam (TV movie)
- 1962 Kubinke (TV movie)
- 1962 Geheime Fäden (TV movie)
- 1962 Tempel des Satans (TV movie)
- 1962/II Der tolle Tag (TV movie)
- 1963 Der Talisman (TV movie)
- 1963 Der arme Jonathan (TV movie)
- 1964 Schlafwagen Paris-München (TV movie)
- 1964 Ein Mann für meine Frau (TV movie)
- 1966 Blaulicht (TV series)
- 1966/2009 Hände hoch oder ich schieße
- 1967-1976 Der Staatsanwalt hat das Wort (TV series)
- 1967 Meine Freundin Sybille
- 1969 Tolle Tage (TV movie)
- 1969 Die Rosenholzmöbel (TV movie)
- 1970 Unser Haus steht Kopp (TV movie)
- 1971 Pygmalion XII (TV movie)
- 1971 Salut Germain (TV series)
- 1974 Alle Haare wieder (TV movie)
- 1977 DEFA-Disko 77
- 1977 Pension Schöller (TV movie)
- 1978 Ich bin nicht meine Tante (TV movie)
- 1979 Kille, kille Händchen (TV movie)
- 1979 Die Rache des Kapitäns Mitchell (TV movie)
- 1979 Irrtum ausgeschlossen (TV movie)
- 1980 Niemand liebt dich - wieso ich? (TV movie)
- 1980 Der Keiler von Keilsberg (TV movie)
- 1981 Martin XIII. (TV movie)
- 1982 Schöne Aussichten (TV movie)
- 1983 Der Angler auf dem Dach (TV movie)
- 1985 Die Leute von Züderow (TV series)
- 1986-1989 Ferienheim Bergkristall (TV series)
- 1987 Kleine Fische (TV movie)
- 1990 Wenn du groß bist, lieber Adam

As writer

- 1960 2 x Madeleine (TV movie)
- 1969 Tolle Tage (TV movie)
- 1970 Unser Haus steht Kopp (TV movie)
- 1974 Alle Haare wieder (TV movie)
- 1977 DEFA-Disko 77
- 1979 Tatzeit 19.00 Uhr (TV movie)
- 1980 Ja, so ein Mann bin ich! (TV movie)
- 1981 Doppelt gebacken (TV movie)
- 1982 Wo gibt's denn so was? (TV movie)
- 1983 Haste Töne (TV movie)
- 1984-1989 Ferienheim Bergkristall (TV series)

As assistant director

- 1961 Der Arzt von Bothenow

As director

- 1979 Tatzeit 19.00 Uhr (TV movie)
- 1980 Ja, so ein Mann bin ich! (TV movie)
- 1981 Doppelt gebacken (TV movie)
- 1982 Wo gibt's denn so was? (TV movie)
- 1983 Haste Töne (TV movie)
- 1984-1989 Ferienheim Bergkristall (TV series)
