= Der Reserveheld =

1965 film

- Directed by: Wolfgang Luderer
- Release date: 1965
- Country: East Germany
- Language: German

Der Reserveheld is an East German comedy film. It was released in 1965 and starred Rolf Herricht and Marita Böhme.
