= Ottokar Domma =

Ottokar Domma (pseudonym; properly Otto Häuser) (20 May 1924, Karlovy Vary, Czechoslovakia – 15 July 2007, Woltersdorf) was a German journalist and writer specialising in satire. He was most famous for his series on adventures of a semi-fictional East German schoolboy named Ottokar Domma. Domma is in parts the younger alter ego of Häuser.

== Pseudonym ==
Häuser's last name means 'houses' in German language; domma or doma (Russian: дома) means the same in Russian language.
