= Rolf Herricht =

East German comedian (1927–1981)

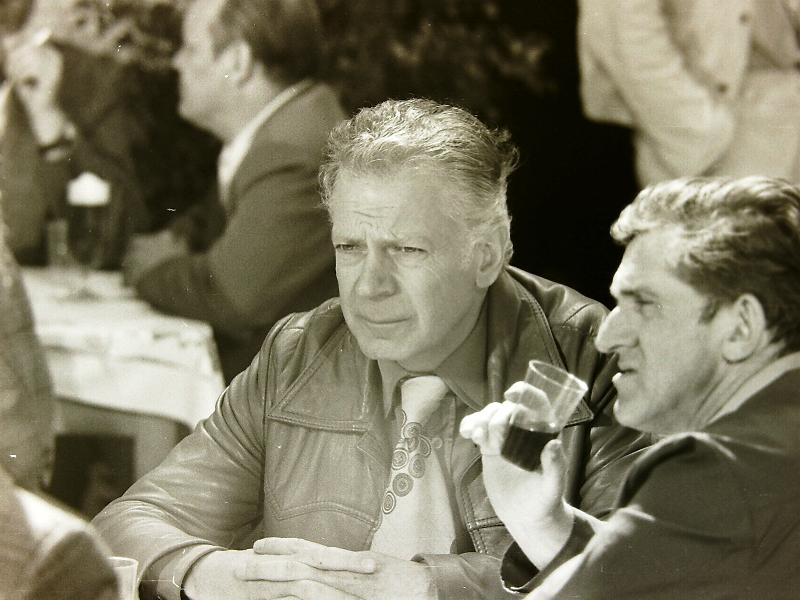
- Herricht in a tavern, 1977
- Born: Rolf Oskar Ewald Günter Herricht; October 5, 1927; Magdeburg, Germany
- Died: August 23, 1981 (aged 53); East Berlin, East Germany
- Occupations: comedian, actor
- Years active: 1946 - 1981
- Spouse: Christa Herricht (1937 - 2001)

Rolf Oskar Ewald Günter Herricht (October 5, 1927 – August 23, 1981) was an East German comedian.

== Biography ==
=== Early life ===
Herricht graduated from school in 1943 after passing a 'War Abitur', a form of an Abitur designated to free school pupils to be mobilized. In 1945, he was drafted to the Volkssturm and assigned as an anti-aircraft battery assistant.

After the end of World War II in Europe, he began working as a property master and a stage manager in a theater in his native Magdeburg, while studying acting in a local studio. After completion, he went to appear on the stages of theaters in Salzwedel, Stendal, Staßfurt, Güstrow and also in the Kleist Theater in Frankfurt am Oder.

=== Breakthrough ===
Herricht first met fellow actor Hans-Joachim Preil in 1951, while they both worked in Bernburg. The two formed the 'Herricht and Preil' comedy duo, staging their first sketch, 'The Chess Match', in 1953. In the sketch, Preil vainly attempts to play chess with Herricht, who is completely oblivious to the rules of the game. In their act, Herricht played the 'funny man', while Preil served as the 'straight man'. The pair were active until Herricht's death.

In 1957, Herricht returned to the Magdeburg Theater, where he remained until 1961. He mainly played comical characters, like the scribe in The Beaver Coat and the drunkard from Auerbach's Cellar in Faust I.

During his time in Magdeburg, he also worked in the radio. He and Preil first performed on television when one of their sketches was broadcast by Deutscher Fernsehfunk in 1959. The show was well received by the audience and the two began making regular appearances on TV. Herricht and Preil became the German Democratic Republic's most celebrated comedians.

=== Height of career ===
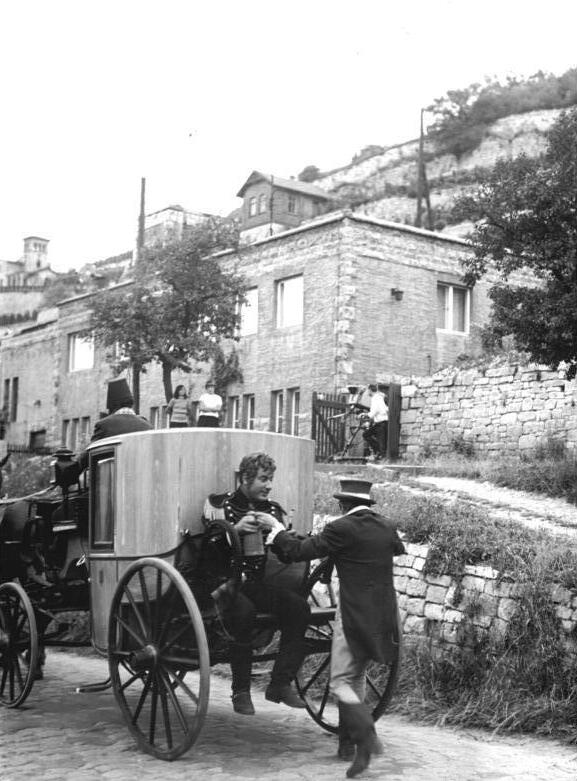
Herricht (back to camera) with Manfred Krug during the filming of Hauptmann Florian von der Mühle. 12 August 1967.

Herricht made his film debut in DEFA's 1959 comedy Before the Lightning Strikes, playing a minor part of a locomotive constructor. Herricht later appeared in some twenty cinema productions, while also playing in many television films. In 1964, he joined the regular cast of the Metropol Theater in East Berlin. He also had a career as a singer.

Herricht appeared on screen in relatively minor roles until writer Maurycy Janowski and director Gottfried Kolditz decided to create a film, the plot of which would be based on his comical skill, the 1964 Geliebte weiße Maus. Herricht portrayed a traffic policeman who falls in love with a woman and only dares speak to her when she makes an accident on the road. The picture was met with considerable success. Herricht starred in several other popular DEFA comedies during the 1960s and the 1970s: among others, he played the erratic National People's Army reserve soldier Ralf Horricht in the 1965 Der Reserveheld and the last-minute-travel-guide Hurtig in the 1967 Meine Freundin Sybille. His 1965 Hände hoch oder ich schieße, in which he again appeared as an eccentric policeman, was banned at the 11th plenary session of the Socialist Unity Party of Germany and only released in 2009, 28 years after his death.

Herricht was twice awarded the Art Prize of the German Democratic Republic: on 17 May 1973 and on 13 May 1977.

He died of a heart attack at the age of 53, while performing the role of one of the gangsters in Kiss Me, Kate on the stage of the Metropol. He is buried in Berlin's I Französischer Friedhof.

== Filmography ==
=== Cinema ===
- 1959: Bevor der Blitz einschlägt
- 1959: Musterknaben
- 1960: Seilergasse 8
- 1961: For Eyes Only
- 1962: Auf der Sonnenseite
- 1964: Geliebte weiße Maus
- 1965: Der Reserveheld
- 1965: Nichts als Sünde
- 1966/2009: Hände hoch oder ich schieße
- 1967: Meine Freundin Sybille
- 1968: Hauptmann Florian von der Mühle
- 1968: 12 Uhr mittags kommt der Boß
- 1969: Mit mir nicht, Madam!
- 1969: Der Weihnachtsmann heißt Willi
- 1969: Seine Hoheit – Genosse Prinz
- 1970: Husaren in Berlin
- 1971: Chyornye sukhari
- 1972: Der Mann, der nach der Oma kam
- 1972: Nicht schummeln, Liebling!
- 1977: DEFA Disko 77
- 1979: Der Baulöwe

=== Television ===
- 1959: Wie die Wilden
- 1960: Zweimal Madeleine
- 1961: Gastspiele im Dschungel
- 1961: Kater Lampe
- 1961: Bodo Baddy's bunte Bühne
- 1962: Was halten Sie von Musik?
- 1963: Komm mit mir nach Montevideo
- 1965: Muss das sein?
- 1966: Drei leichte Fälle
- 1969: Tolle Tage
- 1970: Der Schein trügt
- 1972: Der Mann seiner Frau
- 1973: Ein gewisser Katulla
- 1974: Schultze mit "tz"
- 1974: So eine Frau...
- 1974: Alle Haare wieder
- 1975: Mein lieber Kokoschinsky
- 1976: Keine Hochzeit ohne Ernst (Bunbury)
- 1976: Fürs ganze Leben
- 1976: Heute Ruhetag
- 1976: Frauen sind Männersache
- 1976: Maxe Baumann - Ferien ohne Ende
- 1977: Umwege ins Glück
- 1977: Der rasende Roland
- 1977: Ehe man Ehefrau bleibt
- 1977: Urlaub nach Prospekt
- 1977: Du und icke und Berlin
- 1977: Maxe Baumann - Keine Ferien für Max
- 1978: Ein Hahn im Korb
- 1978: Maxe Baumann - Max auf Reisen
- 1979: Maxe Baumann - Überraschung für Max
- 1980: Maxe Baumann - Max in Moritzhagen

== Singles ==
- Ausgerechnet Blechmusik
- Die Eiszeit Kommt Wieder
- Die Vielweiberei
- Gelber Mond
- Ich bin auf den Hund gekommen
- Ich bin ein Star des Fußballplatzgesangsvereins
- Ich soll stets die Leute nur zum Lachen bringen
- Immer dieser Ärger mit den Kleinen )
- Klamotten-Rag
- Laubenpiepergartenhundefest
- Mein grüner Papagei
- Oh, dieser Jazz
- Wenn Sie mich so anseh'n
