= Siegfried Weiß =

East German actor

Siegfried Weiss
- Born: Siegfried Weiss; 18 April 1906; Chemnitz, German Empire
- Died: 8 October 1989 (aged 83); East Berlin, East Germany
- Occupation: Actor
- Years active: 1924–1984

Siegfried Weiss (18 April 1906 – 8 October 1989) was an East German actor.

== Biography ==
Weiss made his artistic debut on the stage of the Halberstadt Theater, at 1924. He continued his career in the theaters of Lübeck, Königsberg, Magdeburg, Leipzig and Berlin, where he acted in the Berlin Ensemble, among others.

Weiss' film career started already in the Nazi era, with the 1937 Sherlock Holmes inspired movie Die Graue Dame (The Gray Lady), and had lasted for almost fifty years. After the Second World War he returned to acting on screen, working with the East German studio DEFA and with the television producers DFF. He appeared in more than fifty independent GDR productions and in co-productions with other Eastern Bloc countries, such as the epic movies Ernst Thaelmann, Karl Liebknecht and Liberation. He retired in 1984. Weiss retired at 1987, making his last appearance on stage in the Berlin Ensemble on 25 October that year.

== Partial filmography ==
- The Grey Lady (1937) - Ganove
- The Call of the Sea (1951)
- Die Unbesiegbaren (1953) - Kriminalbeamter
- Die Störenfriede (1953) - Erichs Vater
- Kein Hüsung (1954) - Graf Pfeil
- Alarm in Zirkus (1954) - Hepfield
- Ernst Thaelmann - Leader of his Class (1955) - industrialist
- Der Teufelskreis (1956) - Hanussen
- Zwischenfall in Benderath (1956) - Direktor Tappert
- Rivalen am Steuer (1957) - Alvarez
- Berlin – Ecke Schönhauser… (1957) - Fritz Erdmann
- Spielbank-Affäre (1957) - Balduin
- Gejagt bis zum Morgen (1957) - Eleganter Herr
- Sie kannten sich alle (1958) - Dr. Blei
- Der Prozeß wird vertagt (1958)
- Das Lied der Matrosen (1958)
- Erich Kubak (1959) - Egon Hempel
- Doctor Ahrendt's Decision (1960) - Kripphahn
- Der Traum des Hauptmann Loy (1961) - Colonel Nelson
- Henker - Der Tod hat ein Gesicht (1961) - Sekretär
- Das Stacheltier - Der Dieb von San Marengo (1963) - Syndikus der Hohlkörper AG
- Jetzt und in der Stunde meines Todes (1963) - Geschworener : Herr Meier
- Engel im Fegefeuer (1964) - Polizeioffizier
- Das Stacheltier - Das blaue Zimmer (1964) - (voice)
- The Story of a Murder (1965) - Dr. Rotholz
- Solange Leben in mir ist (1965) - Franz Mehring
- The Escape In The Silent (1966) - Juwelier
- Ohne Kampf kein Sieg (1966, TV Mini-Series)
- Ich - Axel Caesar Springer (1968, TV Series)
- Mohr und die Raben von London (1968) - Ender
- Der Mord, der nie verjährt (1968) - Prosecutor General
- Lebende Ware (1969) - Ferenc Chorin
- Meine Stunde Null (1970) - Oberst am Klavier
- KLK Calling PTZ - The Red Orchestra (1971) - Canaris
- Husaren in Berlin (1971) - Gotzkowsky
- Liberation III: Direction of the Main Blow (1971) - Manstein
- Trotz alledem! (1972)
- Das zweite Leben des Friedrich Wilhelm Georg Platow (1973) - Obersekretär Dollwitz
- Зарево над Драва (1974)
- Take Aim (1975) - Niels Bohr
- Komödianten-Emil (1980) - Meyer sen.
- Die Gerechten von Kummerow (1982) - Amtsrichter
- Romeo and Julia auf dem Dorfe (1984) - Richter
- Polizeiruf 110 (1984, TV Series) - Alois Hauber
