= Hartmut Reck =

German actor (1932–2001)

Hartmut Reck (17 November 1932 – 30 January 2001) was a German television and film actor. He also appeared in the American-produced epic film, The Longest Day. He also acted in the German film dubbing industry, dubbing into German the voices of Anthony Hopkins, John Hurt, Robert Duvall, Michael Caine, Donald Sutherland, Peter Graves, Patrick Stewart, Franco Nero, Terence Hill and others.

== Life and career ==
Reck was born in Berlin. He made his debut working in theater with the Berliner Ensemble, working under Bertolt Brecht. In 1956, he began working in film and with DEFA in the former German Democratic Republic. He moved to West Germany in 1959, where he played the title role in a television film, Raskolhikoff alongside Paul Verhoeven, Uwe Friedrichsen and Ernst Fritz Fürbringer. The film was based on the novel Crime and Punishment by Fyodor Dostoyevsky.

In 1962, he played in Jeder stirbt für sich allein, Falk Harnack's 1962 television film adaptation of the novel Every Man Dies Alone by Hans Fallada, appearing with Edith Schultze-Westrum, Alfred Schieske and Wolfgang Kieling.

Reck's best known feature film was The Longest Day (1962), an American war film about "D-Day", produced by Darryl F. Zanuck. The film's German and French cast members spoke their lines in their own languages, and in separately filmed sequences, spoke their parts in English. In 1965, he played alongside Karin Dor and Harald Leipnitz in a crime film by Edgar Wallace, The Sinister Monk. In 1968, he played Georges Picquart in a television film version of the Dreyfus Affair on German broadcaster ZDF.

Reck appeared in several guest roles on long-running German television series, Der Kommissar and Tatort. In 1988, he became well known to the German public as "Kommissar Ecki Schöller" in the television series Die Männer vom K3.

In addition to his film and television roles, Reck worked as a voice actor in the German film dubbing industry, dubbing the voices of numerous English-speaking actors into German, including Anthony Hopkins, John Hurt, Robert Duvall, Michael Caine, Donald Sutherland, Peter Graves, Patrick Stewart, Franco Nero, Terence Hill and others.

== Personal ==
Hartmut Reck was the father of one son (from a relationship with Vera Tschechowa) and two daughters. He died in Nienburg, Lower Saxony.

== Filmography (selected) ==
Film

- A Berlin Romance (1956) - Harald
- Zwischenfall in Benderath (1956) - Hans Hellmann
- Berlin, Schoenhauser Corner (1957) - FDJler
- Polonia-Express (1957) - 1. Arbeiter
- Sheriff Teddy (1957) - Robbi
- Tatort Berlin (1957) - Rudi Prange
- Ein Mädchen von 16 ½ (1958) - Rolf
- Tilman Riemenschneider (1958) - Gotthold
- Ware für Katalonien (1959) - Unterleutnant Schellenberg
- Musterknaben (1960) - Bassi
- Das Leben beginnt (1960) - Werner
- Der Schleier fiel (1960) - Robbi Freitag
- Heaven, Love and Twine (1960) - Friedrich Himmel
- Riviera Story (1961) - Roy Benter
- The Longest Day (1962) - Sgt. Bernhard Bergsdorf (uncredited)
- The Sinister Monk (1965) - Ronny

Television films and series

- Raskolnikoff (1959) - Raskolnikoff
- Der Prozeß Mary Dugan (1960) - Jimmy Dugan
- Die Dame ist nicht fürs Feuer (1960) - Humphrey Devize
- Der Groß-Cophta (1960) - The Knight
- Ruf zur Leidenschaft (1961) - Tony Burgess
- Spielsalon (1962) - Junger Mann
- Anfrage (1962) - Klaus Köhler
- Jeder stirbt für sich allein (1962) - Karl Hergesell
- Die Glocken von London (1962) - Richard Johnson
- Schlachtvieh (1963) - Engel, Journalist
- Mauern (1963) - Walter Koslowski
- Das Ende vom Lied (1963) - Unteroffizier Mitchem
- Tim Frazer (1964), (Francis Durbridge miniseries) - Lewis Richards
- Bericht von den Inseln (1964) - Reporter
- Die fünfte Kolonne: Zwei Pistolen (1964) - Klaus Bilek
- Das Duell (1964) - Lajewski
- Ein Sommer – ein Herbst (1964) - Dymow
- Keine Angst vor der Hölle? (1965) - Juge Maloine
- Ein Tag – Bericht aus einem deutschen Konzentrationslager 1939 (1965) - Ernst Springer
- Glück in Frankreich (1965) - Ernst
- Yerma (1965) - Victor
- An einem ganz gewöhnlichen Tag (1966) - Er
- Ein Mädchen von heute (1966)
- Die gelehrten Frauen (1966) - Clitandre
- Fliegender Sand (1967) - Henry Wellington
- Der Vater und sein Sohn (1968) - Vater Sedlmair
- König Richard II (1968) - Bolingbroke
- Affaire Dreyfuss (1968) - Major Picquart
- Alarm (1969) - Prosecutor
- Der Kommissar (1969–1972) - Lehrer Rossmann / Möricke
- Die Hupe – Eine Schülerzeitung (1969)
- Wir 13 sind 17 (1972)
- Doppelspiel in Paris (1972) - Roman Czerniawski
- Bauern, Bonzen und Bomben (1973), (miniseries based on Hans Fallada novel) - Redakteur Padberg
- Gemeinderätin Schumann (1974) - Kurt Schumann
- Partner gesucht (1976) - Wolf Brinkmann
- Im schönsten Bilsengrunde (1980) - Classen
- Der Aufsteiger (1981) - Eisenlauer
- Betti, die Tochter (1982) - Hans Wedemeier
- Wie es geschah (1983) - Harro Bergmann
- Lauter Glückspilze (1986)
- Quadrille (1986) - Axel Diensen
- Deadly Nightcap (1986) - Dr. Maurice Young
- Maria Stuart (1986) - Paulet
- Die Sterne schwindeln nicht (1986)
- Das Erbe der Guldenburgs (1987)
- Die Männer vom K3 (1988–2001, 38 episodes) - Ecki Schöller (final television appearance)
- Radiofieber (1989, TV miniseries) - Dr. Vock
- Der Fotograf oder Das Auge Gottes (1992)
- Nervenkrieg (1993) - Dr. Andre
- Cornelius hilft (1994)
- Mona M. – Mit den Waffen einer Frau (1996)

Voice acting (dubbing), selected

- Die Rechte und die Linke Hand des Teufels

(My Name Is Trinity, 1971)

- Vier Fäuste für ein Halleluja

(Trinity Is Still My Name, 1972)
