= Wolfgang Kohlhaase =

German film director and screenwriter (1931–2022)

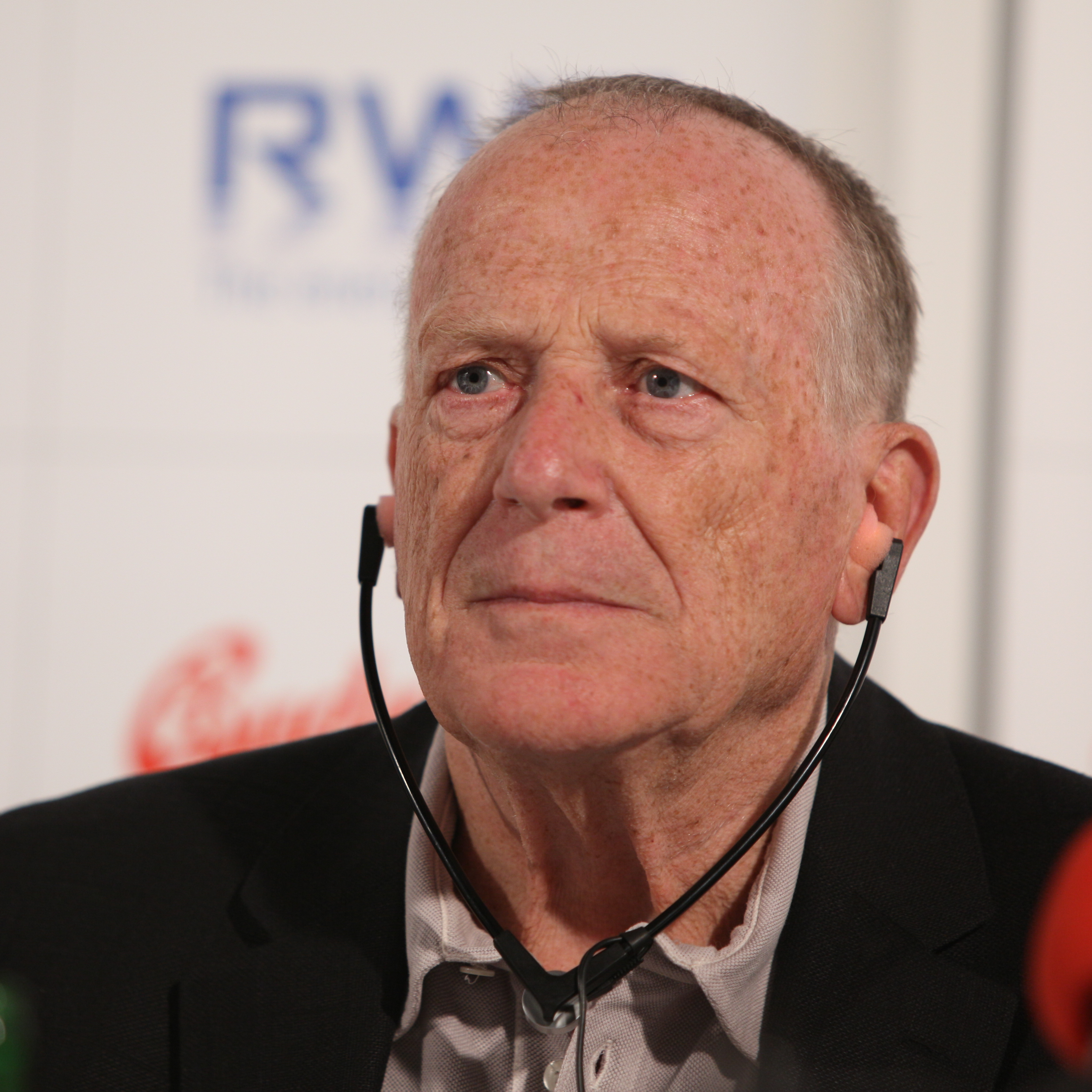
- Kohlhaase in 2009
- Born: 13 March 1931; Berlin, Brandenburg, Prussia, Germany
- Died: 5 October 2022 (aged 91)
- Occupations: Screenwriter, film director
- Years active: 1953–2022

Wolfgang Kohlhaase (13 March 1931 – 5 October 2022) was a German screenwriter, film director, and writer. He was considered "one of the most important screenwriters in German film history", and was one of the GDR's most well-known and prolific film screenwriters. Kohlhaase was awarded the Honorary Golden Bear at the 2010 Berlin International Film Festival.

== Early life ==
Kohlhaase was born to machine fitter Karl Kohlhaase and his wife Charlotte, and grew up in Berlin-Adlershof. He attended elementary and secondary school. He began writing while still at school and became a volunteer and editor at the youth magazine Start in 1947. He wrote short stories and portraits. A copy of Start with an article by Kohlhaase reached the Soviet prisoner-of-war camp where Kohlhaase's father was held since 1947. The father thus rose in prestige with the prison authorities; he received both more food and easier work and was able to survive the camp. The son later became a staff member of the Free German Youth (FDJ) magazine Junge Welt. From 1950 to 1952, he worked as a dramaturge assistant at the DEFA studios in Potsdam-Babelsberg.

== Career ==
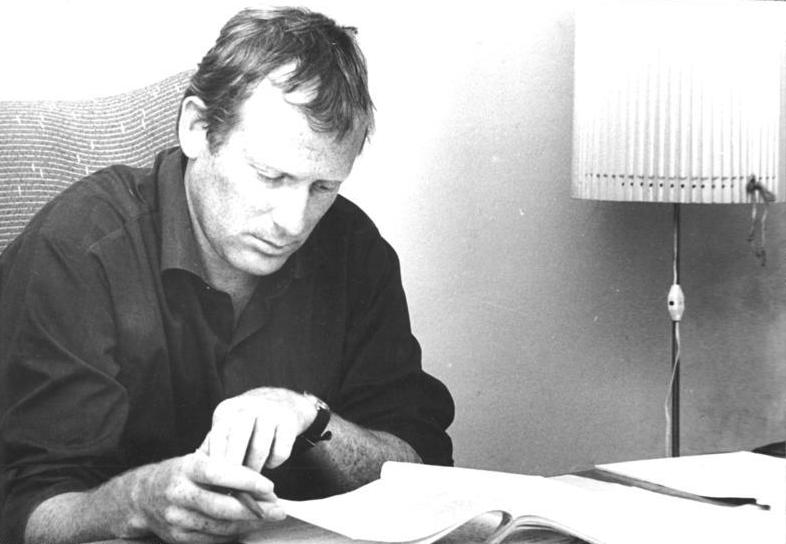
Kohlhaase in 1971

Kohlhaase had his first articles published while still attending school. Later on he worked as trainee writer for youth journals and as assistant dramaturge for DEFA before becoming a freelancer in 1952.

In collaboration with director Gerhard Klein he created the so-called 'Berlin Films', a popular genre about young East Berliners, inspired by Italian neorealism. Among these films are: Alarm im Zirkus (1954), Eine Berliner Romanze (1956) and Berlin – Ecke Schönhauser… (1957). Berlin, Schoenhauser Corner, a film set in Berlin and centred around the rebellious character of Ekkehard Schall, was criticised for negativity and conceding too much to neorealism. In 1961 he wrote for another Gerhard Klein film, The Gleiwitz Case (Der Fall Gleiwitz), which depicts the Gleiwitz incident on 31 August 1939, a false flag attack on a German radio station staged by the SS which was carried out to justify the Invasion of Poland. The plot was reconstructed exactly according to the statements of SS-Man Alfred Naujocks before British authorities at the Nuremberg trials. In 1963, Kohlhaase and Klein released Sonntagsfahrer (Sunday Driver), a story about six disgruntled citizens of Leipzig who flee East Germany for West Germany in 1961.

In 1968, Kohlhaase collaborated with director Konrad Wolf on I Was Nineteen (Ich war neunzehn ) which tells the story of a young German who fled the Nazis with his parents to Moscow and returns to Germany in 1945 as a lieutenant in the Red Army. Hermann Kant described the film as "the best film—in a short eternity—that has been made in Germany" at the Berlin Forum in May 1968, and it was also a major commercial success, selling 3,317,966 tickets in its initial run, making it the 41st highest grossing DEFA film.

In 1980, along with Konrad Wolf, he co-directed the film Solo Sunny. It was entered into the 30th Berlin International Film Festival, where Renate Krößner won the Silver Bear for Best Actress. In 1985, he was a member of the jury at the 35th Berlin International Film Festival.

== Writing style and achievements ==
Directors and film connoisseurs equated his "diverse wit" and his "precise observation of individual milieus" with the skills of Erich Kästner and Billy Wilder. Kohlhaase's screenplays deal with stories from everyday life and show his interest in a differentiated, realistic portrayal of the protagonists and their respective circumstances. What is appreciated about the style of his scripted dialogues is "a terse, laconic tone," a "dialogue wit" that seems "wise to life" and is "melancholic, sometimes even bitter." On the occasion of the award of the Honorary Golden Bear for his life's work at the Berlinale 2010, the jury praised Kohlhaase's "sense of authenticity in his characters as well as in his stories, his laconic, very economical language, and his fine irony." He gave courses on screenplay writing at various universities.

From 1970 Kohlhaase was a member of the PEN Center Germany, in 1972 he became a member of the Academy of Arts of the GDR, and in 1991 he was accepted into the Academy of Arts Berlin-Brandenburg. The Association of German Screenwriters (VDD) named him an honorary member at the 2011 Berlinale. On April 8, 2011, he received the Lola for lifetime achievement from the German Film Academy. In his acceptance speech, he said, "I'm not only delighted, but also encouraged. And you need that at any age."

== Personal life ==
Kohlhaase lived in Berlin and Reichenwalde, a village located 67 kilometres (42 mi) by road to the southeast of central Berlin. He was married to the dancer and choreographer Emöke Pöstenyi (de). One of his hobbies was boxing; for decades he boxed in the senior group at SG Narva.

== Filmography ==
=== Screenwriter ===
- 1953: Die Störenfriede – Director: Wolfgang Schleif
- 1954: Alarm in the Circus – Director: Gerhard Klein
- 1956: A Berlin Romance – Director: Gerhard Klein
- 1957: Berlin, Schoenhauser Corner – Director: Gerhard Klein
- 1959: The Silent Star – Director: Kurt Maetzig
- 1961: The Gleiwitz Case – Director: Gerhard Klein
- 1962: Josef und alle seine Brüder (TV film) – Director: Erwin Stranka
- 1963: Sunday Drivers – Director: Gerhard Klein
- 1965: Berlin um die Ecke – Director: Gerhard Klein (initially unfinished, first performance 1987)
- 1968: I Was Nineteen – Director: Konrad Wolf
- 1970: Fish For Four (TV film)
- 1973: Turek erzählt
- 1974: Der nackte Mann auf dem Sportplatz – Director: Konrad Wolf
- 1976: Mama, I'm Alive – Director: Konrad Wolf
- 1977: Ein Trompeter kommt – (TV, based on his radio play of the same name) Director: Edgar Kaufmann
- 1978: Der Übergang – Director: Orlando Lübbert
- 1980: Solo Sunny – Director: Konrad Wolf
- 1982: The Turning Point – Director: Frank Beyer
- 1984: Grünstein's Clever Move – Director: Bernhard Wicki
- 1985: Die Zeit die bleibt – Director: Lew Hohmann
- 1989: The Break – Director: Frank Beyer
- 1992: Begräbnis einer Gräfin (TV film)
- 1997: Der Hauptmann von Köpenick – Director: Frank Beyer
- 2000: The Legend of Rita – Director: Volker Schlöndorff
- 2002: Baby – Director: Philipp Stölzl
- 2005: Summer in Berlin – Director: Andreas Dresen
- 2009: Haus und Kind – Director: Andreas Kleinert
- 2009: Whiskey with Vodka – Director: Andreas Dresen
- 2011: I Phone You – Director: Tang Dan
- 2011: Nagel zum Sarg – Director: Philipp Döring
- 2015: As We Were Dreaming – Director: Andreas Dresen
- 2017: In Times of Fading Light – Director: Matti Geschonneck

=== Director ===
- 1979: Solo Sunny with Konrad Wolf
- 1992: Inge, April und Mai with Gabriele Denecke
- 1998: Victor Klemperer with Ullrich H. Kasten
