= Johannes Kepler (film) =

1974 East German historical drama film

- Directed by: Frank Vogel
- Written by: Manfred Freitag; Joachim Nestler; Frank Vogel
- Starring: Reimar Johannes Baur; Trude Bechmann; Kurt Böwe
- Cinematography: Otto Hanisch
- Edited by: Evelyn Carow
- Music by: Gerhard Rosenfeld
- Production company: DEFA
- Distributed by: Progress Film
- Release date: 15 November 1974
- Running time: 93 minutes
- Country: East Germany
- Language: German

Johannes Kepler is a 1974 East German historical drama film directed by Frank Vogel and starring Reimar Johannes Baur, Trude Bechmann and Kurt Böwe. It is a biopic of the German astronomer and mathematician Johannes Kepler.

== Cast ==
- Reimar Johannes Baur as Johannes Kepler
- Trude Bechmann as Katharina Kepler – Mutter
- Kurt Böwe as Tycho Brahe
- Karin Gregorek as Margarete Kepler – Schwester
- Katharina Thalbach as Ursula Haller
- Arno Wyzniewski as Vogt Aulber
- Martin Trettau as Pater Paul Guldin
- Günther Grabbert as Oswald Gabelkofer
- Dieter Franke as Pfarrer Binder
- Rolf Hoppe as Emperor Rudolf II.
- Manfred Zetzsche as Ernst von Köln
- Friedo Solter as Lucas Leyser
- Friedrich Richter as Michael Maestlin
- Käthe Reichel as Frau Haller
- Eva-Maria Hagen as Ursula Reinbold 'Reinboldin'
- Barbara Dittus as Stadtwächterfrau
- Günter Schubert as Stadtwächter
- Gerd Ehlers as Verteidiger Rueff
- Fred Delmare as Beutelsbacher
- Erik S. Klein as Vogt Einhorn
- Carl Heinz Choynski as Herr Schmidt
- Gert Gütschow as Kammerdiener Lange
- Hannjo Hasse as Oberkontrolleur
- Jörg Panknin as Stadtknecht
- Ernst Meincke as Jüngerer Stadtknecht
- Thomas Langhoff as Dr. Jessenius
- Hartmut Beer as Älterer Stadtknecht
- Sadegh Shabaviz as Katholischer Hauptmann
- Heinz Hupfer as Goldschmied
- Mary-Edith Schreiber as Frau des Goldschmieds
- Jan Bereska as Gerichtsknecht
- Jörg Knochée as Gerichtsschreiber
- Carmen-Maja Antoni as Gerichtsmagd
- Günter Junghans as Longomontanus
- Thomas Wolff as Tengnagel
- Hellena Büttner as Ulla – Tychos dänische Magd
- Karla Runkehl as Kristina Barbara Brahe – Tychos Frau
- Sybille Schmidt as Elisabeth Brahe – Tychos Tochter
- Werner Dissel as Richter
- Anja Steinert as Frau Schmidt
- Peter Hill as Schreiber von Gabelkofer
- Axel Werner as Wächter
- Gerd Funk as Jost Bürgi
- Michael Gerber as Unterkontrolleur
- Jan Spitzer as Ursinus
- Marietta Grünwald as Schöne Frau
- Kiril Popov as Reiteroberst
- Jörg Gillner as Junger Jesuit
- Wolfgang Greese as Andreas Schnabel

== Bibliography ==
- Mariana Ivanova. Cinema of Collaboration: DEFA Coproductions and International Exchange in Cold War Europe. Berghahn Books, 2019.
