= Wilhelm Koch-Hooge =

German actor (1916–2004)

- Born: 11 February 1916; Paczków, Upper Silesia, Germany
- Died: 2 September 2004 (aged 88); Berlin, Germany
- Occupation: Actor
- Years active: 1953-1989

Wilhelm Koch-Hooge (11 February 1916 – 2 September 2004) was a German actor. He appeared in more than ninety films from 1953 to 1989.

== Filmography ==
Year	Title	Role	Notes
1953	Geheimakten Solvay	Hannes Lorenz	
1953	Die Unbesiegbaren	Schröter	
1954	Gefährliche Fracht	Hein Jensen	
1954	Stärker als die Nacht	Hans Löning	
1954	Pole Poppenspäler	Herr Paulsen	
1955	Ernst Thälmann - Führer seiner Klasse	Hauptmann Schröder	
1956	Genesung	Max Kerster	
1956	Les Aventures de Till L'Espiègle	Le prince d'Orange	
1957	Rivalen am Steuer	Hermann Seering	
1957	Zwei Mütter	Dr. Waller	
1958	Rocník 21	Max	
1959	Special Mission	Petersen	
1959	Sie nannten ihn Amigo	Walter Meister	
1959	Reportage 57	Lowinsky	
1959	SAS 181 Does Not Reply		
1960	Leute mit Flügeln	Dr. Lampert	
1960	Schritt für Schritt	Ingenieur Brinkmann	
1960	Das Leben beginnt	Dr. Schenk	
1961	Five Days, Five Nights	Erich Braun	
1962	Zbabelec	nemecký porucík Schmolka	
1962	Mord ohne Sühne	Lawyer Dr. Koch	
1962	Pevnost na Rýne		
1965	Terra incognita	Dr. Rudolf Grebe	
1968	Der Mord, der nie verjährt	Lautenberg sen.	
1969	The Bridge	Oberst Mark von Felsen	
1970	Tödlicher Irrtum	Reynold	
1970	Sudba rezidenta	Klaus	
1971	KLK Calling PTZ – The Red Orchestra	General Münch	
1971	The Key	Friedrich	
1972	Lekce	Haase	
1972	Walter Defends Sarajevo	Oberstleutnant Hagen	
1972	Oáza	Major von Lüderitz	
1973	Kronika zhavého léta	Palme	
1973	Dny zrady	Keitel	
1973	Výstrely v Mariánských Lázních	Willi Habermann	
1975	Am Ende der Welt		
1975	The Day That Shook the World	Franz Conrad	
1975	Akce v Istanbulu	John C. Howard	
1977	Osvobození Prahy	Generál Rudolf Toussaint	
1977	Die Flucht	Meissner	
1978	Tichý American v Praze	Nemecky dustojník	
1981	Die Stunde der Töchter	Professor Scholbin	
1987	Tempi di Guerra	Oberleutnant	
