= Horst Giese =

East German actor

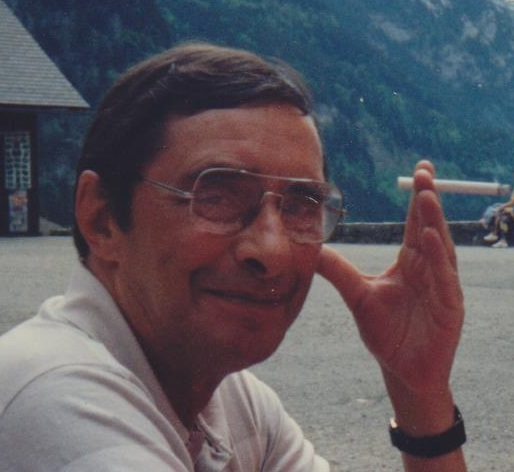
- Born: Horst Fritz Otto Giese; 31 January 1926; Neuruppin, German Reich
- Died: 29 December 2008 (aged 82); Potsdam, Federal Republic of Germany
- Occupation: Actor.
- Years active: 1945–1989

Horst Fritz Otto Giese (31 January 1926 – 29 December 2008) was an East German actor.

== Biography ==
In 1945, Giese made his debut on stage in his native Neuruppin, then in the Soviet occupation zone. Later he appeared on television. His first role in a movie was at the 1954 production Alarm in the Circus (Alarm in Zirkus). He performed in around 50 films and television productions, and is known for his portrayals of Joseph Goebbels in several films, including in the five-part series Liberation, film Soldiers of Freedom, the two-part Bulgarian production Anvil or Hammer and in the Czechoslovak comedy Tomorrow I'll Wake Up and Scald Myself with Tea.

Giese had a long correspondence with actor Klaus Kinski, who once visited him in East Berlin during 1956.

Shortly before the building of the Berlin Wall, Giese bought a West-German television device, and was arrested by the Stasi. To avoid punishment, he became an informant of the service. He was later accused of aiding the Stasi to arrest a man who helped residents of Berlin to flee to the west; the man was subsequently imprisoned for 26 months.

In 1972, after an accident forced him to a long vacation, he started to write the radio drama The Extremely Peculiar Jazz Adventures of Mr. Lehmann (Die sehr merkwürdigen Jazzabenteuer des Herrn Lehmann), in which he voiced 28 different characters. He recorded and edited the entire series in his Babelsberg home, finally completing it in 1979. Due to technical difficulties, the Jazz Adventures was only broadcast in 1991, after the fall of the Wall. Giese received a prize from Germany's War Blind Union. He later produce three other radio dramas: The Extremely Peculiar Film Adventures of Mr. Lehmann, The Case of Leonardo and If Goebbels Would Have Gone to Japan.

== Filmography ==
- 1954: Alarm in the Circus
- 1954: Stronger than the Night
- 1956: Thomas Müntzer - Bergknappe
- 1956: Those Days in Paris - Robert
- 1957: Duped Till Doomsday - Minor Role (uncredited)
- 1957: Rivals on the Steering Wheel
- 1959: Intrigue and Love - Rebell
- 1962: A Lively Christmas Eve - Giese
- 1963: Carbide and Sorrel
- 1964: Das Lied vom Trompeter - Arbeiter mit Binde
- 1968: The Banner of Krivoy Rog - Feldwebel
- 1970: The Case of Sergeant Grischa (TV Movie) - Schipper
- 1971: Rottenknechte (TV Mini-Series) - Müller
- 1971: KLK Calling PTZ - The Red Orchestra - Herr Schröder
- 1971: Liberation III: Direction of the Main Blow - Sapper Bruno Fermella / Joseph Goebbels
- 1972: Anvil or Hammer'' - Reichsminister Joseph Goebbels
- 1972: Laut und leise ist die Liebe
- 1972: Aus meiner Kindheit
- 1976: Das Licht auf dem Galgen - Schneider
- 1977: Soldiers of Freedom (TV Mini-Series) - Joseph Goebbels (uncredited)
- 1977: Tomorrow I'll Wake Up and Scald Myself with Tea - Joseph Goebbels
- 1978: Eine Handvoll Hoffnung
- 1978: Rotschlipse
- 1978: Fleur Lafontaine - Füsilier Müller
- 1980: The Archive of Death (TV Series) - Unteroffizier Mantei
- 1980: Der Baulöwe
- 1982: Front v tylu vraga - Joseph Goebbels
- 1983: The Turning Point - Deutscher Gefangener (uncredited)
- 1985: Half of Life
- 1985: Pobeda
- 1986: Wie die Alten sungen... - Straßenbahner
