= Sunday Drivers (film) =

- Film poster
- Directed by: Gerhard Klein
- Written by: Wolfgang Kohlhaase and Georg Edel
- Starring: Angelica Domröse, Hartmut Kirschke, Harald Halgardt, Herwart Grosse, Irene Korb, Erich Gerberding, Ellinor Vogel, Gerd Ehlers
- Cinematography: Helmut Bergmann
- Edited by: Evelyn Carow
- Music by: Wilhelm Neef
- Production company: DEFA
- Release date: August 30, 1963
- Running time: 87 minutes
- Country: East Germany
- Language: German

Sonntagsfahrer (Sunday Drivers) is a 1963 East German comedy-drama film directed by Gerhard Klein for the DEFA studio. The screenplay for the film was written by Wolfgang Kohlhaase and Georg Edel, and is about six disgruntled citizens of Leipzig who try to leave East Germany for West Berlin. It premiered on August 30, 1963, in Berlin.

== Plot ==
Six Leipzig citizens intend to leave the German Democratic Republic together for West Berlin on August 12, 1961. Mr. Spiessack, an interior designer leads the group, upon receiving information from a former lieutenant in the German Wehrmacht of an apparent impending war. Before leaving his apartment with his wife Friedchen trash the place and leave a message on the wall "We'll be back". They write a letter to the Socialist Unity Party of Germany. The doctor, Dr. Denker, whose wife is taking a cruise on the Mediterranean at the same time, is not sure that the timing is good. To his surprise, the X-ray equipment ordered long ago for his practice is delivered on that very day. The hypochondriac Mr. Teichert wants to go to the West, since his doctor is also already there and only he can treat him properly. Rosentreter, a hairdresser, has his 30-year-old Mercedes-Benz checked and refueled at the garage in preparation for the trip.

The journey does not last long, because the Mercedes' front axle breaks due to the bad roads, causing it to break down completely. Now a dispute arises in the group as to how they should continue. Soldiers from the National People's Army drive by and help push the Mercedes off the road. Through Sabine and Gernulf, the others learn about the nearby hotel. Here they leave some of their luggage behind and Mr. Spiessack telephones the car dealer. After drinking cognac given to them by the soldiers while waiting for cars to arrive, they eventually arrive at the train station in Königs-Wusterhausen due to the roads being closed by the soldiers. Dr. Denker decides not to go any further and wants to go back to Leipzig. While the remaining five people make their way to the platform, the announcement of the Ministry of the Interior of the GDR is pasted in front of the station, announcing the closing of the border to West Berlin. At the same time, it is announced over the station loudspeakers that the train will no longer pass through the West. While Dr. Denker is still at breakfast in the Mitropa restaurant, the five also return and together they head back to Leipzig.

The Spiessack family returns to their self-destructed apartment and find the police there with helpers. Mr. Spiessack had forgotten to turn off the hot water tap when he left. Mr. Rosentreter learns that his Mercedes has already been picked up and sold at the appraised price, which is a big financial loss. Dr. Denker irons his wife's clothes and looks forward to his work with the new X-ray machine. Sabine and Gernulf meet in a lecture at the university.

== Cast ==
- Harald Halgardt as Mr. Spiessack
- Herwart Grosse as Dr. Denker
- Irene Korb as Miriam
- Erich Gerberding as Teichert
- Ellinor Vogel as Friedchen
- Gerd Ehlers as Rosentreter
- Angelica Domröse as Sabine
- Hartmut Kirschke as Gernulf
- Erika Dunkelmann as the landlady
- Hans Finohr as controller
- Günter Naumann as VP constable
- Rita Hempel as farmer's wife
- Walter E. Fuß as master car mechanic
- Helmut Schreiber as professor
- Erich Mirek as VP constable
- Wolfgang Ostberg as peasant boy
- Kurt Böwe as Reichsbahner

== Release ==
Sonntagsfahrer was shot under the working title Kehr zurück nach vorn in black and white and had its premiere on August 30, 1963, at the Kino Babylon in Berlin. On television, the film was first broadcast on Ostdeutscher Rundfunk Brandenburg (ORB) on August 12, 1993. The film has also been released on DVD.

== Reception ==
Dr. Manfred Jelenski wrote in Berliner Zeitung: "Not a great or even earth-shattering work of art, but a film that is fun to watch". A review in Neue Zeit said "An intellectual film should be intelligent everywhere. This one is not always so. Which is very damaging to it".

The film website Filmdienst.de states that the film is "uncertain in its staging, vacillating between satire and deeper meaning, and ultimately implausible, derives some impact from its fine acting performances. It is mainly because of its historical explosiveness, as well as the recognizable tendentious attempts to deal with the building of the Wall in the film of the GDR, that make it interesting from today's perspective."
