= Alarm in the Circus =

1954 film

- Directed by: Gerhard Klein
- Written by: Wolfgang Kohlhaase; Hans Kubisch
- Produced by: Paul Ramacher
- Starring: Erwin Geschonneck
- Cinematography: Werner Bergmann
- Edited by: Ursula Kahlbaum
- Music by: Günter Klück
- Production company: DEFA
- Distributed by: Progress Film
- Release date: 27 August 1954
- Running time: 75 minutes
- Country: East Germany
- Language: German

Alarm in the Circus (German: Alarm im Zirkus) is a 1954 East German crime film directed by Gerhard Klein.

== Plot ==
Klaus and Max are two boys from West Berlin, whose families are too poor to pay for their higher education. They face a bleak future. Their only hobby is boxing, and they are both desperate to purchase real boxing gloves. The two meet Klott, a gangster who owns a bar that serves American soldiers. Klott offers to pay them if they assist him in stealing valuable horses from a circus in East Berlin. The two agree and travel to the Soviet zone, where they meet a girl named Helli, a member of the Free German Youth, who explains to them that in the communist east, the lack of money will not bar their way to education. The two realize the error of their ways, contact the People's Police and help the officers thwart Klott's plans and arrest the other thieves working for him. The two remain in East Berlin.

== Cast ==
- Erwin Geschonneck as Klott
- Uwe-Jens Pape as Jimmy
- Karl Kendzia as Batta
- Ulrich Thein as Herbert
- Hans Winter as Klaus
- Ernst-Georg Schwill as Max
- Gertrud Keller as Helli
- Annelise Matschulat as Mrs. Weigel
- Siegfried Weiß as Hepfield
- Peter Dornseif as Police officer
- Günther Haack as Catcher
- Horst Giese as uncredited role

== Production ==
Alarm in the Circus was the first of the so-called "Berlin films", a trilogy of pictures that were made in collaboration between director Gerhard Klein and writer Wolfgang Kohlhaase. These films were notable for their pioneering of neorealism in German cinema and for the manner in which they reflected the reality of the city in the years before the building of the Berlin Wall. They were also critical of the Americanization of its western side. Alarm in the Circus was followed by the sequels A Berlin Romance (1956) and Berlin - Schönhauser Corner (1957).

== Reception ==
Alarm in the Circus was viewed by 3.6 million people in 1954, becoming the highest-grossing East German film of the year, and sold 5,515,078 tickets in total. Klein and Kohlhaase both won the National Prize, 3rd degree, for their work on the film.

The Catholic Film Service defined the film as "exciting, well-made crime film that presents the background of a divided Berlin in a highly authentic manner." Peter C. Rollins and John E. O'Connor wrote that it had "drawn a clear contrast between the city's halves that fit the official communist paradigm."
