= Walter Kaufmann =

Walter Kaufmann may refer to:

- Walter Kaufmann (physicist) (1871–1947), German physicist
- Walter Kaufmann (composer) (1907–1984), composer, conductor, musicologist, and educator
- Walter Kaufmann (philosopher) (1921–1980), German-American philosopher, translator, and poet
- Walter Kaufmann (author) (1924–2021), German writer
