= Angela Brunner =

German actress (1931–2011)

Angela Brunner (12 January 1931 – 17 June 2011) was a German actress.

== Personal life ==
Brunner was married to German-Australian writer Walter Kaufmann. Their daughters are photographer Rebekka and actress Deborah Kaufmann. She was best known for Puppendoktor Pille for the DFF series Unser Sandmännchen.

== Selected filmography ==
- Ernst Thälmann - Führer seiner Klasse (1955)
- Junges Gemüse (1956)
- Naked among Wolves (1963)
- The Heathens of Kummerow (1967)
- Die Fahne von Kriwoj Rog (1967)
- Zille and Me (1983)
