= Sunday Driver =

Sunday Driver or Sunday Drivers may refer to:

- Sunday Driver (band), a UK band
- "Sunday Driver", a song by Her Space Holiday from The Astronauts Are Sleeping
- "Sunday Driver", a song by The Raconteurs from Help Us Stranger
- "Sunday Driver", a song by Transport
- "Sunday Driver", a song by Soobin from the K-pop Group, Tomorrow X Together
- "Sunday Driver", a song by True Widow
- Sunday Drivers (film) (Sonntagsfahrer), a 1963 East German film
- Sunday Drivers (Car Wars) – a 1982 supplement for Car Wars published by Steve Jackson Games
