= A Berlin Romance =

- Directed by: Gerhard Klein
- Written by: Wolfgang Kohlhaase
- Cinematography: Wolf Göthe
- Edited by: Ursula Kahlbaum
- Music by: Günter Klück
- Production company: DEFA
- Release date: May 1956
- Running time: 81 minutes
- Country: East Germany
- Language: German

A Berlin Romance (German: Eine Berliner Romanze) is a 1956 East German neo-realist romantic drama film about youth urban life in the divided city of Berlin, directed by Gerhard Klein. It was produced by the DEFA film company. It stars Annekathrin Bürger, Ulrich Thein and Uwe-Jens Pape. The script was written by Wolfgang Kohlhaase with a score composed by Günter Klück. The film was the second collaboration between Klein and Kohlhaase; the first was Alarm in the Circus (Alarm im Zirkus), released in 1954 and third came in 1957 with Berlin - Ecke Schönhauser. These films were noted for their strong criticism of consumer culture in Berlin after World War II and the Americanization of the capital and are amongst DEFA's best known films.

== Plot ==
The film is a love story about a seventeen-year-old East German apprentice shop assistant named Uschi (Bürger) and an unemployed auto mechanic named Hans (Thein) from West Berlin. She leaves her familial home and moves into West Berlin, drawn by the bright lights and economic progress on the western side. She initially dates handsome, stylish and well-earning Lord (Uwe-Jens Pape) who seeks to emulate American movie heartthrobs.

Then she meets Hans, an auto mechanic who, while also aspiring to be trendy, is living in relative poverty and is considered less physically attractive than Lord. Although initially mesmerized by the glamour of West Berlin and Lord, she falls in love with Hans, deciding that looks and image are not important. She eventually returns home to her parents along with Hans, who finds a job in the Eastern side of the city.

== Cast ==
- Annekathrin Bürger as Ushi
- Ulrich Thein as Hans
- Uwe-Jens Pape as Lord
- Erika Dunkelmann as Ushi's mother
- Marga Legal as Hans' mother
- Erich Franz as Ushi's father
- Horst Kube as Max
- Hartmut Reck as Harald
- Hermann Wagemann as shoe shiner
- Eckard Friedrichson as Moses
- Helga Wachaletz as Karin
- Paul Pfingst as teacher
- Karl Weber as construction entrepreneur
- Günter Großsteinbeck as Heini
- Karl Kendzia as worker of the Commerce Organization

== Production ==
Seeking to infuse the film with a strong sense of realism, Cinematographer Wolf Göthe used techniques such as wide-angle lenses, extensive location work and high-speed film.

=== Themes ===
The film, inspired by Italian neo-realism, is a poignant insight into the difference in socio-economic customs and general domestic life which divided the city of Berlin during this period. Through the protagonist, Uschi, the audience is able to understand the feelings and emotions felt by many at the time.

The film is a strong critique of the consumerist and image obsessions of the Berlin youth, influenced by American culture in the aftermath of World War II. Pictured are Uschi and Lord, with hairstyles and clothing evoking the Golden Age of Hollywood

The film is one of the strongest critiques of consumer culture in Germany in the 1950s in the aftermath of World War II.Alexander Stephan, in his book, Americanization and Anti-Americanism. The German Encounter with American Culture After 1945, argues that connection between bourgeois and individualism and the ethos of socialism became increasingly politicized after the Second World War. He claims consumerist fantasies between the west and the eastern sectors of Berlin increased as the city was being masculinized as a direct result of the American influence in the capital and the legacy of Hollywood film rebels, such as James Dean. He argues that the film, rather than being an advert for West Berlin, is in fact a critique of Americanization in the western side of the capital, and that American masculine influences weakened traditional senses of authority in both public and domestic life, and says, "In typical neo-realist fashion, Klein and Kohlhaase evoke the Americanization of East Berlin through their relationship [...]." The film, in this context, can therefore be seen as the struggle of young, working-class West German men in the city in a changing society with new pressures and influences brought about by the Americanization of the capital. Uschi's stern parents represent the traditional values which conflict with the emerging youth culture in the city. One of the most important pieces of consumer iconography in the film is the Kofferradio, a battery-powered portable radio, which Lord wears around his neck and which Uschi is very much impressed with. It is a metaphor for the economic and technological discrepancy which existed at the time between East and West Berlin.

== Reception ==
The film received a mixed reception upon release in May 1956. The film was criticized by the Ministry of Film in East Germany and was said to directly provide a negative instruction to young people in the east to move to the west where life is depicted as superior. Despite this, Klein and Kohlhaase collaborated again the following year with another realist film Schönhauser Corner (1957), which was a greater success at the box-office than A Berlin Romance. These two films are regarded as the most accurate insights into the East Berlin youth scene in the aftermath of World War II and were a considerable success amongst the public. The films have been described as "offering a more open engagement with American youth culture" and playing a "pivotal role in the rituals of protest shared by urban youth in East and West Berlin". The film was praised by newspapers such as BZ am Abend, Junge Welt and Berliner Zeitung for its accurate representation of urban culture in contemporary life in Berlin in the mid-fifties, showing people as they really were. However, some East German papers criticized the film for not providing an effective counter response to Uschi's notions that the East is bland and boring in comparison to the glamour of the west. Horst Knietzsch of Neus Deustchland believed that the "vital matters of the divided city" could have been dealt with much more effectively by Klein and Kohlhaase and by being more assertive in their depictions of the positive and negative aspects of the city at the time. He did offer some praise of Bürger's portrayal of Uschi, remarking that "She has a sweet, attractive face and a sexy figure (accentuated by tight dresses), but being an amateur, she is only convincing as long as she plays herself."
