= Erwin Geschonneck =

German actor (1906–2008)

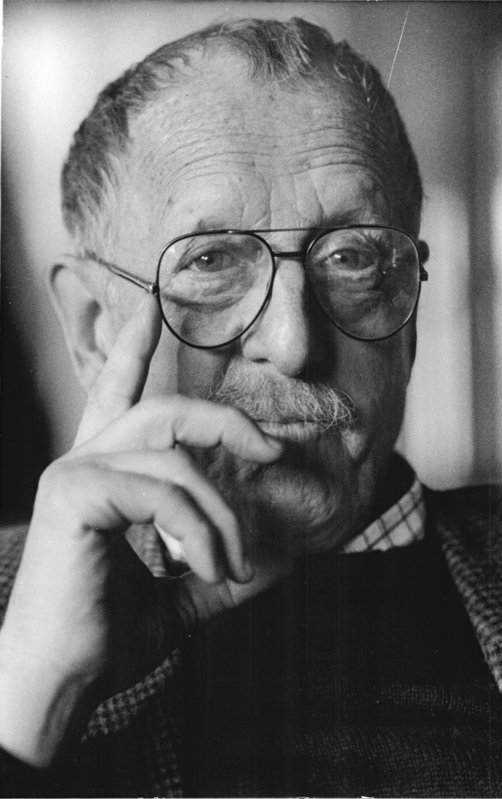
- Geschonneck in 1986
- Born: Erwin Geschonneck; 27 December 1906; Bartenstein, German Empire
- Died: 12 March 2008 (aged 101); Berlin, Germany
- Spouse: Heike Geschonneck
- Children: Matti Geschonneck, Alexander Geschonneck

Erwin Geschonneck (27 December 1906 – 12 March 2008) was a German actor. His biggest success occurred in the German Democratic Republic, where he was considered one of the most famous actors of the time.

== Early life ==
Geschonneck was born in Bartenstein, East Prussia (now Bartoszyce, Poland), the son of a poor shoemaker. The family moved to Berlin in 1909 so his father could work as a nightwatchman. In 1919, the younger Geschonneck joined the Communist Party of Germany. After the Nazi takeover in 1933, he emigrated to the Soviet Union via Poland, but was expelled in 1938 and moved to Prague. After the German occupation of Bohemia and Moravia, he was arrested on 31 March 1939. During World War II, he was imprisoned in several Nazi concentration camps. In 1945, Geschonneck was one of the few prisoners who survived the RAF sinking of the Cap Arcona.

== Career ==
Immediately following the war, Geschonneck acted in theaters in Hamburg, Germany, and made his film debut in 1947 in In jenen Tagen. He subsequently moved to East Germany, worked with Bertolt Brecht, and became a successful actor. He was a member of the jury at the 6th and 7th Moscow International Film Festivals.

Geschonneck was featured in the German film Jacob the Liar by Frank Beyer, which was nominated for Best Foreign Language Film at the 1977 Academy Awards – the only nomination for the GDR. In December 2006, he turned 100.

His last film, made in 1995 for the German television network ARD, was Matulla und Busch, where he played alongside veteran actor Fred Delmare. Geschonneck's son Matti Geschonneck directed.

== Death ==
Geschonneck died in Berlin on 12 March 2008, aged 101.

== Filmography ==
- Kuhle Wampe (1932) – Arbeitersportler (uncredited)
- In Those Days (1947) – Schmitt / 6. Geschichte
- Finale (1948) – Wilke
- The Last Night (1949) – Oskar, Fahrer
- Love '47 (1949) – Kriminalbeamter
- The Beaver Coat (1949) – Motes
- Harbour Melody (1950) – Emil
- Das Kalte Herz (1950) – Holländer-Michel
- Das Beil von Wandsbek (1951) – Albert Teetjen
- Schatten über den Inseln (1952) – Dr. Sten Horn
- Die Unbesiegbaren (1953) – Wilhelm Liebknecht
- Alarm im Zirkus (1954) – Klott
- Das Stacheltier: Das Haushaltswunder (1955) – Abteilungsleiter Vogel
- Das Stacheltier: Es geht um die Wurst (1955) – Leo Weiß, Friseur
- Mutter Courage und ihre Kinder (1955, unfinished film) – Feldprediger
- Les Aventures de Till L'Espiègle (1956) – Bras d'Acier
- Der Hauptmann von Köln (1956) – Hans Karjanke
- Schlösser und Katen (1957) – Bröker
- Katzgraben (1957) – Großmann, ein Großbauer
- Der Lotterieschwede (1958) – Johan Jönsson
- Geschichte vom armen Hassan (1958) – Machmud
- SAS 181 antwortet nicht (1959)
- Musterknaben (1960) – Arthur Wedel
- Leute mit Flügeln (1960) – Bartuscheck
- Five Cartridges (1960) – Kommissar Wittig
- Ach, du fröhliche (1962) – Walter Lörke
- Wind von vorn (1962) – Schorsch
- Naked Among Wolves (1963) – Walter Kraemer
- Carbide and Sorrel (1963) – Kalle
- Tiefe Furchen (1965) – Roter Schuster
- Berlin um die Ecke (1965) – Paul Krautmann
- Geschichten jener Nacht (1967) – Willi Lenz (segment "Der grosse und der kleine Willi")
- Die Fahne von Kriwoj Rog (1967) – Otto Brosowski Sr.
- Ein Lord am Alexanderplatz (1967) – Ewald Honig
- Wir kaufen eine Feuerwehr (1970) – Herr Clasen
- Sonnensucher (1972) – Jupp König
- Tüzolto Utca 25 (1973) – Szentiványi
- Der Untergang der Emma (1974) – Fährmann Kluge
- Jacob the Liar (1974) – Kowalski
- Looping (1975) – Bienes Vater
- Bankett für Achilles (1975) – Meister Achilles
- Das Licht auf dem Galgen (1976) – Bering
- Tambari (1977) – Luden Dassow
- Anton, der Zauberer (1978) – Vater Grubske
- Das Ding im Schloß (1979) – Prof. Bunzberger
- Circus maximus (1980) – Szakállas
- Levins Mühle (1980) – Johann
- Asta, mein Engelchen (1981) – Otto Gratzick / Hermann Gschwinder
- Der Mann von der Cap Arcona (1982) – Erwin Gregorek
- Wie die Alten sungen... (1986) – Walter Lörke
- Mensch, mein Papa...! (1988) – Erich Zarling

== Television ==
- Die Gewehre der Frau Carrar (1953) – Pedro
- Gewissen in Aufruhr (TV miniseries, 1961) – Oberst Joachim Ebershagen
- Der Andere neben dir (1963) – Prof. Marschner
- Asphalt-Story (1964) – Robby Assmann
- Die Ermittlung – Oratorium in 11 Gesängen (1966) – Zeuge 9
- Rendezvous mit Unbekannt (TV miniseries, 1969)
- Jeder stirbt für sich allein (TV miniseries, 1970) – Otto Quangel
- Das Geheimnis der Anden (TV miniseries, 1972) – Don Pineto / Prof. Binder
- Im Schlaraffenland (1975) – James Luis Türkheimer
- Ein altes Modell (1976) – Bruno Nakonz
- Ein Wigwam für die Störche (1976) – Opa Fritz
- Die Insel der Silberreiher (1976) – Oberst von Bülow
- Des kleinen Lokführers große Fahrt (1978) – Großvater
- Plantagenstraße 19 (1979) – Richard Matuschke
- Verlobung in Hullerbusch (1979) – Ernst / Walter Wagemühl
- Herbstzeit (1979) – Paul Wositschka
- Meschkas Enkel (1981) – Meschka
- Benno macht Geschichten (1982) – Oskar Schrader
- Das Graupenschloß (1982) – Waldemar
- Matulla und Busch (1995) – Matulla (final film role)
