= The Banner of Krivoi Rog =

1967 film

Die Fahne von Kriwoj Rog
- Directed by: Kurt Maetzig
- Written by: Hans-Albert Pederzani (screenplay)
- Produced by: Manfred Renger
- Starring: Erwin Geschonneck
- Narrated by: Helmut Schellhardt, Marga Legal
- Cinematography: Erich Gusko
- Edited by: Brigitte Krex
- Music by: Gerhard Rosenfeldl
- Distributed by: Progress Film
- Release date: 27 October 1967
- Running time: 108 minutes
- Country: East Germany
- Language: German

The Banner of Krivoi Rog (German: Die Fahne von Kriwoj Rog) is an East German film, directed by Kurt Maetzig. It was released in 1967.

== Plot ==
Communist miner Otto Brosowski writes to the miners of Krivoi Rog, informing them about the harsh working conditions he and his friends endure due to the capitalist owners of the copper mine, who demand increasingly harder work. In response, he receives a Red Banner from them. As the Nazis seize power, Otto and his family take great personal risks to hide the flag from the authorities. In 1945, as World War II nears its end, the town is occupied by the Americans, who also attempt to steal the Banner. In July 1945, as the Americans retreat and the Red Army takes over the area, the Brosowski family takes the flag and heads to meet the Soviets.

== Cast ==
- Erwin Geschonneck: Otto Brosowski Senior
- Marga Legal: Minna Brosowski
- Helmut Schellhardt: Otto Brosowski Junior
- Eva-Maria Hagen: Elfriede
- Manfred Krug: Jule Hammer
- Angela Brunner: Frau Bienert
- Rudolf Ulrich: Bienert
- Horst Kube: Bartel
- Horst Giese: Gestapo spy
- Walter Kaufmann: Lieutenant Stone
- Perry Friedman: American officer
- Fred Delmare: Communist driver

== Production ==
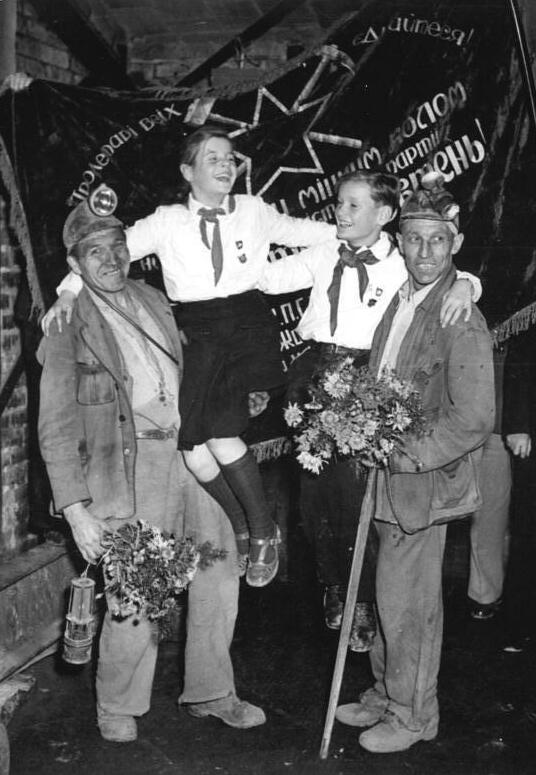
Miners and pioneers pose in front of the Banner of Krivoi Rog. 1952.

The script of The Banner of Krivoi Rog was adapted from Otto Gotsche's popular novel by the same name, which was entered into East German schools' curriculum. Gotsche's book was based on real events which took place in Gerbstedt before and during the Second World War: a man named Otto Brosowski had hidden a Red Banner he received from the miners in Krivoi Rog. The Banner itself was kept as a symbol of Soviet-German friendship. Maetzig's film was commissioned for the 50th anniversary of the October Revolution.

== Reception ==
The film was viewed by 2,772,000 people in the two months from its release until the end of 1967, with 750,000 of them in the first two weeks; that figure also included those who saw it in mandatory screenings in collective farms and schools. It became the second most watched East German film of the year, after Chingachgook, the Great Snake.

Maetzig, writer Hans-Albert Pederzani, actors Erwin Geschonneck and Marga Legal and cinematographer Erich Gusko were all awarded the National Prize, 1st degree, on 3 October 1968. The film also won the Cinema Award of the magazine Junge Welt.

Heiko R. Blum wrote that "the overly impassioned style, the hollow words... cannot destroy the picturesque quality of this impressive film, which is modeled after the classical Soviet epics." The German Film Lexicon defined The Banner of Kriwoy Rog as "an impressive, historically insightful picture that conveys its propaganda in a humane manner."
