= Johann Sebastian Bach (TV series) =

1985 East German miniseries

- Genre: Drama
- Written by: Lothar Bellag; Klaus Eidam
- Directed by: Lothar Bellag
- Starring: Ulrich Thein; Franziska Troegner
- Countries of origin: East Germany; Hungary
- Original language: German
- No. of series: 1
- No. of episodes: 4

Production
- Producer: Eva-Marie Martens
- Running time: 415 minutes
- Production company: DFF

Original release
- Network: DDR 1
- Release: 8 March – 17 March 1985

Johann Sebastian Bach is an East German miniseries which originally aired in four episodes on DDR 1 in 1985. It was produced to commemorate the three hundredth anniversary of the birth of the baroque composer Johann Sebastian Bach.

== Selected cast ==
- Ulrich Thein as Johann Sebastian Bach
- Angelika Waller as Maria Barbara Bach
- Franziska Troegner as Anna Magdalena Bach
- Rosemarie Bärhold as Liese
- Gunnar Helm as Carl Philipp Emanuel Bach
- Hans-Peter Minetti as Christian Friedrich Henrici
- Ralf Lehm as Johann Matthias Gesner
- András Kozák as Leopold, Prince of Anhalt-Köthen
- Yvetta Kornová as Catharina Dorothea Bach

== Bibliography ==
- Klossner, Michael. The Europe of 1500–1815 on Film and Television: A Worldwide Filmography of Over 2550 Works, 1895 Through 2000. McFarland & Company, 2002.
