= Arthur Pohl =

German film director and screenwriter (1900–1970)

- Born: 22 March 1900; Görlitz, German Empire
- Died: 15 June 1970 (aged 70); West Berlin, West Germany
- Occupation: Film actor
- Years active: 1931–1970

Arthur Pohl (22 March 1900 – 15 June 1970) was a German screenwriter and film director.

== Selected filmography ==
=== Director ===
- The Bridge (1949)
- Die Jungen vom Kranichsee (1950)
- Corinna Schmidt (1951)
- Die Unbesiegbaren (1953)
- Kein Hüsung (1954)
- Pole Poppenspäler (1954)
- Spielbank-Affäre (1957)
- Das Haus voller Gäste (1960, TV film)
- Kleine Geschäfte (1962, TV film)
- Randbezirk (1963, TV film)

=== Screenwriter ===
- Martha (1936)
- Twilight (1940)
- Street Acquaintances (1948)
