= A Lively Christmas Eve =

- Directed by: Günter Reisch
- Written by: Vratislav Blažek (original play), Hermann Kant
- Produced by: Hans Mahlich
- Starring: Erwin Geschonneck
- Narrated by: Gerry Wolff
- Cinematography: Horst E. Brandt
- Edited by: Lena Neumann
- Music by: Helmut Nier
- Production company: DEFA
- Distributed by: Progress Film
- Release date: October 12, 1962
- Running time: 94 minutes
- Country: East Germany
- Language: German

A Lively Christmas Eve (German: Ach, du fröhliche...; literally, Oh, You Merry One...) is an East German comedy Christmas film, directed by Günter Reisch. It was released in 1962.

== Plot ==
Dresden, Christmas Eve. Veteran communist and factory director Walter Lörke is told by his daughter Anne that she became pregnant by a young man named Thomas Ostermann, whom she intends to marry. Thomas is revealed to be a sharp critic of the government. Enraged, Walter leaves the house. Outside, he begins to inquire about his would-be son-in-law. After a clumsy voyage in the streets of the city, during which he encounters many absurd phenomena, he discovers that Thomas had a friend whose parents escaped to West Germany. The friend was ostracized by society, but Thomas did not shun him, and was therefore barred from entering university. Walter returns home and talks to Thomas, who realizes that although he suffered injustices, he remains true to the ideals of the party. The two reconcile.

== Cast ==
- Erwin Geschonneck - Walter Lörke
- Mathilde Danegger - grandmother
- Karin Schröder - Anne Lörke
- Arno Wyzniewski - Thomas Ostermann
- Günter Junghans - Karl Lörke
- Rosemarie Schelenz - Peggy
- Herwart Grosse - Mr. Ostermann
- Marianne Wünscher - Mrs. Klinkhöfer
- Walter Jupé - Mr. Klinkhöfer
- Karla Runkehl - Mr. Siebkorn
- Fred Delmare - taxi driver
- Gerd Ehlers - drunken butcher
- Walter E. Fuß - Professor Flimrich
- Horst Giese - Gisse

== Production ==
The film was part of a wave of comedies, relatively free from political restrictions, that were produced by DEFA at the early 1960s. At the time, the anti-Stalinist approach espoused by the Soviet Union allowed a more relaxed cultural climate, that came to an end in the 1965 XI Plenum of the Socialist Unity Party of Germany. The script was adapted from a Czechoslovak play; director Günter Reisch received the authorization to make the picture after using the influence of the leading actor Erwin Geschonneck on the members of the State Cinema Committee.

== Reception ==
The German Film Lexicon defined Ach, du Fröhliche... as a "better than average comedy, with barbed satire against dogmatic beliefs... with brilliant acting".

East German cinema expert Joshua Feinstein wrote that the film was one of the "more outlandish" made at the time, that reminded him of Guess Who's Coming to Dinner. He also noted that it was the only pre-1989 East German picture to make a satirical reference to the Stasi.

Joe Perry, who researched the Christmas costumes in Germany, considered Ach, du Fröhliche... as an example to the SED's attempt to uphold the holiday's traditions as a time of familial bonding while completely rejecting any religious connotation. A "Socialist miracle" of reconciliation between oneself and the leading ideology replaced the Christian-inspired one. The film presented the Christmas costumes of East Germany, that were a readjustment of the old tradition: the fir tree, for example, was decorated by little sputniks. Perry interpreted the film as a typical "happy end Christmas story" with a communist setting.

== See also ==
- List of Christmas films
