= Anna Susanna =

1953 film

- Directed by: Richard Nicolas
- Written by: Richard Nicolas
- Produced by: Adolf Hannemann
- Starring: Günther Simon
- Cinematography: Emil Schünemann, Wolf Göthe
- Edited by: Lieselotte Johl
- Music by: Horst Hanns Sieber
- Production company: DEFA
- Distributed by: Progress Film
- Release date: 27 February 1953
- Running time: 92 minutes
- Country: East Germany
- Language: German

Anna Susanna is an East German drama film directed by Richard Nicolas. It was released in 1953.

== Plot ==
During the Great Depression, a rich businessman named Brinkmann decides to sink his ship, Anna Susanna, in order to collect on the insurance. He orders its captain, Kleiers, to sabotage it while at sea. When Kleiers carries out his instructions, he is spotted by several sailors and passengers. The captain is killed in the ensuing fight, but not before he manages to shipwreck Anna Susanna. Only a handful of people survive. After they return home, they discover that Brinkmann's insurance fraud worked and he was compensated. They sue him at court and manage to have him indicted.

== Cast ==
- Günther Simon as Orje
- Peter Marx as Fietje
- Werner Peters as Kuddel
- Harry Hindemith as Emil
- Herbert Richter as Kleiers
- Alfred Maack as Peer Frensen
- Maly Delschaft as Kuddel's mother
- Aribert Grimmer as Kuddel's father
- Arno Paulsen as Jan Brödel
- Werner Pledath as Brinkmann
- Fritz Wagner as Uwe Frahm
- Hans Olaf Moser as Wesener
- Klaus Dirks as Lütt Heini
- Lothar Firmans as Van Diemen
- Jürgen Grundling as Jochen-Jürgen
- Friedrich Kühne as Kröger

== Production ==
During 1952, as the government control over DEFA tightened, the studio produced only six films, all of them influenced by the Cold War and dedicated to the ideological struggle between capitalism and socialism. Anna Susanna was one of those. Although the film had a plot suiting the government's policy, the DEFA Board was very reluctant to allow Richard Nicolas, for whom the picture was his debut as a director, to make Anna Susanna. Nicolas had threatened to resign if he would not be allowed to direct it, and was eventually granted permission. The film was also noted for being one of the first DEFA pictures to employ primitive special effects, such as building a miniature ship model that was wrecked in an aquarium.

== Reception ==
Heinz Kersten quoted an East German official who told that "the times in which pictures like Anna Susanna, that damaged the image of DEFA in the eyes of the people... should not return." The West German Catholic Film Service described it as "rather well-developed, thrilling crime film... but filled with typical criticism of the capitalist system."
