= The Story of a Murder =

1965 film

- Directed by: Joachim Hasler
- Written by: Angel Vagenshtain
- Based on: Die Jünger Jesu by Leonhard Frank
- Starring: Angelica Domröse
- Release date: 25 February 1965
- Running time: 87 minutes
- Country: East Germany
- Language: German

The Story of a Murder (German: Chronik eines Mordes) is an East German drama film directed by Joachim Hasler. It was released in 1965. The film takes inspiration from characters and narrative lines of Die Jünger Jesu, a novel by Leonhard Frank.

== Cast ==
- Angelica Domröse as Ruth Bodenheim
- Ulrich Thein as Dr. Martin
- Jirí Vrstála as Dr. Hoffmann
- Bohumil Smída as Dr. Schäure
- Siegfried Weiß as Dr. Rotholz
- Martin Flörchinger as Zwischenzahl
- Hans Klering as Direktor
- Willi Schwabe as Lion
- Antje Ruge as Esther
- Arno Wyzniewski as David
- Monika Lennartz as Johanna
- Stefan Lisewski as Steve
- Helmut Schreiber as Kapitän Liban
