= Friedrich-Wilhelm Junge =

German actor (1938–2025)

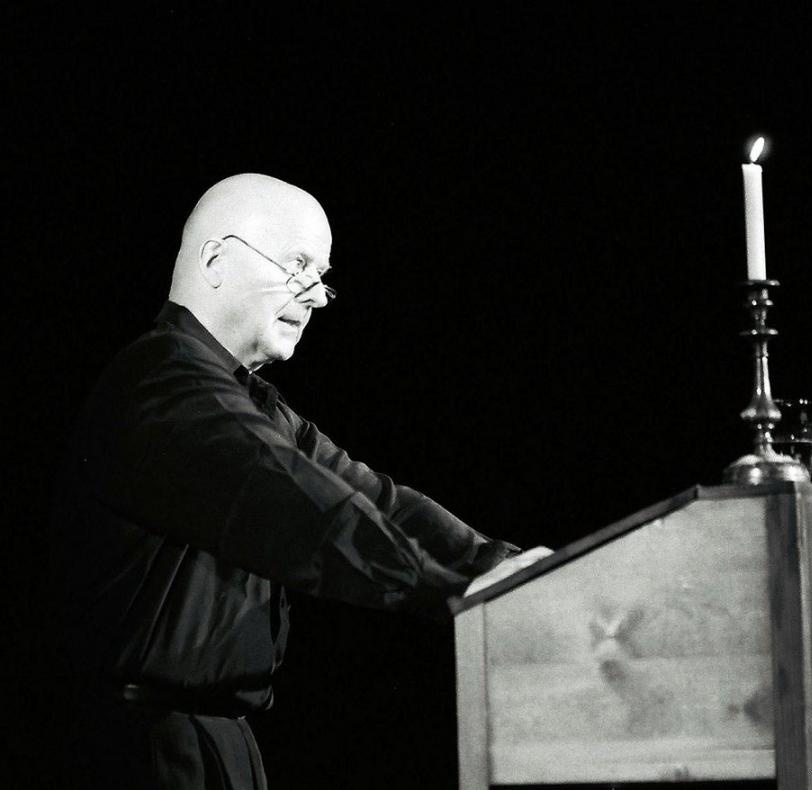
- Junge in 2007
- Born: Friedrich-Wilhelm Junge; 15 July 1938; Schwerin, Gau Mecklenburg, Germany
- Died: 20 February 2025 (aged 86); Dresden, Saxony, Germany
- Occupation: Actor
- Years active: 1957–2025

Friedrich-Wilhelm Junge (15 July 1938 – 20 February 2025) was a German actor. He was the founder of the Theater Dresdner Brettl (Theaterkahn Dresden).

Junge was born on 15 July 1938 in Schwerin, studying at the Hans Otto Theatre Academy in Leipzig from 1957 to 1960. He died on 20 February 2025, at the age of 86.

== Filmography ==
- 1959: SAS 181 Does Not Reply
- 1959: Love's Confusion
- 1962: People and Animals
- 1968: The Miser
- 1968: The Man Next to You
- 1969: The Devil
- 1971: Salut Germain
- 1972: The Great Journey of Agathe Schweigert
- 1974: Cities and Years
- 1978: Volpone
- 1979: Addio, piccola mia
- 1979: Büchner
- 1983: The Swapped Queen
- 1984: The Clever Farmer's Daughter
- 1994: Beckmann und Markowski (TV series, 1 episode)
- 1998: Tatort: Money! Money! (TV series)
- 1999: The Bride
- 2000: Ariadne auf Naxos
