= Renate Krößner =

German actress (1945–2020)

- Krößner, approximately 1979
- Born: 17 May 1945; Osterode am Harz, Lower Saxony, Germany
- Died: 25 May 2020 (aged 75); Mahlow, Brandenburg, Germany
- Occupation: Actress
- Years active: 1965–2019
- Awards: Silver Bear for Best Actress; Deutscher Filmpreis

Renate Krößner, also known as Renate Krössner (17 May 1945 – 25 May 2020), was a German actress who was internationally recognized for roles in films and television. She was awarded the Silver Bear for Best Actress of the Berlinale for the title role in the 1980 film Solo Sunny. From 1985, she worked in West Berlin and was known for roles in TV series such as Tatort and Einmal Bulle, immer Bulle.

== Early life and education ==
Krößner was born in Osterode am Harz, the daughter of a teacher. She grew up in Berlin and appeared in school theatre productions. She trained at the Staatliche Schauspielschule, earning her diploma at age 19, and then worked at several provincial theatres in the former East Germany.

== Career ==
Krößner first played small roles for TV productions from the mid-1960s, and appeared in her first film in 1965, Tiefe Furchen directed by Lutz Köhlert, and in a somewhat larger role ten years later in Ralf Kirsten's Eine Pyramide für mich. She made her national and international breakthrough as Tilli in Bis daß der Tod euch scheidet in 1979, directed by Heiner Carow, portraying a woman's best friend in a film about violence in a young marriage.

Krößner appeared in the title role of the DEFA film Solo Sunny in 1980, written by Wolfgang Kohlhaase and directed by Konrad Wolf, and remained identified with this role of a young woman from Prenzlauer Berg, a factory worker who dreams of artistic freedom as a singer, touring with a mediocre band, and in conflict with social conventions of the period. For her character role, she was awarded the Silver Bear for Best Actress at the 30th Berlin International Film Festival. It was the first Berlinale award for an East German production.

In 1985, Krößner and her husband, the actor Bernd Stegemann, moved to West Berlin where she played on stage, with guest performances. She played in North Curve (1993) and Alles auf Zucker! (2004). In television, she appeared in the series Tatort, Bruder Esel, Stubbe – Von Fall zu Fall and Einmal Bulle, immer Bulle. In 1993, she won a Deutscher Filmpreis Best Actress award for her work in North Curve.

In 1991, Krößner was a member of the jury at the 41st Berlin International Film Festival.

== Death ==
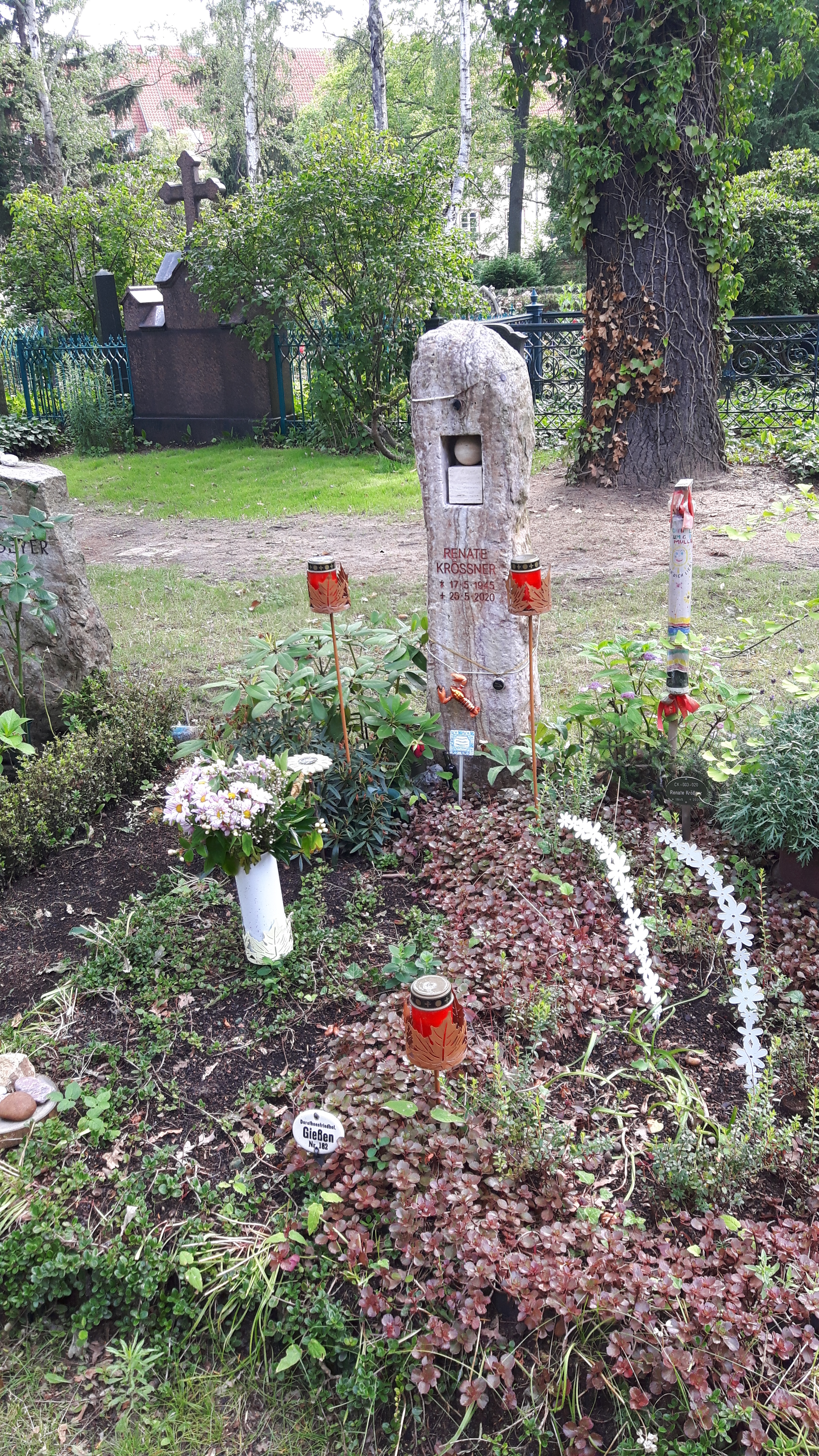
Her grave at Dorotheenstadt Cemetery in Berlin

On 25 May 2020, Krößner died after a short illness at the age of 75. On 17 May 2023, her 78th birthday, she was posthumously honoured by a Google Doodle.
