= Arno Wyzniewski =

East German actor (1938–1997)

- Born: 9 October 1938; Berlin, Germany
- Died: 14 September 1997 (aged 58); Berlin, Germany
- Occupation: Actor
- Years active: 1959-1997

Arno Wyzniewski (9 October 1938 - 14 September 1997) was an East German actor. He appeared in more than one hundred films from 1959 to 1997.

== Selected filmography ==
Year	Title	Role	Notes
1960	Five Cartridges		
1962	A Lively Christmas Eve		
1963	At A French Fireside		
1964	Viel Lärm um nichts		
1965	The Story of a Murder		
1965	The Adventures of Werner Holt		
1965	Denk bloß nicht, ich heule		
1972	Goya or the Hard Way to Enlightenment		
1973	Ripe Cherry		
1974	Johannes Kepler		
1986	Ernst Thälmann	Joseph Goebbels	
