= Friedrich Richter (actor) =

German actor (1894–1984)

- Born: 5 June 1894; Brünn, Austria Hungary
- Died: 3 March 1984 (aged 89); East Berlin, East Germany
- Occupation: Actor
- Years active: 1943-1984
- Spouse: Amy Frank

Friedrich Richter (born Friedrich Rosenthal; 5 June 1894 – 3 March 1984) was a German actor. He appeared in more than seventy films from 1943 to 1984.

== Selected filmography ==
Year	Title	Role	Notes
1943	Warn That Man		
1950	Hoegler's Mission		
1951	Der Untertan		
1959	Before the Lightning Strikes		
1961	The Gleiwitz Case		
1966	Der Frühling braucht Zeit		
1974	Johannes Kepler		
1975	Jacob the Liar		
