= Hannjo Hasse =

German actor (1921–1983)

- Born: 31 August 1921; Bonn, Weimar Republic
- Died: 5 February 1983 (aged 61); Falkensee, East Germany
- Occupation: Actor
- Years active: 1945–1983

Hannjo Hasse (31 August 1921 – 5 February 1983) was an East German actor. Over his nearly four decade career, he was best known for his roles in the films of Lebende Ware (1966) and Walter Defends Sarajevo (1972), as well as the television series Rote Bergsteiger (1968) and Archiv des Todes (1980).

== Biography ==
Hasse began studying acting in 1938 and attended Lily Ackermann's Institute for Stage Artists' Education in Berlin. At 1941, he was drafted in the Labour Service, and later in the Army. After the end of the Second World War and his release from captivity, Hasse returned to Weimar, where he spent another six months to complete his drama training.

He made his debut on stage at the Nordhausen Theater, where he was also employed as a dramaturgist. Later, he also worked in theaters in Eisleben, Burg bei Magdeburg and Schwerin, before settling in the Hans Otto Theater in Potsdam, in which he was a member of the regular cast between 1954 and 1962. Afterwards, he moved to Berlin's Volksbühne, and then to the Deutsches Theater. Hasse played a wide range of supporting characters, from Malvolio to the Fledermaus.

Hasse made his first appearance on screen already during 1951, playing a minor role in Der Untertan. From the late 1950s, he focused mainly on cinema and television work. Although his earlier stage roles were mostly comical in nature, he depicted sinister characters almost solely; Renate Seydel, who interviewed him in 1966, commented that he was the most perennial villain in the actors' cast of DEFA and Deutscher Fernsehfunk. He portrayed greedy pioneers who sought to dispossess Native Americans in many of East Germany's Red Western pictures. He is also remembered for depicting SD Colonel von Dietrich in the Yugoslav partisan film Walter Defends Sarajevo or a Gestapo officer in the Czechoslovak film Higher Principle. In addition to those entertainment films, he also portrayed historical antagonists in several bleaker pictures dealing with the recent past, like Alfred Naujocks in The Gleiwitz Case, Reinhard Heydrich in Sokolovo and Adolf Eichmann in 1966's Lebende Ware – based on the blood for goods affair. Hasse told Seydel that he considered those roles as having educational value, in order to "demonstrate the full horror of Fascism" to younger viewers.

Hasse was awarded the Art Prize of the German Democratic Republic on 7 May 1971. He is buried at Stahnsdorf South-Western Cemetery.

== Selected filmography ==
- 1951: Der Untertan – Mann (uncredited)
- 1954: Gefährliche Fracht – Sekretär von Harms
- 1954: Stärker als die Nacht
- 1954: Ernst Thälmann - Sohn seiner Klasse
- 1955: Ham wa nich!
- 1956: Die Millionen der Yvette – Herr
- 1956: Der Hauptmann von Köln
- 1957: Wo Du hin gehst – Adjutant
- 1958: Cerný prapor – Wolf
- 1959: Kapitäne bleiben an Bord – 2. Steuermann
- 1959: Sterne – Captain
- 1959: Bevor der Blitz einschlägt
- 1959: Weißes Blut – Dr. Kopf
- 1959: Kabale und Liebe
- 1960: Einer von uns – Catteau
- 1960: Seilergasse 8
- 1960: Leute mit Flügeln – SS-Offizier
- 1960: Vyšší princip – vrchní komisar Worlitzek
- 1961: Der Fall Gleiwitz – Alfred Naujocks
- 1961: Gewissen in Aufruhr (TV Mini-Series) – Oberst Rolf Steiner
- 1961: The Dress – Harry Riebauer (voice, uncredited)
- 1962: Freispruch mangels Beweises – Prosecutor Fuhrmann
- 1962: Polnocná omsa – Brecker
- 1962: An französischen Kaminen – Major Siebert
- 1963: Nebel – Mr. Edwards
- 1963: Reserviert für den Tod – Hauptmann Donath
- 1964: Preludio 11 – Barro (voice)
- 1964: Das Lied vom Trompeter – Pietzker
- 1966: Die Söhne der großen Bärin – Pitt
- 1966: Pharaoh – (german version, voice)
- 1966: Schwarze Panther – Leon
- 1966: Das Tal der sieben Monde – Sanitter
- 1967: Smrt za oponou – nemecký policista Hans Kreibe
- 1967: Die gefrorenen Blitze – SD Officer Zech
- 1967: Das Mädchen auf dem Brett – Klemm
- 1968: Spur des Falken – Bludgeon
- 1968: Mohr und die Raben von London – Mr. Cross
- 1968: Der Mord, der nie verjährt – Kapitänleutnant Pflugk-Hartung
- 1969: Lebende Ware – Adolf Eichmann
- 1969: Nebelnacht – Dr. Egbert Nikolai
- 1969: The Bridge – SS-Standartenführer Hoffmann
- 1970: Liberation I: The Fire Bulge – General Fieldmarshal Günther von Kluge
- 1970: Liberation II: Breakthrough – General Fieldmarshal Günther von Kluge
- 1970: Tödlicher Irrtum – Lee Garrett
- 1971: KLK Calling PTZ - The Red Orchestra – Ein Deutscher
- 1971: Liberation III: Direction of the Main Blow – General Fieldmarshal Günther von Kluge
- 1972: Valter brani Sarajevo – SS-Standartenführer Von Dietrich
- 1972: The Stolen Battle – von Seydlitz
- 1972: Nakovalnya ili chuk – Nebe
- 1973: Copernicus – Andreas Osiander – editor
- 1973: Die Hosen des Ritters von Bredow – Geheimer Rat von Lindenberg
- 1973: Unterm Birnbaum – Justizrat Vowinkel
- 1974: Das Geheimnis des Ödipus (TV Movie) – Oberfeldwebel
- 1974: Ulzana – Der Herr aus Washington
- 1974: Wie füttert man einen Esel – Vertreter Hasse
- 1974: Zum Beispiel Josef – Ausbilder in der Legion
- 1974: Johannes Kepler – Oberkontrolleur
- 1974: Kit & Co – Captain Consadine
- 1975: Front bez flangov – General von Horn
- 1975: Sokolovo – Reinhard Heydrich
- 1975: Atentat u Sarajevu
- 1975–1979: Das unsichtbare Visier (TV Series) – Van Straaten / Cliff
- 1976: Hostess – Fiatbesitzer
- 1976: Beethoven – Tage aus einem Leben – Fürst Karl Lichnowski
- 1977: Der kleine Zauberer und die große Fünf – Der Drachen (voice)
- 1977: Auftrag – Überleben (TV Movie) – Willi
- 1977: Wer reißt denn gleich vor’m Teufel aus – Hofmarschall
- 1978: Front za liniey fronta – General von Horn
- 1978: Fleur Lafontaine – Arzt
- 1979: Einfach Blumen aufs Dach – DHZ-Direktor
- 1980: Archiv des Todes (TV Series) – Major Zirrgiebel
- 1980: Die Schmuggler von Rajgrod – von Thunsdorff
- 1980: Der Baulöwe – Herr Paul
- 1980: Yunost Petra
- 1980: Levins Mühle – Rittmeister von Lojewski
- 1980: Svítalo celou noc – Mjr. Krombach
- 1981: Peters Jugend
- 1982: Front v tylu vraga – General von Horn
- 1983: Martin Luther
