= Romance with Amelie =

1982 film

- Directed by: Ulrich Thein
- Written by: Hartwig Strobel; Ulrich Thein; Benito Wogatzki
- Starring: Thomas Stecher; Brit Gülland
- Cinematography: Hartwig Strobel
- Edited by: Ilse Peters
- Release date: 1982
- Running time: 116 minutes
- Country: East Germany
- Language: German

Romance with Amelie (German: Romanze mit Amelie) is a 1982 East German drama film directed by Ulrich Thein. It was entered into the 32nd Berlin International Film Festival.

== Cast ==
- Thomas Stecher - Jürgen Siebusch
- Brit Gülland - Amélie
- Gudrun Ritter - Mutter Siebusch
- Fritz Marquardt - Schwoffke
- Wilfried Ortmann - Donath
- Brigitte Lindenberg - Unsefrau
- Heinz Hupfer - Unsemann
- Wolfgang Dehler - Michelmann
- Friederike Aust - Carla
- Karla Runkehl - Frau Hillner
- Kurt Veth - Konny
- Viktor Proskurin - Kriegsgefangener
- Grigore Grigoriu - Panzerkommandant
- Anatoli Rudakov - Ortskommandant
