= I Was Nineteen =

1968 East German film

- Directed by: Konrad Wolf
- Written by: Wolfgang Kohlhaase; Konrad Wolf
- Produced by: Herbert Ehler
- Starring: Jaecki Schwarz; Vasily Livanov; Alexey Eybozhenko; Dieter Mann
- Cinematography: Werner Bergmann
- Edited by: Evelyn Carow
- Release date: 1 February 1968
- Running time: 115 minutes
- Country: East Germany
- Languages: German; Russian
- Budget: 2,077,000 East German Mark

I Was Nineteen (German: Ich war neunzehn) is a 1968 East German film produced by Konrad Wolf for the DEFA studio.

The film tells the story of a young German, Gregor Hecker (Jaecki Schwarz), who fled the Nazis with his parents to Moscow and now, in early 1945, returns to Germany as a lieutenant in the Red Army. The film strives to maintain an aura of authenticity and pay homage to history by intersplicing fictional sequences with real documentary sequences and having references to popular/well-known music and literature at the time. The film depicts the personal experiences of the director Konrad Wolf and of his friend Vladimir Gall in fictionalized form and deals with themes of the meaning of "homeland".

During its original run, it sold 3,317,966 tickets.

== Cast ==
- Jaecki Schwarz as Gregor Hecker
- Vasily Livanov as Wadim Gejman
- Alexey Eybozhenko as Sascha Ziganjuk
- Galina Polskikh as Soviet girl
- Jenny Gröllmann as German girl
- Mikhail Gluzsky as Soviet general
- Anatoli Solovyov as Starschina
- Kalmursa Rachmanov as Dsingis
- Rolf Hoppe as Etappenmajor Behring
- Wolfgang Greese as Landscaper
- Johannes Wieke as colonel Lewerenz
- Jürgen Hentsch as First lieutenant Schenk, Adjutant
- Kurt Böwe as SS leader
- Klaus Manchen as blind soldier
- Walter Bechstein as 1st freed prisoner
- Hermann Beyer as 2nd freed prisoner
- Werner Wenzel as 3rd freed prisoner
- Dieter Mann as Willi Lommer
- Tscheslav Missejev as Adjutant
- Hermann Wagemann as printer
- Martin Trettau as prisoner in Oranienburg
- Achim Schmidtchen as naval officer

== Plot ==
On 16 April 1945, Gregor Hecker and his small squad follow in the wake of the 48th Army's westward advance from Brandenburg through the river Oder. This is the first time the young Soviet officer has returned to his homeland since he and his parents immigrated to Moscow when he was eight years old. He returns to his homeland as a stranger.

They arrive in Bernau, which is under occupation by Soviet armored personnel, where Hecker is quickly named commandant of the city. With the help of a handful of people, he tries to bring about order by establishing the authority of the Communist Party.

Hecker’s department finds living accommodations for the staff. They then come across a surprised German Army Inspectorate. The German Etappenmajor Behring wants to surrender to the Soviet forces properly, but his phone call to his superiors is believed to be a prank call.

In Sachsenhausen, Hecker and Sascha Ziganjuk (Alexey Eybozhenko) meet their leader, Wadim Gejman (Vasily Livanov). He is trying to save a German soldier from revenge of a Soviet soldier, who was just freed from a concentration camp. However, Gejman cannot save the German soldier from being shot, which he hears as they make their way back towards the camp. In the camp, Hecker and other Soviet officers are shown by a former prisoner the full extent of Nazi atrocities, through the examples of the gas chambers and Genickschussanlage.

On 30 April 1945, Gejman receives the order to negotiate the handover of the Spandau Citadel and takes Hecker along as an interpreter. Together, they go before the barricaded gate of the defended fortress. The fortress commander, Colonel Lewerenz (Johannes Wieke), and his adjutant (Jürgen Hentsch) climb down a rope ladder to them. While the other officers in the fortress debate the surrender, Lewerenz explains the German officers' code of honor. When Gejman is soon notified that the Fortress refuses to surrender, he asks to be taken to speak directly with the officers. Gejman and Hecker are allowed to climb together with the Germans into the fortress.

As Gejman tries to impress upon the German officers the hopelessness of their situation, another situation develops elsewhere within the fortress. An SS-Obersturmbannführer honors a Hitler Youth who destroyed a tank and shot one of its crew with a medal. The SS man is then prevented by the adjutant from shooting the parliamentarians and using the opportunity to flee.

On the 1st of May, after the success at Spandau, the good-humored driver Dsingis (Kalmursa Rachmanov) detours the slalom around wrecked trucks on the empty Autobahn. In one of the destroyed vans, Hecker meets a blind German Army soldier (Klaus Manchen), who mistakes him for a German. Despite the man's serious injury, he is hopeful about the future, not knowing that the Russians have already crossed the border.

That evening, a May Day celebration is held. A drunk Hecker falls from a ledge, and imagines hearing his mother's voice, berating him for doing everything too early, including smoking and drinking schnaps. Later, he watches an outburst of emotion from one of the liberated German communists, who loudly supports that all the Nazis should be hanged. The General placates him by saying that revenge is not the best advisor.

The next day, they head back to Spandau to support headquarters. On the way, Hecker and his companions bring along two of the communists. One is instated as mayor in an abandoned place. The other talks with Hecker until they go their separate ways at a checkpoint.

Everything is beginning to feel normal, however this feeling is deceptive. German troops break out of the Berlin basin and, disguised as Soviet units, try to go west. Hecker and his comrades barely escape a surprise attack.

They settle down near a small river crossing and use loudspeakers to try and convince German soldiers to stand down. It is unsuccessful at first, but Hecker soon manages to convince a few to surrender. Soon, they have a large number of prisoners.

Hecker finds a kindred spirit in Willi Lommer, a German non-commissioned officer from Berlin. When marauding SS troops attack the group of prisoners, Lommer takes up arms with the Soviets. Soon, the SS troops withdraw, but Ziganjuk has fallen. Hecker, full of anger and pain, shouts at the fleeing SS troops through the loudspeakers.

Before the German prisoners are transported away, Lommer hands Hecker a letter for his family. Hecker promises to deliver it.

== Background ==
Filming began in January 1967 with the support of the Soviet Army and the National People's Army. It had a budget of 2,077,000 East German Marks.

It alludes to Wolf's own experience as a political refugee who comes back as a 19-year old to Germany but in Red Army uniform.

Socialist Unity Party official Anton Ackermann forced Wolf to revise his screenplay because it depicted the Red Army as unprepared for the postwar occupation of Germany.

== Reception ==
=== Critical response ===
At the 2016 Telluride Film Festival, Volker Schlöndorff described the film's reception amongst young West German filmmakers as "considered... the best film to come from the East, despite the interference from DEFA."

Hermann Kant described the film in May 1968 in the Berlin Forum as "As far as I am concerned, this is the best film—in a short eternity—that has been made in Germany."

=== Accolades ===
Prize	Year Awarded
1968	Nationalpreis I. Klasse
1969	Heinrich-Greif-Preis 1. Klasse
1969	Best Youth Film (Youth Film Week Halle)
1975	Art Prize from the Society for German-Soviet Friendship
1995	Voted one of the 100 Most Significant German Films of All Time

== Bibliography ==
- Chiari, Bernhard; Rogg, Matthias; Schmidt, Wolfgang, eds. (2003). Krieg und Militär im Film des 20. Jahrhunderts [War and Military in 20th-Century Film] (in German). Munich: Oldenbourg Wissenschaftsverlag. ISBN 978-3-486-56716-8.
- Preuss, Evelyn. Wendy Everett (ed.). "To See or Not to See? Topographies of Repression in Konrad Wolf's I Was Nineteen (1968) and The Naked Man on the Sportsground (1974).". pp. 209-240.
