= Carbide and Sorrel =

Karbid und Sauerampfer
- Directed by: Frank Beyer
- Written by: Frank Beyer; Hans Oliva
- Produced by: Martin Sonnabend
- Starring: Erwin Geschonneck; Marita Böhme
- Cinematography: Günter Marczinkowsky
- Edited by: Hildegard Conrad
- Music by: Joachim Werzlau
- Production company: DEFA
- Release date: 27 December 1963
- Running time: 85 minutes
- Country: East Germany
- Language: German

Carbide and Sorrel (German: Karbid und Sauerampfer) is a 1963 East German comedy film directed by Frank Beyer and starring Erwin Geschonneck.

== Plot ==
In 1945, after the end of World War II in Europe, Karl 'Kalle' Blücher examines the ruins of the cigarette factory where he used to work in the city of Dresden. The other workers tell him they need carbide to replace the destroyed roof. They assign him the job of getting it, as he has a brother-in-law in Wittenberge who works at a carbide company. Also, they are all married and have to look after their families, while Karl is single and a vegetarian, so he should be better able to feed himself along the way.

Karl walks to Wittenberge. His brother-in-law gives him seven 50-kilogram (110 lb) barrels, but cannot help him with their transportation. His return to Dresden turns into a long chain of comical incidents.

First, a good-looking war widow named Karla invites him to put the barrels on her wagon and takes him a short distance to her farmhouse, where he spends the night and they become romantically entwined. He promises to return to her after he makes his delivery.

Next, he hitches a ride on a truck in exchange for his cigarettes. While waiting for another ride, he hunts mushrooms in the nearby forest, unaware that the woods are still mined until an old man warns him. A second truck takes him further along in return for his cooked mushrooms.

Finding a seemingly empty barn, he takes a nap in the loft. Soviet soldiers find him (and a hidden cache of Nazi food), so they take him to their commandant. The sympathetic commandant believes his story and lets him go, but tells him he needs permits from Dresden and Potsdam to transport raw materials between regions. Karl instead talks the captain in charge of supplies into giving him stamped written authorization and a cart for two barrels of carbide. Later, hunger overcoming his beliefs, he decides to go fishing using carbide (which explodes when it is wet). The first barrel he opens contains chalk, but the second has carbide. The explosion, however, results in suspicious Soviet troops taking him into custody again. Back he goes to the same commandant. This time, he trades the captain one more barrel for a 30-kilometre truck ride (Karl gives him the one with chalk inside). Along the way, they pick up first a middle-aged singer, then Karin, a teenage orphan in pigtails determined to go to America.

The trio then find an abandoned boat. The singer, unable to steal the boat, leaves the next morning. Karl rows the barrels and the girl (who does not want to go to Dresden) down the river Elbe. When one of the oars breaks, they end up stranded on the concrete pillar of a wrecked bridge in the middle of the river with two barrels; the boat comes loose and drifts away with the other two. Karin abandons him the next morning.

Then an American soldier appears in a motorboat. He is willing to help (in exchange for a barrel), but is forbidden to go into Soviet-controlled territory, so Karl steals his boat. He later docks and encounters Clara, a middle-aged widow. She plies him with liquor, but he ends up too drunk to go to bed with her as she wants. (One of her workers tells him that he is the 13th man Clara has taken in.) Two German ex-soldiers show up and are put to work gardening. Karl fixes some machinery in a sawmill. One of the soldiers sleeps with Clara. Early the next morning, the pair steal Karl's barrels, but he wakes up in time to drive them off.

He is next given a ride by an undertaker in exchange for a eulogy. Taking a nap in the empty coffin, he terrifies a hitchhiker when he emerges from it. At the funeral, they discover that the dead man was despised when the "mourners" slip quickly away.

At a black market, he tries to exchange transportation for a barrel, but is instead arrested. He escapes and is recaptured; fortunately, the man in charge believes he is working for the Soviet occupiers and lets him go.

Finally, after six weeks, he returns to the factory with two barrels of carbide. He finds letters from Karla there. Karl borrows a bicycle and starts back to Wittenberge.

== Cast ==
- Erwin Geschonneck as Karl 'Kalle' Blücher
- Marita Böhme as Karla
- Manja Behrens as Clara
- Margot Busse as Karin
- Kurt Rackelmann as Riese
- Rudolf Asmus as the singer
- Hans-Dieter Schlegel as the American soldier
- Fred Delmare as the coachman
- Bruno Carstens as the police officer
- Alexei Presnetsov as the Soviet commandant
- Leonid Svetloff as the Red Army supply officer
- Werner Möhring as Peter
- Peter Dommisch as Paul
- Fred Ludwig as Ganove
- Günter Rüger as the man with the marmalade
- Fritz Diez as the reconstruction chief
- Jochen Thomas as a locomotive driver
- Elsa Grube-Deister as a woman in the sawmill
- Gina Presgott as a woman in the sawmill
- Otto Saltzmann as an old man
- Wolfram Handel as a traveler
- Gerd Ehlers as the butcher
- Albert Zahn as a locomotive driver
- Hans Hardt-Hardtloff as the commissar
- Agnes Kraus as a woman in the cemetery
- Sabine Thalbach as a woman in the cemetery
- Else Koren as a woman in the cemetery
- Maria Besendahl as a woman in the cemetery
- Gertrud Brendler as a woman in the cemetery
- Frank Michelis as a worker
- Hermann Eckhardt as a worker
- Georg Helge as a worker
- Peter Kalisch as the man with the hat
- Horst Giese in an uncredited role

== Production ==
Frank Beyer recounted that the script was authorized without unusual problems. But after filming ended, representatives of the East German Ministry of Culture were worried that the portrayal of Red Army soldiers as comical plunderers would offend the Soviet Union. The Deputy Minister then took a copy of the film to Moscow and arranged a screening for a local audience. The audience broke into loud laughter during the viewing, and it was approved for mass screening.

Actor Erwin Geschonneck told that "In Carbide and Sorrel we did not ignore the hardships of the time. We did not turn the people who rebuilt the country into a joke... We knew that, in spite of all the challenges back then, the people also had funny experiences and knew to laugh about them."

== Reception ==
The film was well received. Author Joshua Feinstein noted that "the picture spared no one, including the Red Army, in its satire. The work also subtly undermined the official accounts of the GDR's history." Seán Allan and John Sandford wrote that "it took a deceptively light-hearted look at the division of Germany" and was a "milestone in DEFA's history." Catherine Fowler concluded that it was one of the "most prominent" examples of "DEFA comedies... relaxed enough to laugh at their own Germanness."

Frank Beyer's codename in Stasi files, Karbid, was inspired by the film's title.
