= Fish For Four =

1970 East German film

- Also known as: Fisch zu viert
- Screenplay by: Wolfgang Kohlhaase
- Directed by: Kurt Jung-Alsen
- Starring: Inge Keller; Marianne Wünscher; Helga Göring
- Music by: Helmut Nier
- Country of origin: East Germany
- Original language: German

Production
- Running time: 83 min.
- Production company: Deutscher Fernsehfunk

Original release
- Release: 21 June 1970

Fisch zu viert (Fish for Four), subtitled Ein Kriminalstück älterer Art (A Crime Play of an Older Kind), is a 1970 East German film made for television by Deutsche Fernsehfunk and directed by Kurt Jung-Alsen. It is based on the 1968 radio play of the same name by Wolfgang Kohlhaase and Rita Zimmer and stars Inge Keller, Marianne Wünscher and Helga Göring as three sisters of the Heckendorf brewery and Herbert Köfer as their servant, Rudolf. The first broadcast of this black-and-white film was on 21 June 1970.

== Plot ==
A Moritat singer gives an introduction to the story, which is said to have taken place in 1838 in a summer house near Neuruppin. He begins with the words: "Three sisters travelled on holiday, one saw the daisies blooming. Three sisters had a servant who served them many a year and yet remained a poor dog at the end of his days."

The servant Rudolf Mossdenger spends his time serving three sisters of the Heckendorf brewery. Sister Charlotte requests that they eat only healthy food such as fruit, vegetables and fish. The mention of fish upsets Rudolf, because he cannot tolerate fish. The rest of the first day passes with requests from the ladies, for which the servant is given a liqueur to drink as thanks, which he does not refuse.

After the sisters have gone to their rooms at night, Rudolf enters Clementine's without knocking. Although they have been on familiar terms until now, now that they are alone, they are suddenly on a first-name basis. Together they reminisce about the years gone by and spend the hour together. Rudolf states that he wants to quit due to his failing health in order to travel around the world for a long time on a ship. In return, he would like to be paid her promised share of her inheritance so that he can finance this trip. Clementine makes it clear to him that she cannot give him the money, as it is firmly invested in the brewery. Rudolf becomes disoriented and threatening, infuriating the sisters who try to poison him with arsenic.

== Cast ==
- Inge Keller: Charlotte Heckendorf
- Marianne Wünscher: Cäcilie Heckendorf
- Helga Göring: Clementine Heckendorf
- Herbert Köfer as Rudolf Mossdenger
- Walter Richter-Reinick as Moritat singer

== Reception ==
In the review of Neue Zeit, Mimosa Künzel wrote (translated from German): "According to a dramaturgically proven scheme, the plot was provided with an abundance of effective gags; a grateful field of activity for real comedians. And what was revealed to us - flashed back to 1838 - was full of bizarre ideas and quite suitable as a summer punchbowl. Kurt Jung-Alsen prepared the menu, which was easy to digest despite the arsenic. But as often before, he was not able to fully exploit the inspiring heights of artistic imagination."
