= Evelyn Carow =

German film editor (born 1931)

- Born: 17 December 1931 (age 94); Berlin, Germany
- Occupation: Film editor
- Notable work: Tatort Berlin (1958), I Was Nineteen (1968), Solo Sunny (1980)
- Spouse: Heiner Carow

Evelyn Carow (born 17 December 1931) is a German film editor. Working for state-owned production company DEFA, she was closely involved in the production of many films that are now considered classics of East German cinema.

== Selected filmography ==
- Berlin, Schoenhauser Corner (1957)
- Tatort Berlin (1958)
- The Gleiwitz Case (1961)
- I Was Nineteen (1968)
- The Legend of Paul and Paula (1973)
- Solo Sunny (1980)
