= Heaven, Love and Twine =

1960 film

- Directed by: Ulrich Erfurth
- Written by: Thomas Westa
- Based on: Heaven, Love and Twine by Thomas Westa
- Produced by: Joachim Sell; Franz Thierry
- Starring: Hartmut Reck; Ann Smyrner; Elke Sommer
- Cinematography: Albert Benitz
- Edited by: Ingrid Wacker
- Music by: Herbert Trantow
- Production company: Deutsche Film Hansa
- Distributed by: Deutsche Film Hansa
- Release date: 8 July 1960
- Running time: 88 minutes
- Country: West Germany
- Language: German

Heaven, Love and Twine (German: Himmel, Amor und Zwirn) is a 1960 West German comedy film directed by Ulrich Erfurth and starring Hartmut Reck, Ann Smyrner and Hannelore Schroth. It is based on the 1952 novel of the same title by Thomas Westa.

== Cast ==
- Hartmut Reck as Friedrich Himmel
- Ann Smyrner as Gerti
- Grit Boettcher as Susanne Himmel
- Hannelore Schroth as Madame Riffi
- Elke Sommer as Eva
- Ursula Grabley as Frau Kronberg
- Romana Rombach as Frau Haberstein
- Richard Münch as Major Knorr
- Heinrich Gretler as Feller Hansi
- Lutz Moik as Erich Hofmann
- Gisela von Collande as Frau Knorr
- Thomas Braut as Oberleutnant Allgeier
- Ursula Herwig as Frau Allgeier
- Albert Rueprecht as Leutnant Kosmehl
- Joost Siedhoff as Oberfeldwebel Schohmeier

== Bibliography ==
- Goble, Alan. The Complete Index to Literary Sources in Film. Walter de Gruyter, 1999.
