= Der Frühling braucht Zeit =

1966 film

- Directed by: Günter Stahnke
- Written by: Günter Stahnke; Hermann O. Lauterbach; Konrad Schwalbe
- Starring: Eberhard Mellies
- Release date: 1966
- Running time: 75 minutes
- Country: East Germany
- Language: German

Der Frühling braucht Zeit is an East German drama film directed by Günter Stahnke. It was released in 1966.

== Cast ==
- Eberhard Mellies as Heinz Solter
- Günther Simon as Erhard Faber
- Doris Abeßer as Inge Solter
- Karla Runkehl as Luise Faber
- Rolf Hoppe as Rudi Wiesen
- Hans Hardt-Hardtloff as Kuhlmey
- Erik S. Klein as Prosecutor Burger
- Friedrich Richter as Dr. Kranz
- Elfriede Née as Ruth Solter
- Agnes Kraus as Ursula Schmitz
- Heinz Scholz as Meermann
- Horst Schön as Schellhorn
- Kurt Barthel as Jensen
- Hans Flössel as Lehmann

== See also ==
- Film censorship in East Germany
