= Ulrich Thein =

German actor and filmmaker (1930–1995)

- Born: 7 April 1930; Brunswick, Germany
- Died: 21 June 1995 (aged 65); Berlin, Germany
- Occupations: Actor, film director, screenwriter
- Years active: 1953–1995
- Spouse: Jana Brejchová

Ulrich Thein (7 April 1930 – 21 June 1995) was a German actor, film director and screenwriter. He appeared in more than 40 films and television shows between 1953 and 1995. He won the award for Best Actor at the 11th Moscow International Film Festival in 1979 for his role in Anton the Magician. He directed the 1982 film Romance with Amelie, which was entered into the 32nd Berlin International Film Festival. His written legacy is in the archives of the Academy of Arts in Berlin.

== Selected filmography ==
- Alarm in the Circus (1954)
- Thomas Müntzer (1956)
- A Berlin Romance (1956)
- Schlösser und Katen (1957)
- The Sailor's Song (1958)
- SAS 181 antwortet nicht (1959)
- Professor Mamlock (1961)
- September Love (1961)
- Star-Crossed Lovers (1962)
- The Story of a Murder (1965)
- Anton the Magician (1978)
- Romance with Amelie (1982)
- Johann Sebastian Bach (1985, TV series)

== Bibliography ==
- Andy Räder: "Poesie des Alltäglichen. Ulrich Theins Regiearbeiten für das Fernsehen der DDR (1963‐1976)". Springer Nature, Wiesbaden 2019. ISBN 978-3-658-25239-7.
