= Peter Marx (actor) =

German actor (1914–1978)

- Born: 23 November 1914; Cologne, German Empire
- Died: 2 February 1978 (aged 63); East Berlin, East Germany
- Occupation: Actor
- Years active: 1946-1973 (film)

Peter Marx (1914–1978) was a German stage and film actor. He appeared in many films of the state-controlled studio DEFA in East Germany.

== Selected filmography ==
- Free Land (1946)
- Morituri (1948)
- The Orplid Mystery (1950)
- The Last Year (1951)
- Anna Susanna (1953)
- The Goodies (1959)
- For Eyes Only (1963)

== Bibliography ==
- Dieter Reimer. DEFA-Stars. Militzke Verlag, 2004.
