= Anton the Magician =

1978 film

- Directed by: Günter Reisch
- Written by: Karl-Georg Egel; Günter Reisch
- Starring: Ulrich Thein
- Cinematography: Günter Haubold
- Release date: 19 September 1978
- Running time: 106 minutes
- Country: East Germany
- Language: German

Anton the Magician (German: Anton der Zauberer) is a 1978 East German comedy film directed by Günter Reisch. It was entered into the 11th Moscow International Film Festival where Ulrich Thein won the award for Best Actor.

== Cast ==
- Ulrich Thein as Anton
- Anna Dymna as Liesel
- Erwin Geschonneck as Vater Grubske
- Barbara Dittus as Sabine
- Marina Krogull as Ilie
- Erik S. Klein as Schröder
- Marianne Wünscher as Rechtsanwältin
- Jessy Rameik as Bürgermeisterin
- Ralph Borgwardt as Leiter der Haftanstalt
- Gerry Wolff as Oberwachtmeister
- Werner Godemann as Franz Rostig
- Grigore Grigoriu as Sergeant (as Grigori Grigoriu)
- Dezsö Garas as Istvan
