= Franziska Troegner =

German actress (born 1954)

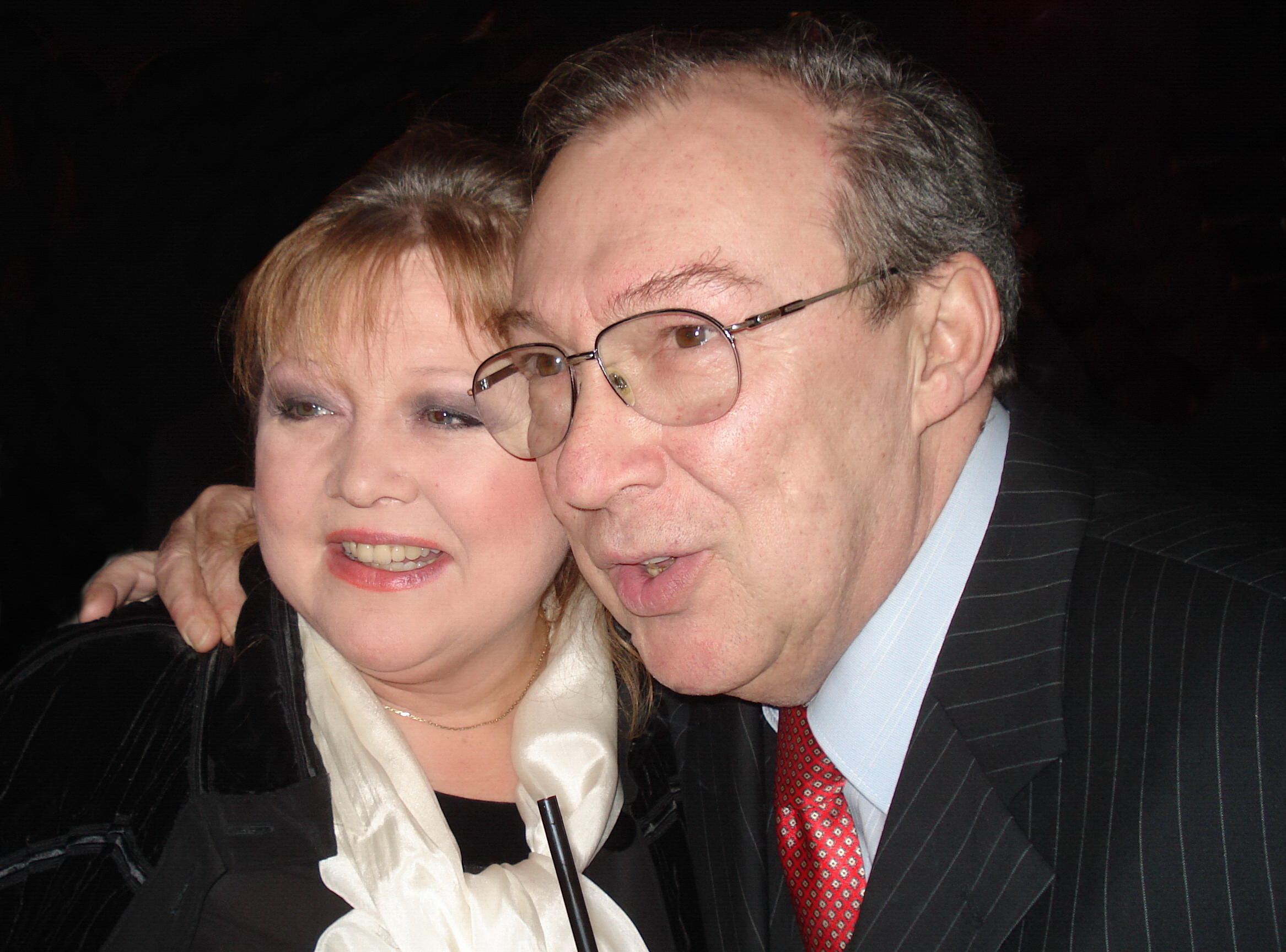
- Troegner and actor Jaecki Schwarz in 2009
- Born: 18 July 1954 (age 71); East Berlin, East Germany
- Occupation: Actress
- Years active: 1977–present

Franziska Troegner (born 18 July 1954) is a German actress.

== Early life ==
Troegner was born on 18 July 1954 in Berlin-Mitte, Germany.

== Career ==
Starting in 1976, Troegner was part of the theatre company Berliner Ensemble where she played in Brecht plays, e.g. Mother Courage and Her Children, The Threepenny Opera, The Caucasian Chalk Circle. Troegnerdubbed minor roles in several Miss Marple TV series, e.g. A Murder Is Announced, A Pocket Full of Rye.

Troegner played Mrs. Gloop in the 2005 film Charlie and the Chocolate Factory. Most of her other roles were in German TV movies and serials.

In 2009, Troegner published her autobiography Fürs Schubfach zu dick (Too fat to be typecast).

== Selected filmography ==
- Johann Sebastian Bach (1985, TV series)
