= Nur eine Frau =

1958 film

- Directed by: Carl Balhaus
- Release date: 1958
- Country: East Germany
- Language: German

Nur eine Frau ("Only One Woman") is an East German film. It was released in 1958. It is based on the life of the Leipzig campaigner for women's rights, Louise Otto-Peters, who is portrayed in the film by Karla Runkehl.
