= Solo Sunny =

1980 film

- Directed by: Konrad Wolf; Wolfgang Kohlhaase
- Written by: Wolfgang Kohlhaase; Dieter Wolf
- Starring: Renate Krößner; Alexander Lang; Dieter Montag; Heide Kipp; Klaus Brasch; Hansjürgen Hürrig
- Cinematography: Eberhard Geick
- Edited by: Evelyn Carow
- Music by: Günther Fischer
- Release date: 18 January 1980
- Running time: 100 minutes
- Country: East Germany
- Language: German

Solo Sunny is a 1980 East German drama film directed by Konrad Wolf and Wolfgang Kohlhaase. It was entered into the 30th Berlin International Film Festival, where Renate Krößner won the Silver Bear for Best Actress. Solo Sunny was the last completed film directed by Konrad Wolf.

== Plot ==
Ingrid "Sunny" Sommer is a singer for an East German band, called the Tornadoes, whose audience is usually senior citizens. For Sunny, performing as a solo pop singer is her dream but singing the same songs over and over to a small crowd has not gotten her there yet. When the saxophone player of the band is injured, the musician and philosopher Ralph steps in to substitute for him. Sunny falls for Ralph's saxophone skills, and soon they become lovers. Sunny asks Ralph to write her a song, and eventually he agrees. After walking off the stage before a performance, Sunny is soon replaced in the band by a new girl. Sunny turns to Ralph for comfort and finds him cheating on her. Finally Sunny has a chance to sing solo on stage with the song Ralph wrote for her, but she does not feel the love that she desires from the audience and gives up. After mixing sleeping pills and alcohol Sunny ends up in a hospital where she stays for rehabilitation. Once Sunny gets back on her feet she goes back to her old factory job, but she quits shortly after starting. The film ends with Sunny being accepted as a singer for another band with a sound different from the Tornadoes.

== Cast ==
- Renate Krößner as Sunny
- Alexander Lang as Ralph
- Dieter Montag as Harry
- Heide Kipp as Christine
- Klaus Brasch as Norbert
- Hansjürgen Hürrig as Hubert
- Harald Warmbrunn as Benno
- Olaf Mierau as Udo
- Ursula Braun as Frau Pfeiffer
- Regine Doreen as Monika
- Klaus Händel as Bernd
- Rolf Pfannenstein as Ernesto
- Bernd Stegemann as Detlev
- Fred Düren as Doktor
- Ulrich Anschütz as Grafiker

== Production ==
Wolfgang Kohlhaase, East Germany's most important screenwriter, wrote the screenplay for Solo Sunny and was made co-director of the film. The inspiration for this film was a German singer named Sanije Torka who was born of eastern European immigrant parents. Jutta Voigt, a German journalist who interviewed Torka and had connections to Kohlhaase, was a consultant for the film. The information used for the film drew on an interview Voigt had done with the singer in 1976 that was never published because her lifestyle did not fit East German socialist views.

== Reception ==
Although Solo Sunny was a film in which the East German socialist ideals were sometimes blatantly disregarded, it was not banned or censored by DEFA, the state-owned film studio. The film was based on a protagonist who was independent and who longed to succeed as a solo artist, which promoted individuality over the collective group. Audiences from East Germany and West Germany alike saw this and revered the character Sunny as a person that they felt exemplified who they wanted to be. In East Germany the showing of Solo Sunny resulted in sold-out seats with over a million viewers during the span of 19 weeks when it ran in the Kino International theater in East Berlin. Young people of the GDR even copied Sunny's fashion following the release of the film.

In 2026 Peter Bradshaw of The Guardian gave the film four stars out of five.

=== Awards ===
Within the year that the film was released it had won a total of 13 awards and one nomination from various film festivals. From the Berlin International Film Festival the film won the FIPRESCI Critics' Prize, the Reader Jury of the "Berliner Morgenpost", the Silver Bear and a nomination for the Golden Bear. Solo Sunny also won the Golden Plaque for Best Script from the Chicago International Film Festival. At the Eberswalde Film Festival it won many of categories including Competition, Best Director, Best Leading Actress, Best Supporting Actor, Best Supporting Actress, Best Cinematography, Best Film Score, Best Editing and Best Art Director.

== See also ==
- Film censorship in East Germany
- 30th Berlin International Film Festival
