= Ernst-Georg Schwill =

German actor (1939–2020)

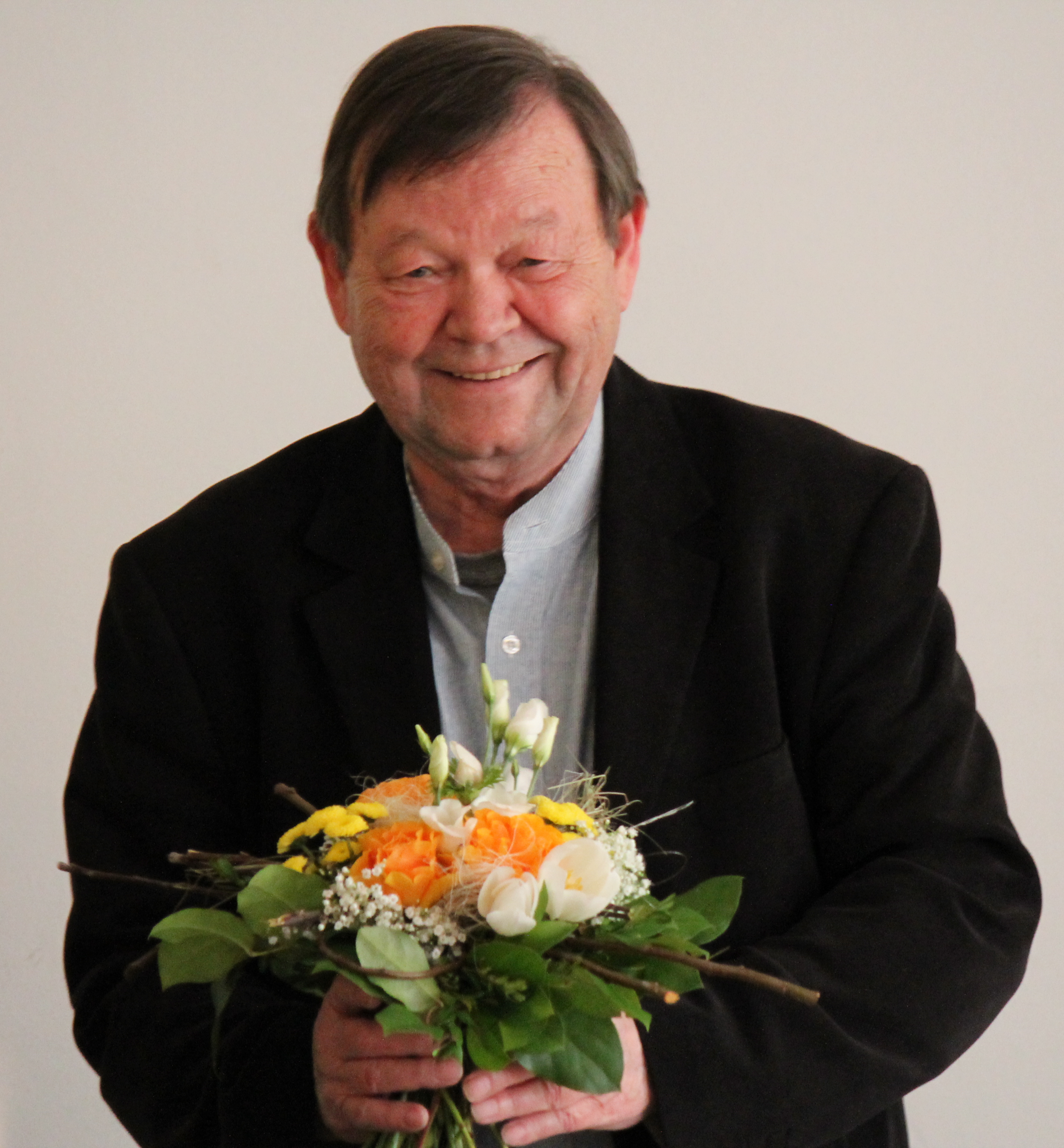
- Born: 30 March 1939; Berlin, Germany
- Died: 9 April 2020 (aged 81); Berlin, Germany
- Occupation: Actor
- Years active: 1954-2018

Ernst-Georg Schwill (30 March 1939 - 9 April 2020) was a German actor, best known for his performance as Kohle in the 1957 film Berlin, Schoenhauser Corner and as Lutz Weber in Tatort. For several years Schwill was an informant for the Stasi.

In addition to his artistic work, Schwill was also politically active. In the early 1960s, he became a candidate in the FDJ Central Council. From October 27, 1964 to May 22, 1973, Schwill worked as IM "Jacob" for the Ministry for State Security of the GDR. From 1983 to 1989, he worked again for the MfS as IM "Maxe."

== Selected filmography ==
Film
Year	Title	Role	Notes
1954	Alarm in the Circus	Max	
1957	Berlin, Schoenhauser Corner	Kohle	
1960	Five Cartridges	Willi Seifert	
1960	New Year's Eve Punch		
