= Die Jungen vom Kranichsee =

1950 film

- Directed by: Arthur Pohl
- Release date: 1950
- Running time: 100 minutes
- Country: East Germany
- Language: German

Die Jungen vom Kranichsee is an East German film. It was released in 1950.
