= Kein Hüsung =

1954 film

- Directed by: Arthur Pohl
- Written by: Ehm Welk
- Based on: Kein Hüsung by Fritz Reuter
- Release date: 1954
- Country: East Germany
- Language: German

Kein Hüsung is an East German film. It was released in 1954.
