= Geschichte vom armen Hassan =

1958 film

- Directed by: Gerhard Klein
- Release date: 1958
- Country: East Germany
- Language: German

Geschichte vom armen Hassan is an East German film. It was released in 1958.
