= Karla Runkehl =

East German actress (1930–1986)

- Born: 7 November 1930; Stettin, Pomerania, Germany
- Died: 24 December 1986 (aged 56); Kleinmachnow, East Germany
- Occupation: Actress
- Years active: 1950-1986

Karla Runkehl (7 November 1930 - 24 December 1986) was an East German actress. She appeared in more than forty films from 1950 to 1986.

== Selected filmography ==
Year	Title	Role	Notes
1952	Frauenschicksale		
1957	Castles and Cottages		
1958	Nur eine Frau	Louise Otto-Peters	
1959	The Punch Bowl		
1962	A Lively Christmas Eve		
1966	Der Frühling braucht Zeit		
1977	The Incorrigible Barbara		
1980	The Fiancee		
1982	Romance with Amelie		
