= Archiv des Todes =

East German war television film series

- Also known as: Archives of Death
- Country of origin: German Democratic Republic

Archiv des Todes (German: Archives of Death) is a 1980 13-part East German war television film series set during World War II.

== Cast ==
- Jürgen Zartmann: Georg
- Gojko Mitić: Boris
- Gerd Blahuschek: Ernst
- Leon Niemczyk: Janek
- Krzysztof Stroiński: Heiner
- Barbara Brylska: Hanka
- Renate Blume: Renate
- Alfred Struwe: Standartenführer Hauk
- Heidemarie Wenzel: Mrs. von Teschendorf
- Hannjo Hasse: Major Zirrgiebel
- Joachim Tomaschewsky: Beisel
- Helmut Schellhardt: Henselma

== See also ==
- List of German television series
