= Junges Gemüse =

1956 film

- Directed by: Günter Reisch
- Release date: 1956
- Running time: 79 minutes
- Country: East Germany
- Language: German

Junges Gemüse is an East German film. It was released in 1956.
