= Film censorship in East Germany =

Film censorship in East Germany was common at a politically sensitive time in history. Despite the three consecutive constitutions of the German Democratic Republic proclaiming freedom from censorship, in practice certain films were regulated. The chief reason for censorship in East Germany in cinema was criticism of government policies which the government perceived as a threat to the future of the nation. Censorship of film and other media was strictly de facto; the constitution of the GDR guaranteed freedom of the media and film. However, several forms of soft censorship were used to prevent the public from viewing certain films.

== Banned films ==
Films banned in the aftermath the 11th Plenum of the ZK-SED include:

- Spring Takes Its Times
- Trace of Stones
- Just Don't Think I'll Cry
- Born in 1945
- The Rabbit Is Me
- Karla
- The Lost Angel
- When You're Older, Adam
- Mademoiselle Butterfly
- Hands Up or I'll Shoot
- Berlin, Around the Corner

== FSK and Film Regulation ==
While censorship was, on the surface, officially banned by the GDR constitution, in practice, it was used extensively, particularly when it came to the censorship of American and Western films. During the immediate post WWII period, while the GDR was still working to establish legitimacy, direct censorship was not a viable option. The GDR worked hard to separate its own ideal from American and Western Ideals, which they viewed as a threat to the Communist ideals During the early years of the Republic, between the 1950s and 1970s the East German government employed what they called Freiwillige Selbstkontrolle der Filmwirtschaft, (FSK) which roughly translates to the Voluntary Self-Regulatory Body of the Film Industry. Though the name would suggest the organization was made up of volunteers, the actual members of the organization were appointed by the GDR government. Many of these members worked in the film industry prior to the split of East and West Germany. These members were tasked with screening each film before it was released to the public. This organization censored numerous American and Western films claiming them to be unfit for public viewing. Although approval of the FSK was not supposed to be explicitly required, many theaters in the GDR refused to show films that were not on the FSK approved list. The inner workings of the FSK were kept mostly secret from German citizens. The GDR's government did not want the average citizen to know they were being censored, in an effort to distance itself from its recent fascist past.

== Film Production In Germany ==
Germans in the pre WWII period were avid cinema goers. Over a billion cinema tickets were sold in 1943 alone in Germany. After Germany’s surrender during the second world war, German citizens continued to flock to cinemas in large numbers; cinemas reopened even before Germany officially surrendered. Before the official split of East and West Germany, Allied films were shown. As the rift between East and West became deeper and deeper, fewer Allied films were shown and were replaced with Soviet films. German citizens became well acquainted with Soviet accomplishments and the pitfalls of fascism. As the Soviets began to withdraw, the East German Government re-vamped an old Nazi era film production company. They centralized all the former Germany film production companies in and around Berlin into one monopolized film company, DEFA. This company held a monopoly on every stage of film production in the GDR and was responsible for all film production released to the public.
