= The Gleiwitz Case =

1961 film

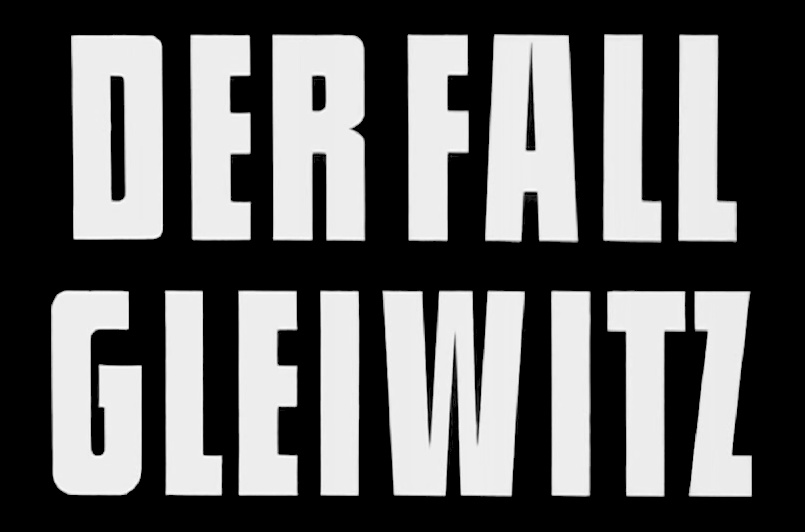
- Directed by: Gerhard Klein
- Written by: Wolfgang Kohlhaase; Günther Rücker
- Starring: Hannjo Hasse
- Release date: 22 April 1961
- Running time: 70 minutes
- Country: East Germany
- Language: German

The Gleiwitz Case (German: Der Fall Gleiwitz) is an East German war film directed by Gerhard Klein. It was released in 1961. The plot was reconstructed exactly according to the statements of SS-Man Alfred Naujocks before British authorities at the Nuremberg trials.

== Plot ==
The film depicts the Gleiwitz incident from 31 August 1939, a false flag attack on a German radio station staged by the SS. The fake attack was carried out to justify the Invasion of Poland as a defensive attack before the international community.

== Cast ==
- Hannjo Hasse as Alfred Helmut Naujocks
- Christoph Bayertt as Franz Sitte
- Wolfgang Kalweit as Hans-Wilhelm Kraweit
- Georg Leopold as Franz Wyczorek
- Herwart Grosse as Heinrich Müller
- Rolf Ripperger as Bieratzki
- Manfred Günther as Kühnel
- Rudolf Woschiek as Tutzauer
- Hilmar Thate as Sachsenhausen inmate
- Rolf Ludwig as SS doctor
- Friedrich Richter as Jewish professor
- Günter Naumann as SS man
- Paul-Dolf Neis as SD chief in Gleiwitz
- Werner Dissel as teacher
