= Kurt Böwe =

20th century German film actor

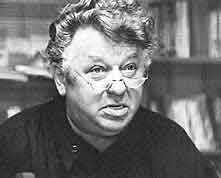
- Born: 28 April 1929; Reetz, Germany
- Died: 14 June 2000 (aged 71); Berlin, Germany
- Occupation: Actor
- Years active: 1962-2000

Kurt Böwe (28 April 1929 – 14 June 2000) was a German actor. He appeared in more than ninety films from 1962 to 2000.

== Selected filmography ==
Year	Title	Role	Notes
1968	I Was Nineteen		
1974	Johannes Kepler		
1975	Between Day and Night	Erich Weinert	
1980	Jadup and Boel	Jadup	
1982	Märkische Forschungen		
1992	Silent Country		
