= The Goodies (film) =

1959 film

Musterknaben
- Directed by: Johannes Knittel
- Written by: Gerhard Bengsch
- Produced by: Alexander Lösche
- Starring: Hartmut Reck
- Cinematography: Ernst W. Fiedler
- Edited by: Wally Gurschke
- Music by: Günter Hörig
- Distributed by: Progress Film
- Release date: 27 November 1959
- Running time: 74 minutes
- Country: East Germany
- Language: German

Musterknaben (Role Models; English-language title: The Goodies; also known as Das Beschwerdebuch or Alles aus Liebe) is an East German romantic comedy film, directed by Johannes Knittel. It was originally released in the GDR in 1959 and again in Hungary in 1960.

== Plot ==
Bassi and Edwin are the two laziest, most irresponsible construction workers in their workers' brigade. When they fall in love with their neighbors Thea and Susi, they pretend to be reliable young men and accompany their friends to a meeting of the local chapter house. To keep up appearances, the two are forced to undertake several duties which they would not have dreamed of doing otherwise. The plot turns into a chain of comical mistakes, but eventually the two new couples reunite and all ends well.

== Cast ==
- Hartmut Reck as Bassi
- Rolf Herricht as Edwin
- Brigitte Krause as Thea
- Gudrun Wicherta s Susi
- Erwin Geschonneck as Susi's father
- Peter Marx as Kaiser
- Fritz Diez as Weber
- Paul R. Henker as Scholz
- Hans Klering as Grimm
- Werner Lierck as Tetzlaff
- Gerd Biewer as Graf
- Sabine Thalbach as Röschen
- Jean Brahn as Fritz
- Agnes Kraus as old teacher
- Lotte Loebinger as Klara
- Werner Dissel as uncredited role

== Reception ==
The West German Catholic Film Service regarded the film as one "with a weak plot line, the same old gags used over and over again." The film critic of the journal Cinema wrote that "even in the 1950s, it was not witty."
