= Tatort Berlin =

1958 East German film

- Directed by: Joachim Kunert
- Edited by: Evelyn Carow
- Release date: 1958
- Country: East Germany
- Language: German

Tatort Berlin is an East German film. It was released in 1958.
