= Spielbank-Affäre =

1957 film

- Directed by: Arthur Pohl
- Starring: Gertrud Kückelmann; Jan Hendriks; Peter Pasetti; Rudolf Forster
- Release date: 1957
- Country: East Germany
- Language: German

Spielbank-Affäre is an East German film. It was released in 1957.

The film is set in West Germany, starring actors from the West German film industry.
