= Gerhard Klein =

German film director, politician and screenwriter (1920–1970)

- Born: 1 May 1920; Berlin, Germany
- Died: 21 May 1970 (aged 50); East Berlin, East Germany
- Occupations: film director, screenwriter, actor

Gerhard Klein (1 May 1920 – 21 May 1970) was a German film director and screenwriter.

== Biography ==
Klein was the son of a lathe operator and pursued filmmaking autodidactically from a young age. He was arrested twice for his activities in the Communist Party's resistance organization. He served in the Wehrmacht during the Second World War. After the war he was active in the KPD's main youth committee and at the Berlin Magistrate's Youth Office and worked as an animator.

From 1946 he worked at DEFA, initially as a screenwriter for short films, and soon also as an assistant director in the DEFA studio for newsreels and documentaries. In 1952, Klein moved to the DEFA studio for feature films. It was then that he met his future wife, the children's writer Rosel Klein.

After a study trip to the USSR, Klein played a key role in establishing the DEFA children's film studio. With Alarm im Zirkus (Alarm in the Circus), he established the model for films which reported on divided Berlin in a documentary style. Berlin – Ecke Schönhauser (Berlin – Schönhauser Corner) was the first film to reveal the problem of juvenile delinquents in the eastern part of the city.

After The Gleiwitz Case, in which Klein reconstructed the staged attack on the Gleiwitz radio station, he devoted his subsequent films to depicting everyday life in East Germany. From 1963 to 1967, Klein was a member of the Volkskammer.

Klein fell ill in the spring of 1970 during the filming of the movie Leichensache Zernik and died shortly afterwards.

== Filmography ==
- 1950: Für ein einiges, glückliches Vaterland (short film)
- 1951: Aladin (Regie, Drehbuch)
- 1954: Alarm in the Circus (director)
- 1956: A Berlin Romance (director)
- 1957: Berlin – Ecke Schönhauser… (director)
- 1958: Geschichte vom armen Hassan (director)
- 1958: Der Schinderhannes (actor)
- 1959: Seltsame Jagd (director)
- 1961: Ein Sommertag macht keine Liebe (director)
- 1961: The Gleiwitz Case (director)
- 1963: Sonntagsfahrer (director)
- 1965: Berlin um die Ecke (director)
- 1965: Denk bloß nicht, ich heule (actor)
- 1967: Geschichten jener Nacht (Episode 4 – director)
- 1972: Leichensache Zernik (screenwriter, film finished posthumously)
