= Die Unbesiegbaren =

1953 film

- Directed by: Arthur Pohl
- Starring: Willy A. Kleinau; Werner Peters; Karl Paryla; Erwin Geschonneck
- Release date: 1953
- Country: East Germany
- Language: German

Die Unbesiegbaren is an East German film. It was released in 1953. Werner Peters was one of the actors.
