= Zwischenfall in Benderath =

1956 film

- Directed by: János Veiczi
- Release date: 1956
- Country: East Germany
- Language: German

Zwischenfall in Benderath is an East German film. It was released in 1956.
