= Rivalen am Steuer =

1957 film

- Directed by: Ernst Wilhelm Fiedler
- Release date: 1957
- Country: East Germany
- Language: German

Rivalen am Steuer is an East German film. It was released in 1957.
