= Die Störenfriede =

1953 East German children's film by Wolfgang Schleif

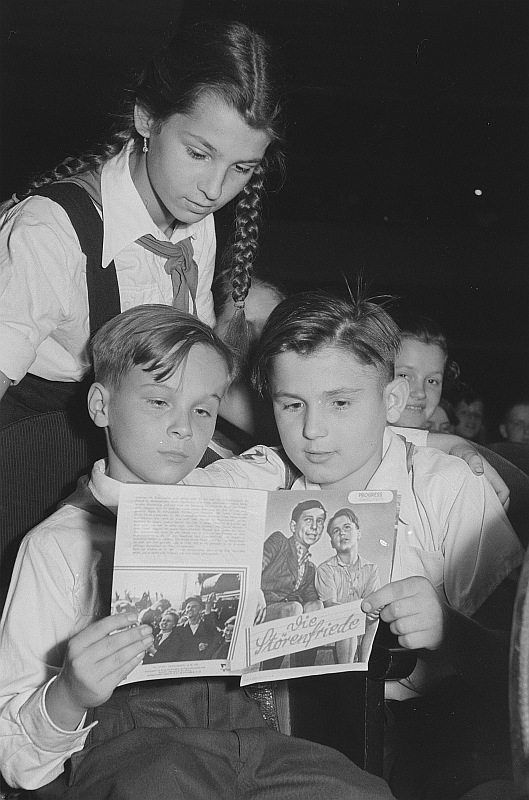
- Three children reading the prospectus for the film
- Directed by: Wolfgang Schleif
- Music by: Joachim Werzlau
- Distributed by: DEFA
- Release date: 1953
- Country: East Germany
- Language: German

Die Störenfriede (The Troublemakers) is an East German children's film directed by Wolfgang Schleif. It was released in 1953.

== See also ==
- List of East German films
