= Walter Kaufmann (author) =

German-Australian writer (1924–2021)

- Born: Jizchak Schmeidler; 24 January 1924; Berlin, Germany
- Died: 15 April 2021 (aged 97); Berlin, Germany
- Other name: John Mercator
- Years active: 1953–2021
- Notable work: Voices In The Storm; The Curse Of Maralinga
- Spouses: Barbara; Angela Brunner
- Parent(s): Rachela Schmeidler; Dr. Sally and Johanna Kaufmann (adoptive)

Walter Kaufmann (19 January 1924 – 15 April 2021) was a German-Australian writer.

Kaufmann was born Jizchak Schmeidler in Berlin, the son of a Polish Jewish woman, Rachela Schmeidler. He was adopted by the wealthy German Jewish couple Dr. Sally and Johanna Kaufmann at the age of three. While his adoptive parents were eventually murdered in Auschwitz, Kaufmann fled to England during the outbreak of the War, and was later deported to Australia on the ship HMT Dunera in 1940. He joined the Australian army as a volunteer. After the war and demobilisation he worked in different environments and various jobs at the same time trying to further his education.

Kaufmann joined the Melbourne Realist Writers' Group and had some of his stories published in the Realist Writer. He became politically active and travelled. He was encouraged by writers such as Frank Hardy and David Martin to write a novel based on his own past in Nazi Germany (Voices in the Storm). Later Kaufmann settled in the East Berlin and continued publishing in English and German.

Kaufmann's schematic socialist realistic stories on the struggles of Australian trade unionists and the disenfranchisement of Aboriginal people became popular in the GDR after his return to East Berlin in 1957.

He died in April 2021 at the age of 97.

== Works ==
=== English ===
- Voices in the Storm, Melbourne 1953
- The Curse of Maralinga and other Stories, Berlin 1959
- American Encounter, Berlin 1966
- Beyond the Green World of Childhood, Berlin 1972

=== German ===
- Wohin der Mensch gehört. Verlag Neues Leben, Berlin 1957.
- Der Fluch von Maralinga. Translated from English by Johannes Schellenberger. Verlag Neues Leben, Berlin 1958.
- Ruf der Inseln. Translated from English by Hannelore Sanguinette and Elga Abramowitz. Verlag Volk und Welt, Berlin 1960.
- Feuer am Suvastrand. Translated from English by Hannelore Sanguinette, Bernd Hanisch and Elga Abramowitz. Aufbau-Verlag, Berlin 1961.
- Kreuzwege. Verlag Neues Leben, Berlin 1961.
- Die Erschaffung des Richard Hamilton. VEB Hinstorff, Rostock 1964.
- Begegnung mit Amerika heute. Translated from English by Helga Zimnik. VEB Hinstorff, Rostock 1965.
- Unter australischer Sonne. Deutscher Militärverlag, Berlin 1965.
- Hoffnung unter Glas. Translated from English by Helga Zimnik. Hinstorff VEB, Rostock 1966.
- Stefan. Translated from English by Helga Zimnik. Holz, Berlin 1966.
- Unter dem wechselnden Mond. Translated from English by Helga Zimnik. Hinstorff, Rostock 1968.
- Gerücht vom Ende der Welt. Translated from English by William Vietinghoff. Hinstorff, Rostock 1969.
- Unterwegs zu Angela. Translated from English by Olga Fetter and Erich Fetter. Verlag der Nation, Berlin 1973.
- Das verschwundene Hotel. Aus dem Englischen übersetzt von Olga Fetter und Erich Fetter. Verlag Junge Welt, Berlin 1973.
- Am Kai der Hoffnung. Aus dem Englischen übersetzt von Elga Abramowitz u. a. Verlag der Nation, Berlin 1974.
- Entführung in Manhattan. Aus dem Englischen übersetzt von Olga Fetter und Erich Fetter. Kinderbuchverlag, Berlin 1975.
- Patrick. Verlag Junge Welt, Berlin 1977.
- Stimmen im Sturm. Aus dem Englischen übersetzt. Verlag der Nation, Berlin 1977.
- Wir lachen, weil wir weinen. F. A. Brockhaus Verlag, Leipzig 1977.
- Irische Reise. Kinderbuchverlag, Berlin 1979.
- Drei Reisen ins gelobte Land. Brockhaus, Leipzig 1980.
- Kauf mir doch ein Krokodil. Edition Holz, Berlin 1982.
- Flucht. Halle/Leipzig, Mitteldeutscher Verlag 1984.
- Jenseits der Kindheit. Aus dem Englischen übersetzt von Helga Zimnik. Kinderbuchverlag, Berlin 1985.
- Manhattan-Sinfonie. Aus dem Englischen übersetzt von Helga Zimnik und Wilhelm Vietinghoff. Militärverlag der DDR, Berlin 1987, ISBN 3-327-00371-8.
- Tod in Fremantle. Mitteldeutscher Verlag, Halle/Leipzig 1987, ISBN 3-354-00154-2.
- Die Zeit berühren. Berlin 1992, ISBN 3-928024-73-6.
- Ein jegliches hat seine Zeit. Berlin 1994, ISBN 3-86124-215-X.
- Im Schloss zu Mecklenburg und anderswo. Dietz, Berlin 1997, ISBN 3-320-01942-2.
- Über eine Liebe in Deutschland. Dietz, Berlin 1998, ISBN 3-320-01960-0.
- Gelebtes Leben. Dietz, Berlin 2000, ISBN 3-320-01992-9.
- Amerika. Verlag. BS, Rostock 2003, ISBN 3-89954-044-1.
- Die Welt des Markus Epstein. ddp goldenbogen, Dresden 2004, ISBN 3-932434-22-6.
- Im Fluss der Zeit. Ditrich Verlag, Berlin 2010, ISBN 978-3-937717-45-6.
- Stefan - Jenseits der Kindheit. E-Book, EDITION digital, Godern 2012, ISBN 978-3-86394-560-2 (enthält Stefan und Jenseits der Kindheit).

== Filmography ==
- 1967: Frozen Flashes
- 1969: Rendezvous with Unknown

== Awards ==
- Mary Gilmore award (1959)
- Fontane-Preis (1961 and 1964)
- Heinrich Mann Prize (1967)
- Literature Prize of the Ruhr Region (1993)
