= Berlin, Schoenhauser Corner =

1957 film

Berlin – Ecke Schönhauser…
- Directed by: Gerhard Klein
- Written by: Gerhard Klein
- Produced by: Erich Albrecht
- Starring: Ekkehard Schall
- Cinematography: Wolf Göthe
- Edited by: Evelyn Carow
- Music by: Günter Klück
- Production company: DEFA
- Distributed by: Progress Film
- Release date: 30 August 1957
- Running time: 81 minutes
- Country: East Germany
- Language: German

Berlin, Schoenhauser Corner (German: Berlin – Ecke Schönhauser…) is an East German crime film directed by Gerhard Klein. It was released in 1957.

== Plot summary ==
Dieter, Angela, Kohle and Karl-Heinz are part of a group of delinquent youths who prowl Schönhauser Allee, in Berlin's Prenzlauer Berg. The four, each with their troubled life, are often in trouble with the police. Karl-Heinz steals an identity document and uses it to enter West Berlin, where he murders a man while committing armed robbery. The police suspect that his friends assisted him. When he returns, Kohle and Dieter confront Karl-Heinz about an unpaid debt; he threatens them both with a pistol, and Kohle knocks him unconscious. Karl-Heinz recovers and runs away, but Dieter and Kohle believe they have killed Karl-Heinz. Kohle and Dieter get assistance in fleeing to West Berlin, and stay in a home with other young men in the western sector of the city. They plan to get to the Federal Republic of Germany. Before long Dieter wonders whether Karl-Heinz is really dead, and whether it would be safe to return to East Berlin. He is threatened by some of the young men in the home where they are staying. Kohle is concerned that the two friends will be separated. He drinks a solution of coffee and tobacco to feign illness, so he can't be sent away. The next morning, Dieter discovers Kohle dead, poisoned by the beverage. Dieter returns home, where Angela is pregnant with his child, and explains the situation to the police. He is released, while Karl-Heinz is imprisoned.

== Cast ==
- Ekkehard Schall as Dieter
- Ilse Pagé as Angela
- Ernst-Georg Schwill as Kohle
- Harry Engel as Karl-Heinz Erdmann
- Raimund Schelcher as Police commissioner
- Helga Göring as Angela's mother
- Erika Dunkelmann as Kohle's mother
- Maximilian Larsen as Kohle's stepfather
- Ingeborg Beeske as Karl-Heinz's mother
- Siegfried Weiß as Karl-Heinz's father
- Manfred Borges as Dieter's brother
- Hartmut Reck as member of the Free German Youth
- Gerd Michael Henneberg as American man

== Production ==
The screenplay of Berlin – Ecke Schönhauser… was written in summer 1956 - during the early months of the Khrushchev Thaw - and severely criticized by officials in the Ministry of Culture's Cinema Directorate upon its completion. It was seen by the authorities as portraying only the negative side of life in the country. Director Klein did not receive approval to begin filming, but did so anyhow, starting at October. When Klein held a screening of Ecke Schönhauser in the Ministry of Culture, the officials present strongly disapproved of it, and intended to ban it. But when it was presented to the Central Committee of the Free German Youth, Hans Modrow praised Klein's work and declared that it would be beneficial for the populace. The film was approved for release.

Berlin - Ecke Schönhauser... was released only a year after the release of Die Halbstarken (1956) in the Federal Republic of Germany. Die Halbstarken is one of numerous German-made films inspired by the American young rebel films of the 1950s that featured young, male protagonists rebelling against the rule of law and breaking societal norms. Such films were heavily criticized by German officials of the GDR who believed it was the goal of the West to destabilize East German society through the release of such films.

== Reception ==
The film was viewed by 1.5 million watchers in the first twelve weeks after its premiere.

Mira and Antonin Liehm wrote that, while still attacking "West Berlin with the same propagandistic undertone of all DEFA films", it also "took into account the shady aspects of life in the East". Dagmar Schittly noted that the film acknowledged the East German youth's wish to emulate the life in the West, at least partially: on one occasion, Angela states that her model of the ideal man figure is Marlon Brando.

At 1995, Berlin – Ecke Schönhauser… was selected as one of the 100 most important German films in history.
