= List of Euro-Western films =

This list of Euro-Western films includes Western-genre films made in Europe by non-Italian production companies, although the term Euro-Western can sometimes include the Italian-produced spaghetti Western subgenre.

Several Euro-Western films, nicknamed sauerkraut Westerns because they were made in Germany and shot in Yugoslavia, were derived from stories by novelist Karl May, and were film adaptations of May's work. One of the most popular German Western franchises was the Winnetou series, which featured a Native American Apache hero in the lead role.

Some new Euro-Westerns emerged in the 2010s, including: Kristian Levring's The Salvation, Martin Koolhoven's Brimstone and Andreas Prochaska's The Dark Valley.

== List by release date ==
Title	Director	Summary	Released	Notes
Pre-1964
Riffle Bill, le roi de la prairie	Victorin-Hippolyte Jasset	French production. Silent Western in black-and-white. 5 episodes.	1908 (France)	
Der Kaiser von Kalifornien/The Emperor of California	Luis Trenker	Nazi Germany production. Western in black-and-white.	1936 (Nazi Germany)	
The Coyote/El Coyote	Joaquin Luis Romero Marchent/Fernando Soler	Mexican/Spanish production. Western in black-and-white.	5 May 1955 (Spanish)	El Coyote film
Villi Pohjola	Aarne Tarkas	Finnish production. Western in black-and-white	30 September 1955 (Finland)	
The Coyote's Justice/La Justicia del Coyote	Joaquin Luis Romero Marchent	Mexican/Spanish production. Western in black-and-white. It was a sequel to the 1955 film The Coyote.	8 March 1956 (Spanish)	El Coyote film
Juanito/Unsere Heimat ist die ganze Welt	Fernando Palacios	Spanish/Argentine/West German production.	16 March 1960 (West Germany)	
Taste of Violence/Le goût de la violence/Haut für Haut/Febbre di rivolta	Robert Hossein	French/West German/Italian production in black-and-white. Perez (Robert Hossein) kidnaps the President's daughter (Giovanna Ralli), to trade her for imprisoned revolutionaries.	11 August 1961 (West Germany)	
Savage Guns/Tierra brutal	Michael Carreras	United Kingdom/Spanish production. Gunfighter Steve Fallon (Richard Basehart) befriends pacifist farmer Summers (Don Taylor), who is threatened by big landowner Ortega (José Nieto) and his hired gun, Danny (Alex Nicol).	1 November 1961 (Spain)	
Dynamite Jack/Il terrore del Texas	Jean Bastia	French/Italian production. Western comedy featuring Fernandel.	3 November 1961 (France)	
Torrejón City	León Klimovsky	Spanish production	30 October 1962 (Spain)	
Treasure of Silver Lake/Der Schatz im Silbersee/Blago u srebrnom jezeru	Harald Reinl	West German/Yugoslav production.	14 December 1962 (West Germany)	The first entry in the Winnetou series.
Gold of the wild North/Villin Pohjolan kulta	Aarne Tarkas	Finnish production	1 February 1963 (Finland)	Sequel to 'Villi Pohjola' (1955)
The Pirates of the Mississippi/Die Flußpiraten vom Mississippi/Les pirates sur Mississippi/Agguato sul grande fiume	Jürgen Roland	West German/French/Italian production. Based on a novel by Friedrich Gerstäcker	18 October 1963 (West Germany)	
Villin Pohjolan salattu laakso	Aarne Tarkas	Finnish production	8 November 1963 (Finland)	Sequel to 'Villi Pohjola' (1955)
Apache Gold/Winnetou 1/La révolte des indiens Apache/La valle dei lunghi coltelli/Vinetu 1	Harald Reinl	West German/French/Italian/Yugoslav production. Winnetou (Pierre Brice) and his blood brother, Old Shatterhand (Lex Barker), defend the Apache lands from gold hunters.	11 December 1963 (West Germany)	Awards: Goldene Leinwand. Part of the Winnetou series.
1964
Wild West story	Börje Nyberg	Swedish production. Comedy Western, featuring Carl-Gustaf Lindstedt.	15 February 1964 (Sweden)	
The last ride to Santa Cruz/Der Letzte Ritt nach Santa Cruz	Rolf Olsen	West German/Austrian production.	28 March 1964 (West Germany)	
Gunfighters of Casa Grande/Los pistoleros de Casa Grande	Roy Rowland	USA/Spanish production. Bank robber Joe Daylight (Alex Nicol) acquires a Mexican hacienda and helps the other hacienda owners fight bandit El Rojo (Aldo Sambrell). Daylight's secret plan is to rustle their cattle himself, but he meets resistance among his own men, especially from "Traveller" (Jorge Mistral).	1 April 1964 (Spain)	
Old Shatterhand/Les cavaliers rouges/La battaglia di Fort Apache/Old Seterhend	Hugo Fregonese	West German/French/Italian/Yugoslav production.	30 April 1964 (West Germany)	Part of the Winnetou series.
Cavalry Charge/La carga de la policia montada	Ramòn Torrado	Spanish production	4 June 1964 (Spain)	
Relevo para un pistolero	Ramòn Torrado	Spanish production	29 June 1964 (Spain)	
Billy the Kid/Fuera de la ley	León Klimovsky	Spanish production	9 July 1964 (Spain)	
Black angel of the Mississippi/¡Bienvenido, padre Murray!	Ramón Torrado	Spanish production	24 August 1964 (Spain)	
Lemonade Joe/Limonádový Joe aneb Koňská opera	Oldřich Lipský	Czechoslovak production. Comedy Western	28 August 1964 (East Germany)	
Freddy in the Wild West/The Sheriff Was a Lady/Freddy und das Lied der Prärie/6 pallottole per Ringo Kid	Sobey Martin	West German/Yugoslav production, featuring the singer Freddy Quinn.	28 August 1964 (West Germany)	
Last of the Renegades/Winnetou 2/Le trésor des montagnes bleus/Giorni de fuco/Vinetu 2	Harald Reinl	West German/French/Italian/Yugoslav production.	17 September 1964 (West Germany)	Part of the Winnetou series.
Massacre at Marble City/Die Goldsucher von Arkansas/Alla conquista dell'Arkansas/Les chercheurs d'or de l'Arkansas	Paul Martin	West German/Italian/French production. Based on a novel by Friedrich Gerstäcker	20 November 1964 (West Germany)	
Tomb of the Pistolero/La tumba del pistolero/Attento Gringo... ora si spara	Amando de Ossorio	Spanish production	21 November 1964 (Spain)	
Legend of a Gunfighter/Heiss weht der Wind/Mein Freund Shorty	Rolf Olsen	West German/Austrian production.	26 November 1964 (West Germany)	
Among Vultures/Unter Geiern/Là dove scende il sole/Parmi les vautours/Medu jastrebovima	Alfred Vohrer	West German/Italian/French/Yugoslav production.	8 December 1964 (West Germany)	Part of the Winnetou series.
1965
Murieta/Joaquín Murrieta	George Sherman	Spanish production. With Jeffrey Hunter as Joaquin Murrieta	1 February 1965 (Spain)	
The Treasure of the Aztecs/Der Schatz der Azteken/I violenti di Rio Bravo/Les mercenaires du Rio Grande/Blago Acteka	Robert Siodmak	West German/Italian/French/Yugoslav production, based on a book by Karl May.	4 March 1965 (West Germany)	
Black eagle of Santa Fe/Die Schwarzen Adler von Santa Fe/I gringos non perdonano/Les aigles noirs de Santa-Fe	Alberto Cardone/Ernst Hofbauer	West German/Italian/French production.	12 March 1965 (West Germany)	
Man called Gringo/Sie nannten ihn Gringo/La ley del forastero	Roy Rowland	West German/Spanish production.	19 March 1965 (West Germany)	
The Last Tomahawk/Der letzte Mohikaner/La valle della ombre rosse/El utimo mohicano	Harald Reinl	West German/Italian/Spanish production. Based on The Last of the Mohicans, but set more than 100 years later	17 April 1965 (West Germany)	
The bandits of the Rio Grande/Die Banditen vom Rio Grande	Helmuth M. Backhaus	West German production	24 April 1965 (Italy)	
Shoot to Kill/Los cuateros	Ramón Torrado	Spanish production	24 May 1965 (Spain)	
Massacre at Fort Grant/Fuerte perdido	José María Elorrieta	Spanish production. After a US Army fort has been sacked by Apaches, the settler Paul Driscoll (German Cobos) is court-martialed for treason.	31 May 1965 (Spain)	
The Hell of Manitoba/A Place Called Glory/Die Hölle von Manitoba/Un lugar llamando "Glory"	Sheldon Reynolds	West German/Spanish production.	27 July 1965 (West Germany)	
Son of a Gunfighter/El Hijo del Pistolero	Paul Landres	USA/Spanish production.	16 August 1965 (United Kingdom)	
Legacy of the Incas/Das Vermächtnis des Inka/Viva Gringo/El ultiomo rey de los incas	Georg Marischka	West Germany/Italian/Spanish/Bulgarian production, based on a book by Karl May	24 August 1965 (West Germany)	
The Oil Prince/Der Ölprinz/Kralj petroleja	Harald Philipp	West German/Yugoslav production.	25 August 1965 (West Germany)	Part of the Winnetou series.
Duel at Sundown/Duell vor Sonnenuntergang/Sparate a vista su Killer Kid	Leopold Lahola	West German/Italian/Yugoslav production.	17 September 1965 (West Germany)	
Jessy does not forgive... He kills!/Sunscorched/Tierra de fuego/Land des Feuers	Jaime Jesús Balcázar	Spanish/West German production.	1 October 1965 (West Germany)	
The Desperado Trail/Winnetou 3/Vinetu 3	Harald Reinl	West German/Italian/Yugoslav production.	14 October 1965 (West Germany)	Part of the Winnetou series.
Carry On, Cowboy	Gerald Thomas	United Kingdom production	6 November 1965 (United Kingdom)	
Old Surehand/Old Surehand 1. Teil/Lavirint smrti	Alfred Vohrer	West German/Yugoslav production.	14 December 1965 (West Germany)	Part of the Winnetou series.
Django the Condemned/El proscrito del Rio Colorado	Maury Dexter	Spanish production.	22 December 1965 (Spain)	
1966
Count Bobby, the terror of the wild West/Graf Bobby, der Schrecken des wilden Westens	Paul Martin	Austrian/Yugoslav production. Western comedy.	5 January 1966 (West Germany)	Vehicle for singer Peter Alexander
The sons of Great Bear/Die Söhne der großen Bärin	Josef Mach	East German/Yugoslav production.	18 February 1966 (East Germany)	East German Red Western
Who killed Johnny R.?/Wer kennt Johnny R.?/La balada de Johnny Ringo	José Luis Madrid	West German/Spanish production.	19 May 1966 (West Germany)	
Savage Pampas/Pampa Salvaje	Hugo Fregonese	USA/Spanish/Argentine production.	29 July 1966 (West Germany)	
Winnetou and the Crossbreed/Winnetou und das Halbblut Apanatschi/Il giorno più lungo di Kansas City	Harald Philipp	West German/Italian/Yugoslav production.	17 August 1966 (West Germany)	Part of the Winnetou series.
The Trap	Sidney Hayers	United Kingdom productions	15 September 1966 (United Kingdom)	
Two thousand dollars for Coyote/Dos mil dòlares por Coyote/Django... cacciatore di taglia	Leòn Klimovsky	Spanish production	7 October 1966 (Spain)	
Django does not forgive/Mestizio	Julio Buchs	Spanish production	7 October 1966 (Spain)	
Winnetou and Old Firehand/Thunder at the Border/Winnetou und sein Freund Old Firehand/Vinetu i Old Fajerhend	Alfred Vohrer	West German/Yugoslav production.	13 December 1966 (West Germany)	Part of the Winnetou series.
1967
Seven for Pancho Villa/Los 7 de Pancho Villa	José María Elorrieta	Spanish production	2 March 1967 (Spain)	
Christmas Kid/Joe Navidad	Sidney W. Pink	USA/Spanish production.	1 July 1967 (USA)	
Chingachgook, die große Schlange	Richard Groschopp	East German production	29 December 1967 (East Germany)	East German Red Western
1968
Spur des Falken	Gottfried Kolditz	East German/Soviet Union production.	22 June 1968 (East Germany)	East German Red Western
Shalako/Man nennt mich Shalako	Edward Dmytryk	United Kingdom/West German production. A hunting party of European aristocrats trespasses into Apache territory, with dire consequences. Shalako (Sean Connery) has a hard time rescuing survivors, but he does win the favor of a countess (Brigitte Bardot).	26 September 1968 (West Germany)	
Secret of Captain O'Hara/El secreto del capitán O'Hara	Arturo Ruiz Castillo	Spanish production	22 October 1968 (Spain)	
The Valley of Death/Winnetou und Shatterhand im Tal der Toten/L'uomo dal lungo fucile/Vinetu u dolini smrti	Harald Reinl	West German/Italian/Yugoslav production.	12 December 1968 (West Germany)	Part of the Winnetou series.
White Comanche/Comanche blanco	José Briz Méndez	Spanish production. Johnny Moon (William Shatner) is frequently mistaken for his twin brother, who leads Comanche raids. Johnny challenges him to a fight to the death and also gets involved in conflicts in a Western town.	23 December 1968 (Spain)	
Love and Blood/Agapi kai aima	Nikos Foskolos	Greek production	24 December 1968 (Greece)	
The last of the Mohicans/Ultimul Mohican/Die Lederstrumpferzählungen: Der letzte Mohikaner	Jean Dréville/Pierre Gaspard-Huit/Sergiu Nicolaescu	Romanian/French/West German production.	31 December 1968 (Romania)	
1969
Weiße Wölfe/Bijeli vukovi	Konrad Petzold/Boško Boškovič	East German/Yugoslav production.	25 June 1969 (East Germany)	East German Red Western
Twenty Thousand Dollars for Every Corpse/20.000 dòlares por un cadavers	José Maria Zabalza	Spanish production. An Anglo-only story of a rancher, who gets into trouble with an outlaw gang brought in, to stop the construction of a railroad.	6 December 1969 (Spain)	
1970
Tumba para un forajido	José Luis Madrid	Spanish production	9 April 1970 (Italy)	
Fatal Error/Tödlicher Irrtum	Konrad Petzold	East German production	3 July 1970 (East Germany)	East German Red Western
Wind from the East/Le Vent d'est/Vento dell'Est/Ostwind	Jean-Luc Godard/Jean-Pierre Gorin	French/Italian/West German production.	19 August 1970 (France)	
Tough Guys of the Prairie/Præriens skrappe drenge	Carl Ottosen	Danish production. Featuring Danish comedian Dirch Passer.	31 August 1970 (Denmark)	Followed by Gold for the Tough Guys of the Prairie.
Deadlock/Duello a tre	Roland Klick	West German production. A man, called 'Kid' (Marquard Bohm), wanders through the desert exhausted; he carries a suitcase. His arm is bleeding from a gunshot. Finally passing out from the heat and blood loss, he lays prone, until Charles Dump (Mario Adorf), a loner living in the shell of an abandoned mining camp, finds him passed out in the middle of nowhere. Dump checks the man's luggage and finds it filled with millions of dollars... (also Anthony Dawson, Mascha Rabben, Betty Segal).	15 October 1970 (West Germany)	shot in the Negev Desert, Israel
Plomo sobre Dallas	José Maria Zabalza	Spanish production	24 December 1970 (Spain)	
1971
Osceola	Konrad Petzold	East German/Bulgarian/Cuban production.	26 June 1971 (East Germany)	East German Red Western
The Unhanged/Hirttämättömät	Spede Pasanen/Vesa-Matti Loiri	Finnish production. Comedy Western.	27 August 1971 (Finland)	
Gold for the Tough Guys of the Prairie/Guld til præriens skrappe drenge	Finn Karlsson	Danish production. Featuring Danish comedian Dirch Passer.	30 August 1971 (Denmark)	Sequel to Tough Guys of the Prairie.
Hannie Caulder	Burt Kennedy	United Kingdom production	8 November 1971 (United Kingdom)	
Four Rode Out/Cuatro cabalgaron	John Peyser	USA/Spanish production.	11 December 1971 (Spain)	
A Girl is a Gun/Une aventure de Billy le Kid	Luc Moullet	French production	27 December 1971	Never released in France, but shown abroad in an English-dubbed version.
1972
Vente a ligar al Oeste	Pedro Lazaga	Spanish production	24 January 1972 (Spain)	
Chato's land	Michael Winner	United Kingdom production	1 April 1972 (United Kingdom)	
Tecumseh	Hans Kratzert	East German production	1 July 1972 (East Germany)	East German Red Western
Cut-Throats Nine/Condenados a vivir	Joaquín Luis Romero Marchent	Spanish production. US Cavalrymen are killed while escorting a group of convicts to prison. The survivors, Sergeant Brown (Robert Hundar) and his daughter (Emma Cohen), are forced to escort the prisoners across the Rocky Mountains by foot.	10 July 1972 (Spain)	
Cry of the Black Wolves/Der Schrei der schwarzen Wölfe	Harald Reinl	West German production	4 October 1972 (West Germany)	Based on a novel by Jack London.
Pancho Villa/El desafio de Pancho Villa	Eugenio Martín	Spanish/United Kingdom/USA production. After being double-crossed in an arms deal, the Mexican revolutionary Pancho Villa (Telly Savalas) together with arms dealer Scotty (Clint Walker) raid a US Army weapons depot, in retaliation.	31 October 1972 (West Germany)	
The Call of the Wild/Ruf der Wildnis/La selva blanca/Il richiamo della foresta/L'appel de la forêt	Ken Annakin	United Kingdom/West German/Spanish/Italian/French production.	29 December 1972 (West Germany)	Based on a novel by Jack London.
The Headless Rider/Vsadnik bez golovy	Vladimir Vajnshtok	Soviet Union/Cuban production.	30 December 1972 (Soviet Union)	Based on a novel by Thomas Mayne Reid.
1973
Fat brothers of Trinity/Ninguno de los tres llamaba Trinidad	Pedro Luis Ramirez	Spanish production	10 January 1973 (Italy)	
Dust in the Sun/Dans la poussière du soleil	Richard Balducci	French/Spanish production. Joe Bradford (Bob Cunningham) has his brother whipped to death and marries his widow (Maria Schell). Hawk (Daniel Beretta), the son of the victim, pretends to be deaf, mute and mentally disturbed. Based on William Shakespeare's 'Hamlet'.	28 March 1973 (France)	
Charley One-Eye	Don Chaffey	USA/United Kingdom production.	18 April 1973	
Far West	Jacques Brel	French/Belgian production.	31 May 1973 (France)	
Apaches/Apachen	Gottfried Kolditz	East German production	29 June 1973 (East Germany)	East German Red Western
Yankee Dudler/Verflucht, dies Amerika/La banda de Jaider	Volker Vogeler	West German/Spanish production.	7 September 1973 (West Germany)	
The bloody vultures of Alaska/Hell Hounds of Alaska/Die blutigen Geier von Alaska/Krvavi jastrebovi Aljaske	Harald Reinl	West German/Yugoslav production.	16 October 1973 (West Germany)	
Scalawag/Un magnifico ceffo di galera/Protuva	Kirk Douglas	USA/Italian/Yugoslav production.	14 November 1973 (USA)	
Ay, Ay, Sheriff	Rolf Olsen	West German production	24 December 1973 (Italy)	
Tschetan, der Indianerjunge	Hark Bohm	West German production	29 December 1973 (West Germany)	
1974
Ulzana	Gottfried Kolditz	East German/Romanian/Soviet Union production.	16 May 1974 (East Germany)	East German Red Western
Long ride to Eden/Ein langer Ritt nach Eden	Günter Hendel	West German production	2 August 1974 (West Germany)	
Kit & Co	Konrad Petzold	East German/Soviet Union production.	15 December 1974 (East Germany)	
Convoy of Women/Convoi des femmes	Pierre Chevalier	French/Italian production.	16 December 1974	Sexploitation Western
Gunfight at OQ Corral/Règlement de comptes à O.Q. Corral	Jean-Marie Pallardy	French production	22 December 1974 (France)	Sexploitation Western
1975
Girls of the Golden Saloon/Les Filles du Golden Saloon	Gilbert Roussel	French/Belgian production.	23 May 1975 (France)	Sexploitation Western
Valley of the Dancing Widows/Das Tal der tanzenden Witwen/El valle de las viudas	Volker Vogeler	West German/Spanish production.	23 May 1975 (West Germany)	
Dead Man's Trail/I död mans spår	Mats Helge	Swedish production	2 June 1975 (Sweden)	
Blood Brothers/Blutsbrüder	Werner W. Wallroth	East German production	26 June 1975 (East Germany)	East German Red Western
If You Shoot... You Live!/Si quieres vivir... dispara	José María Elorrieta	Spanish production	1975 (Spain)	
1976
Montana Trap/Potato Fritz	Peter Schamoni	West German production.	6 May 1976 (West Germany)	
Trini	Walter Beck	East German production.	14 December 1976 (East Germany)	East German Red Western
1977
Welcome to Blood City	Peter Sasdy	United Kingdom/Canadian production.	23 August 1977 (Canada)	
Another Man, Another Chance/Un autre homme, une autre chance	Claude Lelouch	USA/French production.	28 September 1977 (France)	
Armed and Dangerous/Vooruzhyon i ochen opasen	Vladimir Vajnshtok	Soviet Union/Czechoslovak/Romanian production.	1977 (Soviet Union)	Based on short stories by Bret Harte
The prophet, the gold and the Transylvanians/Profetul, aurul şi ardelenii	Dan Pița	Romanian production	1977 (Romania)	
1978
Lost gold of the Incas/Das Verschollene Inka-Gold/L'or des Incas/Omul de aur	Wolfgang Staudte	West German/French/Romanian production.	6 May 1978 (West Germany)	
Severino	Claus Dobberke	East German production	30 June 1978 (East Germany)	East German
Eagle's Wing	Anthony Harvey	United Kingdom production	23 November 1978 (Finland)	

== See also ==
- List of Spaghetti Western films
