= DEFA Indianerfilm =

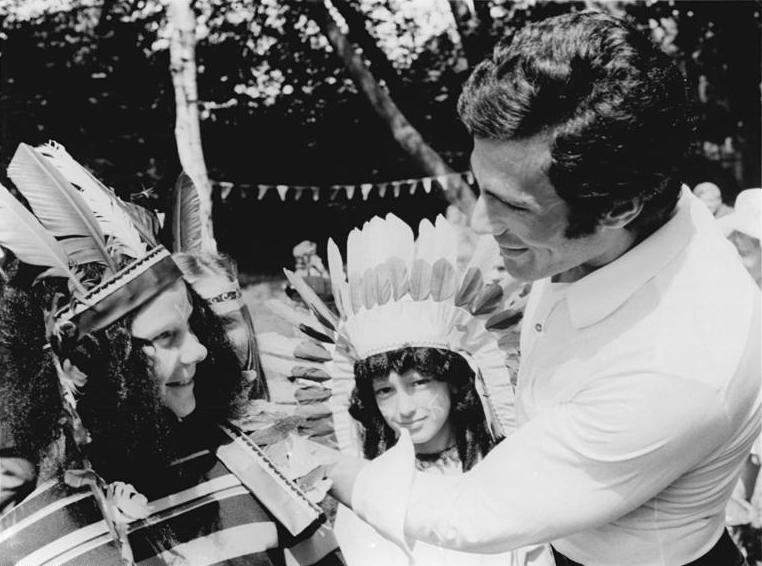
Gojko Mitić, at the Summer FIlm Days, 1971

DEFA Indianerfilme ("DEFA Indian films") was a series of adventure and western films ("Red Westerns") produced by the GDR DEFA film studio. The name comes from the obsolete term "Indians" for Indigenous peoples of the Americas.

Between 1966 and 1983 DEFA produced 14 films of this type, about the resistance of Native Americans against white invaders. A memorable actor in the series was Yugoslavian (Serbian) actor Gojko Mitić portraying fictional Native Americans ("Indians"), "Winnetou of the East", who played in 12 of these films.

The films are searchable in the PROGRESS film database.

== Films ==
Below are the 14 Indianerfilme and a parody.

=== DEFA division "Roter Kreis" ===
- 1966: The Sons of Great Bear, based on the novel The Sons of the Great Bear
- 1967: Chingachgook, The Great Serpent
- 1968: Spur des Falken, Trail of the Falcon
- 1969: Weiße Wölfe, White Wolves
- 1970: Tödlicher Irrtum, Fatal error
- 1971: Osceola
- 1972: Tecumseh
- 1973: Apachen, Apaches
- 1974: Ulzana
- 1975: Blood Brothers
- 1978: Severino

=== DEFA division "Johannisthal" ===
- 1979: Blauvogel, Bluebird
- 1983: Der Scout. The Scout
- 1985: Atkins

=== DEFA division "Berlin" ===
- 1982: de:Der lange Ritt zur Schule, children's comedy, parodying Indianerfilme

== Other "Red Western" films of DEFA ==
- 1981: de:Sing, Cowboy, sing, a comedy Western
- 1988: de:Präriejäger in Mexiko [Prairie Hunters in Mexico] two-series TV film

== See also ==
- Native Americans in German popular culture
