= Inka Unverzagt =

German ballerina and choreographer (1924–2016)

Inka Unverzagt (married name Ingeborg Schmitz-Unverzagt (18 April 1924 – 1 October 2016) was a German ballerina, ballet master, choreographer and dance teacher. She worked at the Hans Otto Theater in Potsdam and for DEFA.

== Life ==
Unverzagt was born in 1924 as the daughter of a comedian and a costume seamstress in Chemnitz. At the request of her father, she received her first ballet lessons at the age of six. She was also taught piano and accordion. She soon became an eleve at the Theater Chemnitz, where she was supported by a patron of the arts. After nine years of ballet studies, she graduated from the Leipzig Opera in 1939.

At the age of 15 she was engaged at the Staatstheater Augsburg. Until the end of the war in 1945, she then worked as a solo dancer at the Theater Plauen-Zwickau, but was also used in the so-called "Fronttheater". Since that time, she used her pseudonym Inka Unverzagt.

In 1946, she became principal dancer and youngest ballet mistress at the Mittelsächsisches Theater. There, in 1947, Fritz Reuter's adaptation of her ballet Henrikje premiered. From 1952 to 1954, she worked at the Rostock People's Theatre, where her most important role was Juliet in Prokofiev's Romeo and Juliet. In 1954, she moved to the Hans Otto Theatre in Potsdam. There she was involved in performances of, among others, Cinderella, Coppélia and Scheherazade. In 1955, she choreographed the premiere of the Singspiel-Operetta Aus dem Regen in die Traufe by Paul Noack-Ihlenfeld and Rolf Zimmermann. Although the artistic directors Ilse Rodenberg and Gerhard Meyer were very open to ballet, the company was disbanded in the mid-1960s. She then worked as a freelance choreographer and dancer at DEFA, where she took part in 60 productions. Among others, she worked with the actor Gojko Mitić. In the 1970s she was again engaged for musical theatre productions at the Hans Otto Theatre.

She was also a guest lecturer at the Konrad Wolf Film University of Babelsberg, supervised the dance ensemble of the Stahl- und Walzwerk Hennigsdorf for 20 years and was involved with the children's ballet "Inka-Girls". After a fall, she had to end her teaching activities in the 2000s.

Unverzagt was married to the actor Willy Schmitz († 1987). She lived in Potsdam from 1954. She died in 2016 at the age of 92 in the Evangelische Seniorenzentrum Hasenheyer-Stift in Potsdam. Her estate is in the collection of the Filmmuseum Potsdam.

== Filmography ==
- 1954/55: Swelling Melodies (performer)
- 1958: Der junge Engländer (performer)
- 1964: Die goldene Gans (choreographer)
- 1967/68: Spur des Falken (choreographer)
- 1972/73: Das unsichtbare Visier – 1st sequel: Der römische Weg (performer)
- 1972/73: Das unsichtbare Visier – 2nd sequel: Das Nest im Urwald (performer)
- 1972/73: Das unsichtbare Visier – 3rd sequel: Das Wasserschloß (performer)
- 1973/74: Für die Liebe noch zu mager? (choreographer)
- 1974: Kit & Co (choreographer)
- 1975: Till Eulenspiegel (choreographer)
- 1976: In the Dust of the Stars (choreographer)
- 1979/80: The Fiancee (performer)

== Publications ==
- Unverzagtes aus Potsdam und von anderswo. Gedichte. I. Unverzagt, Potsdam 2012.
