= Helmut Schreiber =

- Born: 16 November 1925; Mühlhausen, Germany
- Died: 10 February 1995 (aged 69); Bad Reichenhall, Germany
- Occupation: Actor
- Years active: 1954–1988

Helmut Schreiber (16 November 1925 – 10 February 1995) was a German actor. He appeared in more than ninety films from 1954 to 1988.

== Selected filmography ==
Year	Title	Role	Notes
1954	Stärker als die Nacht		
1963	For Eyes Only		
1964	Follow Me, Scoundrels		
1965	The Story of a Murder		
1967	Bread and Roses		
1967	Frozen Flashes		
1967	Pinocchio		
1967	Chingachgook, die große Schlange		
1968	Spur des Falken		
1969	Seine Hoheit – Genosse Prinz		
1969	Weiße Wölfe		
1971	Husaren in Berlin		
1972	Tecumseh		
1972	Valter Brani Sarajevo	Oberstleutnant Weiland	
1983	Zille and Me		
