= The Sons of Great Bear =

1966 East German Western film

- 1966 poster of The Sons of Great Bear
- Directed by: Josef Mach
- Screenplay by: Margot Beichler; Hans-Joachim Wallstein
- Based on: Die Söhne der großen Bärin series by Liselotte Welskopf-Henrich
- Produced by: Hans Mahlich
- Starring: Gojko Mitić
- Cinematography: Jaroslav Tuzar
- Edited by: Ilse Peters
- Music by: Wilhelm Neef
- Production companies: DEFA; Bosna Film Sarajevo
- Distributed by: Progress Film
- Release dates: 18 February 1966 (GDR); 8 July 1966 (ČSSR); 2 January 1967 (USSR); 10 February 1967 (FRG)
- Running time: 92 minutes
- Country: German Democratic Republic
- Languages: German and Mongolian
- Box office: 4,800,000 East German Mark (GDR; 1966)

The Sons of Great Bear (German: Die Söhne der großen Bärin; literally, The Sons of the Great She-Bear) is a 1966 East German Western film, directed by the Czechoslovak filmmaker Josef Mach and starring the Yugoslav actor Gojko Mitić in the leading role of Tokei-ihto. The script was adapted from the eponymous series of novels by author Liselotte Welskopf-Henrich, and the music composed by Wilhelm Neef. The picture is a revisionist Western, pioneering the genre of the Ostern, and emphasises the positive portrayal of Native Americans, while presenting the Whites as antagonists. It is one of the most successful pictures produced by the DEFA film studio, known for its series of "Indian films".

== Plot ==
In 1874, the U.S. government encroaches on the lands of the Lakota people. Mattotaupa, an Oglala Lakota man, gambles with Red Fox, a White criminal, in a saloon. When seeing he has gold, Red Fox demands to know its origin. Mattotaupa refuses, and Red Fox murders him. Mattotaupa's son, the young and fierce warrior Tokei-ihto who distrusts the Whites and never drinks their "Firewater", witnesses the murder.

Two years later, Tokei-ihto is the war chieftain of the Oglala's Bear Band and one of Crazy Horse's commanders in the Great Sioux War. He raids a resupply column sent to a U.S. Army fort, but brings the commander's daughter Katie Smith to her father unharmed, requesting to negotiate peace. Major Smith turns him down, and one of his officers tries to shoot the chieftain, who then surprises the soldiers and single-handedly destroys their munitions depot.

The warriors return to their camp victorious. Red Fox arrives, offering a peace treaty. Tokei-ihto is sent to negotiate. Smith demands they settle in a reservation. When Tokei-ihto rejects the offer, he is imprisoned. The Bear Band are brutally forced to resettle.

After several months, the war has ended. Red Fox enters Tokei-ihto's cell, trying to force him to reveal the location of the gold mine. Katie Smith and her friend Adams stop him before he begins to torture the captive. They recommend that after being released, he should take his people to Canada. The chieftain accepts the government's terms and returns to the reservation.

Tokei-ihto ventures to the sacred caves of the Great She-Bear, the Band's Totem animal, which are also the gold's source, to seek the blessing of the spirits for their departure. Red Fox's henchman Pitt goes after him, hoping to find gold. He stumbles upon a she-bear which kills him, though not before he fatally wounds her with a gunshot. Tokei-ihto finds the she-bear's cub. He takes it back to the tribe.

The Bear Band leave. They raid an army column, and General George Crook offers a $200 reward on the chieftain's head. Red Fox, still seeking the gold, sets after them with a large group of ruffians. They gain on the Lakota as they cross the Missouri River. Red Fox agrees to let the people move on undisturbed if Tokei-ihto remains behind. The chieftain agrees. After a prolonged fight, he manages to kill Red Fox. The band settle on the other bank, finding refuge.

== Cast ==
- Gojko Mitić as Tokei-ihto (voiced by Karl Sturm)
- Jiří Vršťala as Jim Fred 'Red Fox' Clark (voiced by Fred Düren)
- Hans Finohr as Hawandschita
- Günter Schubert as Feldger
- Hannjo Hasse as Pitt
- Horst Kube as Thomas
- Henry Hübchen as Hapedah
- Adolf Peter Hoffmann as Mattotaupa
- Sepp Klose as Tȟašúŋke Witkó
- Franz Bonnet as Crazy Horse the elder
- Kati Székely as Uinonah (Winúŋna)
- Rolf Römer as Tobias
- Hans Hardt-Hardtloff as Major Samuel Smith
- Gerhard Rachold as Lieutenant Roach
- Horst Jonischkan as Adams
- Jozef Adamovič as Chapa (voiced by Klaus Bergatt)
- Blanche Kommerell as Eenah
- Milan Jablonský as Mountain Thunder (voiced by Lothar Schellhorn)
- Helmut Schreiber as Ben
- Rolf Ripperger as Joe
- Brigitte Krause as Jenny
- Karin Beewen as Cate Smith
- Ruth Kommerell as Tashina
- Zofia Słaboszowska as Mongshongsha (voiced by Ursula Mundt)
- Slobodanka Marković as Sitopanaki (voiced by Gertrud Adam)
- Jozef Majerčík as Chetansapa (voiced by Ezard Haußmann)
- Martin Ťapák as Shonka (voiced by Horst Manz)
- Walter E. Fuß as Theo
- Jozo Lepetić as Bill (voiced by Horst Schön)
- Herbert Dirmoser as Old Crow
- Willi Schrade as Tatokano
- Dietmar Richter-Reinick as Lieutenant Warner

== Production ==
=== Background ===
The Western genre had never enjoyed the approval of the political establishment in the German Democratic Republic: the novels of Karl May, the most prominent German-language author associated with the topic, were not allowed to be re-published in the country until 1982. The Socialist Unity Party of Germany, the ruling power in East Germany, viewed May as a writer whose supposedly positive portrayal of the colonisation of the Old West by the United States ignored the uprooting and genocide of Native Americans while glorifying the white settlers, making him a promoter and a precursor of an expansionist ideology of "blood and soil" and – in the words of Klaus Mann – the "Cowboy mentor of the Führer".

East Germany had its own writers who dealt with the subject, though. The Munich-born Liselotte Welskopf-Henrich composed a first draft of a novel set in the land of the Sioux in 1918, when she was 17 years old. After the end of the Second World War, Henrich joined the Communist Party of Germany and settled in East Berlin, where she held a tenure as a Classics professor at the Humboldt University of Berlin. She finished her book in 1951. The following year, it was published under the title The Sons of Great Bear, gaining wide success among children and youth. It became the basis for an eponymous hexalogy of novels about the adventures of Harka, an Oglala Lakota who would eventually be given the name Tokei-ihto. Henrich's books were written from the Native American perspective, and she studied Lakota culture extensively to convey an authentic depiction of them, and even conducted several tours to the United States and Canada to live among their tribes. Her books were translated into 18 languages and sold 7.5 million copies worldwide.

=== Inception ===
The attitude of the DEFA studio – the country's state-owned cinema monopoly – to Westerns changed in the early 1960s, with the release of a wave of Karl May films produced in West Germany, especially the series directed by Harald Reinl which began with Apache Gold in 1963. While not distributed in the GDR, East German tourists could view them when vacationing in neighboring Czechoslovakia. The extensive popularity of those pictures convinced DEFA officials to make their own version. Producer Hans Mahlich – one of the veteran members of the studio who participated in the making of some of DEFA's most widely known pictures, like Castles and Cottages and The Sailor's Song – was the first to promote the idea, arguing that such films would become a great commercial success. While seeking to exploit the popularity of the subject, the studio directors had to consider the ideological demands of the establishment, which would have viewed a typical Western as a reactionary and a "bourgeoisie" form of art – indeed, Der Spiegel reported that several years earlier, an attempt to turn Henrich's novels into a film was "vetoed by the party, which negatively deemed the Westerns as a capitalistic influence that would encourage criminality." Therefore, they sought to imbue the planned picture with themes which would suit state officials and turn it into "politically correct entertainment": Henrich's novels, with their emphasis on the negative portrayal of the white colonists and their already established popularity with the audience, were selected to be adapted to the screen. Welskopf-Henrich had herself proposed the novel to DEFA in 1962, asking for "a historical-social character drama", not an adventure or children's film, and wrote her own script. Studio dramaturgue Günter Karl wrote: "We knew we had to set ourselves apart from the capitalist movies of the genre... But we were nevertheless forced to use at least part of the elements that make this genre so effective." Liselotte Welskopf-Henrich told an interviewer that "in their themes, the West German Karl May films lag far behind good American pictures in which the Native American and his right to self-defense were already recognized. We attempted to make a new sort of an 'Indian film'."

=== Development ===
While the studio accepted the idea of making a Western, most of its filmmakers regarded it with skepticism, and did not believe it would garner success. When Mahlich sought a director for his upcoming production, no East German agreed to participate, as none was ready to risk his reputation. He had to enlist the Czechoslovak director Josef Mach, and his fellow countryman Jaroslav Tuzar as cinematographer. In a trait that would characterize all of DEFA's Westerns, while The Sons of Great Bear was an East German work, the production team was multinational, with citizens of several other Eastern Bloc countries. Welskopf-Henrich wanted the Lakota to be played by Native people from Canada, so that they would not be represented by outsiders – "a modern view for the 1960s", in the words of the film historian Anett Werner-Burgmann. She had visited the Lakota community at Wood Mountain, Saskatchewan, in 1963 and won the interest of some of its residents in playing the leading roles. The production team never considered letting Native people represent themselves; its stated aim was "to cast the Indian roles as far as possible with foreign actors unknown to the audience". In early 1965, Mahlich traveled to the Socialist Federal Republic of Yugoslavia in order to arrange filming locations and to seek actors. Shortly before returning to the GDR, he stumbled upon a film publicity photograph which featured Gojko Mitić. Mitić, a student of the Sport and Physical Education Faculty in the University of Belgrade, worked as a stuntman and an extra in several Westerns produced in his country, beginning with 1963's Old Shatterhand. He was finally given a minor role of his own in Among Vultures. Mahlich immediately resolved to have him star in the role of Tokei-ihto. As Mitić did not master German, he was dubbed by Karl Sturm. GDR-based Czechoslovak actor Jiří Vršťala, who was mainly known as children's star Clown Ferdinand, was given the role of chief villain Red Fox. The young Henry Hübchen depicted a Lakota man in one of his earliest appearances on screen. Tokei-ihto's sister Uinonah was depicted by New York-born Kati Székely, whose father, Hungarian screenwriter János 'Hans' Székely, left the United States during the McCarthy era.

A central feature of the production was the striving for authenticity and the resolve to reverse the genre conventions by stressing the Native American perspective: The film "shifted the focus to natives solely as victims and Americans as perpetrators". Theodore C. Van Alst, who studied the depiction of Native Americans in European film, noted that as it was made "many miles from the Great Plains... Many years after the events" The Sons of Great Bear "was bound to contain some inaccuracies, but they aren't from a lack of effort". However, while carefully recreating the lives of the Lakota, there are several mistakes in regards to the other side: for example, Major Samuel Smith clearly wears the rank of a colonel; a regimental flag in his headquarters carries the inscription "United States of Amerika", and a map shows the U.S.-Mexican Border as it was before the Treaty of Guadalupe Hidalgo, with Mexico stretching all the way to Oregon. Henrich, who served as the producers' adviser, was "fanatic about details": when several horses refused to be mounted without a saddle and had to be fitted with one, she resigned her post, insisting that Native Americans rode bareback. DEFA had a new screenplay written behind her back; after a long dispute, the author demanded that her name be removed from the credits. It was dropped as screenwriter, and the credits kept only "based on the novel of the same name by Liselotte Welskopf-Henrich". Shocked by what she perceived as stereotypes and factual errors in the film, in December 1966 she threatened DEFA with legal action over any further adaptations of her novels, saying "too many liberties were taken".

Principal photography for The Sons of Great Bear was conducted in summer 1965, and took place in the Socialist Republic of Montenegro and in the Elbe Sandstone Mountains. It took about two and half months, and the sum expended on making the picture was "over 2 million East German Marks".

== Reception ==
=== Distribution ===
The Sons of Great Bear turned into an instant success upon its release, owing also to two external factors: the first was its appeal to young audiences, as many East German children were already acquainted with Henrich's books; and another was the low supply of new pictures for 1966: over half of DEFA's productions intended to be released during the year – 12 out of 21, most prominently Kurt Maetzig's The Rabbit Is Me and Frank Beyer's Trace of Stones – were banned as a result of the XI Plenum of the Socialist Unity Party of Germany which took place between the 16th and 18 December 1965, in which the allegations of rising Politburo member Erich Honecker, who blamed the cinema industry for promoting values incongruous with Marxism, were widely accepted by state functionaries. Mach's film was one of those deemed innocuous enough to remain unscathed by censures.

The film quickly crossed the one million viewers threshold, "that magical number in DEFA terms" which signaled resounding commercial success, and by the end of the year attracted about five million people to cinemas, garnering 4.8 million East German Mark in revenues and turning to the highest-grossing picture of the year. In total, it sold 9,442,395 in the German Democratic Republic. It also became an export success, and was soon distributed in the Federal Republic of Germany – an uncommon achievement for a DEFA picture in the days prior to Chancellor Willy Brandt's rapprochement with the East German government. In the Czechoslovak Socialist Republic, it was seen by 1,737,900 viewers during its original run there in summer 1966. In the Soviet Union, where it was released in January the following year, it had 29.1 million admissions, making it to the top ten in the 1967 box office. It became popular throughout the Eastern Bloc. Walter Ulbricht requested a private screening "to understand why everyone was going to cinemas", and after the film ended he told the studio representative to "keep it up!" (weiter so!)

=== Critical response ===
The film critic of the East German Christian Democratic Union's newspaper Neue Zeit noted: "Most of the Indian novels, and therefore most Indian films, have cliché plots and characters, that have little to do with the reality of the struggle between the Whites and the natives in the late 19th Century. The romantic adventurism of the Wild West became a goal in itself... And reduced to a world of fiction, distanced from all historical truth." It was therefore "a notable feat for itself" when the film "released the topic from the chains of the cliché back to reality. There are also action and adventure here, but bound together with an exact portrayal of the tragic demise of a brave people." The Der Spiegel reviewer added: "under the pro-Indian direction of Josef Mach, the first Western of the German Democratic Republic is a shoot 'em up (Knall und-Fall) picture inlaid with a message: the athletic Red men shoot the Whites down from the saddle, and then stand between the tents, unemployed; the palefaces, on the contrary, drink and gamble in some fort."

=== Analysis ===
Dartmouth College Professor Gerd Gemünden believed the film's popularity in the German Democratic Republic, and that of its sequels, could be attributed to the manner in which both the personal biography of Mitić and the characteristics of his screen personae resonated with both the audience and the establishment. First, the actor was the son of Živojin Mitić, an officer of Marshal Josip Broz Tito's Yugoslav National Liberation Army who fought the Germans in World War II, thus fitting in with the GDR' state-espoused anti-fascism, which was central part of national identity. The Native Americans he portrayed, like Tokei-ihto, were members of an oppressed minority "refusing to be a passive victim to genocide", thus offering a "fantasy of a resistance fighter" to the audience, especially as he was seen to organize an Old West parallel of partisan warfare; the obvious capitalistic traits of the antagonists and the fact they were American comfortably embedded the picture's narrative into the Cold War discourse. Another factor was Mitić's character's ideally German behavior: with his athleticism, serenity, leadership and express anti-alcoholism – he was often seen to spill "firewater" offered to him, a characteristic shared also by Karl May's heroes – he symbolized a "particularly Teutonic form of model citizen". In addition to all this, while he already worked with Western filmmakers, he chose to emigrate to East Berlin – a welcome contrast to the constant flow of local actors defecting to the Federal Republic.

David T. McNab and Ute Lischke stressed that while purporting to present an authentic depiction of Native Americans, it also delivered orthodox East German political messages: the film's ending, in which Tokei-ihto declares his people will settle on the "rich fertile land" to "raise tame buffalo, forge iron, make ploughs" champions "no 'Indian' philosophy" but sounds more like "a new way for a worker and collective farming state". The use of religion, in the form of the bear cub saved from the cave, is an "improbable narrative... The spirit world is not understood but interpreted for the propaganda of the former East. Once again, the film exploits the 'Indians'."

=== Legacy ===
The favorable reception of The Sons of Great Bear surpassed by far what DEFA directors had anticipated, and paved the way for the making of some dozen sequels from the same genre of Indianerfilme, which for the large part also starred Mitić and became the studio's best known and most successful film series. Released for virtually every summer until the 1980s, they included such pictures as Chingachgook, die große Schlange, Spur des Falken, Weiße Wölfe, Tödlicher Irrtum, Osceola, Tecumseh, Ulzana, Kit & Co, Blutsbrüder, Severino and Der Scout. They also featured the basic theme of The Sons of Great Bear, setting the just Native Americans against the corrupt U.S. government and settlers. Mitić's films gained cult a following in East Germany, and also in the Soviet Union and the Eastern Bloc in general. They still enjoy a certain popularity in the new states of Germany, and a new wave of interest in them was rekindled with the resurgence of East German cultural nostalgia.

== Bibliography ==
- Van Alst; Theodore C. (2008). "How Quickly They Forget": American Indians in European Film, 1962-1976. University of Connecticut Press. ISBN 978-0-549-87971-8.
- Bergfelder, Tim (2005). International Adventures: German Popular Cinema and European Co-Productions in the 1960s. Berghahn Books. ISBN 978-1-57181-538-5.
- McNab, David; Lischke, Ute (2005). Walking A Tightrope: Aboriginal People And Their Representations. Wilfrid Laurier University Press. ISBN 978-0-88920-460-7.
- Gemünden, Gerd (2002). Germans and Indians: Fantasies, Encounters, Projections. University of Nebraska Press. ISBN 978-0-8032-6420-5.
- Habel, Frank-Burkhard (1997). Gojko Mitić, Mustangs, Marterpfähle: die DEFA-Indianerfilme - das grosse Buch für Fans. Schwarzkopf & Schwarzkopf. ISBN 978-3-89602-120-5.
- Razzakov, Fedor (2005). Naše Ljubimoe Kino... o Vojne. Algoritm. ISBN 978-5-699-12882-2.
- Berghahn, Daniela (2005). Hollywood Behind the Wall: The Cinema of East Germany. Manchester University Press. ISBN 978-0-7190-6172-1.
- Nordhausen, Frank; Garve, Roland (2007). Kirahé - der weiße Fremde: Unterwegs zu den letzten Naturvölkern. Links. ISBN 978-3-86153-425-9.
- Leonhard, Joachim-Felix, ed. (2002). Medienwissenschaft: Ein Handbuch Zur Entwicklung Der Medien Und Kommunikationsform (Band 15.2). Mouton De Gruyter. ISBN 978-3-11-016326-1.
- König (1996). Zwischen Marx und Muck : DEFA-Filme für Kinder. Henschel. ISBN 978-3-89487-234-2.
- Heermann, Christian (1995). Old Shatterhand ritt nicht im Auftrag der Arbeiterklasse: warum war Karl May in SBZ und DDR "verboten". Anhaltische Verlagsgesellschaft. ISBN 978-3-910192-32-4.
- Grieb, Margit; Lehman, Will (2010). Cultural Perspectives on Film, Literature, and Language. Universal-Publishers. ISBN 978-1-59942-548-1.
- Werner-Burgmann, Anett (2025). "Mehr als rote Farbe. Die Söhne der großen Bärin (Josef Mach, 1965) aus diskriminierungskritischer Perspektive". Leuchtkraft 2025. Journal der DEFA-Stiftung (in German) (8). Berlin: DEFA-Stiftung. ISSN 2940-2891.
- Muller, Elsa Christina (1995). A Cultural Study of the Sioux Novels of Liselotte Welskopf-Henrich (PhD thesis). University of Maryland.
- Goral, Pawel (2014). Cold War Rivalry and the Perception of the American West. Basingstoke: Palgrave Macmillan. ISBN 978-1-349-47324-3.
- Lorenz, Erik (2021). Liselotte Welskopf-Henrich und die Indianer (in German). Chemnitz: Palisander Verlag. ISBN 978-3-957840-34-9.
