= Gottfried Kolditz =

German actor and director

- Born: 14 December 1922; Altenbach, Schriesheim, Germany
- Died: 15 June 1982 (aged 59); Dubrovnik, SFR Yugoslavia
- Occupations: Director and scriptwriter

Gottfried Kolditz (14 December 1922 – 15 June 1982) was a German film actor and director.

== Biography ==
Kolditz was born in Altenbach, Schriesheim, Germany, on 14 December 1922. His family were farmers. Between 1945 and 1949 he studied German philology at the University of Leipzig, and took a course of direction and acting in 1947–1949 at the Leipzig Higher School of Music and Drama. In the early 1950s he worked as an actor and director at various theaters in East Germany.

After 1955 he worked at DEFA, the East German film studio, in a wide range of genres: fairy tales ("Ms. Blizzard," from the story of the same name by the Brothers Grimm), adventure films, musicals, and science fiction ("Signals" and "In the Dust of Stars" on themes similar to 2001: A Space Odyssey). He wrote scripts both for himself and for other directors. He was widely acclaimed for his Red Westerns with actor Gojko Mitić: "Next Falcon", "Apache" and "Ulzana."

He died on 15 June 1982 in Dubrovnik, Yugoslavia, while location scouting for the film Der Scout. ]

== Selected filmography as director ==
- Das Stacheltier (1956-1961) (Translation: Porcupine) (series, shorts)
- Mit Oswald in der Oper (1956) (Translation: With Oswald at the Opera)
- Von nun ab, Herr Kunze (1956)
- Tanz in der Galerie (1957)
- Der junge Engländer (1958)
- Simplon-Tunnel (1959)
- Weißes Blut (1959)
- Die schöne Lurette (1960)
- Die goldene Jurte (1961)
- Snow White (1961)
- Midnight Revue (1962)
- Frau Holle (1963)
- Geliebte weiße Maus (1964)
- Das Tal der sieben Monde (1966)
- Spur des Falken (1968)
- Signale – Ein Weltraumabenteuer (1970)
- Apachen (1973)
- Ulzana (1974)
- In the Dust of the Stars (1976)
- Das Ding im Schloß (1979)

== Personal life ==
His son, Stefan Kolditz (born 1956), is a novelist and playwright.
