= Karl-Ernst Sasse =

German composer (1923–2006)

Karl-Ernst Sasse (December 5, 1923 – November 12, 2006) was a German composer and conductor. He was considered one of the most important film composers in East Germany. His life's work as a composer includes much stage music, and more than 500 film soundtracks for various DEFA films. In the 1960s and 1970s he composed the music for several DEFA Indian films and silent film classics that made him famous. From 1959 to 1964 he was chief conductor of the DEFA Symphony Orchestra Potsdam-Babelsberg and from 1964 to 1967 of the Philharmonisches Staatsorchester Halle.

== Early life and education ==
Karl-Ernst Sasse was born in Bremen in 1923 as the son of the music educator and conductor Ernst Sasse and his wife Herta, a chemical assistant. Even as a child he received massive artistic support from his parents. At the age of seven he received private lessons and learned to play various musical instruments such as piano, flute, viola and saxophone at an early age. At the age of ten he composed his own pieces for the first time and was self-taught with music theory. He started his school career in Bückeburg, Lower Saxony, where he attended the Gymnasium Adolphinum from 1934 to 1936. He then moved to the Athenaeum Stade high school for four years and then to Sondershausen, where he graduated from high school in 1942. In April 1942 he was drafted into the Wehrmacht as a soldier and transferred to the Luftwaffe, where he first played in a music corps in Nordhausen and later an orchestra at the pilot school in Silesia founded.

== Career ==
After End of the War, he studied conducting, composition, piano, viola and singing at the Sondershausen Conservatory from October 1, 1945. Parallel to his studies, Sasse worked as an accompanist and opera conductor at the Landestheater Sondershausen. In 1948 he became first opera conductor and in 1950 musical director. This was followed by his work as solo répétiteur and Concertmaster at the Meiningen Court Theatre (1948–1951). Furthermore, as municipal music director (1951–1956) he built the municipal orchestra in Wernigerode, and subsequently conducted various symphony and spa concerts. As Kapellmeister and second conductor under Horst Förster, he moved to the Philharmonisches Staatsorchester Halle (1956–1958).

On January 1, 1959, Sasse took over the management of the DEFA Symphony Orchestra Potsdam-Babelsberg and over the course of his career scored a large number of films for the DEFA studios and for GDR television (Deutscher Fernsehfunk or 'DFF'). Initially, he only supervised the recording of the compositions, but later he also created his own pieces for a variety of film genres.

=== Work ===
The television film Monologue for a Taxi Driver by Günter Kunert and Günter Stahnke, for which he wrote his first music in 1962, was banned and only performed in 1990. His first feature film was The Secret of 17, a children's film from 1963. A year later he made his feature film debut with the music for Alaska Foxes. From 1967 Sasse worked freelance and became DEFA's busiest composer, creating around 550 film soundtracks until the East German film production company was dissolved.

In the 1960s and 1970s he composed the music for several DEFA Indian films with Gojko Mitić in the lead role (Spur des Falken, White Wolves, Ulzana, Blood Brothers and The Scout). From the 1970s to the 1990s he wrote new music for reconstructed silent films, among others: The Golem: How He Came into the World and The Last Man, the latter commissioned by the Friedrich Wilhelm Murnau Society. He also composed the music for the film The Einstein of Sex (1999) by Rosa von Praunheim.

== Awards ==
- 1980: Theodor-Fontane-Preis für Kunst und Literatur (Bezirk Potsdam) [de:Theodor-Fontane-Preis für Kunst und Literatur (Bezirk Potsdam)]
- 1986: National Prize of the German Democratic Republic II. Klasse für Kunst und Literatur im Kollektiv von Künstlern des Fernsehfilms (Second Class prize for art and literature in the collective of television film artists) Ernst Thälmann („für die hervorragenden filmspezifischen Leistungen im Fernsehfilm ‚Ernst Thälmann‘, durch die ein bewegendes politisches und künstlerisches Erlebnis vermittelt wurde“ - "for the excellent film-specific achievements in the television film 'Ernst Thälmann', which conveyed a moving political and artistic experience")

== Bibliography ==
- Gabriele Baumgartner: Reuter, Rolf. In: Gabriele Baumgartner, Dieter Hebig (Ed.): Biographisches Handbuch der SBZ/DDR. 1945–1990. Band 2: Maaßen–Zylla. Nachtrag zu Band 1, K. G. Saur, München 1997, ISBN 3-598-11177-0, p. 755.
- Hans-Michael Bock: Karl-Ernst Sasse. In: Ders. (Ed.): CineGraph – Lexikon zum deutschsprachigen Film - Kompakt-Lexikon zum deutschsprachigen Film. Edition Text & Kritik, München 1984.
- Vera Grützner: Musiker in Brandenburg vom 16. Jahrhundert bis zur Gegenwart. Jaron, Berlin 2004, ISBN 3-89773-507-5, p. 220.
- Wolfgang Klaue, Christiane Mückenberger (Ed.): Film A–Z. Regisseure, Kameraleute, Autoren, Komponisten, Szenographen, Sachbegriffe. Henschel, Berlin 1984.
- Karl-Ernst Sasse – „Ich bin sozusagen ein Bestellkomponist“, Interview mit Mike Beilfuß, in: Cinema Musica. Ausgabe 5/Juli 2006, p. 22–29

Cultural offices
Preceded by Horst Förster	Music Director, Staatsorchester Halle; 1964–1967	Succeeded by Olaf Koch
