= Ernst Thälmann (TV series) =

- Genre: Biopic
- Screenplay by: Otto Bonhoff; Georg Schiemann; Erich Selbmann
- Directed by: Ursula Bonhoff; Georg Schiemann
- Starring: Helmut Schellhardt; Christine Schorn; Günther Grabbert; Peter Sodann
- Music by: Karl-Ernst Sasse
- Country of origin: East Germany
- Original language: German
- No. of episodes: 2

Production
- Running time: 4 hours
- Production company: DEFA-Studio für Spielfilme

Original release
- Network: Deutscher Fernsehfunk
- Release: 7 February 1986

Ernst Thälmann is a two-part television miniseries by DEFA. It was first broadcast on 7 February 1986 on GDR television, DFF. It is on the life of German Communist leader, Ernst Thälmann (who during the Weimar Republic was the head of the ticket for the Communist Party of Germany, and was executed on Adolf Hitler's order, 1944).

== Plot and production ==
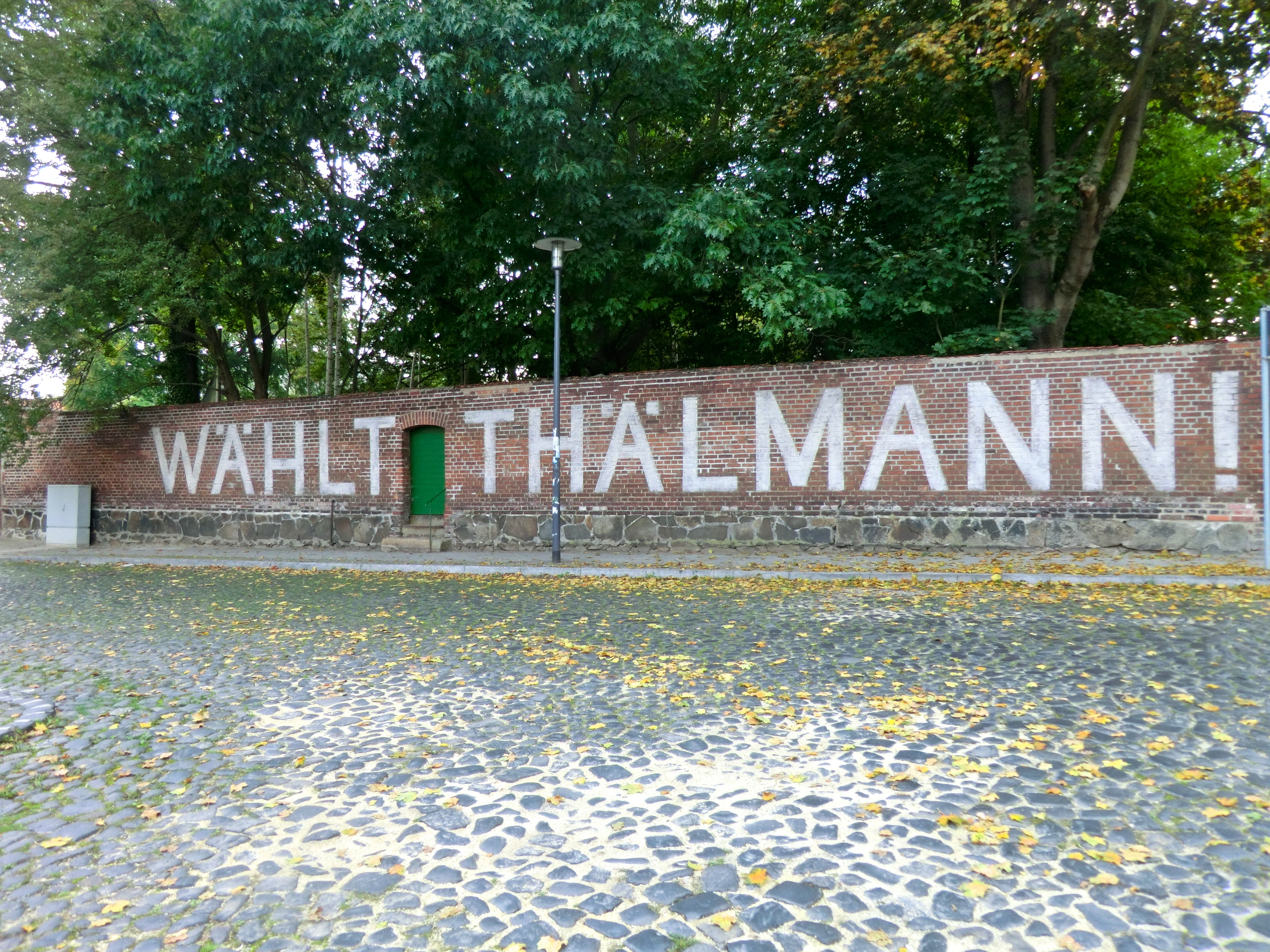
Lettering from the Ernst-Thälmann TV film; still remaining at filming location, Görlitz, Bergstraße

The story spans 1 May 1929, the Blutmai, on which police shot at demonstrating Berlin workers, to 7 February 1933, the day on which the meeting of the Central Committee of the party took place in Sporthaus Ziegenhals, where Thälmann appeared as a speaker for the last time. Filming began in 1984 and took place in Görlitz and Wuppertal.

== Cast ==
- Helmut Schellhardt: Ernst Thälmann
- Christine Schorn: Rosa Thälmann
- Günther Grabbert: Wilhelm Pieck
- Peter Sodann: John Schehr
- Marian Kociniak: Marcel Cachin
- Hartmut Beer: Maurice Thorez
- Maxi Biewer: nurse
- Jürgen Reuter: Adolf Hitler
- Hans-Joachim Hegewald: Hermann Göring
- Arno Wyzniewski: Joseph Goebbels

== Reception ==
The film received numerous awards from the East German authorities. Helmut Schellhardt received the First Class prize, "for his outstanding achievements as an actor, especially for his portrayal of Ernst Thälmann", for the National Prize of East Germany in 1986. The following cast members also received the First Class prize for the National Prize in 1986: Otto Bonhoff, Ursula Bonhoff, Hans-Jürgen Faschina, Georg Schiemann, Erich Seibmann. Other cast and production members, including film composer Karl-Ernst Sasse, won Second Class prizes for their contributions.

Recent reception has been more critical:

Historically inaccurate, incomplete and already anachronistic heroic epic at the time of its creation, which was treated by the SED party leadership as a main and state action.

— --Lexicon of international film
