= Ilse Voigt =

Ilse Voigt may refer to:

- Ilse Voigt (film editor)
- Ilse Voigt (actress)
