= In the Dust of the Stars =

- Original film poster reflecting the movie's original title
- Directed by: Gottfried Kolditz
- Written by: Gottfried Kolditz
- Cinematography: Peter Süring
- Edited by: Christa Helwig
- Music by: Karl-Ernst Sasse
- Release date: 1976
- Running time: 95 minutes
- Country: East Germany
- Language: German

In the Dust of the Stars (German: Im Staub der Sterne, Romanian: Revoltă în cosmos) is a 1976 East German science fiction film, co-produced with Romania and directed by Gottfried Kolditz. Some of the film's props were part of a 2009 exhibit entitled "Retrospektive in die Zukunft" and Twitch Film screened the film as part of their Attack The Bloc screening series.

== Synopsis ==
The spaceship Cynro has received a distress call from the planet TEM 4. The crew tries to respond but ends up crash landing on the planet as a result of radio waves. Emerging from the ship, the crew is brought to the planet's leader Ronk (Milan Beli), who tells the Cynro crew that there was never any accident and that the distress call was all a mistake. As an apology he invites the crew to a party, much to the misgivings of Suko (Alfred Struwe), the ship's navigator. Sensing that there is more to Ronk's claims, Suko refuses the invitation.

His concerns end up being well-founded after Ronk uses the party to remove any memories of the fake distress call and Suko discovers a subterranean mine where Ronk forces captives to work as slaves. The Cynro crew is unable to decide whether they should return to their ship and escape or stay and help the slaves gain freedom. This choice is ultimately made for them when the slaves revolt and the ensuing battle forces the crew to leave the planet, leaving behind their commander and Suko, who is dying. The film ends with the natives burying Suko.

== Cast ==
- Jana Brejchová: Akala
- Alfred Struwe: Suko
- Ekkehard Schall: Chief
- Milan Beli: Ronk
- Silvia Popovici: Illik
- Violeta Andrei: Rall
- Leon Niemczyk: Thob
- Regine Heintze: Miu
- Mihai Mereuță: Kte
- Ștefan Mihăilescu-Brăila: Xik

== Editions ==
The original, uncut version of the film was rereleased by the DEFA Film Library at the University of Massachusetts Amherst in 2005.

== Reception ==
DVD Verdict gave the film a positive review, calling it a "guilty pleasure" and a "fun, cheesy movie". DVD Talk also praised the film and wrote "Though it's easy to mock its very '70s art direction, costume design and general sensibility, In the Dust of the Stars (Im Staub der Sterne, 1975) exhibits much imagination throughout."

== Bibliography ==
- Berghahn, Daniela (2005), Hollywood Behind the Wall: The Cinema of East Germany, Manchester University Press, p. 41, ISBN 0719061717
- Brockmann, Stephen (2010), A Critical History of German Film (Studies in German Literature Linguistics and Culture), Camden Press, p. 230, ISBN 978-1571134684
- Hake, Sabine (2007), German National Cinema (National Cinemas), Routledge, p. 137, ISBN 978-0415420983
- Scalzi, John (2005), The Rough Guide to Sci-Fi Movies, Rough Guides, p. 257, ISBN 1843535203
