= Ludvík Podéšť =

Czech composer and conductor (1921–1968)

Ludvík Podéšť, pseudonym Ludvík Binovský (19 December 1921 – 27 February 1968), was a Czech composer, conductor, music journalist and editor.

== Life and career ==
Podéšť was born on 19 December 1921 in Dubňany. He studied music composition at Brno Conservatory under Jaroslav Kvapil from 1941, graduating in 1948. He became a music reporter for the Czech Radio studio in Brno while studying musicology at Masaryk University under Bohumír Štědroň and Jan Racek. In Brno, he also worked as director of the Radost Youth Choir, for whom he wrote a large number of choral works. For the years 1953–1956, Podéšť replaced Radim Drejsl (1923–1953) as director of the Vít Nejedlý Army Artistic Ensemble (Armádní umělecký soubor Víta Nejedlého) in Prague, then during 1958–1961, he worked as an editor of music broadcasts for Czechoslovak Television. After 1961 he devoted himself exclusively to composition, only occasionally working as a freelancer. From 1966 until his death, Podéšť lived in Morocco with his wife, who was a doctor.

Podéšť composed two operas, five operettas, music for Czech feature films, orchestral music, vocal and chamber works. His first classical works were influenced by constructivism (such as the String Quartet No. 1, the piano fantasies Písně smutné paní, the Woodwind Quintet and Cello Sonata), but later found inspiration in folklore and in the work of the Moravian composer Leoš Janáček (for example the symphonic poem Raymonda Dienová, the orchestral rhapsody Advent and Maminka for children's chorus and orchestra). With the works created during his years in Morocco, Podéšť utilized elements of the local music culture and began to modernize his musical language (for example Hamada for orchestra and the Partita for strings, guitar and percussion).

His composing style contains contradictory elements; he composed classical music as well as popular songs promoting optimistic visions of the Czechoslovak communist régime. Following the suicide of Radim Drejsl he became one of the most important Czech composers of the politically engaged songs called "budovatelské písně". Podéšť composed a number of songs within the genre of popular music and "trampská hudba". His songs are catchy, especially noted for their pleasing melodies and jolly optimism.

Podéšť is the author of several professional journal studies such as Za odkazem V. Nejedlého (Vít Nejedlý Legacy; Hudební rozhledy, Vol. 8, 1955), Harmonická práce L. Janáčka (The Harmonic Work of Leoš Janáček; Hudební rozhledy, Vol. 10, 1957) and Hovoříme o hudbě (Talking about Music; Blok, Vol. 3, p. 302).

Podéšť died on 27 February 1968 in Prague.

== Selected works ==
Stage

- Když se Anička vdávala (When Anička Married), Operetta (1950); libretto by Pantůček and Jiří Štuchal
- Slepice a kostelník, Operetta (1951); libretto by Jaroslav Zrotal and Pantůček
- Bez cymbálu nejsou hody, Operetta (1953); libretto by Michal Sedloň
- Tři apokryfy, 3 One-Act Chamber Operas after stories from Apocryphal Tales by Karel Čapek (1957–1958); libretto by the composer

1. Staré zlaté časy, t. pod názvem O úpadku doby (The Good Old Days)
2. Svatá noc (Holy Night)
3. Romeo a Julie (Romeo and Juliet)

- Hrátky s čertem (Playing with the Devil), Comic Opera in 7 scenes (1957–1960); libretto by the composer after the play by Jan Drda
- Emílek a dynamit, Operetta (1960); libretto by Vilém Dubský and Josef Barchánek
- Filmová hvězda (Film-Star), Operetta (1960); libretto by K. M. Walló
- Noci na seně (A Night on the Hay), Operetta in 3 acts; libretto by Zdeněk Endris and Zdeněk Borovec

Orchestral

- Symfonie (1947–1948)
- Fašaňk, Suite for orchestra (1951)
- Raymonda Dienová, Symphonic Poem (1950, revised 1952)
- Dva moravské tance (2 Moravian Dances) for orchestra (1953)

1. Odzemek
2. Cigáň

- Čínské jaro (Chinese Spring), Suite from the film for orchestra (1954)
- Advent, Rhapsody on themes from the film score after Jarmila Glazarová for large orchestra (1956)
- Suite for orchestra (1956)
- Siciliana, Variations for orchestra (1957)
- Azurové moře for orchestra (1967)
- Hamada, Study in Monotony for orchestra (1967)
- Partita pro smyčce, kytaru a bicí for electric guitar, percussion (4 players) and string orchestra (1967)

Concertante

- Hudba ve starém slohu (Music in Old Style) for piano and string orchestra (1949)
- Concerto No. 1 for piano and orchestra (1952, revised 1953)
- Concerto "Jarní serenáda" (Spring Serenade) for violin and orchestra (1953)
- Concerto No. 2 for piano and orchestra (1958–1959)
- Concertino for 2 cimbaloms and orchestra (1962)
- Concertino for 2 cellos and chamber orchestra (1965)
- Valčíkové variace (Waltz Variations) for trumpet and orchestra (1965)

Chamber music

- String Quartet No. 1 (1942)
- Litanie, String Quartet in 1 movement (1944)
- Hojačky for 2 clarinets and piano (1945)
- Woodwind Quintet (1946)
- Sonata for violin and piano (1947)
- Pět jarních dní (Five Spring Days), String Quartet No. 2 (1948)
- Suite for viola and piano (1956)
- Sonata for 2 cellos and piano (1957)
- Tři skladby (3 Pieces) for violin and piano (1958)

Piano

- Písně smutné paní, 4 Fantasies (1941)
- Sonatina (1945)
- Stesky, Cycle of Miniatures (1946)
- Suite (1946)
- Sonata (1946)

Vocal

- Gitandžalí for low voice and piano (1942); words by I. Hubíková (1942)
- Písně na slova Olgy Scheinpflugové (Songs on Words of Olga Scheinpflugová) for alto and piano (1943)
- Maminčiny písně for soprano and piano (1943); words by Jaroslav Seifert
- Popěvky o vojácích for soprano, tenor and orchestra (1945); words by the composer
- Písně a popěvky for medium voice and chamber ensemble (1946); words by Vítězslav Nezval (1946)
- Písně z koncentráku for baritone and orchestra (1946); words by Josef Čapek
- Legendy o panně Marii (Legends of the Virgin Mary) for alto (1947)
- Měsíce (The Moon), Song Cycle on Poems of Karel Toman for soprano and orchestra (1948, revised 1957–1958)
- Květomluva for child soloist and chamber ensemble (1948)
- Každodenní malé písně for medium voice and piano (1948); words by the composer
- Tiše for voice and piano (1948–1949); words by František Halas
- Moja rodná for tenor and orchestra (1949); words by Ján Kostra
- Domů jedu domovinou svou for tenor and orchestra (1954); words by Oldřich Mikulášek; won first prize in the 1955 Great Jubilee Competition of the Czech Composers Union (Velká jubilejní soutěž Svazu českých skladatelů)
- Maminka (The Mummy), Song for medium voice and piano (1954); words by Jaroslav Seifert
- Písně na staré motivy (Songs on Ancient Themes) for baritone (or alto) and chamber orchestra (1955–1956)
- Divoký chmel, 4 Songs for baritone and piano (1960); words by Ivan Skála
- Každodenní malé písně, Song Cycle for high voice and piano (1967–1968)
- Tesknice for low voice, flute, viola, cello and piano; words by František Halas

Choral

- Smrt (Death), Cantata (1942); words by Olga Scheinpflugová
- Píseň o rodné zemi for male chorus (1946); words by Jaroslav Seifert
- Píseň o Stalinu, Cantata (1950); words by Stanislav Kostka Neumann
- Píseň o veliké době, Cantata (1950–1951); words by Ivan Skála
- Láska za lásku for mixed chorus and orchestra (1951)
- Veselé město, Suite for mixed chorus and large variety band (1952–1953)
- Láska pěknější, Cantata for soprano, alto, tenor, bass, female chorus and piano (1954–1955); words by Josef Kainar; won the Josef Bohuslav Foerster Prize, second prize in the 1955 Great Jubilee Competition of the Czech Composers Union (Velká jubilejní soutěž Svazu českých skladatelů)
- Praha (Prague) for male chorus (1955)
- Maminka, Song for children's chorus and orchestra (1963); words by Jaroslav Seifert
- Nadešel čas for unison chorus and piano; words by Stanislav Kostka Neumann
- Šťastnou cestu for soloist, chorus and orchestra
- Vojáček modrooký for soprano, male chorus and chamber orchestra with cimbalom
- Všední den for unison chorus; words by T. Pantůček
- Všichni jsme mladí for mixed chorus and orchestra

Film scores

Year	Czech title (original title)	English title	Notes
1950	Všední den		
1952	Písnička za groš	A Song for a Penny	directed by Rudolf Myzet
1952	Zítra se bude tančit všude	Tomorrow, People Will Be Dancing Everywhere	directed by Vladimír Vlček; constructivist film
1955	Čínské jaro	Chinese Spring	documentary
1956	Rudá záře nad Kladnem	Red Glare over Kladno	directed by Vladimír Vlček
1956	Zaostřit, prosím!	Focus, Please!	a.k.a. Close Up, Please!; directed by Martin Frič
1956	Advent	Advent	directed by Vladimír Vlček
1957	Florenc 13:30		directed by Josef Mach includes the song "Šoférská" sung by Josef Bek
1958	Hořká láska	Bitter Love	directed by Josef Mach
1958	La liberté surveillée	Provisional Liberty	Czech language title: V proudech; directed by Henri Aisner and Vladimír Vlček
1959	Zatoulané dělo	The Lost Gun	a.k.a. The Missing Cannon; directed by Josef Mach
1960	Pán a hvezdár	The Master and the Astronomer	directed by Dušan Kodaj
1961	Florián		directed by Josef Mach
1961	Valčík pro milión	Waltz for a Million	directed by Josef Mach includes the song "Babičko, nauč mně charleston" (Grandmother, Teach Me the Charleston)
1962	Prosím, nebudit!		directed by Josef Mach
1962	Medailonograf Frantiska Filipovského		documentary short; directed by Josef Mach
1963	Tři chlapi v chalupě		directed by Josef Mach
1968	Objížďka		directed by Josef Mach
