= Swelling Melodies =

1955 film

- Directed by: E.W. Fiedler
- Written by: E.W. Fiedler; Richard Genée (libretto Die Fledermaus); Karl Haffner (libretto Die Fledermaus); Henri Meilhac (play Le Réveillon); Ludovic Halévy (play Le Réveillon)
- Starring: Erich Arnold; Jarmila Ksírová; Sonja Schöner
- Cinematography: E.W. Fiedler
- Edited by: DEFA
- Music by: Johann Strauss (operetta)
- Distributed by: VEB Progress Film
- Release date: 20 May 1955
- Running time: 82 minutes
- Country: East Germany
- Language: German

Swelling Melodies (German: Rauschende Melodien) is a 1955 East German musical film directed by E.W. Fiedler and starring Erich Arnold, Jarmila Ksírová and Sonja Schöner. It is an adaptation of the operetta Die Fledermaus by Johann Strauss II and Richard Genée and was part of a tradition of operetta films in German cinema.. It was released in 1955, and sold 4,968,582 tickets.

It was made by the state-backed DEFA studios. The film's sets were designed by Artur Günther.

== Cast ==
- Erich Arnold as Gabriel von Eisenstein
- Jarmila Ksírová as Rosalinde von Eisenstein
- Sonja Schöner as Adele
- Herbert Kiper as Dr. Falke
- Gerd Frickhöffer as Prinz Orlofsky
- Rolf Weih as Alfred
- Hans Wocke as Gefängnisdirektor Frank
- Joseph Egger as Gefängniswärter Frosch
- Elvira Sternbeck as Ida
- Hans Klering as Dr. Blind
- Hans Alexander as Gefangener
- Günter Beurenmeister as Verehrer
- Kurt Bobeth-Bolander as Bersitz
- Ursula Dücker as Dame
- Christine Fischer as Dame
- Walter Grimm as Herr
- Ernst Paul Hempel as Briefträger
- Hella Jansen as Dame
- Günter Klostermann as Offizier
- Gerhard Lau as Diener
- Anna Lindemann as Dame
- Herbert Mewes-Conti as Verehrer
- Walter Salow as Diener
- Nico Turoff as Diener
- Ernst Ullrich as Gefangener
- Inka Unverzagt as Dame
- Teddy Wulff as Verehrer

== Bibliography ==
- Liehm, Mira & Liehm, Antonín J. The Most Important Art: Eastern European Film After 1945. University of California Press, 1977.
