= Unverzagt =

Unverzagt is a surname. Notable people with the surname include:

- Eric Unverzagt (born 1972), American football player
- Inka Unverzagt (1924–2016), German ballerina
- Wilhelm Unverzagt (1892–1971), German prehistorian and archaeologist
