= Alfred Struwe =

German actor

Alfred Struwe (April 22, 1927 – February 13, 1998) was a German actor, best known for his television role as Dr. Alexander Wittkugel in Zahn um Zahn.

Struwe was born in Marienburg, West Prussia (today Malbork in Poland), the son of a postman, and grew up there with five siblings. His first acting experience was in Hitler Youth summer camps. In 1944 he was called up first into the Reich Labour Service, then into the military. After attending officer training school in Hanover, he was sent along with other young contemporaries into battle in the final days of World War II. In 1945 he rejoined his family in Leipzig. Since his father, Gustav, was opposed to his making acting his career, he instead had to attend a police academy, until in 1948 it closed and he was also discharged. From then on, he was able to dedicate himself entirely to acting. He had already performed part-time in amateur productions and taken private acting lessons during his police training. In 1949 he joined the theater company in Greiz and subsequently was engaged in Brandenburg, Zittau, Cottbus, Karl-Marx-Stadt and Dresden.

Struwe made his first appearance before the cameras in 1954, in the DEFA co-production Leuchtfeuer. Then beginning in the 1960s, his face was often seen on both movie and television screens. Several times he played the part of the would-be assassin of Hitler, Claus Schenk Graf von Stauffenberg. In 1985 he played what would become his signature role, the eccentric dentist Dr. Alexander Wittkugel in the television series Zahn um Zahn ("A Tooth for a Tooth"). This was so successful that in response to viewer demand the 7 projected episodes were extended and in the end 21 stories of "Dr. Wittkugel's Practices" were produced.

Struwe's daughter Catharina Struwe is likewise an actress, with, for example, a longstanding engagement at the Neue Bühne in Senftenberg.

With the dissolution of the Iron Curtain, the popular actor's life became quieter. Struwe made occasional further appearances on stage and on television, but otherwise enjoyed his retirement. He died in Potsdam in 1998 after a lengthy illness caused by pneumonia and was buried in the Southwest Cemetery in Stahnsdorf.

== Selected filmography ==
- 1954: Leuchtfeuer - Junger Fischer
- 1963: Geheimarchiv an der Elbe - Adjutant von Upitz
- 1963: Vanina Vanini (TV Movie) - Fürst Savelli
- 1966: Ohne Kampf kein Sieg (TV Mini-Series) - Claus von Stauffenberg
- 1968: Die Toten bleiben jung - von Klemm
- 1969: Krupp und Krause (TV Series) - Alfried Krupp
- 1969: Verdacht auf einen Toten - Scheitler
- 1971: KLK Calling PTZ - The Red Orchestra - Bellini
- 1971: Liberation III: Direction of the Main Blow - Stauffenberg
- 1971: Istanbul-Masche (TV Movie) - Alfred Gärtner
- 1972: Die Bilder des Zeugen Schattmann (TV Mini-Series) - Fritz Marcus
- 1973: Die Hosen des Ritters Bredow - Hauptmann Otterstädt
- 1973-1979: Das unsichtbare Visier (TV Series) - General Gert von Wieseneck
- 1974: Wolz - Leben und Verklärung eines deutschen Anarchisten - Zweiter Polizist
- 1974: Ulzana - Aldrigton, Bürgermeister von Tucson
- 1975: Fischzüge (TV Movie) - Nienhusen
- 1976: Im Staub der Sterne - Suko
- 1976-1989: Polizeiruf 110 (TV Series) - Uwe Kellerbauer / Dr. Frowein / Friedrich Bader
- 1977: Osvobození Prahy - von Matzmer
- 1978: Anton the Magician - Bankmensch
- 1978: Zwei Betten in der Hohen Tatra - Wolfgang Witt
- 1979: Bis daß der Tod euch scheidet - Jens' Schwager
- 1980: Archiv des Todes (TV Series) - Standartenführer Hauk
- 1980: Oben geblieben ist noch keiner (TV Movie) - Flugplatzleiter Behrens
- 1980: Wizja lokalna 1901
- 1980: Jesli serce masz bijace
- 1981: Asta, mein Engelchen
- 1981: Der ungebetene Gast (TV Movie) - Felix Hollerbusch
- 1981: Berühmte Ärzte der Charité: Der kleine Doktor (TV Movie) - Geheimrat Dr. Lehnert
- 1982: Dein unbekannter Bruder - Staatsrat Diestelkamp
- 1982: Der lange Ritt zur Schule - Erster Guter
- 1983: Frühstück im Bett (TV Movie) - Georg Hartmann
- 1983: Die lieben Luder (TV Movie, Sequel to Polizeiruf 110) - Herr Zander
- 1983: Verzeihung, sehen Sie Fußball? - Dr. Kobermann
- 1983: Automärchen - Sauerboom
- 1984: Mensch, Oma! (TV Mini-Series) - Redner
- 1984: Front ohne Gnade (TV Series) - Obersturmbannführer Maas
- 1984-1990: Schauspielereien: Gesucht und gefunden (TV Series)
- 1985-1988: Zahn um Zahn (TV Series) - Dr. Alexander Wittkugel
- 1987: Magnat - Wilhelm II, German Emperor
- 1987: Sachsens Glanz und Preußens Gloria: Gräfin Cosel (TV Movie) - Graf Jacob Heinrich von Flemming
- 1989: Die Besteigung des Chimborazo
- 1991: Aerolina (TV Series) - Zirkusdirektor Bernhard
- 1992: Karl May (TV Mini-Series) - Lawyer Bernstein
- 1997: Verdammtes Glück (TV Movie) - Herr Leipold (final film role)
