= Mit Oswald in der Oper =

1956 film

- Directed by: Gottfried Kolditz
- Release date: 1956
- Country: East Germany
- Language: German

Mit Oswald in der Oper is an East German (German Democratic Republic/GDR) black-and-white feature film. The translated title is With Oswald at the Opera. It was released by DEFA Studio for Feature Films in 1956. The screenplay for the film was written by the director, Gottfried Kolditz. The world premiere was on July 12, 1956. An alternative title is The Spiny Animal, Episode 083.

== Plot ==
Friend Werner picks up Oswald for a visit to the opera, who puts on a Nicki and doesn't want to tie a tie. Once there, he disturbs the audience and conductor during the performance with loud comments and paper crackling. Finally, he falls asleep and is only woken up by the final applause. The artistic director pays him "special recognition" for his improper behavior by shaking hands. Oswald disappears from the picture - it can only be a slander by the "prickly animal", in reality there are no such fellow human beings!
