= Husaren in Berlin =

- Directed by: Erwin Stranka
- Written by: Erwin Stranka (book); Christel Gräf (script editor)
- Starring: See below
- Cinematography: Otto Hanisch
- Edited by: Ilse Peters
- Music by: Wilhelm Neef
- Release date: 1971
- Running time: 92 minutes
- Country: East Germany
- Language: German

Husaren in Berlin is an East German film directed by Erwin Stranka and produced by DEFA. It is based during the Seven Years' war surrounding the Berlin Hussar raid. The film premiered on June 26, 1971 in Berlin.

== Plot summary ==
Set during the Seven Years' War in 1757, the film follows Augustin, an innkeeper from Brandenburg, who plans to marry his daughter Andrea to a prosperous Berlin merchant. While travelling to the city, they are captured by Hungarian hussars commanded by Marshal Andras Hadik. Andrea, who has little interest in the arranged marriage, falls in love with the young hussar trumpeter Pali.

The hussars advance on Berlin and successfully occupy the lightly defended city. As Prussian forces prepare to organize a defense, tensions gradually give way to friendship rather than armed conflict. Encouraged by the growing romance between Andrea and Pali, the hussars and Berlin's civilian population develop a spirit of camaraderie during the brief occupation.

The occupation lasts only one day before the approach of the main prussian army compels Hadik and his men to withdraw from the city, bringing the romance and the unusual encounter between occupiers and residents to a peaceful conclusion.

== Cast ==
- Manfred Krug as Andreas Hatik von Futak
- Evelyn Opoczynski as Andrea
- István Iglódi
- Rolf Herricht as Augustin
- Gábor Agárdi
- Antol Farkas
- Herwart Grosse as von Rochow
- Norbert Christian as Splitgerber
- Siegfried Weiß as Gotzkowsky
- Günter Rüger as Kowacz
- Günter Schubert as Toth
- Hans Klering as Wegelin
- Frantisek Velecký as Cziczery
- Holger Mahlich as Kalkstein
- Ivan Malré as Gesandter
- Lutz Jahoda as Dolfi
- Helmut Schreiber as Van Dessau
- Lajos Farkas as Lajos
- Ilse Voigt as Königsmutter
- Lilo Grahn as Frau Splitgerber
- Marianne Christina Schilling as Frau von Rochow
- Horst Kube as Oskar
- Agnes Kraus as Friedchen
- Peter Dommisch as Egon
- Axel Triebel as Adolar
- Friedrich Teitge as Stadtschreiber
- Ursula Am-Ende as Amalie
- Hertha Thiele as Frau Camas
- Willi Neuenhahn as Pötsch
- Kurt Sperling as Borcke
- Jochen Diestelmann as Van Finckenstein
- Kurt Radeke as Pöllnitz
- Franz List as Wartensleben
- Friedrich Wilhelm Dann as Von Boden
- Antal Farkas as Tschurtschenthaler
- Hans Feldner as Lakai
- Hans Flössel as Mime
- Werner Schmidt-Winkelmann as Herr Schulze
