= Midnight Revue =

1962 film

- Directed by: Gottfried Kolditz
- Music by: Gerd Natschinski
- Release date: 1962
- Country: East Germany
- Language: German

Midnight Revue (German: Revue um Mitternacht) is an East German musical film directed by Gottfried Kolditz and starring Christel Bodenstein, Manfred Krug and Werner Lierck. It was released in 1962.

== Bibliography ==
- Lutz Peter Koepnick. The Cosmopolitan Screen: German Cinema and the Global Imaginary, 1945 to the Present. University of Michigan Press, 2007.
