= Weißes Blut =

1959 film

- Directed by: Gottfried Kolditz
- Release date: 1959
- Country: East Germany
- Language: German

Weißes Blut is an East German film. It was released in 1959.
