= Zahn um Zahn =

- Also known as: Zahn um Zahn - Die Praktiken des Dr. Wittkugel
- Created by: Gerhard Jäckel
- Directed by: Peter Hill
- Starring: Alfred Struwe; Helga Piur
- Country of origin: East Germany
- Original language: German
- No. of seasons: 3
- No. of episodes: 21

Production
- Running time: 55–60 minutes
- Production company: Fernsehen der DDR

Original release
- Network: DDR 1
- Release: May 17, 1985 – February 18, 1988

Zahn um Zahn – Die Praktiken des Dr. Wittkugel (Tooth for a Tooth: The Practices of Dr. Wittkugel) was an East German television series broadcast between 1985 and 1988. It starred Alfred Struwe as the East Berlin-based dentist Dr. Alexander Wittkugel and Helga Piur as his receptionist Victoria "Häppchen" Happmeyer.

== See also ==
- List of German television series
