= Von nun ab, Herr Kunze =

1956 film

- Directed by: Gottfried Kolditz
- Release date: 1956
- Country: East Germany
- Language: German

Von nun ab, Herr Kunze is an East German film. It was released in 1956.
