= Strojkovce =

Strojkovce Стројковце
- Village
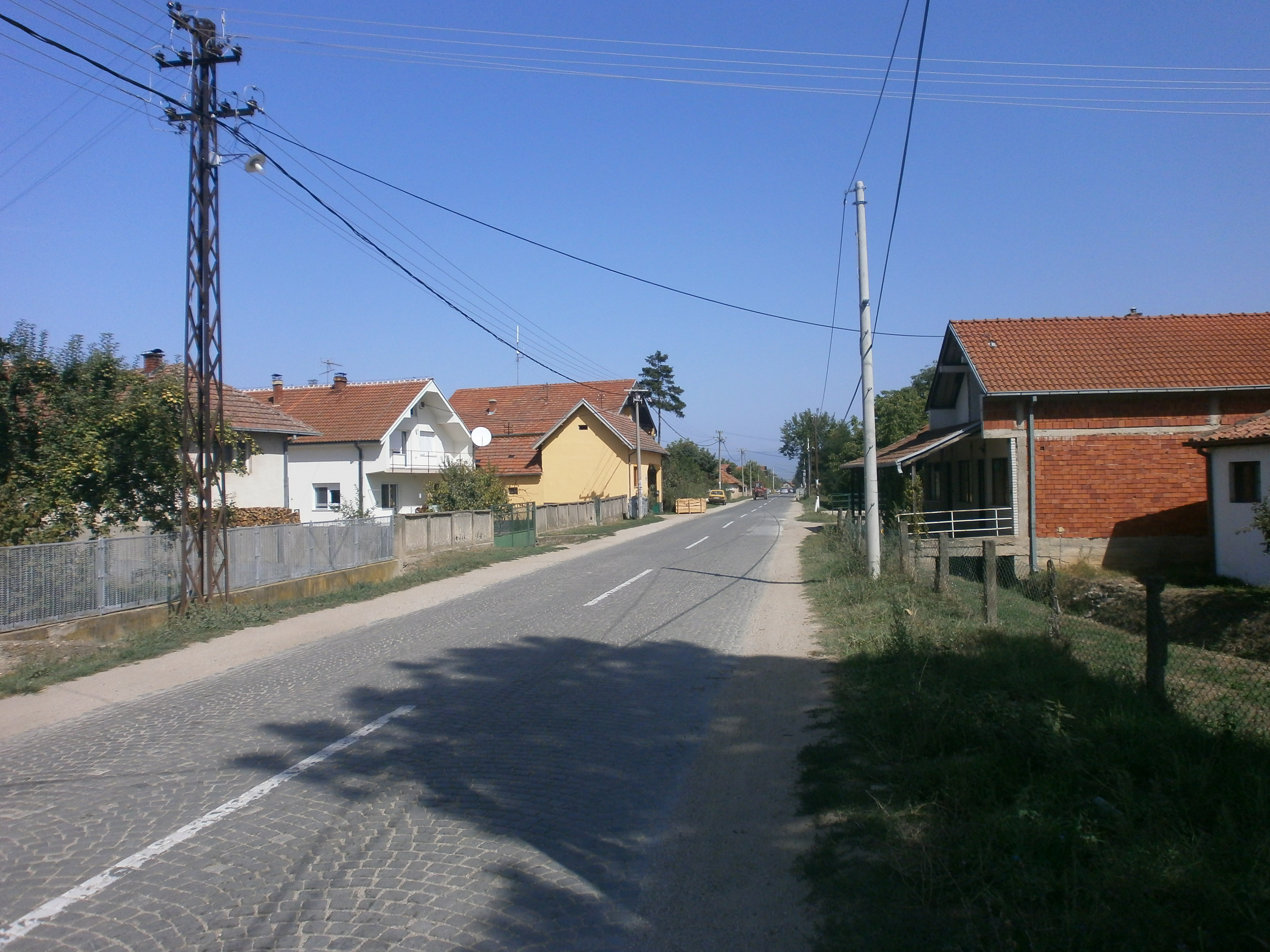
- Strojkovce main street

- Location within Serbia
- Coordinates: 42°54′N 21°55′E
- Country: Serbia
- District: Jablanica District
- Municipality: Leskovac

Area
  - Total: 9.62 km^{2} (3.71 sq mi)
- Elevation: 305 m (1,001 ft)

Population (2011)
  - Total: 1,233
  - Density: 128/km^{2} (332/sq mi)
- Time zone: UTC+1 (CET)
  - Summer (DST): UTC+2 (CEST)

Strojkovce (Serbian Cyrillic: Стројковце) is a village located in the municipality of Leskovac, southern Serbia. According to the 2011 census, the village has a population of 1,233 inhabitants.

The village has 320 households (as of 2020) and 50 business subjects, which is uncharacteristic for a village of such size in Serbia.

== Gallery ==
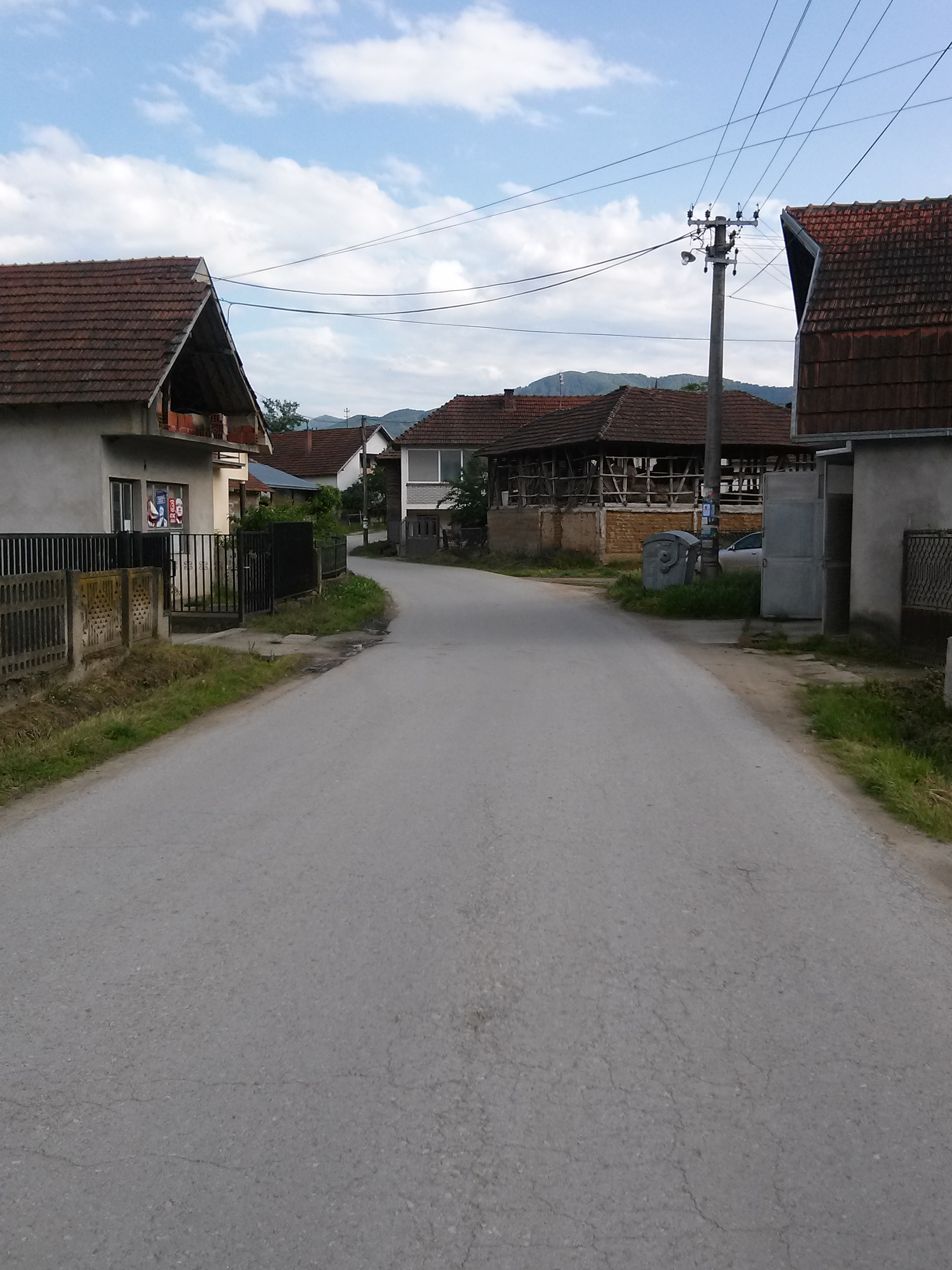
Street in Strojkovce

== Notable people ==
- Gojko Mitić, Serbian actor anda director
