= Werner W. Wallroth =

German film director

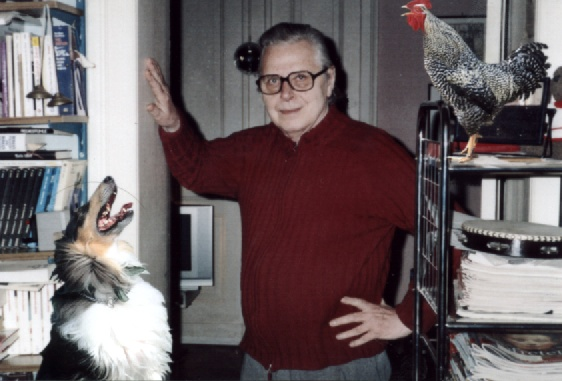
- Werner W. Wallroth, ca. 1985
- Born: 28 February 1930; Erfurt, Germany
- Died: 9 August 2011 (aged 81); Potsdam, Germany
- Occupations: Film director, screenwriter
- Years active: 1961–1991

Werner W. Wallroth (28 February 1930 – 9 August 2011) was a German film director and screenwriter. He directed sixteen films between 1961 and 1991. His 1983 film Zille and Me was entered into the 13th Moscow International Film Festival.

== Selected filmography ==
- Hauptmann Florian von der Mühle (1968)
- Seine Hoheit – Genosse Prinz (1969)
- Blood Brothers (1975)
- Zille and Me (1983)
