= Seine Hoheit – Genosse Prinz =

1969 film

Seine Hoheit - Genosse Prinz
- Directed by: Werner W. Wallroth
- Release date: 1969
- Country: East Germany
- Language: German

Seine Hoheit – Genosse Prinz is an East German film. It was released in 1969.

== Cast ==
- Rolf Ludwig: Kaspar Mai / Eitel Friedrich Prince of Hohenlohe-Liebenstein
- Regina Beyer: Angelika Engel
- Jutta Wachowiak: Princess Diana
- Ilse Voigt: Spreewald Emma
- Mathilde Danegger: Princess
- Klaus Piontek: Hennes
- Rolf Herricht: Bruno
- Wilhelm Gröhl: director
- Axel Triebel: Prince Ferdinand
- Peter Dommisch: Prince Heinrich
- Peter Biele: Count Schwipp
- Rudolf Ulrich: Sebastian
- Gerd E. Schäfer: museum director
- Herwart Grosse: council chief
