= Blood Brothers (1975 film) =

1975 film

- Directed by: Werner W. Wallroth
- Written by: Wolfgang Ebeling; Dean Reed
- Starring: Dean Reed; Gojko Mitic; Gisela Freudenberg
- Cinematography: Hans Heinrich
- Edited by: Helga Emmrich
- Music by: Karl-Ernst Sasse
- Production company: DEFA
- Distributed by: DEFA
- Release date: 26 June 1975
- Running time: 100 minutes
- Country: East Germany
- Language: German

Blood Brothers (German: Blutsbrüder) is a 1975 East German Western film directed by Werner W. Wallroth and starring Dean Reed, Gojko Mitic, and Gisela Freudenberg.

The film's sets were designed by the art directors Heinz Röske and Marlene Willmann. It was made by the state-controlled DEFA company.

The story follows Harmonica, a soldier who deserts the army after witnessing the massacre of a Cheyenne village in Sand Creek, Colorado, in 1864. He joins the Cheyenne community and supports their resistance as military raids continue.

== Cast ==
- Dean Reed as Harmonika
- Gojko Mitic as Harter Felsen
- Gisela Freudenberg as Rehkitz
- Jörg Panknin as Joe
- Cornel Ispas as Big Fred
- Iurie Darie as Bill Simmons
- Sina Fiedler-Engel as Servierin
- Alexandru Manea as Leutnant
- Eugenia Bosânceanu as Frau von Simmons
- Toma Dimitriu as Grauer Elch
- Pedro Hebenstreit as 2.Gast
- Fred Ludwig as 1.Gast
- Joachim Schönitz as Barkeeper
- Elena Sereda as Dicke Frau

== Reception ==
In a 2007 article describing a Goethe-Institut event highlighting various Dean Reed films, Washington City Paper described the film as "pretty lousy" but recommended it to fans of "preening pretty boys, Elvis knockoffs, or cowboy-and-Indian flicks where everyone speaks German."

== Bibliography ==
- Tóth, György Ferenc (2016). From Wounded Knee to Checkpoint Charlie: The Alliance for Sovereignty Between American Indians and Central Europeans in the Late Cold War. Albany: SUNY Press. ISBN 978-1-4384-6123-6.
