= Zille and Me =

1983 film

- Directed by: Werner W. Wallroth
- Written by: Dieter Wardetzky; Peter Rabenalt; Werner W. Wallroth
- Produced by: Hans-Erich Busch
- Starring: Kurt Nolze
- Cinematography: Wolfgang Braumann
- Release dates: July 1983 (Moscow); 27 September 1983 (East Germany)
- Running time: 117 minutes
- Country: East Germany
- Language: German

Zille and Me (German: Zille und ick) is a 1983 East German musical film directed by Werner W. Wallroth. It was entered into the 13th Moscow International Film Festival.

== Cast ==
- Kurt Nolze as Heinrich Zille
- Daniela Hoffmann as Henriette "Jette" Kramer
- Thomas Zieler as Ede Schmidt
- Doris Abeßer as Luise Kramer
- Erik S. Klein as F.W. König
- Helmut Schreiber as Diestelmeyer Sen.
- Hans-Otto Reintsch as Hugo Diestelmeyer
- Marianne Wünscher as Wanda Senfmilch
- Angela Brunner as Olga
- Eckhard Müller as Pluto
- Uwe Zerbe as Karwinkel
