= Josef Mach =

Josef Mach (25 February 1909, in Prostějov – 7 July 1987, in Prague) was a Czech actor, screenwriter and film director.

Josef Mach worked as a journalist and stage performer at the beginning of his career, then in 1938 was appointed assistant director of short films at Grafo Film Studio working with director Václav Kubásek. From 1946 Mach directed many feature films for Barrandov Studios in Prague. He is best known for The Sons of Great Bear, a 1966 Red Western film that he directed for the East German DEFA film studio.

== Filmography ==
Year	Czech title (original title)	English title	Notes
1920	Nikyho velebné dobrodružství		actor
1934	Rozpustilá noc		actor
1934	The Last Man		actor
1937	Naši furianti		actor
1939	Dvojí život		assistant-director; directed by Václav Kubásek
1939	Mořská panna		assistant-director; directed by Václav Kubásek
1939	Ženy u benzinu		writer
1940	Okénko do nebe		writer
1940	Dceruška k pohledání		writer
1941	Advokát chudých		writer
1942	Městečko na dlani		writer
1942	Host do domu		writer
1943	Čtrnáctý u stolu		writer
1943	Skalní plemeno		assistant-director; directed by Ladislav Brom
1945	Bludná pouť		writer
1946	V horách duní	Thunder in the Hills	writer; co-director with Václav Kubásek; a.k.a. The Mountains Are Rumbling
1946	Velký případ	A Big Case	writer; director
1947	Nikdo nic neví	Nobody Knows Anything	director
1947	Portáši		writer
1948	Dravci		writer
1948	Na dobré stopě		director
1948	Zelená knížka	The Green Notebook	writer; director
1949	Vzbouření na vsi	The Village Revolt	writer; director
1949	Rodinné trampoty oficiála Tříšky		writer; director
1950	Racek má zpoždění		director
1952	Akce B	Action B	director
1953	Rodná zem	Our Native Land	writer; director
1956	Hrátky s čertem	Playing with the Devil	writer; director
1956	Muž v povětří		writer
1957	Florenc 13:30		writer; director
1958	Hořká láska	Bitter Love	writer; director
1958	O věcech nadpřirozených		writer
1958	Tři přání cestující		actor
1958	Zatoulané dělo	The Lost Gun	writer; director; a.k.a. The Missing Cannon
1960	Valčík pro milión	Waltz for a Million	writer; director
1961	Florián		writer; director
1962	Medailonograf Frantiska Filipovského		director; documentary short film
1962	Prosím, nebudit!		writer; director
1963	Tři chlapi v chalupě		director; serial film
1966	Die Söhne der großen Bärin	The Sons of Great Bear	director; a.k.a. The Sons of the Great Mother Bear; German language film; Czech title: Synové Velké medvědice
1966	Der schwarze Panther		director; German language film; Czech title: Černý panther
1968	Objížďka	The Detour	writer; director
1970	Na kolejích čeká vrah		writer; director
1971	Člověk není sám		writer; director
1973	Tři nevinní		writer; director
1976	Paleta lásky	Palette of Love	writer; director
1977	Tichý Američan v Praze	Quiet American in Prague	writer; director

== Sources ==
- Josef Mach at České filmové nebe (Czech Film Heaven) (in Czech)
- Josef Mach at IMDb
