= Ilse Voigt (actress) =

German actress

- Born: 3 February 1905; Pirna, German Empire
- Died: 3 June 1990 (aged 85); Magdeburg, East Germany
- Occupation: Actress
- Years active: 1956-1989 (film)

Ilse Voigt (1905–1990) was a German stage, film and television actress.

== Selected filmography ==
- Intrigue and Love (1959)
- The Rabbit Is Me' (1965)
- Seine Hoheit – Genosse Prinz (1969)
- Husaren in Berlin (1971)

== Bibliography ==
- Peter Cowie & Derek Elley. World Filmography: 1967. Fairleigh Dickinson University Press, 1977.
