= Ostern =

Western-inspired film genre

The Ostern ("Eastern"; Russian: истерн, romanized: Istern; or остерн) is a film genre created in the Soviet Union and Eastern Bloc as a variation of the Western films. The word Ostern is a portmanteau derived from the German word Ost, meaning "East", and the English word western. Two subgenres may be distinguished (although the terms may be used interchangeably):

- Red Westerns, set in America's "Wild West" but involving radically different themes and interpretations from US Westerns. These Westerns were mostly produced in the Eastern Bloc, especially in East Germany and Czechoslovakia. Examples of Red Westerns include Lemonade Joe or the Horse Opera (Czechoslovakia, 1964), The Sons of Great Bear (East Germany, 1966), The Oil, the Baby and the Transylvanians (Romania, 1981), and A Man from the Boulevard des Capucines (USSR, 1987).
- Easterns (Osterns) were set domestically on the steppes and Central Asian regions of the USSR, typically during the Russian Revolution or the following Civil War. Easterns were presented in a style heavily influenced by American Western films. Examples of this genre include The Elusive Avengers (1966) and its sequels, White Sun of the Desert (1970), Dauria (1971), At Home Among Strangers (1974) and The Bodyguard (1979).

== Context and origins ==
American Westerns were among the US films imported into the early Soviet Union. As a result, certain Soviet films at the time are seen to incorporate Western elements. For example, the image of the Western cowboy is used to symbolize the United States and the West as a whole in the Soviet silent comedy The Extraordinary Adventures of Mr. West in the Land of the Bolsheviks (1924). Red Devils is a revolutionary action film that also borrows from the Western genre. As cultural restrictions tightened during the Stalinist era, however, Western-inspired films in the Soviet Union became rare. However, Stalin was an avid enjoyer of Hollywood Western films, and is argued by some to have desired the Western genre within the Soviet Union.

=== Emergence of the Ostern genre ===
1957's Miles of Fire is one of the earliest examples of a Soviet Western as it was released years before the Ostern genre became formalized and prevalent. The Western genre saw a resurgence in the Soviet Union in the 1960s, largely resulting from the Khrushchev Thaw. In 1962, the USSR allowed for the screening of certain US and foreign films. The Magnificent Seven, an American Western starring Steve McQueen, become the most successful of these films commercially, becoming an instant cult classic amongst Soviet moviegoers. The overwhelming popularity and commercial demand of films like The Magnificent Seven enticed Soviet filmmakers and state-run film institutions to experiment with Western elements in their own productions, resulting in the creation of the Soviet Western.

The Czechoslovak comedy Lemonade Joe, or the Horse Opera (1964) gained popularity amongst Soviet citizens and those in the Eastern Bloc. Though the film is largely a parody of the Western genre, its commercial success nonetheless furthered the familiarity of Western tropes within the Eastern Bloc and the general Soviet audience.

Karl May's Treasure of Silver Lake, West Germany, co-production with Yugoslavia, was seminal for the beginning of the era of German Red Westerns. The film prompted a highly successful series of Indianerfilme ("Indian Films") about Winnetou and others, produced by the East German DEFA studios. The East German The Sons of the Great Bear (1966) was a seminal Red Western that turned the traditional American "Cowboy and Indian" conventions on their head, casting the Native Americans as the heroes and the American Army as the villains, a motif inspired by highly successful German Osterns. These films were immensely popular among the East German audience, furthering the widespread German fascination of Native American culture (see Native American Hobbyism in Germany).

A considerable strain into the genre was added by Romanian cinematographers, which included adaptations of Fenimore Cooper stories, with many of them being co-productions with Western directors.

White Sun of the Desert (1970) has been described as the quintessential Ostern, with its release considered by some to usher in the "golden era" of Soviet Western film. Set in rural Turkmenistan, the film incorporates many elemental Western characteristics, namely wide shots of empty skies and nature, transportation via horse and leather saddle, and the lone stoic protagonist. The film quickly obtained a cult-like status, with multiple catchphrases from the film making its way into casual conversation.

== Other monikers in the genre ==
=== Gibanica Western ===
"Gibanica Western" was a short-lived term for the Yugoslav equivalent of the Ostern, more commonly known as partisan film and, sometimes, the Partisan Western. They were made in the 1960s, 1970s and 1980s, and were about the partisans in World War II. Gibanica is a traditional Balkan pastry, and the name of the genre is dubbed in an analogy with "spaghetti Western".

=== Goulash Western ===
The Goulash Westerns are the Easterns of Hungarian director György Szomjas. He directed two films (The Wind Blows Under Your Feet and Wrong-Doers) in the 1970s, shot in the Hortobágy National Park, the best approximation of wastelands he could find in the country.

== Notable Red Westerns and Osterns ==
- 1924: The Extraordinary Adventures of Mr. West in the Land of the Bolsheviks, a silent Soviet comedy film. An American millionaire hires a cowboy for his travel across the Soviet Union, but Soviet crooks fool them. Plenty of chases and shootings. Critics consider it the beginning of a "golden age" of Soviet cinema.
- 1925: Red Devils, Soviet;
- 1937: The Thirteen, Soviet; allegedly shot on an order of Joseph Stalin, who was a fan of Westerns
- 1950: Brave People, Soviet; Norbert Franz hesitatingly writes that it had "little to do more with Westerns than the horses used".
- 1957: Miles of Fire, Soviet
- 1962: Treasure of Silver Lake, West Germany, co-production with Yugoslavia; marks the beginning of the era of West German Westerns
- 1964: Lemonade Joe, Czechoslovakia
- 1966, The Sons of Great Bear, East Germany

1966: The Elusive Avengers, a remake of Red Devils

- 1967: Chingachgook, die große Schlange, East Germany
- 1968: Spur des Falken, East Germany

1968: Weiße Wölfe, East Germany

- 1970: White Sun of the Desert, Soviet; "a slightly ironic Eastern", a box office hit with over 34 million viewers that year

1970: Meeting at the Old Mosque, Tajik SSR
1970: ru:Конец атамана, Kazakh SSR; some classify it as Eastern, but on shaky grounds. It had three sequels with the same lead character, chekist Chadyarov

- 1971: Dauria (two parts)
- 1972: The Seventh Bullet, Uzbek SSR
- 1973: The Headless Horseman, Soviet-Cuban Red Western
- 1974: At Home among Strangers
- 1976 Talpuk alatt fütyül a szél (translated as "The Wind Blows Under Your Feet" or "The Wind is Whistling under Their Feet"), "Goulash Western" of György Szomjas
- 1979 Wrong-Doers, "Goulash Western" of György Szomjas
- 1979: The Bodyguard, Tajik SSR
- 1981: The Oil, the Baby and the Transylvanians (Romania)

1981: Sing, Cowboy, Sing comedy Western (tagged for ages 10 and up); "a failed attempt of a parody of Westerns for children"

- 1987: A Man from the Boulevard des Capucines (USSR, 1987)
- 1993: The Wild East, Kazakhstan; postapocalyptic Eastern
- 1995: Wolf Blood

See also: ru:Категория:Истерны

== See also ==
- DEFA (film studio)
  - Gojko Mitić, German-Serbian actor, best known for his roles of Native Americans in numerous DEFA Indianerfilme.
- Native American hobbyism in Germany, a hobby consisting of Germans impersonating American Indian culture.
- Vsevolod Ivanov, Soviet writer who was a formative influence on the Ostern.

== Bibliography ==
- Franz, Norbert P. (2020). Hollywood – a Challenge for the Soviet Cinema: Four Essays (PDF). Universitätsverlag Potsdam. ISBN 978-3-86956-490-6.
- Miller, Cynthia J.; Riper, A. Bowdoin Van (2013-11-21). International Westerns: Re-Locating the Frontier. Scarecrow Press, Bloomsbury Publishing PLC. ISBN 978-0-8108-9288-0.
