= Gojko Mitić =

Serbian-German actor and director (born 1940)

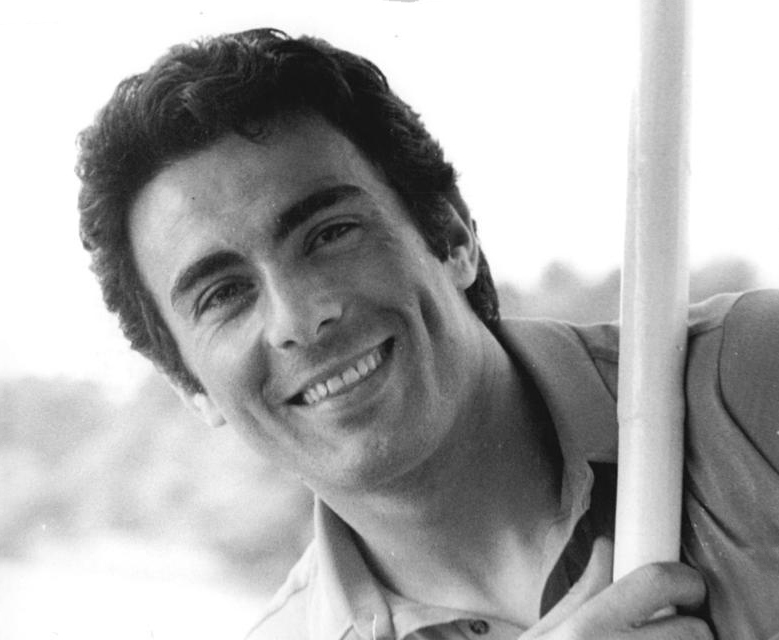
- Gojko Mitić in 1969
- Born: 13 June 1940 (age 86); Strojkovce, Kingdom of Yugoslavia (now Serbia)
- Occupations: Actor, stuntman, director

Gojko Mitić (Serbian Cyrillic: Гојко Митић; born June 13, 1940) is a Serbian-German actor and director. He gained great popularity in East Germany for his portrayal of historical and fictional Native American characters in numerous DEFA Indian films. His popularity may stem from the fact that both in East Germany and later in West Germany attempts were made to attach labels to him: "DEFA bosses" on the one hand, "Winnetou of the East" on the other. However, Mitić never portrayed the latter role in a film, although he did later at the Karl May Festival in Bad Segeberg. This Winnetou formulation refers more to the popularity of Mitić compared to the actor of the role from the West, the Frenchman Pierre Brice.

According to Mitić, he speaks all Slavic languages, German, a little Italian and English.

== Life ==
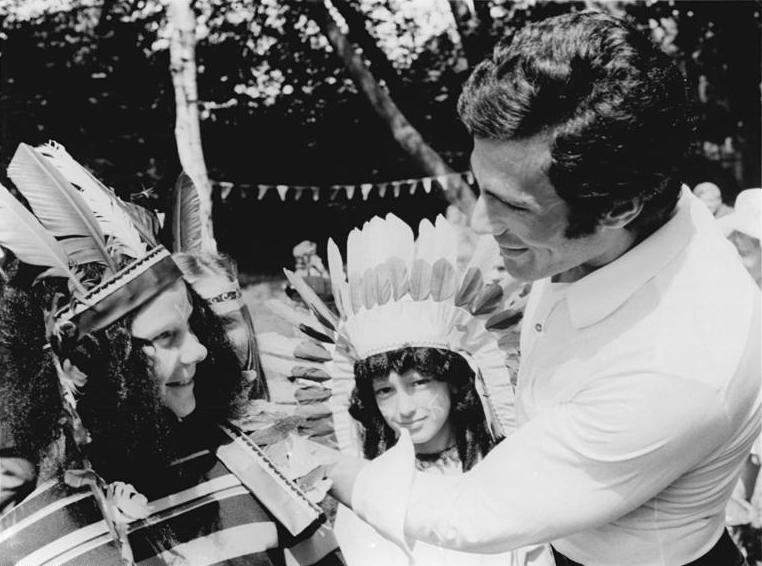
Mitic at the Summer Film Days, 1971

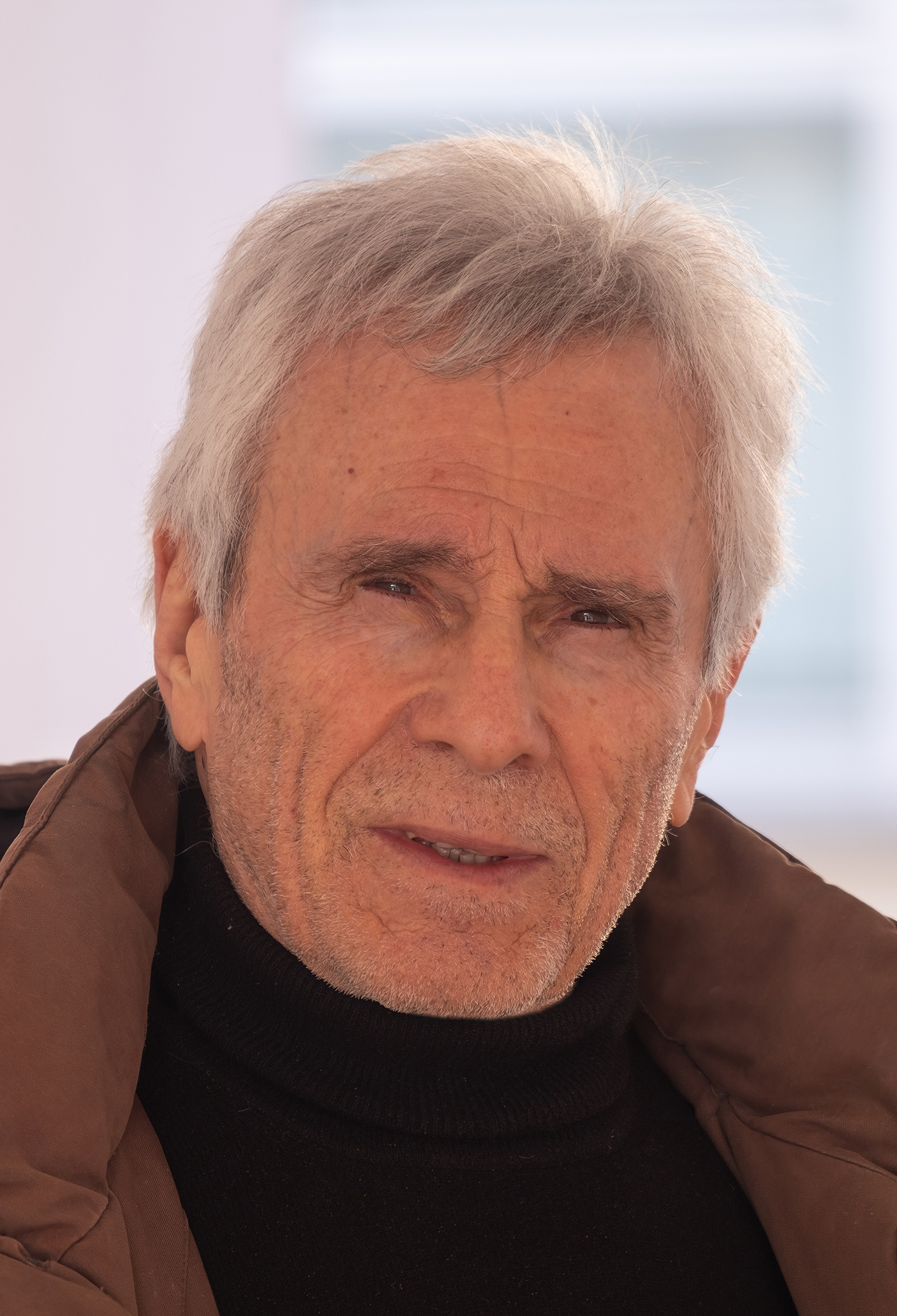
Gojko Mitić in 2023

Mitić comes from a farming family in the village of Strojkovce near Leskovac (at the time Kingdom of Yugoslavia, today Serbia), on the Veternica river in Southern Serbia. Since his father Živojin took part in the liberation struggle of Yugoslav partisans in World War II, he grew up with his brother Dragan with his grandparents. After his school education, during which he was also taught German for four years, Mitić, at the age of 20, began to study sports at the Sports University in Belgrade. During his studies he made his first contact with film. At that time many international films were being produced in Yugoslavia, whose extras were mainly students from the Belgrade Sports University.

From 1961 Mitić stepped up as a stuntman in Italian and British films. In 1963, he landed a tiny role in the Artur Brauner-produced Karl May film Old Shatterhand. Impressed by his athletic appearance, he was given the opportunity, after the Rialto production Winnetou Part 2, to take on a larger role in Unter Geiern as the chief's son, Wokadeh, in the next film in the series. Here his name appeared in the credits in German as "Georg Mitic".

Then the DEFA in Yugoslavia also began to shoot DEFA Indian (Native American) films: in 1966 Mitić played his first leading role as the Lakota chief Tokei-ihto in The Sons of the Big Bear. Nine million GDR citizens saw the film in the cinema. This started his film career, especially in the GDR, where he achieved extraordinary popularity. In 1967 he played the Mohican Chingachgook, in 1968 and 1969 the Dakota chief Far-sighted Falcon, in 1970 the Shoshone Shave Head, in 1971 the Seminole Osceola, in 1972 Tecumseh, in 1973 and 1974 the Apache chief Ulzana, in 1975 the Cheyenne Harter Felsen, in 1978 the Manzanero Severino and in 1983 the Nez Percé White Feather.

In addition to Eastern Europe, Mitić also became known in Africa and Asia through the DEFA films. He was in front of the camera for at least one film every year until 1975, playing almost exclusively Indian chiefs. In order to avoid his easily audible accent, Mitić, although he speaks fluent German, was dubbed. The fact that he actually performed all the stunts himself as an actor, such as Horse Running and in various other scenes, gave his portrayal of the heroic character a high degree of credibility.

In 1976, the GDR rock group Express paid homage to him in their song Ein Wigwam steht in Babelsberg. From the summer of 1976 Mitić was seen for the first time with the role of Spartacus in the Harz Mountain Theater Thale. There he played mostly adventure plays until 1984, which were also recorded for East German television.

However, Mitić did not only shoot Indian films. He acted in the theatre, at times he also stood in front of the camera for science fiction (Signals - A Space Adventure) and television productions (Archive of Death, Front without Mercy). Renate Blume was his film partner several times, with whom he lived for a number of years in the 1970s. In addition to acting, Mitić has also appeared as a singer (1977 with Löscht das Feuer (music: Arndt Bause), 2010 reissued by Engel B. in a more modern guise; 1978 with A Man Can Tell a Lot) and moderator (Ein Kessel Buntes, gong) on. From 1981 to 1989 he directed five films in the children's series Jan and Tini, for which he also wrote the screenplays.

In 1988 he took on his last Indian role for GDR television in the two-part DEFA television film Prairie Hunters in Mexico based on the novel by Karl May.

== Post-Communism ==
After the fall of communism, Mitić played smaller roles again (The Movie Narrator, Burning Life, Heroes Like Us); from 1992 he took over the role of Winnetou as successor to Pierre Brice at the Karl May Games in Bad Segeberg. On September 10, 2006, after a total of 15 seasons and 1024 performances, Mitić gave his last performance for the time being. Appropriately, this year Winnetou III was played, in which Winnetou finally dies. Seven years later, Mitić returned to Bad Segeberg in the role of Intschu tschuna, the father of his former character.

From 2007 to 2009 Mitić played the chief Bromden in the play One Flew Over the Cuckoo's Nest in the Schwerin State Theater. At the same theater he played the leading role in a musical based on the novel Alexis Sorbas by Nikos Kazantzakis at the 2009 Castle Festival.

In 2012 Gojko Mitić u. a. with Uwe Jensen with "Music at the campfire" or "Christmas at the campfire". In 2013, Gojko Mitić returned to TV screens as the level-headed Comanche chief Tahmahkera in the Sat1 western production Striving for Freedom (with Benno Fürmann, Emilia Schüle and Nadja Uhl, among others). It is the first Native American film in which Mitić can be heard singing his own voice, albeit entirely in a Comanche dialect. Since 2015 there has been a fan meeting dedicated to him at El Dorado in Templin, where Mitić always appears as a guest of honour. In December 2019 he received the Lifetime Achievement Award from the DEFA Foundation. The eulogy was given by the singer Ute Freudenberg.

Gojko Mitić lives in Berlin-Köpenick and has one daughter (born 1992). He is a German and Serbian citizen.

== Career ==
Mitić is known for a numerous series of Red Westerns from the GDR DEFA Studios, featuring Native Americans as the heroes, rather than white settlers as in many American Westerns. Beginning with The Sons of Great Bear (1966), he starred in 12 films of this type between 1966 and 1984. He contributed to the popular image of Native Americans in German-speaking countries.

In an attempt to move away from his fame based on these Westerns, Mitić, in his later career, increasingly sought to appear in other genres, on film, on television and on stage. Among other roles, he played Spartacus on stage and presented several TV shows.

He also played Karl May's Winnetou in seasons at the "Karl-May-Festspiele" until 2006 in Bad Segeberg near Hamburg, Germany. In one episode he played a role at the German television program Schloss Einstein.

== Awards and honors ==
In 1998, Bulgarian rock band Hipodil composed a song, "Bate Goiko", dedicated to Mitić. In 2010, he received the Brothers Karić Award in Serbia. Asteroid 147595 Gojkomitić, discovered by André Knöfel and Gerhard Lehmann in 2004, was named in his honor. The official naming citation was published by the Minor Planet Center on 27 January 2013 (M.P.C. 82401).

== Selected filmography ==
- Last of the Renegades (Winnetou 2. Teil) (1964)
- Among Vultures (Unter Geiern) (1964)
- The Sons of Great Bear (Die Söhne der großen Bärin) (1966)
- Chingachgook, die große Schlange (1967)
- Spur des Falken (1968)
- Weiße Wölfe (1969)
- Tecumseh (1972)
- Ulzana (1974)
- Blood Brothers (1975)
- Archiv des Todes (1980)
- The Balkan Line (Балканский рубеж) (2019)
