= Weiße Wölfe =

1969 film

- Directed by: Konrad Petzold
- Starring: Gojko Mitić; Horst Schulze; Barbara Brylska; Slobodan Dimitrijević
- Music by: Karl-Ernst Sasse
- Release date: 1969
- Countries: East Germany; Yugoslavia
- Language: German

Weiße Wölfe is an East German-Yugoslav Red Western film. It was released in 1969, and sold 4,601,516 tickets.

Weiße Wölfe (White Wolves) is a sequel to the 1968 film Spur des Falken.
