= Spur des Falken =

1968 East German film

- Directed by: Gottfried Kolditz
- Cinematography: Otto Hanisch
- Music by: Karl-Ernst Sasse
- Release date: 1968
- Country: East Germany
- Language: German

Spur des Falken is an East German film. It was released in 1968.

The film was followed by a sequel, Weiße Wölfe (White Wolves) in 1969.

== Cast ==
- Gojko Mitić as Weitspähender Falke
- Hannjo Hasse as Joe Bludgeon
- Barbara Brylska as Catherine Emerson
- Lali Meszchi as Blauhaar
- Rolf Hoppe as James Bashan
- Hartmut Beer as Fletcher
- Helmut Schreiber as Samuel Blake
- Fred Delmare as Peter Hille
- Milan Jablonsky as Bad Face
- Holger Mahlich as Pat
- Fred Ludwig as Emmerson
- Horst Kube as Chat
