= DEFA =

Former state-owned film studio in East Germany

Deutsche Film-Aktiengesellschaft DEFA
- Formation: 17 May 1946
- Dissolved: 1992
- Headquarters: East Berlin
- Location: East Germany

DEFA (Deutsche Film-Aktiengesellschaft) was the state-owned film studio of the German Democratic Republic (East Germany) throughout the country's existence. Since 2019, DEFA's film heritage has been made accessible and licensable on the PROGRESS archive platform. The DEFA Foundation is a non-profit organisation that was established in order to preserve the films in the DEFA library as well as the film studios, and make them accessible to the public.

== History ==
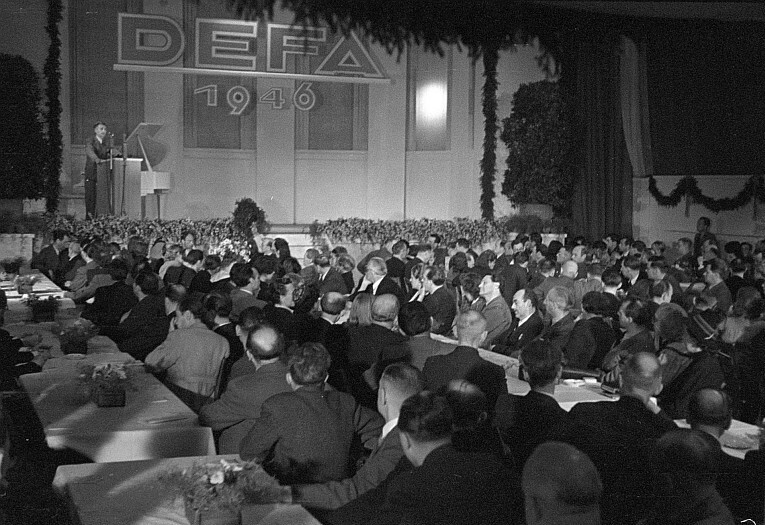
Founding congress of DEFA Studio, Berlin, May 1946

DEFA was founded in Spring 1946 in the Soviet occupation zone in Eastern Germany; it was the first film production company in post-World War II Germany. While the other Allies, in their zones of occupation, viewed a rapid revival of a German film industry with suspicion, the Soviets valued the medium as a primary means of re-educating the German populace as it emerged from twelve years of Nazi rule.

Headquartered in Berlin, the company was formally authorized by the Soviet Military Administration to produce films on 13 May 1946, although Wolfgang Staudte had already begun work on DEFA's first film, The Murderers Are Among Us nine days earlier. The original board of directors consisted of Alfred Lindemann, Karl Hans Bergmann, and Herbert Volkmann, with Hans Klering as administrative Secretary. Klering, a former graphic designer, also designed DEFA's logo. On 13 August 1946, the company was officially registered as a joint-stock company (German: Aktiengesellschaft). By the end of the year, in addition to the Staudte film, it had completed two other feature films using the former Tobis studio facilities in Berlin and the Althoff Studios in Babelsberg. Subsequently, its principal studio was the Babelsberg Studio built by Ufa in the 1920s.

On 14 July 1947, the company officially moved its headquarters to the Babelsberg Studio, and on 13 November 1947, the company's "stock" was taken over by the Socialist Unity Party or SED, which had originally capitalized DEFA, and pro-Soviet German individuals. Soviets Ilya Trauberg and Aleksandr Wolkenstein joined Lindemann, Bergmann and Volkmann on the board of directors, and a committee was established under the auspices of the Socialist Unity Party to review projects and screen rushes.

In July 1948, Lindemann was dismissed from the board of directors because of alleged "financial irregularities" and replaced briefly by Walter Janka. In October 1948, the SED was instrumental in replacing Janka, Volkmann and Bergmann as corporate directors with official party members Wilhelm Meissner, Alexander Lösche and Grete Keilson. In December, the death of Trauberg and the resignation of Wolkenstein resulted in two more Soviets in their stead, Aleksandr Andriyevsky and Leonid Antonov.

In 1948, the division of Germany into zones controlled by the Soviet Union and by the Western Allies came into effect. The SED eventually became openly Communist, with a strong Stalinist orientation. On 23 May 1949, the Allies' Germany officially became the Federal Republic of Germany (commonly known as West Germany), and on 7 October 1949, the Soviet zone officially became the German Democratic Republic (East Germany). Ownership of DEFA as well as all DEFA assets were transferred to the newly created state. On 23 June 1950, Sepp Schwab, a hardline Communist, was appointed director-general of DEFA.

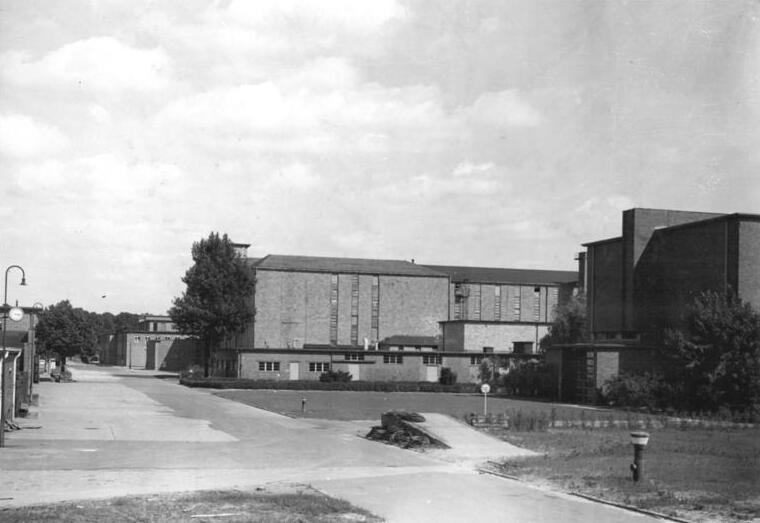
DEFA feature film studios, Babelsberg, Potsdam, July 1952

As socialist realism took hold at DEFA, the definition of desirable and acceptable themes for films became narrower. In June 1947, a film writer's conference held in Potsdam produced general agreement that the "new" German cinema would disavow both subjects and stylistic elements reminiscent of those seen on German screens during, and prior to, the Nazi era. By 1949, expectations for scripts were codified around a small number of topics, such as "[re-]distribution of land" or "the two-year plan". As in the Soviet Union, the excessive control placed by the state on authors of screenplays, as against other literary works, discouraged many competent writers from contributing to East German film. Screenwriters could find their efforts rejected for ideological reasons at any stage in script development, if not from the outset. As a result, between 1948 and 1953, when Stalin died, the entire film output for East Germany, excluding newsreels and non-theatrical educational films, amounted to fewer than 50 titles.

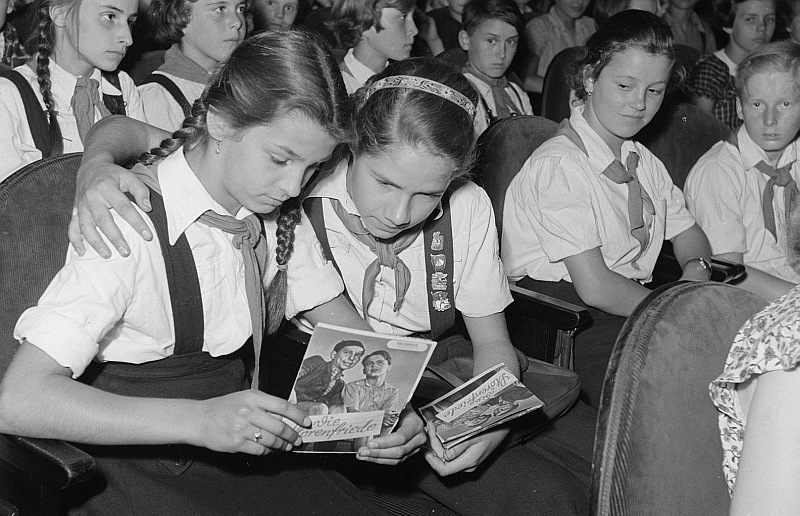
Two Young Pioneers examine the brochure for the DEFA children's film Die Störenfriede (The Troublemakers) before a screening, July 1953.

In the 1960s, DEFA produced the popular Red Western The Sons of the Great Mother Bear, directed by Josef Mach and starring Gojko Mitić as the Sioux Tokei-itho. This spawned a number of sequels and was notable for inverting Western clichés by portraying the native Americans as the "good guys", and the American army as the "baddies".

In 1992, after German reunification, DEFA was officially dissolved and its combined studios sold to a French conglomerate, Compagnie Générale des Eaux, later Vivendi Universal. In 2004, a private consortium acquired the studios. The films produced at the DEFA studios after World War II included approximately 950 feature films, 820 animated films, more than 5,800 documentaries and newsreels, and 4,000 foreign language movies dubbed into German, which were acquired by the privatized successor to the former East German film distribution monopoly, PROGRESS.

In October 2005, the Museum of Modern Art in New York City hosted a two-week DEFA festival.

== Das Stacheltier ==
Stacheltier (Note: "Stacheltier" is German colloquial for 'hedgehog' or 'porcupine'.) was a production group of DEFA that produced satirical series of short films from 1953 to 1964. The short films were meant to be shown in film theatres preceding the newsreel and the main feature. The only feature film in the series was the silent film Der junge Engländer directed by Gottfried Kolditz in 1958.

Many well-known East German directors and actors contributed to the film series, including Frank Beyer, Erwin Geschonneck, Gisela May, Rudolf Wessely, Otto Tausig, Peter Sturm, Rolf Herricht and Heinz Schubert.

In 2019, Progress was acquired by LOOKSfilm. Since April 1, 2019, the entire film heritage of the GDR has been made internationally accessible and licensable on the Progress Film archive platform.

== DEFA Film studios ==
- DEFA-Studio für Spielfilme in Potsdam-Babelsberg (studio for feature films)
- DEFA-Studio für Trickfilme in Dresden (studio for animated films)
- DEFA-Studio für populärwissenschaftliche Filme in Potsdam, Alt-Nowawes (studio for educational films)
- DEFA-Studio für Wochenschau und Dokumentarfilme in Berlin (studio for news reels and documentation films)
- DEFA-Studio für Synchronisation in Berlin-Johannisthal (studio for dubbing)
- DEFA-Kopierwerke in Berlin-Köpenick and Berlin-Johannisthal (factory for movie copying)
- DEFA-Außenhandel in Berlin (foreign trade)

== DEFA Foundation ==
The DEFA Foundation is a non-profit organisation established by the Federal Government of Germany on 15 December 1998. It was established in order to preserve the films in the DEFA library, as well as the former East German film studios, and oversee their use for the public good as part of the national cultural heritage of Germany. It holds around 700 feature films; 450 short fiction films; 950 animated films; 2,000 documentary films; 2,500 serial films; 6,700 German language dubbed foreign films; various other films made after 1990, and various ephemera such as film posters and manuscripts. The foundation has also been making digitised copies of its films since 2012.

In 2013, the foundation established the Heiner Carow Prize (for best German young film), which is awarded to films shown in the Panorama program of the Berlin International Film Festival.

== See also ==
- Babelsberg Studio
- Broadcasting in East Germany
- East Side Story, a documentary that discusses DEFA's musicals
- Category: East German actors
- Category: East German films
- Culture of East Germany
- DEFA Film Library, at University of Massachusetts Amherst, United States
- List of East German films
- Ostern
- PROGRESS

== Bibliography ==
- Allan, Sean; Sandford, John, (eds.) DEFA: East German Cinema, 1946–1992. New York and Oxford, Berghahn Books, 1999
- Allan, Sean; Heiduschke, Sebastian (eds.) Re-Imagining DEFA: East German Cinema in its National and Transnational Contexts. Berghahn Books, 2016
- Bergfelder, Tim; Carter, Erica & Goektuerk, Deniz, (eds.) The German Cinema Book. Berkeley: BFI/University of California Press. 2003.
- Berghahn, Daniela. Hollywood behind the Wall: the Cinema of East Germany. Manchester: Manchester University Press, 2005
- Beyer, Frank. Wenn der Wind sich dreht: Meine Filme, mein Leben. Econ. 2001.
- Elsaesser, Thomas & Wedel, Michael. The BFI Companion to German Cinema. London: British Film Institute, 1999.
- Habel, F.-B. Das grosse Lexikon der DEFA-Spielfilme, Berlin: Schwarzkopf & Schwarzkopf, 2000
- Heiduschke, Sebastian. East German Cinema: DEFA and Film History. New York: Palgrave Macmillan, 2013.
- Naughton, Leonie. That Was the Wild East: Film Culture, Unification, and the `New´ Germany. Ann Arbor, 2002.
- Preuss, Evelyn. "'You Say You Want a Revolution': East German Film at the Crossroads between the Cinemas." In Celluloid Revolt: German Screen Cultures and the Long 1968, edited by Christina Gerhardt and Marco Abel, 218-236. Rochester, NY: Boydell, 2019.
- Schenk, Ralf; Richter, Erika (eds.) apropos: Film 2001 Das Jahrbuch der DEFA-Stiftung. Das Neue Berlin, 2001.
- Schittly, Dagmar. Zwischen Regie und Regime: die Filmpolitik der SED im Spiegel der DEFA-Produktionen. Berlin, 2002.
- Silberman, Marc; Wrage, Henning (eds.) DEFA at the Crossroads of East German and International Film Culture. A Companion. Berlin/Boston: De Gruyter, 2014.
- Wagner, Brigitta B. (ed.) DEFA after East Germany. Rochester: Camden House, 2014.
