= Max von der Grün =

German novelist (1926–2005)

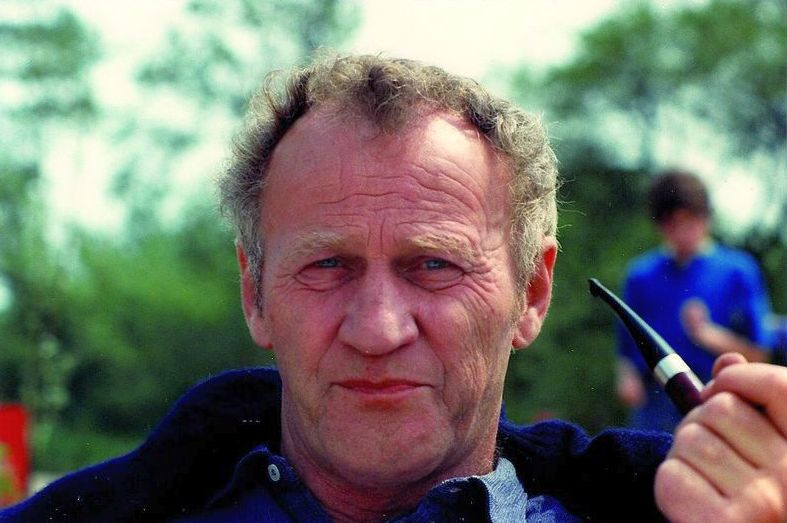
- Max von der Grün
- Born: 25 May 1926; Bayreuth, Bavaria, Germany
- Died: 7 April 2005 (aged 78); Dortmund, North Rhine-Westphalia, Germany
- Writing career
- Genres: Novels, short stories, poetry, essays, proletarian literature, children's literature, plays

Max von der Grün (German: [maks fɔn dɐ̯ ɡʁyːn]; 25 May 1926 – 7 April 2005) was a German writer.

Max von der Grün was born in Sankt Georgen (Bayreuth) and grew up in Mitterteich. After a clerical apprenticeship, he became a paratrooper during World War II in 1944. He was captured by U.S. forces near Quimper (France) and became a prisoner of war, spending three years in prison camps in Scotland, Louisiana, Texas, and New Mexico.

After his release, he worked as a bricklayer, and from 1951 to 1963 in the Zeche Königsborn mine near Unna. He started writing in 1955, initially poetry, later focusing on worker-class themes.

His breakthrough was his second novel, Irrlicht und Feuer, which was published in 1963 and follows a German coal miner during a few months. The novel created discussion in West Germany and also became successful in East Germany, where it was adapted into a television film with the same name. Grün wrote approximately 20 books, notably the 1976 children's book Vorstadtkrokodile.

He was a founding member of the Dortmunder Gruppe 61, and a member of the International PEN.

Grün died in Dortmund.

== Works ==
- Geheimes Kochbuch, Darmstadt 1960
- Männer in zweifacher Nacht, Recklinghausen 1962
- Irrlicht und Feuer, Recklinghausen 1963
- Fahrtunterbrechung und andere Erzählungen, Frankfurt a. M. 1965
- Feierabend, Recklinghausen 1968 (together with Hans Dieter Schwarze)
- Zwei Briefe an Pospischiel, Neuwied u. a. 1968
- Flug über Zechen und Wälder. Nordrhein-Westfalen. Land der Gegensätze, Braunschweig 1970
- Urlaub am Plattensee, Stierstadt i. Ts. 1970
- Am Tresen gehn die Lichter aus, Stierstadt (im Taunus) 1972
- Stenogramm, Düsseldorf 1972
- Ein Tag wie jeder andere. Düsseldorf [1973], 2. Aufl. 1976; u.d.T.: Ein Tag wie jeder andere. Reisen in die Gegenwart. Nach Südiler und zurück. München 1978
- Menschen in Deutschland (BRD). 7 Porträts, Darmstadt u. a. 1973
- Stellenweise Glatteis, Darmstadt u. a. 1973
- Leben im gelobten Land. Gastarbeiterporträts, Darmstadt u. a. 1975
- Wenn der tote Rabe vom Baum fällt, München 1975
- Vorstadtkrokodile, München 1976
- Flächenbrand, Darmstadt u. a. 1979
- Unsere Fabrik (Fotoband), Luzern [u.a.] 1979 (together with Oren Schmuckler and Günter Wallraff)
- Wie war das eigentlich? Kindheit und Jugend im Dritten Reich Darmstadt u. a. 1979, als Taschenbuch: dtv ISBN 3-423-12098-3
- Etwas außerhalb der Legalität und andere Erzählungen, Darmstadt u. a. 1980
- Unterwegs in Deutschland, Reinbek bei Hamburg 1980
- Klassengespräche, Darmstadt u. a. 1981
- Maloche. Leben im Revier [Fotobuch mit der Gruppe Anthrazit], Frankfurt am Main 1982
- Späte Liebe, Darmstadt u. a. 1982
- Friedrich und Friederike, Darmstadt u. a. 1983
- Unser schönes Nordrhein-Westfalen. Von Menschen und Natur, von Kohle und Kultur, Frankfurt am Main 1983
- Die Lawine, Darmstadt u. a. 1986
- Waldläufer und Brückensteher, Stuttgart 1987
- Das Revier. Eine Liebeserklärung, Dortmund 1988 (together with Peter Iwers)
- Eine Jugend in Franken, Göttingen 1990
- Springflut, Frankfurt am Main 1990
- Die Saujagd und andere Vorstadtgeschichten, München 1995
- Die schöne Unbekannte, Reinbek bei Hamburg 1997
- Vorstadtkrokodile. Eine Geschichte vom Aufpassen; ein Leseprojekt zu dem gleichnamigen Roman von Max von der Grün. Berlin 2000 (together with S. Schlepp-Pellny)

== Filmography ==
- Irrlicht und Feuer, directed by Heinz Thiel and Horst E. Brandt (TV film, East Germany, 1966, based on the novel of the same name)
- Zwei Briefe an Pospischiel, directed by Ralf Kirsten (TV film, East Germany, 1970, based on the novel of the same name)
- Zwei Briefe an Pospischiel, directed by Roland Gall (TV film, West Germany, 1971, based on the novel of the same name)
- Stellenweise Glatteis, directed by Wolfgang Petersen (TV film, West Germany, 1975, based on the novel of the same name)
- Die Vorstadtkrokodile, directed by Wolfgang Becker (TV film, West Germany, 1977, based on the novel Vorstadtkrokodile)
- Flächenbrand, directed by Alexander von Eschwege (TV film, West Germany, 1981, based on the novel of the same name)
- Friedrich und Friederike, directed by Alexander von Eschwege (TV series, 9 episodes, West Germany, 1988, based on the novel Friedrich und Friederike)
- The Crocodiles, directed by Christian Ditter (Germany, 2009, based on the novel Vorstadtkrokodile)
- The Crocodiles Strike Back, directed by Christian Ditter (Germany, 2010)
- The Crocodiles: All for One, directed by Christian Ditter (Germany, 2011)

=== Screenwriter ===
- Am Tresen, directed by Johann-Richard Hänsel (TV series, 14 episodes, West Germany, 1967–1968)
- Feierabend, directed by Hans Dieter Schwarze (TV film, West Germany, 1968)
- Schichtwechsel, directed by Hans Dieter Schwarze (TV film, West Germany, 1968)
- Aufstiegschancen, directed by Thomas Fantl (TV film, West Germany, 1971)
- Späte Liebe, directed by Ilse Hofmann (TV film, West Germany, 1978)
