= Alving =

Alving is a surname that can refer to:

- Barbro Alving (1909–1987), Swedish journalist writer, pacifist and feminist
- Carl Alving, American internist
- Fanny Alving (1874–1955), Swedish author
- Helen and Captain Alving, characters in Henrik Ibsen's play Ghosts
- Käte Alving (1896–1974), German actress

== See also ==
- Alvingham
- Alvington (disambiguation)
