= Hans Klering =

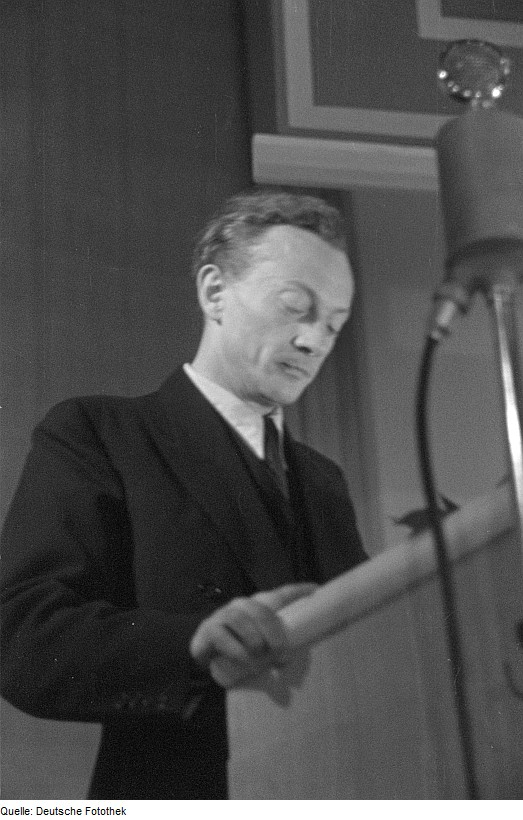
Hans Klering at the ceremony marking the founding of DEFA in 1946

Hans Karl Klering (8 November 1906 – 30 October 1988) was a German actor, director, voice actor, graphic designer and author. He joined the Communist Party and went into exile in the Soviet Union in 1931, returning to Germany in 1945. In 1946, he became a co-founder of DEFA, the East German state-owned film studio, as well as one of its directors and board members.

== Biographical details ==
Hans Klering was married to Else Korén and Antonia Nizkowskaja. Born in Berlin, he apprenticed himself from 1921 to 1924. However, he became unemployed at the end. Later, he worked on the docks as a sign painter. In 1926, he joined the Communist Party of Germany. He was a member of several agitprop theater groups in Cologne and Berlin, including the Rote Raketen (Red Rocket), Blaue Blusen (Blue Blouse), and the Left Column. As the political situation in Germany worsened, Klering fled to Moscow in 1931, where he continued to work with the Left Column. He was later arrested by the Soviet authorities as part of the so-called Hitler Youth Conspiracy.

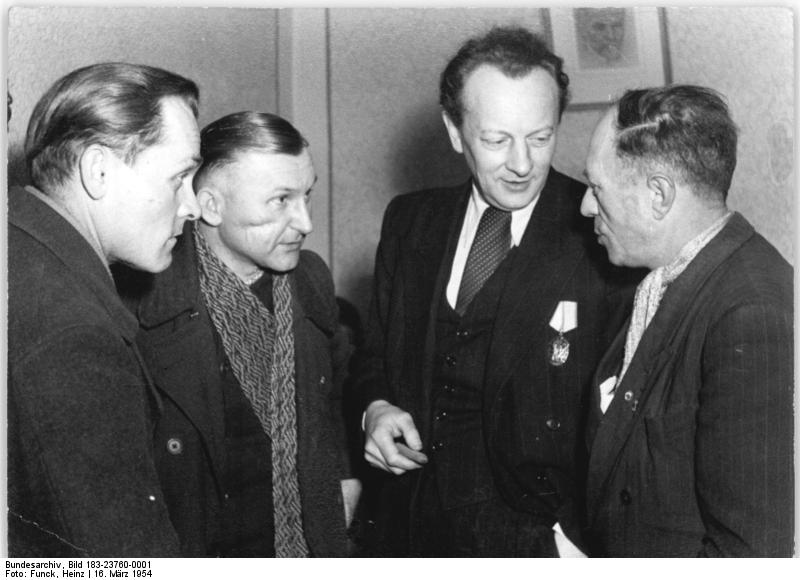
Hans Klering, 2nd from right, at a film festival, 1954

After the war, he returned to Germany in 1945. In 1946, he became one of the founders of the DEFA film studio. As a former graphic designer, Klering designed DEFA's logo. Until 1950, he was a director and member of its board of directors. After 1950, he played small roles in numerous DEFA films. In 1969, he played Mitch Chandler, a supporting role in the DEFA film Tödlicher Irrtum ("Deadly Error"), one of its "Indian films" produced as an East German version of West Germany's Karl May films. He was known for Wege übers Land (1968), Rauschende Melodien (1955), and The Rainbow (1944).

Klering died in East Berlin in 1988.

== Selected filmography ==
- Okraina (1933)
- Bogdan Khmelnitskiy (1941)
- The Unvanquished (1945)
- The Morgenrot Mine (1948)
- Street Acquaintances (1948)
- The Last Year (1951)
- The Call of the Sea (1951)
- Swelling Melodies (1955)
- Polonia-Express (1957)
- My Wife Makes Music (1958)
- The Dress (1961)
- Kein Ärger mit Cleopatra (1960)
- Reserviert für den Tod (1963)
- Hands Up, Or I'll Shoot (1966/2009)
- The Heathens of Kummerow (1967)
- Mohr und die Raben von London (1968)
- Husaren in Berlin (1971)
