= Hans-Uwe Bauer =

German actor

- Born: 26 August 1955 (age 70); Stralsund, East Germany
- Occupation: Actor
- Years active: 1979–present

Hans-Uwe Bauer (born 26 August 1955) is a German actor. He appeared in more than ninety films since 1979.

== Filmography ==
=== Film ===
| Year | Title | Role | Director(s) | Notes |
|---|---|---|---|---|
| 1979 | P.S. | Matti | Roland Gräf | |
| 1981 | Little Alexander | Werwolf Officer | Vladimir Fokin | |
| 1982 | Your Unknown Brother | Unknown | Ulrich Weiß | |
| 1982 | The Jolly Baker | Unknown | Helke Misselwitz | |
| 1983 | The Turning Point | Obergefreiter Karl-Heinz Fenske | Frank Beyer | |
| 1983 | The Airship | Student at Barricade | Rainer Simon | |
| 1983 | Fariaho | Magnus | Roland Gräf | |
| 1984 | Rublak: The Legend of a Surveyed Country | Son | Konrad Herrmann | |
| 1984 | Where Others Keep Silent | Fritz | Ralf Kirsten | |
| 1985 | The Woman and the Stranger | Confused Soldier | Rainer Simon | |
| 1986 | The Brigadier's Hat | Matzke | Horst E. Brandt | |
| 1987 | Five Women Against the Sea | Unknown | Vladislav Ikonomov | |
| 1988 | Jungle Time | Armin Bauer | Jörg Foth & Vu Tran | |
| 1989 | The Dancing Girl | Fritz Krüger | Masahiro Shinoda | |
| 1989 | The Ascent of Chimborazo | Georg Foster | Rainer Simon | |
| 1991 | Hidden Traps | Georg Rattey | Rainer Behrend | |
| 1991 | Trillertrine: Looking for Mozart | Unknown | Karl Heinz Lotz | |
| 1992 | Silent Country | Peter | Andreas Dresen | |
| 1992 | The Visitor | Violin Player | Dror Zahavi | |
| 1994 | Burning Life | Jürgen | Peter Welz | |
| 1995 | The Controller | Man in Chevrolet | Stefan Trampe | |
| 1999 | Sonnenallee | Herr Fromm (Neighbour) | Leander Haußmann | |
| 2001 | As Far as My Feet Will Carry Me | Leibrecht | Hardy Martins | |
| 2002 | Vaya con Dios | Tankwart | Zoltan Spirandelli | |
| 2003 | Good Bye, Lenin! | Dr. Mewes | Wolfgang Becker | |
| 2006 | Sarah Goes for a Walk | Unknown | Roberto Anjari-Rossi | Short film |
| 2006 | The Lives of Others | Paul Hauser | Florian Henckel von Donnersmarck | |
| 2007 | The Blind Spot | Markus Dietz | Tom Zenker | |
| 2007 | The Command | Torsten Schulz | Toby Bräuhauser | Short film |
| 2009 | My Beautiful Neighbour | Doctor | Peter Kahane | |
| 2010 | Friendship! | Falker | Markus Goller | |
| 2010 | Boxhagener Platz | Jochen Gundorff | Matti Geschonneck | |
| 2010 | Three | Dr. Wissmer | Tom Tykwer | |
| 2011 | The Blue of Heaven | Herr Baumanis (Marga's Father) | Hans Steinbichler | |
| 2011 | Westwind | Balisch | Robert Thalheim | |
| 2011 | 205 - Room of Fear | Herr Nadolny (Katrin's Father) | Rainer Matsutani | |
| 2011 | Hotel Desire | Unknown | Sergej Moya | Short film |
| 2012 | Shores of Hope | Ralf "Ralfi" Hellermann | Toke Constantin Hebbeln | |
| 2017 | The Young Karl Marx | Arnold Ruge | Raoul Peck | |
| 2018 | Never Look Away | Prof. Horst Grimma | Florian Henckel von Donnersmarck | |
| 2024 | Dying | | | |
