= Workers' Youth Theatre =

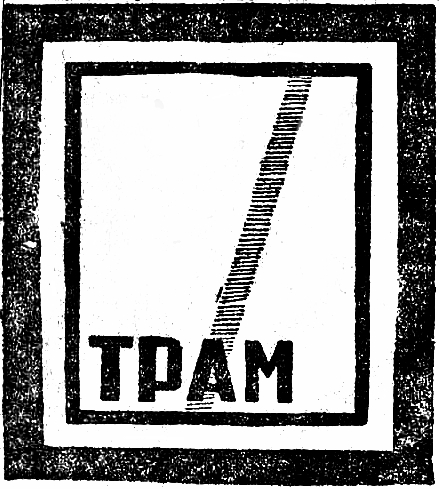
TRAM, 1928

Workers' Youth Theatre, also known as TRAM (the Russian acronym for "Teatr RAbochey Molodyozhi") was a Soviet proletarian youth theatre of the late 1920s and early 1930s. It was established by Mikhail Sokolovsky in a converted cinema on Liteiny Prospekt, Leningrad. The theatre was run as a collective and produced agitprop pieces designed to educate and persuade. The group worked together with the Left Column, a German agitprop group active in Berlin. A number of the group moved to Moscow in 1931. Helmut Damerius led the two groups from 1931 to 1933.

Adrian Piotrovsky was the theatre's principle ideologue, and Dmitri Shostakovich composed some incidental music for a number of its productions. By 1930 the theatre was under attack, accused of "formalism" by its critics from among journalists and rival proletarian organizations.

== See also ==
- Blue Blouse

== Sources ==
- Bradby, David, and John McCormick. 1978. People's Theatre. London: Croom Helm and Totowa, NJ: Rowman and Littlefield. ISBN 0-85664-501-X.
- Clark, Katerina. 1995. Petersburg: Crucible of Cultural Revolution. Cambridge: Harvard University Press, repr. 1998. ISBN 0-674-66336-5.
- Drain, Richard, ed. 1995. Twentieth-Century Theatre: A Sourcebook. London: Routledge. ISBN 0-415-09619-7.
- Frolova-Walker, Marina; Walker, Jonathan. Music and Soviet Power 1917-1932. Woodbridge: Boydell Press. ISBN 978-1-84383-703-9.
- McBurney, Gerard. 2008. "Shostakovich and the theatre" from The Cambridge Companion to Shostakovich ed. Pauline Fairclough and David Fanning. Cambridge: Cambridge University Press. ISBN 9781139827386.
- Rudnitsky, Konstantin. 1988. Russian and Soviet Theatre: Tradition and the Avant-Garde. Trans. Roxane Permar. Ed. Lesley Milne. London: Thames and Hudson. Rpt. as Russian and Soviet Theater, 1905-1932. New York: Abrams. ISBN 0-500-28195-5.
- Schechter, Joel, ed. 2003. Popular Theatre: A Sourcebook. Worlds of Performance Ser. London and New York: Routledge. ISBN 0-415-25830-8.
- Stourac, Richard, and Kathleen McCreery. 1986. Theatre as a Weapon: Workers' Theatre in the Soviet Union, Germany and Britain, 1917-1934. London and New York: Routledge. ISBN 0-7100-9770-0.
- Van Gysegheim, Andre. 1943. Theatre in Soviet Russia. London: Faber.
- Willett, John. 1978. Art and Politics in the Weimar Period: The New Sobriety 1917-1933. New York: Da Capo Press, 1996. ISBN 0-306-80724-6.
