= Harry Hindemith =

German actor

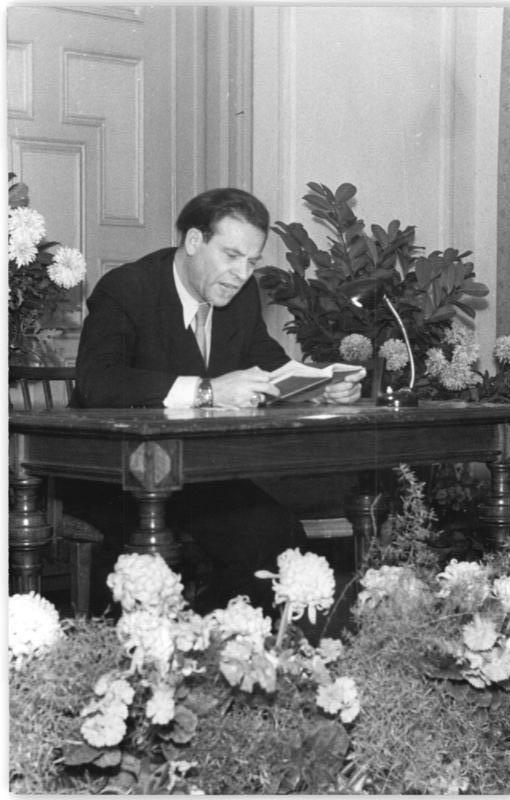
- Born: 16 June 1906; Brussels, Belgium
- Died: 21 January 1973 (aged 66); East Berlin, East Germany
- Occupation: Actor
- Years active: 1944–1973

Harry Hindemith (16 June 1906 – 21 January 1973) was a German actor. He appeared in more than eighty films from 1944 to 1973.

== Filmography ==
Year	Title	Role	Notes
1944	Junge Adler		
1946	Somewhere in Berlin	Paul Iller	
1948	Street Acquaintances	Herbert Petzoldt	
1948	Und wieder 48	Schneegandt	
1949	Quartet of Five	Stefan Winkler	
1949	Our Daily Bread	Ernst Webers	
1950	Hoegler's Mission	Krantz	
1950	The Benthin Family	Seidel	
1952	Story of a Young Couple	Burmeister	
1952	Sein großer Sieg	Lahmann	
1953	Anna Susanna	Emil	
1953	Die Unbesiegbaren		
1953	Swings or Roundabouts	Steiger	
1956	Drei Mädchen im Endspiel	Otto Hollmann	
1956	Der Teufelskreis	Walter Rottstock	
1956	Genesung	Staatsanwalt	
1956	Mich dürstet	Taga	
1957	Castles and Cottages	Kalle	
1957	Bärenburger Schnurre	Hansels Vater	
1957	Der Fackelträger	Dr. Hartmann	
1958	Tatort Berlin	Erwin Beier	
1958	Les Misérables	Le bagnard Cochepaille	
1958	Sie kannten sich alle	Böhnke	
1958	Der Lotterieschwede	Bergendahl	
1958	Die Feststellung	Der unrasierte Bauer	
1959	SAS 181 Does Not Reply		
1960	Always on Duty	Marian Klein	
1960	Einer von uns		
1960	Hatifa	Simsal	
1960	Schritt für Schritt	Oberstleutnant Bremer	
1960	Die heute über 40 sind		
1961	Die Liebe und der Co-Pilot	Hanke	
1961	Der Fremde	Wilhelm	
1961	Italienisches Capriccio		
1961	Snow White	Royal Huntsman	
1961	Kuttel	Lehrer	
1962	At A French Fireside	Bourguignon	
1962-1966	The Heyde-Sawade Affair	Dr. Buresch	3 episodes
1964	Die Hochzeit von Länneken	Johannes Grabe	
1964	Als Martin vierzehn war	Vogt Kreutzer	
1965	Lots Weib	Richter	
1965	Solange Leben in mir ist	von Hohenberg	
1965	Die besten Jahre	Meister	
1965	Denk bloß nicht, ich heule	Herr Naumann	
1967	Bread and Roses	Paul Kallam	
1967	The Banner of Krivoi Rog	Bürgermeister Zonkel	
1970	Meine Stunde Null	Scheffler	
1972	Trotz alledem!		
1972	Chyornye sukhari		
