= Günther Simon =

German actor (1925–1972)

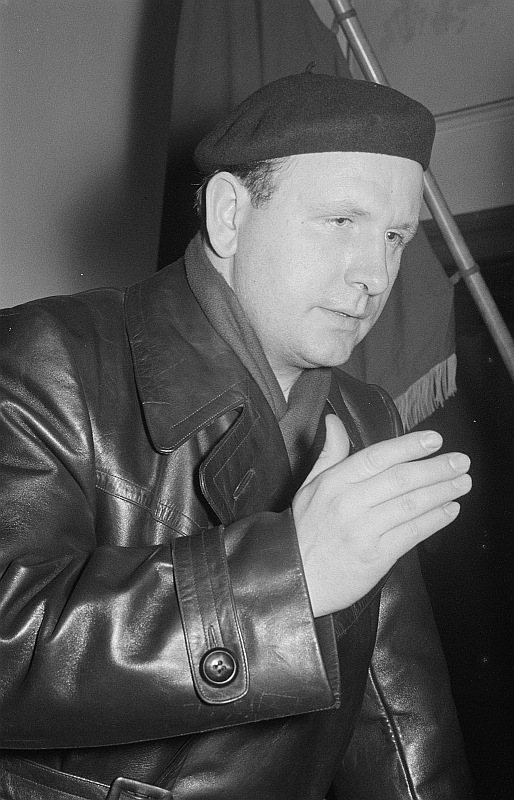
- Born: 11 May 1925; Berlin, Germany
- Died: 25 June 1972 (aged 47); East Berlin, East Germany
- Occupation: Actor
- Years active: 1948–1972
- Political party: SED

Günther Simon (11 May 1925 – 25 June 1972) was an East German actor.

== Biography ==
=== Early life ===
A bank clerk's son, Simon attended an acting school already in Gymnasium. At the age of 16, he was sent to a premilitary training camp of the Hitler Youth and then drafted to the Reich Labour Service. He volunteered to join the paratroopers in August 1943. He was captured by American troops near Normandy and shipped to a POW camp in Colorado, where he acted in the camp's makeshift theater.

=== Breakthrough ===
After returning home in 1947, Simon took private acting lessons with Karl Meixner in the Hebbel Theater in Berlin. He made his debut on stage in the Municipal Theater of Köthen in 1948, in a production of Dmitry Scheglov's The Storm. He then moved to the Schwerin Theater, in which he remained until 1950; there, he met his wife Margarita, who was employed as a dancer. Afterwards, Simon joined the cast of the Dresden Theater. In late 1951, he left it in favour of the Leipzig Theater, where he remained for only a short period.

=== Summit ===
Simon was cast for one of the leading roles in the 1952 film The Condemned Village, and since then was active mainly in cinema. At the same year, in spite of his inexperience, he was chosen to portray Ernst Thälmann in Kurt Maetzig's two-part propaganda epic about the communist leader's life. The picture was watched by millions and entered the East German schools' curriculum. Simon received the National Prize first class for his work on the first part, and the Best Actor Award in the 1956 Karlovy Vary International Film Festival for his appearance in the second. He joined the country's Socialist Unity Party of Germany (SED / Sozialistische Einheitspartei Deutschlands) in 1954 and became a member of the DEFA Studio's management.

Simon appeared in some 30 pictures throughout the years. In 1956, he was awarded the Heinrich Greif Prize second class. He won the National Prize once more, in 1968, for his portrayal of Krause in the television miniseries Krause and Krupp, and received the Art Prize of the Free German Trade Union Federation thrice, in 1967, 1968, and 1971. He had three sons and one daughter, and is buried in the Dorotheenstadt cemetery.

== Partial filmography ==
- Das verurteilte Dorf (1952) – Heinz Weimann
- Anna Susanna (1953) – Orje
- Swings Or Roundabouts (1953) – Ernst
- Ernst Thälmann (1954–1955, part 1, 2) – Ernst Thälmann
- Drei Mädchen im Endspiel (1956)
- Das Traumschiff (1956) – Kapitän Franz Müller
- Treffpunkt Aimée (1956) – Wendt
- Damals in Paris (1956) – Georges
- Tinko (1957) – Ernst Kraske
- Don't Forget My Little Traudel (1957) – The Peoples'-Police Commissar
- Sheriff Teddy (1957) – Lehrer Freitag
- My Wife Makes Music (1958) – Gustl Wagner
- Cerný prapor (1958) – Gerhardt
- Der Lotterieschwede (1958) – Arzt
- The Sailor's Song (1958) – Erich Steigert
- Geschwader Fledermaus (1958) – Tex Stankowsky
- Sun Seekers (1958) – Franz Beier
- Der kleine Kuno (1959) – Verkehrspolizist
- Senta auf Abwegen (1959) – Max Matuschek
- Eine alte Liebe (1959) – 1. Sekretär der SED-Kreiparteileitung
- First Spaceship on Venus (1960) – Deutscher Pilot / Robert / Raimund Brinkmann
- Einer von uns (1960) – Richard Bertram
- Die heute über 40 sind (1960) – Vertreter des NKFD
- Kein Ärger mit Cleopatra (1960) – LPG-Vorsitzender
- Der Moorhund (1960) – Oberleutnant Suter
- Die Liebe und der Co-Pilot (1961) – Richard Wagner
- Der Fremde (1961) – Reichert
- Der Traum des Hauptmann Loy (1961) – First Lt. Phil A. Rodney
- Der Tod hat ein Gesicht (1961) – Dr. Cramm
- Eine Handvoll Noten (1961) – Paul Steinmetz
- The Dress (1961) – Fleischer
- Ärzte (1961) – Dr. Brehm
- Mord ohne Sühne (1962) – Heinz Lippert
- An französischen Kaminen (1962) – General Rucker
- Nebel (1963) – Verteidiger
- At A French Fireside (1963) – SS-Gruppenführer Upitz
- Schwarzer Samt (1964) – Manfred Sibelka
- Preludio 11 (1964) – Palomino
- Das Lied vom Trompeter (1964) – Ernst Thälmann
- Der Reserveheld (1965) – Genosse Oberst
- Lots Weib (1965) – Richard Lot
- Der Frühling braucht Zeit (1965) – Erhard Faber
- Alfons Zitterbacke (1966) – Vater Zitterbacke
- Reise ins Ehebett (1966) – Kapitän
- Bread and Roses (1967) – Georg Landau
- Heroin (1968) – Zollkommissar Zinn
- Verdacht auf einen Toten (1969) – Major Klausnitzer
- Weil ich dich liebe (1970) – Paul Wienecke
- KLK Calling PTZ – The Red Orchestra (1971) – John Sieg
- Nakovalnya ili chuk (1972) – Pfarrer
- Ripe Cherry (1973) – Helmut Kamp
- Wenn du groß bist, lieber Adam (1990) – Minister (final film role)
