= Irrlicht und Feuer =

1963 novel by Max von der Grün

- Author: Max von der Grün
- Language: German
- Publisher: Paulus Verlag
- Publication date: 1963
- Publication place: West Germany
- Pages: 302

Irrlicht und Feuer (lit. 'Will-o'-the-wisp and Fire') is a 1963 novel by the German writer Max von der Grün. It portrays a few months in the life of a miner at the coal mine Zeche Königsborn in the Ruhr area during the coal crisis. It was published by Paulus Verlag in Recklinghausen.

It was Grün's second novel and became his breakthrough. It caused controversy due to its portrayal of the working conditions for miners, which was based on the experiences of the author and his colleagues. The Union of Mining and Energy publicly distanced itself from Grün. The novel was a success in East Germany where it was published by Aufbau Verlag.

DEFA adapted it into the 1966 two-part television film Irrlicht und Feuer directed by Heinz Thiel and Horst E. Brandt. It was the first time a West German novel was adapted into an East German film. It was broadcast in West Germany by Südwestfunk in 1968. The broadcast renewed the previous discussions.
