= Fred Düren =

German actor (1928–2015)

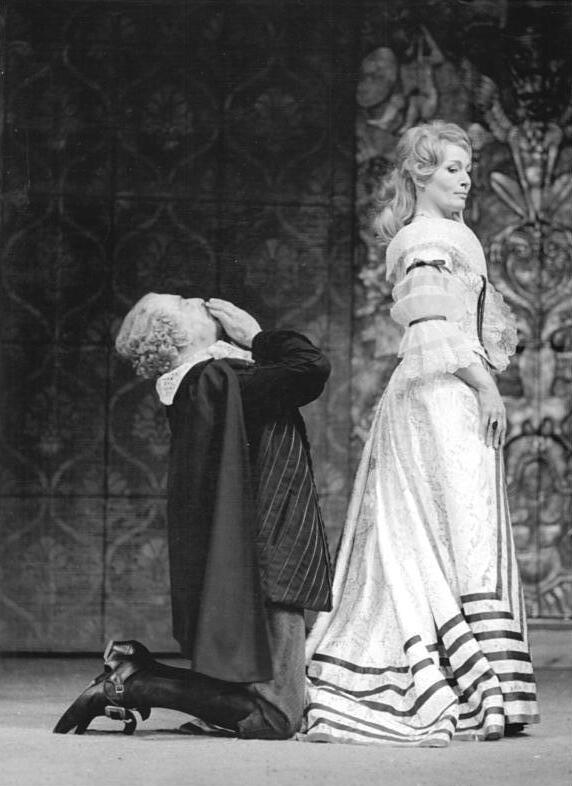
- Düren and Inge Keller onstage in East Berlin in 1963.
- Born: 2 December 1928; Berlin, Germany
- Died: 2 March 2015 (aged 86); Jerusalem, Israel
- Occupation: Actor
- Years active: 1954–1991 (film)

Fred Düren (1928–2015) was a German stage, film and television actor. His career was spent in East Germany, where he appeared in several DEFA films including the historical adventure Follow Me, Scoundrels (1964). He was married to the actress Irmgard Düren. In 1988 he converted to Judaism and settled in Israel, where he died in 2015.

== Filmography ==
Year	Title	Role	Notes
1957	Spielbank-Affäre	Reporter	
1957	Sheriff Teddy	Konsumpacker	
1958	Die Mutter	Pawel Wlassow	
1958	The Sailor's Song	Major Mörs	
1958	Tilman Riemenschneider		
1959	Sie nannten ihn Amigo	Pepp	
1960	Hatifa	Zadok	
1960	Was wäre, wenn...?		
1960	Five Cartridges		
1960	Prezil jsem svou smrt	Georg	
1961	Italienisches Capriccio		
1961	Der Traum des Hauptmann Loy	Rex Nartin	
1961	Guten Tag, lieber Tag		
1962	Minna von Barnhelm	Riccaut	
1964	Preludio 11	Pater Leon	Voice
1964	Follow Me, Scoundrels	Leutnant Lübbenau	
1964	Der fliegende Holländer	Der Holländer	
1968	Schüsse unterm Galgen	Bauer Scott	
1970	Netzwerk	Peter Ragosch	
1971	Der verlorene Engel	Ernst Barlach	
1971	Goya or the Hard Way to Enlightenment	Esteve	
1973	Die Elixiere des Teufels	Belcampo	
1974	Orpheus in der Unterwelt	John Styx	
1978	Fleur Lafontaine	Eberhard Lafontaine	
1980	Solo Sunny	Doktor	
1980	Levins Mühle	Prediger Feller	
1983	The Turning Point	General Eisensteck	
1985	Grünstein's Clever Move	Grünstein	
1986	Käthe Kollwitz	Karl Kollwitz	

== Bibliography ==
- Goble, Alan. The Complete Index to Literary Sources in Film. Walter de Gruyter, 1999.
