= Gerberding =

Gerberding is a surname. Notable people by that name include:

- Julie Gerberding (born 1955), American infectious disease expert.
- William P. Gerberding (1929–2014), American educator.
- Richard Gerberding, professor emeritus University of Alabama.
- Erich Gerberding (1921–1986), German actor.
