= Helmut Damerius =

Helmut Damerius

Helmut Damerius (16 December 1905 – 29 September 1985) was a German communist, theatre director, writer and the founding member of the Left Column, an agitprop theater group. As the Nazi Party gained in strength, he went into exile in Moscow, only to be arrested in the so-called Hitler Youth Conspiracy and sentenced to a long term in a Soviet prison. After his prison sentence, he was banished to Kazakhstan and was not permitted to move elsewhere. In 1956, he received permission to move to East Germany, where he stayed until his death.

== Early years ==
Damerius was born and raised in Berlin-Wedding. His mother was a florist and his father a gardener. After attending a volksschule, he apprenticed at a florist. He then worked at an upholstery workshop, working first as an errand boy and other jobs, and from 1924 to 1929, as a painter. He began getting interested in politics through involvement with the Lankwitz Friends of Nature. In 1922, already an actor, he married Emma Zadach and joined the Anarcho-Syndicalist Youth of Germany, a political party that was in existence from 1920 to 1933.

In 1924, Damerius joined the Communist Party (German: Kommunistische Partei Deutschlands, or KPD) and he and his wife had a baby, who died as a small child. They were divorced in 1927. In 1928, he was a member of the agitprop theater group Rote Blusen, led by Arthur Pieck. In 1929, he was a founding member of the Left Column and became its leader. The troupe worked in support of the Workers International Relief (WIR). Their advertising efforts for the WIR resulted in 16,000 new members for the WIR, which then rewarded the Left Column with a five-week tour in the Soviet Union. Damerius took this opportunity to emigrate to the Soviet Union.

== Middle years in the USSR ==
He began studying at the State Institute for Theater Arts in Moscow and he applied for citizenship in the Soviet Union. The Left Column returned to Germany, but discovered that they were prohibited from performing, so they returned to the Soviet Union, where they worked with the Workers' Youth Theatre, also known as "TRAM". Damerius led them both until 1933. In 1933, the Left Column joined with another agitprop theater group, "Troupe 31", forming the German Left Column Theater under the direction of Gustav von Wangenheim From 1934 to 1935, he studied at the Communist University for National Minorities. In 1935, Damerius acted with troupe member Bruno Schmidtsdorf in Wangenheim's anti-Nazi film, released in the United States in 1936 as Der Kampf. He received his Soviet citizenship in 1935 and transferred to the State Institute for Theater Arts in Moscow, where he studied drama direction. He also consulted at the Mezhrabpom Film Studio and staged productions at the German Collectivists' Theater in Odessa. From 1936 to 1938, he was secretly employed by the Moscow NKVD, where he was known as "Dojno".

=== Arrest and confinement ===
On 17 March 1938 he was arrested by the Soviet secret police, the NKVD, on suspicion of having been involved with the Hitler Youth Conspiracy and was expelled from the KPD. He was held at Lubyanka Prison in a severely overcrowded cell and subjected to interrogations. His interrogators subjected him to verbal abuse and urged him to confess to the charge that he was a recruiter for Hitler Youth. He didn't fight back against the interrogator's abuse because he expected that the interrogator would simply get help. He was afraid "that they could kill the communist in me", as he later wrote.

Damerius was charged with "suspicion of espionage" and, in October 1938, was sentenced to seven years in a Siberian gulag. He was sent to Solikamsk ITL, a newly opened labor camp housing up to 37,200 people in the Taiga, where he was made to do hard labor such as cutting down trees, and he suffered from hunger, exhaustion and the cold. In 1945, he was accused of "counter-revolutionary agitation" and was sentenced to five years in a forced labor camp, where he was put in a vermin-infested cell and given rations of 300 grams of black bread and a single ladle of thin soup. When interrogated, however, he refused to sign false statements. Under the belief that the Communist Party leadership knew nothing about the gulags, he wrote to Joseph Stalin 17 times over the course of his internment, never once receiving a reply. Damerius later called himself "naive".

In 1947, his second conviction was reviewed and commuted to banishment to a "free settlement" in Kazakhstan, where he was not permitted to travel within the Soviet Union, much less abroad. In 1948, Damerius learned that his ex-wife would be heading a delegation to the Soviet Union. He sent her a telegram, in hopes she could help him. He received a reply, but he was not allowed to travel to the GDR, nor to leave Kazakhstan.

=== Rehabilitation ===
Despite all my personal unhappiness, my trust in Soviet power and in the party and in Stalin who embodied both could not be shaken. [...] I was so naive... apparently there is nothing more difficult or horrible in life than to wake up from dreams that one imagined to be reality.

— Helmut Damerius, Unter Falscher Anschuldigung

In 1955, he managed to contact his old friend, the actor Arthur Pieck, whose father, Wilhelm Pieck, was the general secretary of the Central Committee of the Socialist Unity Party (SED). Arthur Pieck's intervention led to a military review of Damerius' case. The NKVD officer who had been in charge of the original investigation of Damerius in 1938 was interrogated. The officer, Nikolai Mitrofanov, denied beating Damerius and even refused to acknowledge that the NKVD had ever practiced torture. He claimed that Damerius had incriminated himself because other prisoners who had been in custody longer had told him that this would expedite his case.

Damerius was rehabilitated in May 1955. The reversal read, "By decision of the Moscow Military District War Tribunal, 22 September 1955, the verdict of 1938 is overturned and Helmut Damerius is reinstated of all rights. The testimony by Wanda Bronskaya that Helmut Damerius wanted to recruit her for the Hitler Youth was fabricated." (Note: Wanda Bronskaya was from a family that had lived in Germany as Soviet diplomats. She had met Damerius in Berlin in 1925–26, with the communist youth in Berlin-Steglitz. Back in the Soviet Union after 1933, she was arrested and named Damerius during an interrogation.) He returned to working in theater, becoming the director of the Decorations Department of the Jambyl theater in 1955.

In 1956, Damerius was allowed to leave the Soviet Union for the German Democratic Republic (GDR), but was warned not to speak or write of his experiences in the Soviet Union, under strict threat of punishment.

== Final years in the GDR ==
After Damerius' return to the GDR, he became the head of the Concert and Guest Performance Direction, serving in that capacity from 1956 to 1960. From 1960 to 1961, he was the first director of the Artists' Agency, established to oversee and grant permission for East German artists to perform abroad and foreign artists to perform in East Germany. In 1960, he became head of the State Folk Art Ensemble in Berlin, retiring in 1963. From 1980 to 1982, he secretly worked on his memoirs, writing about the "years of his pointless arrest, the loss of the middle years of his life". He secretly gave his complete manuscript to Professor Werner Mittenzwei in 1982.

Damerius died in East Berlin. His memoir, Unter Falscher Anschuldigung ("Under False Accusation"), was released posthumously in 1990.

== Awards and honors ==
In his later years, Damerius was awarded several East German medals and honors. In 1963, Damerius received the Medal for Fighters against Fascism, in 1973, he received an award for 50 years of allegiance to the SED from its Central Committee; in 1975, he was awarded the Patriotic Order of Merit; and in 1980, he received the art award of the Free German Trade Union Federation.

== Publications ==
- "Kolonne Links" in: Das Rote Sprachrohr Berlin (1929 - 1931) (in German)
- "Kolonne Links" in: Lieder der Agitprop-Truppen vor 1945. Das Lied im Kampf geboren. Leipzig (1960) (in German)
- Über Zehn Meere zum Mittelpunkt der Welt, Berlin (1977) (in German)
- "Neun Kapitel über Lebenslauf und Geschichtsverlauf", with an introduction by Werner Mittenzwei in: Sinn u. Form 41 (1989) 6 (in German)
- Unter falscher Anschuldigung – 18 Jahre in Taiga und Steppe, Aufbau-Verlag, Berlin and Weimar (1990). ISBN 3-351-01776-6 (Published posthumously.) (in German)

== Sources ==
- Catherine Epstein, The Last Revolutionaries: German Communists and Their Century, President and Fellows of Harvard College (2003), ISBN 0-674-01045-0
