= Special Mission =

Special Mission may refer to:

- Special Mission (1959 film), an East German black-and-white film
- Special Mission (1946 film), a French thriller film
