= Schwarzer Samt =

Black Velvet
- German: Schwarzer Samt
- Directed by: Heinz Thiel
- Written by: Gerhard Bengsch and Joachim Plötner
- Produced by: DEFA, KAG „Heinrich Greif“
- Starring: Fred Delmare; Günther Simon; Christa Gottschalk; Christine Laszar; Georg-Michael Wagner
- Cinematography: Horst E. Brandt
- Edited by: Anneliese Hinze-Sokolow
- Music by: Helmut Nier
- Distributed by: DEFA
- Release date: 1964
- Running time: 80 minutes
- Language: German
- Budget: N/A

Schwarzer Samt (English: Black Velvet) is a German crime film by Heinz Thiel produced by the DEFA in 1964.

== Plot summary ==
The State Security Service detains the photographer Gwendoleit, who as a courier was supposed to bring counterfeited documents and number plates to Leipzig and to work on a photo assignment. Because the State Security Service neither knows with whom Gwendoleit wants to meet in Leipzig, nor what the photo subject was, the security agent Alexander Berg assumes the identity of Gwendoleit, although he had planned a trip to Oberhof for his winter holidays.

In Leipzig Helma Sibelka appears and hands over a deposit for the passports and the number plates to Alexander. Berg refuses to hand over the passports before the full amount is paid. Helma goes to see her husband, the engineer Manfred, in the guesthouse, where she finds him with the secretary Vera Gorm. Manfred has long given up on their marriage and is planning a future without his wife.

Operating out of the Hotel Astoria, Berg has few clues as to what this entire case is actually about. In a few days the Leipzig Trade Fair will start. He receives an encrypted letter signed by a certain "Dora", asking him to remind his "business partner" of the pending delivery of a consignment of "black velvet". Soon it becomes clear that the person posing as "Dora" is a certain Dr. Oranke. The security agents come to the conclusion that "Black velvet" is code for a snapshot to be taken by Gwendoleit. Manfred instructs Berg to take the snapshot from a window in his study which affords an unobstructed view of a highly innovative remote-controlled crane erected for the trade fair. Crane operator Manfred manipulates the machine, so that the monitors break down and the test run becomes a disaster. Berg captures the failed demonstration with his camera. Now the investigators see through the conspiracy: Hamburg-based Dr. Oranke had offered Manfred a job in West Germany. However, this job offer came with the condition that Manfred was to sabotage his company's crane demonstration at the trade fair, thereby harming the international reputation of the GDR. However, the investigators decide to play for time because they want to find out who Manfred wants to take with him on the second passport he has requested. A short while later Berg finds Manfred battered to death.

He is instructed by an unknown person to come to Manfred's office. Here he meets Vera Gorm, who in reality is one of the masterminds of the operation. She reveals to Alexander that Manfred was actually supposed to destabilize the crane using acid, leading to its total collapse on the opening day of the trade fair. When he got cold feet, she killed him. The acid was being transported in a box with the inscription "Black Velvet". Vera Gorm becomes suspicious of Berg because he is obviously not aware of all the facts that Gwendoleit would be supposed to know. She orders an accomplice to confine Berg in the basement, while she is going to destroy the crane with acid. Here she is detained by Alexander's men and Alexander himself, who was able to incapacitate her accomplice. The case is solved.

Soon after Alexander is sitting in the train to Oberhof. A female passenger is spraying on perfume - the brand is "Black Velvet".

== Production ==
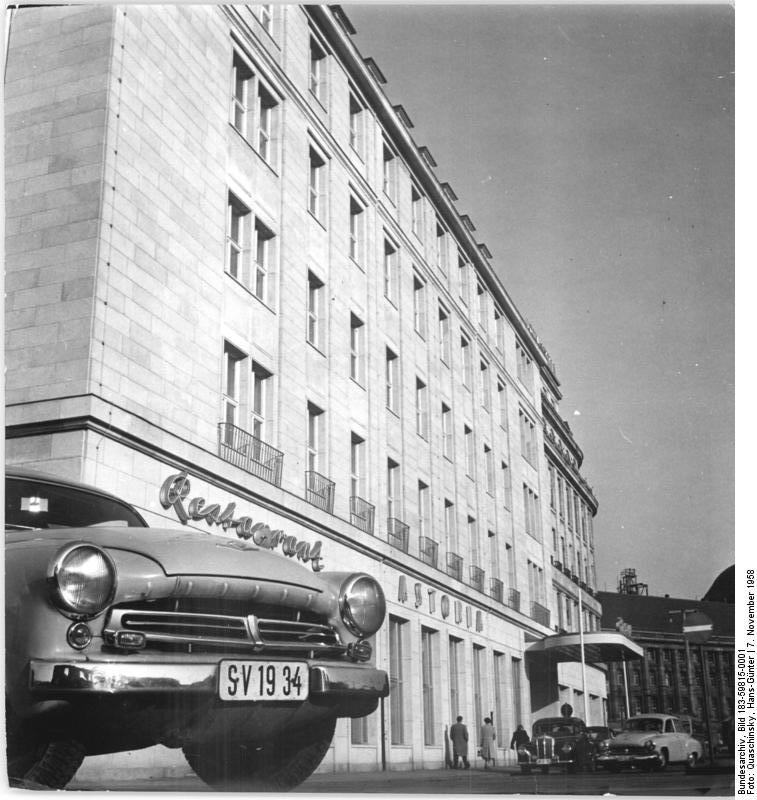
The Hotel Astoria, in the film it is the domicile of Alexander during the investigations

Schwarzer Samt was shot in 1963 in and around Leipzig. Filming locations include the Hotel Astoria, where Alexander Berg stayed during his investigations, and the Monument to the Battle of the Nations, where the meeting of Alexander and Manfred was filmed.

On 27 February 1964 the film premiered at Kino Babylon in Berlin. The script is based on themes of the novel Der scharlachrote Domino (The Scarlet Red Domino) by Fred Unger.

== Cast ==
- Erich Gerberding: Captain Jensen
- Rudolf Ulrich: Lieutenant Wohlfahrt
- Fred Delmare: Alexander Berg
- Günther Simon: Manfred Sibelka
- Christa Gottschalk: Helma Sibelka
- Christine Laszar: Vera Gorm
- Herbert Köfer: Doctor Kosel
- Christoph Engel: Pitt Steffens
- Vera Oelschlegel: Karin Sommer
- Hans Lucke: Stasi staff
- Manfred Zetzsche: Stasi staff
- Rolf Ripperger: Stasi staff
- Trude Bechmann: Misses Igelfink
- Georg-Michael Wagner: Gwendoleit
- Winfried Wagner: Archenbeau
- Werner Godemann: Monument janitor
- Hans Maikowski: Hartwig
- Sigmar Schramm: Schrön
- Ernst Balke: police councillor
- Klaus Fiedler: hotel boy

== Critical reviews ==
Contemporary critics gave negative ratings for the film. "In favour of external tension sometimes internal logic is lacking; with an overly complicated setup of their plans the agents seem to put obstacles in their own way", a critic judged. Renate Holland-Moritz criticized, that in the film yet another time "a superman is served, who solves the difficult case almost in solo action."

film-dienst states Schwarzer Samt to be "exciting entertainment, that satirizes the James Bond mythos within the limits of possibilities."

== Literature ==
- Schwarzer Samt. In: Frank-Burkhard Habel: Das große Lexikon der DEFA-Spielfilme. Schwarzkopf & Schwarzkopf, Berlin 2000, ISBN 3-89602-349-7, pg. 523–524.
