= Woytowicz =

Woytowicz is a Polish surname. It may refer to:

- Bolesław Woytowicz (1899–1980), Polish classical pianist, composer, and teacher
- Monika Woytowicz (born 1944), German actress
- Stefania Woytowicz (1922–2005), Polish operatic soprano
