= Goya or the Hard Way to Enlightenment =

1971 East German film

- Film poster
- Directed by: Konrad Wolf
- Written by: Lion Feuchtwanger (novel); Angel Vagenshtain; Konrad Wolf
- Starring: Donatas Banionis; Olivera Katarina; Fred Düren; Tatyana Lolova; Rolf Hoppe
- Music by: Faradzh Karayev; Kara Karayev
- Release date: 17 September 1971
- Running time: 136 minutes
- Countries: East Germany; Soviet Union
- Languages: German; Russian

Goya or the Hard Way to Enlightenment (German: Goya – oder der arge Weg der Erkenntnis) is a 1971 East German drama film directed by Konrad Wolf. It was entered into the 7th Moscow International Film Festival where it won a Special Prize. It is based on a novel with the same title by Lion Feuchtwanger.

== Plot ==
The painter Francisco de Goya has achieved reputation and prosperity through his talent and creative prowess. His clients come from the most important houses in Madrid and so he gradually comes to the royal court of Charles IV. He is passionately drawn to the Duchess Alba and at the same time hates the decadent aristocrat in her. He believes in the king and the church, enjoying his position at court. His colleague and friend Esteve shows him the contradictions of this closed world and leads him to the simple people of the country. In a Madrid tavern he meets the singer Maria Rosario; later he has to see her being condemned by the Inquisition. He is deeply shocked by the song that Maria has to recite as proof of her guilt. The further he penetrates into the life of the people, drawing motifs for his art from it, the greater his inner pain becomes in view of the conditions in the country. His relationship with Alba leads to self-destructive behaviour and so he suffers a sudden hearing loss. He turns his back on the farm and travels completely deaf to his mother's home in Aragon. With the help of his companion Esteve, he finds his way back to his work, which leads him to an inner turning away from the values of society and the church. He is plagued by demons whom he recognizes in their deeds and their social influence and which flow into his work. He himself falls into the clutches of the Inquisition; the Grand Inquisitor implores him to refuse this idea. But Goya is firmly established in the belief that the misery and horror arise from the circumstances themselves and remains convinced of the truth of his pictures. He chooses exile.

1808 in Madrid, an uprising of residents against the occupation of the by French troops was brutally suppressed. Struck by what he saw, Goya proceeded to create a cycle of etchings The Disasters of War.

== Cast ==
- Donatas Banionis as Francisco Goya
- Olivera Katarina as The Duchess of Alba
- Fred Düren as Esteve
- Tatyana Lolova as Queen Maria Luisa
- Rolf Hoppe as Charles IV of Spain
- Mieczyslaw Voit as Grand Inquisitor
- Mikhail Kozakov as Gilmarde
- Arno Wyzniewski as Quintana
- Lyudmila Chursina as Pepa
- Veriko Andjaparidze as Mother
- Ariadna Shengelaya as Josefa
- Gustaw Holoubek as Bermudez
- Wolfgang Kieling as Manuel Godoy
