= Abenteuer in Bamsdorf =

1958 film

- Directed by: Konrad Petzold
- Written by: Konrad Petzold
- Starring: Charlotte Küter
- Release date: 4 April 1958
- Running time: 60 minutes
- Country: East Germany
- Language: German

Abenteuer in Bamsdorf is an East German adventure film directed and written by Konrad Petzold. starring Charlotte Küte, Bernd Kuss, Peter Schmidt. It was released in 1958.

== Cast ==
- Charlotte Küter as Oma
- Bernd Kuss as Toni
- Peter Schmidt as Klaus
- Petra Kyburg as Rita
- Klaus Böhme as Rolf
- Günter Wolf as Stippel
- Hans-Joachim Pfeil as Michel
- Sylvia Hunger as Bärbel
- Claudia Seidel as Reni
