= Skimeister von morgen =

1957 film

- Directed by: Ralf Kirsten
- Release date: 1957
- Country: East Germany
- Language: German

Skimeister von morgen is an East German film. It was released in 1957.
