= Jan Petersen (writer) =

German writer (1906–1969)

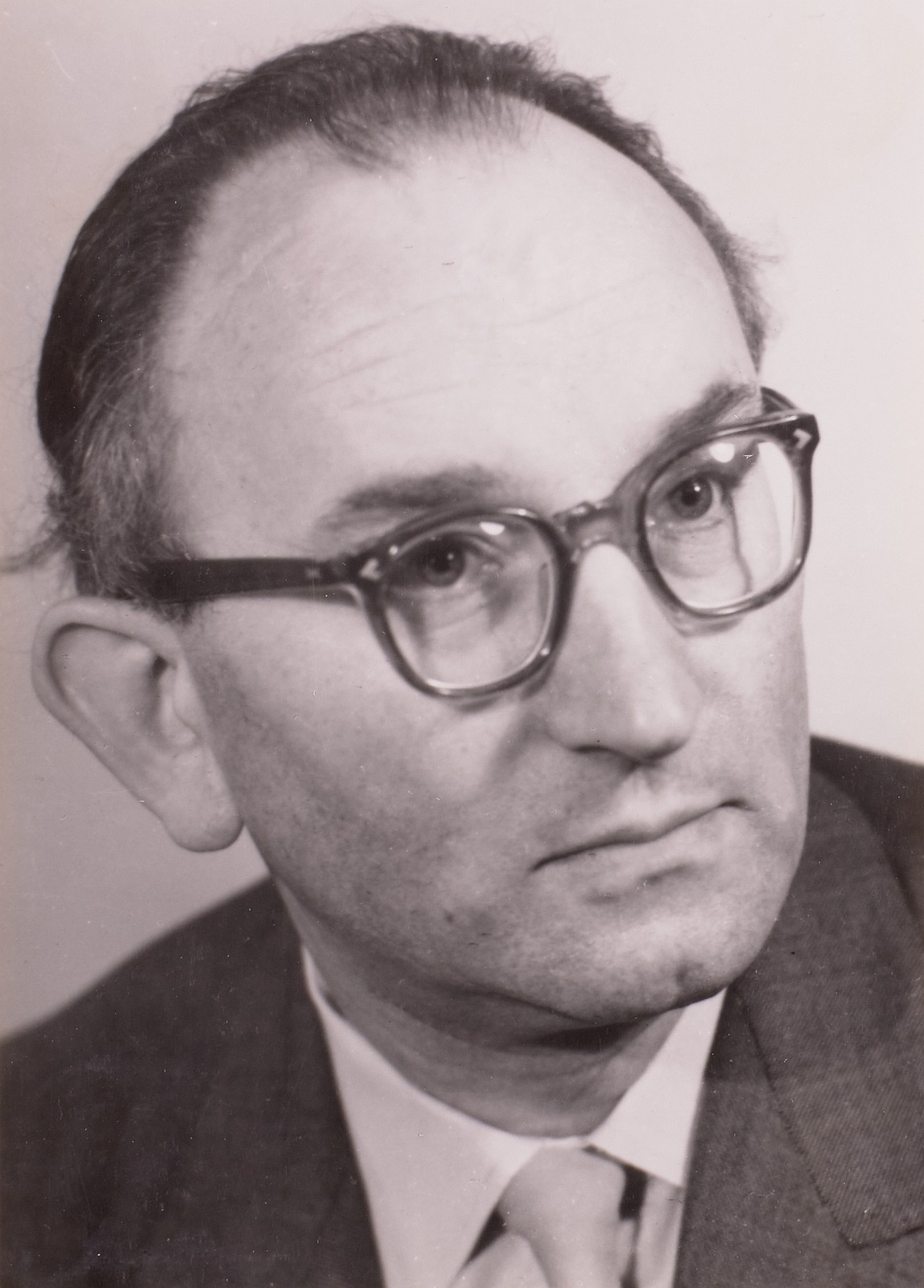
- Portrait of Petersen taken during the IV German Writers' Congress in 1956
- Born: Hans Otto Schwalm; 2 July 1906; Berlin, Kingdom of Prussia, German Empire
- Died: 11 November 1969 (aged 63); East Berlin, East Germany
- Resting place: Müggelheim
- Occupations: Lathe operator, toolmaker, and writer
- Children: Bienchen Ohly
- Writing career
- Notable awards: Patriotic Order of Merit (1958); National Prize of the German Democratic Republic (1959)

Jan Petersen (German pronunciation: [jaːn ˈpeːtɐzn̩]; 2 July 1906 – 11 November 1969) was a German writer who was a member of the Communist Party of Germany (KPD), a leader of the Association of Proletarian-Revolutionary Authors (BPRS), and a participant in the German resistance to Nazism who recorded daily life during the Gleichschaltung.

== Biography ==
=== Early years ===
Petersen was born Hans Otto Schwalm to a working-class family in Berlin, Germany. As a teenage boy, he started working as a skilled labourer, and became a member of the Young Communist League of Germany (KJVD) before joining the KPD.

=== Nazi Germany and Our Street ===
In 1928 the KPD established the BPRS and Petersen took the role of its leading the organisation in Berlin. With the Nazi party's takeover of the German state in the early 1930's, Petersen began to clandestinely record the Gleichschaltung as it happened in his Kiez. This became the manuscript for the book Our Street (German: Unsere Straẞe) which was written over the course of 1933-4. Petersen typed the majority of the book in a room he rented in Charlottenburg, while other sections were produced in Oranienburg. In total, he made three copies of the manuscript.

Our Street is an account of the Kiez around the Wallstraẞe (today Zillestraße), which was a working-class street and communist stronghold in Charlottenburg, novelised in order to protect its protagonist's identities. The memoir was written in the style of contemporary German Marxist street fighting novels. In 1934, Petersen smuggled a copy of the manuscript out of Germany by baking it inside a cake and transporting it across the Czechoslovak border.

=== Exile ===
In 1935 Petersen attended the First International Writers’ Congress for the Defence of Culture, hosted in Paris. Throughout the conference, he wore a mask to hide his identity, and presentations of his work were read by André Gide. Following the conference, Petersen was pursued by the Nazis, fleeing to Switzerland before emigrating to the United Kingdom.

=== Personal life ===
Petersen had a daughter named Bienchen Ohly.

== Work ==
Petersen's most well known work is the book Our Street, which was first published in English in 1938 by the Left Book Club. A later print on demand edition was republished by Faber & Faber in 2010. He also wrote scripts for the films Der Fall Dr. Wagner and The Call of the Sea.

== See also ==
- The Aesthetics of Resistance
