= Carola Braunbock =

East German actress

- Born: 9 January 1924; Všeruby, Czechoslovakia
- Died: 4 July 1978 (aged 54); East Berlin, East Germany
- Occupation: Actress
- Years active: 1951–1978 (film)

Carola Braunbock (1924–1978) was a Bohemian-born East German stage, television and film actress. She was born to an ethnically German family in the newly created Czechoslovakia.

== Selected filmography ==
- Man of Straw (1951)
- Goods for Catalonia (1959)
- Kein Ärger mit Cleopatra (1961)
- Follow Me, Scoundrels (1964)
- Bread and Roses (1967)
- Three Wishes for Cinderella (1973)

== Bibliography ==
- Eric Rentschler. German Film & Literature. Routledge, 2013.
