= Reserved for the Death =

1963 film

Reserviert für den Tod
- Directed by: Heinz Thiel
- Written by: Gerhard Bengsch
- Produced by: Erich Kühne
- Starring: Hans-Peter Minneti
- Cinematography: Horst E. Brandt
- Edited by: Anneliese Hinze-Sokolow
- Music by: Helmut Nier
- Production company: DEFA
- Distributed by: Progress Film
- Release date: 7 June 1963
- Running time: 85 minutes
- Country: East Germany
- Language: German

Reserved for the Death (German: Reserviert für den Tod) is an East German film. It was released in 1963.

== Plot ==
Former East German engineer Erich Becker had been lured to West Germany by promises of a high reward. Now residing in Stockholm, he is recalled to serve as a spy in the East. He is to convince Dr. Jadenburg to flee from the GDR with the help of his daughter Hanna, who works for the West. While travelling on the train with Hanna, he is told that he is also to kill another agent who has betrayed the West and now works for the Stasi. The traitor is revealed to be a former friend of Becker, Harry Korb. Becker cannot bring himself to kill Korb when they meet. Korb tells him that it was all a test to prove if he is reliable; since Becker failed, Korb murders him. Stasi agents capture Korb soon after.

== Cast ==
- Hans-Peter Minetti: Erich Becker
- Peter Herden: Harry Korb
- Irma Münch: Hanna Melvien
- Martin Flörchinger: Dr. Jadenburg
- Hannjo Hasse: Captain Donath
- Peter Sturm: conductor
- Heinz Hinze: Charles Renier
- Herbert Köfer: Cellist
- Hans Klering: blonde man
- Horst Schönemann: Stein
- Werner Lierck: young husband
- Gertrud Brendler: Mrs. Simmel
- Klaus Gendries: Border Police officer
- Harry Studt: Grott

== Production ==
Reserved for the Death was, according to author Sabine Hake, one of a "hyperbole of espionage thrillers" produced soon after the erection of the Berlin Wall.

Writer Gerhard Bensch told in an interview that the plot was based on "numerous authentic documents, files and details" gleaned by him from the intelligence services. After an evaluation board of DEFA viewed the unedited picture before its release, its members concluded that the producers managed to create a "good picture... Exposing the inhuman methods of the Imperialists... And allowing the audience to see the experiences of our society's heroes, engaged in brutal class struggle."

== Reception ==
The reviewer of the East German Berliner Zeitung called the film "a better-than-average criminal film, that will surely be well received by the public." On 5 July 1963, the film critic of the West German Rheinische Merkur wrote that the film was a "disturbing piece of nonsense... Communist picture of the lowest sort."

The German Film Lexicon described "Reserved for the Death" as "a lurid, watchable spy film."

Peter Ulrich Weiss added that it was a typical 'saboteur film', that presented a negative portrayal of West Germany.
