= Christine Laszar =

German actress (1931–2021)

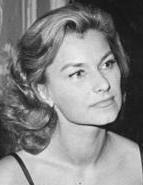
- Laszar in 1964
- Born: 19 December 1931; Ortelsburg, East Prussia, Prussia, Germany
- Died: 17 November 2021 (aged 89); Berlin, Germany
- Other names: Christel Lazarus; Christine Lesser
- Occupation: Actress
- Spouse(s): Rudolf Schündler (divorced); Karl-Eduard von Schnitzler (divorced)

Christine Laszar (19 December 1931 – 17 November 2021) was a German actress.

== Biography ==
Laszar was born Christine "Christel" Lazarus in Ortelsburg, East Prussia, Prussia, Germany (today Szczytno, Poland).

She was educated at the West Berlin Max Reinhardtstageschool and began her career at the Renaissance-Theater (Berlin), the "Die Stachelschweine" and the Munich "Schaubude". She also appeared at the Volksbühne Berlin (East Berlin).

In the 1950s, she married Rudolf Schündler (divorced). In 1958, she moved to East Germany and married Karl-Eduard von Schnitzler (the marriage was divorced shortly after). Laszar appeared in several movies of the DEFA.

In the early 1970s, she worked at the Deutscher Fernsehfunk and retired for health reasons in the 1980s.

Laszar died in Berlin on 17 November 2021, at the age of 89.

== Filmography ==
- 1954: Zwischenfall im Roxy
- 1958: Geschwader Fledermaus
- 1959: Die Premiere fällt aus
- 1959: Bevor der Blitz einschlägt
- 1959: Weißes Blut
- 1960: Hochmut kommt vor dem Knall
- 1960: Liebe auf den letzten Blick
- 1961: Der Fremde
- 1961: Der Arzt von Bothenow
- 1961: Der Traum des Hauptmann Loy
- 1961: Der Mann mit dem Objektiv
- 1962: Das Stacheltier: Der Fluch der bösen Tat
- 1962: Tempel des Satans
- 1962: Der Tod hat ein Gesicht
- 1963: For Eyes Only
- 1963: Carl von Ossietzky
- 1964: Schwarzer Samt
- 1964: Pension Boulanka
- 1965: Hamida
- 1965: Mörder auf Urlaub (Ubica na odsustvu)
- 1966: Schwarze Panther
- 1968: Tod im Preis inbegriffen
- 1969: Die Dame aus Genua
- 1969: Krupp und Krause (Serie)
- 1973: Privat nach Vereinbarung (Serie Eva und Adam)
