= The Call of the Sea (1951 film) =

1951 film

- Directed by: Eduard Kubat
- Written by: Jan Petersen; Otto Bernhard Wendler
- Starring: Hans Klering; Käte Alving; Evamaria Bath
- Cinematography: Emil Schünemann
- Edited by: Ruth Schreiber
- Music by: Horst Hans Sieber
- Production company: DEFA
- Distributed by: Progress Film
- Release date: 17 December 1951
- Running time: 86 minutes
- Country: East Germany
- Language: German

The Call of the Sea or The Oceans Are Calling (German: Die Meere rufen) is a 1951 East German drama film directed by Eduard Kubat and starring Hans Klering, Käte Alving and Evamaria Bath. A defector to West Germany returns to the East, having become disillusioned by capitalist society.

It was made by the state-owned DEFA studio. The film's production designer was Artur Günther.

== Cast ==
- Hans Klering as Ernst Reinhardt
- Käte Alving as Ida Reinhardt, dessen Frau
- Evamaria Bath as Gisela Reinhardt, beider Kind
- Helmut Ahner as Walter Reinhardt - beider Kind
- Herbert Richter as Franz Nölte
- Magdalene von Nußbaum as Emmi Nölte, seine Frau
- Viola Recklies as Inge Nölte, beider Kind
- Hans-Joachim Martens as Heinz Nölte, beider Kind
- Günther Ballier as Fischer Thomsen
- Fredy Barten as Erich Pascholle
- Albrecht Bethge as Auktionator
- Elfie Dugall as Trude
- Martin Flörchinger as Kurt Schöller
- Harry Gillmann
- Oskar Höcker as Fischmakler
- Kurt Jung-Alsen
- Herbert Kiper as Bürgermeister Gubitz
- Hans-Erich Korbschmitt
- Alfred Maack as Klüterbau
- Hans Maikowski as Hans Freese
- Willi Narloch as Richard Schweikert
- Wolfgang-Erich Parge as Karl Lamprecht
- Gustav Püttjer as Hein Bachmann
- Ursula Rank as Käte Flemming
- Johannes Schmidt as Heinrich Stüber
- Walter B. Schulz as Wilhelm Lehmann
- Friedrich Siemers as Dieter Specht
- Friedrich Teitge as Regierungsbeamter
- Christine von Trümbach
- Siegfried Weiß
- Teddy Wulff

== Bibliography ==
- Liehm, Mira; Liehm, Antonín J. (1980). The Most Important Art: Eastern European Film After 1945. University of California Press. p. 467. ISBN 978-0-520-04128-8.
