= Where Others Keep Silent =

1984 film

- Directed by: Ralf Kirsten
- Written by: Ralf Kirsten
- Starring: Gudrun Okras
- Cinematography: Günter Haubold
- Release date: 5 October 1984
- Running time: 106 minutes
- Country: East Germany
- Language: German

Where Others Keep Silent (German: Wo andere schweigen) is a 1984 East German drama film directed by Ralf Kirsten. It was entered into the 14th Moscow International Film Festival.

== Cast ==
- Gudrun Okras as Clara Zetkin
- Elke Reuter as Christa
- Rolf Ludwig as Gustav
- Klaus Manchen as John Schehr
- Klaus Piontek as Maxim
- Günter Junghans as Jürgen
- Dieter Bellmann as Erich
- Hans-Uwe Bauer as Fritz
- Bernd-Uwe Reppenhagen as Klaus
- Manfred Zetzsche as Nazi-Führer
