= Horst Kube =

German actor

Horst Kube (1920–1976) was a German actor.

== Selected filmography ==
- Ernst Thälmann - Führer seiner Klasse (1955)
- A Berlin Romance (1956)
- Der Fackelträger (1957)
- Schlösser und Katen (1957)
- Don't Forget My Little Traudel (1957)
- Zwei Mütter (1957)
- The Sailor's Song (1958)
- Sun Seekers (1958/1972)
- The Punch Bowl (1959)
- Special Mission (1959)
- Always on Duty (1960)
- No Trouble with Cleopatra (1960)
- The Sons of Great Bear (1966)
- Schwarze Panther (1966)
- The Banner of Krivoy Rog (1967)
- The Heathens of Kummerow (1967)
- Bread and Roses (1967)
- Spur des Falken (1968)
- Husaren in Berlin (1971)
