= The Dress (1961 film) =

1961 film

- Directed by: Konrad Petzold; Egon Günther
- Written by: Egon Günther
- Based on: "The Emperor's New Clothes" by Hans Christian Andersen
- Starring: Wolf Kaiser
- Cinematography: Hans Hauptmann
- Release date: 1991
- Running time: 88 minutes
- Country: East Germany
- Language: German

The Dress (German: Das Kleid) is an East German comedy film directed by Konrad Petzold and Egon Günther. It was produced in 1961 and released in 1991.

== Cast ==
- Wolf Kaiser as Kaiser Max
- Horst Drinda as Hans - Tuchwebergeselle
- Werner Lierck as Kumpan - Tuchwebergeselle
- Lore Frisch as Bekleidungsminister
- Gerd E. Schäfer as Außenminister
- Kurt Rackelmann as Innenminister
- Erik S. Klein as Küchenminister
- Eva-Maria Hagen as Katrin
- Günther Simon as Fleischer
- Hans Klering as Holzauge
- Harry Gillmann as Schnapsnase
- Gerhard Rachold as Latte
- Harry Riebauer as Der Tünne
