= Bread and Roses (1967 film) =

1967 film

- Directed by: Heinz Thiel; Horst E. Brandt
- Written by: Gerhard Bengsch
- Produced by: Robert Kreis
- Starring: Günther Simon
- Cinematography: Horst E. Brandt
- Release date: 28 August 1967
- Running time: 103 minutes
- Country: East Germany
- Language: German

Bread and Roses (German: Brot und Rosen) is a 1967 East German drama film directed by Heinz Thiel and Horst E. Brandt. It was entered into the 5th Moscow International Film Festival.

== Cast ==
- Günther Simon as Georg Landau
- Harry Hindemith as Paul Kallam
- Eva-Maria Hagen as Jutta Lendau geb. Krell
- Carola Braunbock as Emmi Krell
- Helga Göring as Dr. Helene Seydlitz
- Johanna Clas as Eleanore Mergenthin
- Fred Delmare as Kurt Kalweit
- Jürgen Frohriep as Siegfried Schlentz
- Helmut Schreiber as Emil
- Horst Kube as Börner
- Günther Polensen as Erich
- Willi Schrade as Willi
