= Evamaria Bath =

German actress (1929–2023)

- Born: 12 April 1929; Berlin, Weimar Republic
- Died: 18 June 2023 (aged 94)
- Occupation: Actress
- Years active: 1951–1994 (film and television)

Evamaria Bath (12 April 1929 – 18 June 2023) was a German stage, film and television actress.

Bath died on 18 June 2023, at the age of 94.

== Selected filmography ==
- The Call of the Sea (1951)
- Natürlich die Nelli (1959)
- The Red Snowball Tree (1974, East German dub)

== Bibliography ==
- Peter Cowie & Derek Elley. World Filmography: 1967. Fairleigh Dickinson University Press, 1977.
