= Follow Me, Scoundrels =

- Directed by: Ralf Kirsten
- Written by: Joachim Kupsch (novel); Manfred Krug; Ulrich Plenzdorf; Ralf Kirsten
- Starring: Manfred Krug; Monika Woytowicz; Fred Düren
- Cinematography: Hans Heinrich
- Edited by: Christel Röhl
- Music by: Andre Asriel
- Production company: DEFA
- Distributed by: VEB Progress Film
- Release date: 31 July 1964
- Running time: 103 minutes
- Country: East Germany
- Language: German

Follow Me, Scoundrels (German: Mir nach, Canaillen!) is a 1964 East German historical adventure film directed by Ralf Kirsten and starring Manfred Krug, Monika Woytowicz, and Fred Düren.

The film's sets were designed by the art directors Jochen Keller and Hans Poppe.

== Cast ==
- Manfred Krug as Alexander
- Monika Woytowicz as Ulrike
- Fred Düren as Leutnant Lübbenau
- Carola Braunbock as Baronin Lübbenau
- Norbert Christian as Gerichtsherr
- Marion Van de Kamp as Denhoff
- Harald Halgardt as Kronenberg
- Helga Göring as Freiin von Lübbenau
- Marianne Wünscher as Wäscherin
- Helmut Schreiber as Finanzminister
- Walter Lendrich as Sekretarius
- Helmut Bruchhausen as Pape
- Heinz Scholz as Notarius
- Horst Papke as Korporal
- Jutta Wachowiak as Mätresse
- Fritz Links as Fischer
- Hans Hardt-Hardtloff as Soldat in Pulverkammer
- Otto Erich Edenharter as Bauer
- Gerhard Vogt as Bauer
- Axel Triebel as Kutscher
- Willi Neuenhahn as Überlandkutscher
- Joachim Bober as Überlandkutscher
- Peter Dommisch as Gerichtsbüttel
- Edwin Marian as Page
- Friedrich Teitge as Diener
- Lilo Grahn as Bauernmädchen
- Herwart Grosse as Onkel

== Bibliography ==
- Feinstein, Joshua (2002). The Triumph of the Ordinary: Depictions of Daily Life in the East German Cinema, 1949–1989. Chapel Hill: University of North Carolina Press. ISBN 978-0-8078-5385-6.
