= Bärenburger Schnurre =

1957 film

- Directed by: Ralf Kirsten
- Written by: Ralf Kirsten; Hermann Werner Kubsch
- Starring: Paul Heidemann
- Release date: 10 February 1957
- Running time: 75 minutes
- Country: East Germany
- Language: German

Bärenburger Schnurre is an East German family film directed by Ralf Kirsten. It was released in 1957.

== Cast ==
- Paul Heidemann as Bürgermeister
- Axel Dietrich as Hansel
- Erika Dunkelmann as Hansels Mutter
- Harry Hindemith as Hansels Vater
- Doris Abeßer as Hansels Schwester
- Kurt Ulrich as Lehrer Möbius
- Christoph Picha as Peter
- Gerry Wolff as Stadtrat Müller
- Helga Göring as Karins Mutter
- Eberhard Kratz as Pförtner Bräsicke
- Herbert Lange as 1. Volkspolizist
- Fritz Stoewer as 2. Volkspolizist
- Ellen Plessow as Pförtnerin
- Walter E. Fuß as Fahrer des Bürgermeisters
- Carl Hamann as Nachtpförtner
