= Somewhere in Berlin =

1946 film

- Film poster
- Directed by: Gerhard Lamprecht
- Written by: Gerhard Lamprecht
- Starring: Charles Brauer, Hans Trinkaus, Siegfried Utecht, Harry Hindemith, Hedda Sarnow
- Cinematography: Werner Krien
- Music by: Erich Einegg
- Release date: 1946
- Running time: 85 minutes
- Country: Germany
- Language: German

Somewhere in Berlin (German: Irgendwo in Berlin) is a film produced in the Soviet occupation zone of Allied-occupied Germany, the area that later became East Germany. It was released in 1946, and was the third DEFA film. It sold 4,179,651 tickets. It was part of the group of rubble films made in the aftermath of the Second World War.

== Cast ==
- Harry Hindemith – Iller
- Hedda Sarnow – Frau Iller
- Charles Brauer – Gustav Iller
- Hans Trinkhaus – Willi, sein Freund
- Siegfried Utecht – „Kapitän“
- Hans Leibelt – Eckmann
- Paul Bildt – Birke
- Fritz Rasp – Waldemar
- Walter Bluhm – Onkel Kale
- Lotte Loebinger – Frau Steidel

== Plot ==
A group of children play in the ruins of Berlin after World War II. One boy's father comes home from a POW camp. The boy is saddened to see his father as a hopeless, powerless man, but the children eventually give the father fresh hope by persuading him to clean up his badly bomb-damaged garage business.

== Bibliography ==
- Shandley, Robert. Rubble Films: German Cinema in the Shadow of the Third Reich. Temple University Press, 2010.
