= Geschwader Fledermaus =

1958 film

- Directed by: Erich Engel
- Written by: Hans Székely
- Release date: 1958
- Country: East Germany
- Language: German

Geschwader Fledermaus (Bat squadron) is an East German film. It was released in 1958.

== Cast ==
- Wolfgang Heinz – General Lee
- Christine Laszar – Flessy
- Günther Simon – Tex Stankowsky
- Kurd Pieritz – Mitch Bryk
- Norbert Christian – Terry Varney
- Hans-Walter Clasen – Andy West
- Werner Lierck – Sam Kirby
- Otto Stark – Leo Cayman
- Gerhard Frei – Percy Brown
- Horst Schön – Smart Lewis
- Dom de Beern – John Cainfield
- Wolf Martini – Colonel D'Allard
- Thi Hoa Nguyen – Thao
- Benno Bentzin – Lieutenant Matthieu
- Johannes Knittel – Lieutenant Lambert
