= Snow White (1961 film) =

1961 film

Schneewittchen
- DVD cover
- Directed by: Gottfried Kolditz
- Written by: Günter Kaltofen
- Based on: Snow White by the Brothers Grimm
- Starring: Doris Weikow; Marianne Christina Schilling; Wolf-Dieter Panse; Harry Hindemith; Steffie Spira; Arthur Reppert; Jochen Köppel; Georg Irmer; Fred Delmare; Heinz Scholz; Willi Scholz
- Cinematography: Erwin Anders
- Edited by: Ursula Zweig
- Music by: Siegfried Tiefensee
- Production company: DEFA
- Distributed by: VEB Progress Film-Vertrieb
- Release date: October 6, 1961
- Running time: 63 min.
- Country: East Germany
- Language: German

Schneewittchen is a 1961 East German film, directed by Gottfried Kolditz and based on the fairy tale Snow White by the Brothers Grimm.

The film's plot is quite faithful to the Grimm's version, and the changes made to the film can be compared to the Walt Disney film from 1937.

== Plot ==
Jealous of her beautiful stepdaughter Snow White, an evil queen asks a hunter to kill the young princess, but the man lets the girl escape into the woods, where she finds refuge with the seven dwarfs. Having learned of the hunter's deception from her magic mirror, the queen decides to kill the girl with her own hands, disguised as an old lady. After two failed attempts, the queen succeeds to kill her with a poisoned apple. But a prince's love brings the girl back to life after one of the dwarves knocked over the coffin, causing an apple slice to emerge from her throat. Invited to their wedding and humiliated, the evil stepmother flees.

== Cast ==
- Doris Weikow – Snow White
- Marianne Christina Schilling – Evil Queen
- Wolf-Dieter Panse – Prince
- Harry Hindemith – Royal Huntsman
- Steffie Spira – Old Crone
- Arthur Reppert – Rumpelbold
- Jochen Köppel – Purzelbaum
- Georg Irmer – Packe
- Fred Delmare – Naseweis
- Heinz Scholz – Puck
- Willi Scholz – Huckepack
- Horst Jonischkan – Pick
- Fritz Schlegel – Cook
- Gerry Wolff – Narrator

== Production ==
The film was shot in the DEFA studios in Babelsberg. Doris Weikow, the actress playing Snow White, was a presenter and announcer for Deutscher Fernsehfunk from 1965.

== Reception ==
The picture sold 7,597,495 tickets and it was seen by around 4.5 million spectators, making it one of the 20 most successful fairy-tale and children's films in East Germany.

== Home media ==
The film was released on DVD by Icestorm Entertainment on March 21, 2001 and on September 13, 2010 in a digitally restored version. It was released for the first time on Blu-ray by Fernsehenjuwelen GmbH on November 2, 2023.
