= Natürlich die Nelli =

1959 film

- Directed by: Konrad Petzold
- Release date: 1959
- Country: East Germany
- Language: German

Natürlich die Nelli is an East German film directed by Konrad Petzold. It was released in 1959.

== Cast ==
- Evamaria Bath as Mutter Frenz
- Wolfgang Lippert as Vater Frenz
- Senta Bonacker as Oma Trabekow
- Ilse Bastubbe as Frau Steinfuß - Hortnerin
- Dieter Perlwitz as Pionierleiter
- Ada Mahr as Frau Haller
- Karl-Heinz Weiss as Wachtmann (as Karl-Heinz Weiß)
- Barbara Mehlan as Fräulein Reiche
- Birgit Neubert as Nelli
- Marion Weitlich as Ingelore
- Ursula Schulze as Hilde
- Joachim Pape as Kulli
- Joachim Gaier as Volker
- Klaus-Dieter Klebsch as Uwe
- Bernd Hinze as Häuschen
- Gerd Zewner as Lutz
- Reinhold Wieseke as Franz
- André Adolf as Hermann
