= Between Day and Night =

1975 film

- Directed by: Horst E. Brandt
- Written by: Erich Weinert
- Starring: Hermann Beyer
- Cinematography: Günter Haubold
- Release date: July 1975
- Running time: 90 minutes
- Country: East Germany
- Language: German

Between Day and Night (German: Zwischen Nacht und Tag) is a 1975 East German drama film directed by Horst E. Brandt. It was entered into the 9th Moscow International Film Festival.

== Plot ==
Episodes from the life of the German poet and communist Erich Weinert (1890–1953): Life in Paris, participated in the war in Spain, the years of exile in Russia.

== Cast ==
(In alphabetical order)

- Hermann Beyer as Carl
- Kurt Böwe as Erich Weinert
- Michael Christian as Fred
- Yelena Drapeko
- Wolfgang Greese as Wilhelm
- Gert Gütschow as R.
- Rolf Hoppe
- Stefan Lisewski as Hans K.
- Katja Paryla as Li Weinert
- Leonid Reutov as Wolodja
- Dietmar Richter-Reinick as Kumpel
- Gudrun Ritter as Carl's Wife
- Gisela Stoll as Elsa
- Olga Strub as Marianne
- Rudolf Ulrich as Peter
- Manfred Zetzsche as Ernst
