= Eduard Kubat =

German director, production manager and producer

- Born: 30 November 1891; Essen, German Empire
- Died: 2 February 1976 (aged 84); Potsdam, East Germany
- Occupations: Producer, Director, Production Manager
- Years active: 1923-1957 (film)

Eduard Kubat (1891–1976) was a German film producer, who also directed two films. During the Nazi era he was employed by Terra Film, but following the Second World War he went to work for DEFA, the state-controlled company of East Germany.

== Selected filmography ==
=== Production manager ===
- The Lost Shoe (1923)
- The Other Woman (1924)
- The False Step (1939)
- Allez Hopp (1946)
- Bürgermeister Anna (1950)

=== Producer ===
- Victor and Victoria (1933)
- What Men Know (1933)
- Winter Night's Dream (1935)
- Alarm in Peking (1937)
- Two Worlds (1940)
- Doctor Crippen (1942)
- Sky Hounds (1942)
- The Golden Spider (1943)
- When the Young Wine Blossoms (1943)
- 1-2-3 Corona (1948)
- Friday the Thirteenth (1949)

=== Director ===
- The Call of the Sea (1951)
- Swings or Roundabouts (1953)

== Bibliography ==
- Richards, Jeffrey. Visions of Yesterday. Routledge & Kegan Paul, 1973.
