= Adrian Piotrovsky =

Russian Soviet dramaturge

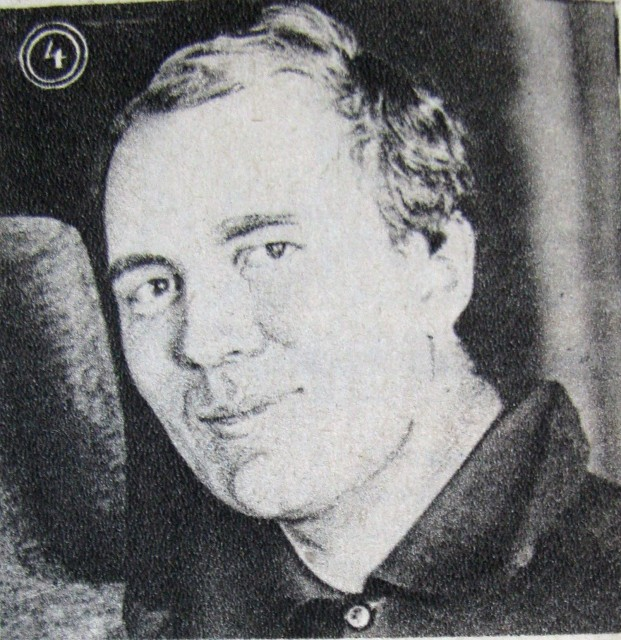
Piotrovsky in 1926

Adrian Ivanovich Piotrovsky (Russian: Адриа́н Ива́нович Пиотро́вский) (20 November [O.S. 8 November] 1898 – 21 November 1937) was a Russian Soviet dramaturge, responsible for creating the synopsis for Sergei Prokofiev's ballet Romeo and Juliet. He was the "acknowledged godfather" of the Workers' Youth Theatre (Teatr Rabochey Molodyozhi: TRAM).

== Life and career ==
The illegitimate son of the prominent Polish classicist Tadeusz Stefan Zieliński, Piotrovsky became Zielinski's pupil and made scholarly translations of classical Greek plays. He was strongly influenced by Zielinski's campaign to revive open-air Greek theatre, which would directly inspire Piotrovsky's involvement in street theatre in the years following the October Revolution.

Piotrovsky also became a pupil and disciple of the theatre director Vsevolod Meyerhold, and for a while worked with Meyerhold in the Theatrical department of Narkompros (the Commissariat of Enlightenment under the leadership of Anatoly Lunacharsky), teaching classes in Meyerhold's "Courses in the Mastery of Staging"; but by the 1920s he had distanced himself from Meyerhold's theatre. By this time he had become a close friend and colleague of the theatre director Sergei Radlov (who was also a disciple of Zielinski's), and in 1919 their first collaborative project, The Battle of Salamis (a play intended for schoolchildren), was staged under Radlov's direction.

By 1919 Piotrovsky was a member of the Petrograd formalist group OPOJAZ, and he wrote and directed plays at the People's Comedy Theatre (Teatr Narodnoy Komedii). In spite of his interest in popular and street theatre, he also displayed certain elitist tendencies, arguing in an article entitled "Dictatorship", published in October 1920, that state control of the arts was necessary, since otherwise the arts would become prey to both the "petty shopkeeper" and the "man on the street".

He taught in the Division for the History and Theory of the Theatre (founded in 1920) at the State Institute for the History of the Arts (GIII). He was closely associated with TRAM, acting as its principle ideologue. By 1930 the theatre was under attack, accused of "formalism" by its critics from among journalists and rival proletarian organizations. In May 1931 Piotrovsky's play Rule, Britannia was staged with music by Dmitri Shostakovich.

Piotrovsky became artistic director of the Leningrad Film Studio. In 1934 he met Prokofiev, and suggested to him the subject of Romeo and Juliet for a ballet. After Prokofiev had drafted an original treatment of the story, it was further worked upon by Piotrovsky and Sergei Radlov.

On 6 February 1936 Piotrovsky was attacked in a Pravda editorial, "Balletic Falsehood", for his libretto, written in collaboration with Fyodor Lopukhov, of the ballet The Limpid Stream (with music by Shostakovich). He was arrested by the NKVD in July 1937, sentenced to death and shot on 21 November.

Adrian Piotrovsky was rehabilitated in July 1957.

== Sources ==
- Clark, Katerina Petersburg: Crucible of Cultural Revolution (Cambridge, Massachusetts: Harvard University Press, 1995)
- McBurney, Gerard "Shostakovich and the theatre": from The Cambridge Companion to Shostakovich ed. Pauline Fairclough and David Fanning. (Cambridge: Cambridge University Press, 2008)
- Morrison, Simon The People's Artist: Prokofiev's Soviet Years (Oxford: Oxford University Press, 2008)
