= Konrad Petzold =

- Born: April 26, 1930; Radebeul, Saxony, Germany
- Died: November 12, 1999 (aged 69); Kleinmachnow
- Occupation: Film Director

Konrad Petzold (26 April 1930, Radebeul - 12 November 1999, Kleinmachnow) was a German film director, writer, and actor.

== Biography ==
Born the youngest of six children in a poor family, he was the son of a worker and a housewife. After an internship at the Film and TV School of the Academy of Performing Arts in Prague (FAMU), he shot his first feature film in Czechoslovakia in 1955, a comedy called The Fools Among Us. His next film was an adventure film, A Dog in the Marsh, which brought him national recognition, especially among young people. However his next movie The Dress (1961), based on "The Emperor's New Clothes", was accused of hidden political satire, and he was temporarily dismissed from the profession.

Petzold, along with other directors such as Konrad Wolf, Heiner Carow, and Egon Günther, were part of the so-called "second DEFA generation" born in East Germany between 1920 and 1930.

In 1969, Petzold shot the first of five "american-indian films" (. After Gottfried Kolditz died suddenly on an aneurysm on 15 June 1982, Petzold directed his film Der Scout (The Scout), released 1983.

== Selected filmography ==
- Die Fahrt nach Bamsdorf (1956)
- Abenteuer in Bamsdorf (1958)
- Natürlich die Nelli (1959)
- Der Moorhund (1960)
- The Dress (co-director: Egon Günther, 1961)
- Die Jagd nach dem Stiefel (1962)
- Das Lied vom Trompeter (1964)
- Alfons Zitterbacke (1966)
- Weiße Wölfe (1969)
