= Monika Woytowicz =

German stage, film and television actress

- Born: 23 June 1944 (age 81); Barth, Germany
- Occupation: Actress
- Years active: 1964-

Monika Woytowicz (born 1944) is a German stage, film and television actress. She studied at the Theaterhochschule Leipzig.

== Selected filmography ==
- Follow Me, Scoundrels (1964)
- The Adventures of Werner Holt (1965)
- Die schwarze Mühle (1975)
- Zerbrochene Brücken (1986, TV film)
- A Touch of Danger (1988, TV film)

== Bibliography ==
- Shen, Qinna. The Politics of Magic: DEFA Fairy-Tale Films. Wayne State University Press, 2015.
