= Special Mission (1959 film) =

1959 film

Im Sonderauftrag
- Directed by: Heinz Thiel
- Written by: Hans Oliva
- Produced by: Hans Mahlich
- Starring: Hans-Peter Minetti
- Cinematography: Horst E. Brandt
- Edited by: Wally Gurschke
- Music by: Helmut Nier
- Production company: DEFA
- Distributed by: Progress Film
- Release dates: January 3, 1959 (premiere); January 9, 1959 (commercial release)
- Running time: 78 minutes
- Country: East Germany
- Language: German

Im Sonderauftrag (English-language title: Special Mission) is an East German black-and-white film directed by Heinz Thiel. It was released in 1959.

== Plot ==
In 1958, somewhere in the Baltic Sea, a People's Navy minesweeper commanded by Captain Fischer encounters a foreign boat. Its skipper is a man named Arendt, who served with Fischer in the Kriegsmarine during the Second World War. Fischer recalls how, in 1943, his superior Captain Lieutenant Wegner planned to defect to the Danish resistance and join the communists, but was arrested and sentenced to death. Fischer realizes that Arendt, one of the few who knew of Wegner's plans, was actually a Gestapo agent and betrayed him. Now, he understands that Arendt works for West Germany and intends to gather intelligence in the German Democratic Republic. Fischer foils his plans and the minesweeper returns to its mission.

== Cast ==
- Hans-Peter Minetti as Captain Lieutenant Fischer
- Rolf Ludwig as Arendt
- Fritz Diez as Captain Lieutenant Wegner
- Gerd Michael Henneberg as harbor commandant
- Günther Grabbert as Lieutenant Hermann
- Wolfgang Hübner as Lieutenant Berger
- Wilhelm Koch-Hooge as Petersen
- Herbert Körbs, as military judge
- Horst Kube as corporal Lutz
- Werner Lierck as Sergeant Kohl
- Katharina Matz as Ike
- Dieter Perlwitz as Jens Dahl
- Gustav Püttjer as Ole
- Albert Zahn as Thielicke
- Manfred Borges as Staff Sergeant Schneider

== Production ==
Of the 500 feature films created by DEFA from 1956, the year in which the National People's Army was founded, until its dismantlement during 1990, only five had their plot dealing explicitly with the East German armed forces - although many pictures were set in historical military formations, like the Wehrmacht, and DEFA produced many documentaries and news bulletins about the NVA. Of the five films, the first to be made was Im Sonderauftrag. It was also the only one among them to portray the People's Navy.

== Reception ==
The East German Cinema and Television Review defined Im Sonderauftrag as a "weak, fable-based" film that "used the anti-fascist theme in a schematic manner." The film was received well in the Soviet Union, and gained "considerable success" there. The German Film Lexicon cited Im Sonderauftrag as "thrilling and with good acting, although highly simplistic and committed to the political narrative of the Cold War."
