= Käte Alving =

German actress

- Born: 26 November 1896; Hamburg, German Empire
- Died: 8 December 1974 (aged 78); West Berlin, West Germany
- Occupation: Actress
- Years active: 1942–1961 (film)

Käte Alving (1896–1974) was a German stage and film actress.

== Selected filmography ==
- The Call of the Sea (1951)
- The Sonnenbrucks (1951)
- Consul Strotthoff (1954)
- Freddy, the Guitar and the Sea (1959)
- The Ambassador (1960)
- The True Jacob (1960)

== Bibliography ==
- Gerd Heinrichs. Schauspieler und Krebs: sind Schauspieler Krebspatienten oder Krebspatienten Schauspieler?. Wagner Verlag sucht Autoren, 2009.
