= Erich Gerberding =

German actor

Erich Gerberding was a German actor.

== Filmography ==
Year	Title	Role	Notes
1960	Die Flucht aus der Hölle	Pierre Vaudrin	Episode: "Das Verbrechen von Tebessa"
1962	Tempel des Satans	John Hammerlund	3 episodes
1962	Wenn Du zu mir hältst	Chefartz	
1962	Freispruch mangels Beweises	Dr. Alexander Steinhorst	
1963	Sonntagsfahrer	Teichert	
1964	Schwarzer Samt	Hauptmann Jensen	
1965-1966	Dr. Schlüter	Prof. Weimann	2 episodes
1966	Reise ins Ehebett	Polizeichef	
1968	Die Toten bleiben jung	Castricius	
1968	12 Uhr mittags kommt der Boß	Goldkunde	
1969	Projekt Aqua	Oberbauleiter Hansen	TV movie
1969	Hans Beimler, Kamerad	Wieslochbauer	3 episodes
1970	Sudba rezidenta	Makkloy	
1971	Liberation III: Direction of the Main Blow	Generalfeldmarschall Ernst Busch	
1971	Karriere		
1972	Der Staatsanwalt hat das Wort: Alleingang	Werner Hartinger	Episode: "Alleingang"
1974	Wolz – Leben und Verklärung eines deutschen Anarchisten	Fabrikant Rohne	
1975	Take Aim	Leslie Groves	
1978	Scharnhorst	Hans David von York	TV Mini-Series
1980	Clausewitz – Lebensbild eines preußischen Generals	Yorck	TV movie
1981	Peters Jugend		
1986	Polizeiruf 110	Marcanti	Episode: "Mit List und Tücke", (final appearance)
