= Left Column (theater troupe) =

The Left Column (German: Kolonne Links) was an agitprop theater troupe during the 1920s and 1930s. The troupe worked in support of the Workers International Relief (WIR). During the Nazi era, some of the group went into exile in the Soviet Union, where some of the members were arrested by the Soviet secret police in the Great Purge and in connection with the Hitler Youth Conspiracy.

== History ==
In its early years, the group consisted of nine people, none of whom had any theatrical training, a pianist and a driver. The Berlin troupe was one of the most highly praised agitprop troupes in Germany, despite its lack of training.

Hans Hauska joined the troupe in late summer 1930.

In 1931, the Left Column were rewarded with a tour in the Soviet Union for five weeks for having gained 16,000 new members for the WIR. On their return, they discovered that several of their performances in Germany were cancelled because a March 28, 1931 decree from the Reichspräsident to combat violence led to a local prohibition against agitprop theater assemblies. Six members then left Germany, embarking on a 4-month trip by boat and train across Siberia back to Moscow. In 1933, under Gustav von Wangenheim's leadership, they established the German Left Column Theater with members of "Troupe 31", another agitprop theater group.

In 1935, troupe members Helmut Damerius and Bruno Schmidtsdorf, were in Wangenheim's 1935 anti-Nazi film, Kämpfer. Schmidtsdorf played the lead role, Fritz Lemke, and Hauska wrote the music.

Beginning in 1935, the NKVD began arresting members of the troupe in the Great Purge. All those arrested were members who had arrived in Moscow after 1932. Arrested members included Hans Hauska on November 20, 1937. On February 5, 1938, Kurt Ahrendt, Karl Oefelein and Schmidtsdorf were arrested, charged with starting a branch of the Hitler Youth, and were executed three weeks later. On March 17, 1938, Helmut Damerius, once a leader of the troupe, was arrested and sent to a gulag in Siberia. His sentence ended in 1946, after which he was exiled to Kazakhstan and forced to remain another eight years. Hauska, after four years in custody, and sentenced in a Nazi court on August 18, 1939 to one and a half years at hard labor in a Zuchthaus, was returned to the Nazis on December 5, 1940 under the Molotov–Ribbentrop Pact. Other arrested members were Hans Klering; Max Mielke, who arrived in Moscow in 1932, was arrested in 1938 and never heard from again; Albert Wolff; and Max (Samuel) Katzenellenbogen, a former member of the troupe in Berlin, who fled to Moscow after having been arrested by the Gestapo. He was arrested by the NKVD in 1937 and never heard from again.

Damerius survived his imprisonment, as did Klering, who returned to Germany in 1946 and became a co-founder of DEFA. Damerius was unable to leave the Soviet Union until 1956.

== Notable members ==
- Helmut Damerius
- Hans Hauska
- Hans Klering
- Gustav von Wangenheim

== See also ==
- Blue Blouse
