= Blue Blouse =

Avant-garde propagandist theatre

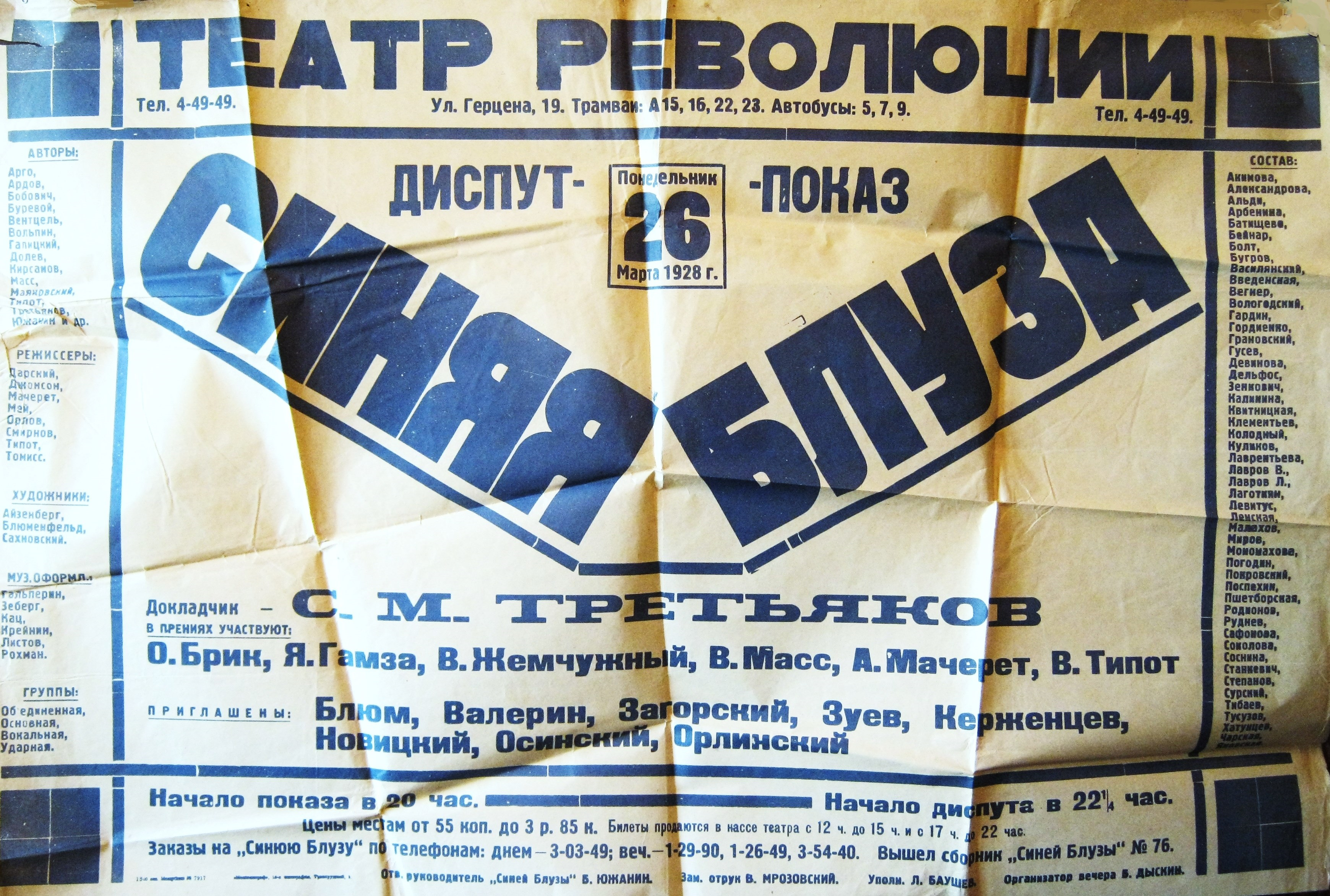
Poster for a 1926 Blue Blouse production

The Blue Blouse (Russian: Синяя блуза, romanized: Sinyaya Bluza) was an influential agitprop theatre collective in the early Soviet Union. Boris Yuzhanin created the first Blue Blouse troupe under the auspices of the Moscow Institute of Journalism in 1923. Their example encouraged similar workers' theatre companies across the country and worldwide; by 1927 there were more than 5,000 Blue Blouse troupes in the Soviet Union with more than 100,000 members. In the autumn of that year, the original troupe began a tour in Erwin Piscator's theatre in Berlin that provoked a rapid growth of agitprop troupes across Weimar Germany.

The blue workers' uniforms, in which the actors performed, gave the troupe its name, under which they also published a magazine, which contained scripts and detailed descriptions of staging, costumes, and the troupe's other theatrical techniques, along with news reports and current affairs. Its variety style made many demands on its performers, requiring "a young deft man trained in physical culture, trained in the striking word, in the cheerful, bold and hard-hitting song and couplet, in the contemporary rhythm of the grotesque and simplistic," its magazine explained.

The rehearsal process was extremely rigorous, requiring actors to stay physically and mentally alert through a strict exercise program and by keeping up with the political topics of the day. The year 1927 marked the end of the Blue Blouse organisation, when it was forced to merge with the more orthodox Workers' Youth Theatre (TRAM).

== Characteristics of performances ==
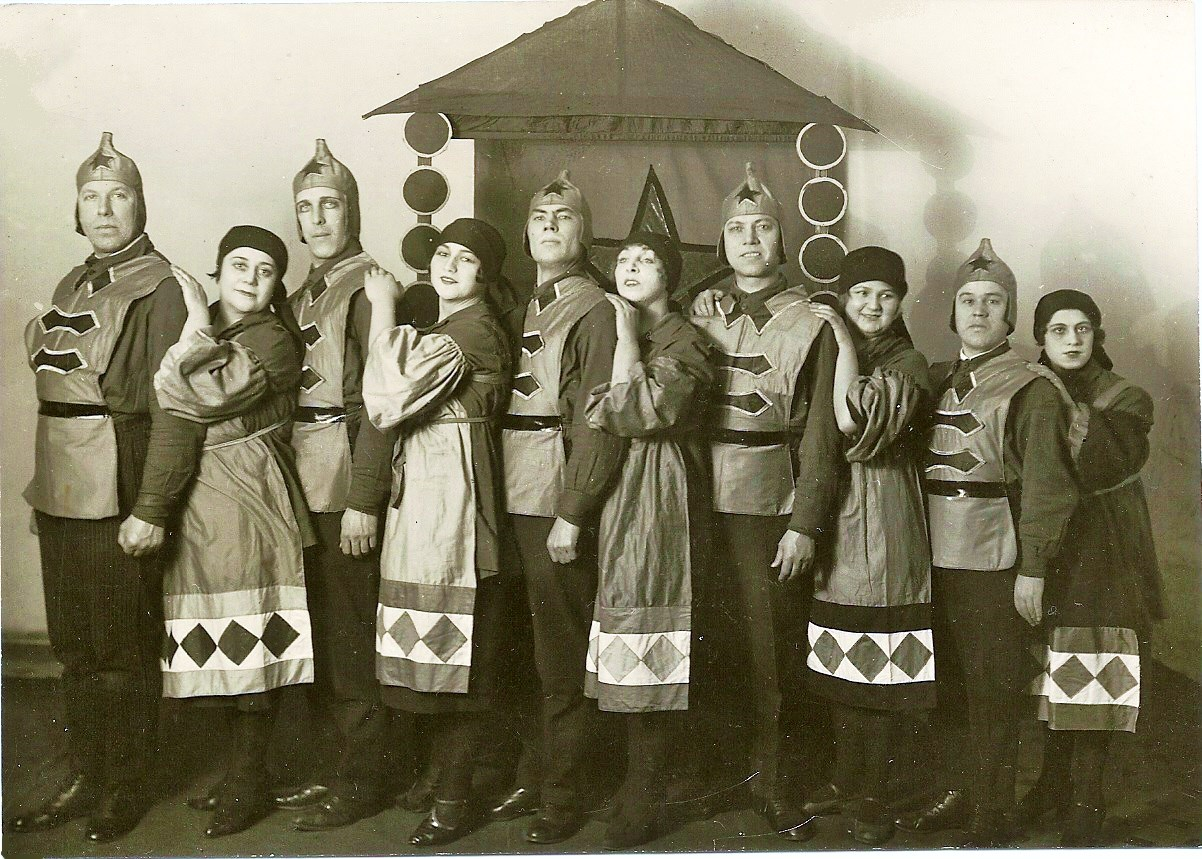
Blue Blouse troupe, 1928

Blue Blouse theatre combined many stylistic elements and art forms and imbued them with socio-political meaning with the intent of reaching the Soviet people. In the early years of the Soviet Union, multiple small form amateur theatre groups arose. Blue Blouse became one of the most popular because of its dynamic performances that were able to use entertainment and comedy to connect with the people on a personal level about daily life and news. Each performance, though enjoyable, had a political message, which expressed the opinions of the Soviet regime to the common people, targeting the working class.

Blue Blouse theatre had specific requirements when it came to basic features of performance, such as outfits, props, and setting. They even published a manifesto with details on the specific characteristics of what to wear, how to act, and what music to use. The most basic component of their outfit, and where they got their name, was the blue workers shirt as well as black trousers or a skirt. The actors used workers garments to help connect to the populace. Other clothing also made it easy to switch characters. The clothing was often embellished with props to distinguish the role of the performer, a capitalist often being defined by a top hat or a bureaucrat by a red pencil. The only time the actors did not wear workers clothing was during acrobatic or gymnastic performances. The performances were meant to be practical and accessible as well as enjoyable.

The performances took place in clubs, cafeterias, factory floors, and outside. Tables and stools were sometimes used as props if they served a purpose but were otherwise thought to "slow down the tempo of movement and obstruct access to the stage." The Blue Blouse collective wrote a document where they state that they "are against bright beauty and realistic sets and decoration." Blue Blouse was very particular about all aspects of performance having a specific purpose to convey a specific message.

Blue Blouse theatre incorporated a myriad of different artistic mediums of performance as well as talents such as dancing and singing to create dynamic performances with identifiable acts. Blue Blouse continued with the tradition of living newspaper, which involved presenting the important news stories of the day to the people. This originally stemmed from high illiteracy rates, so somebody would read the newspaper out loud. This practice evolved to the paper being acted out with visual assistance, providing an effective way to get news across and speak to the workers. Blue Blouse used the living newspaper technique through "satirical songs, lively posters, dances, and pantomime."

The performances were made to be interesting for the audience and used a variety of techniques. One technique was dramatic form, which included monologue, dialogue, and singing. Other forms were those derived from dance and gymnastics, such as acrobatics. Blue Blouse made use of posters, as well as musical numbers, and even some film. There was an incredible amount of variety. Due to all the different techniques used the actors needed to be versatile and have the ability to sing, be athletic, and "transform," meaning to be able to easily adjust from act to act. Actors were also not supposed to show any emotion. The performance would begin with a parade of headliners and continue with 8-10 vignettes on topics ranging from international affairs to local ones. The performance would end with a parade as well as a recap of the performance, with special attention on the political message.

Though the performances were meant to be fun, they were also meant to help the Soviet regime. Blue Blouse drew on folk theatre as well as urban culture to help appeal to the populace. The people were familiar with folk theatre so aspects were intertwined with Blue Blouse, such as a "rupor" whose role was to present the scene and tie skits together. As urban culture grew it was also incorporated, Blue Blouse theatre trying to stay in touch with their audience. As for the actual dialogue of Blue Blouse performances, it was supposed to be taken from the Blue Blouse newspaper that was published and tied in with local themes, using materials from papers and magazines. Information was to be kept relevant to the lives of those watching the performances.

== Blue Blouse as political propaganda ==
The history behind Blue Blouse serves as an explanation for how the theatre group emerged as a means of political propaganda in the Soviet Union. Shortly after the beginning of the Soviet Union, the government put the New Economic Policy into action, which helped stabilize the country economically. Funds were still tight but the Soviet regime saw the benefit of beginning a cultural campaign to turn the populace to the communist way of life. Theatre revival had already begun after the revolution and so the Soviets wanted to use this as a means to reach the people, and one that proved to be effective. Blue Blouse in particular became very popular along with other small forms because of their lack of funds and resources and their intimacy with the audience. The Soviet regime saw that they could use theatre as a means of speaking to and manipulating the population.

Though Blue Blouse was very entertaining, it had political content and a specific agenda to get across. By the summer of 1924 all living newspapers gained backing as a "method of agitation and propaganda serving the political, productive, and domestic tasks of the proletariat." Those who were enemies of the Soviets were satirized, and those who were heroes were put on a pedestal. Blue Blouse was used to "impart lessons on how Soviet citizens should live, what books they should read, what their hygienic habits should be, and how they should relate to the Soviet regime." Whatever topics were relevant to the politics of the time were incorporated into Blue Blouse theatre.

Common characters that emerged in Blue Blouse for political commentary were capitalist, banker, premier, NEPman, Kulak, Menshevik, Social Revolutionary, General, Lady, Female Worker, Female Komsomol, Red Army Man, the Peasant, and the Worker. All of these characters were extremely pertinent at the time and carried strong political messages. In a time of industrialization the worker was a very relevant character and one that was targeted in the performances. The Russian Revolution had happened recently in 1917 and was still fresh in everyone’s minds. The NEP was currently underway as Blue Blouse prospered, making it a very pertinent topic, especially since it involved restricted capitalism and the revolution was against this. Blue Blouse frequently used these characters, and always to the advantage and opinions of the regime. Asides from characters, Blue Blouse included important political topics such as industrialization. There was one skit done called "Industrialization" which involved the actors wearing symbols which made clear they were supposed to be factories and other items relevant to industrialization. They ended by standing on each other’s backs to represent the finished system. It was very abstract and humorous yet imbued with meaning.

Blue Blouse was an important theatre movement and political tool in the Soviet Union. Critics of Blue Blouse thought it was theatre for the workers but not by the workers or wasn’t educational because it was so entertaining. Overall though, it was influential and received a positive response, becoming extremely popular, very fast, due to its relevancy and ability to be entertaining. Due to Blue Blouse serving as political propaganda for the Soviet Union, it serves as a way of looking at the Soviet agenda and influence through theatre. The Blue Blouse was like a live-action newspaper at a time with much illiteracy.

== See also ==
- Left Column theater troupe
