= Carl Alving =

American internist

Carl Alving is an American internist, currently at Walter Reed Army Institute of Research and an Elected Fellow of the American Association for the Advancement of Science.
