= Sein großer Sieg =

1952 film

- Directed by: Franz Barrenstein
- Release date: 1952
- Country: East Germany
- Language: German

Sein großer Sieg is an East German film. It was released in 1952.
