= Manfred Zetzsche =

German actor (1930–2023)

Manfred Zetzsche (10 February 1930 – 22 August 2023) was a German actor. He died on 22 August 2023, at the age of 93.

== Selected filmography ==
- Johannes Kepler (1974)
- Between Day and Night (1975)
- Where Others Keep Silent (1984)

== Bibliography ==
- Frank-Burkhard Habel and Volker Wachter: Das große Lexikon der DDR-Stars. Schwarzkopf & Schwarzkopf, Berlin 2002, ISBN 3-89602-391-8.
