= No Trouble with Cleopatra =

Kein Ärger mit Cleopatra
- Directed by: Helmut Schneider
- Written by: Manfred Petzold
- Produced by: Werner Dau
- Starring: Maly Delschaft
- Cinematography: Günter Eisinger, Hans Hauptmann
- Edited by: Friedel Welsandt
- Music by: Kurt Grottke
- Production company: DEFA
- Distributed by: Progress Film
- Release date: 8 December 1960
- Running time: 83 minutes
- Country: East Germany
- Language: German

Kein Ärger mit Cleopatra (English-language title: No Trouble with Cleopatra) is an East German comedy film, directed by Helmut Schneider. It was released in 1960.

== Plot ==
The farm of the Kahlow family is struck by disaster: although it mated with neighbor Grossig's white swine, their white sow delivered black piglets, a sinister omen. The old Grandmother Kahlow interprets this as a sign from heaven not to join the nearby Agricultural Cooperative, although her grandson Claus - who wants to marry Grossig's daughter, Irma - wishes them to do so. Grossig supports her, and declares the piglets to be "unchristian", although the village priest resents that. But then, Father Melcior is also afflicted by the phenomenon: his sow, Cleopatra, delivers black piglets. He decides that the Old Kahlow is correct, and plans to start his own, Christian Cooperative, "with white pigs only". The villagers are very much upset. Wild rumors, fanned by superstition, take hold among them. In the Cooperative, the young animal breeder Inge discovers that Lubanski, the pig herder, secretly trained his black hog Brutus to sneak through fences, so he could mate with the farmers' sows. Lubanski, who greatly enjoyed the pandemonium, agrees to reveal the truth to the farmers. They all agree to join the Collective.

== Cast ==
- Maly Delschaft as Grandmother Kahlow
- Peter Sturm as Mathias Kahlow
- Carola Braunbock Caroline Kahlow
- Günther Simon as Cooperative chief
- Angela Brunner as Inge Reinert
- Horst Kube as Jan Lubenski
- Dieter Perlwitz as Claus Kahlow
- Gerd Ehlers as Gottlieb Grossig
- Peter Dommisch as Peter Jaschke
- Agnes Kraus as Amanda Bolte
- Heinz Scholz as Lucas Melcior
- Monika Lennartz as Irma Grossig

== Production ==
Writer Manfred Petzold submitted his script to DEFA on 19 July 1958, under the title Celestial Wink. Beside of complying with the ideological demands of the time, by portraying the collectivization of farms in a positive manner - Joshua Feinstein cited the picture among DEFA's "mission films", that had unambiguous political aims - it also took a highly critical position of the Catholic Church. The village priest, Melchior, was depicted as the main antagonist, who fiercely opposed the notion that his flock would join the communal farm, fearing that he would lose influence. The DEFA Board resisted this aspect of the plot, being concerned that it would offend Christian farmers and hinder the efforts to have them join the LPG's. The Film Production Commission recommended to make the priest less reactionary. But the figure of Melcior was only slightly more sympathetic in the script's new version, submitted on 11 June 1959 and subsequently approved. Principal photography took place from 17 June until 14 August of that year. A special screening was held for Hans Seidowsky, an official of the Department for Church and State Relations. He concluded that the plot must be significantly altered to avoid having the conflict between the values of Christianity and communism as the main subject of the film. On 30 March 1960, a final edition of the script was approved, leaving the priest with little impact on the events. An intensive process of editing removed all the problematic scenes. In one part of the film, where it was impossible to cut out a sequence in which old Grandma Kalhow had a vision of the Holy Virgin riding on a white cow, strong background noise was added to make her words inaudible. The title Celestial Wink was changed to No Trouble with Cleopatra, to dissuade any connotation to religious issues.

== Reception ==
The picture was poorly received by the audience: it sold only 20,142 tickets in the first week after its release - merely 13.1% of those available. The management of DEFA demanded a "critical evaluation" of the work made on the film.

West German author Heinz Kersten regarded No Trouble with Cleopatra as one of the "poorly made" DEFA films that "damaged its artists' reputation." The German Film Lexicon described it as "hopelessly outdated even in the time of its making... a completely amaturish piece of work." The German Catholic Film Service critic saw it as one of the most important pictures about the East German attitude to religion, that still presented Christianity as an important factor in the people's psyche, and was not as anti-catholic as several later films. Alexander Seibold, who researched the depiction of Catholics in East German cinema, quotes a contemporary review saying that the film "clearly intended to turn the Church into a subject of laughter." Renate Holland-Moritz and Regine Sylvester claimed that rather than a comedy, it was a film about the recent history of the country. Film scholar Ralf Schenk placed No Trouble with Cleopatra among the few DEFA pictures which portrayed a conflict between the superstitious, reactionary elements in society - identified with religion - and the enlightened, progressive ones - identified with the communists.
