= Alfons Zitterbacke =

1966 film

- Directed by: Konrad Petzold
- Written by: Gerhard Holtz-Baumert (novel)
- Release date: 1966
- Country: East Germany
- Language: German

Alfons Zitterbacke is an East German film. It was released in 1966.
