= Alvington =

Alvington may refer to:

- Alvington, Gloucestershire
- Alvington, Somerset
- HMS Alvington, a ship of the Royal Navy
- West Alvington, a village near Kingsbridge in South Devon
- Alvington, Somerton Park, the beachfront home of William Bickford (1841-1919) in Adelaide, South Australia
