= Heinz Thiel =

German film director

- Born: 10 May 1920; Magdeburg, Germany
- Died: 9 March 2003 (aged 82); Potsdam, Germany
- Occupations: Film director, screenwriter
- Years active: 1956-1977

Heinz Thiel (10 May 1920 – 9 March 2003) was a German film director and screenwriter. He directed more than 20 films between 1956 and 1977. His 1967 film Bread and Roses was entered into the 5th Moscow International Film Festival.

== Selected filmography ==
- Special Mission (1959)
- Five Days, Five Nights (1960)
- Reserved for the Death (1963)
- Schwarzer Samt (1964)
- Bread and Roses (1967)
- Hart am Wind (1970)
