= Hatifa =

1960 film

- Directed by: Siegfried Hartmann
- Written by: Willi Meinck (novel)
- Release date: 1960
- Country: East Germany
- Language: German

Hatifa is an East German film. It was released in 1960.
