= Ralf Kirsten =

German film director (1930–1998)

- Born: 30 May 1930; Leipzig, Germany
- Died: 23 January 1998 (aged 67); Berlin, Germany
- Occupations: Film director, screenwriter
- Years active: 1955–1986

Ralf Kirsten (30 May 1930 – 23 January 1998) was a German film director and screenwriter. He directed 22 films between 1955 and 1986. His 1984 film Where Others Keep Silent was entered into the 14th Moscow International Film Festival.

== Life and career ==
After doing an apprenticeship as an electrician, Kirsten went to university to study German literature and theatre, first at Humboldt University of Berlin, and later the Theater Institute in Weimar. He then went on to study film direction at the Film and TV School of the Academy of Performing Arts in Prague (FAMU) alongside fellow East German Frank Beyer. He graduated in 1956, and began working in television.

In 1960, Kirsten joined DEFA, the state-owned film studio of the German Democratic Republic (GDR), where he had previously produced both his FAMU diploma film, Bärenburger Schnurre (English: Bärenburger Farce), and his first feature film, Skimeister von morgen (English: Ski Champions of the Future). His first film for DEFA was Steinzeitballade (English: Stone Age Ballad), an experimental film about rubble women in post-war Berlin, which was well received by critics. In 1961 Kirsten found popular success with Auf der Sonnenseite (English: On the Sunny Side), a comedy about a factory worker who dreams of becoming a star, featuring Manfred Krug in the lead role. Kirsten and Krug would go on to collaborate on several other films.

In 1966, Kirsten directed a film adaptation of Der verlorene Engel, a Franz Fuhmann novel about sculptor Ernst Barlach. The film was initially banned, and was only shown in public for the first time in 1970, with a general release the following year. Kirsten made several films about historical figures, including 1984's Where Others Keep Silent, about the early 20th century German communist leader Clara Zetkin.

When DEFA closed following the reunification of Germany, Kirsten taught at the Konrad Wolf Film University of Babelsberg. He died in Berlin on 23 January 1998.

== Filmography ==
- Bärenburger Schnurre (Bärenburger Farce, 1957)
- Skimeister von morgen (Ski Champions of the Future, 1957)
- Steinzeitballade (Stone Age Ballad, 1960)
- Auf der Sonnenseite (On the Sunny Side, 1961)
- Beschreibung eines Sommers (It Happened One Summer, 1962)
- Mir nach, Canaillen! (Follow Me, Scoundrels, 1964)
- Der verlorene Engel (The Lost Angel, 1966, released 1971)
- Frau Venus und ihr Teufel (Lady Venus and Her Devil, 1967)
- Netzwerk (Network, 1969)
- Zwei Briefe an Pospischiel (Two Letters for Pospischiel, TV mini-series, 1970)
- Elexire des Teufels (The Devil’s Elixir, 1972)
- Junger Mann (Young Man, TV, 1973)
- Unterm Birnbaum (Under the Pear Tree, 1973)
- Eine Pyramide für mich (A Pyramid for Me, 1975)
- Ich zwing dich zu leben (I'll Force You to Live, 1977)
- Lachtauben weinen nicht (Doves Don’t Cry, 1979)
- Wo andere schweigen (Where Others Keep Silent, 1984)
- Käthe Kollwitz – Bilder eines Lebens (Käthe Kollwitz: Images of a Life, 1986)
