= Horst E. Brandt =

German film director

- Born: 17 January 1923; Berlin, Germany
- Died: 22 August 2009 (aged 86); Potsdam, Germany
- Occupations: Film director, cinematographer
- Years active: 1954–1989

Horst E. Brandt (17 January 1923 – 22 August 2009) was a German film director and cinematographer. His 1967 film Bread and Roses was entered into the 5th Moscow International Film Festival. His 1975 film Between Day and Night was entered into the 9th Moscow International Film Festival.

== Selected filmography ==
Director

- Bread and Roses (1967)
- KLK Calling PTZ – The Red Orchestra (1971)
- Between Day and Night (1975)

Cinematographer

- Stärker als die Nacht (1954)
- Special Mission (1959)
- SAS 181 Does Not Reply (1959)
- A Lively Christmas Eve (1962)
- Reserved for the Death (1963)
- Schwarzer Samt (1964)
- Solange Leben in mir ist (1965)
