= List of films set in Berlin =

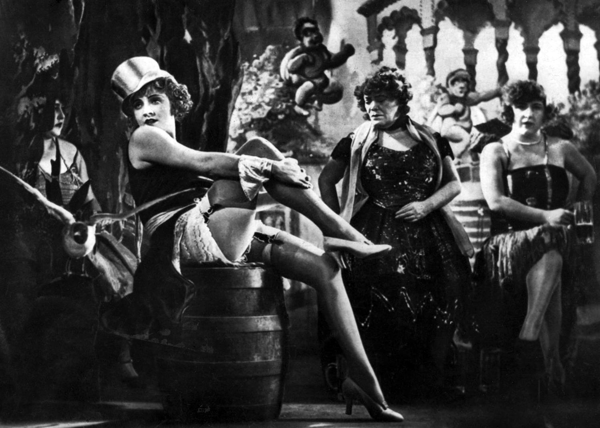
The Blue Angel (1930). Berlin is the setting and filming location of numerous movies, and has been since the beginnings of the silent film era.

Berlin is a major center in the European and German film industry. It is home to more than 1000 film and television production companies and 270 movie theaters. Three hundred national and international co-productions are filmed in the region every year. Babelsberg Studios and the production company UFA are located outside Berlin in Potsdam.

The city is also home of the European Film Academy and the German Film Academy, and hosts the annual Berlin International Film Festival which is considered to be the largest publicly attended film festival in the world. This is a list of films whose setting is Berlin.

== 1920s ==
=== 1922 ===
- Dr. Mabuse the Gambler (Dr. Mabuse, der Spieler), 1922 – first (silent) film about the character Doctor Mabuse from the novels of Norbert Jacques, by Fritz Lang.

=== 1924 ===
- The Last Laugh (Der Letzte Mann), 1924 – the aging doorman at a Berlin hotel is demoted to washroom attendant but gets the last laugh, by F.W. Murnau.

=== 1925 ===
- Slums of Berlin (Die Verrufenen), 1925 – an engineer in Berlin is released from prison, but his father throws him out, his fiancée left him and there is no chance to find work. Directed by Gerhard Lamprecht.
- Variety (Varieté), 1925 – circus melodrama set in Berlin, with the circus scenes in the Berlin Wintergarten, by Ewald André Dupont.

=== 1926 ===
- The Last Horse Carriage in Berlin (Die letzte Droschke von Berlin), 1926 – showing the life of an old coachman in Berlin still driving the droshky during the time when the automobile arises. Directed by Carl Boese.
- People to Each Other (Menschen untereinander), 1926 – in a typical Berlin town house the residents manifold lives from different social backgrounds are shown. Directed by Gerhard Lamprecht.

=== 1927 ===
- Berlin: Symphony of a Metropolis (Berlin: Die Sinfonie der Großstadt), 1927 – expressionist documentary film of 1920s Berlin by Walter Ruttmann.
- Metropolis, 1927 – Berlin-inspired futuristic classic by Fritz Lang.

=== 1928 ===
- Refuge (Zuflucht), 1928 – a lonely and tired man comes home after several years abroad, lives with a market-woman in Berlin and starts working for the Berlin U-Bahn. Directed by Carl Froelich.

=== 1929 ===
- Asphalt, 1929 – the Berlin underworld touches a policeman's life, film noir classic by Joe May.
- Mother Krause's Journey to Happiness (Mutter Krausens Fahrt ins Glück), 1929 – depicts the cruelty of poverty in Wedding district and Communism as a rescuing force that reaches a mother and a child too late. Directed by Phil Jutzi.

== 1930s ==
=== 1930 ===
- Cyanide (Cyankali), 1930 – a poor female office employee in Berlin gets pregnant, but abortion is not allowed in the Weimar Republic. So she goes to a quack doctor who applies toxic potassium cyanide to her. Directed by Hans Tintner.
- People on Sunday (Menschen am Sonntag), 1930 – avant-garde look at daily life in Berlin, screenplay by Billy Wilder and Curt Siodmak.
- The Three from the Filling Station (Die drei von der Tankstelle), 1930 – three friends are broke, so they sell their car and open a filling station in Berlin. Then they all fall in love with the same girl. Directed by Wilhelm Thiele.

=== 1931 ===
- 1914 (1914, die letzten Tage vor dem Weltbrand), 1931 – after the Assassination of Archduke Franz Ferdinand of Austria – during the July Crisis – Wilhelm II in Berlin, Nicholas II in Russia and the Sovereigns and diplomats of other Great powers unsuccessfully try to prevent World War I. Directed by Richard Oswald.
- Berlin-Alexanderplatz, 1931 – first film adaption of the novel Berlin Alexanderplatz from Alfred Döblin, directed by Phil Jutzi.
- The Captain from Köpenick (Der Hauptmann von Köpenick), 1931 – directed by Richard Oswald and based upon the play The Captain of Köpenick by Carl Zuckmayer. The play was based on the true story of Wilhelm Voigt.
- Emil and the Detectives (Emil und die Detektive), 1931 – adventure film based on the novel Emil and the Detectives by Erich Kästner. Director: Gerhard Lamprecht.
- M, 1931 – Berlin thriller by Fritz Lang; beginnings of film noir and the endings of expressionism.
- The Man in Search of His Murderer (Der Mann, der seinen Mörder sucht), 1931 – a man in Berlin plunged in debt makes a suicide attempt and has to hire a murderer to kill him within twelve hours. But in the same night he falls in love with a girl who wants to stop the appointed killer. Directed by Robert Siodmak.

=== 1932 ===
- Grand Hotel, 1932 – nothing ever happens at the Grand Hotel. Directed by Edmund Goulding. Academy Award for Best Picture (1931–1932). Filmed in Hollywood.
- Kuhle Wampe, 1932 – about a working-class family in Berlin in 1931 where survival is difficult during the Great Depression. Directed by Slatan Dudow.

=== 1933 ===
- Hitlerjunge Quex, 1933 – Hans Steinhoff propaganda drama about a boy in the Hitler Youth.
- The Testament of Dr. Mabuse (Das Testament des Dr. Mabuse), 1933 – Berlin thriller by Fritz Lang.
- Tugboat M 17 (Schleppzug M 17), 1933 – the skipper of a tugboat on the river Havel falls for a female thief in Berlin and leaves his family for her. Directed by Heinrich George and Werner Hochbaum.

=== 1936 ===
- The Violet of Potsdamer Platz (Das Veilchen vom Potsdamer Platz), 1936 – a flower girl working at Potsdamer Platz can resolve a financial deception. Directed by Johann Alexander Hübler-Kahla.

=== 1937 ===
- Charlie Chan at the Olympics, 1937 – Charlie Chan trails spies to Berlin during the 1936 Summer Olympics. Starring Warner Oland.
- Dangerous Crossing (Gleisdreieck), 1937 – at Gleisdreieck station a woman wants to throw herself under a subway train but is saved by a railway official. By Robert A. Stemmle.
- The Divine Jetta (Die göttliche Jette), 1937 – a typical Berlin revue singer gets celebrated at the Königsstädtisches Theater when a young Earl wants to marry her and take her to his home in Tyrol. Directed by Erich Waschneck.
- His Best Friend (Sein bester Freund), 1937 – a policeman in Berlin finds a German Shepherd, buys it from its owner and trains it to become a police dog. During one operation though, their collaboration gets challenged. Directed by Harry Piel.

=== 1938 ===
- The Four Companions (Die vier Gesellen), 1938 – after graduation, four female art students in Berlin attempt to set up their own advertising agency. They swear an oath to concentrate on business, but then each of them finds secretly a husband to marry. Directed by Carl Froelich.
- A Night in May (Eine Nacht im Mai), 1938 – a young woman in Berlin had to turn in her driver's license and gets involved in an accident when she drives anyway. A young man convinces her to flee with him onto a bus tour to Wannsee. Directed by Georg Jacoby.
- Olympia (Parts 1 & 2), 1938 – strikingly aesthetic propaganda by Leni Riefenstahl.
- The Roundabouts of Handsome Karl (Die Umwege des schönen Karl), 1938 – a young waiter comes to Berlin in 1930 to serve at the best wine restaurant, and he tries unsuccessfully to get into high society. Directed by Carl Froelich.
- The Stars Shine (Es leuchten die Sterne), 1938 – musical revue about a young secretary who leaves the country and travels to Berlin to seek work as an actress. Directed by Hans H. Zerlett.
- Urlaub auf Ehrenwort, 1938 – four soldiers have a brief furlough in Berlin late in 1918, on their promise to return to their troop train in time. Propaganda film by Karl Ritter

== 1940s ==
=== 1940 ===
- Night Train to Munich, 1940
- Wunschkonzert, 1940 – during the 1936 Summer Olympics in Berlin a young girl and a Luftwaffe Fliegerleutnant meet and fall in love. They want to marry, but he receives orders to go to the Condor Legion. Three years later they meet again during World War II via the popular radio music show Wunschkonzert für die Wehrmacht. Directed by Eduard von Borsody.

=== 1941 ===
- Friedemann Bach, 1941 – Wilhelm Friedemann Bach, eldest son of Johann Sebastian Bach, is shown as a gifted son trying to escape his father's shadow. After Friedemann was rejected as a musician in several cities, he lives a miserable life in Berlin where he died in 1784. Directed by Traugott Müller.
- The Gasman (Der Gasmann), 1941 – a gas meter reader in Berlin during World War II is suspected of being a foreign spy. Directed by Carl Froelich.
- Symphonie einer Weltstadt (Berlin – Wie es war), late 1930s documentary view of Berlin by Leo de Laforgue. First shown in 1950.

=== 1942 ===
- Andreas Schlüter, 1942 – biopic on famous architect Andreas Schlüter who built the Berlin Stadtschloss for Frederick I of Prussia during the 18th century. Directed by Herbert Maisch.
- Berlin Correspondent, 1942 – an American radio correspondent is hunted for sending coded messages out on the airwaves from Berlin. Directed by Eugene Forde.
- Die Entlassung, 1942 – showing the growing estrangement between Emperor Wilhelm II and Reichskanzler Otto von Bismarck, Bismark's dismissal in Berlin in March 1890 and the intrigues by Geheimrat von Holstein from Auswärtiges Amt. Directed by Wolfgang Liebeneiner.
- The Great Love (Die große Liebe), 1942 – a Wehrmacht Oberleutnant is stationed in North Africa as a fighter pilot. While in Berlin to deliver a report he sees a popular Danish singer on the stage of a cabaret theatre and starts a painful relationship with her. It was Germany's most successful motion picture produced during the second world war. Directed by Rolf Hansen.
- Two in a Big City (Zwei in einer großen Stadt), 1942 – a sergeant from the Wehrmacht and a nurse (working at the local Red Cross station) meet accidentally at Friedrichstraße station and spend one day together in Berlin. Directed by Volker von Collande.

=== 1943 ===
- I Entrust My Wife to You (Ich vertraue dir meine Frau an), 1943 – a man asks a friend to keep a jealous watch over his wife in Berlin during a business trip with his secretary, what causes several adventures for the caring friend. Directed by Kurt Hoffmann.
- The Life and Death of Colonel Blimp, 1943 – in 1902, a British Lieutenant is on leave from the Boer War and travels to Berlin to work against anti-British propaganda. After a duel with a German officer the two recover near Stölpchensee and become friends for the next 40 years. Directed by Michael Powell and Emeric Pressburger.
- Melody of a Great City (Großstadtmelodie), 1943 – a young and talented female photographer from a provincial Bavarian town comes to Berlin and falls in love with a very busy journalist. Directed by Wolfgang Liebeneiner.

=== 1944 ===
- The Buchholz Family (Familie Buchholz), 1944 – based on the novels by Julius Stinde. During the German Empire the resolute mother of a Berlin middle-class family wants to get her two daughters married befitting their social rank, and she writes her first novel about her experiences. Directed by Carl Froelich.
- Es lebe die Liebe, 1944 – a famous operetta star wants to engage a Spanish dancer for his Apollo Theater in Berlin, but she gets ill for one year. After her mandatory break she comes to Berlin and creeps into his theatre and his life under a different name. Directed by Erich Engel.
- Marriage of Affection (Neigungsehe), 1944 – following Familie Buchholz, the resolute mother Buchholz tries unsuccessfully to marry her remaining daughter via a marriage advertisement in the newspaper, but the daughter celebrates a secret wedding with a painter on Heligoland island. Directed by Carl Froelich.
- Philharmoniker, 1944 – in late 1920s Berlin the financial situation of Berlin Philharmonic orchestra is precarious. One of the violinists leaves the orchestra to play in a light music ensemble, but returns after Nazi Machtergreifung. Directed by Paul Verhoeven.
- Under the Bridges (Unter den Brücken), 1944/45 – two men and a woman shipping on the river Havel shortly before Berlin gets totally destroyed. Directed by Helmut Käutner.

=== 1945 ===
- Fall of Berlin – 1945, 1945 – Soviet propaganda documentary film about the Battle of Berlin. Footage of the actual battle is shown, as the Red Army fights the Nazis, building by building. The assault on the Reichstag ends with the famous photograph, raising the Red Flag over the Reichstag. Directed by Yuli Raizman and Yelizaveta Svilova.
- Hotel Berlin, 1945 – near the close of World War II, a member of the German underground escapes from the Gestapo and takes shelter at Hotel Berlin. Directed by Peter Godfrey.

=== 1946 ===
- Murderers Among Us (Die Mörder sind unter uns), 1946 – the first post-WWII Trümmerfilm. Directed by Wolfgang Staudte.
- Somewhere in Berlin (Irgendwo in Berlin), 1946 – drama about children in post-war Berlin. Directed by Gerhard Lamprecht.

=== 1947 ===
- And the Heavens Above Us (...und über uns der Himmel), 1947 – a man comes home after World War II into destroyed Berlin and starts working as a black market trader. With Hans Albers, directed by Josef von Báky.
- In Those Days (In jenen Tagen), 1947 – in this Rubble film an old car built in 1933 tells its story and episodes from its seven owners, mostly located in Berlin, during the years of Nazi Germany. Directed by Helmut Käutner.
- Marriage in the Shadows (Ehe im Schatten), 1947 – a German actor is successful in Berlin during the Nazi era, but extreme pressure is applied on him by the authorities to divorce his Jewish wife, also an actress. When she is going to be deported, they take poison together. Based on the life of Joachim Gottschalk and directed by Kurt Maetzig.
- Raid (Razzia), 1947 – crime thriller about black market traders in Berlin. A spy forewarns everybody before the police arrives and a police commissar gets murdered. Directed by Werner Klingler.

=== 1948 ===
- Berlin Express, 1948 – murder mystery with scenes from bombed-out Frankfurt and Berlin, directed by Jacques Tourneur.
- The Berliner (Berliner Ballade), 1948 – daily life of a veteran home from the war. Director Robert A. Stemmle.
- A Foreign Affair, 1948 – romantic comedy set in Berlin during the Allied occupation; stars Jean Arthur and Marlene Dietrich; directed by Billy Wilder.
- Germany, Year Zero (Deutschland im Jahre Null), 1948 – filmed in German amidst the ruins of the bombed-out city of Berlin, then dubbed into Italian (with subtitles). A masterpiece of neo-realism, by Roberto Rossellini.
- Street Acquaintances (Straßenbekanntschaft), 1948 – in postwar Berlin, young women want to make a living and long for men, joy and love. But in their promiscuity they often become the carrier for sexually transmitted diseases. Directed by Peter Pewas.
- Und wieder 48, 1948 – students of the Humboldt University of Berlin take part as extras in a movie about the Revolutions of 1848 in the German states. Directed by Gustav von Wangenheim.

=== 1949 ===
- The Cuckoos (Die Kuckucks), 1949 – five orphaned siblings in destroyed Berlin cannot find a domicile for longer periods. So they refurbish with high personal contribution a villa in Grunewald district, though the legal position concerning property is not clear. Directed by Hans Deppe.
- Girls in Gingham (Die Buntkarierten), 1949 – the fate of a typical working-class family in Berlin between 1883 and 1949 facing child labour, trade union engagement, war, depression, unemployment and the rise and fall of Nazism. Directed by Kurt Maetzig.
- Our Daily Bread (Unser täglich Brot), 1949 – about the difficult life of an extended family in destroyed Berlin in 1946. Directed by Slatan Dudow.
- Rotation, 1949 – showing the life of a mechanic in Berlin between 1920 and 1945. During the Third Reich, as a member of the Nazi Party, he aids a resistance group in printing anti-war propaganda and is finally turned into the authorities by his own son who is a frenetic member of the Hitler Youth. Directed by Wolfgang Staudte.

== 1950s ==
=== 1950 ===
- The Big Lift, 1950 – stars Montgomery Clift in the Berlin Air Lift. Film by George Seaton.
- The Fall of Berlin, 1950 – two-part Soviet propagandistic feature film. The plot revolves around the history of the Great Patriotic War and the Battle of Berlin, focusing on the role that Joseph Stalin played in the events. Directed by Mikheil Chiaureli.

=== 1951 ===
- Zugverkehr unregelmäßig, 1951 – a member of the Volkspolizei and a supervisor at Berlin S-Bahn are friends and roommates. But one day the supervisor quits his job and collaborates with agents from West Berlin who sabotage the S-Bahn services to embarrass the GDR. Directed by Erich Freund.

=== 1952 ===
- All Clues Lead to Berlin, 1952 – Film noir about a young American lawyer who discovers a gang of counterfeiters in Berlin and gets hunted himself. By František Čáp.
- Frauenschicksale, 1952 – a dandy and womanizer from West Berlin seduces women in East Berlin who are looking for happiness and a good man. One of them gets pregnant, another woman steals for him. Directed by Slatan Dudow.
- Story of a Young Couple (Roman einer jungen Ehe), 1952 – a young married couple – both actors – work in Cold War Berlin. She is on location in East Berlin, and he works at a theatre in West Berlin. As they hold more and more opposed views on politics, art and society, their marriage is in danger of breaking up. Directed by Kurt Maetzig.

=== 1953 ===
- The Man Between, 1953 – stars James Mason. Atmospheric East/West thriller filmed in bomb-torn Berlin. Directed by Carol Reed.
- No Way Back (Weg ohne Umkehr), 1953 – in 1945 a Red Army officer discovers a frightened girl huddled in a Berlin cellar. He gives her a safe escort home and wins her gratitude. Seven years later they meet again in the divided city. Directed by Victor Vicas.
- Die Unbesiegbaren, 1953 – from 1889 to 1890 August Bebel and Wilhelm Liebknecht as members of the Social Democrats at Reichstag fight against the Anti-Socialist Laws shoulder to shoulder with workers from Borsig locomotive works in Berlin.

=== 1954 ===
- Alarm in the Circus (Alarm im Zirkus), 1954 – two boys from West Berlin are too poor for higher education and they are both desperate to purchase real boxing gloves. A gangster offers to pay them if they would assist him to steal valuable horses from a circus in East Berlin. Directed by Gerhard Klein.
- Canaris, 1954 – portrays real events during World War II when Admiral Wilhelm Canaris, the head of the Abwehr in Berlin, was arrested and executed for his involvement with the 20 July Plot to overthrow Adolf Hitler. Directed by Alfred Weidenmann.
- Captain Wronski (Rittmeister Wronski), 1954 – an indebted Polish cavalry captain works undercover in 1930s Berlin to discover Nazi Germany's plans against his homeland by seducing secretaries at the Ministry of the Reichswehr. Based on the life of Jerzy Sosnowski and directed by Ulrich Erfurth.
- Emil and the Detectives (Emil und die Detektive), 1954 – adventure film directed by Robert A. Stemmle, based on the novel Emil and the Detectives by Erich Kästner.
- The Life of Surgeon Sauerbruch (Sauerbruch – Das war mein Leben), 1954 – showing the work of famous senior surgeon Ferdinand Sauerbruch at the teaching hospital Charité in Berlin with several flashback scenes about his former labour. Directed by Rolf Hansen.
- Night People, 1954 – during the Cold War a counter-intelligence officer of the United States Army has to recover a young G.I. in Berlin who was hauled off to the East by the Soviets. Directed by Nunnally Johnson.

=== 1955 ===
- The Devil's General (Des Teufels General), 1955 – a Luftwaffe General, who is critical of the Third Reich in 1941 Berlin, is slowly suspect of what may be treason. Based on the play by Carl Zuckmayer and directed by Helmut Käutner.
- Hotel Adlon, 1955 – episodic movie about the exclusive Hotel Adlon, Unter den Linden, before World War II, its guests and the working staff. Directed by Josef von Báky.
- I Am A Camera, 1955 – set in the early 1930s depicting Weimar Berlin from the writings of Christopher Isherwood; film by Henry Cornelius.
- Jackboot Mutiny (Es geschah am 20. Juli), 1955 – about the failed July 20 Plot to kill Adolf Hitler by a bomb placed at Wolf's Lair by Claus von Stauffenberg, which led to the execution of several resistance group members at the Berlin Bendlerblock. Directed by Georg Wilhelm Pabst.
- The Last Ten Days (Der letzte Akt), 1955 – about the last days of Adolf Hitler at the Führerbunker during the Battle of Berlin. Directed by Georg Wilhelm Pabst.
- The Plot to Assassinate Hitler (Der 20. Juli), 1955 – feature film on the failed July 20, 1944 attempt at assassinating Adolf Hitler. The film has a realism that comes close to the style of a documentary. Directed by Falk Harnack.
- Die Ratten, 1955 – based upon the play The Rats by Gerhart Hauptmann and telling the story of a destitute Polish woman in Berlin who sells her illegitimate baby for a few hundred Deutsche Mark to a childless forwarder's wife. Directed by Robert Siodmak.
- The Three from the Filling Station (Die drei von der Tankstelle), 1955 – three friends are broke, so they sell their car and open a filling station in Berlin. Then they all fall in love with the same girl. Directed by Hans Wolff.

=== 1956 ===
- A Berlin Romance (Eine Berliner Romanze), 1956 – about youth urban life in the divided city of Berlin. The film is a love story about a seventeen-year-old East German saleswoman and an unemployed auto mechanic from West Berlin. Directed by Gerhard Klein.
- The Captain from Köpenick (Der Hauptmann von Köpenick), 1956 – directed by Helmut Käutner and based upon the play The Captain of Köpenick by Carl Zuckmayer. The play was based on the true story of Wilhelm Voigt.
- Teenage Wolfpack (Die Halbstarken), 1956 – a portrait of rebellious young people in Berlin during the 1950s. Directed by Georg Tressler.
- Treffpunkt Aimée, 1956 – a group of criminals smuggles PVC declared as cement from East Berlin to West Berlin until the Volkspolizei becomes suspicious. Directed by Horst Reinecke.

=== 1957 ===
- Banktresor 713, 1957 – during the Wirtschaftswunder two unsuccessful and unequal brothers plan a bank robbery in Berlin by digging a tunnel. Directed by Werner Klingler.
- Berlin, Schoenhauser Corner (Berlin – Ecke Schönhauser...), 1957 – drama by Gerhard Klein about anti-establishment teens in East Berlin.
- The Devil Strikes at Night (Nachts, wenn der Teufel kam), 1957 – based on the true story of Bruno Lüdke, a supposed serial killer who murdered women during the Nazi era. An investigator in 1944 Berlin who starts to get a thread which leads to Lüdke is frustrated by Nazi authorities who feel that revealing the truth will undermine the people's faith in the system. Directed by Robert Siodmak.
- Different from You and Me (Anders als du und ich / Das dritte Geschlecht), 1957 – a young man in postwar Berlin discovers his homosexuality but his own family tries very hard to set him straight. Directed by Veit Harlan.
- Don't Forget My Little Traudel (Vergeßt mir meine Traudel nicht), 1957 – a lonely 17-year-old girl escapes from a children's home, comes to Berlin and upsets the life of a teacher and a policeman sharing the same flat. Directed by Kurt Maetzig.
- Lissy, 1957 – a poor girl from a working-class family in Berlin-Wedding marries a successful Nazi. But her social advancement gets along with the loss of old friends. Directed by Konrad Wolf.
- Old Barge, Young Love (Alter Kahn und junge Liebe), 1957 – a skipper leads a small group of barges travelling from Berlin to Waren. Directed by Hans Heinrich.
- Queen Louise (Königin Luise), 1957 – depicts the life of Louise of Mecklenburg-Strelitz in Berlin, the wife of Frederick William III of Prussia, and her stand against Napoleon during the Napoleonic Wars. Directed by Wolfgang Liebeneiner.
- Die Schönste, 1957 – two boys in West Berlin stash their own mothers' jewellery to find out whether the ladies are still admirable or not. Directed by Ernesto Remani.
- Sheriff Teddy, 1957 – a boy has to move with his family from West Berlin to East Berlin, but has problems to assimilate. His new friend helps him not to become a delinquent minor. Directed by Heiner Carow.
- Spring in Berlin, 1957 – two days in Berlin. Directed by Arthur Maria Rabenalt.

=== 1958 ===
- Endstation Liebe, 1958 – a young factory worker in West Berlin is a lady-killer and does not believe in true love until he meets the love of his life during a bet. Directed by Georg Tressler.
- Fräulein, 1958 – German woman and American officer caught up in the end of and aftermath of World War II in Berlin. Directed by Henry Koster.
- Iron Gustav (Der eiserne Gustav), 1958 – based on the novel by Hans Fallada and telling the true story of horse-drawn cabman Gustav Hartmann from Wannsee district who drove sensationally to Paris in 1928 to demonstrate against the rise of the motorcar taxicab. Directed by George Hurdalek.
- My Wife Makes Music (Meine Frau macht Musik), 1958 – a revue singer in East Berlin paused for several years because of her family when she meets an Italian star who brings her back to theatre. But her husband is not amused about her new career. Directed by Hans Heinrich.
- Nasser Asphalt, 1958 – a young reporter in West Berlin discovers that his employer, a respected and prosperous journalist, invented a sensational story of German soldiers who supposedly survived for six years in a demolished bunker in Poland. Directed by Frank Wisbar.
- Solang noch Untern Linden, 1958 – biography of famous chanson and operetta composer Walter Kollo working at the Berliner Theater and the Admiralspalast. Directed by his son Willi Kollo; grandson and opera tenor René Kollo played his own grandfather.
- Sun Seekers (Sonnensucher), 1958, released 1972 – after being arrested in a police raid in 1950 Berlin, two young prostitutes are sent to the mines of Wismut Company. There, Germans and Soviets work together to extract Uranium for the use of the Soviet Union. Directed by Konrad Wolf.
- Tatort Berlin, 1958 – illustrates the advantage for criminals with the still passable inner German border but also the problems with separate police investigations inside Berlin. In the movie a new jurisdiction is seen to help with the resocialisation of former petty criminals into the system of the GDR. Directed by Joachim Kunert.
- The Young Lions, 1958 – a German ski instructor is hopeful that Adolf Hitler will bring new prosperity to Germany, so when war breaks out he joins the Wehrmacht and travels to Berlin several times. In another story line two soldiers befriend each other during their U.S. Army draft physical examination and attend basic training together. Directed by Edward Dmytryk.

=== 1959 ===
- Goods for Catalonia (Ware für Katalonien ), 1959 – a group of smugglers transfers cameras, lenses and field glasses made in GDR via East Berlin to West Berlin and then to Barcelona. Based upon the true story of criminal Hasso Schützendorf and directed by Richard Groschopp.
- Interview mit Berlin, 1959 – for the 10th anniversary of the GDR produced documentary on contemporary economical and cultural life in Berlin. Directed by Max Jaap.
- Love's Confusion (Verwirrung der Liebe), 1959 – a medical student at Berlin Humboldt University misses his girlfriend at a masquerade and finds a new girl. His former girlfriend takes the former boyfriend of the student's new girl instead. Before wedding they again switch partners. Directed by Slatan Dudow.
- Reportage 57, 1959 – drawing on negative depictions of Halbstarke and Rock 'n' roll in West Berlin in its critiques of the West. Directed by János Veiczi.
- Sie nannten ihn Amigo, 1959 – in 1939 a refugee from a Nazi concentration camp is discovered by some boys in Berlin. The son of a communist helps him, gets arrested himself and sent to a concentration camp. Directed by Heiner Carow.
- Ten Seconds to Hell, 1959 – focuses on a half-dozen German POWs who return to a devastated Berlin and find employment as a bomb disposal squad, tasked with clearing the city of unexploded Allied bombs. Directed by Robert Aldrich.

== 1960s ==
=== 1960 ===
- Am grünen Strand der Spree, 1960 – five friends meet in a bar in postwar Berlin and share their experiences during World War II. Directed by Fritz Umgelter.
- Freddy and the Melody of the Night (Freddy und die Melodie der Nacht), 1960 – a singing taxi driver in West Berlin helps to catch two criminals who unsuccessfully attacked a cash transport, and he falls in love with a flower girl. Directed by Wolfgang Schleif.
- Sweetheart of the Gods (Liebling der Götter), 1960 – biographical film based on the life of German film actress Renate Müller. Torn between her success during the early Nazi era and her love to a Jewish diplomat she dies in 1937 under mysterious circumstances. Directed by Gottfried Reinhardt.
- We Cellar Children (Wir Kellerkinder), 1960 – about people in postwar Berlin, their careers during the Wirtschaftswunder and what they did before 1945 during the Nazi era. Directed by Hans-Joachim Wiedermann.

=== 1961 ===
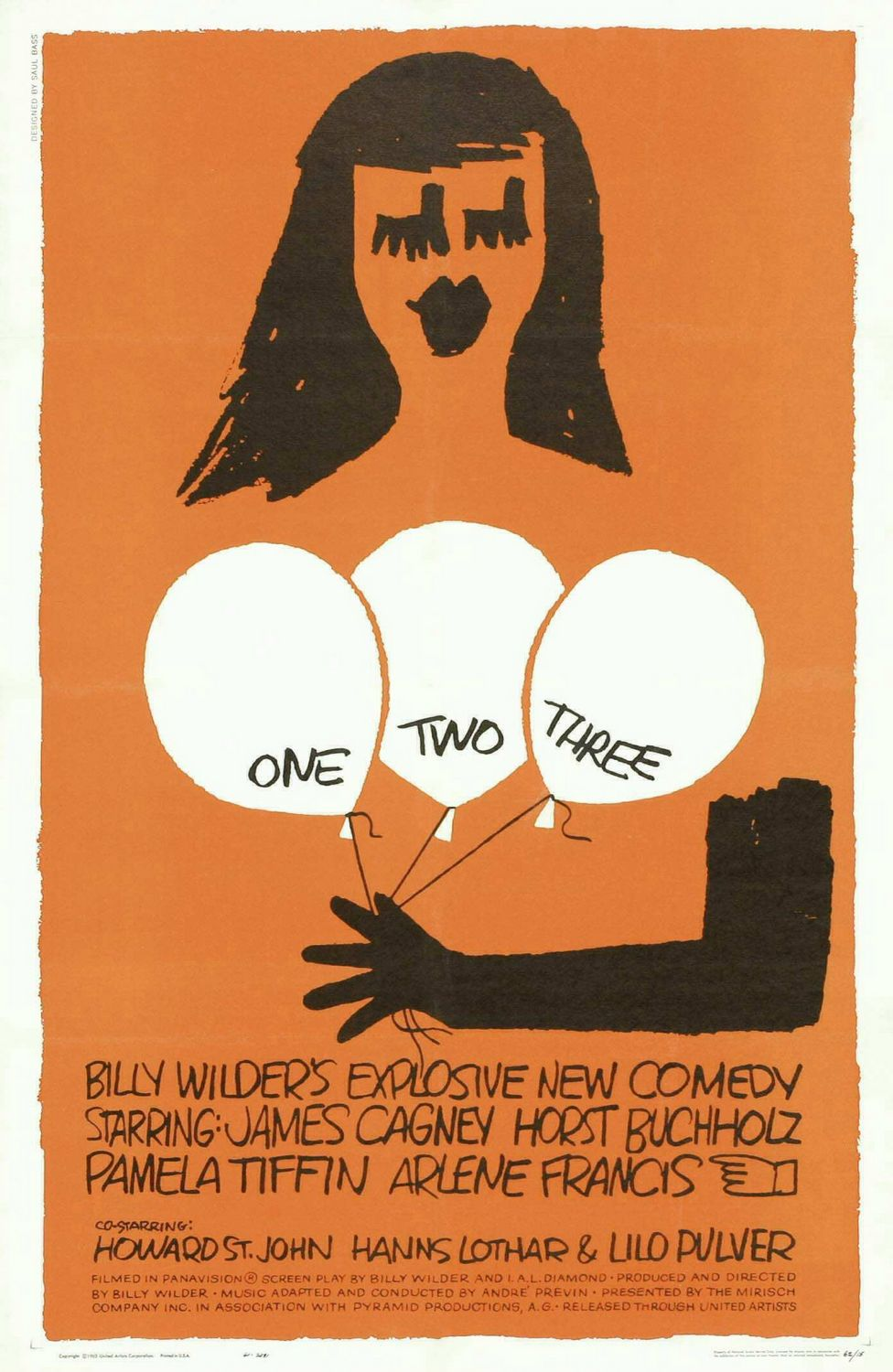
One, Two, Three, 1961

- Escape to Berlin (Flucht nach Berlin), 1961 – to escape the formation of a Landwirtschaftliche Produktionsgenossenschaft, a farmer and a communist agitator in East Germany try to flee to West Berlin. Directed by Will Tremper.
- My Husband, the Economic Miracle (Mein Mann, das Wirtschaftswunder), 1961 – to bring his daughter to her senses, a Wirtschaftswunder tycoon in West Berlin celebrates a sham marriage with a Hungarian actress. But after the wedding his wife starts to lick him into shape. Written by Dieter Hildebrandt and directed by Ulrich Erfurth.
- One, Two, Three, 1961 – Cold War before The Wall, comedy by Billy Wilder.
- Two Among Millions (Zwei unter Millionen), 1961 – a love story in Berlin shortly before the Berlin Wall is built. Directed by Wieland Liebske and Victor Vicas.

=== 1962 ===
- The Bread of Those Early Years (Das Brot der frühen Jahre), 1962 – telling the story of a young man in West Berlin during the Wirtschaftswunder. Directed by Herbert Vesely.
- Escape from East Berlin, 1962 – drama about a group of people from East Berlin who dig a tunnel under Berlin Wall to take refuge in West Berlin. Directed by Robert Siodmak.
- Her Most Beautiful Day (Ihr schönster Tag), 1962 – a typical feisty female concierge in Berlin has to learn that her own children do not prosper as desired. Directed by Paul Verhoeven.
- Midnight Revue (Revue um Mitternacht), 1962 – a film producer shuts a writer, a composer, a dramatic adviser and a stage designer into a villa, but they can manage to escape. Another young composer and a production assistant have to bring them back to finish the revue movie. Directed by Gottfried Kolditz.
- The Punch to the Jaw (Der Kinnhaken), 1962 – a woman lives in East Berlin and works in a West Berlin bar when the Wall is built in 1961. Directed by Heinz Thiel.
- Star-Crossed Lovers (Königskinder), 1962 – two children from working-class families in Berlin have sworn to marry each other. When they grow older, after the Nazis rose to power, he is arrested for being a Communist, but she joins the underground party to continue his work. Directed by Frank Beyer.
- The Tunnel, 1962 – acclaimed NBC documentary about an escape tunnel under the Berlin Wall, by Reuven Frank.
- ...und Deine Liebe auch, 1962 – two friends love the same girl. One of them is working as an electrician in East Berlin, the other is a cab driver in West Berlin. When the Wall is built, the girl has to make a decision. Directed by Frank Vogel.

=== 1963 ===
- The Endless Night (Die endlose Nacht), 1963 – six people are stuck at Berlin Tempelhof Airport because of deep fog. Directed by Will Tremper.
- For Eyes Only, 1963 – spy film about a double agent from the Stasi who is placed in the West German headquarters of MID. He regularly travels to Berlin, and he finally can carry the United States plans to invade the GDR to East Germany. Directed by János Veiczi.

=== 1964 ===
- Emil and the Detectives, 1964 – adventure film directed by Peter Tewksbury, based on the novel Emil and the Detectives by Erich Kästner.
- Gigant Berlin, 1964 – documentary movie about West Berlin made 1957–1963, showing the building of Berlin Wall, and John F. Kennedy and Marlene Dietrich visiting the cosmopolitan city. Directed by Leo de Laforgue.
- Wolf Among Wolves (Wolf unter Wölfen), 1964 – the four-part TV film based on the novel Wolf Among Wolves by Hans Fallada describes the Hyperinflation in the Weimar Republic in 1923 which led to widespread unemployment, homelessness, starvation and rioting in Berlin. Directed by Hans-Joachim Kasprzik.

=== 1965 ===
- Berlin um die Ecke, 1965 – about conflicts between young and old metal workers in East Berlin. Directed by Gerhard Klein and first shown in 1990.
- Born in '45 (Jahrgang '45), 1965 – a young couple from Prenzlauer Berg tries to get a divorce. He drifts through the city while she suffers from separation. Directed by Jürgen Böttcher and first shown in 1990.
- The Dirty Game, 1965 – the US intelligence chief in Europe relates the stories of three different operations during the Cold War that he was involved in with colleagues in Berlin, Paris, Rome and Djibouti. Directed by Christian-Jaque, Werner Klingler, Carlo Lizzani and Terence Young.
- Karl Liebknecht (Part 1: Solange Leben in mir ist, 1965; Part 2: Trotz alledem!, 1972) – two part film about the German Communist leader Karl Liebknecht. Directed by Günter Reisch.
- El niño y el muro, 1965 – film about a child and The Wall, directed by Ismael Rodríguez.
- The Rabbit Is Me (Das Kaninchen bin ich), 1965 – the brother of a young waitress in East Berlin is sentenced to three years in prison because of "subversive agitation", and therefore she is not allowed to study. To find out the truth, the waitress starts a secret relationship with the judge. Directed by Kurt Maetzig and first shown in 1989.
- The Spy Who Came In from the Cold, 1965 – Cold War classic set on both sides of The Wall, from the book by John le Carré, directed by Martin Ritt.

=== 1966 ===
- Funeral in Berlin, 1966 – spy film adapted from the book by Len Deighton, starring Michael Caine, directed by Guy Hamilton.
- Großer Ring mit Außenschleife, 1966 – a tramway driver in West Berlin is fired by the BVG because of 'his health status' though he never was ill. To attract attention he abstracts tramcars by night and drives them through the city. Directed by Eugen York.
- Honour Among Thieves (Ganovenehre), 1966 – comedy about the panderer and crime environment in 1925 Berlin during the Weimar Republic. Directed by Wolfgang Staudte.
- The Quiller Memorandum, a 1966 spy film starring George Segal, directed by Michael Anderson.
- That Woman (Playgirl), 1966 – about a model discovering Berlins nightlife. By Will Tremper.
- Torn Curtain, 1966 – Cold War thriller set in East Berlin, directed by Alfred Hitchcock.

=== 1967 ===
- Casino Royale, 1967 – comedy spy film spoofing James Bond in which Bond's estranged daughter has to travel to East Berlin to infiltrate a Soviet counterintelligence agency. Directed by Ken Hughes, John Huston, Joseph McGrath, Robert Parrish, Val Guest and Richard Talmadge.
- Hallo, Du altes Spreeathen, 1967 – musical revue about an elderly Berlin organ grinder and his daughter visiting goddess Luna, with many famous songs paying homage to the city. Directed by Wernfried Hübel.
- Ein Lord am Alexanderplatz, 1967 – telling the story of a marriage swindler and his daughter in Berlin during the time when the Alexanderplatz was rebuilt and the Fernsehturm was erected. Directed by Günter Reisch.
- Der tapfere Schulschwänzer, 1967 – a schoolboy in East Berlin decides to skip school, incidentally discovers a fire, alerts the fire department but runs off before they can note down his personal data. The firefighters manage to save two infants from burning and search for the young hero. Directed by Winfried Junge.
- Wedding Night in the Rain (Hochzeitsnacht im Regen), 1967 – a young female hairdresser and horse fan from the Baltic Sea comes to East Berlin to become a jockey at Rennbetrieb Hoppegarten. To get a flat she marries a moped rider she just met the day before. Directed by Horst Seemann.

=== 1968 ===
- Berliner Antigone, 1968 – during World War II a young woman is sentenced to death at Plötzensee Prison by the People's Court because she stole the dead body of her insurgent brother from the Anatomic Institute to bury him secretly. Based on the novel by Rolf Hochhuth and directed by Rainer Wolffhardt.
- A Dandy in Aspic, a 1968 espionage film set in East and West Berlin, directed by Anthony Mann.
- I Was Nineteen (Ich war neunzehn), 1968 – a nineteen-year-old Red Army soldier's experiences as the Soviets advance into Berlin at the close of World War II, directed by Konrad Wolf.
- Ich – Axel Cäsar Springer, 1968–1970 – the life and work of conservative publisher Axel Springer and the rise of Axel Springer Verlag from the early beginnings in Hamburg until the expansion to West Berlin, seen from a propagandistic East German point of view. Directed by Achim Hübner, Ingrid Sander and Helmut Krätzig.
- Quartet in Bed (Quartett im Bett), 1968 – nonsense movie about the 1968 bohemian society in Kreuzberg district. Directed by Ulrich Schamoni.
- The Wicked Dreams of Paula Schultz, 1968 – Cold War spy farce about an East German Olympic athlete who defects. Director George Marshall.

=== 1969 ===
- Liberation, 1969 – five-part movie on the liberation of the Soviet Union and the defeat of Nazi Germany in the Great Patriotic War, focusing on the Battle of Kursk, the Lower Dnieper Offensive, Operation Bagration, the Vistula–Oder Offensive and the Battle of Berlin. Directed by Yuri Ozerov.
- That Guy Loves Me, Am I Supposed to Believe That? (Der Kerl liebt mich – und das soll ich glauben?), 1969 – an erratic young woman in West Berlin can not pay her rent and hooks up with a criminal, antiques smuggling man. Directed by Marran Gosov.

== 1970s ==
=== 1970 ===
- Berlin Affair, a 1970 spy film starring Darren McGavin, directed by David Lowell Rich.
- Gentlemen in White Vests (Die Herren mit der weißen Weste), 1970 – a criminal comes home to West Berlin and gets hunted by a retired judge and his friends. Directed by Wolfgang Staudte.
- He, Du!, 1970 – a dedicated female teacher in East Berlin calls a meeting when she realizes that the younger pupils are not any more touched by the events happening in the novel Naked Among Wolves. Directed by Rolf Römer.
- Me, a Groupie (Ich – ein Groupie), 1970 – two blonde English girls hook up with rock musicians and travel through Europe smuggling drugs. When they finally reach West Berlin the journey ends in a drug orgy. Directed by Erwin C. Dietrich.

=== 1971 ===
- Husaren in Berlin, 1971 – Hungarian hussars under András Hadik occupy Berlin for one day in the 1757 Berlin raid during the Seven Years' War before the Prussian Army arrives. Directed by Erwin Stranka.
- Ich werde dich töten, Wolf, 1971 – a young woman travels to West Berlin to kill her former boyfriend. On the journey she looks back on the relationship with him when she murdered his wife at Grunewald Tower. Directed by Wolfgang Petersen.
- It Is Not the Homosexual Who Is Perverse, But the Society in Which He Lives (Nicht der Homosexuelle ist pervers, sondern die Situation, in der er lebt), 1971 – follows the adventures of a young man in Berlin who discovers gay culture but also discrimination and fear. Directed by Rosa von Praunheim.
- KLK Calling PTZ – The Red Orchestra (KLK an PTX – Die Rote Kapelle), 1971 – after Hitler's rise to power, a group of regime opponents called Red Orchestra consolidates under the leadership of Harro Schulze-Boysen and Arvid Harnack in Berlin. They gather intelligence and pass it on to other countries. In August 1942, the Gestapo arrests Boysen and cracks down on the spy ring. Directed by Horst E. Brandt.
- Our Willi Is the Best (Unser Willi ist der Beste), 1971 – now retired and being hard-pressed for money, a former tax collector in West Berlin becomes a door-to-door salesman. But his selling methods to distribute home appliances are quite contentious. Directed by Werner Jacobs.

=== 1972 ===
- Cabaret, 1972 – set in the early 1930s depicting Weimar Berlin from the writings of Christopher Isherwood; film by Bob Fosse.
- Dear Mother, I'm All Right (Liebe Mutter, mir geht es gut), 1972 – a metalworker moves from Württemberg to West Berlin, does not like the disunity among the workers there and mobilises his co-workers to fight for their rights. Directed by Christian Ziewer.
- Florentiner 73, 1972 – a young pregnant woman hunting for a room in East Berlin finds a furnished through room in Pankow district. The landlady is like a mother to her, and she gets more and more integrated into the collective of the apartment house. Directed by Klaus Gendries.
- Her Third (Der Dritte), 1972 – a mother in her mid-thirties in East Berlin has two children from two different men. She now decides to find "her third" husband herself and not leaving it up to fate. Directed by Egon Günther.
- Leichensache Zernik, 1972 – in 1948 a young woman is murdered in a Berlin forest. Police stations in the different sectors of Berlin discuss about responsibility what provokes the killer to proceed. Directed by Gerhard Klein and Helmut Nitzschke.
- Der Mann, der nach der Oma kam, 1972 – after grandmothers remarriage an artist family in East Berlin has to find a new home help and nanny and hires a young talented man who turns out to be a postgraduate writing about emancipation. Director: Roland Oehme.
- Memories of a Summer in Berlin (Erinnerung an einen Sommer in Berlin), 1972 – American novelist Thomas Wolfe visits the 1936 Summer Olympics in Berlin where his enthusiasm for Germany and its merits changes to scepticism. Based on a chapter of the novel You Can't Go Home Again and directed by Rolf Hädrich.
- Shot on Command – The Sass Brothers, Once Berlin's Big Crooks (Auf Befehl erschossen – Die Brüder Sass, einst Berlins große Ganoven), 1972 – Franz and Erich Sass from Moabit district become the most famous and innovative bank robbers during 1920s Berlin. After a series of criminal acts in Denmark they get arrested, extradited to Nazi Germany and executed. Directed by Rainer Wolffhardt.

=== 1973 ===
- Berliner Bettwurst, 1973/1975 – by Rosa von Praunheim.
- The Death of Adolf Hitler, 1973 – details the last ten days of Hitler's life as World War II comes to an end and Allied troops are closing in on the Berlin Führerbunker. Directed by Rex Firkin.
- Hitler: The Last Ten Days, 1973 – depicting the days leading up to Adolf Hitler's suicide. Directed by Ennio De Concini.
- The Legend of Paul and Paula (Die Legende von Paul und Paula), 1973 – love story set in East Berlin by Heiner Carow.

=== 1974 ===
- Der Leutnant vom Schwanenkietz, 1974 – three-part movie on the life and work of an ambitious Volkspolizei-Abschnittsbevollmächtigter in East Berlin who puts things straight and tries to rehabilitate former criminals. Directed by Rudi Kurz.
- Neues aus der Florentiner 73, 1974 – following Florentiner 73, the young woman in Pankow gives birth to a baby, has to find the right husband and experiences rising support by the collective in her apartment house. Directed by Klaus Gendries.
- One or the Other of Us (Einer von uns beiden), 1974 – psychological thriller takes place in West Berlin, with scenes near the wall. Director Wolfgang Petersen.
- Salon Kitty, 1974 – covering the events of the Salon Kitty Incident, where the Sicherheitsdienst took over a brothel in Charlottenburg between 1939 and 1942, had the place wire tapped and all the prostitutes replaced with trained spies in order to gather data on various members of the Nazi party and foreign dignitaries. Directed by Tinto Brass.
- Top Hat (Chapeau Claque), 1974 – a young former Top hat manufacturer became insolvent and lives now as a man of independent means and rummage collector in his house in Grunewald district together with a listless young girl. Directed by Ulrich Schamoni.

=== 1975 ===
- Everyone Dies Alone (Jeder stirbt für sich allein), (1975 in German; 1976 in English) – Hans Fallada's novel based on the lives of Otto and Elise Hampel, who undertook acts of civil disobedience against Nazism in 1940. Directed by Alfred Vohrer.
- Inside Out, 1975 – heist thriller in which a gang led by former American and German soldiers recovers Nazi gold buried in Berlin during WWII.
- Under the Pavement Lies the Strand (Unter dem Pflaster ist der Strand), 1975 – two Berlin actors are accidentally locked in the rehearsal hall for one night. He tries to seduce her; she puts him off. Together they have to face the loss of ideals from the German student movement. Directed by Helma Sanders-Brahms.

=== 1976 ===
- Hostess, 1976 – a young woman in East Berlin is leading sight-seeing tours, and she rejects her boyfriends' proposal of marriage due to his lovelessness. Directed by Rolf Römer.
- Memories of Berlin: The Twilight of Weimar Culture, 1976 – documentary about Berlin's cultural scene during the Weimar Republic, by Gary Conklin.
- Nelken in Aspik, 1976 – a totally untalented advertising artist in East Berlin climbs the social ladder by just remaining silent after a mischance with his teeth. Directed by Günter Reisch.

=== 1977 ===
- Die Comedian Harmonists – Sechs Lebensläufe, 1977 – two-part documentary on the lives of five singers and a pianist who met 1928 in Friedenau district and formed the ensemble Comedian Harmonists. Directed by Eberhard Fechner.
- Drei Damen vom Grill, 1977 – grandmother, mother and daughter run a Currywurst takeaway in West Berlin at Nollendorfplatz, later in Westend and finally in Moabit Markthalle. Directed by Thomas Engel, Hans Heinrich and others.
- Liebeserklärung an Berlin, 1977 – two-part documentary about people loving Berlin, Hauptstadt der DDR. The movie portraits construction workers, members of the Volkspolizei, lavatory attendants, students, industrial workers, children and others who talk about their life, about rebuilding the city and developing a socialistic society. Directed by Uwe Belz.
- The Serpent's Egg, 1977 – an unemployed Jew in 1923 Berlin is offered a job by a professor performing medical experiments, foreshadowing Nazi human experimentation. Directed by Ingmar Bergman.
- Stroszek, 1977 – based on the life of and played by Bruno Schleinstein. A street performer and petty criminal in West Berlin gets released from prison, but is unable to start a new life. Together with his girlfriend, a prostitute, and his elderly neighbor, he moves to Wisconsin, but cannot forge ahead. Directed by Werner Herzog.

=== 1978 ===
- The All-Around Reduced Personality – Outtakes (Die allseitig reduzierte Persönlichkeit – Redupers), 1978 – a female freelance press photographer has to survive at subsistence level with her daughter in West Berlin when she becomes part of a project to deliver photos of Berlin. Directed by Helke Sander.
- Despair, 1978 – against the backdrop of the Nazis' rise, a Russian émigré and chocolate magnate in Berlin goes slowly mad. Directed by Rainer Werner Fassbinder.
- Du und icke und Berlin, 1978 – a typical eleven-year-old girl from East Berlin wants to find a new father and makes a match between her mother and a construction worker. Directed by Eberhard Schäfer.
- Just a Gigolo (Schöner Gigolo, armer Gigolo), 1978 – a Prussian officer returns home to Berlin following the end of World War I. Unable to find employment elsewhere, he works as a gigolo in a brothel run by a Baroness. With David Bowie and Marlene Dietrich, by David Hemmings.
- Ein Mann will nach oben, 1978 – a man and his friends establish a baggage transportation service between the Berlin railway terminal stations before World War I. The movie in 13 parts is based on the novel by Hans Fallada and directed by Herbert Ballmann.
- Das Versteck, 1978 – having been divorced for one year, a lonely man in East Berlin tries to reconquer his former wife and pretends to be pursued by the Volkspolizei. But the reworking of their old problems becomes complicated. Directed by Frank Beyer.

=== 1979 ===
- David, 1979 – in 1938 the son of a Jewish rabbi is sent from his home in Legnica to Berlin to learn mechanics and agriculture. During World War II he can hide in the city until he manages to escape to Palestine. Directed by Peter Lilienthal.
- The End of the Rainbow (Das Ende des Regenbogens), 1979 – a 17 year old Berlin boy turns prostitute and petty thief. Despite the attempts of a social worker to help, the boy runs into real trouble when a burglary goes awry. Directed by Uwe Frießner.
- Für Mord kein Beweis, 1979 – the dead body of a woman from Prenzlauer Berg found at Langer See leads the Volkspolizei to a hiding doctor who practised during the Nazi Euthanasia programme at Dachau concentration camp. Directed by Konrad Petzold.
- Geheime Reichssache, 1979 – documentary on the trials of August 1944, led by Roland Freisler and held by the People's Court at the Kammergericht in the aftermath of the 20 July plot that year. Directed by Jochen Bauer.
- The Great Runaway (Die große Flatter), 1979 – three-part movie on two young men who grow up in a difficult family background in a settlement for socially disadvantaged in Charlottenburg-Nord. Their residential milieu drives them to petty crime, but they dream of moving away. Based on the novel of Leonie Ossowski and directed by Marianne Lüdcke.
- The Marriage of Maria Braun (Die Ehe der Maria Braun), 1979 – a woman trying to make a life in the aftermath of WWII by Rainer Werner Fassbinder.
- Pinselheinrich, 1979 – episodes from the life of famous Berlin illustrator Heinrich Zille. Zille gets dismissed from his work, starts to live from his humorous and socially critical drawings but uses his earnings and rising fame to help people who are poorer than him. Directed by Hans Knötzsch.
- Die Schulmädchen vom Treffpunkt Zoo, 1979 – Schulmädchen-Report-like comedy about schoolgirls meeting friends at Berlin Zoologischer Garten railway station in West Berlin. One of the girls loves a male prostitute and junkie and tries to help him with money. Directed by Walter Boos.
- The Third Generation (Die dritte Generation), 1979 – a black comedy about the activities of the third generation of the left wing terror group RAF in Berlin. Written and directed by Rainer Werner Fassbinder.
- Verführungen, 1979 – after a Status Quo concert at Deutschlandhalle, an unoriented teenage couple in West Berlin meets the would-be juvenile owner of an unsuccessful antiques shop. But their friendship leads to disappointment. Directed by Michael Verhoeven.

== 1980s ==
=== 1980 ===
- Backhouse Bliss (Glück im Hinterhaus), 1980 – a fairly well-off librarian in his mid-forties with two children and a boring marriage in Berlin leaves his family for his intern. But the spark doesn't show up in his day-to-day life. Directed by Herrmann Zschoche.
- Berlin Alexanderplatz, 1980 – 1920s Berlin, film of the novel written by Alfred Döblin. Made for television film (in 14 episodes) by Rainer Werner Fassbinder.
- Berlin Chamissoplatz, 1980 – love story between an older architect and a young student, set against the backdrop of the housing struggles in West Berlin. Director: Rudolf Thome.
- Fabian, 1980 – in the late 1920s Berlin a copywriter observes the night life with his friend, gets unemployed during the Great Depression, but meets a new girlfriend. When his friend commits suicide and his girlfriend leaves him for a film career, he loses his livelihood. Based on the novel by Erich Kästner and directed by Wolf Gremm.
- Put on Ice (Kaltgestellt), 1980 – a teacher in West-Berlin gets neutralized during the time of Anti-Radical Decree and dragnet investigation when he wants to throw light on the death of a spy sent to his school by the Verfassungsschutz. Directed by Bernhard Sinkel.
- Solo Sunny, 1980 – portraits the life of a girl singing in a band in East Berlin, directed by Konrad Wolf.
- Ullasa Paravaigal, 1980 – The protagonist visits Berlin and rest of Europe as a part of overseas tour for a change over of his mind due to his tragic past with his friend, who pretends to have mental disorder. The film written by Panchu Arunachalam, produced by S. P. Thamizharasi and directed by C. V. Rajendran.
- Germany, Pale Mother (Deutschland, bleiche Mutter), 1980 – a mother and her daughter have to survive World War II in Berlin while her husband is fighting in the Wehrmacht. After the war their relationship ist not the same any more. Directed by Helma Sanders-Brahms.

=== 1981 ===
- Als Unku Edes Freundin war, 1981 – during the 1920s a circus driven by Sinti comes to the outskirts of Berlin. A Sinti girl becomes the friend of a poor German boy who tries to buy a bicycle to earn money for his family as a paperboy. Based on the novel Ede und Unku by Alex Wedding. Directed by Helmut Dziuba.
- Am Wannsee ist der Teufel los, 1981 – young Punks, Rockers and Poppers are heading for Wannsee, where they are getting in conflict with middle-class citizens and the police. Directed by Caspar Harlan.
- Angels of Iron (Engel aus Eisen), 1981 – dramatizes the true story of a Berlin gang of thieves led by juvenile Werner Gladow with his partner in crime, former hangman Gustav Völpel, during the time of the Berlin Blockade and Airlift 1948–49. Directed by Thomas Brasch.
- Berlin Tunnel 21, 1981 – a former American officer leads an attempt to build a tunnel underneath The Wall as a rescue route. Directed by Richard Michaels.
- The Bunker, 1981 – depicting the events surrounding Adolf Hitler's last weeks in and around the Führerbunker in Berlin. Directed by George Schaefer.
- Christiane F. – We Children from Bahnhof Zoo (Christiane F. – Wir Kinder vom Bahnhof Zoo), 1981 – 1970s portrayal of West Berlin's drug scene by Uli Edel.
- Lili Marleen, 1981 – during the Third Reich a German singer (based on the life of Lale Andersen), famous for singing Lili Marleen, and a Swiss Jewish composer (based on Rolf Liebermann), who actively helps an underground group of German Jews, form a forbidden love, although she lives an assimilated life in Berlin. Directed by Rainer Werner Fassbinder.
- The Man in Pyjamas, 1981 – after watching TV with his wife, a man from Wilmersdorf district goes to the cigarette machine in pyjamas. On the street he gets caught by the police and the complications begin. Directed by Christian Rateuke and Hartmann Schmige.
- Possession, 1981 – a woman left her family and the husband starts following his wife to find out the truth. Directed by Andrzej Żuławski.
- Strike Back (Kalt wie Eis), 1981 – a young criminal in West Berlin takes the rap for a gang of motorbike thieves and ends up in jail. Nearly insane with frustration he makes a violent escape to be with his girlfriend. Directed by Carl Schenkel.
- Taxi zum Klo, 1981 – groundbreaking film documenting gay culture in West Berlin by Frank Ripploh.

=== 1982 ===
- Ace of Aces (L'as des as), 1982 – the coach of the French Boxing team travels to the 1936 Summer Olympics in Berlin. But before the competition he is asked to help a persecuted Jewish family to escape from Bavaria to Austria. Directed by Gérard Oury.
- Domino, 1982 – the life of an actress in West Berlin gets crazy when she quits her job at Schiller Theater. A stage director wants to work with her at the Hebbel Theater, but he dies before rehearsals begin. Directed by Thomas Brasch.
- Familie Rechlin, 1982 – a typical Berlin family lives at Hackescher Markt, but shortly before the wall is built, the daughter and her husband move to Ruhleben-Spandau in West Berlin. After the wall is erected the two parts of the family get alienated from another in two different systems. Directed by Vera Loebner.
- The Man on the Wall (Der Mann auf der Mauer), 1982 – a man in East Berlin tries unsuccessfully to get over Berlin Wall. After he is ransomed by the West-German Government, he wants for his beloved wife. Directed by Reinhard Hauff.
- Sabine Kleist, Aged Seven... (Sabine Kleist, 7 Jahre...), 1982 – a seven-year-old girl has spent her childhood in an orphanage after her parents died in an accident. When one of the women in charge at the orphanage leaves to have a baby, the girl runs away, wanders through East Berlin, but finds no one to take her in. Directed by Helmut Dziuba.
- Spuk im Hochhaus, 1982 – in the 18th century a landlord and a landlady always rob their guests. So they are accursed to do seven good deeds exactly 200 years later in modern East Berlin. Directed by Günter Meyer.

=== 1983 ===
- City of Lost Souls (Stadt der verlorenen Seelen), 1983 – by Rosa von Praunheim.
- Conrad: The Factory-Made Boy (Konrad aus der Konservenbüchse), 1983 – when a woman in Neukölln district opens the tin that was delivered by a factory, a well-behaved 7-year-old "instant boy" climbs out. When the factory spots the wrong delivery, the new son has to learn impertinence. Directed by Claudia Schröder.
- Frontstadt, 1983 – fragmentary portrait on young people's lives in West Berlin. Directed by Klaus Tuschen.
- Island of Swans (Insel der Schwäne), 1983 – a fourteen-year-old boy has to move from an idyllic small town to the developing area of Berlin-Marzahn where his father works as a construction worker and where he must find his way in a completely new environment and surrounded by strange people. Directed by Herrmann Zschoche.
- Non Stop Trouble with Spies (Der Schnüffler), 1983 – a naive taxi driver in West Berlin is asked to bring a Russian man to East Berlin. When they arrive, the man turns out to be already dead and the driver is suspected of being a CIA spy. Back in West Berlin he is accused of being a KGB agent, and so the imbroglio begins. Directed by Ottokar Runze.
- Octopussy, 1983 – James Bond film starring Roger Moore and directed by John Glen.
- White Star, 1983 – a former rock 'n' roll band manager tries very aggressively to promote a young musician in West Berlin, but the punk audience does not like the synthpop-style music. Directed by Roland Klick.
- White Trash (Kanakerbraut), 1983 – several days in the life of an unemployed man in Kreuzberg district, spending his days with peep shows, local pub, loose contacts, sitting at home and occasional jobs. Directed by Uwe Schrader.
- A Woman in Flames (Die flambierte Frau), 1983 – leaving her upper class, boring marriage, a woman in West Berlin is drawn to the idea of becoming a call girl and a disrespectful dominatrix. But then she falls in love with a charming gigolo. Directed by Robert van Ackeren.
- Zille and Me (Zille und ick), 1983 – musical film using fictional episodes from the life of famous Berlin social-critical painter Heinrich Zille around the year 1900. Directed by Werner W. Wallroth.

=== 1984 ===
- Forbidden, 1984 – about a wealthy German countess who hides her Jewish boyfriend in her apartment in Berlin during World War II. Directed by Anthony Page.
- The Jesse Owens Story, 1984 (TV) – biographical film of the life and times of 1936 Olympics star Jesse Owens, by Richard Irving.
- Siggi, the Street Cleaner (Sigi, der Straßenfeger), 1984 – a street sweeper finds a box with 300.000 Deutsche Mark and a compromising photo of his boss what evokes several adventures. With Harald Juhnke, by Wolf Gremm.
- The Wannsee Conference (Die Wannseekonferenz), 1984 (TV) – German film about the infamous WWII conference in Berlin-Wannsee where the Final Solution to exterminate the Jews was planned. Directed by Heinz Schirk.

=== 1985 ===
- The Berlin Affair (Interno Berlinese / Leidenschaften), 1985 – in 1938 the wife of a rising Nazi diplomat in Berlin falls in love with the daughter of the Japanese Ambassador. Her husband finds out and moves to break up the affair, but also gets enamoured of the girl. Based upon the novel Quicksand and directed by Liliana Cavani.
- Demons (Dèmoni), 1985 – horror movie about people in a Berlin cinema transforming into demons. Directed by Lamberto Bava.
- Girl in a Boot (Einmal Ku’damm und zurück), 1985 – a woman from East Berlin falls in love with a Swiss cook working at the Swiss embassy, travels with him secretly to Kurfürstendamm, but opts to stay at her side of the wall. Directed by Herbert Ballmann.
- The Holcroft Covenant, 1985 – 40 years after the Battle of Berlin, an architect of German origin from New York City has to meet a German conductor at Berliner Philharmonie to establish a charitable foundation for Holocaust survivors with Nazi money. Directed by John Frankenheimer.
- Kein Mord, kein Totschlag, 1985 – documentary showing authentic police and fire service emergency operations in Wedding district, with family grudges, suicide attempts, noise disturbances etc. Directed by Uwe Schrader.
- Richy Guitar, 1985 – a young guitar player in Berlin wants to become a famous musician and attempts to establish a band. Featuring punk band Die Ärzte and singer Nena; directed by Michael Laux.
- Westler, 1985 – telling the story of a homosexual student from West Berlin who falls in love with a guy from East Berlin. Directed by Wieland Speck.
- Wild Geese II, 1985 – based on the 1982 novel The Square Circle by Daniel Carney, in which a group of mercenaries are hired to spring Rudolf Hess from Spandau Prison. Directed by Peter R. Hunt.

=== 1986 ===
- Du mich auch, 1986 – in West-Berlin a Swiss guitar player and a female saxophonist from Berlin live and work together. They perpetually discuss about staying together or separating and look up to couples who live together permanently. Directed by Helmut Berger, Anja Franke and Dani Levy.
- Fatherland, 1986 – a protest singer is a persona non grata in East Germany, he emigrates to West Berlin and gets exploited by an American record company. Together with a young French journalist he travels to Cambridge to find his father who turns out to be a former Nazi war criminal. Directed by Ken Loach.
- Liebling Kreuzberg, 1986–1998 – series with five seasons, altogether 58 episodes. Leading actor: Manfred Krug as a Berlin lawyer. Director: Werner Masten.
- Meier, 1986 – comedy about a paper hanger in East Berlin who buys a counterfeit West-German passport, which he does not use to escape from East Germany, but to provide his crafts enterprise with wallpaper material from West-Berlin. Directed by Peter Timm.
- Rosa Luxemburg, 1986 – Polish socialist and marxist Rosa Luxemburg dreams about revolution during the era of German Wilhelminism. While Luxemburg campaigns relentlessly for her beliefs, getting repeatedly imprisoned in Germany and Poland, lovers and comrades betray her until she is assassinated in Berlin together with Karl Liebknecht in 1919. Directed by Margarethe von Trotta.

=== 1987 ===
- Claire Berolina, 1987 – portrait of Claire Waldoff who became a famous cabaret singer in 1920s Berlin and was a close friend of composer Walter Kollo, writer Kurt Tucholsky and illustrator Heinrich Zille. She was an important part of cultural and lesbian life in Berlin until the Nazi Machtergreifung ended her success. Directed by Klaus Gendries.
- In der Wüste, 1987 – showing one day in the life of a jobless Chilean in West-Berlin spending time with his Turkish friend and searching for food and love. Based on a novel by Antonio Skármeta and directed by Rafael Fuster Pardo.
- Reichshauptstadt – privat, 1987 – two-part docudrama about a man and a woman who meet in Berlin and look back on their love story in the fascistic Reichshauptstadt between 1937 and 1945. Directed by Horst Königstein.
- Wings of Desire (Der Himmel über Berlin), 1987 – drama about an angel falling in love with a human, which also concerns the divided city and its fate by Wim Wenders.

=== 1988 ===
- Cycling the Frame, 1988 – documentary and art film following Tilda Swinton and her thoughts as she circumnavigates West Berlin alongside the Wall on a bicycle. Directed by Cynthia Beatt and remade in 2009.
- A Father's Revenge, 1988 – two Americans (played by Brian Dennehy and Ron Silver) are hunting German terrorists. Directed by John Herzfeld.
- Hanussen, 1988 – while recovering from being wounded during World War I, the Doctor discovers that Austrian Klaus Schneider possesses empathic powers. After the war, Schneider changes his name into Erik Jan Hanussen and goes to Berlin to perform as a hypnotist and mind reader. When he predicts Adolf Hitler's Machtergreifung and the Reichstag fire, the Nazis murder him. Directed by István Szabó.
- Judgment in Berlin, 1988 – based on the book Judgment in Berlin telling the story of the LOT Polish Airlines Flight 165 hijacking from Gdańsk to West Berlin and the subsequent 1979 trial conducted in the United States Court for Berlin; stars Martin Sheen and Sean Penn. Directed by Leo Penn.
- Kai aus der Kiste, 1988 – during the hyperinflation in the Weimar Republic 1923 in Berlin a boy and his friends start a campaign of competitive advertising for an American chewing gum brand and use the resources of the metropolis for it. Based upon the novel by Wolf Durian and directed by Günter Meyer.
- Linie 1, 1988 – film of the 1986 musical Linie 1 about U-Bahn (subway) Linie 1 in West Berlin, by Reinhard Hauff.
- The Microscope (Das Mikroskop), 1988 – a software engineer in Berlin and his girlfriend, a flower seller, have problems with their relationship. He wants to take inspiration from a chance acquaintanceship but she fights for a real family with children. Directed by Rudolf Thome.
- The Passenger – Welcome to Germany (Der Passagier – Welcome to Germany), 1988 – in 1942 a group of KZ prisoners is cast as extras for a Nazi propaganda film. Many years later one of them returns to West Berlin to produce a documentary on this incident and his own involvement. Directed by Thomas Brasch.
- Ein Schweizer namens Nötzli, 1988 – a Swiss clerk works at a chemical plant in West Berlin for 26 years without opportunity for advancement when he finds an innominate recommendatory letter and serves it straight to his director. Directed by Gustav Ehmck.

=== 1989 ===
- The Break (Der Bruch), 1989 – in 1946 several burglars want to break into the Deutsche Reichsbahn building in Berlin to steal money from the safe. Directed by Frank Beyer.
- Coming Out, 1989 – deals with the process of the protagonists in East Berlin coming out as gay. Premiered in East Berlin on 9 November 1989, the night the Berlin Wall fell. Directed by Heiner Carow.
- flüstern & SCHREIEN, 1989 – documentary on parts of the Berlin and East German rock music scene of the late 1980s, from well-established bands like Silly, to alternative rock bands like Feeling B or Chicoree/Die Zöllner. Directed by Dieter Schumann.
- The Grass Is Greener Everywhere Else (Überall ist es besser, wo wir nicht sind), 1989 – facing the lack of prospects in their hometown Warsaw, two young people dream of living in the United States. To reach their target they do casual and illegal work in Berlin. Directed by Michael Klier.
- The Philosopher (Der Philosoph), 1989 – a philosopher in Berlin almost withdrew from the world to concentrate on his Heraclitus studies, having no relationship for eight years. When he wants a new suit for a lecture about his new book, he meets three sisters who share a house and invite him to move in to stay with them in polygamy. Directed by Rudolf Thome.
- Spider's Web (Das Spinnennetz), 1989 – based on the 1923 novel by Joseph Roth and focused on a young opportunistic Leutnant who suffered personal and national humiliation during the downfall of the German Empire, and now becomes increasingly active in the right-wing underground of the early 1920s Berlin. Directed by Bernhard Wicki.
- Wedding, 1989 – three school day friends meet after several years again in Wedding district and talk about their unsuccessful lives including a broken family, homicide and excessive indebtedness. Directed by Heiko Schier.

== 1990s ==
=== 1990 ===
- Die Architekten, 1990 – an architect in his late thirties receives his first challenging and lucrative commission to design a cultural center for a satellite town in East-Berlin when more and more people leave East Germany wearily in the late 1980s. Directed by Peter Kahane.
- Dana Lech, 1990 – a Polish woman lives in West Berlin with her German-Italian friend when she meets her previous Polish boyfriend from Warsaw during the fall of the Berlin Wall. Directed by Frank Guido Blasberg.
- Der doppelte Nötzli, 1990 – following Ein Schweizer namens Nötzli, the doltish Swiss returns to Berlin to take over the "hotel" of his twin brother who died suddenly. But after his arrival he has to realize that it is in fact a brothel with illicit earnings. Directed by Stefan Lukschy.
- Dr. M, 1990 – in the future Berlin is shocked by a series of spectacular suicides. A policeman's investigations lead him to a beautiful, enigmatic woman and the revelation of a sinister plot to manipulate the population through mass hypnosis. Directed by Claude Chabrol.
- Der König von Kreuzberg, 1990 – showing the life of a young Turkish man in Berlin who is of the opinion that he can fly. Director: Matthias Drawe.
- Latest from the DaDaeR (Letztes aus der DaDaeR), 1990 – after the Peaceful Revolution in 1989 two clowns are released from a prison in Köpenick to satirize East German life in its final days and the arrival of the German reunification. Directed by Jörg Foth.
- Die Mauer, 1990 – documentary on the last days and the deconstruction of Berlin Wall. Directed by Jürgen Böttcher.
- Ode to Joy and Freedom (Ode an die Freiheit), 1990 – documentary on the events of the Peaceful Revolution in October and November 1989 in Berlin, when the citizens of the GDR demonstrated for a political change and freedom to travel, which led to the Fall of the Berlin Wall, die Wende and finally to German reunification. Directed by Beate Schubert.
- The Plot to Kill Hitler, 1990 – a historical recreation of the 1944 attempt by several German High Command Officers led by Colonel Claus von Stauffenberg to assassinate Adolf Hitler and take control of the German government. Directed by Lawrence Schiller.

=== 1991 ===
- Berlin – Prenzlauer Berg, 1991 – documentary on the old Kiez of Prenzlauer Berg and its inhabitants between May and July 1990 before the German treaty of monetary, economic and social union came into force, with the Deutsche Mark replacing the East German Mark. Directed by Petra Tschörtner.
- Between Pankow and Zehlendorf (Zwischen Pankow und Zehlendorf), 1991 – a musical 11-year-old girl shuttles between her mother's home in eastern Pankow and her grandmother's house in western Zehlendorf during the 1950s to take piano lessons until her father returns from war captivity. Directed by Horst Seemann.
- Company Business, 1991 - A CIA operative (Gene Hackman) and a KGB operative (Mikhail Baryshnikov) must learn to trust each other as they make their way from East Berlin to France seeking answers and trying to stay alive as they find themselves being used as pawns by their respective governments.
- Ostkreuz, 1991 – a 15-year-old girl escapes to West Berlin via Hungary with her mother shortly before the fall of Berlin Wall and becomes a petty criminal to afford an own apartment. Director: Michael Klier.
- Salmonberries, 1991 – in 1969 a woman tried to escape over Berlin Wall, but her husband got shot. She emigrates to Alaska, but when the Wall falls she travels back to Berlin 21 years later with a friend to find peace in her heart. Directed by Percy Adlon.
- Something to Do with the Wall, 1991 – Berlin Wall documentary shot just before and after its fall, by Ross McElwee and Marilyn Levine.
- Stein, 1991 – a famous actor left the stage in 1968 to protest against Prague Spring. During the late 1980s as a more and more deranged he opens his house in Wilhelmsruh for punks and resistance fighters against the GDR. Directed by Egon Günther.
- Who's Afraid of Red, Yellow and Blue (Wer hat Angst vor Rot, Gelb, Blau?), 1991 – about painters in Berlin. By Heiko Schier.

=== 1992 ===
- Liberators Take Liberties (BeFreier und Befreite), 1992 – interviews with German women who were raped by Soviet soldiers during the Battle of Berlin in April and May 1945, what caused pregnancies, abortions, illegitimate children, break down in relationships, stigmatization of the women and suicides. Directed by Helke Sander.
- The Little Punker (Der kleene Punker), 1992 – animation movie about a poor punk in Berlin who starts to form a band with his friends to perform at Brandenburg Gate. Director: Michael Schaack.
- Never Sleep Again (Nie wieder schlafen), 1992 – three women travel to Berlin to attend the wedding of a female friend and discover the recently reunited city. Directed by Pia Frankenberg.
- Shining Through, 1992 – World War II spy film directed by David Seltzer, starring Michael Douglas and Melanie Griffith.

=== 1993 ===
- Faraway, So Close! (In weiter Ferne, so nah!), 1993 – sequel to Wings of Desire (1987), angels desire to be human, by Wim Wenders.
- The Innocent, 1993 – a joint CIA/MI6 operation to build a tunnel under East Berlin during the Cold War. Directed by John Schlesinger.
- The Ivory Tower (Der Elfenbeinturm), 1993 – M. works as a cook in a trendy Berlin restaurant. To say that his kitchen is busy like hell would be an understatement. Entering into a premature midlife crisis, he decides to turn his life around and write the great novel that he always felt inside him. Director: Matthias Drawe.
- Prince in Hell (Prinz in Hölleland), 1993 – a jester is giving a puppet theatre performance about a homosexual prince for the junkies at Kottbusser Tor station. Director: Michael Stock.

=== 1994 ===
- Charlie & Louise – Das doppelte Lottchen, 1994 – two girls meet on the trip to a language school in Scotland. When they find out that they are identical twins who got separated very early, they decide to switch roles. The girl from Berlin returns to Hamburg and vice versa. Based on the novel Das doppelte Lottchen by Erich Kästner and directed by Joseph Vilsmaier.
- George Stevens: D-Day to Berlin, 1994 (TV) – stirring colour documentary of the American campaign, including footage from Berlin, by George Stevens Jr.
- Linsenstraße, 1994–1998 – Director: Christiane Nalezinski.

=== 1995 ===
- Aus der Mitte, 1995 – documentary about young people in post-wall Berlin by Peter Zach.
- Gentleman, 1995 – the loss of his car and his selected woman drives a yuppie in Berlin into a little massacre among prostitutes. Directed by Oskar Roehler.
- The Promise (Das Versprechen), 1995 – two young lovers in Berlin are separated when the Berlin Wall goes up in 1961, and their stories intertwine during the three decades to German reunification. Directed by Margarethe von Trotta.
- Silent Night (Stille Nacht – Ein Fest der Liebe), 1995 – sensing their relationship is crumbling, a policeman avoids celebrating Christmas with his girlfriend and travels to Paris. Alone in their Berlin flat, she decides to drop her second lover, but her boyfriend is ringing up her constantly from Paris. Directed by Dani Levy.
- A Trick of Light (Die Gebrüder Skladanowsky), 1995 – shows the birth of cinema in Berlin where Max Skladanowsky and his brother Emil built a projector. Directed by Wim Wenders.

=== 1996 ===
- Beyond Silence (Jenseits der Stille), 1996 – the daughter of deaf-mute parents is hearing, fluent in sign language and serves as an interpreter for her parents. After she receives a clarinet from her aunt, she discovers the world of music and wants to study at a music conservatory in Berlin. Directed by Caroline Link.
- Boomtown Berlin, 1996–2003 – series of 22 movies about the changing metropolis and about people searching for happiness in Berlin. Made by students of the Deutsche Film- und Fernsehakademie Berlin for Sender Freies Berlin.
- Deathline (Der kalte Finger), 1996 – a young telephone operator at a hospital in Berlin has a second job at a sex hotline. One of her customers seems to let his imagination run wild, but nobody knows that other women have to die for that. Directed by Ralf Huettner.
- Dem deutschen Volke, 1996 – documentary on the art project Wrapped Reichstag by Christo and Jeanne-Claude who worked to convince the officials from 1971 to 1994 until the project of wrapping the Reichstag building could be realized in 1995. Directed by Jörg Daniel Hissen and Wolfram Hissen.
- The Glamorous World of the Adlon Hotel (In der glanzvollen Welt des Hotel Adlon), 1996 – docudrama on Louis Adlon who was sent to devastated Berlin in May 1945 by William Randolph Hearst to write sensational stories from the Hotel Adlon. Directed by Percy Adlon.
- Störung Ost, 1996 – documentary on the former punk subculture in East Berlin and the persecution people suffered from the Government of the German Democratic Republic. Directed by Mechthild Katzorke and Cornelia Schneider.

=== 1997 ===
- Berlin – Moskau, 1997 – a member of the Senate of Berlin wants to sell a train full of contaminated grain to the Russian mafia via a haulier. But his daughter and her boyfriend can uncover the fraud. Directed by Wolfgang F. Henschel.
- Brothers and Sisters (Geschwister – Kardeşler), 1997 – showing the life and problems of three Turkish siblings in Berlin. Director: Thomas Arslan.
- Comedian Harmonists, 1997 – a biopic about the successful German vocal group Comedian Harmonists founded in 1927 in Berlin during the Golden Twenties and domiciled there until the three Jewish members were banned from stage by the Nazi Reichsmusikkammer in 1934. Directed by Joseph Vilsmaier.
- Der Hauptmann von Köpenick, 1997 – directed by Frank Beyer and based upon the play The Captain of Köpenick by Carl Zuckmayer. The play was based on the true story of Wilhelm Voigt.
- Life Is All You Get (Das Leben ist eine Baustelle), 1997 – romantic comedy in post-unification Berlin, by Wolfgang Becker.
- Love Story: Berlin 1942, 1997 – documentary of the love affair between Felice Schragenheim and Lilly Wust, by Catrine Clay.
- Magass, 1997 – surreal comedy by Daryush Shokof. The film is about a blacklisted artist, his four romances and their pet "a Fly" which becomes their "flying angel".
- Obsession, 1997 – a female musician in Berlin is in love with a French medical scientist when she meets an English chiseller, falls also in love with him and starts a love triangle. Directed by Peter Sehr.
- Silvester Countdown, 1997 – a young Berlin couple has increasing problems to cultivate their relationship. Even on a short trip to Warsaw around the turn of the year they switch between quarrelling and getting along with each other. Directed by Oskar Roehler.

=== 1998 ===
- Angel Express, 1998 – about people restlessly seeking for the ultimate experience in late nineties Berlin. Directed by RP Kahl.
- The Berlin Airlift: First Battle of the Cold War, 1998 – documentary containing many personal recollections and eyewitness accounts of the massive humanitarian, military, and political effort known as the Berlin Airlift. Directed by Robert Kirk.
- Break Even (Plus-minus null), 1998 – a lonely building worker in Berlin falls in love with a Bosnian prostitute and she asks him to marry her for the residence authorisation. Directed by Eoin Moore.
- The Final Game (Das Finale), 1998 – terrorists cause a mass panic during the final of the DFB Cup at Berlin Olympic Stadium. Directed by Sigi Rothemund.
- A Letter Without Words, 1998 – reconstructing the life of a wealthy, Jewish amateur filmmaker in Berlin during the 1920s and early 1930s on the basis of authentic filmic material presented by her granddaughter. Directed by Lisa Lewenz.
- Live Shot (Gehetzt – Der Tod im Sucher), 1998 – a TV reporter and his trainee in Berlin are shooting for scandalous reports. When they investigate the kidnapping of a publisher's stepdaughter, they get hunted themselves. Directed by Joe Coppoletta.
- Memory of Berlin, 1998 – autobiographical essay film by John Burgan.
- Run Lola Run (Lola rennt), 1998 – drama with three alternate realities in post-reunification Berlin by Tom Tykwer.
- Solo for Clarinet (Solo für Klarinette), 1998 – in a Berlin apartment house a man is found ruffianly murdered with a clarinet. A burnt out police inspector follows a suspicious but mysterious woman and falls for her. Directed by Nico Hofmann.

=== 1999 ===
- Aimée & Jaguar, 1999 – lesbian love story set against the backdrop of war-time Berlin, by Max Färberböck.
- Apokalypso – Bombenstimmung in Berlin, 1999 – a bomb specialist runs against time to save Berlin from an atomic catastrophe, planned by a fanatic sect. Directed by Martin Walz.
- Berlin – Ecke Bundesplatz, 1999–2012 – long term documentary film project about (middle-class and other) people living around the Bundesplatz in Wilmersdorf district. Filming began in 1985. Directors: Hans-Georg Ullrich and Detlef Gumm.
- Bombs Under Berlin (Götterdämmerung – Morgen stirbt Berlin), 1999 – at a building site in Berlin a time bomb is found. A historian believes that a complete series of bombs was placed there by a Nazi special force to destroy Berlin at the end of World War II and that someone is still taking care of the bombs. Directed by Joe Coppoletta.
- Dealer, 1999 – a Turkish man in Berlin is unable to devote himself to anything other than being a criminal and a drug dealer. Directed by Thomas Arslan.
- Downhill City, 1999 – a poor Finnish guitarist travels to Berlin. There he falls in love with a female Hamburger seller from Saxony and meets other unsuccessful people. Director: Hannu Salonen.
- The Einstein of Sex (Der Einstein des Sex), 1999 – follows the life of Jewish doctor Magnus Hirschfeld who was a sexologist, a gay socialist and who established the first Institut für Sexualwissenschaft in Berlin in 1919. Directed by Rosa von Praunheim.
- Heroes Like Us (Helden wie wir), 1999 – showing life in East Berlin between 1968 and 1989. A young Stasi officer falls in love with a former school friend who is now critical of the regime. Directed by Sebastian Peterson.
- Lola and Billy the Kid, 1999 – a 17-year-old Turkish boy in Berlin discovers that he is homosexual, which provokes severe problems with his traditional family. Directed by Kutluğ Ataman.
- Nightshapes (Nachtgestalten), 1999 – about socially deprived people in Berlin. Directed by Andreas Dresen.
- Paths in the Night (Wege in die Nacht), 1999 – after German reunification, a former factory manager in East Berlin gets jobless. While his wife works in a bar, he becomes mentor to two young vigilantes who punish troublemakers in Berlin U-Bahn at night. Directed by Andreas Kleinert.
- Snow on New Year's Eve (Schnee in der Neujahrsnacht), 1999 – episodes from the 1999 Silvester night in Berlin, where a radio announcer calls people to bring their New Year's resolutions to fruition during the last hours of the old year. Directed by Thorsten Schmidt.
- Sonnenallee, 1999 – a teen comedy set in the East Berlin of the 1970s by Leander Haußmann.
- Der Tunnel, 1999 – documentary on four students in West Berlin digging a tunnel under Berlin Wall towards East Berlin in 1962 to rescue 29 people. Directed by Marcus Vetter.

== 2000s ==
=== 2000 ===
- alaska.de, 2000 – after a teenage girl moved to a miserable Plattenbau settlement in Hohenschönhausen district, she witnesses accidentally a murder. But afterwards she falls in love with one of the delinquents. Directed by Esther Gronenborn.
- Bonhoeffer: Agent of Grace (Bonhoeffer – Die letzte Stufe), 2000 – though theologian, writer and Lutheran pastor Dietrich Bonhoeffer could stay in the United States, he returns to Berlin in 1939 and becomes a member of the Resistance in the Abwehr. In 1943 he gets arrested by the Gestapo and in 1945 murdered at Flossenbürg concentration camp. Directed by Eric Till.
- Cold Is the Breath of Evening (Kalt ist der Abendhauch), 2000 – an 83-year-old woman in Zehlendorf looks back on her young days when she had a secret love affair with her brother-in-law and conceived a child from him. Based on a novel from Ingrid Noll and directed by Rainer Kaufmann.
- England!, 2000 – a soldier was exposed to radiation from the Chernobyl disaster and contracted a disease. On a last journey to England he becomes stranded in Berlin, searching for his former companion. Directed by Achim von Borries.
- Heimspiel, 2000 – documentary on the famous professional ice hockey team Eisbären Berlin at Wellblechpalast, its devoted supporters and the new role of the former club from the East in reunited Germany. Directed by Pepe Danquart.
- No Place to Go (Die Unberührbare), 2000 – after the Peaceful Revolution a communist female writer moves from Munich to Berlin and tries to start a new life. But she has to realise that her view of the former GDR was too euphemistic. Based on the life of Gisela Elsner and directed by her son Oskar Roehler.
- Return to Go! (Zurück auf Los!), 2000 – a group of homosexual men in Prenzlauer Berg district has to get along with love, AIDS, disability, unemployment and alcoholism. Directed by Pierre Sanoussi-Bliss.
- A Tale of two Cities (Der Flaneur von Berlin – Eine Erzählung von zwei Städten), 2000 – portrait on famous photographer Henry Ries who took pictures of the Berlin Air Lift. In 1999 he returned to Berlin and searched for his own past. Directed by Manfred Wilhelms.
- Three Chinamen with a Double Bass (Drei Chinesen mit dem Kontrabass), 2000 – after a druggy party night a young architect finds his fiancé dead in his flat. Together with two friends he has to get rid of the corpse – in busy Berlin-Mitte. Directed by Klaus Krämer.
- Trust Me (Freunde), 2000 – two former childhood friends meet again under different circumstances in Berlin: One of them became a gangster and the other is a policeman who has to convict his old friend. Directed by Martin Eigler.

=== 2001 ===
- Be.Angeled, 2001 – two days in the life of several young visitors of Berlin's Love Parade. The movie uses scenes from the 2000 electronic dance music festival and parade around Victory Column and Straße des 17. Juni. Directed by Roman Kuhn.
- Berlin Babylon, 2001 – documentary film on the reconstruction projects after the fall of the Wall, directed by Hubertus Siegert.
- Berlin Is in Germany, 2001 – drama about an East German political prisoner released from jail in post-unification Germany and now must come to terms with the geographic, political, and cultural displacements of Berlin in the 1990s. A film by Hannes Stöhr.
- Conspiracy, 2001 – film directed by Frank Pierson, made for HBO (television) USA, about the Wannsee Conference plan to exterminate the Jews during WWII.
- The Days Between (In den Tag hinein), 2001 – a 22-year-old waitress lives with her brother and his family, and with her spontaneous character she is the direct opposite to her disciplined boyfriend. When she meets a Japanese student, she drifts with him through Berlin. Directed by Maria Speth.
- Emil and the Detectives (Emil und die Detektive), 2001 – adventure film directed by Franziska Buch, based on the novel Emil and the Detectives by Erich Kästner.
- Female 2 Seeks Happy End (Frau2 sucht HappyEnd), 2001 – a doleful radio personality and one of his female listeners meet in a chat room and discuss their former, painful relationships. In autumnal Berlin they learn to relinquish and to establish new ties. Directed by Edward Berger.
- A Fine Day (Der schöne Tag), 2001 – about a girl in Berlin who wants to become an actress and makes her living by dubbing movies. By Thomas Arslan.
- Heidi M., 2001 – a divorced and lonely woman leads a corner shop in Berlin-Mitte where customers can talk about their problems. Directed by Michael Klier.
- Invincible (Unbesiegbar), 2001 – true story of a Jewish strongman in 1932 Berlin by Werner Herzog.
- Julietta (Julietta – Es ist nicht wie du denkst), 2001 – an 18-year-old high-school graduate from Stuttgart gets unconscious at Love Parade Berlin. A DJ pulls her out of a fountain and rapes her. When she gets pregnant, she does not know what her saviour did to her. Directed by Christoph Stark.
- Moonlight Tariff (Mondscheintarif), 2001 – an emancipated woman in her twenties living in Berlin is waiting wishfully for a one-night stand lover to call her again and experiences a rising depression. Directed by Ralf Huettner.
- My Sweet Home, 2001 – an American has persuaded his German girlfriend to marry him, after just one month of knowing each other. Now they celebrate their Polterabend with various immigrants in a Berlin bar. Directed by Filippos Tsitos.
- Never Mind the Wall (Wie Feuer und Flamme), 2001 – in 1982 a 17-year-old girl from West Berlin travels to East Berlin to her grandmother's funeral and falls in love with the leader of a punk clique, which evokes severe problems. Director: Connie Walther.
- Passing Summer (Mein langsames Leben), 2001 – the movie follows the slow-going life of a young woman in Berlin during summer. Directed by Angela Schanelec.
- Planet Alex, 2001 – episodic movie filmed at Alexanderplatz where the stories of several characters intertwine within a period of 24 hours. Directed by Uli M Schueppel.
- Sass, 2001 – based on the true story of brothers Franz and Erich Sass from Moabit district, who became the most famous and innovative bank robbers during 1920s Berlin. Directed by Carlo Rola.
- Taking Sides (Der Fall Furtwängler), 2001 – conductor Wilhelm Furtwängler stays in Nazi Germany rather than flee, and experiences consequences after the war. Film by István Szabó.
- The Tunnel (Der Tunnel), 2001 – dramatization of a collaborative tunnel under the wall in the 1950s. Film by Roland Suso Richter.
- What to Do in Case of Fire? (Was tun, wenn's brennt?), 2001 – police hunt down radicals whose bomb goes off 12 years late. Film by Gregor Schnitzler.
- Der Zimmerspringbrunnen, 2001 – after years of unemployment and uselessness a man in East Berlin creates a very successful Ostalgie item – a tabletop fountain consisting of a Fernsehturm Berlin model on a plate in the form of the GDR map. Directed by Peter Timm.

=== 2002 ===
- Berlin Symphony (Berlin: Sinfonie einer Großstadt), 2002 – the remake of Ruttmanns classic by Thomas Schadt shows one day in Berlin some years after the German reunification.
- Big Girls Don't Cry (Große Mädchen weinen nicht), 2002 – two girls in Berlin have been best friends since childhood. But as they step into adulthood, their perfect friendship gets harshly tested by several unfortunate events. Directed by Maria von Heland.
- Confessions of a Dangerous Mind, 2002 – depicting the life of game show producer Chuck Barris, who claimed to have also been working for the CIA. After a mission in Berlin to assassinate a communist, Barris is held captive by the KGB and gets swapped with a Soviet agent. Directed by George Clooney.
- Führer Ex, 2002 – two friends want to escape from East Germany, are caught and kept enclosed in a Berlin prison where one of them becomes a Neo-Nazi. Directed by Winfried Bonengel.
- Der Glanz von Berlin, 2002 – documentary about three cleaning ladies in Berlin and their personal dreams. Directed by Judith Keil and Antje Kruska.
- Half the Rent (Halbe Miete), 2002 – a computer hacker in Berlin steals information from foreign computers. When his paranoid girlfriend dies in the bathtub, he escapes to Cologne where he invades private flats to eat and to take a shower. Directed by Marc Ottiker.
- Hotte in Paradise (Hotte im Paradies), 2002 – a young panderer in Berlin has already two prostitutes working for him, but they don't earn enough money to fund his expensive way of life. So he acquires a new prosperous girl, but she gets kidnapped by a Russian competitor. Directed by Dominik Graf.
- Naked (Nackt), 2002 – three couples in Berlin meet for dinner and start an erotic identification game. Directed by Doris Dörrie.
- Ripley's Game, 2002 – an art framer from the Veneto who is dying of leukemia travels several times to Berlin to get medical examinations, and there he also assassinates mobsters on behalf of others. This attracts the mobsters' associates to his own family. Based on Ripley's Game by Patricia Highsmith and directed by Liliana Cavani.
- Starbuck Holger Meins, 2002 – documentary on Holger Meins who started to study cinematography at Deutsche Film- und Fernsehakademie Berlin and became a terrorist in the Red Army Faction. Directed by Gerd Conradt.
- Tattoo, 2002 – two police detectives in Berlin hunt a ritualistic serial killer murdering people with tattoos and skinning them for a mysterious collector. Directed by Robert Schwentke.
- Unternehmen Paradies, 2002 – atmospheric documentary movie about the cityscape, residents, visitors and the political and cultural life of Berlin by Volker Sattel.

=== 2003 ===
- Alltag, 2003 – depicting life in the Turkish neighborhood of Kreuzberg. Directed by Neco Celik.
- Anatomy 2, 2003 – a medical horror story, directed by Stefan Ruzowitzky.
- Angst (Der alte Affe Angst), 2003 – the different attitudes toward life lead a sensitive stage director and his beautiful girlfriend in Berlin to constant fights and conflicts. Directed by Oskar Roehler.
- Berlin – Eine Stadt sucht den Mörder, 2003 – a female photo-journalist is after a ripper in Berlin who could be a taxi driver. Directed by Urs Egger.
- Berlin Blues (Herr Lehmann), 2003 – a portrait of typical people in Berlin-Kreuzberg during the 1980s. Director: Leander Haußmann.
- Distant Lights (Lichter), 2003 – reflects on the situation at the border between Poland and Germany around Frankfurt (Oder) and Słubice. One man from a group of Ukrainians can manage to cross the border illegally and reaches finally Potsdamer Platz in Berlin. Directed by Hans-Christian Schmid.
- Good Bye, Lenin!, 2003 – award-winning bittersweet comedy about the reunification, by Wolfgang Becker.
- Kroko, 2003 – a violent girl in Berlin-Wedding is sentenced to several days of community work at a flat-sharing community with handicapped persons. Director: Sylke Enders.
- Learning to Lie (Liegen lernen), 2003 – based on the novel of Frank Goosen and telling the love stories of a young man driving several times to Berlin, beginning with a school trip. Director: Hendrik Handloegten.
- Red and Blue (Rot und Blau), 2003 – a respected architect – a great mother and wife – has a good life in Berlin when her daughter from a relationship with a Turkish immigrant some 25 years ago appears. Directed by Rudolf Thome.
- Rosenstrasse, 2003 – flashback retelling of the events of the 1943 Rosenstrasse protest, by Margarethe von Trotta.
- Soloalbum, 2003 – about a young music editorial journalist in Berlin. Directed by Gregor Schnitzler.
- We (Wir), 2003 – a group of school friends meet real life in Berlin after final secondary-school examinations and before the beginning of studies. Directed by Martin Gypkens.

=== 2004 ===
- A2Z, filmed 2004 – an old man and his Lolita are committed to kill each other that very day, directed by Daryush Shokof.
- Alles auf Zucker! (Go for Zucker), 2004 – comedy with Ossi-Wessi and secular-orthodox Jewish themes. Director Dani Levy.
- Berliner Maifestspiele, 2004 – Director: Nives Konik.
- The Bourne Supremacy, 2004 – American spy mystery thriller with many scenes filmed / set in Berlin. Directed by Paul Greengrass.
- Chasing Liberty, 2004 – on an official trip to Prague, the daughter of the President of the United States meets a handsome young man and escapes with him to Venice and to Love Parade in Berlin. Shortly after she fell in love with him she has to realize that he is just another Special Agent. Directed by Andy Cadiff.
- Downfall (Der Untergang), 2004 – film depicting the last days of Hitler and the Battle of Berlin, set in and around the "Führerbunker", directed by Oliver Hirschbiegel.
- The Edukators (Die fetten Jahre sind vorbei), 2004 – film depicting the encounter of three anti-capitalist activists and a wealthy businessman in Berlin-Zehlendorf. Directed by Hans Weingartner.
- EuroTrip, 2004 – an American teenager travels across Europe with his friends in search of his German pen pal. When he cannot find her in her home town Berlin, he follows her to Rome. Directed by Jeff Schaffer.
- Herzlutschen, 2004 – in Friedrichshain district a young lightheaded man searches for a new abode, but meets a depressive hippie girl who constantly faints. At the same time a young journalist searches for a submerged Nobel Prize winner. Directed by Joost Renders.
- Jargo, 2004 – a coming of age film about a young male who experiences culture shock from moving from Saudi Arabia to Berlin. Directed by Maria Solrun.
- Love in Thoughts (Was nützt die Liebe in Gedanken), 2004 – about the so-called Steglitz student tragedy in 1927, when two young men made a suicide pact under the influence of alcohol, music and sex, leading to a tragedy. Directed by Achim von Borries.
- Meine schönsten Jahre, 2004 – eight-part Ostalgie movie about a man looking back to the year 1983 when he was 13 years old and lived in a Plattenbau settlement in East Berlin. Directed by Edzard Onneken and Ulli Baumann.
- Muxmäuschenstill, 2004 – follows a vigilante who lives in Berlin and used to study philosophy. The do-gooder wants to bring justice to criminals in his own way, but becomes a wrongdoer himself. Director: Marcus Mittermeier.
- Olga, 2004 – German Jewish communist militant Olga Benário comes to Berlin in 1925 where she helps organize Otto Braun's escape from Moabit prison. After years in Moscow she is sent to Brazil with Luís Carlos Prestes, but the insurrection fails. Benário is extradited to Nazi Germany and murdered at Bernburg Euthanasia Centre. Directed by Jayme Monjardim.
- Olga Benario – Ein Leben für die Revolution, 2004 – docudrama on the life of Olga Benário, from her early years in Munich over the rescue of Otto Braun from Moabit prison, her relationship to revolutionary Luís Carlos Prestes, the birth of her daughter Anita Leocádia at Berlin Barnimstrasse women's prison until her death at Bernburg Euthanasia Centre. Directed by Galip Iyitanir.
- Rhythm Is It!, 2004 – documents a project by the Berlin Philharmonic principal conductor Simon Rattle and choreographer Royston Maldoom to popularize classical music by staging a performance of Igor Stravinsky's ballet The Rite of Spring with 250 children from Berlin's public schools. Directed by Thomas Grube and Enrique Sánchez Lansch.
- Room Service (Das Zimmermädchen und der Millionär), 2004 – a millionaire owns the luxurious Berlin Hotel Ritz for a short period of time. But when he arrives he is considered to be a temporary waiter, instructed for service and falls in love with a waitress. Directed by Andreas Senn.
- Die Spielwütigen, 2004 – documentary on four young actors studying at Berlin Ernst Busch Academy of Dramatic Arts and taking first steps into professional acting. Directed by Andres Veiel.
- Status Yo!, 2004 – the Berlin HipHop scene, rappers have 24 hours to stage a megaconcert, by Till Hastreiter.
- Stauffenberg, 2004 – about Claus Schenk Graf von Stauffenberg and the 20 July 1944 plot to assassinate Adolf Hitler. Directed by Jo Baier.
- Die Stunde der Offiziere, 2004 – a semi-documentary movie telling in chronological order about the German resistance attempts to kill Adolf Hitler and seize power in Germany in the July 20 plot of 1944. Directed by Hans-Erich Viet.
- Der Teufel von Rudow, 2004 – horror film about a couple in Rudow district investigating mysterious incidents dealing with a man caged in their neighbour's house. Director: Ulrich Meczulat.
- Venussian Tabutasco, 2004 – life of people in a building is seen through a "glass elevator" going up and down the floors of the building, Directed by Daryush Shokof.
- Walk on Water, 2004 – an Israeli hitman working for Mossad has to find an aging Nazi war criminal in Berlin but has in the meantime formed a profound friendship with two young German grandchildren of the senile man. Directed by Eytan Fox.
- Woman Driving, Man Sleeping (Frau fährt, Mann schläft), 2004 – an outwardly perfect and prosperous family in Berlin moves to Potsdamer Platz, but gets confused when the eldest son dies suddenly from an aneurysm. Directed by Rudolf Thome.

=== 2005 ===
- About the Looking for and the Finding of Love (Vom Suchen und Finden der Liebe), 2005 – a composer and a female singer meet in Berlin and think they found the love of their life. When they separate after several years, the composer commits suicide and the singer follows him to release him from the underworld. Based on the Orpheus story and directed by Helmut Dietl.
- The Airlift (Die Luftbrücke – Nur der Himmel war frei), 2005 – historic drama about a difficult love affair between a German secretary working at the Berlin Tempelhof Airport and an American general during the Berlin Airlift 1948–1949. Directed by Dror Zahavi.
- Antibodies (Antikörper), 2005 – a police officer from a small village wants to solve the murder of a 12-year-old girl, travels to Berlin to talk to a pederast serial killer and slowly begins to explore his own dark side. Directed by Christian Alvart.
- Berlin Stories (Stadt als Beute), 2005 – episode film about the lives of three actors rehearsing a play at a Berlin backyard theatre. Directed by Miriam Dehne, Esther Gronenborn and Irene von Alberti.
- Flightplan, 2005 – the husband of a female U.S. aircraft engineer dies under mysterious circumstances while the family lives in Berlin. When the mother flies back to New York City with his coffin, her six-year-old daughter suddenly vanishes on the plane. Directed by Robert Schwentke.
- Ghosts (Gespenster), 2005 – a female end-of-teenage orphan with mental problems starts a new job as a garden cleaner in Berlin and meets two mysterious women. Directed by Christian Petzold.
- Ich bin ein Berliner, 2005 – a professional cheater in Berlin creates the story that he is an illegitimate son of John F. Kennedy from the 1963 visit to West Berlin. When a journalist starts to investigate the story, it turns out to be true. Directed by Franziska Meyer Price.
- KlassenLeben, 2005 – documentary on a project in Schöneberg district to integrate four disabled children into a regular school form. Directed by Hubertus Siegert.
- Die letzte Schlacht, 2005 – docudrama about the Battle of Berlin from April to May 1945, based on genuine stories of contemporary witnesses. Directed by Hans-Christoph Blumenberg.
- Lord of War, 2005 – a Ukrainian-American gunrunner comes to a Berlin Arms Fair in 1983 to meet a famous international arms dealer. During the late 1980s and after the dissolution of the Soviet Union he becomes one of the worldwide most successful market actors. Directed by Andrew Niccol.
- Netto, 2005 – a middle-aged loser in Prenzlauer Berg tries to accept the challenge of life when his 15-year-old son moves in and helps him with job applications and interviews. Directed by Robert Thalheim.
- No Songs of Love (Keine Lieder über Liebe), 2005 – a young film director from Berlin attends a concert tour to make a documentary movie on his brother singing in a rock band. During the tour the director wants to find out if his own girlfriend had an affair with his brother in the past. Directed by Lars Kraume.
- Speer und Er, 2005 – three-part docudrama about Adolf Hitler and his General Building Inspector for the Reich Capital, Albert Speer, their plans to convert Berlin into Welthauptstadt Germania and Speers imprisonment at Spandau Prison after the Nuremberg Trials. Directed by Heinrich Breloer.
- Spiele der Macht – 11011 Berlin, 2005 – a female political scientist becomes counsellor of the Chancellor of Germany who transfers some of his power to her. Directed by Markus Imboden.
- Summer in Berlin (Sommer vorm Balkon), 2005 – two women struggle with life, and a man. Director Andreas Dresen.
- Wir waren niemals hier, 2005 – documentary on Berlin rock band Mutter. Directed by Antonia Ganz.

=== 2006 ===
- 18.15 Uhr ab Ostkreuz, 2006 – trashy parody on Miss Marple about a retired teacher from Haselhorst district witnessing a horrible murder on a passing Berlin S-Bahn train. Directed by Jörn Hartmann.
- Altlastpalast, 2006 – the story of the Palace of the Republic and its deconstruction in 2006 to make room for the reconstruction of the Berlin Stadtschloss. Directed by Irina Enders.
- Atomised (Elementarteilchen), 2006 – a molecular biologist in Berlin quits his job to go back into scientific research. His half brother voluntarily checks himself into a mental institution after having sexually harassed one of his students. Directed by Oskar Roehler.
- Black Sheep (Schwarze Schafe), 2006 – tells in five episodes the stories of people in Berlin with financial problems. Director: Oliver Rihs.
- Cold Summer (Die Mauer – Berlin '61), 2006 – telling the story of a family in Berlin who was divided during the day when the Berlin Wall was built in 1961. Directed by Hartmut Schoen.
- F4: Vortex (Tornado – Der Zorn des Himmels), 2006 – two-part fictional drama on a young meteorologist returning from the US to Berlin, who predicts a tornado sweeping over the capital city. Directed by Andreas Linke.
- Feiern, 2006 – documentary on people in Berlin who dedicate their lives to electronic dance music, nightclubs, parties and drugs. Directed by Maja Classen.
- The Good German, 2006 – homage to film noir, set in 1945 Berlin during the Potsdam Conference, by Steven Soderbergh.
- Happy as One (Komm näher), 2006 – the relationship problems of several lonely persons in Berlin and the efforts to find a new love attachment. Director: Vanessa Jopp.
- The Lives of Others (Das Leben der Anderen), 2006 – East Berlin's cultural scene before reunification, riddled by Stasi secret agents. Drama by Florian Henckel von Donnersmarck.
- Lucy, 2006 – about an 18-year-old girl in Berlin who has a baby and still lives with her own mother. Directed by Henner Winckler.
- Nicht böse sein!, 2006 – documentary on three addicted men who share a flat in Kreuzberg district. Directed by Wolfgang Reinke.
- P05 – Protection 05: Jugend in Kreuzberg, 2006 – Directors: Nives Konik, Marc Konik.
- Rage (Wut), 2006 – the rise of a conflict between a liberal German middle-class family in Tempelhof district and a Turkish gang leader results in brutal vigilantism. Directed by Züli Aladag.
- The Red Cockatoo (Der Rote Kakadu), 2006 – young love and friendship in 1961 East Germany; partly set in the Kopenhagener Straße. Director Dominik Graf.
- Riding Up Front (Schöner Leben), 2006 – at Christmas Eve several residents and visitors in Berlin try very hard to get happy. Directed by Markus Herling.
- Tough Enough (Knallhart), 2006 – a film about the run-down district of Berlin-Neukölln. Directed by Detlev Buck.
- Valerie, 2006 – a former model who is now totally broke has to survive in her car in Christmassy Berlin. Directed by Birgit Möller.
- Where Is Fred? (Wo ist Fred?), 2006 – in order to catch a basketball from Alba Berlin, the favorite team of his girlfriend's son, a foreman poses as a disabled fan using a wheelchair. When he catches the ball, he also catches the attention of a young female filmmaker. Directed by Anno Saul.
- You Told Me, You Love Me (Du hast gesagt, dass Du mich liebst), 2006 – a retired woman in Berlin who has been a professional swimmer during her young days meets a younger writer after she responded to his lonely hearts ad. Directed by Rudolf Thome.

=== 2007 ===
- Berlin Round Dance (Berliner Reigen), 2007 – a fictional view on society in Berlin in 10 episodes in the style of a round dance. Based on the play La Ronde by Arthur Schnitzler and directed by Dieter Berner.
- BerlinSong, 2007 – documentary on six young musicians from around the world who have settled in Berlin and written songs about their favourite places in the city. Directed by Uli M Schueppel.
- Drifter, 2007 – documentary showing the life of homeless children in Berlin mired in drug addiction and child prostitution. Directed by Sebastian Heidinger.
- Du bist nicht allein, 2007 – a portrait of people living in a tower block with council flats in East Berlin. Directed by Bernd Böhlich.
- Die Frau vom Checkpoint Charlie, 2007 – in 1982, an East German woman tries to flee with her two daughters to the West but they get caught. Although the mother gets redeemed from prison by the West German government, the children are sent to adoptive parents. She subsequently demonstrates at length at Checkpoint Charlie to get back her daughters. Based on the true story of Jutta Fleck and directed by Miguel Alexandre.
- KDD – Kriminaldauerdienst, 2007 – Directors: Matthias Glasner, Lars Kraume, Filippos Tsitos, Edward Berger, Andreas Prochaska and Züli Aladag.
- Knut - Aus der Kinderstube eines Eisbären / Knut - Ein Eisbär entdeckt die Welt, 2007 – two-part documentary about cute little polar bear Knut who gets raised by his zookeeper Thomas Dörflein at Berlin Zoological Garden and subsequently becomes a beloved celebrity. Directed by Georg Berger, Daniel Remsperger and Andrea Stieringer.
- Leroy, 2007 – a black afro guy in Berlin falls in love with a girl who has five Neo-Nazi brothers. Directed by Armin Völckers.
- Der Letzte macht das Licht aus!, 2007 – three unemployed men try to survive in Berlin and prepare for emigration to Norway. Directed by Clemens Schönborn.
- Max Minsky and Me (Max Minsky und ich), 2007 – a nerdy Jewish girl in Berlin gets straight A's, except for gym. To meet her dream prince, she has to take basketball lessons to join her school's girls team. Directed by Anna Justice.
- My Führer – The Really Truest Truth about Adolf Hitler (Mein Führer – Die wirklich wahrste Wahrheit über Adolf Hitler), 2007 – comedy about Adolf Hitler and his preparation together with his Jewish acting coach for a big New Year's speech. Directed by Dani Levy.
- Pool of Princesses (Prinzessinnenbad), 2007 – documentary about three teenagers in Berlin's Kreuzberg district, by Bettina Blümner.
- Rabbit Without Ears (Keinohrhasen), 2007 – a yellow press reporter in Berlin is sentenced to 300 hours of community service at a daycare center where he falls in love with the female center's manager. Director: Til Schweiger.
- Raging Inferno (Das Inferno – Flammen über Berlin), 2007 – a fire breaks out in the Fernsehturm Berlin and a chaos erupts among the trapped. A disgraced former firefighter helps to rescue the visitors. Directed by Rainer Matsutani.
- Reclaim Your Brain (Free Rainer – Dein Fernseher lügt), 2007 – driven by viewing rates, the producer of soap operas, talk shows and reality television at a commercial broadcasting company in Berlin realizes the absurdity of his job. So he quits and establishes a system to manipulate the audience measurement, causing a cultural revolution. Directed by Hans Weingartner.
- The Reichsorchester (Das Reichsorchester), 2007 – documentary about the role of Berlin Philharmonic orchestra during the Third Reich, by Enrique Sánchez Lansch.
- Shootback Heimat Kreuzberg, 2007 – Directors: Nives Konik, Marc Konik.
- wegen Nelly, 2007 – Director: Jonathan Bölling.
- Wrong Number, 2007 – a New Yorker in Berlin dials a wrong number, the girl on the other end is curiously receptive and their subsequent conversations become seemingly spontaneous and personal. Directed by Lewis Häusler.

=== 2008 ===
- 1st of May: All Belongs to You (1. Mai – Helden bei der Arbeit), 2008 – episodic movie on several people who meet during the International Workers' Day and the traditional riots in Kreuzberg district. Directed by Jan-Christoph Glaser, Carsten Ludwig, Sven Taddicken and Jakob Ziemnicki.
- The Baader Meinhof Complex (Der Baader Meinhof Komplex), 2008 – retells the story of the early years of the West German far-left terror group RAF showing the murder of Benno Ohnesorg in West-Berlin during the visit of Shah Mohammad Reza Pahlavi and the bombing of the Axel Springer AG until the set of events called German Autumn. Directed by Uli Edel.
- Berlin by the Sea (Berlin am Meer), 2008 – telling the story of students in Berlin working as Disc jockeys and sharing a flat. Directed by Wolfgang Eissler.
- Berlin Calling, 2008 – Berlin's electronic music scene, a tragicomedy in the Berlin of today. Written and directed by Hannes Stöhr.
- Cherry Blossoms (Kirschblüten – Hanami), 2008 – a long-married Bavarian couple travels to Berlin to see the children, and afterwards to the Baltic Sea where the mother dies. The father tries to make up for the loss of his wife and travels to Japan to see the Butoh dance. Directed by Doris Dörrie.
- Cloud 9 (Wolke Neun), 2008 – a woman in the middle of her 60s living in Berlin has been married for 30 years when she starts a secret love affair with a man aged 76. Directed by Andreas Dresen.
- Evet, I Do! (Evet, ich will!), 2008 – several multicultural couples in a Berlin tower block want to get married but experience severe problems. Directed by Sinan Akkuş.
- Heroes from the Neighbourhood (Helden aus der Nachbarschaft), 2008 – the female host of an unsuccessful TV show in Berlin is searching for new participants. Directed by Jovan Arsenic.
- Love, Peace & Beatbox, 2008 – documentary on the rising beatboxing subculture in Berlin. Directed by Volker Meyer-Dabisch.
- Melodies of Spring (Märzmelodie), 2008 – about the relationship problems of several couples in Berlin. Directed by Martin Walz.
- The Miracle of Berlin (Das Wunder von Berlin), 2008 – about a family in East Berlin who experiences the opening of the Berlin Wall in 1989. Directed by Roland Suso Richter.
- SubBerlin – Underground United, 2008 – documentary on the famous Berlin underground techno club and record label Tresor which became famous after 1991 in the vaults of a former department store. Directed by Tilmann Künzel.
- This Is Berlin Not New York, 2008 – artists from New York and Berlin create original artworks, director Ethan Minsker.
- Valkyrie, 2008 – historical thriller by Bryan Singer based on the July 20, 1944 plot by German army officers to assassinate Adolf Hitler with the conspirators operating out of Berlin.
- Waiting for Angelina (Warten auf Angelina), 2008 – a paparazzo and an obsessive fan become pals while staking out Brangelina's apartment in Berlin. Directed by Hans-Christoph Blumenberg.
- A Woman in Berlin (Anonyma – Eine Frau in Berlin), 2008 – film of the diary A Woman in Berlin by Marta Hillers depicting the rape of many Berlin women by the Soviets in 1945, by Max Färberböck.

=== 2009 ===
- 24 Hours Berlin (24 h Berlin – Ein Tag im Leben), 2009 – the 24 hours documentary shows the personal life of 50 different people in Berlin. Directed by Volker Heise.
- 24 Stunden Schlesisches Tor, 2009 – a film team talking to people passing by at Schlesisches Tor station in Kreuzberg district for 24 hours. Directed by Anna de Paoli and Eva Lia Reinegger.
- Auf der anderen Seite der Leinwand – 100 Jahre Moviemento, 2009 – documentary on the famous Moviemento repertory cinema in Kreuzberg district, which was founded in 1907 and developed a huge impact on the cultural environment and the work of young filmmakers. Directed by Bernd Sobolla.
- Beloved Berlin Wall (Liebe Mauer), 2009 – a female student in West Berlin falls in love with a soldier from the NVA border troops in East Berlin during the year 1989. Directed by Peter Timm.
- Berlin 36, 2009 – telling the fate of Jewish track and field athlete Gretel Bergmann in the 1936 Summer Olympics. Directed by Kaspar Heidelbach.
- Berlin – Lost In Time And Space, 2009 – documentary on the music scene in West Berlin between 1970 and 1989 with F.M. Einheit, Kid Congo Powers, David Bowie, Die Haut, Ideal, Nina Hagen, Einstürzende Neubauten, Ton Steine Scherben and others. Directed by Oliver Schwabe.
- Beyond the Wall (Jenseits der Mauer), 2009 – in 1974 a couple from East Germany tries to flee, and they are allowed to leave in case they give their daughter up for adoption and spy for Stasi in West Germany. In November 1989 they meet again when Berlin Wall falls at Bornholmer Straße border crossing. Directed by Friedemann Fromm.
- Catapult (Achterbahn), 2009 – documentary movie about carny Norbert Witte and his family, his futile attempts to run and develop the Berlin Spreepark amusement park and his fall after smuggling cocaine from Peru to Germany. Directed by Peter Dörfler.
- The City Named Desire (Sehnsucht Berlin), 2009 – documentary of the city as seen by famous artists, temporary Berliners. Written and directed by Peter Zach.
- Comrade Couture (Ein Traum in Erdbeerfolie), 2009 – the protagonists of the official and underground fashion scene in East Berlin during the 1980s look back on their bohemian and unadapted way of life. Directed by Marco Wilms.
- Dutschke, 2009 – docudrama on the life of Rudi Dutschke, the most prominent spokesperson of the German student movement of the 1960s, and on his work in West Berlin. Directed by Stefan Krohmer.
- Flucht in die Freiheit – Mit dem Mut der Verzweiflung / Flucht in die Freiheit – Mit allen Mitteln, 2009 – two-part documentary on spectacular attempts to escape over Berlin Wall between 1961 and 1989. Directed by Jörg Müllner and Oliver Halmburger.
- Gangs, 2009 – a boy from a street gang in Neukölln falls in love with a wealthy and ballet dancing girl. But he has to help his older brother to repay the debt to a drug dealer. Directed by Rainer Matsutani.
- Hans im Glück, 2009 – portrait of Berlin bass player Hans Narva, his music, his family and a life spent fighting the rules – whoever defines them. Directed by Claudia Lehmann.
- Hilde, 2009 – biographical film depicting the life of famous German actress and singer Hildegard Knef. In 1966 Hildegard Knef prepares for a concert in Berlin and thinks back to the beginnings of her career at UFA. Directed by Kai Wessel.
- I've Never Been Happier (So glücklich war ich noch nie), 2009 – an incurable impostor gets released from prison and tries to live a normal life in Berlin but lapses back into crime and falls in love with a beautiful but shy prostitute. Directed by Alexander Adolph.
- Im Kopfstand zum Glück, 2009 – the documentary accompanies four city dwellers in Berlin who meet at a modern yoga studio during their training to become yoga teachers. Directed by Irene Gräf.
- In Berlin, 2009 – the documentary follows the life and work of several persons engaged in the Berlin cultural sector and politics. Directed by Michael Ballhaus and Ciro Cappellari.
- The International, 2009 – a finance thriller directed by Tom Tykwer.
- The Invisible Frame, 2009 – 21 years after Cycling the Frame Tilda Swinton again follows the course of former Berlin Wall on a bicycle to discover what has changed in the meantime. Directed by Cynthia Beatt.
- Losing Balance (Draußen am See), 2009 – a 14-year-old girl in Berlin has to face the breakup of her by then happy family. Shortly before the dark abyss she decides to take her future into her own hands and takes a very courageous step. Directed by Felix Fuchssteiner.
- Männersache, 2009 – a man working at the Berlin Zoo wants to start a career as a comedian. Directed by Gernot Roll and Mario Barth.
- Men in the City (Männerherzen), 2009 – about the personal problems of several men in Berlin who exercise at a fitness centre. Directed by Simon Verhoeven.
- Ninja Assassin, 2009 – a disillusioned Japanese assassin is looking for retribution against his former mentor. In Berlin he meets a female Europol agent investigating political murders carried out by the same old Ninja clan where the assassin was trained as a child. Directed by James McTeigue.
- Off Ways (Elektrokohle (Von Wegen)), 2009 – in December 1989, industrial band Einstürzende Neubauten played its first concert in East Berlin at VEB Elektrokohle Lichtenberg. 20 years later the protagonists and fans look back on the locations and the cultural impact of the event. Directed by Uli M Schueppel.
- Pink, 2009 – a young woman poet in Berlin marries her three best friends successively, but only with her third husband she finds happiness and peace. Directed by Rudolf Thome.
- Rabbit à la Berlin, 2009 – the documentary movie tells the story of the Berlin Wall but from point of view of a group of wild rabbits which inhabited the zone between the two walls separating West Berlin from East Berlin during the Cold War. Directed by Bartosz Konopka.
- Rabbit Without Ears 2 (Zweiohrküken), 2009 – following Rabbit Without Ears, everyday routine has entered the relationship between the reporter and his girlfriend after two years. By Til Schweiger.
- Saturn Returns, 2009 – a privileged female North American expat in contemporary Berlin, living a life of post punk hedonism, roams the streets with her best friend. Together they use the city like a playground, a stage, and a never ending party. Director: Lior Shamriz.

== 2010s ==
=== 2010 ===
- Bedways, 2010 – a female filmmaker takes two young actors to a huge, run-down apartment in Berlin-Mitte to prepare a movie about love and sex. Directed by RP Kahl.
- Bella Vita, 2010 – a housewife is deceived by her husband publicly and has to find a new home and life with her daughter in Kreuzberg district. Directed by Thomas Berger.
- Berlin: Hasenheide, 2010 – documentary about a park in Berlin's Neukölln district, directed by Nana Rebhan.
- Blackout (380.000 Volt – Der große Stromausfall), 2010 – an electrical power outage in Berlin causes a riot and looting in the city. Directed by Sebastian Vigg.
- Boxhagener Platz, 2010 – about family life and problems in East Berlin in 1968 while at the same time in West Berlin the students are protesting. Director: Matti Geschonneck.
- Civil Courage (Zivilcourage), 2010 – a senior bookseller does not know much about his problematic Berlin quarter until he is involved in a brutal assault. Directed by Dror Zahavi.
- The Coming Days (Die kommenden Tage), 2010 – in the year 2020 the world is dominated by resource wars and a more and more encapsulated Western world. The daughter of a wealthy Berlin family tries to live a normal life, but her sister and a friend get involved in a civilization threatening terror group. Directed by Lars Kraume.
- The Debt, 2010 – in 1965 three Mossad agents find a Nazi war criminal in East Berlin and kidnap him for a trial in Israel. But the escape via Wollankstraße station fails, the former "Surgeon of Birkenau" can flee and the agents have to fudge their story. Based on the Israel movie The Debt and directed by John Madden.
- The Drifter (Eine flexible Frau), 2010 – a 40-year-old female architect in Berlin loses her job and has to get along with identity, job centre and the loss of her social status. Directed by Tatjana Turanskyj.
- Friendship!, 2010 – two young filmmakers from East Berlin are glad that the Wall came down. One of them searches for his own father and so they travel adventurously to San Francisco in 1989. Directed by Markus Goller.
- The Hairdresser (Die Friseuse), 2010 – a female hairdresser in Marzahn district struggles with her own overweight, the separation from her husband, the difficult foundation of a hairdresser's shop and a rising multiple sclerosis. Directed by Doris Dörrie.
- Im Angesicht des Verbrechens, 2010 – movie in 10 parts following the stories of characters in and around the Russian mafia in Berlin. Directed by Dominik Graf.
- In the Shadows (Im Schatten), 2010 – focuses on a burglar in Berlin who gets released from prison and wants to contact his old partner, but the former partner sets two killers on him. Directed by Thomas Arslan.
- Jew Suss: Rise and Fall (Jud Süß – Film ohne Gewissen), 2010 – in 1939 Nazi Propaganda minister Joseph Goebbels invites director Veit Harlan, actor Ferdinand Marian and others to Berlin Ordenspalais and drives them to produce the infamous propaganda film Jud Süß. Directed by Oskar Roehler.
- Life Is Too Long (Das Leben ist zu lang), 2010 – an unsuccessful Jewish filmmaker in Berlin gets the chance to film his own script. But then he realizes that his own life and story is just part of a film directed by Dani Levy.
- Neukölln Unlimited, 2010 – documentary about three siblings' daily lives in Berlin's Neukölln district, directed by Agostino Imondi and Dietmar Ratsch.
- Night Shifts (Nachtschichten), 2010 – documentary portrait of several people in Berlin who mainly work or come out during night, such as security guards, homeless people, DJs and graffiti sprayers. Directed by Ivette Löcker.
- Rammbock: Berlin Undead (Rammbock), 2010 – a horror movie about zombies attacking people in Berlin. Directed by Marvin Kren.
- Shahada, 2010 – the fates of three Muslims in Berlin collide during Ramadan as they struggle to find their place between faith and modern life in western society. Directed by Burhan Qurbani.
- Single by Contract (Groupies bleiben nicht zum Frühstück), 2010 – a 17-year-old girl in Berlin falls in love with the lead singer of a band named Berlin Mitte. But he has signed a contract to stay a single person to enhance band marketing. Directed by Marc Rothemund.
- Three (Drei), 2010 – centered on a 40-something couple in Berlin who, separately, fall in love with the same man. Directed by Tom Tykwer.
- We Are the Night (Wir sind die Nacht), 2010 – horror film about a group of female vampires in Berlin. Directed by Dennis Gansel.
- Weissensee, 2010–2015 – the story of two different families in East Berlin during the 1980s. One family is loyal to the socialistic system while the other family is quite critical. Directed by Friedemann Fromm.
- When We Leave (Die Fremde), 2010 – highlights the problem of honor killings by depicting the drama of a Turkish family living in Berlin. Directed by Feo Aladag.
- Zeiten ändern dich, 2010 – biographical film on the life and work of Anis Mohamed Youssef Ferchichi, who grew up in Tempelhof district and became famous rapper Bushido. Directed by Uli Edel.

=== 2011 ===
- Nine Lives (9 Leben), 2011 – several street children in Berlin talk about their daily life, referring not only to drug addiction and physical/traumatic injuries, but also to their talents and dreams. Directed by Maria Speth.
- The Big Eden, 2011 – documentary on the legendary playboy and bon viveur Rolf Eden who became the most famous owner of dance halls and nightclubs in West Berlin after 1957, his dazzling life and his numerous muses. Directed by Peter Dörfler.
- Blissestrasse, 2011 – the story of a group of young American Christians on a mission to Berlin to try to bring the Germans back to Jesus. Directed by Paul Donovan.
- Blutzbrüdaz, 2011 – two friends in Berlin start an underground rap duo and they get discovered by Sony Music Entertainment. But artistic compromises lead to an alienation between the friends. Featuring Sido and B-Tight, directed by Özgür Yildirim.
- Burnout (Abgebrannt), 2011 – a poor and overstrained Turkish single mother from Wedding district receives a cure on Fehmarn island with her three children. But her drug smuggling friend finds her up there as well. Directed by Verena S. Freytag.
- Christopher and His Kind, 2011 – tells the story of Christopher Isherwood's life in Berlin in the early 1930s. The film was adapted by Kevin Elyot from Isherwood's autobiography of the same title. Directed by Geoffrey Sax.
- Cracks in the Shell (Die Unsichtbare), 2011 – a shy female drama student suffers from not being seen but gets the leading part in a play at Berlin Volksbühne theater. The famous stage director turns out her injured being and she awakens to her femininity, but she also loses her own strengths. Directed by Christian Schwochow.
- Don 2, 2011 Bollywood film, – a sequel to 2006 hit Don: The Chase Begins Again. An action-thriller featuring Shah Rukh Khan and Priyanka Chopra. Story revolves around a robbery in Berlin's DZB. Directed by Farhan Akhtar.
- Dr. Ketel – Der Schatten von Neukölln, 2011 – in the near future a man works as an underground doctor and modern medical Robin Hood in Neukölln district until he is hunted by the security. Directed by Linus de Paoli.
- Farewell to the Frogs (Abschied von den Fröschen), 2011 – from 1996 to 1998 filmmaker Ulrich Schamoni documents in a video diary the two last years of his life in and around his house in Grunewald district, where he also filmed several of his movies, before he dies of leukaemia. Directed by Ulrike Schamoni.
- Hotel Desire, 2011 – erotic movie about a hotel maid in Berlin who did not have sex for several years when she unintentionally breaks into a blind painter's hotel room. Directed by Sergej Moya. Starring Saralisa Volm.
- Hut in the Woods (Die Summe meiner einzelnen Teile), 2011 – after a burnout, a maths genius from Berlin is released from mental hospital. But his job and girlfriend are away, so he starts to build a hut to live in the woods. Directed by Hans Weingartner.
- If Not Us, Who? (Wer wenn nicht wir), 2011 – during the early 1960s, Bernward Vesper and Gudrun Ensslin move from Tübingen to West Berlin to study and publish literature. During the German student movement he drops out while she becomes a terrorist in the Red Army Faction. Directed by Andres Veiel.
- In Heaven, Underground: The Weissensee Jewish Cemetery (Im Himmel, unter der Erde – Der jüdische Friedhof Weißensee), 2011 – documentary portrait about the Jewish Weißensee Cemetery in Weissensee district, the history of the Jews in Berlin and their culture. Directed by Britta Wauer.
- Kokowääh, 2011 – story of a man in Berlin who meets his eight-year-old daughter the first time and learns that she will live with him now. Directed by and starring Til Schweiger.
- Mauerjahre – Leben im geteilten Berlin, 2011 – documentary on the political, cultural and daily life in divided Berlin between 1961 and 1990. Directed by Reinhard Joksch.
- Men in the City 2 (Männerherzen … und die ganz ganz große Liebe), 2011 – following Men in the City and showing the same group of men in Berlin who have to fight for their beloved women. Directed by Simon Verhoeven.
- One Night in Berlin, 2011 – a female drug addict on the run has one night to find her estranged, homeless father on the streets of Berlin, and under cover of darkness the secrets of their East German past come to light. Starring Beate Malkus and Helmuth Meier-Lautenschläger. Directed by Kivmars Bowling.
- Pigeons on the Roof (Die Relativitätstheorie der Liebe), 2011 – several couples in Berlin (all played by the same two actors) try to find or keep love and respect. Directed by Otto Alexander Jahrreiss.
- Rent Boys (Die Jungs vom Bahnhof Zoo), 2011 – documentary on male child prostitutes around Berlin Zoologischer Garten. Directed by Rosa von Praunheim.
- Summer Window (Fenster zum Sommer), 2011 – a woman from Berlin travels to her family in Finland with her new friend. At one night she experiences a leap back in time and awakes in Berlin in the past with her old friend. She tries to modify the past, but this attempt is not in any case crowned with success. Based on the novel by Hannelore Valencak and directed by Hendrik Handloegten.
- Swans, 2011 – father and son travel to Berlin to visit the mother of the family who is in hospital in a coma. The son discovers the dark side of the city and develops a secret passion for his mother's flatmate. Directed by Hugo Vieira da Silva.
- The Tragic Life of Gloria S. (Das traurige Leben der Gloria S.), 2011 – a filmmaker wants to do a documentary on a jobless Hartz IV welfare recipient. The film team starts to document the life of an apparently poor woman, but after some weeks they realize that the protagonist is a professional actress. Directed by Christine Groß and Ute Schall.
- Unknown, 2011 – a drama thriller directed by Jaume Collet-Serra.
- Unlike U, 2011 – documentary about the illegal and criminal graffiti trainwriter scene in Berlin. Directed by Björn Birg and Henrik Regel.
- Urban Explorer, 2011 – horror-thriller film about four young urban explorers who meet up in Berlin via the internet to explore the subterranean relicts of Nazi Germany. But when tragedy strikes the group's leader, they soon realize not all things go according to plan. Directed by Andy Fetscher.
- Woman in Love (Rubbeldiekatz), 2011 – a young actor at Berlin Vaganten Bühne theater wants to play in a Hollywood Nazi movie filmed in Berlin and Babelsberg Studio. So he dresses up like a woman, gets a female role and falls in love with the female lead. Directed by Detlev Buck.

=== 2012 ===
- Bar 25 – Tage außerhalb der Zeit, 2012 – documentary following the creators of famous techno club "Bar 25". Directed by Britta Mischer and Nana Yuriko.
- Berlin Dance Battle, 2012 – a young street dancer comes to Berlin to take part at an underground dance battle. But he has to find a group first and he has to learn much. Directed by Robert Franke.
- Berlin für Helden, 2012 – five young people live with relish a new excessive and bohemian life in Berlin. Directed by Klaus Lemke.
- Berliner Tagebuch, 2012 – immigrants and artists from several countries living in Berlin are asked why the metropolis became a new home and a source of inspiration for them. Directed by Rosemarie Blank.
- Bliss (Glück), 2012 – a female refugee from Eastern Europe, working as a prostitute, and a homeless punk with his dog form a relationship in Berlin. Directed by Doris Dörrie.
- Cause I Have the Looks (Weil ich schöner bin), 2012 – together with her mother, a Colombian teenager lives illegally in Berlin and attends school regularly. When they get in contact with the police they have to hide and need the help of friends. Directed by Frieder Schlaich.
- A Coffee in Berlin (Oh Boy!), 2012 – portrait of a young man who drops out of university and ends up wandering the streets of Berlin. Directed by Jan Ole Gerster.
- Doll, the Fatso & Me (Puppe, Icke & der Dicke), 2012 – a courier returns from Paris to Berlin and gives two hitchhikers a ride. One of them is a fat dumb man, the other is a blind French girl searching for the father of her unborn baby in Berlin. Directed by Felix Stienz.
- Dust on Our Hearts (Staub auf unseren Herzen), 2012 – a young and unsuccessful actress in Berlin fights to cut the cord from her overbearing mother. Directed by Hanna Doose.
- Fuck for Forest, 2012 – the documentary follows Fuck for Forest, a non-profit environmental organization in Berlin, which raises money for rescuing the world's rainforests by producing pornographic material or having sex in public. Directed by Michal Marczak.
- Kaddish for a Friend (Kaddisch für einen Freund), 2012 – a Jewish senior and a Lebanese boy in Kreuzberg district are enemies. But when they get in danger of losing their homes they start to work together. Directed by Leo Khasin.
- Move (3 Zimmer/Küche/Bad), 2012 – eight friends in Berlin support each other to relocate and to find new partners. Directed by Dietrich Brüggemann.
- Our Little Differences (Die feinen Unterschiede), 2012 – a successful doctor for artificial insemination in Berlin has to help his Bulgarian cleaning lady to release her grown-up daughter. Directed by Sylvie Michel.
- The Pursuit of Unhappiness (Anleitung zum Unglücklichsein), 2012 – the female owner of a delicatessen shop in Kreuzberg is difficult, superstitious, pessimistic and quarreling with her childhood. But when she meets a photographer with a touchy dog, her life changes. Based upon the book from Paul Watzlawick and directed by Sherry Hormann.
- Russian Disco (Russendisko), 2012 – based on the book by Wladimir Kaminer and telling the story of three young Jewish Russians who come to Berlin in 1990 seeking for work, love and a new perspective. Directed by Oliver Ziegenbalg.
- St George's Day, 2012 – two elderly and famous British Cousin gangsters have angered a Russian competitor. To reconcile him and to pay their debts they undertake an audacious diamond heist in Berlin. Directed by Frank Harper.
- Zettl, 2012 – a Bavarian chauffeur in Berlin is engaged by a Swiss investor to become editor-in-chief of a new online tabloid newspaper on politicians in the capital city. Directed by Helmut Dietl.

=== 2013 ===
- An Apartment in Berlin (Ein Apartment in Berlin), 2013 – three young Jewish people from Israel are asked by a German filmmaker to live in a flat in Prenzlauer Berg district, from where a Jewish family was deported in 1943. Directed by Alice Agneskirchner.
- The Berlin File, 2013 – a North Korean agent in Berlin is betrayed and cut loose when a weapons deal is exposed. Directed by Ryoo Seung-wan.
- La Deutsche Vita, 2013 – documentary on Italians living in Berlin. Thousands come every year to stay and many of them have to decide whether they are still immigrants or already Berliners. Directed by Alessandro Cassigoli and Tania Masi.
- Einer fehlt, 2013 – everybody in his street in Prenzlauer Berg district knows the kindly greeting old man, but nobody knows much about him. When he dies the neighbours miss him and collect money to pay for his funeral. Directed by Mechthild Gaßner.
- The Fifth Estate, 2013 – in 2007, Julian Assange and Daniel Domscheit-Berg meet for the first time at Chaos Communication Congress in Berlin. The whistleblowers and supporters publish significant secret information on WikiLeaks what receives praise as well as criticism. Directed by Bill Condon.
- Grossstadtklein, 2013 – a young man from the Mecklenburg-Vorpommern provincial backwater is forced by his family to absolve a practical training in Berlin and to live with his cousin. Directed by Tobias Wiemann.
- HARTs 5 – Geld ist nicht alles, 2013 – four unemployed men who receive Hartz IV fight against capitalism, gentrification, and they want to save their former Kindergarten in Prenzlauer Berg district. Directed by Julian Tyrasa.
- Hotel Adlon: A Family Saga (Das Adlon. Eine Familiensaga), 2013 – drama in three parts on the legendary Berlin Hotel Adlon and the family of its founder Lorenz Adlon from 1907 until the reopening in 1997. Directed by Uli Edel.
- Kaptn Oskar, 2013 – a reserved young man's ex-girlfriend has set his flat in Berlin on fire and also stalks him while he tries to build up a normal relationship with his new girlfriend. Directed by Tom Lass.
- Kokowääh 2, 2013 – following Kokowääh, the father has now to live with his daughter and her mother, because he became jobless and wants to become a film producer. Directed by and starring Til Schweiger.
- Night Over Berlin (Nacht über Berlin), 2013 – a Jewish doctor and SPD-deputy at Reichstag faces the rising rows between Communists and Nazis in Berlin, the growing antisemitism, the Nazi Machtergreifung until the Reichstag fire, followed by the end of the key civil liberties in 1933. Directed by Friedemann Fromm.
- Shark Alarm at Müggel Lake (Hai-Alarm am Müggelsee), 2013 – after a shark bit off the bath attendant's forearm at lake Müggelsee, the politicians set up a committee, and a shark hunter is engaged. Directed by Leander Haußmann and Sven Regener.
- Sources of Life (Quellen des Lebens), 2013 – during the 1960s an emancipated writer neglects her son, so he grows up alternately with his grand parents in Franconia and his negligent father in West Berlin. Directed by Oskar Roehler and based upon his own life without his mother Gisela Elsner.
- The Strange Little Cat (Das merkwürdige Kätzchen), 2013 – A family in a house, and a chain of events that take place, on an ordinary evening that they plan to have dinner with relatives. Directed by Ramon Zürcher.
- The Tragedy of a Simple Man (Woyzeck), 2013 – the story of Woyzeck by Georg Büchner transferred into modern Berlin-Wedding district. Woyzeck is exploited by a dehumanised doctor and an Arabian restaurant owner, dreams of being just with Marie and their child, but catches her coquetting with a mafia boss. Directed by Nuran David Calis.
- Ummah – Among Friends (Ummah – Unter Freunden), 2013 – after being wounded in a failed operation against Neo-Nazis, a young undercover Verfassungsschutz agent is sent to Neukölln district where he becomes friends with two Turkish Arab electrical device dealers. Directed by Cüneyt Kaya.
- West, 2013 – in 1978 a single mother can escape from East Germany to West Berlin. At Marienfelde refugee transit camp she is confronted with her past by Allied Secret Services. Directed by Christian Schwochow.
- Wetlands (Feuchtgebiete), 2013 – a body fluid-obsessed teenager in Berlin has an anal fissure and ends up stuck in the hospital where she charms a handsome male nurse and schemes to reunite her parents. Directed by David Wnendt.

=== 2014 ===
- Amour Fou, 2014 – between 1809 and 1811 Heinrich von Kleist meets Henriette Vogel in Berlin and his love for Henriette begins to blossom. He asks her to join him in death when she is diagnosed with uterine cancer. They commit suicide together at the Kleine Wannsee. Directed by Jessica Hausner.
- Anderson, 2014 – documentary on Sascha Anderson who became an iconic member of the cultural underground scene in Prenzlauer Berg during the 1980s and at the same time spied on all his friends for the Stasi. Directed by Annekatrin Hendel.
- Berlin Stories, 2014 – writers and literary critics analyse and discuss famous Berlin novels and the impact that the metropolis had and still has on authors who live in the city or stayed for a period of time. Directed by Simone Dobmeier and Torsten Striegnitz.
- A Blind Hero: The Love of Otto Weidt (Ein blinder Held – die Liebe des Otto Weidt), 2014 – during the Holocaust blind factory owner Otto Weidt leads a broom and scrubber workshop at Hackesche Höfe where he hides Jews. By bribing Gestapo officials and driving to concentration camps he can save the lives of several people. Directed by Kai Christiansen.
- Citizenfour, 2014 – starting in Berlin, filmmaker Laura Poitras begins to research a documentary on state-controlled observation and whistleblowers when she receives e-mails from Edward Snowden. Together with Glenn Greenwald and Ewen MacAskill she travels to Hong Kong to interview him.
- Daughters (Töchter), 2014 – a mother comes to Berlin to search for her missing daughter. While she cannot find her, a homeless girl is longing for her friendship. Directed by Maria Speth.
- Dragan Wende - West Berlin, 2014 – an eccentric Yugoslav had a good time in West Berlin working as a nightclub doorman and enjoying privileges. After the fall of Berlin Wall he has to cope with a living as underdog. Directed by Lena Müller and Dragan von Petrovic.
- Frauenherzen, 2014 – the lives of five women with totally different ways of living but similar relationship problems encounter in Berlin during one week. Directed by Sophie Allet-Coche.
- Die Insel – Westberlin zwischen Mauerbau und Mauerfall, 2014 – two-part documentary on the specific situation of West Berlin behind the Iron Curtain between 1961 and 1989. Directed by Stefan Aust and Claus Richter.
- The Limits of Patience (Das Ende der Geduld), 2014 – a dedicated juvenile magistrate initiates the "Neuköllner Modell" against juvenile delinquency that streamlined procedures and targeted an appearance before court within 3–5 weeks. In 2010 she hangs herself in a forest. Based on the life and book of Kirsten Heisig and directed by Christian Wagner.
- Mein Berlin, dein Berlin, 2014 – several artists from East and West Berlin meet and show each other the places where they grew up in the divided city. Directed by Tim Evers and Jens Staeder.
- Mietrebellen, 2014 – documents the transformation of Berlin from a tenants city into a popular investment target and tenants struggling against their displacement, what culminates in a new urban protest movement. Directed by Gertrud Schulte Westenberg and Matthias Coers.
- A Most Wanted Man, 2014 – espionage-thriller set basically in Hamburg dealing with Islamist terrorism and money laundering. Minor scenes such as a meeting in the Internal ministry are set in Berlin. Featuring Philip Seymour Hoffman and directed by Anton Corbijn.
- Open the Wall (Bornholmer Straße), 2014 – after the famous press conference on November 9, 1989 by Günter Schabowski thousands of East Germans begin gathering at Bornholmer Straße border crossing. Because of the non-distinctive command status Lieutenant-Colonel Harald Jäger opens Berlin Wall. Directed by Christian Schwochow.
- Spirit Berlin, 2014 – a young and inwardly disrupted man visits several spiritual and religious groups in Berlin to find peace. Finally he finds the love of a female young and beautiful Yoga teacher. Directed by Kordula Hildebrandt.
- Welcome Goodbye, 2014 – documentary on the growing tourism in Berlin and connected problems like rising prices, housing shortage, gentrification and hostility toward tourists. Directed by Nana Rebhan.
- Who Am I – No System Is Safe, 2014 – thriller about a hacker group that gears towards international prominence. Featuring Tom Schilling, Elyas M'Barek and Trine Dyrholm. Directed by Baran bo Odar.

=== 2015 ===
- Berlin East Side Gallery, 2015 – documentary on the famous Berlin Wall memorial East Side Gallery, its origin in 1990, the reconstruction, and the constant threat by building projects like Mediaspree. Directed by Karin Kaper and Dirk Szuszies.
- Victoria, 2015 – a young Spanish woman meets four strange guys in nightly Berlin and gets roped by them into a bank robbery. Shot in a single continuous take and directed by Sebastian Schipper.
- Punk Berlin 1982 (Tod den Hippies!! Es lebe der Punk), 2015. Directed by Oskar Roehler.
- The Man from U.N.C.L.E., 2015 – In the early 1960s, CIA agent Napoleon Solo and KGB operative Illya Kuryakin participate in a joint mission against a mysterious criminal organization, which is working to proliferate nuclear weapons. Directed by Guy Ritchie.
- Bridge of Spies, 2015 – During the Cold War, an American lawyer is recruited to defend an arrested Soviet spy in court, and then help the CIA facilitate an exchange of the spy for the Soviet captured American U2 spy plane pilot, Francis Gary Powers. Directed by Steven Spielberg.
- B-Movie: Lust & Sound in West-Berlin, 2015 – music film, documentary about the avant-garde music scene in West-Berlin and the squats scene during the decade 1979-1989, before the fall of the Berlin Wall. Directed by Jörg A. Hoppe, Klaus Maeck and Heiko Lange.

=== 2016 ===
- Captain America: Civil War, 2016 – Bucky Barnes, Captain America, and Black Panther chase in the tunnel, then they go to the Joint Terrorist Centre to confront Everett Ross.
- Jason Bourne, 2016 – Jason Bourne goes to Berlin in search of information.

=== 2017 ===
- Babylon Berlin, 2017 – crime-drama television series that takes place in 1929 Berlin during the Weimar Republic. It follows a police inspector on who is on a secret mission to dismantle an extortion ring, and a young stenotypist who is aspiring to work as a police inspector. Co-directed by Tom Tykwer, Hendrik Handloegten, and Achim von Borries.
- Charité, TV series that takes place in 1888/1889 in Berlin at Charité and between 1943 and 1945 in Berlin at Charité
- Atomic Blonde
- Old Agent Men (Kundschafter des Friedens), 2017 - four former agents of the Stasi from Berlin are hired by the BND to rescue the kidnapped president of a fictional former Soviet Republic. Directed by Robert Thalheim.

=== 2018 ===
- Mute
- Suspiria

== 2020s ==
=== 2020 ===
HAGER (2022) A police officer sets out to find a drug that gives its users Visions of hell. Directed by Kevin Kopacka

=== 2022 ===
- The Contractor, 2022 – An ex-marine working as a private black ops contractor is betrayed by his employers.
- John Wick: Chapter 4
- The Forger (Der Passfälscher), 2022 – the true story of Cioma Schönhaus, a young Jewish man, who escaped the Gestapo and saves lives during the Nazi era in Berlin thanks to his ability to forge passports. Directed by Maggie Peren.

=== 2023 ===
- Capital B - Wem gehört Berlin?, 2023 - five-part documentary on the political, economical and cultural development of Berlin between 1989 and 2020. Directed by Florian Opitz.

== See also ==
- 1920s Berlin
- Berlin Film Festival
- Cinema of Germany
- European cinema
- German Expressionism
- List of German films
- List of fiction set in Berlin
- Ufa
- Category:Films shot in Berlin
