= Nine Lives (2011 film) =

- 9 Leben
- Directed by: Maria Speth
- Written by: Maria Speth
- Production companies: Madonnen Film, Zweites Deutsches Fernsehen (ZDF)
- Release date: 2011
- Country: Germany
- Language: German

9 Lives (Original title: 9 Leben) is a 2011 German documentary film directed by Maria Speth, who also wrote the script.

== Synopsis ==
Shot in Berlin in 2010, the documentary film is about nine homeless youths who live on the streets for various reasons. It tries to explore why they live on the street. All nine have experienced family neglect, domestic violence, and social prejudices. Rather than speaking to them on the street, they are all shown against the same neutral background of a studio, where they talk about themselves to the camera. This is an apparent endeavor to avoid sensationalism and at the same time promote understanding of the social problems of young people and why they end up living on the streets temporarily or permanently.
