= Feiern =

- Directed by: Maja Classen
- Written by: Maja Classen
- Screenplay by: Maja Classen
- Produced by: Maja Classen & Julia Titze
- Starring: Oscar Axelrod Jan Behrendt; Lisbeth Eckendorff; André Galluzzi; Nickolas Gleber; Nick Höppner; Lee Jones; Carsten Klemann; Inga Königstadt; Tim Kreutzfeldt; Freta Namboutin; Lucien Nicolet; Ewan Pearson; Anett Petersen; José Mari Polintan; Rejne Rittel; Cora Schneider; Thilo Schneider; Ralf Swinley; Julie van Wart; Ricardo Villalobos; Alexander Vögtlin Saskia Willich
- Cinematography: Andreas Bergmann
- Edited by: Sylke Rohrlach
- Music by: Nick Höppner
- Production company: HFF (Hochschule für Film und Fernsehen "Konrad Wolff")
- Release dates: 3 November 2006 (Berlin, Germany)
- Running time: 81 minutes
- Country: Germany
- Language: German

Feiern is a 2006 documentary film about the electronic dance music scene (e.g., house music, techno). Maja Classen wrote and directed the film.

== Synopsis ==
The film features people from Berlin's electronic dance music scenes (primarily house music and techno, but especially their “minimal” sub-scenes). The majority of the film consists of footage of individual interviews, cut and interpolated together to create narratives around certain themes, such as music, drugs, love, addiction, friendship, and sexuality. Among the interviewees were DJs, bouncers, bartenders, and partygoers.

The material for the film included 19 interviews, 56 nights (i.e., nighttime music events), and 13 musical tracks.

== Production and release ==
The film was made under the direction of Maja Classen, with cinematography by Andreas Bergmann and editing by Sylke Rohrlach. The poetic prose that opens and closes the film was written by German author, playwright, and essayist Rainald Goetz.

The film premiered on 22 March 2006 in the Kino Babylon Theater in Berlin. Afterwards, it was shown in several film festivals, including achtung berlin—new film award and the 44th Gijon International Film Festival in Spain. On 3 November 2006 the record label interGroove Tonträger Vertriebs GmbH released the film for DVD distribution under the title Feiern with a 16-year licensing term. The DVD was distributed with a free CD that included music from the film's soundtrack.

== Soundtrack ==
1. Hey-O-Hansen - Moon (Jack Is A Simple Fella Mix By Thaddi) 06:50
2. Isolée - Krypt 06:53
3. Pigon - Maria Durch Ein Dornwald Ging 07:27
4. Gater - Taboo 04:17
5. My My - Serpentine 07:58
6. Seelenluft - Manila (Ewan Pearson Remix) 03:39
7. D'NTEL - The Dream Of Evan And Chan (Superpitcher Remix) 07:06
8. Keith Tucker - It's A Mood 05:04
9. UND! - Cocopuffs 05:01
10. Lopazz - I Need Ya 05:25
11. DJ Naughty - Rojo Caliente 06:44
12. Plastikman - Ping Pong
13. Âme - Rej

== See also ==
- Resident Advisor
