= Maja Classen =

German film director and screenwriter

- Born: 28 December 1974 (age 51)
- Occupations: Director and filmmaker

Maja Classen (born 28 December 1974 in Heidelberg) is a German film director and screenwriter, primarily known for her 2006 documentary on the Berlin techno scene, Feiern.

== Biography ==
She studied film production at the Hochschule für Film und Fernsehen Potsdam "Konrad Wolff" (The Konrad Wolff University of Film and Television, in Potsdam, Germany). During her time there, she produced several short films, including the documentary film Feiern (2006); this film was a portrait of the Berlin techno scene in the early 2000s, composed primarily of interview footage. The film was premiered at Kino Babylon in Berlin in 2006, made the circuit of film festivals, and was released on DVD in the same year. She also completed her studies in 2006 with the documentary film Osdorf, a sensitive portrait of young first- and second-generation immigrant men with long police records; this film was released in 2007 and also made the rounds of film festivals. Maja Classen lives and works in Berlin.

== Filmography ==
- 2006: Feiern, documentary film (screenwriter, director)
- 2007: Osdorf, documentary film (screenwriter, director)
- 2009: 24 Hours Berlin, television documentary (director)
