= 18:15 ab Ostkreuz =

2006 film

- German poster
- Directed by: Jörn Hartmann
- Written by: Jörn Hartmann
- Produced by: Michael Huber; Michael Reichenberg
- Starring: Ades Zabel; Andreja Schneider
- Cinematography: Thorsten Falk
- Edited by: Jörn Hartmann
- Music by: Matthias Koeninger; Stefan Kuschner
- Release dates: 11 February 2006 (Berlin Film Festival); 6 April 2006 (Germany)
- Running time: 110 minutes
- Country: Germany
- Language: German

18:15 ab Ostkreuz is a German film. The film showed at the 2006 Berlin International Film Festival.

== Cast ==
- Ades Zabel as Karin Hoene / Hürriyet Lachmann
- Andreja Schneider als Rosa Brathuhn / Verena Strunzig
