= Ivory (name) =

Name list

- Gender: Unisex
- Language: English

Origin
- Meaning: "White as elephant tusks"

Other names
- Variant form: Ivorie

Ivory is a unisex given name and a surname. It means 'White as elephant tusks'.

In 2024, it was the 404th most popular name for baby girls in the United States.

== Notable people ==
- Ivory (wrestler), American wrestler Lisa Mary Moretti (born 1961)

=== Surname ===
- George Ivory (disambiguation), several people
- Horace Ivory (born 1954), American football player
- James Ivory (disambiguation), several people
- Judith Ivory, pen name of Judy Cuevas, American romance novelist
- Thomas Ivory (1709–1779), British architect
- Thomas Ivory (Irish architect) (died 1786)
- Trevor Ivory, British political candidate
- William (Billy) Ivory (born 1964), British screenwriter, playwright and actor

=== Given name ===
- Ivory Aquino (born 1977/1978), Filipina-American actress
- Ivory Lee Brown (born 1969), American football player
- Ivory Crockett (born 1948), American sprinter
- Ivory Chittison (1908–1967), American jazz pianist
- Ivory Chamberlain (1821–1881), American editor
- Ivory Glaze, drag performer
- Ivory Harris, American drug trafficker
- Ivory O. Hillis Jr. (born 1930), American politician
- Ivory Joe Hunter (1914–1974), American R&B singer, songwriter and pianist
- Ivory Kimball (1843–1916), American lawyer and judge
- Ivory Latta (born 1984), American basketball player
- Ivory V. Nelson, American educator
- Ivory Nwokorie, Nigerian powerlifter
- Ivory Quinby (1817–1869), American businessman
- Ivory Sully (born 1957), American football player
- Ivory Lee Toldson (died 2012), American psychologist
- Ivory A. Toldson (born c. 1974), American academic
- Ivory Torrey Thigpen (born 1978), American politician
- Ivory Williams (born 1985), American sprinter
- Ivory Winston (1911–1996), African-American singer
