= Ebony (disambiguation) =

Ebony is a dense black hardwood.

Ebony may also refer to:

== Media ==
- Ebony (magazine)
- Ebony (band), a New Zealand band
- Ebony (album), an album by Yo-Yo
- Ebony, a fictional character from TV series The Tribe

== Places ==
- Part of Stone-cum-Ebony, a civil parish in Kent
- Ebony, Kent, a hamlet south of Ashford in Kent, South East England
- Ebony, Virginia, a census-designated place in Brunswick County, Virginia, United States

== Plants and their wood ==
- Diospyros, genus containing a number of species with black or pale-streaked wood
  - Ceylon ebony (Diospyros ebenum)
  - African Ebony (Diospyros mespiliformis)
  - Black-and-white Ebony, Pale Moon Ebony (Diospyros malabarica)
  - Makassar Ebony (Diospyros celebica)
  - Coromandel Ebony (Diospyros melanoxylon)
  - Mauritius Ebony (Diospyros tessellaria)
  - Mun Ebony (Diospyros mun), a critically endangered plant
  - Myrtle Ebony (Diospyros pentamera)
  - New Guinea Ebony (Diospyros insularis), an endangered plant
  - Queensland Ebony (Diospyros humilis)
  - Red-fruited Ebony (Diospyros mabacea)
- Trochetiopsis ebenus or St Helena ebony, dark coloured wood used for local inlay work
- Brya ebenus, Jamaican Ebony
- Ebenopsis ebano, Texas Ebony

== Other uses ==
- Ebony (given name)
- Ebony, a female professional wrestler from the Gorgeous Ladies of Wrestling
- Ebony Simpson (died 1992), female Australian murder victim
- Dark skin
- Black people

== See also ==
- Ebony and Ivory (disambiguation)
- Evony
