= Tahmoor railway station =

Railway station in New South Wales, Australia

Tahmoor
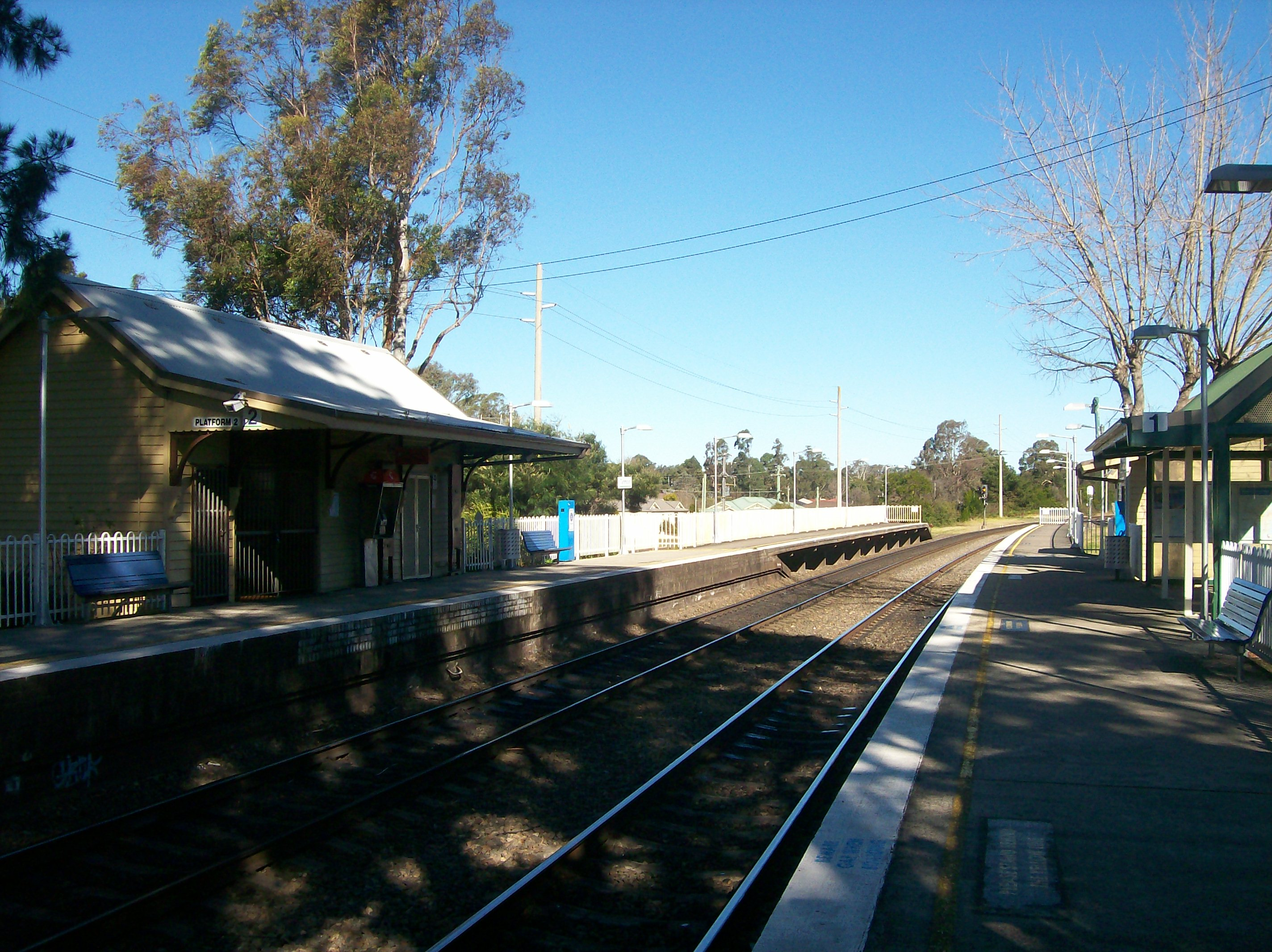
- Southbound view from Platform 2, January 2006

General information
- Location: George Street, Tahmoor; Australia
- Coordinates: 34°13′25″S 150°35′24″E
- Elevation: 271 metres (889 ft)
- Owner: Transport Asset Manager of New South Wales
- Operator: Sydney Trains
- Line: Main Southern
- Distance: 94.49 kilometres (58.71 mi) from Central
- Platforms: 2 side
- Tracks: 2

Construction
- Structure type: Ground
- Accessible: Assisted (ramp)

Other information
- Status: Weekdays: Staffed: 5.45am to 1.45pm: Weekends and public holidays: Unstaffed
- Station code: TAH
- Website: Transport for NSW

History
- Opened: 13 July 1919

Passengers
- 2025: 74,205 (year); 203 (daily) (Sydney Trains, NSW TrainLink)

Services
Preceding station	Intercity Trains	Following station
Bargo towards Moss Vale or Goulburn	Southern Highlands Line	Picton towards Campbelltown or Central

New South Wales Heritage Register
- Official name: Tahmoor Railway Station Group; Lupton's Inn
- Type: State heritage (complex / group)
- Designated: 2 April 1999
- Reference no.: 1258
- Type: Railway Platform / Station
- Category: Transport – Rail
Location

Tahmoor railway station is a heritage-listed railway station located on the Main Southern line in the town of Tahmoor, part of the Wollondilly Shire local government area of New South Wales, Australia. The property was added to the New South Wales State Heritage Register on 2 April 1999 where it is also known as the Tahmoor Railway Station Group and Lupton's Inn. The station opened on 13 July 1919 at the same time as a new alignment between Picton and Mittagong railway stations.

== History ==
The Tahmoor Railway Precinct is located on the Main South line. The "Great Southern Railway" originally opened from Picton to Mittagong via a loop line in 1867. In 1919, the Main South line from Picton was deviated to Mittagong to ease the grades. The new line virtually follows the line of the Great South Road taking the main line away from Thirlmere, Buxton, Balmoral and Hilltop and passing through Tahmoor, Bargo and Yerrinbool.

The construction of the new deviation caused concern for the towns along the existing line anxious the deviation would have a detrimental effect on property and development: "Samuel Emmett who held 1,619 hectares (4,000 acres) of land near Hilltop could no longer hope to make any profit from it. Not to be thwarted, Sam purchased hundreds of acres of land near where it was proposed to build a new railway platform along the Bargo road (and) subdivided the land into some 600 building blocks which now form the nucleus of the township of Tahmoor...The deviation works brought hundreds of men and their families to the area creating an urgent need for postal facilities and shops. Sam Emmett was again ahead of the rest, applying for the re establishment of a post office which he proposed to be in premises attached to a shop which he was in the process of building... The application for a post office was approved, however the identity of the location was still in question... Sam's preference of 'Bronzewing Park'...The Railway Department advised that the new platform would be called "Tahmoor", Aboriginal for bronzewing pigeon. In order to expedite the matter, the Postal Department took the side of the Railway Department and directed that the new Post Office be called "Tahmoor". Tahmoor Post Office commenced operations on 1 September 1916 with Sam as Postmaster".

Tahmoor Station opened with the completion of the double track deviation between Picton and Mittagong which opened on 13 July 1919. The station was constructed with two side platforms with a small timber station building on the Down Platform (platform 2). The building is a standard A2 building which was part of a standard set of designs introduced from the 1900s and reissued again in 1913. Most examples date from 1910/20s. The smaller A1 – A4 structures were wayside buildings predominantly constructed of timber weatherboard in country locations with a gabled roof and continuous awning.

The station also featured an A1 standard sitting room and WC on the Up Platform (platform 1). A lamp room was also constructed on the Up Platform after 1919 and later converted to a WC.

The waiting room on the Up Platform was destroyed by fire in 1979. In 1989 a standard open shelter was built on the Up platform which protects a ticket vending machine. The original 1919 WC has also been altered, probably also in 1989.

== Description ==
The complex comprises a type 11 station building for two platforms, erected in 1919; brick platforms 1 and 2, erected in 1919 and extended with open elevated concrete slabs; a timber lamp room on platform 1, erected c. 1920s; a brick toilet structure with corrugated iron curved roof on Platform 1, erected in 1919, with modifications in c. 1989; and a shelter, erected in 1989.

=== Station building (1919) ===
The Station Building is a standard "A2" (type 11) building and is a simple two room building with a waiting room and ticket office. The building is clad in weatherboard and has a gabled roof clad in corrugated iron which extends as a continuous awning over the platform. The awning is supported on steel brackets and features timber valance detail to the awning ends, which is the only decorative detailing.

The original platforms are face brick but have been extended most likely in c. 1989 with elevated concrete slabs.

=== Lamp building (c. 1920s) ===
A small single room weatherboard building with skillion roof sloping towards platform clad in corrugated iron with simple timber supports for a short extended awning.

=== Toilet structure – (1919, c. 1989) ===
A small single room brick building with corrugated iron curved roof.

=== Condition ===
Generally in good condition. The extant station buildings have a high level of integrity. The group has however been diminished by the removal of the second waiting room building following a fire in c. 1979.

=== Modifications and dates ===
- 1919 goods siding laid in.
- 1941 goods siding reduced in length.

== Platforms and services ==
Tahmoor has two side platforms. It is serviced by Sydney Trains Southern Highlands Line services travelling between Campbelltown and Moss Vale with limited morning services to Sydney Central and limited evening services to Goulburn.

Platform	Line	Stopping pattern	Notes
1	SHL	services to Campbelltown morning services to Sydney Central (1 weekday, 2 weekend)	
2	SHL	services to Moss Vale evening services to Goulburn (2 weekday, 1 weekend)	

== Heritage listing ==
As at 9 November 2010, Tahmoor Railway Station is of state significance for its key role in the development of the local area and the establishment of the town of Tahmoor. The site is significant for its ability to demonstrate the impact of the railways on shaping inland settlements following the deviation of the Great Southern line from Picton to Mittagong in 1919. The small timber station building is a rare example of the standard A2 station building issued in the early 20th century and constructed at small wayside country locations throughout NSW. The small timber lamp room and toilet structure are also rare and complement the setting of the small station group.

Tahmoor railway station was listed on the New South Wales State Heritage Register on 2 April 1999 having satisfied the following criteria.

The place is important in demonstrating the course, or pattern, of cultural or natural history in New South Wales.

Tahmoor Railway Station is of significance for its key role in the development of the local area and the establishment of the town of Tahmoor. The site is significant for its ability to demonstrate the impact of the railways on shaping inland settlements following the deviation of the Great Southern line from Picton to Mittagong in 1919.

The place is important in demonstrating aesthetic characteristics and/or a high degree of creative or technical achievement in New South Wales.

The small timber station building is a good example of the standard A2 station building issued in the early 20th century and constructed at small wayside country locations throughout NSW. The small timber lamp room complements the setting of the small station group.

The place has a strong or special association with a particular community or cultural group in New South Wales for social, cultural or spiritual reasons.

The site is of social significance to the local community on account of its lengthy association for providing an important source of employment, trade and social interaction for the local area. The site is significant for its ability to contribute to the local community's sense of place, is a distinctive feature of the daily life of many community members, and provides a connection to the local community's past.

The place possesses uncommon, rare or endangered aspects of the cultural or natural history of New South Wales.

The small station building and lamp room are rare examples of extant timber railway buildings in NSW, as many examples have been replaced by modern structures. The toilet structure is also a rare, albeit altered, surviving example of a standard structure, with only very few remaining in NSW.

The place is important in demonstrating the principal characteristics of a class of cultural or natural places/environments in New South Wales.

The site has representative significance for its collection of railway structures including the station building, lamp room and toilet structure that collectively demonstrate widespread early 20th-century railway customs, activities and design in NSW, and are representative of similar items that are found in other railway sites across the state.

== See also ==
- List of railway stations in New South Wales
