= Bargo Rural Fire Brigade =

Operational area
- Country: Australia
- State: New South Wales
- Local government area: Wollondilly Shire
- Locale: Bargo

Facilities and equipment
- Stations: 1
- Wildland: 1 Cat. 1 heavy tanker; 1 Cat. 11; 1 Personnel carrier; 1 Cat. 17 (box trailer)

Website
- Official website

The Bargo Rural Fire Brigade is a unit of the New South Wales Rural Fire Service that services the local Bargo and Wollondilly Shire community in New South Wales, Australia. The brigade provides help to return normality to residents and visitors of the Wollondilly Shire in cases of bush fire. The brigade primarily services the Bargo area, including the Hume Highway from Picton Road, Wilton to Yanderra.

== History ==
Bargo Rural Fire Brigade (RFB) was established in the Bargo township at 3:00 pm in the Bargo Hall on 26 December 1939. Convening the meeting was Constable Quinell of Bargo Police Station. The Establishment office bearers were:

- President - Mr A Millard
- Vice President - Mr D Dwyer, E Faulks
- Secretary - F Buchanan
- Treasurer - Mr G Hughes
- Captain - Constable Quinell
- Deputy Captain - D Hogan
- Lieutenants (Deputies) - C Cosgrove, H Smith, N Carter, L Lupton

The Brigade area was fixed as the same area of the Bargo Police Patrol (Pheasants Nest, Yanderra, Bargo). Bargo-Yanderra Volunteer Bush Fire Brigade was established. Membership to the brigade was 2 shillings (approx. 25 cents). A letter was sent to Wollondilly Shire Council seeking assistance to purchase equipment. The council advised it was unable to assist as there were no funds.

The first issued equipment supplied to the Bargo RFB was from the council on 4 August 1943. This was 1 fern hook, 6 rakes, 3 hoes, 1 shovel, 5 beaters, 3 water bags, 1 knapsacks and 3 files. The first fire tanker Bargo RFB had was delivered on 1 September 1959. This tanker was a former RAAF Ford Blitz. The cost of the truck was A£350 (approx. $700).

The original station was built on Kader Street in Bargo. After the 1968 fires it was then moved opposite the Bargo Public School, now used as an illegal car park. During the 1980s, the station was once again moved, down the road to the corner of Avon Dam Road and Reservoir Road. Upon establishment of the New South South Wales Bush Fire Service (est. soon after Ash Wednesday fires in 1983s), Bargo RFB became a branch of the New South Wales Bush Fire Service. In 1997 the Bush Fire Service became the New South Wales Rural Fire Service, Bargo Volunteer Bush Fire Brigade followed suit and became Bargo Rural Fire Brigade.

On 14 April 1997 a Bargo RFB struck a close call to tragedy, when the brigade's Category 1 tanker was involved in a free-way pile up on the Hume Highway. The truck was damaged substantially, and fortunately there were no fatalities.

The emblem of Bargo RFB was created in 1998. Native fauna to the area were considered. A tribute to the history of the Bargo area was brought forward. The first sightings of the Lyrebird, Wombat and Koala were recorded by European explorers along Bargo River. The wombat was declined as it was the animal the local State Emergency Service used. The Lyrebird, known to be mistaken as a Pheasant, was rejected, as the township of Pheasants Nest bordered Bargo, so the koala was chosen. Designed by a member, the Bargo Koala has been the image placed on all Bargo RFB fire trucks since its induction. The koala can also be seen on members uniforms as a patch.

== Life members ==
Life members are members of Bargo Rural Fire Brigade who have significantly contributed to the Brigade over the period of their active membership. These people are acknowledged by fellow members and are given the honorary position as a life member. A life member is the highest achievement that a New South Wales Rural Fire Service Member can be acknowledged with.

== Significant incidents ==
=== Fire brigade tanker involved in freeway accident ===
On 14 April 1997 at 1:59 am Bargo Bush Fire Brigade received a call to attend a motor vehicle accident northbound on the Hume Highway, just south of the Bargo exit. The crew pulled out of the station in Bargo 4 (Cat. 9) & Bargo 1 (Cat. 1). The crew arrived onto the highway heading south, responding to assist Mittagong brigade hazmat for an oil spill that was located on the north bound side at the Tennessee Orchiad. The crew were travelling along the freeway at the southern Bargo exit ramp and approached a police car sitting on the side of the road in the southbound lanes trying to slow traffic down from the accident on the northbound side. Bargo 4 received a call from Bargo 1 to say that the visibility was poor due to heavy fog. As the crew travelled further down the freeway, they reached extremely poor conditions and hit extremely bad fog conditions. All emergency lights were turned on, but the crew could still see nothing. The crew pulled over on the left hand side near the side guard railing to see if they could see anything. Nothing was visible, so one crew member went to get out of the truck to help direct Bargo 1 to the north-bound motor vehicle accident.

As the member opened the door and started to climb down, next minute, a large bang occurred - Bargo 1 got hit from the rear by a paper truck that was travelling along at 110 kilometres per hour (68 mph). Bargo 1 was hit so hard that the truck spun around and left the crew member lying in the middle of the road. As Bargo 1 sat on the side of the road, with the left side facing towards to the south bound traffic. The driver was stuck inside the truck with the door jammed. While the rest of the crew were assisting the member injured climbing out that was lying on the road. As the driver was stuck inside, the truck was hit by a blue circle cement tanker that was travelling at a speed of 83 kilometres per hour (52 mph). Bargo 1 almost rolled but was stopped by the side guard rail. A crew member jumped up and dragged the trapped driver out of the right hand window. As they jumped out of the truck, another bang was heard, then another and then another. The crew tried to get further away from the road, as they heard more trucks coming in, another bang was heard, then another, then another.

There were no fatalities that night; however two crew members injured. One was released later that day, and the other was released from hospital several days later.

Following the accident and a subsequent investigation, the NSW Fire Brigade fire fighting vehicles mandated a rear fog lamp, optional in Australia, to help combat such outcomes.

== Public events ==
Each year Bargo Rural Fire Brigade holds a Santa run for the Bargo community. This is run on 24 December from 1400. Children each year have run to their front yard greeting Santa, and in return Santa will throw lollies to the side of the road. Lucky children receive a blast of water and wet lollies from Santa.

The annual New South Wales Rural Fire Service Open Day each September allows the Bargo community to see the big red trucks up close and personal. The Bargo community comes out to this event and with a sausage sizzle in hand, a great day is had by all each year.

With the annual Goulburn to Sydney Cycle race passing through Bargo every September, Bargo Rural Fire Brigade comes out to cheer among local spectators as the charity and competitor cyclists barrel through the town.
