= Ebony and Ivory (disambiguation) =

"Ebony and Ivory" is a single by Paul McCartney and Stevie Wonder.

Ebony and Ivory may also refer to:

- Ebony and Ivory (piano duo)
- Ebony and Ivory (Devil May Cry), fictional weapons
- "Ebony and Ivory", an episode of Roc
- "Ebony and Ivory", an episode of The Jeffersons
- Ebony & Ivory (film), a 2024 comedy film
- The keys of a piano

== See also ==
- Ebony (disambiguation)
- Ivory (disambiguation)
