= James Ivory (disambiguation) =

James Ivory (born 1928) is an American director.

James Ivory may also refer to:

- James Ivory (watchmaker) (1729–1793), Scottish watchmaker
- James Ivory (mathematician) (1765–1842), Scottish mathematician
- James Ivory, Lord Ivory (1792–1866), Scottish judge
