= Bargo railway viaduct =

Bargo Railway Viaduct
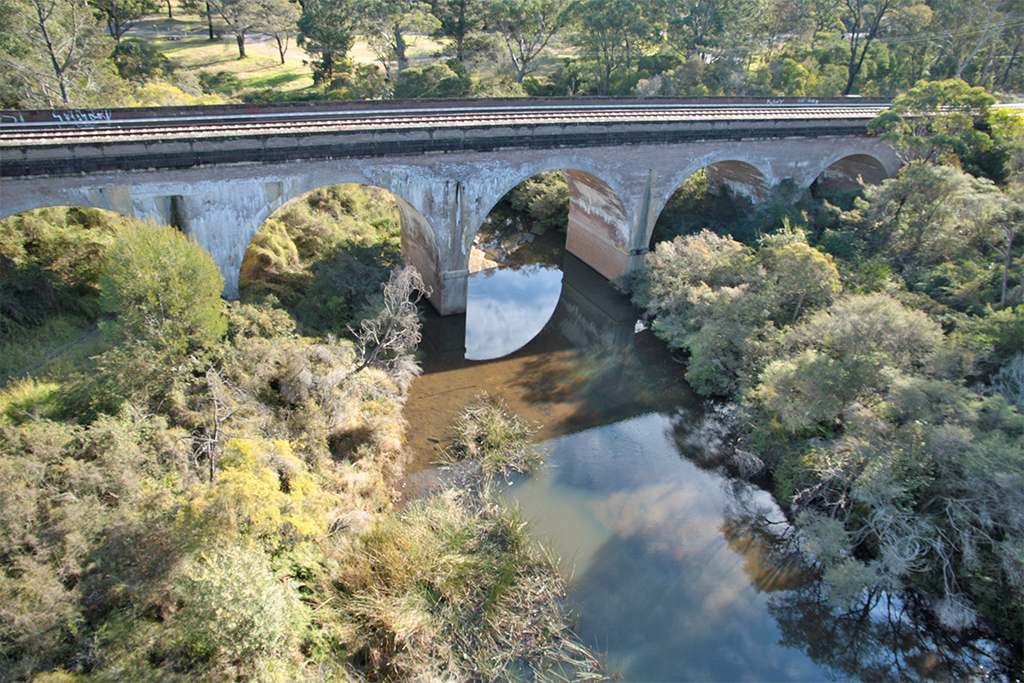
- The Bargo railway viaduct, pictured in 2010
- Coordinates: 34°14′12″S 150°34′48″E
- Carries: Main Southern railway
- Crosses: Bargo River
- Locale: Bargo, Wollondilly Shire, New South Wales, Australia
- Owner: Transport Asset Manager of New South Wales

Characteristics
- Design: Arch viaduct
- Material: Brick
- Total length: 76 metres (249 ft)
- Longest span: 15.2 metres (50 ft)

Rail characteristics
- No. of tracks: 2
- Track gauge: 1,435 mm (4 ft 8 1/2 in)

History
- Contracted lead designer: New South Wales Government Railways
- Construction end: 1919

New South Wales Heritage Register
- Official name: Bargo Railway Viaduct; Bargo River Railway Viaduct
- Type: State heritage (built)
- Designated: 2 April 1999
- Reference no.: 1024
- Type: Railway Bridge/Viaduct
- Category: Transport – Rail

Location
- Interactive map of Bargo Railway Viaduct

The Bargo Railway Viaduct is a heritage-listed railway viaduct over the Bargo River. It is located on the Main South railway approximately 96 kilometres (60 mi) from Central, in the town of Bargo, New South Wales. The viaduct was designed by New South Wales Government Railways and built in 1919. It is also known as Bargo River Railway Viaduct. The property is owned by Transport Asset Manager of New South Wales, an agency of the Government of New South Wales. It was added to the New South Wales State Heritage Register on 2 April 1999.

== History ==
By the early 1900s much of the original single track railways in New South Wales had become inadequate for railway operations, particularly the busy Main Lines (South, West and North) through the Great Dividing Range. Plans were made to duplicate the tracks and at the same time ease the original steep grades and sharp curves, usually all achieved by deviation works.

It was a major programme beginning in 1910 and continuing to 1923. The dominant bridge building material was bricks, mostly from the 1912 State Brickworks at Homebush and mostly in the form of brick arches. This was due to (a) a general lack of expensive imported steel and (b) a long-standing government policy to see local materials used as much as possible. Even for short spans, 6 to 9 metres (20 to 30 ft), where a simple steel plate web girder would have been the norm, brick arches were built.

The quantity of bricks used in the programme was enormous so the period 1910-23 could be aptly described as the "era of brick arch construction". Thereafter, locally produced steel, from Newcastle and Port Kembla, displaced the use of bricks for superstructures, but large quantities of bricks continued to be used for piers, abutments and wings walls.

In the duplication programme, that of the Main South was the largest. It had been duplicated to Picton by 1892, then from 1913 to 1922 duplication was extended to Cootamundra, a distance of 343 kilometres (213 mi), in sections but not always sequentially. For example, the 52 kilometres (32 mi) first section from Picton to Bowral was one of the last completed in 1919 whereas the 89 kilometres (55 mi) section, Bowral to Goulburn, had been completed in 1915.

A design policy of the duplication work was to eliminate level crossings, consequently there are as many underbridges and overbridges for roads as there are underbridges for waterways. Fast, safe, through running was to be the new standard for goods and passenger trains.

== Description ==
A large brick arch viaduct consisting of five 15.2-metre (50 ft) spans over the Bargo River.

=== Condition ===
As at 16 March 2006, the physical condition is good.

The bridge retains its original fabric and structure.

== Heritage listing ==
As at 16 March 2006, the bridge has significance because it is part of the major duplication of the Main South Railway, the use of brick construction complements the natural environment, the duplication work contributed significantly to the continued development of South Western New South Wales, commercially through freight trains and socially through faster, better passenger trains and in the "era of brick arch construction", 1910–23, there were around 90 railway sites where brick arches singly and in multiples, for clear spans from 6.1 to 13.1 metres (20 to 43 ft) were built. But this viaduct has a set of larger brick arches at 15.2-metre (50 ft) clear spans. The bridge retains its original fabric and structure.

Bargo Railway Viaduct was listed on the New South Wales State Heritage Register on 2 April 1999 having satisfied the following criteria.

The place is important in demonstrating the course, or pattern, of cultural or natural history in New South Wales.

The bridge is part of the major duplication of the Main South Railway.

The place is important in demonstrating aesthetic characteristics and/or a high degree of creative or technical achievement in New South Wales.

The bridge is readily accessible from the Old Hume Highway set in a natural environment.

The place has a strong or special association with a particular community or cultural group in New South Wales for social, cultural or spiritual reasons.

The duplication work contributed significantly to the continued development of South Western New South Wales, commercially through freight trains and socially through faster, better passenger trains.

The place has potential to yield information that will contribute to an understanding of the cultural or natural history of New South Wales.

In the "era of brick arch construction", 1910–23, there were around 90 railway sites where brick arches singly and in multiples, for clear spans from 6.1 to 13.1 metres (20 to 43 ft) were built. These structures depend on the bricklayers skills.

But this viaduct is one of only a few with larger clear spans of 15.2 metres (50 ft) or more.

The place is important in demonstrating the principal characteristics of a class of cultural or natural places/environments in New South Wales.

A representative example of brick arch construction.

== See also ==
- List of railway bridges in New South Wales
