= Ivory (disambiguation) =

Ivory is a substance found in the teeth and tusks of animals such as elephants.

Ivory may also refer to:

== People ==
- Ivory (name), notable people with this name.

== Places ==
- Ivory, Jura, a commune in the Jura department of France
- Ivory, Maryland, United States
- Ivory Park, Gauteng
- Port Ivory, Staten Island

== Music ==
- Ivory (Teena Marie album)
- Ivory (Gin Wigmore album)
- Ivory (Omar Apollo album), 2022
- "Ivory" (song), by Dragon Ash

== Other uses ==
- Ivory (color), an off-white color
  - RAL 1014 Ivory, a RAL color
- Ivory (soap), a personal care brand
- Ivory: A Legend of Past and Future a novel by Mike Resnick
- Ivory (CPU), a VLSI processor, especially for Lisp Microcode
- Ivory (mango), a mango cultivar
- Hornbill ivory, an ornamental material derived from a bird's bill
- Pink ivory, an African tree and the wood derived from it
- Ivory palm, a South American tree and the carvable tissue derived from it

== See also ==
- Ivory Coast, a country in Africa
- Ivory Tower (disambiguation)
