= Tahmoor, New South Wales =

Tahmoor
- Town
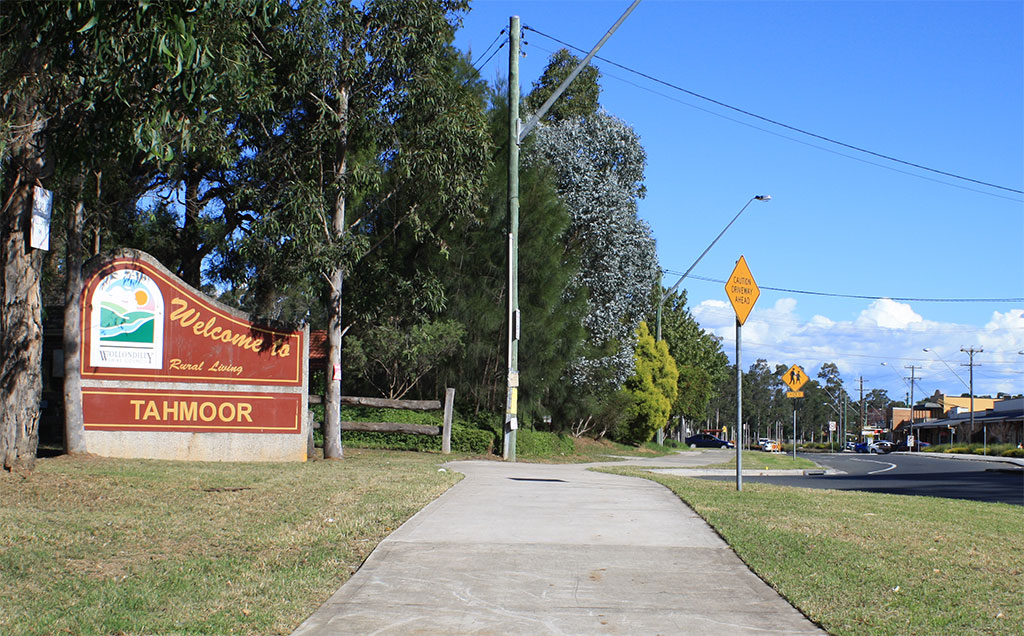
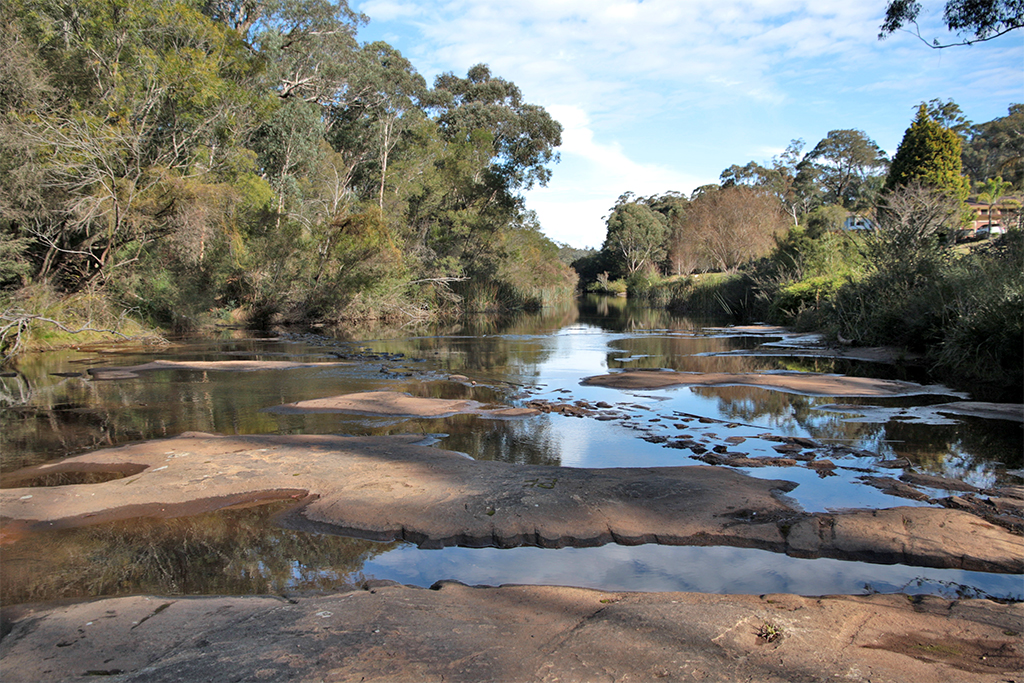
- Bargo River, original crossing place south of Tahmoor

- Coordinates: 34°13′27″S 150°35′32″E
- Country: Australia
- State: New South Wales
- Region: Macarthur
- LGA: Wollondilly Shire
- Location: 97 km (60 mi) SW of Sydney CBD; 31 km (19 mi) NE of Mittagong; 59 km (37 mi) NW of Wollongong

Government
  - State electorate: Wollondilly
  - Federal division: Hume
- Elevation: 275 m (902 ft)

Population
  - Total: 5,067 (2016 census)
- Postcode: 2573
Localities around Tahmoor
	Picton
Thirlmere	Tahmoor
Couridjah	Bargo	Pheasants Nest

Tahmoor is a small town in the Macarthur Region of New South Wales, Australia, in Wollondilly Shire.

== History ==
Originally named Myrtle Creek, it was a farming area on the Great Southern Road, later named the Hume Highway.

When the new Main Southern railway line opened in 1919, it included a railway station named Tahmoor. This name was contested by a local businessman, who wished to establish a town called Bronzewing Park, but his claim was rejected. The town had recently been named "Tahmoor", a local Aboriginal word for the common bronzewing, (Phaps chalcoptera) a native pigeon often seen in the area.

The Bargo River passes just south of the town; the Bargo River Crossing on the Great South Road was so notoriously difficult for travellers, causing many delays and accidents, (Note: 19th century graffiti cut into the stone bed of the river, perhaps by waiting travellers, can still be seen at this location.) that it has even passed into Australian folklore, in the form of the song Stringybark and Greenhide

'If you travel on the road, and chance to stick in Bargo,

To avoid a bad capsize, you must unload your cargo;
For to pull a dray about, I do not see the force on,

Take a bit of green hide, and hook another horse on.'

The uncleared scrub ('brush') on the opposite bank was known as the Bargo Brush, and was much feared as the haunt of escaped convicts turned bushranger. The road through the Bargo Brush was often all but impassible, as this letter of 1861 attests:

I have just travelled through the Bargo Brush, on the Great Southern Road, but such a road, I unhesitatingly say, never existed in any other civilised or uncivilised part of the world. Dr. Leichhardt met with nothing like it on his overland journey to Port Essington; nor did Bruce, in his travels in Abyssinia; nor did Mungo Park, or Dr. Livingstone, in their travels in the interior of Africa.

To give any thing like a graphic description of the state of the road would be impossible. For about twenty miles it is a succession of pits and bogs, and holes of every kind, and in order to prevent the escape of any of the unfortunate travellers into the bush, a ditch has been cut on both sides of the road, so that they are as well secured (although not so safe) as they would be on a treadmill. Every thing that nature and art could do to render a road impassable and dangerous, has been done on the Great Southern Road. Although I have had two days rest since I returned home, I still feel appalled at the dangers I have encountered, and most grateful to Providence for my preservation of both life and limb. My friend and I, who travelled together in a gig determined that we would spare no time or pains in exploring - so as to perform (what appeared to be a miracle) - the getting through this slough of pits and bogs, without breaking a bone of man or beast, or the shafts or springs of our gig. For this purpose one led the horse and the other walked ' before, to explore and take soundings of the pits, bogs, &c.

At times we were fairly brought to a stand-still, on account of the almost unfathomable holes, and the great number of drays, &c, deeply embedded in the slough. The poor carriers appeared to be at their wits' end. I have never seen such a fine set of strong, healthy fellows so dead beat as were the carriers on this road. And I shall never forget their kindness in assisting us in our difficulties. But for I them our horse and gig would have become a wreck on the Great Southern Road, and, probably, little more than the whip would have been visible to act as a beacon to warn travellers not to approach it. On, one occasion, when we had got deeply bogged, I asked a man, who was at the time hard at work with a spade digging his dray out of a bog, to come and as assist us. He immediately came, and also another man, with whose help we saved the life of our horse. Twice our horse got bogged up to the belly, notwithstanding the utmost precautions we could use, and on one occasion broke a shaft, which we had to splice in the best we could with the reins, some straps, and saplings. One of the mail-driven told us that one of his wheelers had sunk to the hips, and was I with difficulty drawn out by the remainder of the team. He said he had been twenty-two hours in coming thirty-two miles, and that nothing should induce him to continue driving by night on such a dangerous road.

Is not this a case for Government interference…? Thomas Holt, Camden Villa, Newtown.

In time, increasing numbers of orchardists and dairy farmers needed to send their produce more safely to local railheads. These factors all hastened the construction of a road bridge (1898) and diversion of the Main South Line from further westwards (1919), to pass through this area.

== Heritage listings ==
Tahmoor has a number of heritage-listed sites, including:

- Main Southern railway: Tahmoor railway station

== The town today ==
At the 2016 census, Tahmoor had a population of 5,067, including 227 (4.5%) indigenous persons and 4,074 (80.8%) Australian-born persons.

=== Commerce ===
As part of its town and community planning strategies, determined to make Tahmoor-Picton precincts the shopping 'hubs' and service centre for the Wollondilly Shire. The present town has three major supermarkets, two of which are located in separate shopping centres, one being the older original Tahmoor Shopping Village and the other in the newer Tahmoor Town Centre. In addition to these there are a variety of small businesses, an expanding medical and dental centre, along with two prominent fast-food outlets, some take-aways and restaurants. Tahmoor like Picton has a Chamber of Commerce which supports community based projects.

=== Education ===
Schools include Tahmoor Public School, catering for Kindergarten to year 6, with a special needs department for local children, and Wollondilly Anglican College, an independent school serving students from Kindergarten to Year 12. Secondary students also attend the nearby Picton High School and other schools in the region.

=== Industry, employment and transport ===
The Tahmoor Colliery, located to the south in North Bargo, is an important employer in the town and surrounding area, as is Ingham's Enterprises, who operate a poultry processing plant. The supermarkets and small retail businesses also provide considerable employment, especially for part-time and casual staff.

Tahmoor railway station is serviced by the Southern Highlands Line. Bus services are operated by a local coach line.

=== Community organisations ===
Tahmoor has sporting fields, a skate and BMX park, a community function centre owned by the Country Women's Association, and a Rural Fire Service. The original location of the Bushfire Brigade (as it was then known) was an old hay shed, which was donated to the brigade. Donations have helped the Brigade to upgrade its facilities to the present standard.

The official soccer team of Tahmoor is the Tahmoor Taipans which competes in the Macarthur District Soccer Football Association League. The team's home ground is Tahmoor Oval.

=== Religious organisations ===
Tahmoor has Catholic, Uniting, Seventh-day Adventist and Anglican churches. To the south of the town is the Kiah Ridge Conference Centre, operated by the Baptist Church.

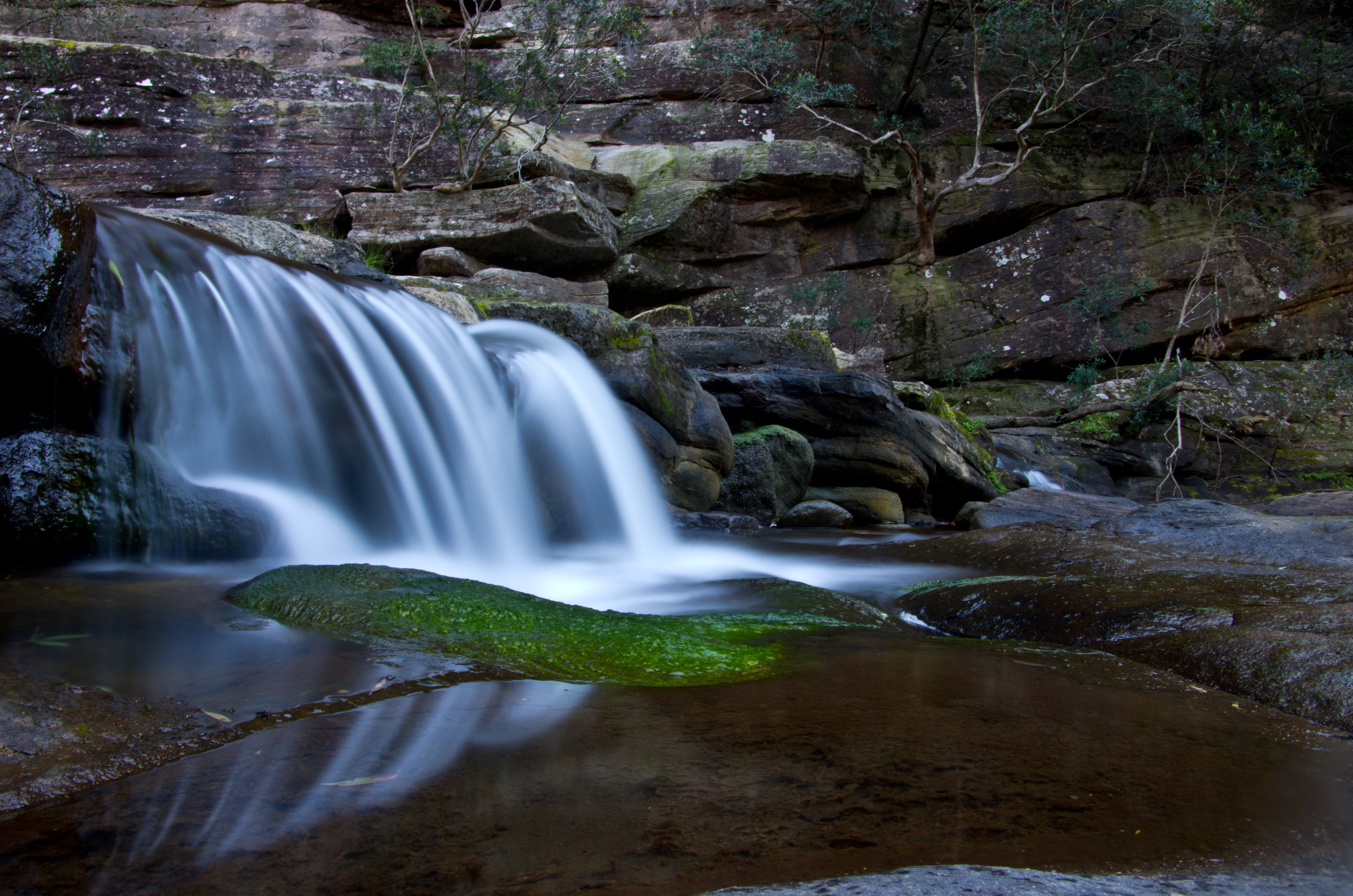
Rapids on the Bargo River.

=== Bushwalking ===
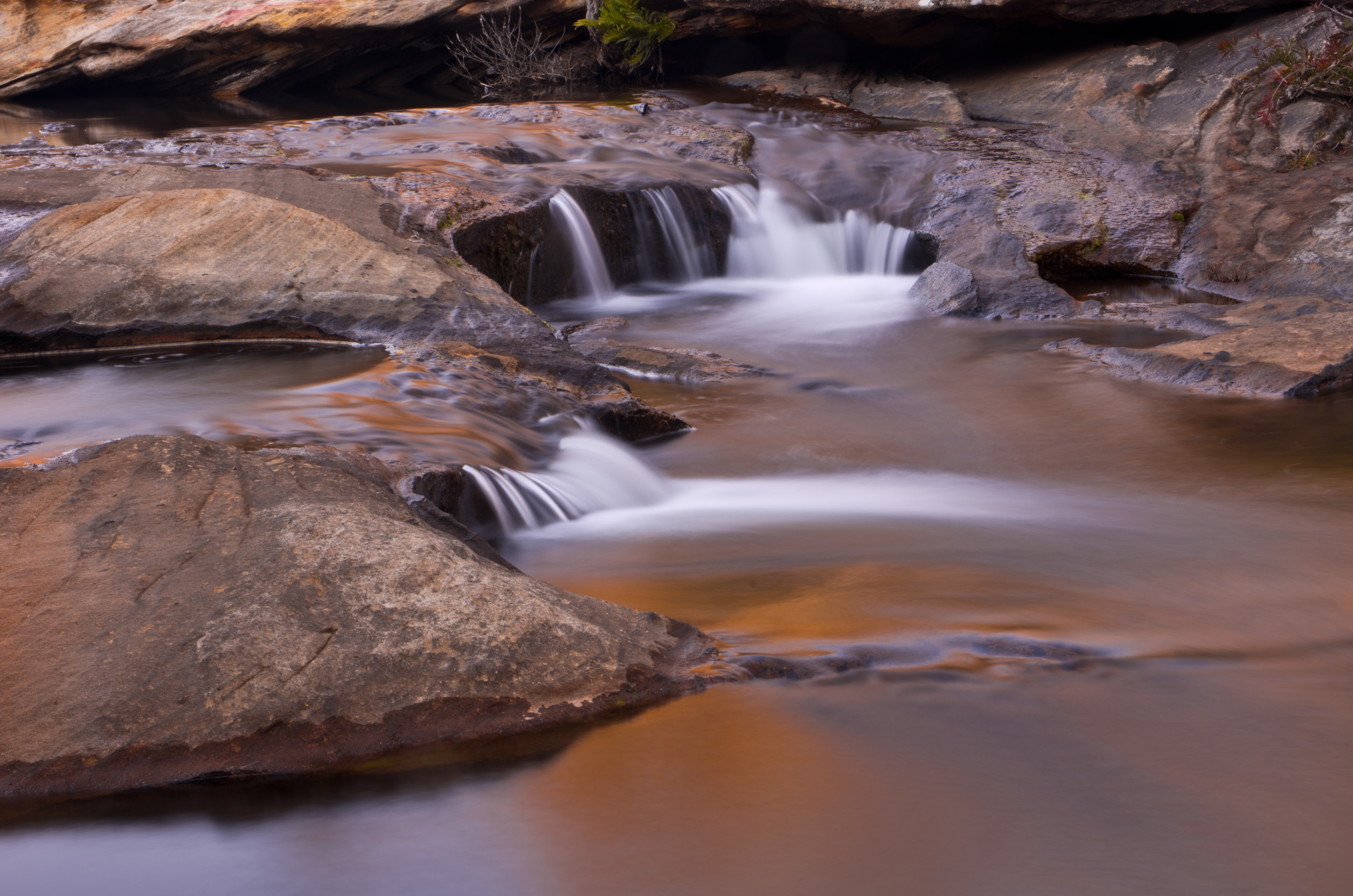
Potholes Reserve

There are bushwalking opportunities in the area with tracks that start from the Potholes Reserve. These lead to Potholes Reserve, Mermaid Pools, See Through Pools, Bargo Falls, Rapids on the Bargo River and Tahmoor Gorge. It is also possible to trek downstream to the Nepean River.

== Tahmoor gallery ==
Images of Tahmoor today

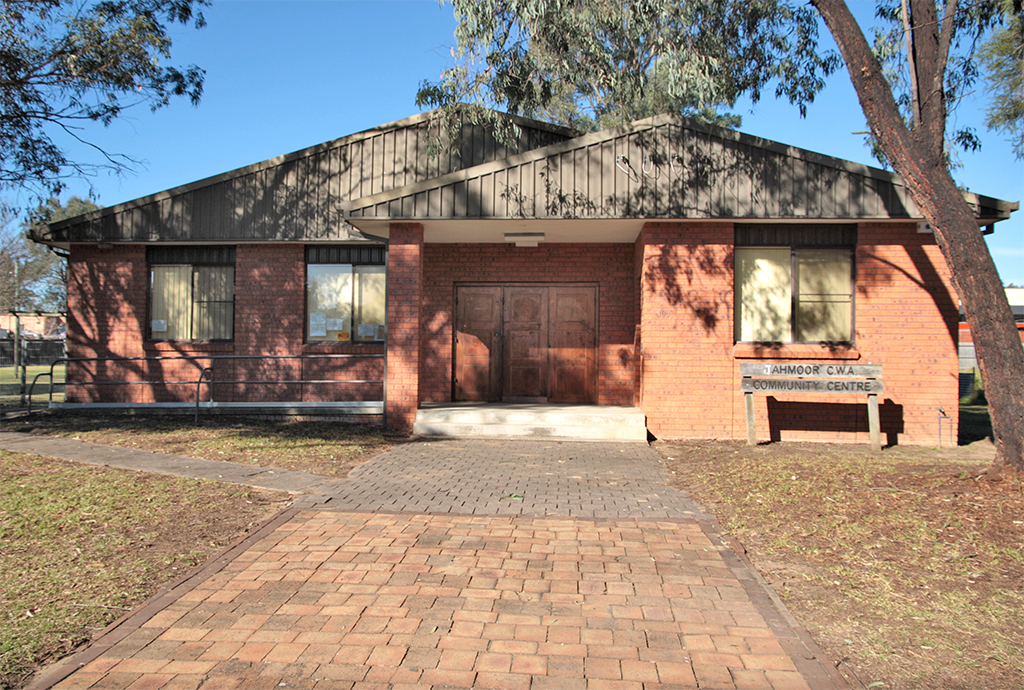
C. W. A. Community Hall

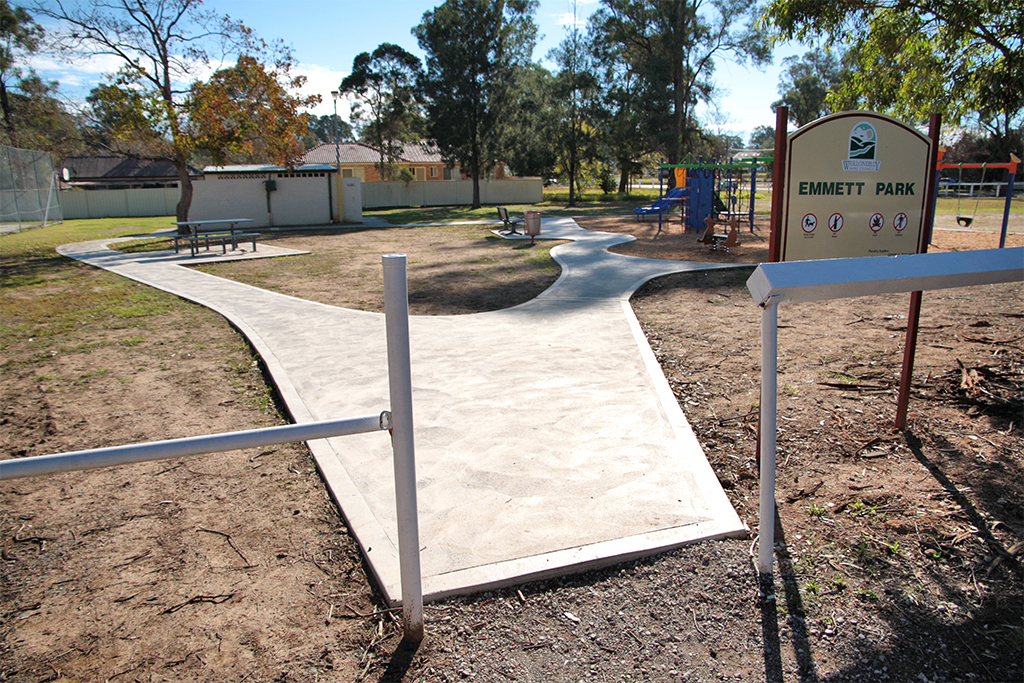
Emmett Park

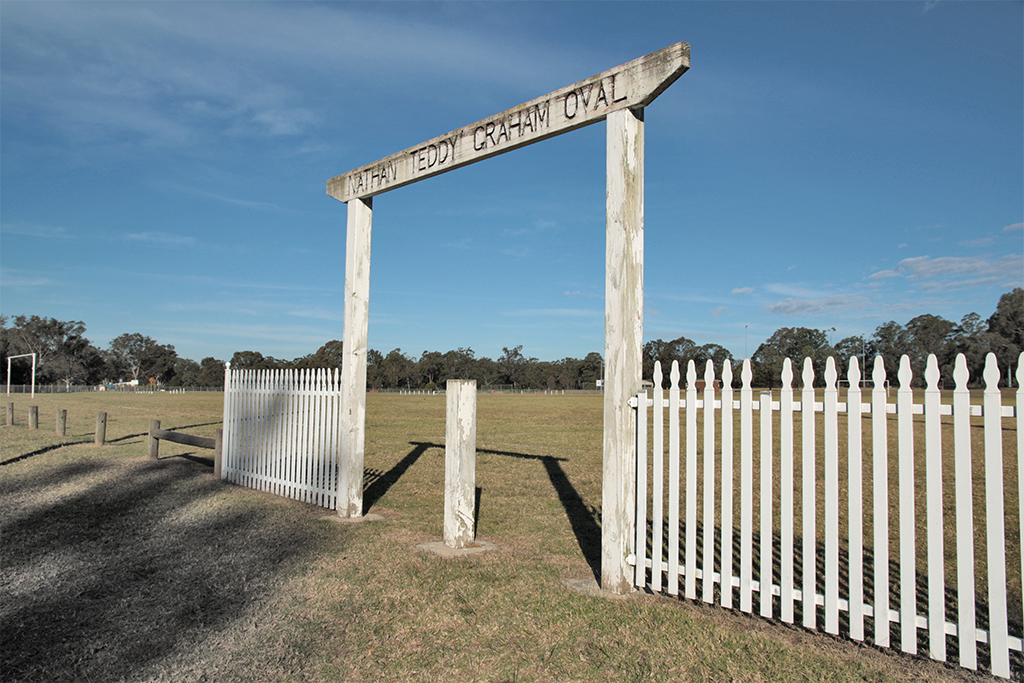
Tahmoor Sportsground

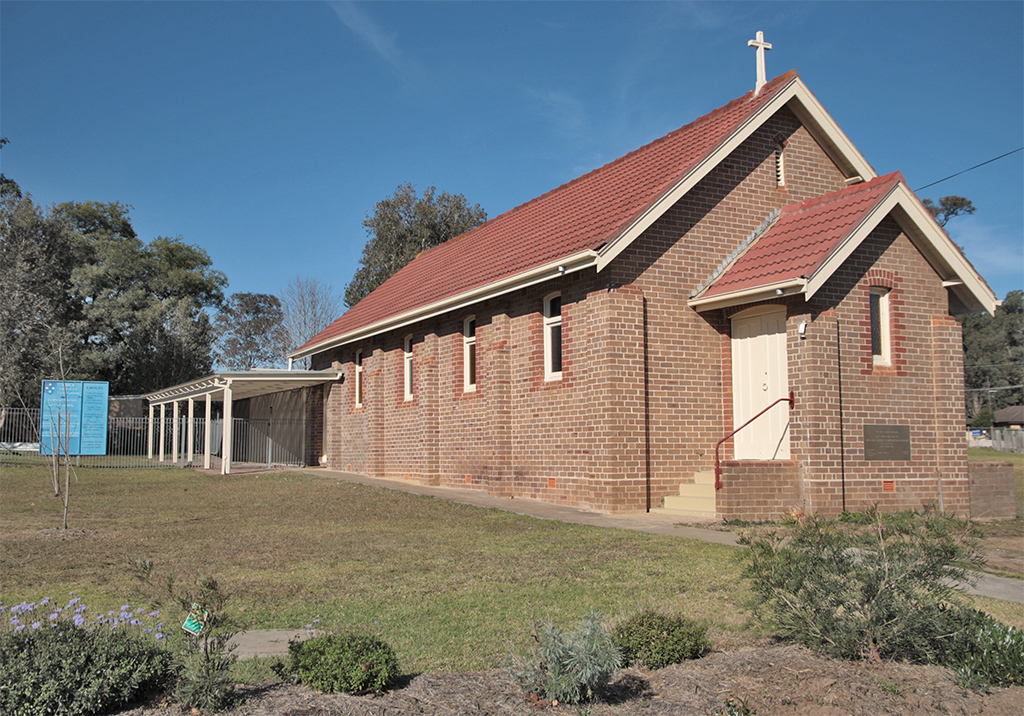
Holy Trinity Anglican Church

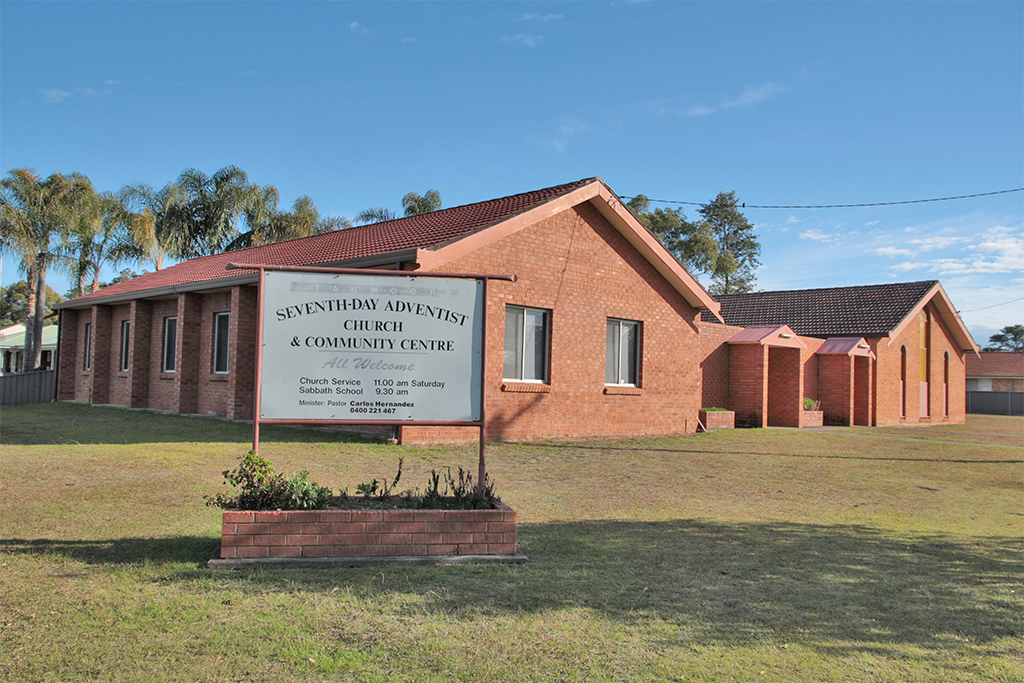
Seventh Day Adventist Church

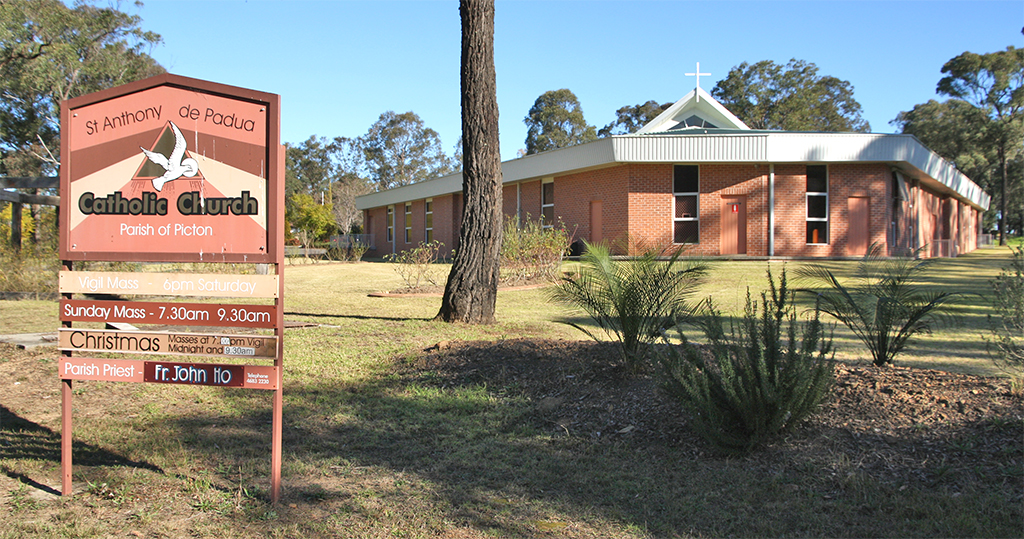
St Anthony's Catholic Church

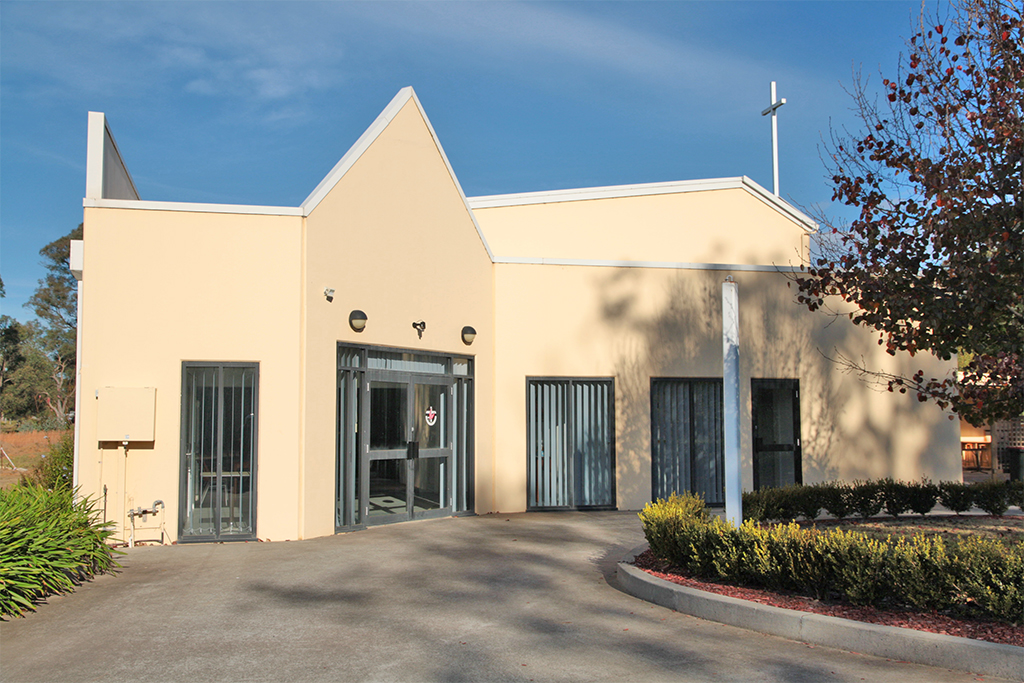
Uniting Church

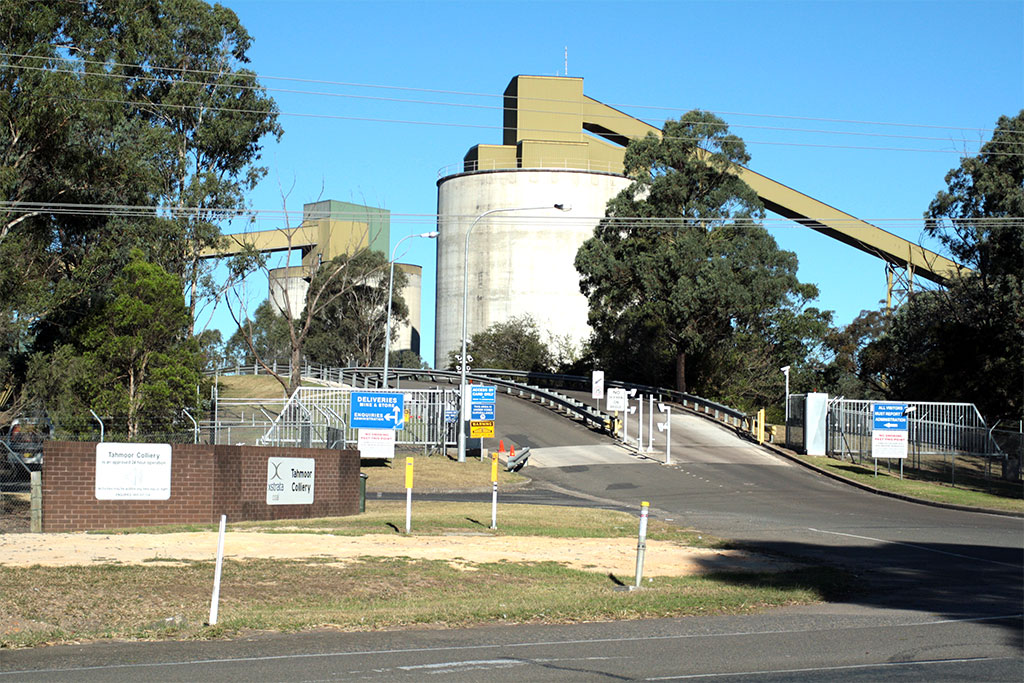
Tahmoor Colliery

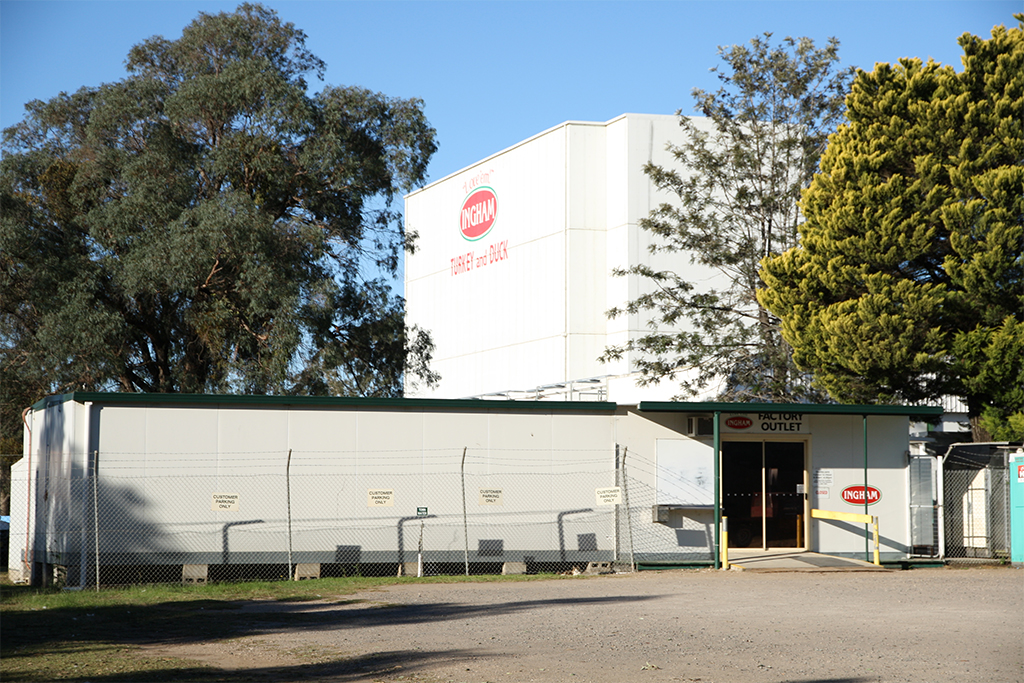
Inghams turkey and duck plant

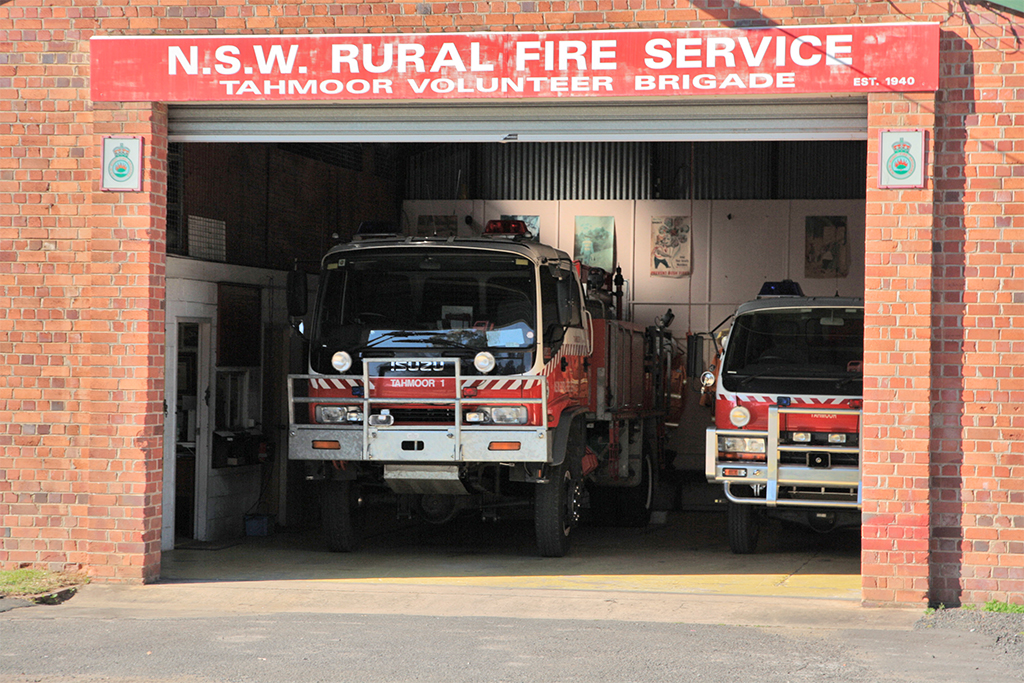
Rural Fire Service shed

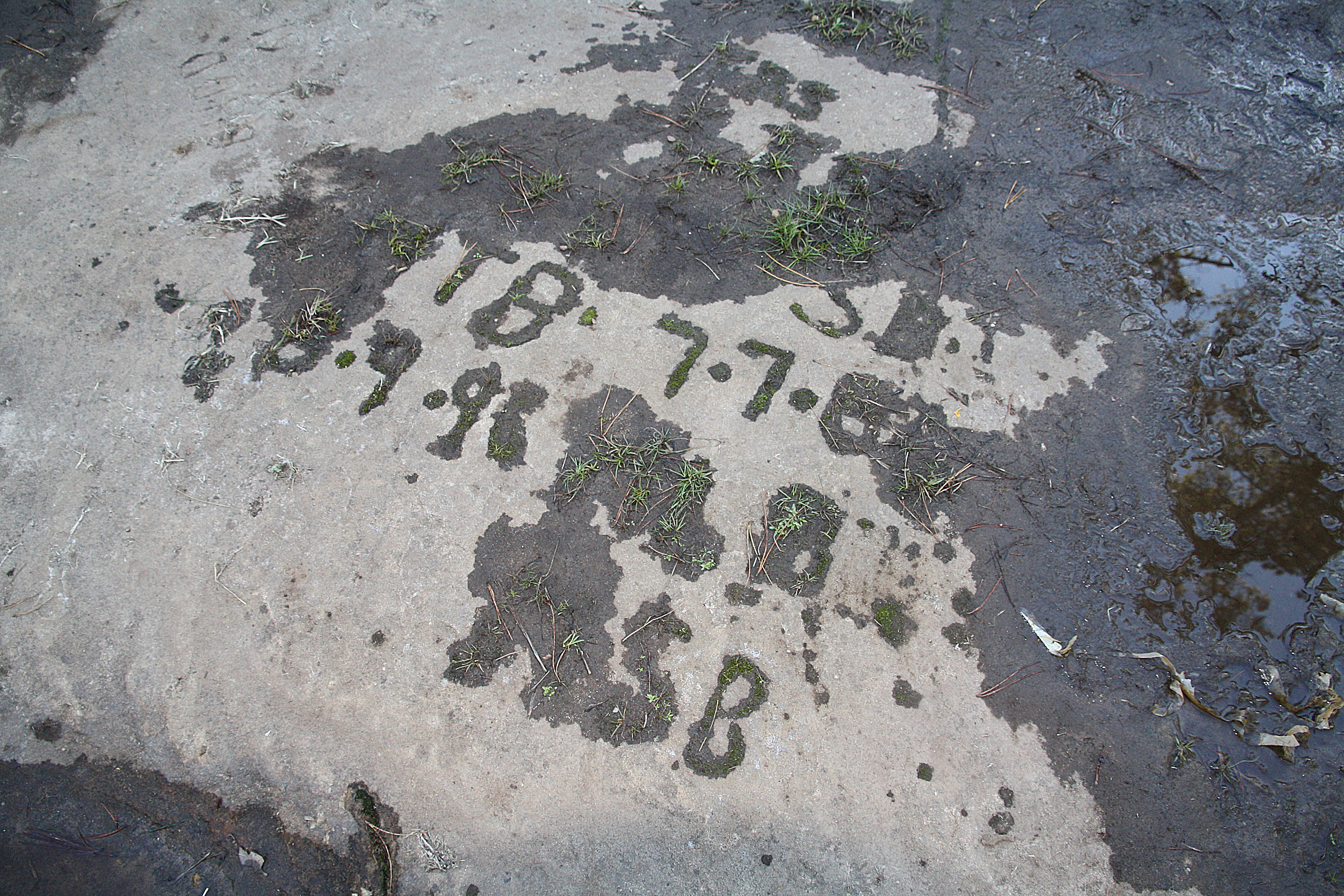
Rock-cut graffiti at Bargo River Crossing Place
