= Matthias Drawe =

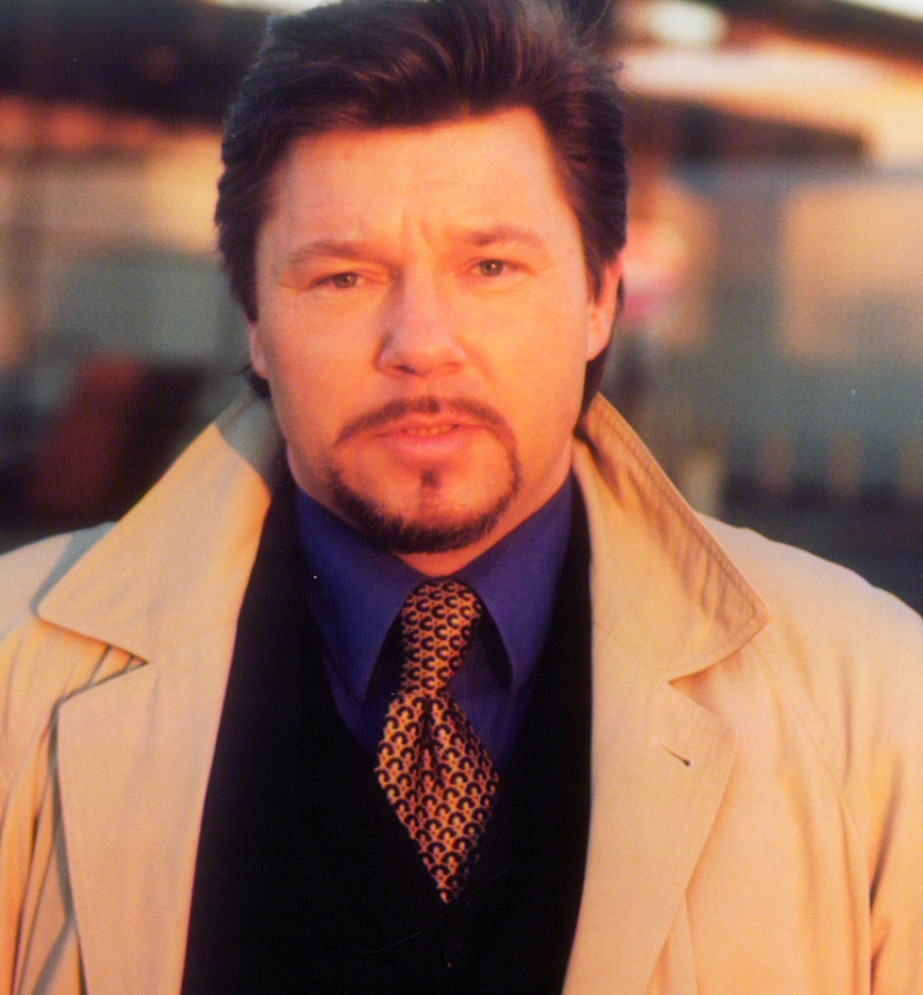
- Matthias Drawe in New York, 2012
- Born: 4 February 1963 (age 63); East Berlin, Germany
- Occupations: Filmmaker, writer, actor, journalist
- Years active: 1988–present

Matthias Drawe (born 4 February 1963 in East Berlin) is a German filmmaker, writer, actor and journalist.

== Life and work ==
Drawe grew up in a DEFA building at the border of Potsdam-Babelsberg and West Berlin. In 1970 he managed to defect to West Berlin together with his father, Hans Drawe, a former DEFA dramatist, and his mother in a spectacular escape. Risking their lives, they jumped over the Berlin Wall by using an unsecured film ladder.

At the beginning of the 1980s Drawe lived in a squatted house in Berlin-Kreuzberg, taking part in the fight for affordable housing, which provides the backdrop for his novel Wild Years in West Berlin.

In 1987, through a mutual friend, he met Turkish director Serif Gören who had directed the critically acclaimed Yol - The Path (1982) for the incarcerated Yilmaz Güney. Gören had chosen Berlin-Kreuzberg, which has a high concentration of Turkish immigrants, as the backdrop for his comedy Polizei (1988) starring Turkish actor Kemal Sunal. Gören cast Drawe as a small-time crook.

Inspired by Gören, Drawe took up filmmaking in 1988 shooting The Art of Being a Man (1989) on Russian black and white stock smuggled into West-Berlin from East Germany. In 1991 he founded Kellerkino a small art-house cinema in Berlin-Kreuzberg, which specialized in independent films and screened the early shorts of the then unknown Florian Henckel von Donnersmarck, who would later win an Oscar for The Lives of Others.

After having shot The King of Kreuzberg (1990) and The Ivory Tower (1992) in Berlin, Drawe moved to New York City and worked as a journalist for Deutschlandradio Kultur, the German equivalent of NPR. Drawe's radio features from around the world were brought to life by voice actor Christian Brückner, who provides the official German voice for Robert De Niro, thereby giving German listeners the impression that it was De Niro reporting.

== Filmography ==
- 1988: Polizei (actor), Director: Şerif Gören
- 1989: The Art of Being a Man (screenplay, director, actor)
- 1990: The King of Kreuzberg (screenplay, director, actor) - nominated for the de:Max Ophüls Preis (Max Ophüls Award)
- 1992: The Ivory Tower (screenplay, director, actor)
- 1994: Lutz & Hardy ZDF TV series with Karl Lieffen and Hans Korte
  (screenplays for pilot and first episode; together with Hans Drawe)

== Fiction ==
- 2014: Wild Years in West-Berlin, novel
- 2016: Free Lunch in New York City, novel

== Radio Journalism (selection) ==
- 2002: Tijuana's Fence - Cross-border Experiences in Mexico
- 2002: Kinga and Micky - Selling Shoes in Manhattan
- 2002: Marvelous Mumpies - Being Fat is Beautiful - in Jamaica
- 2003: Hope is my Reward - Stand-up Comedians in New York
- 2003: My Life is a Beach - Carnival Blues in Copacabana
- 2004: Merely Be Funny! - A Foreigner's Job Search in Tokyo
- 2004: Haiti 2004 - A Country in Turmoil
- 2005: Point Barrow Alaska - The northernmost Point in the USA
