= Der König von Kreuzberg =

- Directed by: Matthias Drawe
- Written by: Matthias Drawe
- Produced by: Muavin Film Berlin
- Starring: Rasit Tuncay; Kerstin Rehberg; Mersehdeh Tschnadarabi
- Cinematography: Thorsten Schneider
- Edited by: Matthias Drawe
- Music by: Jan Tilman Schade; Rainer Vierkötter
- Distributed by: Muavin Film Berlin
- Release date: November 12, 1990
- Running time: 81 minutes
- Country: Germany
- Language: German (international distribution: English)

The King of Kreuzberg (German: Der König von Kreuzberg) is a 1990 German film by Matthias Drawe set in Berlin-Kreuzberg, a district of Berlin that has one of the largest concentration of Turks outside Turkey.

== Plot summary ==
The young Turk R. (Rasit Tuncay), who lives in Berlin-Kreuzberg, believes that he can rise from the ground by mere concentration. Initially he briefly succeeds in a public park, but unfortunately, no one has seen it.

Being sure of his special powers, he tries it again, even in the most unsuitable situations: He assumes his take-off position, standing on one leg, arms outstretched wide. This strange pose eventually gets him into trouble with almost everyone including his girlfriend — who kicks him out.

As a consequence, R. sleeps on a park bench, his meager belongings in a suitcase. Still, he tries to rise whenever he feels the urge — which lands him in an insane asylum. His only remaining friend M. (Matthias Drawe) eventually gets him out.

Subsequently, R. and his sidekick M. try to raise funds through questionable endeavors by using a "magical ATM card" and fixing a horse race at the race track. Unfortunately, with meager success and the cops at their heels.

Eventually R., renounces his "special powers," returns to bourgeois life, and marries his girlfriend. But the next morning the infallible urge is there again, stronger than ever: R. rushes into the open and assumes his take-off position ...

== Cast ==
Rasit Tuncay as R.
Kerstin Rehberg as L.
Matthias Drawe as M.
Mersedeh Tschandarabi as C.
Olmo Pini as the child
Simone Spörl as girl at bar
Fehim as the doctor
Ahmet Karabolut as hairdresser
Tanju Bilgin as the psychiatrist
Sehri Yavuz as the nurse
Al Hassan Wade as the quack

== Awards ==
The King of Kreuzberg was nominated for the 1991 de:Filmfestival Max Ophüls Preis (Max Ophüls Award)
