= Pheasants Nest, New South Wales =

Pheasants Nest
- Town
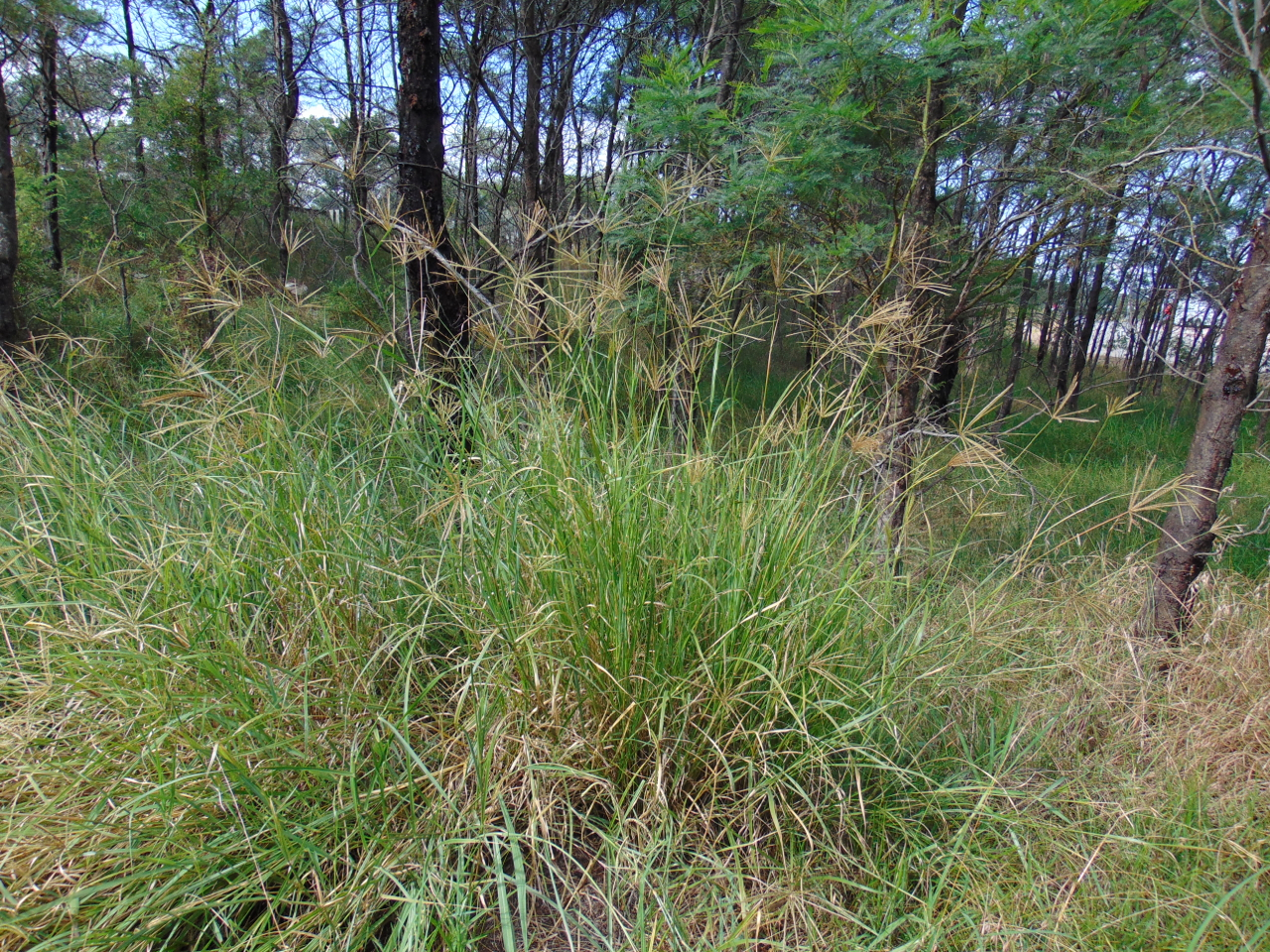
- Scrub near Peasants Nest

- Coordinates: 34°15′21″S 150°38′08″E
- Country: Australia
- State: New South Wales
- Region: Macarthur
- LGA: Wollondilly Shire
- Location: 101 km (63 mi) SW of Sydney CBD; 32 km (20 mi) NE of Mittagong; 57 km (35 mi) WNW of Wollongong

Government
  - State electorate: Wollondilly
  - Federal division: Hume
- Elevation: 292 m (958 ft)

Population
  - Total: 716 (SAL 2021)
- Postcode: 2574
Localities around Pheasants Nest
Tahmoor	Maldon	Wilton
Tahmoor	Pheasants Nest	Wilton
Bargo	Yanderra

Pheasants Nest is a small village in the Macarthur Region of New South Wales, Australia, near Bargo in Wollondilly Shire.

== History ==
The area was inhabited by the Dharawal and Gundungurra peoples for tens of thousands of years.

White settlers first recorded sightings of the koala, lyrebird, and wombat in the area, with ex-convict John Wilson describing the lyrebird as a pheasant, and this is the mostly likely origin of the name.

== Description ==
Pheasants Nest has a northbound and southbound roadhouse on the Hume Highway, and also serves as a freeway exit between Picton and Yerrinbool.

At the 2021 census, Pheasants Nest had a population of 716 people.

The Pheasants Nest Rural Fire Brigade consists of a two-way bin station. Housed in the station is the brigade's Cat 1 Tanker, code name Pheasants Nest 1 and the brigade's Cat 9 vehicle, code name Pheasants Nest 9.

== In popular culture ==
Journalist Louise Milligan's debut novel, a crime fiction thriller published in March 2024, is named after the town. It refers in particular to a notorious suicide spot, Pheasants Nest bridge, which crosses the Nepean River on the Hume Highway.
