= Ivory Tower (disambiguation) =

Ivory tower refers to a world or atmosphere where intellectuals engage in pursuits that are disconnected from the practical concerns of everyday life.

Ivory Tower or The Ivory Tower may also refer to:

- Ivory Tower (Antarctica), a peak in Antarctica
- The Ivory Tower, an unfinished novel by Henry James

== Films and entertainment ==
- The Ivory Tower (1993 film), a 1993 German film directed by Matthias Drawe
- Ivory Tower (1998 film), a 1998 American drama
- Ivory Tower (2010 film), a 2010 Canadian independent film co-written by Gonzales and Céline Sciamma
- Ivory Tower (2014 film), a 2014 American documentary film
- "The Ivory Tower" (Boardwalk Empire)
- Ivory Tower (Harvard Undergraduate Television), a long-running college soap opera
- Ivory Tower (company), a French video game developer

== Music ==
- "Ivory Tower" (1956 song), a popular song written by Jack Fulton and Lois Steele
- "Ivory Tower", the B-side to the title song "The NeverEnding Story" from the film
- "Ivory Tower" (Van Morrison song), 1986
- "Ivory Tower" (Anna Abreu song), 2007
- The Ivory Tower (album), an album by Takota
- "Ivory Tower", a song from the 2003 album Ghost of a Rose by Blackmore's Night
- "Ivory Tower", a song from the 2017 album A Fever Dream by Everything Everything
