= Ivory Winston =

African-American singer

- Born: Ivory Green; August 11, 1911
- Died: August 6, 1996 (aged 84)
- Occupation: Singer

Ivory Winston (August 11, 1911 – August 6, 1996) was an African-American singer. She sang for President Harry S. Truman, Governor William S. Beardsley, and others. She was named "Iowa's First Lady of Song."

== Career ==
Winston's recital debut was in May 1946 at Ottumwa Heights College. She sang at Harry S. Truman's birthday, during his presidential campaign throughout the Midwestern United States. At Drake University in June 1950, Winston had one of the top rankings at a music festival that was hosted by The Des Moines Register. She sang her song in July 1950 at a Republican Convention in Des Moines, in which she performed for Iowa Republicans and Governor William S. Beardsley. Winston won at the Iowa Greater Talent Search and won a radio competition that was aired nationally. She was a coloratura soprano. She was named "Iowa's First Lady of Song". When her children grew up, her daughter played the violin for her while her son played the cello. Despite her success, Winston and her family faced racism while moving to a different Ottumwa neighborhood due to a petition against them moving.

Winston died on August 6, 1996, without being able to perform professionally. There were some recordings of her music at one point, but they have been lost according to her family. The African American Museum of Iowa holds photographs of Winston, including her in a 1951 performance, and the University of Iowa holds papers relating to her career.

== Early life ==
Winston was born in Iowa to Effie and Reverend E. P. Green in 1911 as part of a Baptist household. Winston had no siblings and moved between pastorates as a teenager while studying to become a concert pianist. Attending church helped Ivory improve her singing, and she moved to Ottumwa, Iowa, when her father became a pastor of the Second Baptist Church. Winston attended Drake University to study music and languages, while also attending Ottumwa Heights College as a music student. Winston also studied at Parsons College. She married Clyde Melvin Winston, who worked at John Morrell, in 1936. She might have met her husband at the Second Baptist Church, where they both attended. They had two children, Berta Lou and Byron. Winston was able to train her voice as a housewife by singing while working.

== Death ==
Winston died on August 6, 1996; 5 days before her 85th birthday. She was unable to record professionally.
