= James Ivory (watchmaker) =

Scottish watchmaker, clockmaker, and engraver (1729 – 1793)

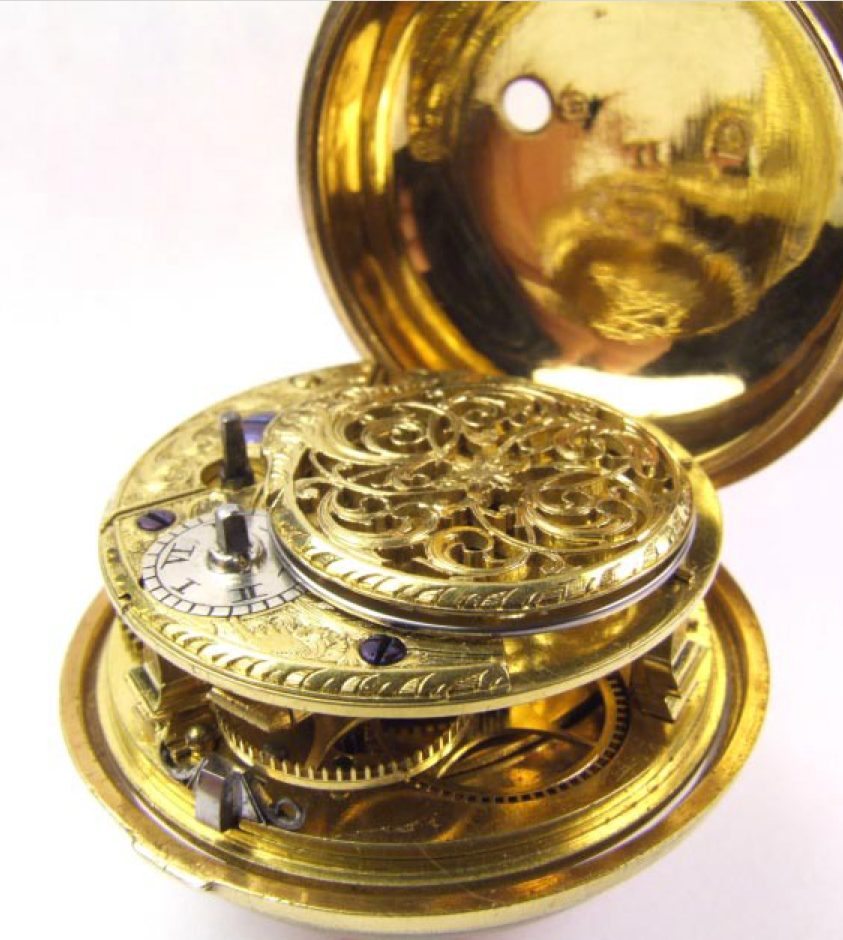
- James Ivory pocket watch #109
- Born: 1729; Edinburgh, Scotland
- Died: 1793 (aged 63–64); Dundee, Scotland
- Scientific career
- Fields: Watchmaker

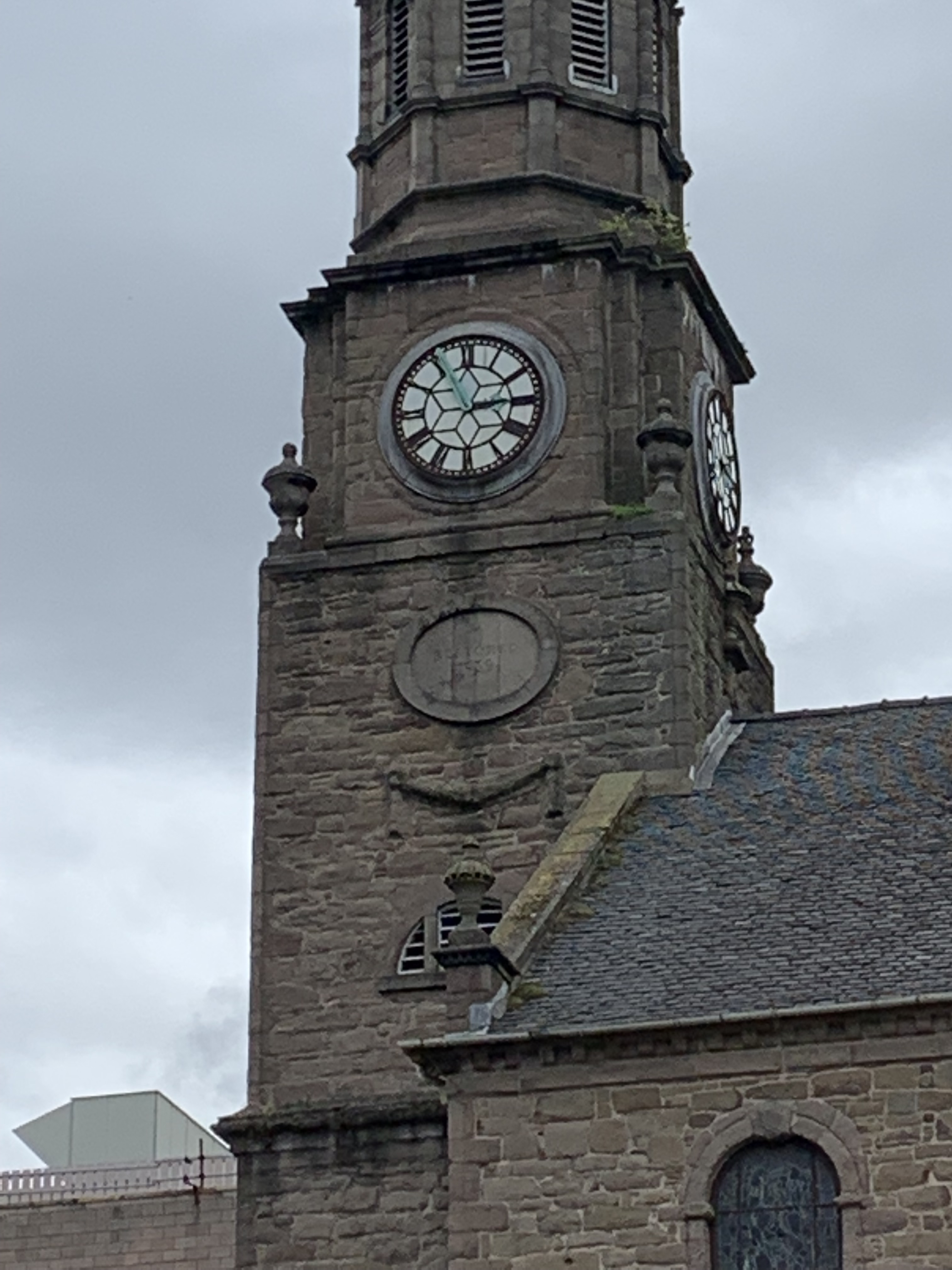
1774 - St Andrew's Parish Church - Dundee

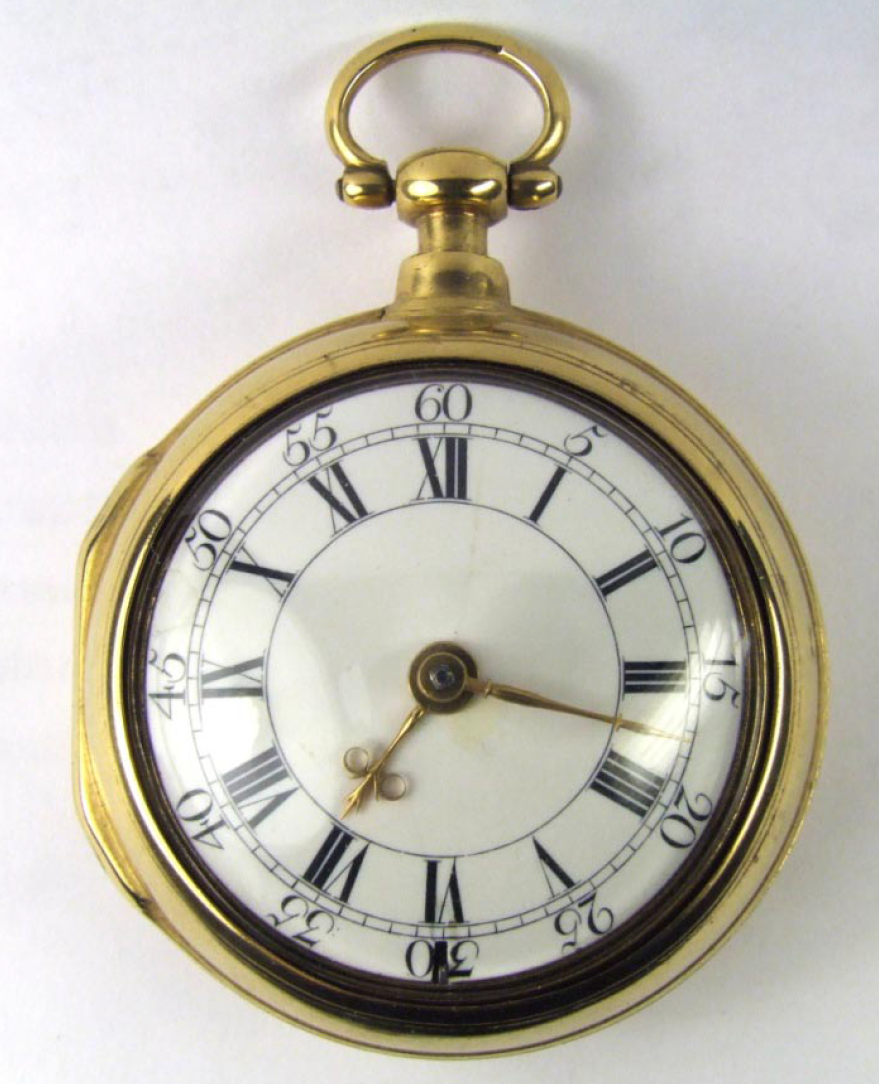
James Ivory pocket watch #109

James Ivory (1729 – 1793) was a Scottish watchmaker, clockmaker, and engraver. He was briefly followed by his son Thomas Ivory.

== Biography ==
James Ivory was a very prominent watchmaker and clockmaker in Dundee, Scotland during the mid-to-late 18th century. Born in Liberton, near Edinburgh in 1729, he worked as an apprentice in London, England (years unknown). There he married Jane Brown on 27 January 1761 at St. Clement Danes Church in London. In late 1762 he returned to Scotland to work in Dundee, where he lived until his death in 1793. On 17 February 1765 his first son Sir James Ivory was born in Dundee. His wife Jane however died shortly after child birth. He went on to marry Margaret Cook on 16 September 1768. James Ivory had 3 sons and 2 daughters through his two marriages including his stepchildren. James's second son Thomas who was born on 5 April 1770, followed after his father and became a watchmaker in 1795 in his own right after apprenticing under his father. He later gave up the trade in 1800 to work in publishing until his death in 1825. Thomas in turn named his son James who later become known as Lord Ivory.

James Ivory rose to considerable eminence as a renowned clockmaker in Dundee and throughout the United Kingdom. He was entrusted with the making of the clock for the steeple of St. Andrew's Parish Church in the Cowgate area of Dundee in 1774 which is still in use today. He also served as a Dundee Town Councillor from 1768 until 1789. It was while acting in this capacity that his eldest son, mathematician Sir James Ivory, was appointed one of the teachers at the Dundee Academy.

After completing his apprenticeship in London, he opened a workshop there prior to moving to Dundee after marriage. His extremely rare early pieces thus have "London" engraved onto them rather than "Dundee". During his time as an active clockmaker and watchmaker between the mid 1750s and 1793, he made pocket watches, hall clocks, wall clocks, etc., many of which were of the verge fusee escapement type of movement. Most of his pocket watches would have had "beetle and poker"-style hands, white enamel faces, and baluster-style pillars. Many of his pieces have been sold at auction for tens of thousands of dollars and are regarded as "the best that money could buy in London at the time" by auction houses even today.

== Output ==
Based upon engraved serial numbers on his pocket watch movements from 1759 through 1768, he produced an estimated average of 20 watches a year during that time. Between 1769 and 1774 that number increased to an average of 78. By comparison, others were putting out hundreds, sometimes thousands, of movements per year from their workshops. This just goes to show that much of the work was in fact done by him personally rather than with the help of several apprentices like many other makers of the time. Being an engraver himself, he created most if not all of the work on his movements vs. sourcing finished parts from other suppliers as was common practice by others. Most of the components were ordered unfinished, which was every makers practice, then finished by the makers shop. By and large, most other makers whose signatures were engraved on their movements, may not even have touched it themselves at all and apprentices performed most of the remaining engraving, finishing, and assembly. Ivory's only known apprentice was his son, Thomas, at only the last few years of his life.

His works of craftsmanship are highly sought after by collectors, most especially his first works from the early 1760s. The extensively intricate engravings and ornamentation on his movements are very finely detailed and elegant in design. During the time of his career, most other watchmakers were reducing the amount of aesthetic detailing put into the decorations and engravings on their movements. Most of this was due in part to the introduction of dust covers being used on pocket watch movements in the late 18th century. James himself is known to have begun using dust covers on his movements in 1774. Pocket watch movements by most other makers which utilized dust covers and newer types of escapements (such as duplex escapements in the UK which had been patented in 1782 and were in wide use by 1790) simply lacked the same artistic adornment for which the movements of the prior 100 years had become so well-known and sought after. The works of James Ivory carried on the grand style of this tradition up until the end of his life in 1793.
