= The Ivory Tower (1992 film) =

- Directed by: Matthias Drawe
- Written by: Matthias Drawe
- Produced by: Muavin Film Berlin
- Starring: Matthias Drawe; Maren Lass; Rasit Tuncay
- Cinematography: Thorsten Schneider
- Edited by: Matthias Drawe
- Music by: de:Tilman Schade; Rainer Vierkötter
- Distributed by: Muavin Film Berlin
- Release date: February 1992
- Running time: 80 minutes
- Country: Germany
- Language: German (international distribution: English)

The Ivory Tower (German: Der Elfenbeinturm) is a 1992 German film by Matthias Drawe set in Berlin and the surrounding forests of Brandenburg.

== Plot ==
M. works as a cook in a busy Berlin restaurant. Barely past thirty, he suffers a mild heart attack, which gives him the scare of his life. He decides to turn his life around and write the great novel that he always felt inside him. He packs a little bundle, puts on his feathered hat and ventures into the woods of Brandenburg. When he discovers an abandoned water tower, he immediately knows that this is his Ivory Tower. However, after a few promising pages into his novel, M. experiences a severe case of writer's block. He tries several classic home remedies: a good bottle of Whiskey and a cigar, Kneipp style water treading in an ice-cold creek and balancing an egg on his head while standing on a steep ladder — unfortunately, all to no avail.

To make matters worse: He is far from alone in his retreat. First, he runs into a whacky birdwatcher; second, he discovers a domesticated rabbit that has been abandoned in the wild; and third, there is an enticing country girl collecting wild berries. In addition, his best friend, the waiter R., has given away M's location to his city friends who suddenly show up to throw a party. Realizing that his novel might not been ripe, yet, M. decides to return to the city on a bike. Passing his Ivory Tower for one last time, the country girl walks out of the woodwork and hops on his bike.

== Cast ==
- Matthias Drawe as Cook M.
- Maren Lass as Country girl L.
- Rasit Tuncay as Waiter R.
- Frank Lucas as the Birdwatcher
- Irma Handwerker as Party guest no. 1
- Thornton Jacobs as Party guest no. 2
- Gisela Marks as Party guest no. 3
- K.D. Krause as Party guest no. 4
