= Murder of Ebony Simpson =

1992 homicide in New South Wales, Australia

- Ebony Simpson
- Date: 19 August 1992
- Location: Bargo, New South Wales, Australia
- Type: Murder
- Cause: Abduction, rape and asphyxiation, caused by drowning
- Deaths: Ebony Jane Simpson (aged 9 years)
- Convicted: Andrew Peter Garforth
- Convictions: Murder
- Sentence: Life imprisonment; no possibility of parole

The murder of Ebony Jane Simpson (born 22 December 1982) occurred on 19 August 1992 in Bargo, New South Wales, Australia. Aged nine years, Simpson was abducted, raped, and murdered by asphyxiation when Andrew Peter Garforth (born 5 August 1963) drowned her. Garforth pleaded guilty to the crimes and was sentenced to life imprisonment without the possibility of parole.

== Abduction and murder ==
On 19 August 1992, Simpson disembarked from her school bus. Her mother, who usually met her at the bus stop, was busy that day and had arranged for Simpson's older brother to meet her and accompany her home, after his bus reached the stop. Unfortunately his bus arrived later than usual and Simpson was not there. Simpson, not seeing her brother at the bus stop, decided to start walking home as it was only a short distance away. Simpson thought that she would meet her brother at home.

Police soon suspected that Ebony had been kidnapped rather than running away. Suspicion fell on a man who was seen working on his car near where she had disembarked from the bus. Over a hundred people began searching the area for Ebony, including police, firefighters, State Emergency Service members, and volunteers.

Two days later, on the 21st of August, police found Ebony's body in a dam at a wildlife sanctuary near her home. Her hands and feet were bound. Later that day, 29 year old Andrew Peter Garforth was arrested and confessed to the murder. With her house in sight, Garforth had grabbed Simpson, thrown her in the boot of his car and driven off to a remote dam. Once there, he bound her with wire, raped her, weighted her schoolbag and threw her into the dam's reservoir, where she drowned. According to police, Garforth had participated in the search for Simpson on the day her body was found.

== Arrest ==
Garforth confessed to the crime after police detained him, showing no remorse for his actions during the confession and court sessions. He pleaded guilty to the murder of Simpson and was sentenced in 1993 to life imprisonment. Justice Peter Newman refused to fix a non-parole period and ordered that Garforth's papers be marked "never to be released".

Garforth appealed to the High Court of Australia, but he was refused special leave. It is one of two similar cases which were refused special leave. In discussing the meaning of "life imprisonment" when Garforth appealed his sentence the Judges said, "the community interest in retribution, deterrence, protection of children and the community in such situations may so strongly outweigh any regard for rehabilitation that a life sentence becomes the only option."

In 1995, Garforth lodged several claims for victims' compensation via his lawyers, relating to alleged assaults which occurred in prison. The claims were later withdrawn after public outrage. Garforth's prisoner status was downgraded upon the recommendation of the Serious Offenders Review Council in 2015, giving him access to prison employment and rehabilitation courses. The council's decision was immediately reversed by Minister for Corrections David Elliott.

== Aftermath ==
Simpson's parents, Christine and Peter Simpson, joined forces with Grace and Garry Lynch, the parents of New South Wales 1986 murder victim Anita Cobby, to create the Homicide Victims Support Group. The group provides support to the families of murder victims and lobbies for victims' rights.

Following the 1988 state election, the NSW Government introduced legislation in 1989 and 1990 broadly aimed at truth in sentencing. Garforth's case was often cited as a test case for the application of the principle of life sentencing and security classification.

== See also ==
- Lists of solved missing person cases
- Murder of Janine Balding
- Murder of Lauren Barry & Nichole Collins
- Murder of Virginia Morse
- Murder of Sian Kingi
