= Bargo, New South Wales =

Bargo
- Town
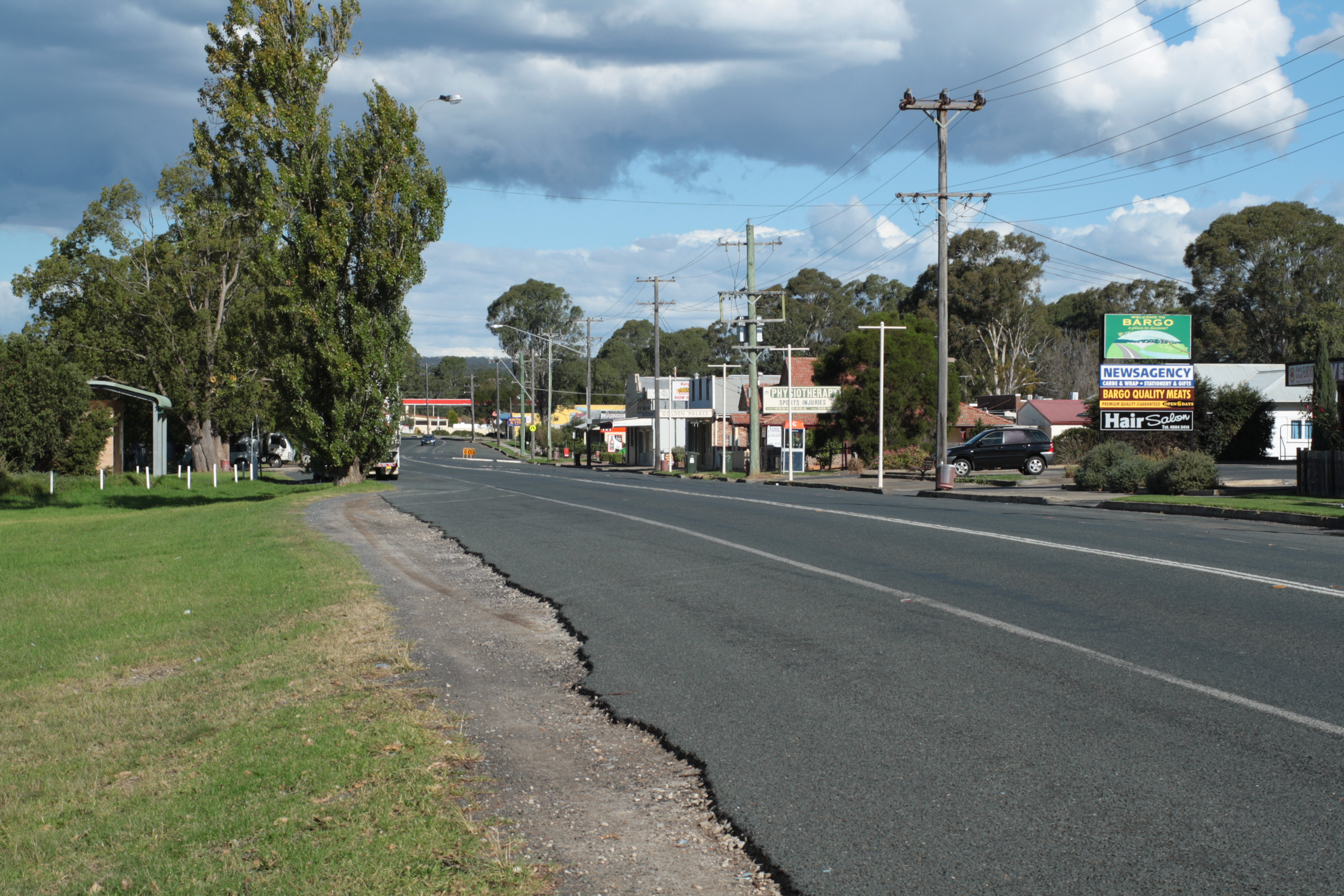
- Remembrance Drive, the town's high street

- Coordinates: 34°17′27″S 150°34′47″E
- Country: Australia
- State: New South Wales
- Region: Macarthur
- LGA: Wollondilly Shire
- Location: 100 km (62 mi) South-West of Sydney CBD; 15 km (9.3 mi) South of Picton; 25 km (16 mi) North-East of Mittagong

Government
  - State electorate: Wollondilly
  - Federal division: Hume
- Elevation: 338 m (1,109 ft)

Population
  - Total: 4,516 (2021 census)
- Postcode: 2574
Localities around Bargo
Couridjah	Tahmoor
	Bargo	Pheasants Nest
	Yanderra	Upper Nepean Catchment Area

Bargo is a town in the Macarthur Region of Greater Sydney in New South Wales, Australia, in the Wollondilly Shire. It is located approximately halfway between Campbelltown and Bowral, about 100 km south west of the Sydney CBD.

It is situated between the township of Tahmoor (north) and the village of Yanderra (south), and accessible via the Hume Highway that links Sydney, Canberra and Melbourne. It was previously known as West Bargo and Cobargo.

== History ==
The name Bargo may be derived from the local Aboriginal language name Barago, meaning cripple, thick scrub, or brushwood. The earliest reference to Barago was noted as by George Caley in a letter to Sir Joseph Banks on 25 September 1807. The Aboriginal people, called the Bargo area Narregarang, meaning that the soil was not firm – a shaky place. Caley's Aboriginal guide Mowatiin referred to the area's name as meaning "place of cliffs" or "thick shrubs".

Early explorers and convicts found getting through the Bargo area a difficult experience due to the thick scrub, explorers dubbing the tricky bush the "Bargo Brush". In early colonial times, Bargo Brush became notorious among travellers for harbouring convicts who had escaped from captivity and become bushrangers.

Bayley quotes William Riley, who passed through Bargo Brush on horseback in 1830:

"... a miserable, barren scrub, thickly wooded for eight miles; there having been so much rain lately this abominable part of the road was a continuation of bogs for eight miles." Soon the Brush, with its thickets for hideouts, became the lurking place for robbers and caused travel to become fraught with peril. The Sydney Gazette of 17 March 1832 reported the road as ". . . one uninterrupted morass"!

J. H. Heaton, under the heading 'Crimes and Criminals, Remarkable' lists "Desperate conflict between four police and eleven prisoners at Bargo Brush, N.S.W. Constable Raymond shot dead by a prisoner named James Crookwell, 15 April 1866."

Bargo is noted as being where the first recorded sightings of the lyrebird, koala and wombat took place by European settlers. Bargo is also near the site of an infamous massacre in 1816, when settlers forced local Aborigines to walk off a big cliff and shot them if they refused. Bargo Police Station, now abandoned, is currently used as a doctors' surgery. The lock-ups remain behind the building. The patrol area of the Bargo Police Station included Pheasants Nest, Bargo, parts of Tahmoor and Yanderra.

== Railway ==
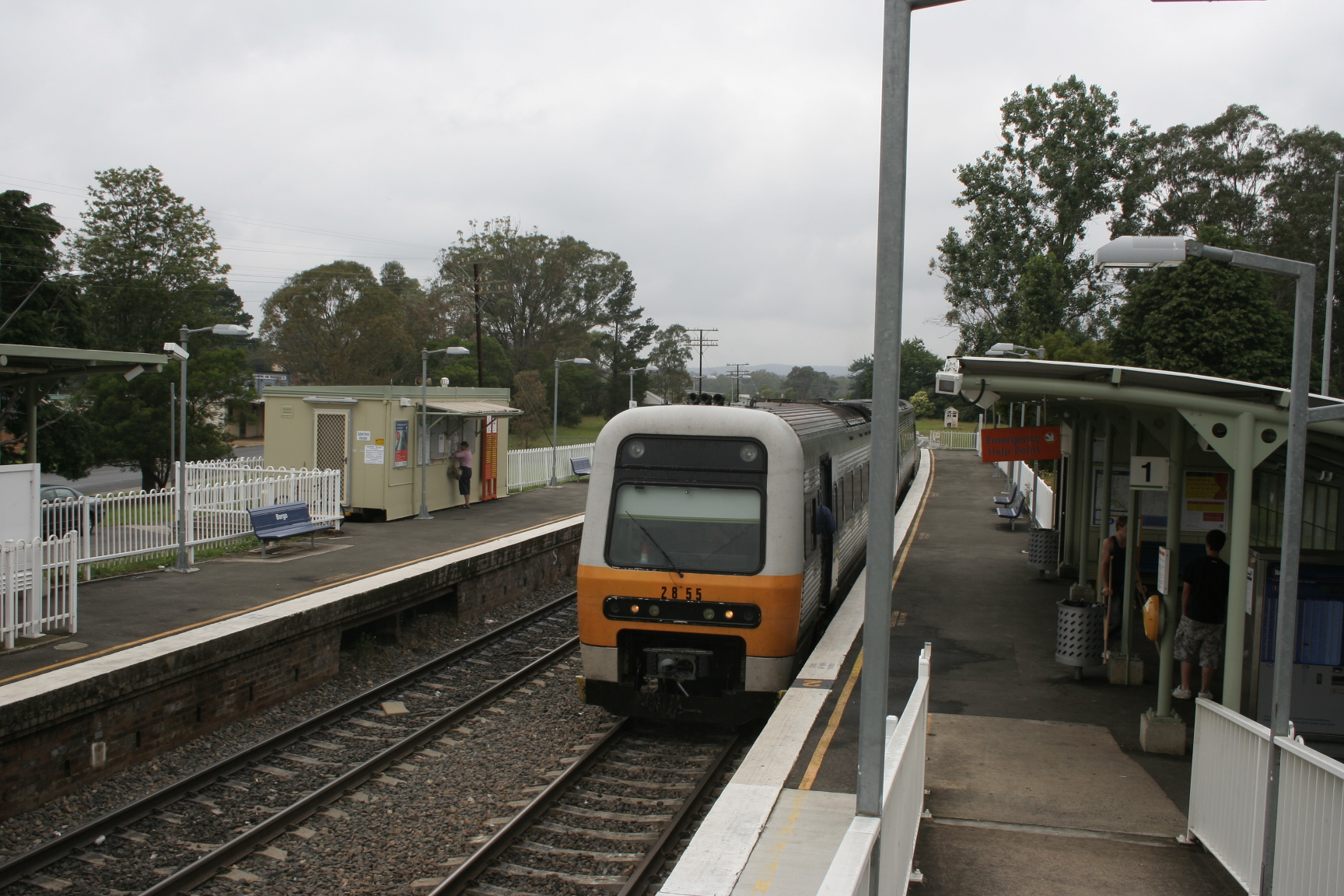
Bargo station

Bargo railway station was first opened on 19 July 1919 as West Bargo and then renamed in 1921 as Bargo. The station is on the Main South line and is served by Sydney Trains Southern Highlands Line services. The original Bargo railway station building on the eastern side of the platform was destroyed by arson; it was replaced by a demountable building.

== Heritage listings ==
Bargo has a number of heritage-listed sites, including:

- Avon Dam Road: Nepean Dam
- Hume Highway: Wirrimbirra Sanctuary
- Main Southern railway 96.265 km: Bargo railway viaduct

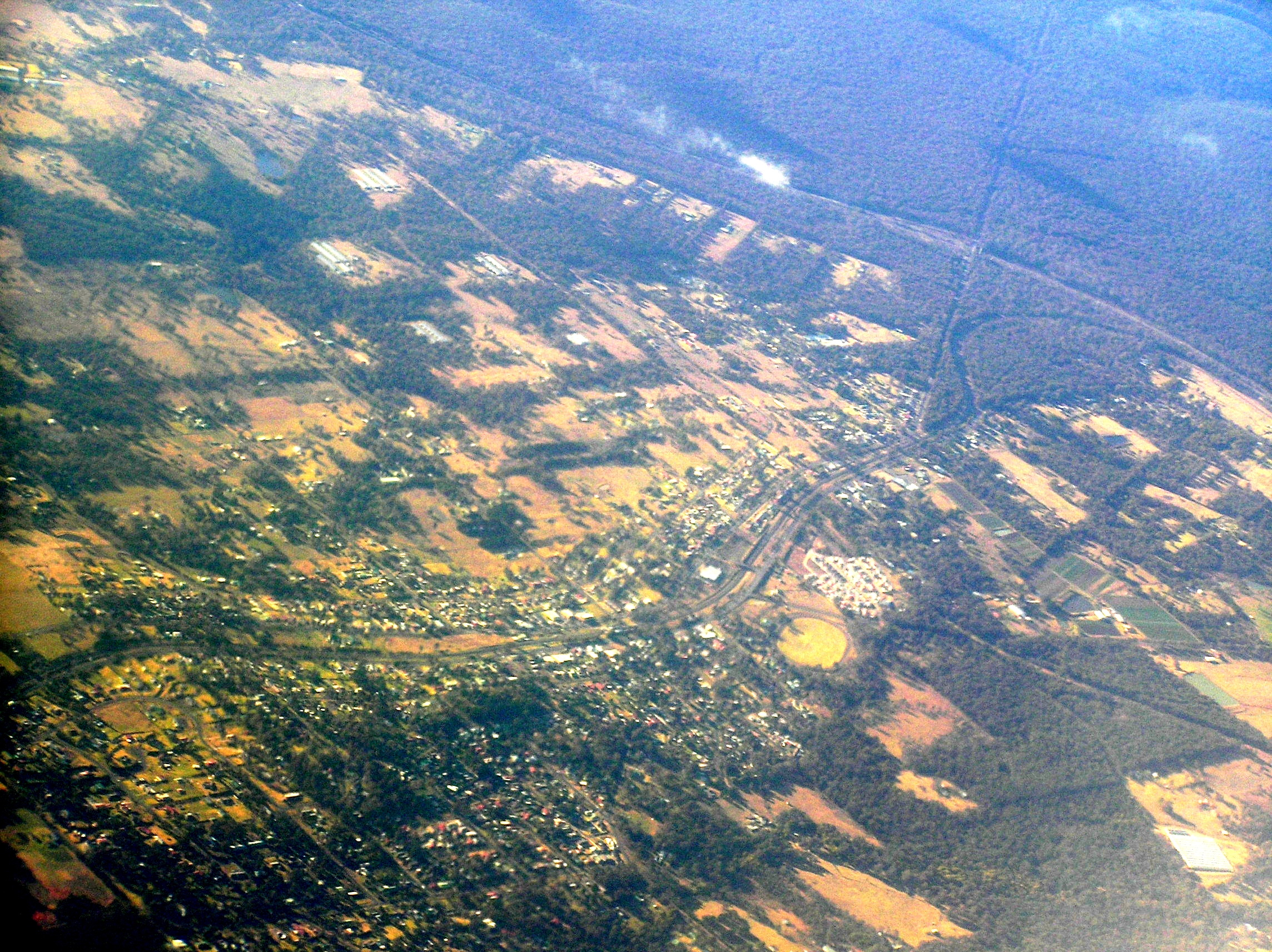
Bargo aerial photo from north west

== Population ==
At the time of the 2016 census, there were 4,393 people in Bargo.

- Aboriginal and Torres Strait Islander people made up 3.4% of the population.
- 82.6% of people were born in Australia. The next most common country of birth was England at 4.5%.
- 89.2% of people only spoke English at home.
- The most common responses for religion were Anglican 28.9%, Catholic 28.0% and No Religion 22.6%.

== Organisations ==
Wollondilly AFL Club

Australian Football was established in Bargo in 1982 at the Bargo Sportsground. Firstly with the Wollondilly Junior Australian Football Club – The Cygnets with teams from U9's – U15's competing in the Greater West Sydney Competition. Then followed in 1989 Wollondilly Senior Australian Football Club – The Knights fielding First Grade and Reserve teams in the South Coast AFL Competition. In 2014 Wollondilly Senior Australian Football Club moved into the Sydney AFL Competition, competing in Division 4. Both Junior & Senior clubs now play home games at Hannaford Oval, Wilton.

Yerrinbool-Bargo Bushrangers

Bargo is home to the Yerrinbool-Bargo Bushrangers soccer team. The team was established by a group of men in the Pub one night, the Bushrangers now have teams from Under 6 to All Age Men & Women competing in the Highlands Competition. Notably, the Yerrinbool-Bargo coalition soccer team is one of the only local soccer teams where two places of different regions and councils form a coalition; Yerrinbool is of the Southern Highlands and Wingecarribee Shire while Bargo is part of the Wollondilly Shire and Macarthur Region.

Bargo Rural Fire Brigade

Bargo Rural Fire Brigade was established 1939. From its humble beginnings, the brigade's few handtools and drum of water have been constantly upgraded to its present-day Pumper, Heavy Tanker and Light Tankers, housed in the purpose-built Village Two category building on the outskirts of the township. The brigade's services include fighting structure fires and bush fires in the local area and attending vehicle accidents on the Hume Highway where passes through Wilton, Pheasants Nest and Yanderra. Bargo Fire Brigade assists with out-of-area disasters, for example, the 1994 Sydney Bushfires, the Sydney Hail Storm of 1999, the bushfires of the Christmas period 2001/2002, and 2007 Gosford storm damage.

The Brigade celebrated its 70th year of operation on 26 December 2009.

Bargo Yanderra Tennis Association

has recently upgraded facilities with new court surfaces and is currently running an interclub competition between Thirlmere tennis club and Bargo. Ladies social competition are usually run on a Tuesday during school terms.

== In popular culture ==
W. A. Bayley observed:

"The whole road was a nightmare with its succession of bogs where bullock waggons sank to their axles. Drivers cut saplings to corduroy sections of the road and threw stones into bogholes. Teams on unbogged waggons were attached to teams on bogged vehicles to help pull them free; sometimes only to see them sink again! A waggon could take a couple of days from Bargo River to Mittagong, camping the night anywhere around Yerrinbool, then called Little Forest, before the steep climb of Catherine Hill which would then be attacked with fresh bullocks in the morning... The Sydney Morning Herald of 2 June 1865 reported that it had not been uncommon to see all the types of vehicles 'stuck fast or rather half buried in the numerous sloughs ... filled with mud .'

A verse of the Australian folk song Stringybark and Greenhide (circa 1865) celebrates the bad reputation among bullock drivers of the Bargo roads:

"If you travel on the road, and chance to stick in Bargo,
To avoid a bad capsize, you must unload your cargo;
For to pull a dray about, I do not see the force on,
Take a bit of greenhide, and hook another horse on."

== See also ==
- Bargo River
- Murder of Ebony Simpson
