= Ivory Chamberlain =

Ivory Chamberlain (March 13, 1821 - March 9, 1881) was the editor of the New York Herald. He was a political supporter of his friend and neighbor Horace Greeley of the New York Tribune. He also worked for Manton Marble at the New York World. He wrote a biography of Millard Fillmore.

Samuel Selwyn Chamberlain, who was also an influential writer at newspapers, and Elizabeth Chamberlain were his children.

When he went from the World to the Herald in 1876, he was very highly paid for an editorial writer. He was part of a small group of highly influential writers at the World involved in Democratic Party politics.

== Bibliography ==
- Biography of Millard Fillmore (1856), Thomas & Lathrops
