= Ottumwa Heights College =

Coordinates: 41.045°N 92.394°W

Ottumwa Heights College began as a liberal arts women's college based in Ottumwa, Iowa. It became coed in 1967. The school was affiliated with the Roman Catholic Church and was operated by the Sisters of Humility of Mary. Although the student body of the college was originally mostly Roman Catholic by the end of its existence a majority of its students were Protestant.

The institution was founded in 1864 as the Visitation Academy. In 1925, it was renamed the St. Joseph Academy. It received its first collegiate accreditation in 1928 and became known as the Saint Joseph Junior College, taking its final name Ottumwa Heights College in 1930. In 1936 St. Joseph School of Nursing became affiliated with Ottumwa Heights College. In 1957 the facility was destroyed in a fire and was rebuilt over the next 4 years. In 1967 male students were admitted to the college. Following this many more students lived off campus and in 1969 for the first time a majority of students were Protestants.

Ottumwa Heights merged with Indian Hills Community College in 1979 and was deemed officially inactive in 1980. Since 1981, the new IHCC campus has been located at the 126-acre (0.51 km^{2}) former Ottumwa Heights campus.

== See also ==
- List of current and historical women's universities and colleges in Iowa
