= James Ivory (mathematician) =

Scottish mathematician (1765–1842)

- Born: 17 February 1765; Dundee, Scotland UK
- Died: 21 September 1842 (aged 77); London, England
- Education: Dundee Academy; University of St Andrews; Edinburgh University
- Parents: James Ivory (father); Jane Brown (mother)
- Awards: Copley Medal (1814); Royal Medal (1826, 1839)
- Scientific career
- Fields: mathematics theology

James Ivory, FRS FRSE KH LLD (17 February 1765 – 21 September 1842) was a British mathematician. He stated and proved Ivory's lemma.

== Life ==
Ivory was born in Dundee, son of watchmaker James Ivory. The family lived and worked on the High Street in Dundee.

He was educated at Dundee Grammar School. In 1779 he entered the University of St Andrews, distinguishing himself especially in mathematics. He then studied theology; but, after two sessions at St Andrews and one at Edinburgh University, he abandoned all idea of the church, and in 1786 he became an assistant-teacher of mathematics and natural philosophy in the newly established Dundee Academy. Three years later he became partner in, and manager of, a flax spinning company at Douglastown in Forfarshire, while continuing mathematical research as a hobby. He was essentially a self-trained mathematician, and was not only deeply versed in geometry, but also kept up with contemporary developments in mathematical analysis.

He published a memoir with an analytical expression for the rectification of the ellipse in the Transactions of the Royal Society of Edinburgh (1796), and two others on cubic equations (1799) and the Kepler problem (1802). In 1804 the flax-spinning company he managed was dissolved, and he obtained one of the mathematical chairs in the Royal Military College, Great Marlow (later moved to Sandhurst), at which he remained until 1816, when failing health obliged him to resign.

During this period he published several important memoirs in the Philosophical Transactions, which earned for him the Copley Medal in 1814 and ensured his election as a Fellow of the Royal Society in 1815. Of special importance in the history of attractions is the first of these (1809), in which the attraction of a homogeneous ellipsoid upon an external point is reduced to the simpler case of the attraction of a related ellipsoid upon a corresponding point interior to it. This theorem is known as Ivory's theorem, though one of its lemmas, Ivory's lemma, is better known today and is itself sometimes called Ivory's theorem. He also anonymously published an edition of Euclid's Elements, which was described as having brought the difficult problems "more within the reach of ordinary understandings". His later papers in the Philosophical Transactions discuss astronomical refractions, planetary perturbations, equilibrium of fluid masses, etc. For his astronomical investigations he received a royal medal in 1826 and again in 1839.

In 1831, on the recommendation of Lord Brougham, King William IV granted him a yearly pension of £300 and appointed him Knight of the Royal Guelphic Order. He was directly connected with the Royal Society of Edinburgh and the Royal Irish Academy, and was corresponding member of the Royal Academies of Sciences of Paris and Berlin, and of the Royal Society of Göttingen.

In 1839, the University of St. Andrews conferred on him an honorary degree as a Doctor of Laws (LLD).

He died in Hampstead in north London on 21 September 1842.

== See also ==
- Eclipse
- Meridian arc
- Probability
- Proofs of Fermat's little theorem
- Rodrigues' formula
