= Ivory Harris =

American drug trafficker

Ivory Brandon Harris
- Born: c. 1985 (age 40–41); New Orleans, Louisiana, U.S.
- Other name: B-Stupid
- Occupations: Gangster, drug trafficker
- Status: Incarcerated
- Criminal charges: RS 29:212A — wrongful use, possession, manufacture, or distribution of controlled dangerous substances, RS 14:94 — Illegal carrying and discharge of weapons, RS 14:95 — Illegal carrying of weapons, RS 14:95.1 — Possession of firearm
- Penalty: 25 years in federal prison

Ivory Brandon Harris (born c. 1985), known as B-Stupid, is an American gangster from New Orleans, Louisiana, who gained notoriety when police accused him of committing murders in Houston and New Orleans. Following a 2006 arrest and 2007 plea deal, he is incarcerated in the federal prison system as of 2024.

Police said that Harris was associated with the "Dooney Boys," a group formed in the Magnolia Projects (C.J. Peete Projects) public housing community.

Prior to Hurricane Katrina, Harris had been arrested at least eight times in the 2000s and charged with murder twice; police could not get anyone to testify against him, so he could not be convicted of any serious crimes.

== Before Hurricane Katrina ==
Harris was arrested more than a dozen times as a juvenile. When Harris was 16, prosecutors charged him with killing 24-year-old Alphonse McGhee in the courtyard of the Magnolia Projects. A grand jury indicted Harris as an adult and charged him with first-degree murder. Two years elapsed as the district attorney considered Harris's mental competency. When a key witness's testimony was ruled inadmissible, the district attorney's office dropped the charges against Harris. Less than one month later, Harris was arrested for a weapons charge.

Police arrested Harris on June 19, 2005; Harris faced charges for shooting 30-year-old thrift store owner Yoshio Watson to death at a birthday party of a child at the 2600 block of Philip Street in Central City on May 12, 2005. On August 22, 2005, one week before Hurricane Katrina struck, the district attorney dropped the charges after a witness refused to cooperate. Harris remained in prison due to an aggravated battery case. After Katrina struck, Harris was placed in a prison in Shreveport, Louisiana.

Two weeks before Hurricane Katrina hit New Orleans, Jim Bernazzani, the Federal Bureau of Investigation agent in charge of the New Orleans field office, and the New Orleans police composed a list of 112 people who had proportionally committed the most crime in New Orleans; the police and FBI planned to build cases against them so they would be put in prison. Harris was one of the people on the list. When Hurricane Katrina struck New Orleans, Bernazzani retrieved a disc from the remains of the FBI building before being rescued; using the disc, Bernazzani sent the list to the FBI headquarters in Washington, D.C.

== After Hurricane Katrina ==
On November 3, 2005, Harris was released from the Shreveport prison.

At 4:20 a.m. on December 17, 2005, a man was shot to death at a Houston freeway intersection after he was involved in a fight in a nearby pool hall. Houston authorities wanted to question Harris about the murder. Sergeant Brian Harris (no relation), a Houston Police Department homicide investigator, described Harris as "the axle at the center of our wheel. He kept coming up."

On December 28, a man named Steven Kennedy was killed; police said that the murder was likely a revenge killing in response to the 2003 murder of a New Orleans rapper named James "Soulja Slim" Tapp; police charged Harris and Jerome Hampton for that crime.

In January 2006, Houston courts charged Harris, then 20 years old, for aggravated robbery and aggravated kidnapping charges. Harold Hurtt, chief of the Houston Police Department, said that Harris was "an extremely dangerous individual and we believe responsible for several murders." Hurtt believed that Harris traveled between Houston and New Orleans. Police arrested Harris on January 4, 2006, on a criminal trespassing charge in New Orleans and released him with a $2,500 bail. At the time, Harris was a suspect in three murders in Houston. Houston police launched a manhunt on February 16.

At around 1:30 a.m. on February 28, 2006, a man named Jermaine "Manny" Wise died of gunshot wounds inside a vehicle during Fat Tuesday, February 28, 2006, at the 5300 block of Constance Street in New Orleans. Wise's death was the sole recorded homicide in New Orleans on that day.

On March 19, 2006, members of the New Orleans Police Department and the Kenner Police Department arrested Harris at a Kenner apartment complex using a warrant for Wise's murder. According to the police, Harris had three and one-half ounces of heroin, three and one-half ounces of crack cocaine, a .45-cal. semiautomatic handgun, two loaded assault rifles, and $5,800. The U.S. attorney's office said that Harris boasted about being a drug dealer on his MySpace page. A man named Calvert "Soulja" Magee, with Harris, was also arrested. By March 27, a news article stated that Houston police suspected him of being a "common denominator in a wave of bloodshed" that involved eleven murder suspects who are evacuees.

Police also discovered that Harris had traveled between Houston and New Orleans between his release from the Shreveport jail and his arrest in the apartment; he used it as a base for dealing narcotics and keeping weapons. Bureau of Alcohol, Tobacco, and Firearms special agents discovered during a follow-up investigation that Magee convinced a woman to rent the apartment in her name so that Harris's and Magee's names did not appear on the lease. While in prison for these charges, Harris smuggled a mobile phone into his cell so he could communicate with Magee. He placed telephone calls asking for his associates to find the witness that saw him kill Wise; the associates did not find her, and law enforcement authorities relocated her after discovering the calls.

== Plea deal and sentencing ==
In 2007, Harris pleaded guilty to drug-trafficking and gun crimes, receiving a 25-year sentence in a federal court. As part of the plea deal, he also pleaded guilty in state court to killing Wise. Prosecutors from Louisiana allowed Harris to plead guilty to manslaughter for the death of Wise. By doing so, Harris avoided a murder trial for Wise's murder; Gwen Filosa of The Times-Picayune stated that if Harris had been tried for killing Wise, the trial would likely have led to a life sentence.

Harris, Federal Bureau of Prisons #30089-034, is in the United States Penitentiary, Lee. He is scheduled to be released on January 7, 2029.
