= Bargo River =

River in Australia

Coordinates: 34°14′S 150°37′E

Bargo
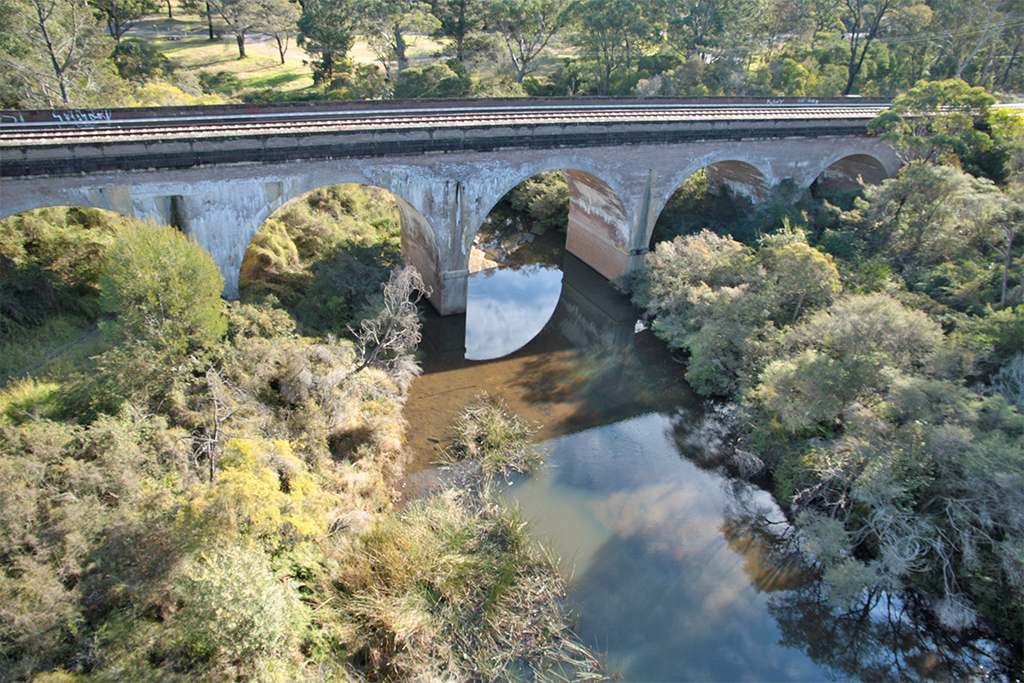
- Railbridge over Bargo River, Tahmoor, NSW Australia
- Etymology: Aboriginal: Barago, meaning cripple, thick scrub, or brushwood

Location
- Country: Australia
- State: New South Wales
- Region: Sydney Basin (IBRA), Southern Highlands, Macarthur
- Local government areas: Wingecarribee, Wollondilly

Physical characteristics
- Source: Colo Vale
  - location: northwest of Alpine
- Mouth: confluence with the Nepean River
  - location: near Bargo
- Length: 27 km (17 mi)

Basin features
- River system: Hawkesbury-Nepean catchment
- Tributaries
  - left: Ropesand Creek

The Bargo River, a watercourse of the Hawkesbury-Nepean catchment, is located in the Southern Highlands and Macarthur districts of New South Wales, Australia.

== Course ==
The Bargo River rises in the southern slopes of Southern Highlands, north of Colo Vale, and flows generally north-east, joined by two minor tributaries, before reaching its confluence with the Nepean River, near Bargo.

In its upper catchment, the river runs through Bargo River State Conservation Area, a nature reserve located between Hill Top and Yerrinbool.

== See also ==
- List of rivers of Australia
- List of rivers of New South Wales (A–K)
- Rivers of New South Wales
