= German Film Award for Best Documentary Film =

The German Film Award for Best Documentary Film (German: Deutscher Filmpreis – Bester Dokumentarfilm) is the award given to the best feature-length cinema documentary produced with majoritarian German funding. The current category was introduced in 2000, although numerous similar categories were in existence going back all the way to 1951.

As of 2020, besides the Lola statuette in gold, the winning film also receives 200.000 euros. A nomination is endowed with 100.00 euros. In 2012 the number of nominated films was raised from two to three.

== List of winning films ==
| Year | Film | Producer(s) | Director(s) |
|---|---|---|---|
| 2000 | Buena Vista Social Club | Ulrich Felsberg | Wim Wenders |
| 2001 | Havanna mi amor | Konstantin Kröning, Helge Albers | Uli Gaulke |
| 2002 | Black Box BRD | Thomas Kufus | Andres Veiel |
| 2003 | Rivers and Tides | Annedore von Donop | Thomas Riedelsheimer |
| 2004 | The Children Are Dead (Die Kinder sind tot) | Thomas Kufus | Aelrun Goette |
| 2005 | Rhythm Is It! | Uwe Dierks, Andrea Thilo, Thomas Grube | Thomas Grube, Enrique Sánchez Lansch |
| 2006 | Lost Children | Oliver Stoltz | Ali Samadi Ahadi, Oliver Stoltz |
| 2007 | Workingman's Death | Erich Lackner, Mirjam Quinte, Pepe Danquart | Michael Glawogger |
| 2008 | Pool of Princesses (Prinzessinnenbad) | Peter Schwartzkopff, Katja Siegel | Bettina Blümner |
| 2009 | NoBody's Perfect | Frank Henschke, Niko von Glasow | Niko von Glasow |
| 2010 | The Heart of Jenin (Das Herz von Jenin) | Ernst Ludwig Ganzert, Ulli Pfau | Marcus Vetter, Leon Geller |
| 2011 | Pina | Wim Wenders, Gian-Piero Ringel | Wim Wenders |
| 2012 | Gerhard Richter Painting | Thomas Kufus | Corinna Belz |
| 2013 | More than Honey | Thomas Kufus, Helmut Grasser, Pierre-Alain Meier | Markus Imhoof |
| 2014 | Beltracchi: The Art of Forgery (Beltracchi – Die Kunst der Fälschung) | Arne Birkenstock, Helmut G. Weber, Thomas Springer | Arne Birkenstock |
| 2015 | Citizenfour | Dirk Wilutzky, Laura Poitras, Mathilde Bonnefoy | Laura Poitras |
| 2016 | Above and Below | Helge Albers, Brigitte Hofer, Cornelia Seitler | Nicolas Steiner |
| 2017 | Cahier Africain | Stefan Tolz, Peter Spoerri | Heidi Specogna |
| 2018 | Beuys | Thomas Kufus | Andres Veiel (2.) |
| 2019 | Of Fathers and Sons | Ansgar Frerich, Eva Kemme, Tobias N. Siebert, Hans Robert Eisenhauer | Talal Derki |
| 2020 | Born in Evin | Alex Tondowski, Ira Tondowski | Maryam Zaree |
