= Inside the Uffizi =

- Directed by: Corinna Belz; Enrique Sánchez Lansch
- Written by: Corinna Belz; Enrique Sánchez Lansch
- Produced by: Thomas Kufus
- Starring: Eike Schmidt
- Cinematography: Johann Feindt; Thomas Riedelsheimer
- Edited by: Anne Fabini
- Music by: Christoph M. Kaiser; Julian Maas
- Production company: zero one film
- Release date: 25 November 2021
- Running time: 96 minutes
- Country: Germany
- Language: German

Inside the Uffizi (German: In den Uffizien) is a 2021 German documentary film about the Uffizi museum in Florence. It was directed by Corinna Belz and Enrique Sánchez Lansch.

== Synopsis ==
The film covers the Uffizi, a museum in Florence with more than 500 rooms, based on the House of Medici's collection of paintings. Attention is given to the institution's staff, including Eike Schmidt, a German art historian who became its director in 2015.

== Production ==
Filming took place during a total of 50 days over a period of 2 years.

== Release ==
Inside the Uffizi was released in Germany on 25 November 2021.

== Reception ==
Birgit Rieger of Der Tagesspiegel compared Inside the Uffizi to Gerhard Richter Painting, a film by Belz from 2011, and contrasted the distance with which the Uffizi personnel is portrayed to the intimacy of the previous film. Simon Hauck of Kino-Zeit said Inside the Uffizi contains joy and fascination, has the form of an "art-film essay" and in its best moments "also functions as a documentary meta-film about the desire to look at oneself in the shadow of history and turbo-technology since the turn of the millennium".

Inside the Uffizi was nominated for the German Film Award for Best Sound.
