= Thomas Grube =

German photographer (born 1971)

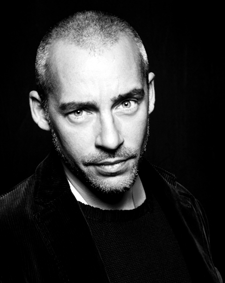
- Thomas Grube
- Born: 1971 (age 53–54); Berlin
- Education: Freie Universität Berlin; Konrad Wolf Film University of Babelsberg
- Occupations: Photographer; Film director; Film producer

Thomas Grube (born 1971) is a German photographer, film director, script writer and film producer. With his partner Uwe Dierks, he has written scripts and directed films about classical music, such as Rhythm Is It!

== Life ==
Born in Berlin, Grube studied political science, American studies and Eastern European studies at the Freie Universität Berlin as well as film and television business at the Konrad Wolf Film University of Babelsberg. At the same time, he worked as director and producer.

In 1993, he founded his first production company, with which he made short films, reports and music films as author, director and film producer. His first long film was Love is the Message in 1995. The music film (among others with Sven Väth, WestBam, Kid Paul, Moby, Cosmic Baby) was released by Studio K7 and is a comprehensive documentation of the early Techno generation of which he himself was a member. In 1996, Grube met his partner Uwe Dierks. Both were strongly inspired by the personality and music of the American composer and conductor Leonard Bernstein and shifted their focus to the genre of classical music. Together they realised various documentaries and music films as directors and producers, including Claudio Abbado, Plácido Domingo, Christoph Eschenbach, Hilary Hahn, Lang Lang, Anne Sophie Mutter and Li Yundi.

In 1999, Grube and Dierks founded, together with Andrea Thilo, the company Boomtown Media GmbH & Co. KG in Berlin. Since then, Grube has realised numerous documentary films for television and cinema as director and producer. For Warschau Express, he was nominated for the German Film Award in 2000. The documentary Rhythm Is It!, with Enrique Sánchez Lansch about a community outreach project of Berliner Philharmoniker with Simon Rattle, received its premiere at the 2004 Berlin International Film Festival 2004, and won the Bavarian Film Award, and in 2005 the German Film Award. In February 2008, his film Trip to Asia (world premiere at the Berlin Festival) was released in German cinemas. Trip to Asia, the first feature film about the mysterious inner life of the Berliner Philharmoniker and its chief conductor Sir Simon Rattle, received the Tiempo del Historia Award for "Best Documentary" at the 2008 Valladolid International Film Festival. Rhythm Is It! is one of the most successful documentaries in German cinema.

As a producer, Grube was responsible for the cinema documentaries Porgy and Me - In the World of Gershwin's Porgy and Bess (world premiere Hof International Film Festival 2009), Friedensschlag - Das Jahr der Entscheidung (world premiere Berlin International Film Festival 2010; PDF; 135-kB) by Gerardo Milsztein or Cinema Jenin - The Story of a Dream (world premiere at the International Documentary Film Festival Amsterdam) by Marcus Vetter 2011. The documentary film Friedensschlag, which was released in German cinemas in 2010, received the Deutscher Kamerapreis in the same year ("Best documentary film"). The project Cinema Jenin was awarded the Friedenspreis des Deutschen Films – Die Brücke 2011. The film was also awarded the German Camera Prize 2012 and was released by Wild Bunch in German cinemas in June 2012.

In 2014 he accompanied the organ virtuoso Cameron Carpenter on the way to the creation of his International Touring Organ. The film The Sound of my Life was released in 2014. In the years 2014 to 2016, Grube accompanied the 150th anniversary of the BASF group in Europe, the US, South America and India with the feature film Experiment 150. The world premiere of Experiment 150 took place in 2016 at the 12th Festival des deutschen Films in Ludwigshafen.

Besides his work as author and director, Grube also realises commercials as director and is responsible for the production company BOOMTOWN MEDIA as film producer. Grube is a member of the Deutsche Filmakademie.
