= Israeli–Arab organ donations =

Some families of Jews and Arabs killed in the Israeli-Arab conflict have chosen to donate organs to transplant patients on the "opposite side". Examples are Yoni Jesner, a 19-year-old student at Yeshivat Har Etzion in Gush Etzion, and Ahmed Khatib, a Palestinian boy shot by Israel Defense Forces soldiers who mistook his toy gun for a real one. The generosity of families prepared to donate the organs of their loved ones under such circumstances has been praised. Their story was also made the subject of an award-winning BBC World Service program, Heart and Soul, in 2007.

According to a 2004 study, "the rate of organ donations among Arabs and Jews in Israel is proportional to their representation in the general population," and the main reason for donating organs was altruism that cuts across the boundaries of religion and ethnic groups.

== Yoni Jesner ==
Yonatan "Yoni" Jesner was a 19-year-old Scottish Jew who was killed by a Palestinian suicide bomber on September 19, 2002, in Tel Aviv. Yoni was one of 220 victims of the bombing attacks in 2002. He was killed in the Allenby Street bus bombing. Hamas took responsibility for the attack. Yoni, born in Glasgow, was named after Yoni Netanyahu, who was killed while leading Operation Entebbe to release hostages from Air France flight, hijacked by Palestinian terrorists. Jesner was planning to attend medical school at UCL in London. He was passionate about his Jewish heritage and came to Israel to study in a Jewish yeshiva for a year after finishing high school, where he would eventually decide to stay for a second year. Jesner was a senior counselor in the Bnei Akiva youth movement in Glasgow. After his death, Bnei Akiva raised money to buy an ambulance for Magen David Adom in his memory. Each year, on the eve of the Jewish festival of Sukkot, his Yahrzeit is commemorated by his family. Also, he is remembered at a learning programme run by Bnei Akiva on the Jewish festival of Hoshana Raba.

His motivation for pursuing medicine was the belief that the commandment to save a life takes precedence over all other commandments. He loved Israel and planned to return to Israel as a doctor.

Jesner sustained a critical head injury during a suicide bomb attack on a Tel Aviv bus. His parents signed their consent to detaching him from life support and donating his organs. The recipient was Yasmin Abu Ramila, a seven-year-old Palestinian girl from East Jerusalem born with kidney failure. Most of her life, her parents had her to West Jerusalem several times a week for treatment by Israeli doctors. She had been waiting to receive a transplant for two years. Yoni's brother Ari spoke to the media about the family decision. He said: "I think the most important principle here is that life was given to another human being." Scott Simon commented on the symbolism of Yoni's wish to become a doctor never becoming a reality, yet still saving a life even in his death: "Yoni Jesner will not live to become a doctor, but just as surely, he will be remembered as a healer. Yasmin Rumeileh's father, Abu, who runs a tea and coffee shop in East Jerusalem, said this week, "We are one family. They saved my daughter. Part of their son is living in my daughter. We are all one people." After the surgery Yasmin was doing well and doctors believed she had a very good chances to live a normal life.

== Ahmed Khatib ==
Ahmed Khatib of Jenin, 12, was shot by an Israeli soldier in November 2005 when the toy gun he was waving was allegedly presumed to be a real one. Khatib was taken to an Israeli hospital in Haifa, but the doctors were unable to save his life. After his death his parents donated four of his organs to four Jewish and two Arab citizens of Israel. Khatib's heart was transplanted into a 12-year-old Druze girl. A Jewish teenager received his lungs. Khatib's liver was divided between a seven-month-old Jewish girl, who did not survive the surgery, and a 58-year-old Jewish woman. His kidneys were divided between a three-year-old Jewish girl and a five-year-old Bedouin boy, Mohammed Kabua.

Ehud Olmert called Ahmed's father, Ismail, extended his condolences and invited him to visit his office in Jerusalem. Ismail said: "I will go if it will promote peace. I will tell him one thing: children have nothing to do with this conflict." The father said: "My son was dead, but six Israelis now have a part of a Palestinian in them, and maybe he is still alive in them."

Not everyone in Jenin approved of the organ donations. Some neighbors asked "how they could give their child's body parts to the people who killed him," but Ahmed's mother Abla said she was visited by more than ten other mothers who lost their children in the conflict who supported the decision. The mufti of Jenin assured the family that there were no religious objections to the donation of organs, or to them going to either Israelis or Jews. While denouncing the soldiers as "criminals", Ahmed's mother Abla explained why she agreed to the donations: "We saw a lot of painful scenes in the hospital. I have seen children in deep need of organs, in deep pain. It doesn't matter who they are. We didn't specify that his organs would go to Arabs, Christians or Jews. I didn't want my son to suffer, I didn't want other children to suffer regardless of who they are". Ahmed's father Ismail worked as a car mechanic in Israel for many years. His contact with ordinary Israelis influenced his decision to donate his son's organs. On the day of his death, Ahmed had visited Jenin's "martyrs' graveyard", the cemetery for Palestinian rebels who died fighting Israel. Like most Palestinian children, Ahmed considered them heroes, prompting his father to remark that he was unsure if Ahmed would have approved the decision to donate his organs to Israelis. After his son's death, he established a youth center, the Ahmed Khatib Center for Peace, which offers a film-making course, and helped to reopen Cinema Jenin.

The story about his parents' decision to donate their son's organs became the subject for the PBS documentary The Heart of Jenin.

== Other organ donations ==
Organ transplants in which the recipient is a Palestinian and the donor an Israeli, or vice versa are not unusual at Hadassah Medical Center. In one case, a 41-year-old Palestinian from Bethlehem received the kidney of a 38-year-old Israeli who died of a stroke. When no suitable candidate was found in the Israeli registry, the Israeli National Center for Organ Transplantation contacted the Palestinian Authority. The Israeli family did not speak to the media, but said they felt privileged to take part in "creating the mosaic of peace".

Mazen Joulani, 33, a pharmacist, was shot dead in front of a Jerusalem café in 2001. His family agreed to a heart transplant to an Israeli Jewish patient. The Israeli police said it suspected Joulani had been killed by a fellow Palestinian, a hypothesis his family rejects.

In 2010, a Palestinian family from East Jerusalem donated the organs of their three-year-old child who died in a home accident. The recipients were Israeli Jews.

== See also ==
- Arab-Israeli peace projects
- Health care in Israel
