= Dance United =

Dance United is a non-profit organisation with projects in Ethiopia, Central London, Wessex and Yorkshire. Youths marginalised in society participate in intensive contemporary dance training, which in turn offers them educational qualifications and useful life skills. Each Dance United location has a professional dance company made up of past academy members or local university dancers. The performance company has worked with choreographers such as Dam Van Huynh, Sara Dowling, Lizzie Kew Ross, Darren Ellis and John Ross. Performances have been held in well-known venues throughout England including Sadler's Wells, Two-Temple Place, The Place, Royal Festival Hall, Theatre Royal Winchester, Queen Elizabeth Hall and the Lawrence Batley Theatre. Over the years, Dance United has worked with a diverse range of beneficiaries, including Ethiopian street children, adult women prisoners and people from across the political divides in Berlin and Belfast.

== History ==
=== Ethiopia ===
In 1995, TV producer, Andrew Coggins, had planned to make a filmed drama about the plight of Ethiopian street children. It was never to be made, for during the research for the film he was challenged by a senior aid agency executive not to speak for the young people but to give them the tools to speak for themselves.

In unfamiliar territory, Andrew instinctively turned to the two worlds he knew, film and the performing arts. He created a partnership with an Addis Ababa NGO, the Ethiopian Gemini Trust and together they established Gem TV, a film-making company run by former street and working children which continues to this day. For the live art form they chose dance. A range of distinguished teachers came to work with Adugna including Tara-Jane Herbert, Susannah Broughton, Mags Byrne, Tamara McClorg and Royston Maldoom.

Over six years, eighteen young Ethiopians were intensively trained to become professional dancers, teachers and choreographers. Together, they went on to form the Adugna Dance Theatre Company.

After watching this project unfold and in an attempt to expand the work, Andrew Coggins, Royston Maldoom and Mags Byrne founded Dance United, as a registered UK charity in 2000.

=== Berlin ===
Sir Simon Rattle of the Berliner Philharmoniker, insisted that his work with the orchestra include outreach work within the community. Dance United was brought in to develop three major dance performance partnerships from 2003 to 2005. The final project of Stravinsky's Le Sacre du printemps with school children formed the basis for an internationally successful documentary, Rhythm Is It! (2004).

=== Northern Ireland ===
Mags Byrne began the process of developing work in Northern Ireland. She designed a sensitive programme of dance-led projects with disadvantaged young people. Her work grew steadily over the years and in early 2007 she was able to launch a completely independent organisation: Dance United Northern Ireland.

=== Criminal Justice ===
In 2001 Royston Maldoom and Susannah Broughton had delivered a seminal project in HM Prison Holloway and Susannah undertook a tracking initiative to gauge just what impact the work had, over time on the women who had taken part. Encouraged by what she discovered, Susannah invited Tara-Jane Herbert (who went on to become Dance United's Artistic Director from 2005 to 2011) to join her in creating a longer programme of activity specifically aimed at working with women in prison. Over the next four years the two artists created and led an impressive sequence of three-week intensive performance projects at a range of prisons across the country.

== Academy ==
Young people living within the community commit to attending five days a week, six hours a day. While maintaining contemporary dance training of a professional standard, participants can earn qualifications at levels 1 and 2 through a National Open College Network accredited curriculum. The programme culminates in public performances which demands cooperation and responsibility. This often leads to a sense of achievement, which, in return, encourages ambition. There are currently cohorts running throughout the year in Bradford, London and Wessex.

=== Mentoring ===
Dance United Volunteer Mentors give one-to-one support to our young people, helping them plan and achieve their personal goals beyond the London Academy. Mentees may need support re-entering education, identifying training opportunities or applying for a job. Mentors meet with their mentee fortnightly for one year. These volunteers are from all walks of life and want to make a difference. Mentors complete two days of training and receive ongoing supervision throughout the year.

== Performance Companies ==
Dance United's performance companies are a progression route for Academy graduates who want to continue developing their interest in dance. The companies also welcome young dance students from local colleges. Each company works with renowned teachers and choreographers, thus providing an opportunity for its members to perform at high-profile dance platforms and Academy events across the UK.

=== London Performance Company ===
Formed in January 2011.

Upcoming Performances

2 Temple Place
2 Temple Place, Strand London WC2R 3BD
Thursday, 4 April 2013 7pm and 8pm
Friday 5 April 2013 7pm and 8pm
Choreography: Sarah Dowling
Name of the piece: If the walls could speak

Trinity Laban Theatre
Creekside, Deptford, SE8 3DZ as part of U-DANCE 2013
Sunday 14 April 2013, 7pm
Choreography: Lee Smikle
Name of the piece: Silver

Past Performances
A Holding Space, 20 & 22 October 2012, The Place
Opening of Koestler Exhibition, 19 September 2012, Southbank Centre
London Academy Graduation, 18 August 2012, Unicorn Theatre
Arrival of Olympic Torch, 26 July 2012, Kings Cross St Pancras
Big Dance-Sadler's Wells, 7 July 2012, Granary Square-Kings Cross
Festival of the World, 25 June 2012, Queen Elizabeth Hall
Celebrate the City, 23 June 2012, Cheapside Street EC2V
World Refugee Day, 20 June 2012, Matrix Chambers
London Academy Graduation 4 April 2012, Bernie Grant Arts Centre
ReFresh 2012 18 February 2012, The Place
Speak but one word to me 25th, 26, 27 January 2012, Two Temple Place
FRESH 3 December 2011, The Place
COMMA 40 18 November 2011, Bloomberg SPACE
Rite of Passage 1 6 & 7 September 2011, Sadler's Wells Lilian Baylis Studio Theatre
London Academy Graduation 20 July 2011, The Cochrane Theatre
Flashmob 10 July 2011, Royal Opera House Front of House
Scoop Festival 9 July 2011, The Scoop at More London
London Academy 3 week performance 14 June 2011, RichMix
Project Earth 24 May 2011, Selfridges Ultralounge
London Academy Graduation 20 April 2011, Westminster Kingsway College
London Academy 3 week performance 8 March 2011, Bernie Grant Arts Centre

=== Wessex Boys ===
Made up of solely Wessex Academy graduates and each member is pursuing a professional dance course at university.

=== Yorkshire Performance Company ===
The Dance United Yorkshire Performance Company was established in 2006 alongside the initial development of ‘The Academy’ project in Bradford. The company, predominantly formed of academy graduates, has represented Dance United Yorkshire locally, regionally and nationally at a range of conferences and events and have performed at numerous high-profile UK venues including the West Yorkshire Playhouse, the Lawrence Batley Theatre, the Lilian Bayliss Theatre, the Bonnie Bird Theatre, the Riley Theatre and the Royal Festival hall. In 2009, the company took part in ‘Destino’ on the main stage at Sadler's Wells and, in 2010, two dancers worked on a Dance United Yorkshire project in the Netherlands as part of the International Community Arts Festival. The company continues to be a progression route for all young people involved in Dance United Yorkshire's intensive projects.

== Film ==
Destino: A Contemporary Dance Story traces a journey from the back streets of Addis Ababa to one of the most famous dance stages in the world. The film encapsulates the way in which the project brought the company's work full circle as it features two of the original street child from Addis Ababa and now international dancers, at its heart. The documentary has gone on to be screened at film festivals across the globe.

Screenings 2010

Baxter Dance Film Festival, Cape Town, South Africa 20 August 2010
Portobello Film Festival, London 2 –19 September 2010
Cambridge Film Festival 16 – 26 September 2010
International Film Festival, South Africa 2 – 7 November 2010
Red Rock Festival of Zion Canyon, Utah, USA 12 November 2010
dance screen at Cinedans 2010, Amsterdam 6 – 12 December 2010

Screenings 2011

Dance on Camera Festival, NYC 26 January 2011
SEE: The Brighton Documentary Film Festival, 24–27 February 2011
Moves 2011-International Festival of Movement on Screen, 27 April – 1 May 2011
Addis International Film Festival, 26 June 2011
DOCUTAH Southern Utah International Festival, 8 – 17 September 2011
SHORT FORMATS International New Dance Festival, Italy 7 – 10 October 2011
InShadow 3rd International Festival, Portugal 2nd – 11th Dec 2011

== Future Projects ==
Dance United London is currently developing a project working specifically with people aged 18–35 who deal with mental health issues called the South London Project. Participants attend a full time contemporary dance training program from Monday to Friday, 10 am to 4 pm, for four weeks. Applications for role models are being accepted until Friday, 25 October. It is a pilot project for Dance United. There will be a small performance at the end. The process will be made into a short documentary.

== Press ==
Dance United was featured in the New York Times on August 15, 2013. The article focused on Dance United Yorkshire's "Families First" Project based in Leeds. The article can be viewed here. It reached half a million users on Facebook and Twitter and has been reprinted in Brazil, China, and Dubai.

Dance United took part in Digital October's Knowledge Stream. The objective is to introduce Russian audiences to international advancements in science and business. They feature laboratories and universities from around the world on their online video conferences. Michelle Bynoe (Creative Director, Academies and Training) and Carly Annable-Coop (Alliance Dance Director) gave a live presentation via video-conference to an audience in Moscow. The video can be watched here.
