= Thomas Kufus =

German film producer

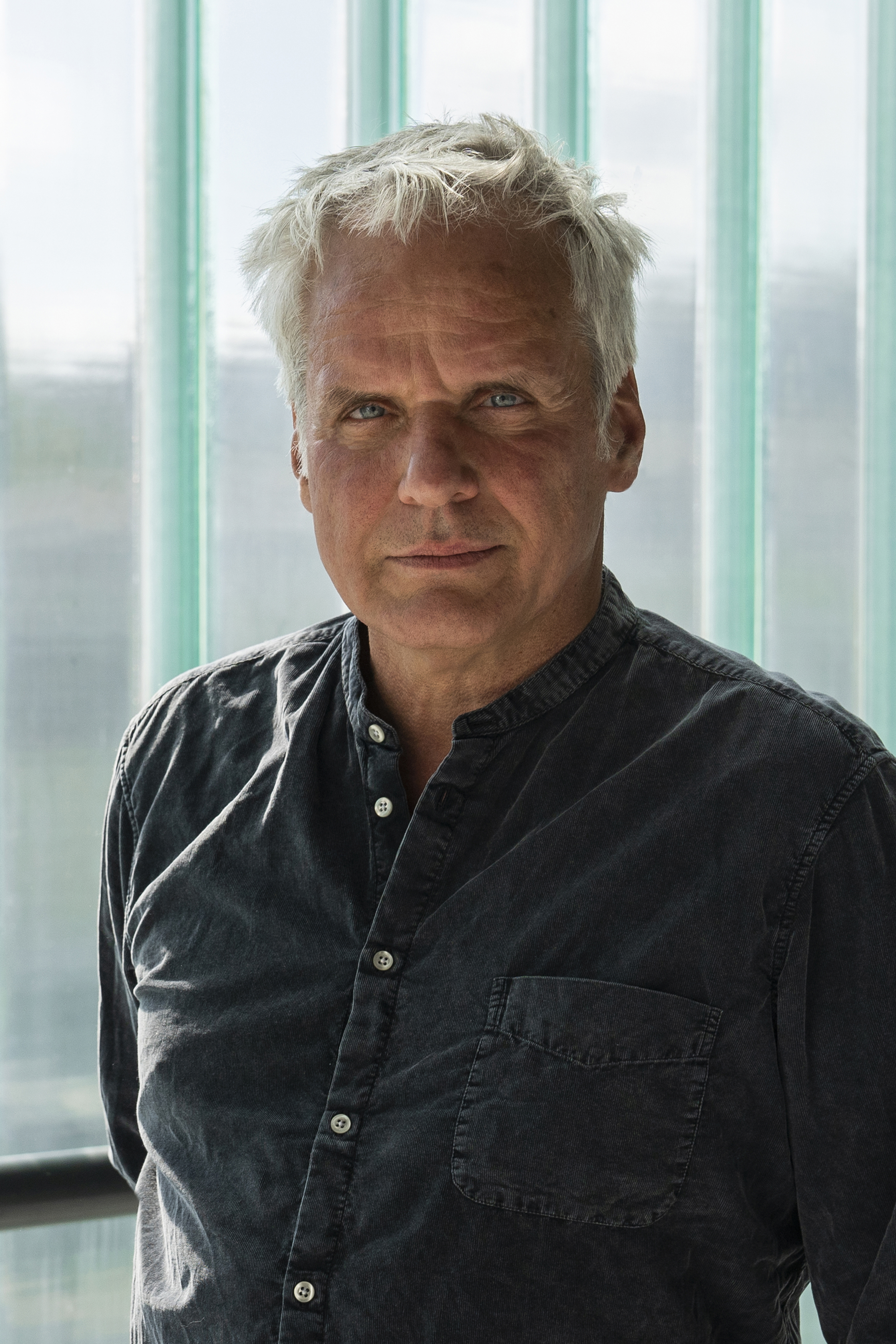
Thomas Kufus in 2020

Thomas Kufus (born 1957) is a German film producer especially known for documentary films.

== Life and career ==
Thomas Kufus was born in Essen in 1957. He began his filmmaking career as a director but switched to producing, becoming known as one of Germany's most influential producers of documentary films. He co-founded the production company zero one film which he since 2008 runs together with Volker Heise.

Among the directors he has produced films for are Lars Kraume, Andres Veiel, Anne Zohra Berrached, Julia Albrecht, Markus Imhoof, Christian Schwochow, Corinna Belz, Arnon Goldfinger and Alexander Sokurov. In 2009 he produced 24 Hours Berlin, a project where 80 cameramen each documented 24 hours in Berlin, with 1440 minutes of footage broadcast on Rundfunk Berlin-Brandenburg and Arte.

Kufus has produced four films that received the German Film Award for Best Documentary Film: Black Box BRD (2001), Gerhard Richter Painting (2011), More than Honey (2012) and Beuys (2017). He produced The People vs. Fritz Bauer which received the German Film Award for Best Fiction Film in 2016.

Kufus was chairman of the Deutsche Filmakademie from 2009 to 2015. He received the 2023 Carl Laemmle Produzentenpreis.

== Selected filmography ==
Filmography adapted from Filmportal.de.

- Mother and Son (1997)
- Moloch (1999)
- Black Box BRD (2001)
- The Children Are Dead (2003)
- 24 Hours Berlin (2009)
- The Flat (2011)
- Gerhard Richter Painting (2011)
- More than Honey (2012)
- Father and Son (2013)
- West (2013)
- The People vs. Fritz Bauer (2015)
- 24 Weeks (2016)
- Peter Handke: In the Woods, Might Be Late (2016)
- Beuys (2017)
- The Silent Revolution (2018)
- Inside the Uffizi (2021)
- Measures of Men (2023)
