= Lior Geller =

American film director

- Education: Tel Aviv University
- Occupations: Film Producer, Screenwriter, Director and Cinematographer
- Known for: Writer, Director and Producer of The World Will Tremble, Writer, Director and Producer of Roads, a student short film that has set a Guinness World Record

Lior Geller (Hebrew: ליאור גלר) is an Emmy Award nominated Israeli-American film director, screenwriter, producer, editor, cinematographer, composer, and Guinness World Record holder, best known for writing, directing and producing the feature film The World Will Tremble which tells the true story of the first escape from the first Nazi death camp during World War II.

== Early life and education ==
Lior Geller grew up in Highland Park, New Jersey and Ramat Gan, Israel. He studied film at the Steve Tisch School of Film and Television at Tel Aviv University.

== Career ==
Geller started his film career editing movie trailers and writing, directing and producing several short films, including the multiple award winning short film "Roads" which was nominated for a Student Academy Award and currently sets the Guinness World Record for Most Awards Won by a Short Student Film.

In 2008, Geller wrote and directed an Emmy nominated documentary which premiered at the 2008 Toronto International Film Festival, won multiple awards, was sold to PBS in the United States where it played on its Wide Angle series in 2009, earning Geller an Emmy nomination.

Following the success of "Roads", Geller was brought to Hollywood where he sold his first feature screenplay "Alone in Damascus" to Eric Eisner’s Double E Pictures. After the sale of "Alone in Damascus", Geller went on to sell multiple screenplays as a screenwriter and direct several unscripted television series.

Geller's feature film debut, We Die Young, premiered at the 2019 Mammoth Film Festival on February 7, 2019, in Mammoth Lakes, CA as the festival’s opening night gala film. Prior to the screening, the film was preemptively purchased by Lionsgate Films for distribution in the United States. Lionsgate released the film on March 1, 2019 to critical acclaim with particular praise for Geller’s direction and the performance of lead actor Jean-Claude Van Damme.

His second film, The World Will Tremble, had its world premiere at the Miami Jewish Film Festival in Miami, Florida, on 16 January 2025 and was released in US theaters March 14, 2025 by Vertical. The film holds a 93% rating on review aggregator website site Rotten Tomatoes, has been called "Astonishing... the first great film of 2025" by film critic Keith Arlington, and has become an international streaming sensation reaching the global Netflix top ten and securing the number one spot in multiple countries.

== Awards and nominations ==
Since 2007 Geller has received numerous awards and nominations setting a Guinness World Record for Most Awards Won by a Short Student Film for "Roads".

Year	Festival	Award	Title	Result
2007	Aubagne International Film Festival	Special Mention	Roads	Won
2007	Beijing College Student Film Festival	Jury Award	Roads	Won
2007	Euromed Cafe FondazioneMediterraneo	Inspiration Award	Roads	Won
2007	Jerusalem Film Festival	Wolgin Award for Best Short Film	Roads	Won
2007	Montpellier Mediterranean Film Festival	Youth Audience Award	Roads	Won
2007	Montpellier Mediterranean Film Festival	Short Film Grand Prize	Roads	Nominated
2008	Festival Inventa Un Film, Italy	Third Prize	Roads	Won
2008	Festival Inventa Un Film, Italy	Best Editing	Roads	Won
2008	Festival Inventa Un Film, Italy	Best Soundtrack	Roads	Won
2008	CILECT International Association of Film Schools	Best Film	Roads	Won
2008	Cinerail Film Festival, Paris	Georges Ragot Prize	Roads	Won
2008	Circuito Off Venice International Short Film Festival	RTP2 Award	Roads	Won
2008	Circuito Off Venice International Short Film Festival	Special Mention	Roads	Won
2008	Israel Film Festival	Audience Award	Roads	Won
2008	Encounters International Film Festival	International Jury Award	Roads	Nominated
2008	Expresion en Corto International Film Festival	Best Fiction Short Film	Roads	Nominated
2008	FIKE - Évora International Short Film Festival	Best Film	Roads	Won
2008	International Festival of Film Schools, Mexico	Best Film	Roads	Won
2008	Kraków Film Festival	Best European Short Film	Roads	Nominated
2008	Larissa Mediterranean Festival of New Filmmakers	Special Jury Mention	Roads	Nominated
2008	London Film Festival	Prix UIP London (European Short Film)	Roads	Nominated
2008	Nashville Jewish Film Festival (NJFF)	Student Film Competition	Roads	Won
2008	Oberhausen International Short Film Festival	Grand Prize	Roads	Won
2008	Odense International Film Festival	Grand Prix	Roads	Nominated
2008	Potsdam Sehsüchte	Best Fiction	Roads	Nominated
2008	San Francisco Jewish Film Festival	Best Short Film	Roads	Nominated
2008	Student Academy Awards, USA	Honorary Foreign Film Award – Best Foreign Film	Roads	Nominated
2008	São Paulo International Short Film Festival	MostraInternacionale– Best Film	Roads	Nominated
2008	Taipei Film Festival	Golden Lion International Student Film Competition	Roads	Nominated
2008	Tampere International Short Film Festival	Grand Prix	Roads	Nominated
2008	Tel Aviv International Student Film Festival	Best International Short	Roads	Nominated
2008	Tribeca Film Festival	Student Visionary Award	Roads	Nominated
2008	U Frame International Academic Film Festival	Jury First Prize	Roads	Won
2008	Dubai International Film Festival	People’s Choice Award	The Heart of Jenin	Won
2008	Leipzig DOK Festival	Best Documentary	The Heart of Jenin	Won
2008	Valladolid International Film Festival	Best Documentary	The Heart of Jenin	Won
2008	Warsaw International Film Festival	Best Documentary	The Heart of Jenin	Won
2008	Warsaw Jewish Film Festival	Special Mention	The Heart of Jenin	Won
2008	Warsaw Jewish Film Festival	Best Documentary Feature	The Heart of Jenin	Nominated
2008	Warsaw Jewish Film Festival	Best Fiction Short	Roads	Nominated
2009	Flickerfest International Short Film Festival	Best Film	Roads	Nominated
2009	Cinema for Peace Awards	Most Valuable Documentary of the Years	The Heart of Jenin	Won
2009	European Film Awards	European Documentary	The Heart of Jenin	Nominated
2009	The Hague Movies that Matter Festival	Audience Award	The Heart of Jenin	Won
2009	The Hague Movies that Matter Festival	AllRights Award	The Heart of Jenin	Nominated
2009	San Diego Jewish Film Festival	Audience Award	Roads	Nominated
2009	Utah Arts Festival (Fear No Film)	Audience Award	Roads	Won
2009	Washington Jewish Film Festival	Audience Award	Roads	Nominated
2010	International Documentary Association	IDA Award	The Heart of Jenin	Nominated
2010	News & Documentary Emmy Awards	Emmy	The Heart of Jenin	Nominated
2011	Nuremberg Film Festival "Turkey-Germany"	Ongoren Prize	The Heart of Jenin	Nominated
2019	Mammoth Film Festival	Audience Award	We Die Young	Nominated
2019	Mammoth Film Festival	Best Feature	We Die Young	Nominated
2019	Mammoth Film Festival	Grand Jury Award	We Die Young	Nominated
2019	Mammoth Film Festival	Best Screenplay	We Die Young	Nominated

== Filmography ==
Lior Geller has a catalogue of films and documentaries he produced, wrote and directed. The table below chronicles his filmography.

Year	Title	Role	Notes
2005	At the Green Line	Cinematographer	Documentary
2007	Roads	Director, Producer and Writer	Short
2008	The Heart of Jenin	Director, Writer	Documentary (as Leon Geller)
2009	Wide Angle	Director, Writer	TV series documentary (1 episode)
2010	Target: Happiness	Director	TV series (6 episodes)
2016	Hatched	Director	TV series (6 episodes)
2017	H1Z1: Fight for the Crown	Director, Editor, Musician (guitar)	TV mini-series
2019	We Die Young	Director, Writer, Editor	Feature Film
2025	The World Will Tremble	Director, Producer, Writer, Editor	Feature Film
