= Reich/Richter =

Reich/Richter is a collaborative work by American composer Steve Reich and German visual artist Gerhard Richter first performed in 2019. It was created as part of Richter and Corinna Belz "Moving Picture (946-3)" project. Reich's part in the work was to write a score for the film. The work was commissioned by the Los Angeles Philharmonic.
