= Edelweiss Pirates (film) =

2004 German film by Niko von Glasow

- Directed by: Niko von Glasow
- Screenplay by: Kiki von Glasow; Niko von Glasow
- Produced by: Daniel Brucher
- Starring: Ivan Stebunov; Bela B. Jochen Nickel; Anna Thalbach
- Cinematography: Jolanta Dylewska
- Edited by: Oli Weiss
- Music by: Andreas Schilling
- Production company: Palladio Film
- Release date: 2004
- Running time: 111 minutes
- Country: Germany
- Language: German

Edelweiss Pirates (German: Edelweisspiraten) is a 2004 German film directed by Niko von Glasow.

== Synopsis ==
Based on actual events, the film is set in 1944 and follows a group of Edelweiss Pirates, rebellious teenage German boys opposed to the war and Nazism. They become involved with an escaped convict who leads them into planning various acts of sabotage against the German war effort. This in turn brings them to the attention of the Gestapo.

== Cast ==
- Ivan Stebunov as Karl Ripke
- Bela B. as Hans Steinbrück
- Jochen Nickel as Josef Hoegen
- Anna Thalbach as Cilly Serve
- Jan Decleir as Ferdinand Kütter
- Simon Taal as Peter Ripke
- Jean Jülich as old Karl Ripke
