= NoBody's Perfect =

2008 documentary directed by Niko von Glasow

- Directed by: Niko von Glasow
- Written by: Niko von Glasow; Kiki von Glasow
- Produced by: Niko von Glasow; Ewa Borowski; Frank Henschke; Anne-Sophie Quancard
- Cinematography: Ania Dabrowska; Andreas Kohler
- Edited by: Mechthild Barth; Mathias Dombrink
- Production company: Palladio Film
- Release date: August 9, 2008 (Locarno Film Festival)
- Countries: Germany; United Kingdom
- Languages: German; English

NoBody's Perfect is a 2008 feature documentary produced and directed by Niko von Glasow. The film won the German Film Award for Best Documentary Film at the Deutscher Filmpreis in 2009, and has gone on to receive worldwide acclaim, resulting in a powerful campaign for the victims of thalidomide.

== About ==
NoBody's Perfect explores the specific problems which the twelve thalidomide victims faced during their lives, as well as their reaction to the film project.

== Production ==
The film was produced by Palladio Film.

During production, von Glasow attempted, unsuccessfully, to make contact with the chemical company Grünenthal, who produced the drug Thalidomide.

== Aftermath ==
Following the release and German Film Award in 2009, Niko went on to meet with various politicians and journalists. An effective campaign resulted in the German government's decision to raise monthly compensation (which could amount to over €2.5billion over the next 30 years) for the victims, many of whom continue to struggle in coping with their condition.

== See also ==
- Thalidomide!! A Musical
