= My Way to Olympia =

2013 German documentary

- Directed by: Niko von Glasow
- Produced by: Ingo Fliess
- Production company: Palladio Film
- Release date: 2013
- Countries: Germany; United Kingdom
- Languages: German; English

My Way to Olympia is a 2013 feature documentary produced and directed by Niko von Glasow, which follows disabled athletes preparing to compete at the London 2012 Paralympics. The film focuses on Matt Stutzman, an armless American archer; Norwegian table tennis player Aida Dahlen; the Rwandan sitting volleyball team; one-legged German swimmer Christiane Reppe and the tetraplegic Greek boccia player Greg Polychronidis. The film was produced by Palladio Film.

== Release ==
The film premiered at the 2013 Berlin Film Festival and was pre-nominated for the 2014 German Film Awards.
