= Peter Handke: In the Woods, Might Be Late =

- Directed by: Corinna Belz
- Written by: Corinna Belz
- Produced by: Thomas Kufus
- Cinematography: Nina Wesemann; Axel Schneppat; Piotr Rosolowski
- Edited by: Stephan Krumbiegel
- Production company: Zero one film
- Distributed by: Piffl Medien
- Release dates: August 2016 (Locarno); 10 November 2016
- Running time: 89 minutes
- Country: Germany
- Language: German

Peter Handke: In the Woods, Might Be Late (German: Peter Handke – Bin im Wald. Kann sein, dass ich mich verspäte...) is a 2016 German documentary film directed by Corinna Belz. It is about the Austrian writer Peter Handke and his home in Chaville, France. The film was shot over a period of more than three years.

== Release ==
The film premiered at the Locarno International Film Festival in August 2016. It was shown at the Hof International Film Festival on 26 October 2016 before being released in regular German cinemas on 10 November.

== Reception ==
Phillip Haibach wrote in Die Welt: "Corinna Belz can of course not show [Handke] in his actual profession, writing, only in monologue, in remembering the happiness of writing his first book in the then new retreat: 'That's how you inaugurate a house, not with some party.'" Haibach wrote that Belz successfully uses archive footage to avoid that the entire documentary becomes a celebration of a "cult of genius".
