= Thalidomide!! A Musical =

2005 British musical by Mat Fraser

- Music: Mat Fraser
- Lyrics: Mat Fraser
- Book: Mat Fraser
- Premiere: 2005: Battersea Arts Centre, London, UK

Thalidomide!! A Musical is a British musical written and composed by Mat Fraser, who was born with phocomelia as a result of the drug thalidomide being taken during his mother's pregnancy. Fraser and Anna Winslet play all the roles in the show.

The musical was developed with director Bill Bankes-Jones and premiered at the (London) Battersea Arts Centre's Octoberfest in 2005. It has since played across Britain and at festivals in Cardiff and Versailles, France.

The production tells the story of a love affair between Glyn, a thalidomide survivor (Fraser) and a non-disabled woman, Katie Crawford (Winslet), attracted by his phocomelia. Fraser calls the story a "cartoon version" of his own life. Winslet won the role in part because she did not shirk at an audition request to mimic Fraser himself.

== Musical numbers ==
- "Monster Babies"
- "I'll Be His Arms"
- "It's Hard to Hitch Down Life's Highway with No Thumbs"
- "Talk to the Flipper ('Cause the Face Don't Care)"

== Reception ==
The Daily Telegraph summarised the show as "sharp and original, but not for the squeamish". One Wolverhampton councillor, Malcolm Gwinnett, criticised the show, arguing that, "To exploit people in this way is, frankly, sick", while Fraser said that, "It makes Jerry Springer look tame".

== See also ==
- NoBody's Perfect, a 2009 documentary film
