= Corinna Belz =

German documentary filmmaker

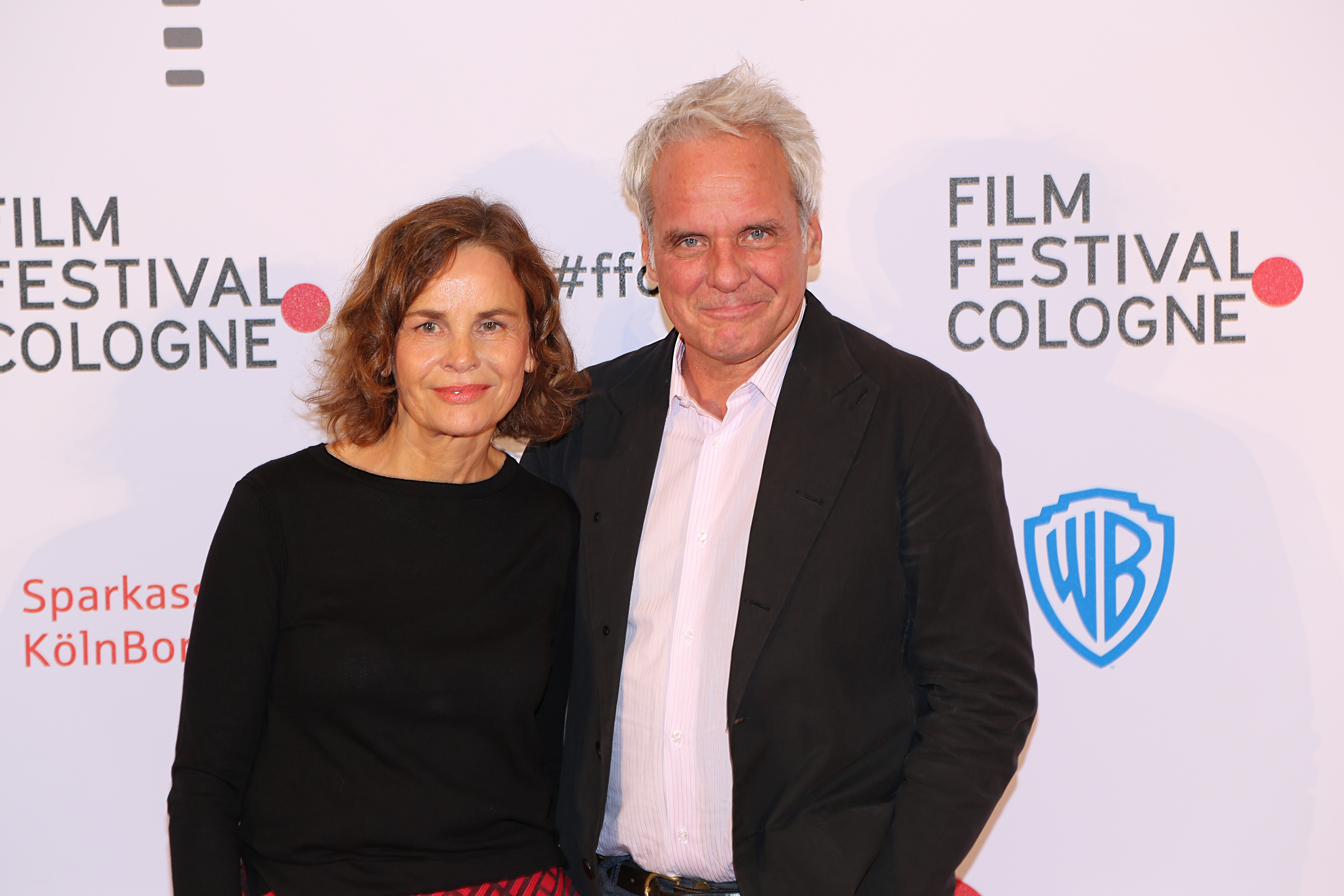
Corinna Belz and the producer Thomas Kufus, 2017

Corinna Belz is a German documentary filmmaker. She is known for the films Gerhard Richter Painting (2011), Peter Handke: In the Woods, Might Be Late (2016) and Inside the Uffizi (2021).

== Life and career ==
Corinna Belz studied philosophy, art history and media studies in Cologne and Berlin.

After her first film about Gerhard Richter's Cologne Cathedral Window (2007), Belz made the feature-length documentary Gerhard Richter Painting (2011). In 2017, Richter and Belz developed the abstract film Moving Picture (946-3), for which Steve Reich wrote the composition "Reich/Richter". The piece was performed in New York City in 2019 by Ensemble Signal, at the Barbican Centre in London, Philharmonie de Paris and other European venues. Performances at the Walker Art Center, Soundstream Festival Toronto, Walt Disney Concert Hall and by the London Sinfonietta to follow in 2023. For an exhibition in Kyoto summer 2019, the British composer Rebecca Saunders created the composition "Moving Picture (946-3) Kyoto Version" in collaboration with trumpeter Marco Blaauw. The project was performed at the Musikfest Berlin 2021 and at Tholey Abbey for the inauguration of Richter's new church windows.

Belz worked as a director on the TV series 24 Hours Berlin, 24h Jerusalem, and 24h Bayern produced by the Berlin production company zero one.

From 2019 to 2020 Belz made the feature-length documentary Inside the Uffizi in Florence, Italy.

Belz’ feature-length documentary I Am Not Alone about the German sculptor Thomas Schuette had a theatrical release and toured international Film Festivals in 2023.

== Accolades ==
Belz received the 2012 German Film Award for Best Documentary Film for Gerhard Richter Painting. She received the 2017 Filmpreis NRW and was nominated for the 2018 Grimme-Preis for Peter Handke: In the Woods, Might Be Late, about the writer Peter Handke.

== Personal life ==
Belz has a son and a daughter and lives in Cologne and Berlin.

== Selected filmography ==
- 24 Hours Berlin (2009, collaborative work)
- Gerhard Richter Painting (2011)
- Peter Handke: In the Woods, Might Be Late (2016)
- Inside the Uffizi (2021, co-directed with Enrique Sánchez Lansch)
- I Am Not Alone (2023)
