= Al-Kasaba Theatre =

Cinema in Ramallah, Palestine

Coordinates: 31°54′8.89″N 35°12′14.12″E

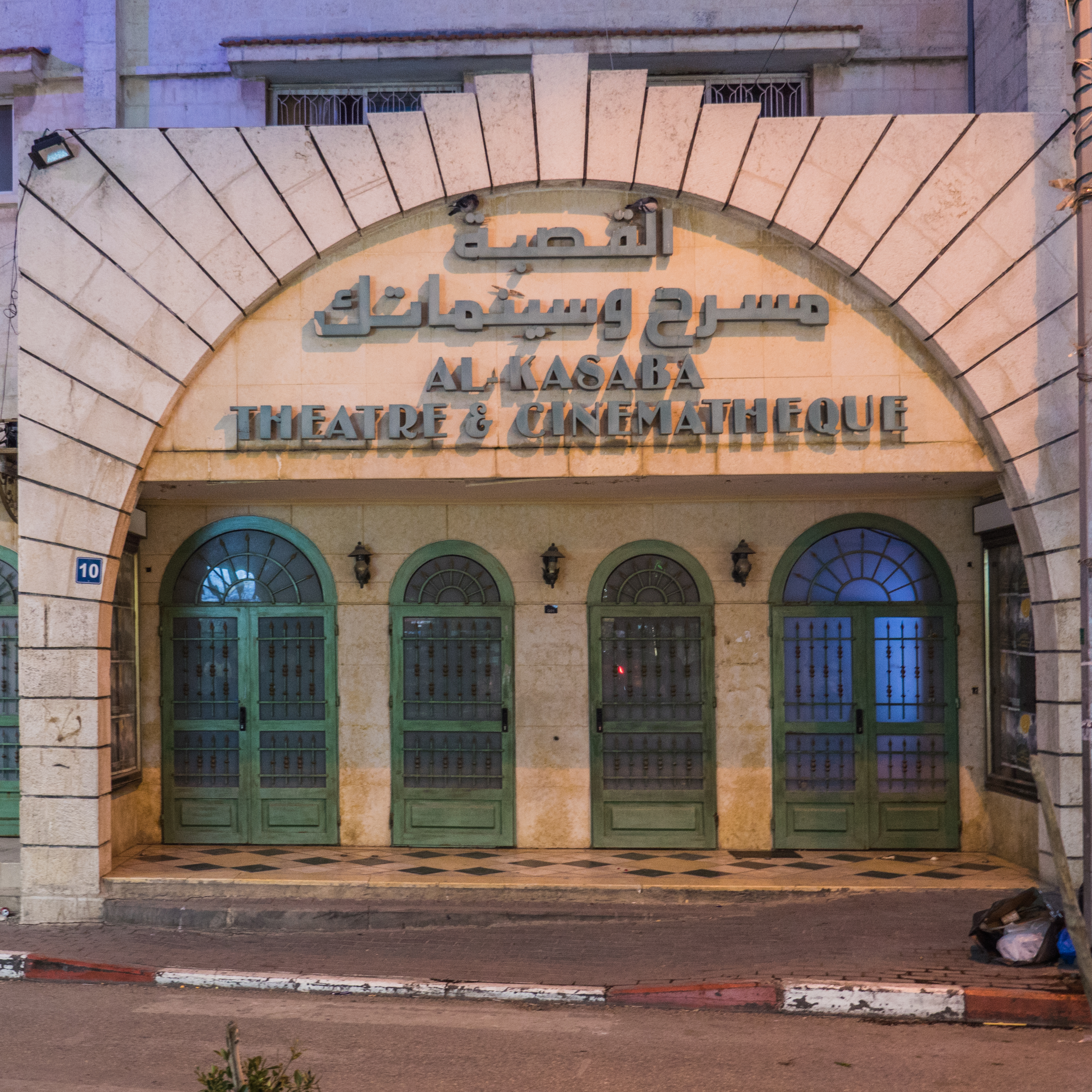
Al-Kasaba Theatre and Cinematheque

Al-Kasaba Theatre and Cinematheque (Arabic: القصبة مسرح وسينماتك) is a theatre and a cinémathèque in the city of Ramallah, West Bank, Palestine. It was established in Jerusalem in 1970 during Israeli occupation. In 2000 Al Kasaba was established in Ramallah as a theatre and a cinema.

== History ==
Al-Kasaba was originally established in Jerusalem in 1970 as the Theatre Arts Group. In 1984, it was renamed Shawk Theatre. In 1989 it was renovated to host films. In 1998, the renovation of Al-Jameel Cinema in Ramallah, which closed-down in 1987, became Al Kasaba Theatre and Cinematheque. The cinema opened in 2000 and is one of the few venues in the region that allows Palestinian artists, actors and filmmakers to produce and present their productions.

Early 2002 the theatre hosted Nobel Prize in Literature laureates Wole Soyinka and Jose Saramago. A few weeks later, during the April 2002 invasion of Ramallah, the theatre was targeted by the Israeli army. The offices of the theatre were ransacked, and files and computers destroyed.

== See also ==
- Palestinian National Theatre
- Cinema Jenin
