= Allenby Street bus bombing =

2012 suicide attack in Tel Aviv, Israel

- Part of the Second Intifada militancy campaign
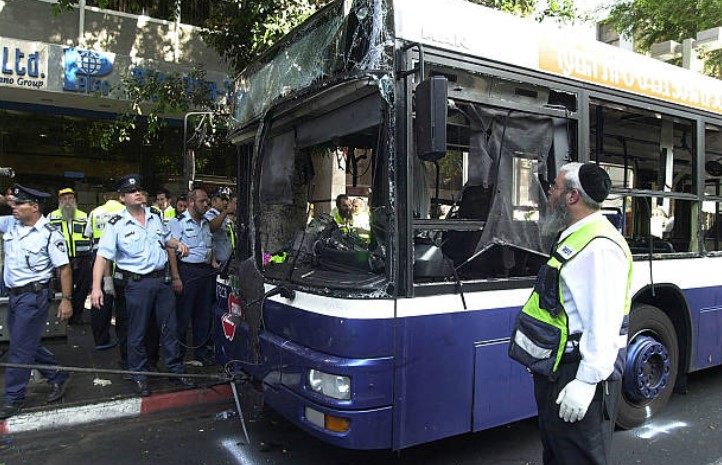
- The attack aftermath

- The attack site
- Location: 32°03′53″N 34°46′21″E; Tel Aviv, Israel
- Date: 19 September 2002 c. 13:00
- Attack type: Suicide bombing
- Deaths: 6 civilians (+1 bomber)
- Injuries: ≈ 70
- Perpetrator: Hamas claimed responsibility

The Allenby Street bus bombing was a Palestinian suicide bombing that occurred on 19 September 2002 on a Dan bus in the center of Tel Aviv's business district. Six civilians were killed in the attack and approximately 70 were injured. Hamas claimed responsibility for the attack.

== The attack ==
Shortly before 13:00 on Thursday, 19 September 2002, a Palestinian suicide bomber blew himself up at the front part of a crowded bus in the heart Tel Aviv's business district. The attack was carried out on Dan commuter bus No. 4 as the bus was passing through Allenby Street in front of the Great Synagogue of Tel Aviv. Six people were killed and approximately 70 were injured in the attack.

The Palestinian Islamist militant organization Hamas claimed responsibility for the attack.

Photos from the attack scene

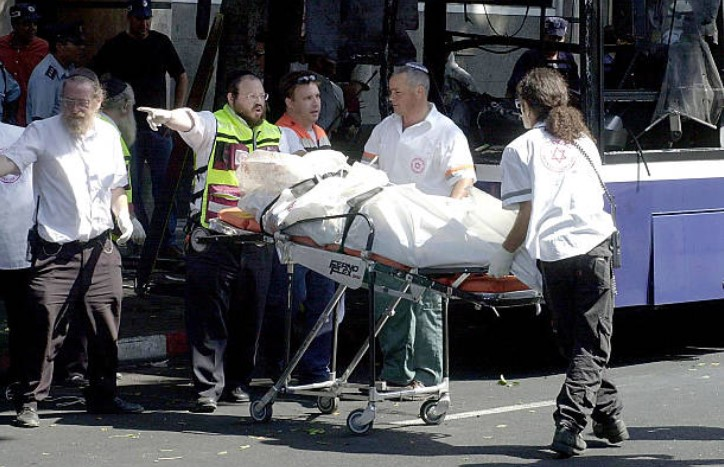
MDA and ZAKA personnel evacuating a victim.

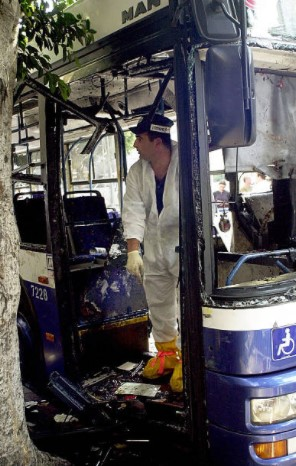
Israeli Police forensic officer inside the bus.

== Aftermath ==
=== Israeli retaliation ===
The Israeli government accused Yasser Arafat and the Palestinian leadership of involvement in the Second Intifada militancy campaign and in illegal arms trafficking. After an emergency meeting of the security cabinet, convened in wake of the bombing, Israel launched a military operation in the West Bank in which tanks and armored vehicles began a siege on the compound of Yasser Arafat in Ramallah. Arafat was besieged in the Mukataa compound for close to two years until his departure to a hospital in Paris in October 2004. Much of the Mukataa was destroyed by the IDF in the course of the siege.

=== Organ donation ===
Among the victims was Yoni Jesner, a Jewish teenager who attended Har Etzion yeshiva in Gush Etzion. Jesner sustained a critical head injury, and his parents signed their consent to detaching him from life support and donating his organs. Yasmin Abu Ramila, a 7-year old Palestinian girl from East Jerusalem, was the recipient of his kidney. The surgery was successful and Yasmin reportedly has a very good chance of living a normal life. The story was widely reported due to the circumstances and Jesner's organ being donated to a child on the opposite side of the conflict.

== Official reactions ==
=== Involved parties ===
Israel: Israeli officials stated that the attack indicated that the Palestinian leadership was still unable or unwilling to rein in militants attacking Israeli targets.

Palestinian territories:

- Palestinian National Authority - PNA officials condemned the attack and asked all Palestinian groups to denounce it.
- Hamas spokesman Ismail Abu Shanab stated that he expected to see "a series of operations against the Zionist enemy, as a result of the daily brutal crimes against our people."

=== International ===
- USA – At a meeting in the Oval Office US President George Bush strongly condemned the attack and stated that "All parties must do everything they can to reject and stop violence"

=== Supranational ===
- European Union – EU officials called on Israel to show restraint, suggesting that a harsh Israeli reprisal for the terrorist attack in Tel Aviv, which was claimed by Arafat's opponents, would ruin efforts made to reform the Palestinian National Authority and to secure a ceasefire between the parties.

== See also ==
- Yoni Jesner and Ahmed Khatib
