= Niko von Glasow =

German film director and producer (born 1960)

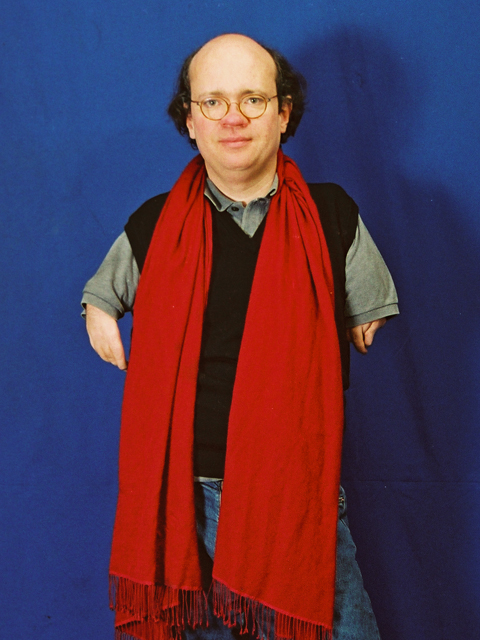
- Born: 1960 (age 64–65); Cologne, West Germany
- Occupations: Film director; producer
- Years active: 1990–present
- Website: http://www.nikovonglasow.org

Niko von Glasow (né Brücher; born 1960) is a German film director and producer. He is the founder and artistic director of Palladio Film and the founder of the Niko von Glasow Foundation.

Von Glasow began his training with Rainer Werner Fassbinder and then worked for many film directors including Georg Stefan Troller, Hellmuth Costard, Alexander Kluge, Peter Zadek and Jean-Jacques Annaud before going on to study film at New York University and at the National Film School in Łódź, Poland.

In 2008, he produced and directed the feature documentary "NoBody's Perfect", which follows von Glasow as he looks for eleven people who, like him, were born disabled due to the disastrous side effects of thalidomide, and who are prepared to pose nude for a calendar of photos. The film won the German Film Award for Best Documentary at the Deutscher Filmpreis in 2009 and received worldwide acclaim. Through the film's worldwide success, von Glasow met with various politicians and journalists. An effective campaign resulted in the German government's decision to raise monthly compensation (which will amount to over €2.7 billion over the next 30 years) for the 2,700 surviving victims of thalidomide in Germany.

In 2014 he bought Villa Pozzolo in Tuscany and turned it into a cultural centre. In the summer, he rents Villa Pozzolo out to support his foundation, the nikovonglasow.org foundation. The foundation helps more than 1000 children and adults with a disability to get surgery, access to education and food. The foundation is organising the surgery for 400 disabled children in North Vietnam.

He is working as a life, financial, and story coach. The fee for his work as a coach also goes straight to the foundation.

== Career ==
Following his studies at the National Film School in Łódź, Poland, von Glasow made his first feature film, "Wedding Guests", which won the German Critic's Prize at the Berlin Film Festival. His other projects include "Maries's Song" starring Sylvie Testud (which won three German Film Awards), "Edelweiss Pirates" which starred Bela B., Jan Decleir and Anna Thalbach, and Winter Sleepers which Tom Tykwer directed and von Glasow co-produced.

In 2008, von Glasow convinced 11 other victims of thalidomide to strip naked for a calendar photoshoot. NoBody's Perfect, the documentary about the making of this calendar, won the German Film Award and resulted in a campaign for the victims of thalidomide. His next film, "Everything Will Be Alright", documents the making of a unique live theatre production, which von Glasow wrote and developed. The film goes behind the scenes of the play and features a cast of physically and mentally disabled actors.

Von Glasow's latest film, "Shoot Me. Kiss Me. Cut!" depicts twelve young filmmakers trying to achieve fame and fortune with their version of Romeo and Juliet.

Von Glasow is a member of BAFTA as well as the European Film Academy and the German Film Academy.

Von Glasow is a motivational speaker all over the world. He holds workshops in script writing and directing internationally. Von Glasow also runs a charity for girls' education and the arts, working chiefly in East Asia.

== Personal life ==
Von Glasow is the son of Majella Neven DuMont and Ernst Brücher, the founder of the M. DuMont Schauberg Publishing house in Cologne.

He currently lives in Cologne and Italy.

== Selected filmography ==
- In Development: Girl From Tibet
- 2015: Shoot Me. Kiss Me. Cut!
- 2013: My Way to Olympia
- 2008: Everything Will Be Alright
- 2008: NoBody's Perfect
- 2008: Look At Me
- 2004: Edelweiss Pirates
- 2004: Elke Heidenreich, a documentary about Elke Heidenreich
- 1997: Wintersleeper
- 1994: Marie's Song
- 1991: Wedding Guests
