= Maryam Zaree =

German actress and director (born 1983)

- Born: July 22, 1983 (age 43); Evin prison, Tehran, Iran

Maryam Zaree (born 22 July 1983) is an Iranian-German actress, film director and screenwriter.

== Life ==
Zaree was born in 1983 in Evin Prison, a political prison in Tehran; both of her parents were inmates due to political dissidence. When Zaree was two, she and her mother left Iran for Frankfurt, Germany, where she grew up. Her father was released after seven years while waiting for the death penalty, and she finally met him when she was 10. She studied acting at Potsdam-Babelsberg Film University.

Her 2019 directorial debut, the documentary film Born In Evin, follows Zaree's exploration of her birth in Iran. It was screened in over 40 countries and won the Berlinale's Kompass-Perspekktive Award and the German Film Award for Best Documentary Film 2020.

== Bibliography ==
- Kluge Gefühle (play)

== Filmography ==
=== Films ===
Year	Film	Role	Notes
2018	Transit	Melissa	
2019	Systemsprenger		
2019	Born in Evin		Director
2020	Undine	Monika	

=== Television ===
- Doppelhaushälfte
- Legal Affairs
- 4 Blocks

== Awards and recognition ==
Year	Award	Category	Work	Result	Ref
2017	Schiller Memorial Prize		Kluge Gefühle	Won	
2017	Heidelberger Stückemarkt		Kluge Gefühle	Won	
2018	Grimme Prize		4 Blocks	Won	
2019	Berlinale	Compass-Perspektive Award	Born in Evin	Won	
2020	German Film Award	Best Documentary Film	Born in Evin	Won	
