= We Die Young (film) =

- Directed by: Lior Geller
- Screenplay by: Lior Geller
- Story by: Andrew Friedman
- Produced by: Moshe Diamant; Sagiv Diamant; Gabriel Georgiev
- Starring: Jean-Claude Van Damme; David Castañeda; Elijah Rodriguez.
- Cinematography: Ivan Vatsov
- Edited by: Lior Geller; Tal Keller
- Music by: Erez Koskas
- Release date: March 1, 2019 (US)
- Running time: 92 minutes
- Countries: United States; Bulgaria
- Language: English
- Budget: $4 million

We Die Young is a 2019 American direct-to-video action film directed by Lior Geller, and starring Jean-Claude Van Damme, David Castañeda, and Elijah Rodriguez.

== Summary story ==
Lucas, a 14-year-old boy inducted into the gang life in Washington, D.C., is determined that his 10-year-old brother will not follow the same path. When an Afghanistan war veteran comes into the neighborhood, an opportunity arises.

== Cast ==
- Elijah Rodriguez as Lucas
- Jean-Claude Van Damme as Daniel
- David Castañeda as Rincon
- Nicholas Sean Johnny as Miguel
- Charlie MacGechan as Jester
- Joana Metrass as Anna
- Dean John-Wilson as Mousey
- Jim Caesar as Fellx
- Kerry Bennett as Brenda
- Jacob Scipio as Tomas
- Joseph Long as Luis
- Gary Beadle as Winslow

== Reception ==
Common Sense Media rated the film 2 out of 5 stars.

Simon Abrams of Roger Ebert.com rated it 2 stars, saying "We Die Young follows a poorly defined audience surrogate, one who does what he's told without ever really standing apart from his guardians."

James Lindorf of Red Carpet Crash praised the direction and the performance of lead actor Jean-Claude Van Damme.

John Delia of Aced Magazine gave the film 4 out of 5 stars calling the film “Shocking, violent and emotional…” stating of director Lior Geller's work, “Geller… sets up the audience for a front row seat on a Godfather resembling movie.” "
