= More than Honey =

2012 Swiss documentary film by Markus Imhoof

- Film poster
- Directed by: Markus Imhoof
- Written by: Markus Imhoof; Kerstin Hoppenhaus
- Produced by: Helmut Grasser; Markus Imhoof; Thomas Kufus; Pierre-Alain Meier
- Starring: Fred Jaggi
- Release date: 11 August 2012
- Running time: 95 minutes
- Country: Switzerland
- Languages: German; English; Mandarin Chinese

More than Honey is a 2012 Swiss documentary film directed by Markus Imhoof about honeybee colonies in California, Switzerland, China and Australia. The film was submitted for the Oscar for Best Foreign Language Film at the 86th Academy Awards, but it was not nominated.

== Cast ==
- Fred Jaggi
- Prof. Dr. Randolf Menzel
- John Miller
- Liane Singer
- Heidrun Singer
- Zhao Su Zhang
- Fred Terry
- Prof. Dr. Boris Baer
- Elisabeth Schild

== Reception ==
More than Honey received an approval rating of 100% on Rotten Tomatoes based on 40 reviews, with a weighted average of 7.2/10. The website's critical consensus states: "A rare advocacy documentary that fully trusts its subject's ability to fascinate, More Than Honey enlightens without badgering – and is all the more effective for it". It also has a rating of 70% on Metacritic, based on 15 critics, indicating "generally favorable reviews".

Bumblebee researcher Felicity Muth called the film "visually magnificent." Stephen Holden, writing for The New York Times, calls the cinematography "spectacularly beautiful," and calls the film "a fascinating but rambling documentary." Peter Bradshaw, writing for The Guardian, gave the movie three stars out of five and called it an "interestingly laidback film", opining that, "Imhoof seems disconcertingly untroubled" about the ecological challenges currently facing bees.

== See also ==
- List of submissions to the 86th Academy Awards for Best Foreign Language Film
- List of Swiss submissions for the Academy Award for Best Foreign Language Film
