= Royston Maldoom =

British choreographer

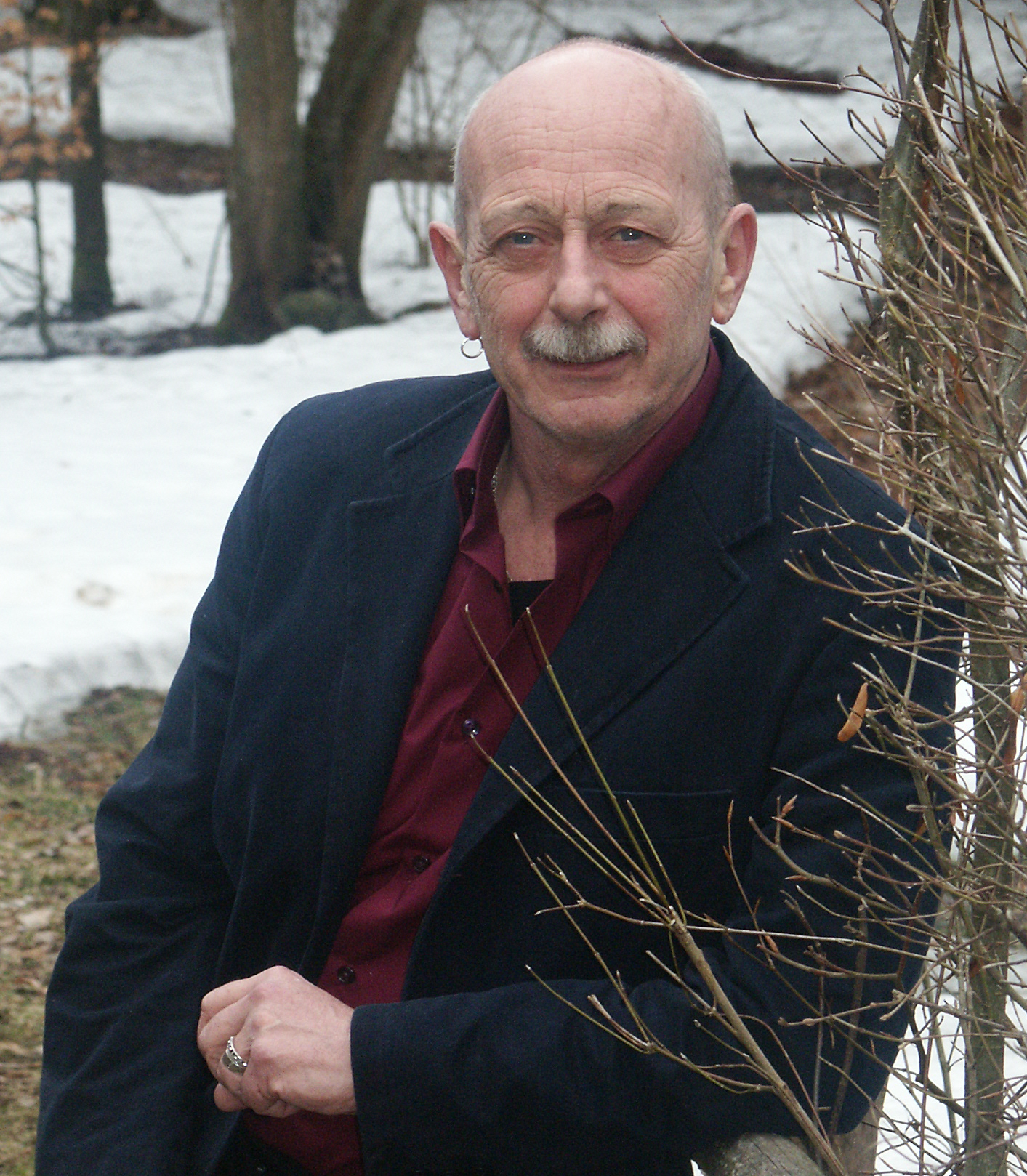
Royston Maldoom

Royston Maldoom, OBE (born 1943) is a British choreographer whose works, including Adagietto and Ursprung, have been performed for various dance companies, such as The Jefferson Dancers and Dance Theatre of Harlem.

== Dance, choreography and community dance ==
Royston Maldoom's career as a choreographer began in 1972 when he received a major Gulbenkian Foundation award for his work in a Royal Ballet workshop, he had previously been studying dance with Hilde Holger. Since then he has created works for companies in Britain and abroad, including Dance Theatre of Harlem (New York), 'Atlanta Contemporary Dance Company' (Georgia USA), 'Ballet San Marcos' (Peru), 'Irish Ballet Company' (Cork, Republic of Ireland), 'Northern Ballet Theatre' (Manchester UK), 'EMMA Dance Company' (Leicestershire UK), Scottish Ballet (Glasgow UK) for whom, in collaboration with Graham Bowers, he created 'Ursprung'.

In 1975 his small group, 'Mercury Dance Company', won first prize at the 7th International Choreographic Competition at Bagnolet in Paris, and was subsequently awarded the 'Foundation of France' prize for choreographer and company.

Maldoom was appointed 'Dance Artist in Residence' jointly by Fife and Tayside Regional Councils in January 1981. The year's residency with financial support from the Scottish Arts Council, was the first of its kind to cover an area rather than a single institution, and through his unique and unconventional approach to dance successfully encouraged participation and interest in dance within communities, with performance workshops and classes, on a scale not seen before.

He was responsible with others in forming Dundee Repertory Dance Theatre and in his role as Artistic Director, established a solid, successful and ongoing base for professional contemporary dance in Scotland. He also maintained his commitment to community dance by setting up annual summer projects, where people within the community regardless of age and experience, could participate in a work that culminated in a performance to commissioned music and stage design at a professional venue. One such work was ‘Bivouac’ where Gordon McPherson wrote the musical score and Graham Bowers designed the costumes and stage set. The company was renamed several years later and adopted the name Scottish Dance Theatre, after the closure of Peter Royston's original company of the same name.

From 1990 to 1997, he served as choreographic director of the European Youth Dance Festival in Duisburg. In his first year, he staged Carmina Burana at the Mercatorhalle in Duisburg in collaboration with artistic director Ulla Weltike; later, he also staged Le Sacre du Printemps.

In a projects with the Berlin Philharmonic in the first season of Simon Rattle as chief conductor, he trained 250 children from public schools Stravinsky's Le Sacre du printemps. It was performed in January 2003, and documented in Rhythm Is It!.

He also came to NYC in 2007 and worked with four inner city schools to reproduce the Rite of Spring dance with the Berlin Philharmonic. (Twelve students from PS 161 in West Harlem as well as two Harlem high schools & six students from an elementary school were the dance performers.)

== Dance United ==
In 1996, Dance United founders Andrew Coggins, Mags Byrne and Royston Maldoom, together with the Ethiopian Gemini Trust, created a unique dance project in Addis Ababa with street children which led to the foundation of the Adugna Community Dance Theatre Company. In 2000, Dance United was officially established.

Trained intensively over many years in Addis Ababa by dance artists from all over the world, eighteen young Ethiopian dancers graduated in 2002 with accreditation from Middlesex University (UK). In 2004, Junaid Jemal Sendi won the international Rolex Young Choreographer award, the first ever African artist to win this prestigious accolade. Junaid and fellow Adugna dancer, Addisu Demissie, also played key roles in Dance United's DESTINO at Sadler's Wells in 2009.

== Books ==
- Maldoom, Royston; Carley, Jacalyn (15 March 2010). Tanz um dein Leben: Meine Arbeit, meine Geschichte. FISCHER E-Books. ISBN 978-3-10-400710-6.
