= Deutsche Filmakademie =

German film organization

- Deutsche Filmakademie e.V.
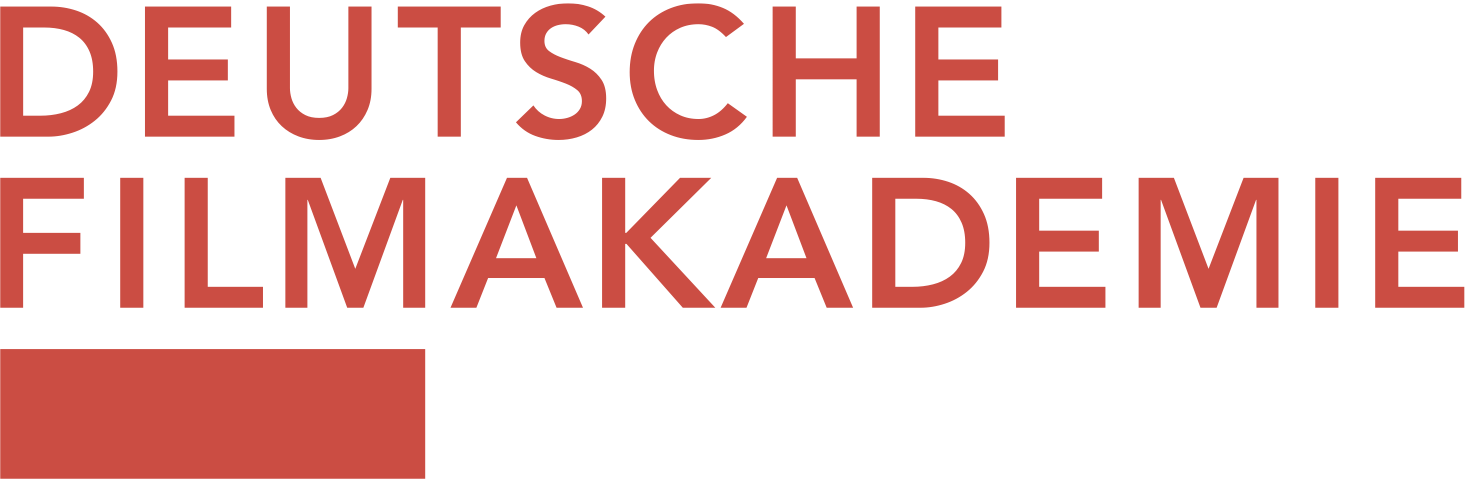
- Formation: 2003
- Founded at: Berlin, Germany
- Type: Independent association
- Members: 2,200 (2022)
- Website: deutsche-filmakademie.de

The Deutsche Filmakademie is a German independently run organization with a focus on filmmaking.

== History ==
The academy was founded in 2003 in Berlin, on the initiative of Helmut Dietl, Bernd Eichinger, and Ulrich Felsberg. It initially comprised 100 members— and was intended as a way to provide native filmmakers a forum for discussion and a way to promote the reputation of German cinema through publications, presentations, discussions, and regular promotion of the subject in schools.

Since 2005, the winners of the Deutscher Filmpreis (colloquially known as the Lolas) have been elected by members of the Deutsche Filmakademie.

In 2007, a group of academy critics—including filmmakers Hans-Christian Schmid, Andres Veiel, and Hans Weingartner, several film festival directors, and the German association of film critics—opened talks with German culture minister Bernd Neumann, in an effort to return to the previous system and have politicians and critics, not academy members, decide who gets the Lolas.

In 2008, the academy's internet service 24 – Das Wissensportal der Deutschen Filmakademie was launched. The portal provides an insight into the creation of a movie, with the hope of making the work of independent filmmakers more transparent and accountable.

The Deutsche Filmakademie is not to be confused with the 1938 Deutsche Filmakademie, founded in Babelsberg.

== Membership ==
The academy is financed by membership dues of full members, honorary members, associate members, and friends. Full members must be recommended by at least two filmmakers who have applied for full membership and have been accepted. All winners of the Deutscher Filmpreis automatically get a full membership. Honorary members are appointed for their contributions to German film. Supporting members are companies and legal persons from the film industry.

== Governance ==
=== Presidents ===
- 2003–2010: Senta Berger
- 2003–2010: Günter Rohrbach
- 2010–2013: Bruno Ganz
- 2010–2019: Iris Berben
- 2019–2022: Ulrich Matthes
- 2022–present: Florian Gallenberger
- 2022–present: Alexandra Maria Lara

=== Board chairs ===
- 2003–2009: Stefan Arndt (deputies: Michael Ballhaus, Katharina Thalbach)
- 2009–2015: Thomas Kufus
- 2015–present: Benjamin Herrmann

== See also ==
- German cinema
