= Anna Thalbach =

German actress

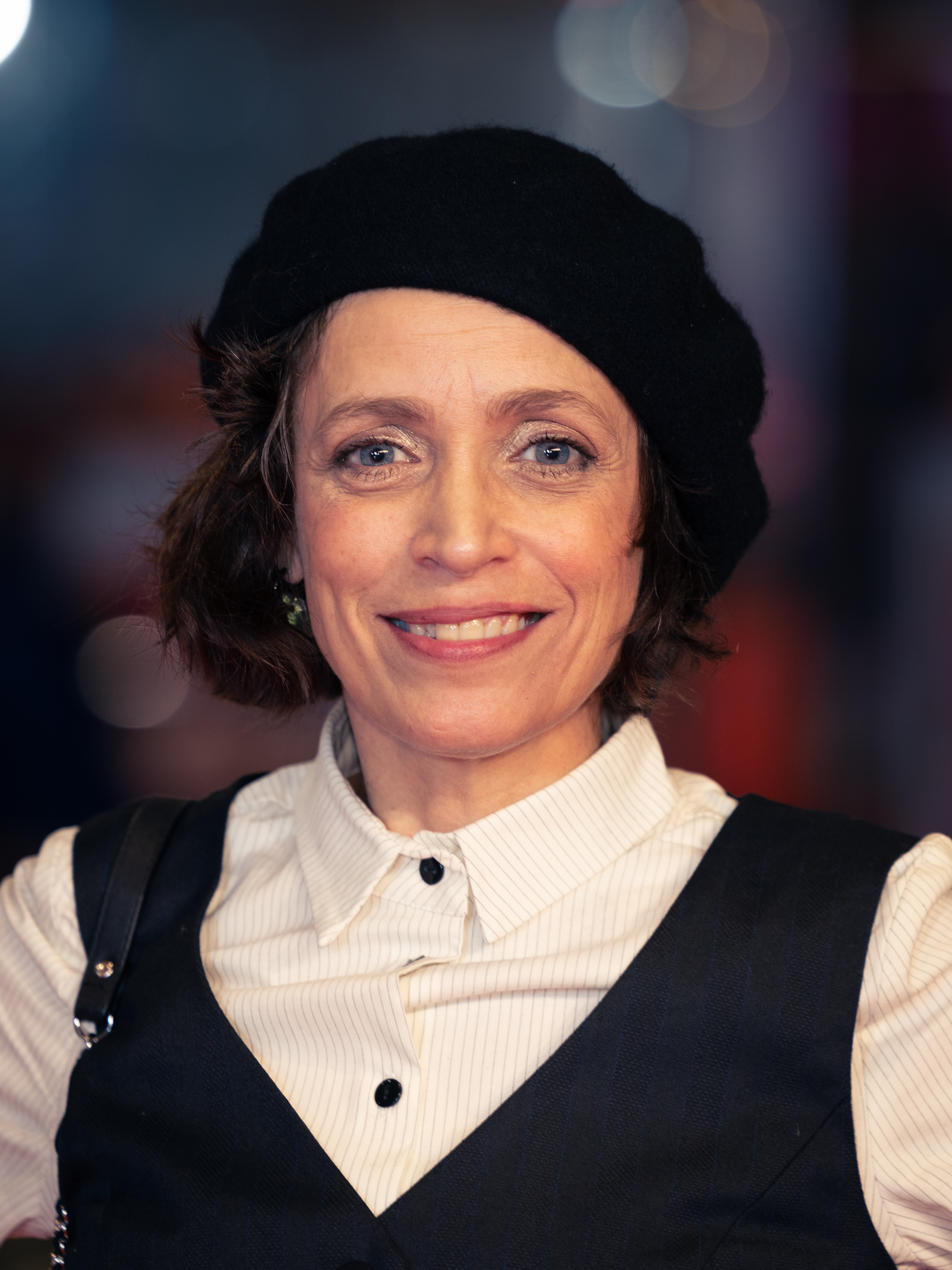
- Thalbach in 2025
- Born: 1 June 1973 (age 52); East Berlin, East Germany
- Occupation: Actress
- Children: 1

Anna Maria Joachim genannt Thalbach (born 1 June 1973), known as Anna Maria Thalbach, is a German actress. Her mother, Katharina Thalbach, is also an actress. Her daughter Nellie is an actress as well. In 2002, she was in Alexander Pfeuffer's short film Breakfast?.

== Selected filmography ==
Year	Title	Role	Notes
1990	Herzlich willkommen	Iris	
1992	Andy	Rita	TV film
1993	Justice	Helene Kohler	
1994	Mesmer	Francisca	
1994	Burning Life	Lisa Herzog	
1997	Nackt im Cabrio	Verena	TV film
1999	Oskar and Leni	Leni	
1999	Girls Under Investigation	Stella	
2002	FeardotCom	Kate	
2004	Vinzent	Lena Wildner	
2004	Edelweiss Pirates	Cilly Serve	
2004	Downfall	Hanna Reitsch	
2006	Esperanza	Anna	
2008	The Reason Why	Helena	
2008	Krabat	Worschula	
2010	Carlos	Inge Viett	
2011	A Dangerous Method	Bathtub Patient	
2011	No Sex Is No Option	Paule	TV film
2012	Friedrich – Ein deutscher König	Frederick II (young)	TV film
2012	The Marriage Swindler and His Wife	Cornelia Krugschenk	TV film
