= Rhythm Is It! =

2004 film by Enrique Sánchez Lansch

- Directed by: Thomas Grube; Enrique Sánchez Lansch
- Starring: Simon Rattle; Royston Maldoom
- Cinematography: René Dame; Marcus Winterbauer
- Release dates: 12 June 2004 (Sydney Film Festival); 16 September 2004 (Germany)
- Running time: 100:00
- Country: Germany
- Language: German

Rhythm Is It! is a 2004 German documentary film directed by Thomas Grube and Enrique Sánchez Lansch. The film documents a project undertaken by conductor Simon Rattle and choreographer Royston Maldoom to stage a performance of Stravinsky's Le Sacre du printemps (The Rite of Spring) with a cast of 250 children recruited from Berlin's public schools. The choreographer inspired the young people from 25 countries in demanding rehearsals to work seriously and act as an ensemble, overcoming obstacles and frustration, and to find self-confidence based on body perception. A successful performance was given for 3000 spectators in the Berlin Treptow Arena in January 2003.

== Film ==
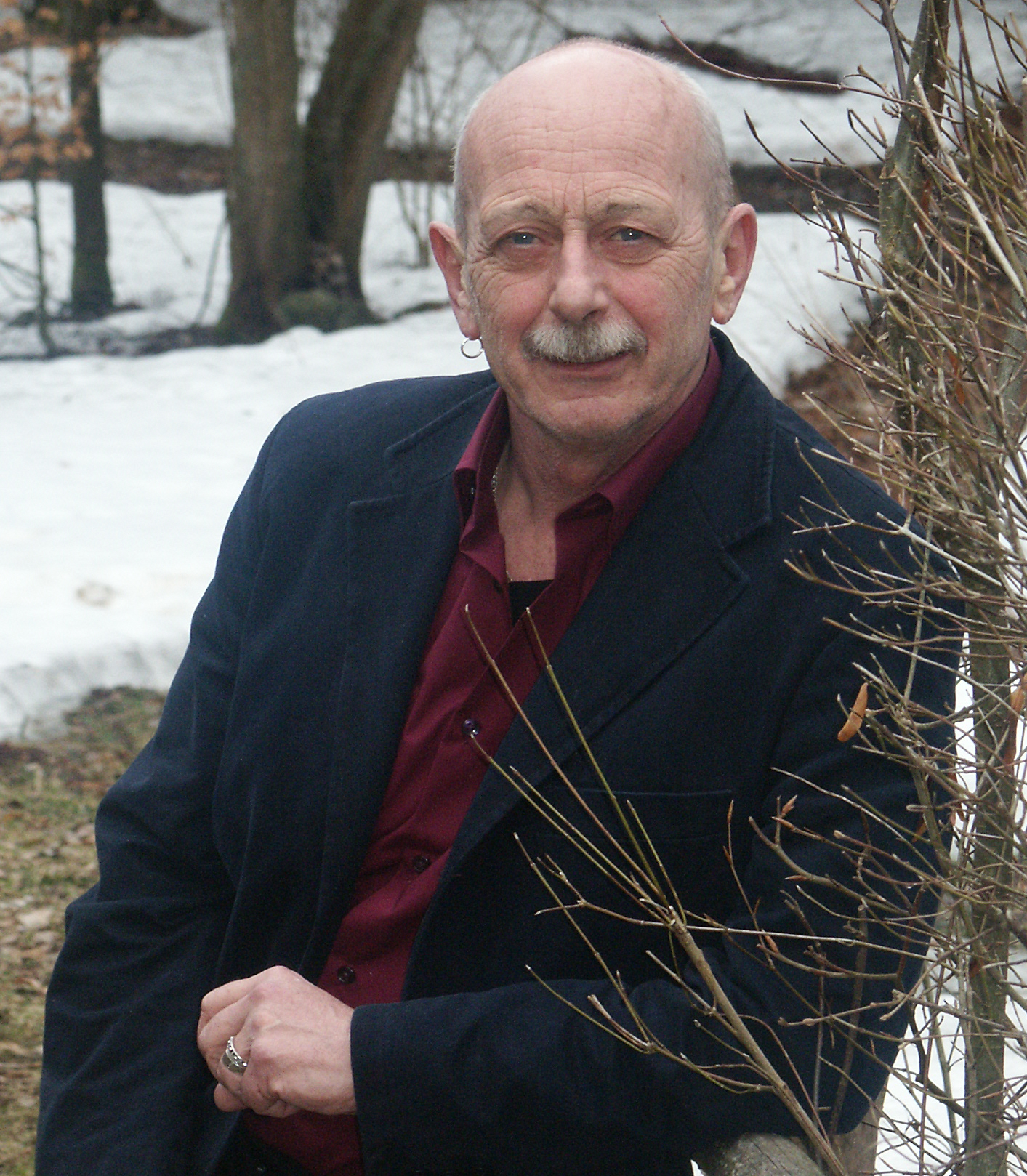
Royston Maldoom, the ballet master

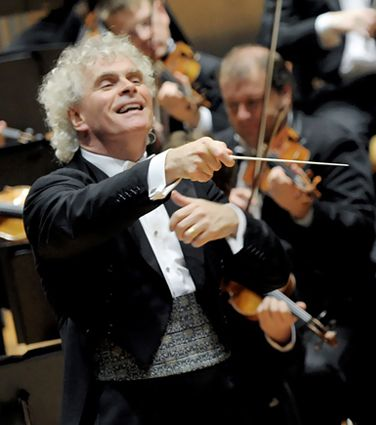
Simon Rattle in 2006

In 2002/03, Simon Rattle's first season as chief conductor of the Berlin Philharmonic, he initiated a project to stage Stravinsky's ballet Le Sacre du printemps (The Rite of Spring) in a live performance played by the orchestra, and danced by 250 children and young adults from 25 countries who had no experience in dance. It was the orchestra's first Education Project.

The film by Thomas Grube and Enrique Sánchez Lansch shows the rehearsals of the young dancers with choreographer Royston Maldoom and his team, the social background of selected dancers, part of the performance and the joy afterwards. The choreographer, who has thirty years of experience in large projects like this, and Susannah Broughton, his assistant, demand much from the young people, provoking dedication and discipline which is new to many of them. The ballet master questions that everything should always be fun ("Warum muss alles immer Spaß machen"), a common concept of education at the time, and tells the young people that dance is serious, and he always enjoyed searching for the seriousness of dance ("ist eine ernsthafte Sache. Ich hatte immer Freude daran, nach dem Ernst des Tanzes zu suchen!"). During six weeks of rehearsals, he tried to encourage the young people to delve into themselves, perceiving themselves, to overcome anxieties, and to find a new self-confidence based on body perception. At times, teachers were irritated and tried to protect their students from overstraining.

The documentary shows how the multi-cultural group of students became an ensemble acting with dedication. Three young people appear in interviews and with social background, Marie, Martin and Olayinka. Marie, 15 years old, tries to pass school exams; Olayinka, age 16, is a war-orphan from Nigeria who arrived recently; and Martin, age 19, is fighting his inhibitions. They discover new potentials in the dance which leads them to new hidden worlds. Rattle is filmed in rehearsals with the orchestra. The film documents the opening of the orchestra to society. After the successful performance for 3000 spectators in the Berlin Treptow Arena in January 2003, the young dancers appear full of joy, "We did it"! ("Wir haben's geschafft!"), having overcome obstacles and frustrations.

== Reception ==
A reviewer noted that the film is a convincing voice for art and education ("ein überzeugendes Plädoyer für Kunst und Erziehung"), seeing culture not as a luxury but as a necessity that creates meaning, and seeing education not as a collection of prescriptions, but as "birth assistance" for becoming human ("...sondern als Notwendigkeit, die Sinn schafft; Erziehung, nicht als Sammlung von Rezepten, sondern als "Geburtshilfe" zur Menschwerdung"), and recommended it to all pedagogues.

== Release ==
In Germany the film was released in theatres in September 2004. The film also won several prizes, including two for Best Editing and Best Documentary at the 2005 German Film Awards.

== Awards ==
| Year | Awarding Body | Award | Nominee(s) | Result |
|---|---|---|---|---|
| 2005 | Bavarian Film Awards | Best Documentary | Thomas Grube; Enrique Sánchez Lansch | Won |
| 2005 | German Film Awards | Best Editing | Dirk Grau; Martin Hoffmann | Won |
| 2005 | German Film Awards | Best Documentary | Uwe Dierks; Thomas Grube; Andrea Thilo | Won |
