= The Heart of Jenin =

- Directed by: Marcus Vetter, Leon Geller
- Written by: Marcus Vetter, Leon Geller
- Produced by: Ernst Ludwig Ganzert, Ulli Pfau
- Cinematography: Nadav Hekselmann
- Edited by: Saskia Metten
- Music by: Erez Koskas
- Release date: 2008
- Running time: 89 minutes
- Country: Germany
- Languages: English, Hebrew and Arabic with German subtitles

The Heart of Jenin is a 2008 documentary film written and directed by Marcus Vetter and Leon Geller. The film tells the story of Ismael Khatib from Jenin, a Palestinian whose son was shot by Israeli soldiers. Instead of seeking revenge, he donated his son's organs to Israeli children. In April 2010, The Heart of Jenin won the German Film Award for Best Documentary Film. The film also served as a springboard for the project Cinema Jenin.

== Synopsis ==
The Heart of Jenin recounts the true story of Ismael Khatib, a refugee in the Jenin refugee camp in northern West Bank. In 2005, his eleven-year-old son Ahmed suffers fatal head shots by Israeli soldiers who mistake him for an armed Palestinian due to a toy weapon. After physicians in a hospital in Haifa declare Ahmed brain-dead, Ismael has to decide if his son's organs should be donated. His decision (with his wife's consent) demonstrates humanity at the moment of his greatest sorrow. Thus, the Palestinian enables the survival of Israeli children in the midst of the Arab–Israeli conflict.

The film accompanies Ismael Khatib on his visits to the families of three children who survived thanks to Ahmed's organ donation. The different encounters – with an Orthodox Jewish, a Druze and a Bedouin family, as well as with soldiers at checkpoints – always reflect the situation in the conflict-laden region.

== Production ==
The film was produced by production company Eikon Südwest in cooperation with broadcasting companies SWR and arte as well as other production companies, German Filmperspektive and Israeli Mozer Film Ltd. It was sponsored by MFG Filmförderung Baden-Württemberg. The film was shown at various film festivals including the Toronto International Film Festival in 2008.

== Reception ==
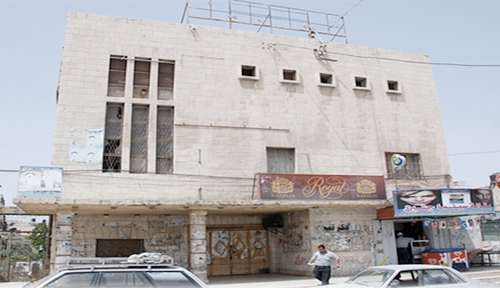
Cinema Jenin before renovations

The film itself, as well as Ismael Khatib's decision to donate his killed son's organs, attracted worldwide attention. The international interest in the film and Ismael Khatib's actions inspired the Italian city of Cuneo to found a youth centre in Jenin's refugee camp. There had been a lack of cultural institutions especially for young people in Jenin. Director Marcus Vetter, who had spent a longer period of time in Jenin during the filming, also began to work with young people and to offer film workshops. In Ismael Khatib's youth center, the young people worked on their own short films - and realized that there was no place to show them. Together with Ismael Khatib and his translator Fakhri Hamad, Marcus Vetter became aware of the old cinema in the heart of the city of Jenin, which had been closed since the beginning of the first Intifada in 1987. Thus came about the idea of creating the project Cinema Jenin, which initially aimed at reopening the old cinema and has meanwhile grown to become one of the largest social entrepreneurship companies in the West Bank.

In 2010, Ismael Khatib was awarded the Hessian Peace Prize in the Wiesbaden State Parliament in Germany. For the first time ever, this prize was awarded to a simple man and not to a world leader. The laudatory speech was given by the former Israeli ambassador to Germany, Avi Primor, who described how difficult Khatib's gesture of peace had been in the tense situation in Israel. "Most people would have thought of revenge," Primor said. Khatib resisted this impulse even when families of the saved Israeli children received him in a hostile manner. Primor quoted Jewish and Islamic beliefs, stating that in both religions the idea exists that whoever saves a life saves the whole world. "You saved the world five times". Primor ended his speech with a simple gesture, his last word being "Shukran", which in Arabic, Khatib's language, means "thank you".

=== Critical response in German media ===
The paper Süddeutsche Zeitung wrote: "[...] A journey through occupied territories and prejudiced hearts – the story of a man, who no longer fights against his enemies but confuses them with his humanity. [...] The Heart of Jenin skilfully connects Ismael Khatibs personal story with the political background: images of a Palestinian suicide attack, of destroyed buildings in Jenin after an Israeli military operation, desperate people on either side, who are left with nothing."

German newspaper Tagesspiegel called the case

"[...] an unambiguously good deed, which resulted in more irritation than a suicide attack could ever have. Defiantly, it goes beyond the brutal logic of this conflict and is at the same time just as compelling: These children with new organs really exist, this fact cannot be argued away. Even the political enemies must acknowledge it. It is not impossible that even Ismael Khatib's anger at his child's death is part of this gesture."

The German film assessment board rated the film "highly recommended": "The German director and his Israeli colleague follow this exceptional story right from the start and, at the same time, show a cross-section of the lives of different people in the crisis area between military presence and cultural prejudices. An admirable, humane and politically highly relevant plea that doesn't fail to take effect. Absolutely worth seeing!"

=== Critical response in Israeli media ===
The liberal Israeli newspaper Ha'aretz writes that [o]f the hundreds of tragic tales of children killed during decades of Israeli-Palestinian conflict, Ahmed Khatib's must rank among the most remarkable. [...] One of its most touching, and disappointing, sequences is toward the end of the film, when, two years after Ahmed's death, Khatib and his brother embark on a road trip around Israel in a beat-up car to visit the children whose lives they saved. The climax is a confrontation with the Levinson family, who, in an awkward exchange at their Jerusalem home, apologise for their earlier comments and thank Khatib, but betray a deep misunderstanding about life in the occupied West Bank.“

An author of the German-Israeli online magazine HaGalil on Jewish issues criticized the film on the occasion of its premiere in Jerusalem: “The film is authentic, emotionally charged and impressively well made. [...] A really good film that will certainly win many awards. But at the same time it is a one-sided propagandist film, capable of stirring up anti-Jewish feelings among the German public. [...]“

== Awards and nominations ==
Award	Category	Recipients and nominees	Result
Cinema for Peace Awards 2009	Most Valuable Documentary of the Year	Leon Geller	Won
Dubai International Film Festival 2008	People's Choice Award	Marcus Vetter, Leon Geller	Won
European Film Awards 2009	European Documentary	Marcus Vetter, Leon Geller	Nominated
Film+ 2009	Editing Award - Feature Film Non-Fiction	Saskia Metten	Nominated
German Film Awards 2010	Best Documentary	Ernst Ludwig Ganzert, Ulli Pfau	Won
DOK Leipzig Festival 2008	DEFA Sponsoring Prize for an Outstanding German Documentary Film	Leon Geller	Won
News & Documentary Emmy Awards 2010	Outstanding Informational Programming - Long Form		Nominated
Nuremberg Film Festival "Turkey-Germany" 2011	Öngören Prize	Marcus Vetter, Leon Geller	Won
The Hague Movies that Matter Festival 2009	Audience Award	Leon Geller	Won
The Hague Movies that Matter Festival 2009	AllRights Award	Leon Geller	Nominated
Valladolid International Film Festival 2008	Best Documentary - Time Of History	Leon Geller	Won
Warsaw International Film Festival 2008	Best Documentary	Marcus Vetter, Leon Geller	Nominated
Warsaw Jewish Film Festival 2008	David Camera Award - Special Mention	Leon Geller	Won
Warsaw Jewish Film Festival 2008	David Camera Award - Best Documentary Feature	Leon Geller	Nominated

== See also ==
- Israeli–Arab organ donations
