= Gerhard Richter Painting =

- Directed by: Corinna Belz
- Written by: Corinna Belz
- Produced by: Thomas Kufus
- Starring: Gerhard Richter
- Cinematography: Dieter Stürmer; Johann Feindt; Frank Kranstedt
- Edited by: Stephan Krumbiegel
- Production company: zero one film
- Release date: 8 September 2011
- Running time: 101 minutes
- Country: Germany
- Language: German

Gerhard Richter Painting is a 2011 German documentary film about the artist Gerhard Richter. It was directed by Corinna Belz. It received the German Film Award for Best Documentary Film.

== Synopsis ==
The film follows the contemporary artist Gerhard Richter. It focuses on his creative process as he develops and completes a new piece.

== Release ==
The film was released in Germany on 8 September 2011.

== Reception ==
Racher Salz of The New York Times said the film shows rather than tells and called Richter "an excellent subject, serious and purposeful but also unexpectedly good-natured". Alissa Simon of Variety called the film "a gorgeously rendered work of art".

Gerhard Richter Painting received the German Film Award for Best Documentary Film at the German Film Awards 2012.
