= Beuys (film) =

2017 film

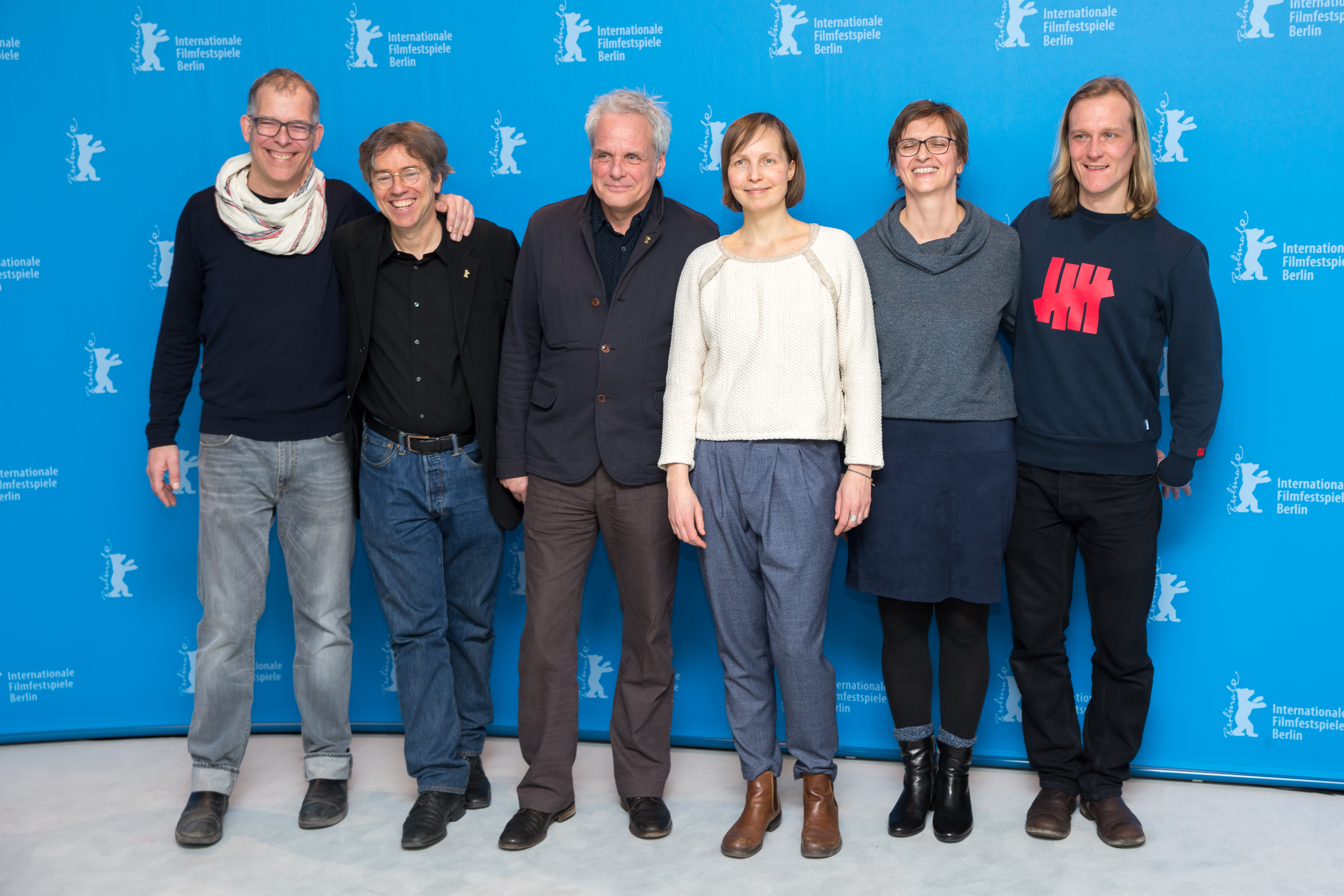
- The film team
- Directed by: Andres Veiel
- Written by: Andres Veiel
- Produced by: Thomas Kufus
- Cinematography: Jörg Jeshel
- Edited by: Stephan Krumbiegal; Olaf Voigtländer
- Music by: Ulrich Reuter; Damian Scholl
- Release date: 14 February 2017 (Berlin)
- Running time: 107 minutes
- Country: Germany
- Language: German

Beuys is a 2017 German documentary film directed by Andres Veiel about the German artist Joseph Beuys. It was selected to compete for the Golden Bear in the main competition section of the 67th Berlin International Film Festival.

Noting that the film emphasizes the "social conscience" behind Beuys's art, Glenn Kenny, writing for The New York Times, called it "an exhilarating portrait of a unique truth-teller".
