= Marcus Vetter =

German documentary filmmaker

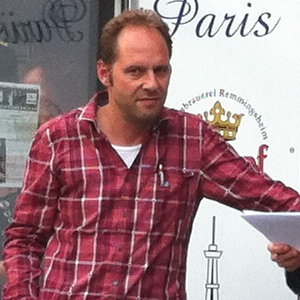
Marcus Vetter in June 2011

Marcus Attila Vetter (* 1967 in Stuttgart) is a German documentary filmmaker.

== Life and career ==
Vetter was born to a Turkish father, Cahit Cubuk, and a German mother. After studying in Worms, Buenos Aires and Madrid (with a focus on European Business Management among others) Vetter started working as a trainee at the production company Bavaria Film in Munich and graduated in Media Studies and Practice at the University of Tübingen in 1994. Since 1994 he worked as a freelance editor, writer and director at SDR in Stuttgart, in 1998 he went to SWR in Baden-Baden, to work as a freelance documentary filmmaker for culture and society.

Vetter's autobiographical documentary My Father the Turk (2006) was awarded the Prix Europa for documentaries. In June 2007, his documentary Traders' Dream was released in German cinemas, a global report on the phenomenon eBay, produced in cooperation with Stefan Tolz. Vetters feature documentary The Heart of Jenin, a film about the Palestinian Ismail Khatib, won the German Film Award 2010 for Best Documentary. Upon completion, Vetter founded the Cinema Jenin e. V., which has the goal to rebuild the cinema Jenin in the West bank that has been closed since 1987. Since 2008 Vetter has regularly been travelling to Jenin in order to promote the project; at the same time he made a film about the project, which was presented in 2012. Simultaneously he filmed the SWR documentary Hunger.

Vetter lives in Tübingen with his wife and two children.

== Filmography ==
- 1998: Hardy B. – Psycho gram of a lifer
- 1999: Life is wonderful – Former pop singers Leismann now touring through construction markets
- 1999: Megabucks – Daytrader's stock exchange roulette
- 1999: The Tunnel – About a legendary escape tunnel in Berlin
- 2000: Where money grows – The EM.TV Story
- 2001: Broadway Bruchsal – Actors dreams in a little German theatre
- 2002: War Games – The computer game Counterstrike
- 2003: Broadway Bruchsal – Actors dreams in a little German theatre
- 2003: La Florida – The collapse of the banking system in Argentina
- 2004: From zero to 42 – Docu Soap about amateur Marathon runners
- 2006: My father the Turk
- 2006: The Unbreakables – The reanimation of the glass manufacturer Theresienthal
- 2007: Traders' Dreams – The eBay phenomena
- 2008: The Heart of Jenin
- 2009: Hunger – the various faces of hunger
- 2011: After the Silence – An Israeli woman meets the family of the suicide bomber who killed her husband.
- 2012: Cinema Jenin – The story of a dream
- 2013: The International Criminal Court
- 2014: The Forecaster – The story of Martin Armstrong
- 2016: Killing for Love – The story of Jens Soering
- 2019: The Forum - About the World Economic Forum

== Awards (selection) ==
Adolf Grimme Prize 2000 for The Tunnel

German Television Award 2000 for The Tunnel

Adolf Grimme Prize 2001 for Wo das Geld wächst – die EM.TV-Story

Ernst Schneider Award 2001 for Wo das Geld wächst – die EM.TV-Story

Axel Springer Prize 2000 for ...ein Schweinegeld! Daytrader beim Börsenroulette

Ludwig Erhard Prize [4] for ...ein Schweinegeld! Daytrader beim Börsenroulette

Adolf Grimme Special Prize of North Rhine-Westphalia 2002 for Broadway Bruchsal

Prix Europa 2006 for My Father the Turk

The Cinema for Peace Award for the Most Valuable Documentary of the Year 2009 for The Heart of Jenin

German Film Awards 2010 for The Heart of Jenin

Robert Geisendörfer Prize 2011 together with Karin Steinberger for Hunger
