= Enrique Sánchez Lansch =

Spanish-German film director and screenwriter

Enrique Sánchez Lansch (born 1963) is a Spanish-German film director and screenwriter.

== History ==
Enrique Sánchez Lansch was born in Gijón, Northern Spain to a Spanish father and German mother. He was raised in Gijón and Cologne, Germany. During his extensive academic and artistic education in theatre and music (including a career as an opera singer as well as a master's degree in Romance Philology, writing his master’s thesis on film adaptation of literature) Enrique Sánchez Lansch worked as an assistant director first for opera productions and later for film and TV while still performing on the opera stage. In the mid 1990s he decided to focus exclusively on film. His work brought him beyond Germany to Italy, France and Greece, writing and directing films mostly on the subjects of music, opera and ballet.

After some years of producing and directing fiction programs for television, Enrique Sánchez Lansch spent a year developing new projects and improving his film and screenwriting skills at Columbia University in New York, and at the University of California at Los Angeles (UCLA). Since 2002 he has been based in Berlin, working as a director and writer of feature length films, both documentary and fiction.

== Filmography ==
- Russian Salon Music - Scriabin and Rachmaninoff. TV-Production in the studios of WDR-Cologne, Germany (Producer: José Montes-Baquer). Documentary and virtuoso piano works played by Burkard Schliessmann. 30 min, 1995
- Rhythm Is It! - Cinema documentary co-directed by Thomas Grube on a dance project with schoolchildren on Stravinsky's Le sacre du printemps with choreographer Royston Maldoom, Sir Simon Rattle and the Berlin Philharmonic. 100 min, 2004
- Sing for your life! - Documentary about hopes and fears of young participants in the competition Neue Stimmen. 60 min, 2005
- Schumann, Schubert and the Snow film adaptation of the piano opera by Hans Neuenfels with art songs by Robert Schumann and Franz Schubert. 60 min. 2006.
- Art of the Fugue Musicfilm about Bach's Art of the Fugue with the Ensemble Musica Antiqua Köln, shot in the Langen Foundation, Neuss – Reinhard Goebel. 75 min. 2007.
- Mstislaw Rostropowitsch – The musical conscience Documentary about and with cellist and director Rostropowitsch with his last orchestral rehearsals and masterclasses. 52 min. 2007.
- Jetzt ist die Zeit schon um... two-piece documentary about Rachmaninow and growing old. With Semyon Bychkov and the WDR Symphonyorchestra. 2× 60 min. 2007.
- “The Reichsorchester” - Documentary about the Berlin Philharmonic between 1933 and 1945. 90 min, 2007
- The Promise of music – Documentary about the young conductor Gustavo Dudamel and the Sinfónica de la Juventud Venezolana Simón Bolívar. 90 min, 2008
- Lass mich ewig komponieren. KLANG – the 24 hours of the day. Documentary about rehearsals and premiere of Stockhausens cycle KLANG. 60 min. 2010.
- Piano Encounters - In different workshops young children meet world class pianists Emanuel Ax, Katia & Marielle Labéque, Gabriela Montero and the Duo Tal & Groethuysen. A film about the highs and lows of practicing the piano. 95 min, 2010
- Irgendwo auf der Welt Dagmar Manzel discovers Werner Richard Heymann. Documentary. 59min. 2011
- SUNDAY from LIGHT - The premiere of Karl-Heinz Stockhausen's opera. Documentary. 59min. 2011
- The 12 - The 12 Cellists of the Berlin Philharmonic. Documentary. 59 min. 2012
- Overture 1912 - 100 Years Deutsche Oper Berlin. Documentary. 90 min. 2012.
- Sound of the Ruhr - 25 Years Ruhr Piano Festival. Documentary. 59 min. 2013
- Pol Pot Dancing. Documentary. 102 min. 2024

== Awards ==
The theatrical documentary Rhythm is it! was awarded with the German Critics Award, the Bavarian Film Award and twice with the German Film Award.

The Promise of Music received the Best Music Documentary Award at the Los Angeles Latino International Film Festival.

The Reichsorchester was awarded the Diapason D'Or De L'Année 2008, and the Choc du Monde de La Musique De L'Année 2008.

Piano Encounters won the second prize for best documentary 2010 at the SEMINCI, the international film festival in Valladolid, Spain.

Pol Pot Dancing received the Best Documentary Award at the San Francisco Dance Film Festival.
