= Andres Veiel =

German film director

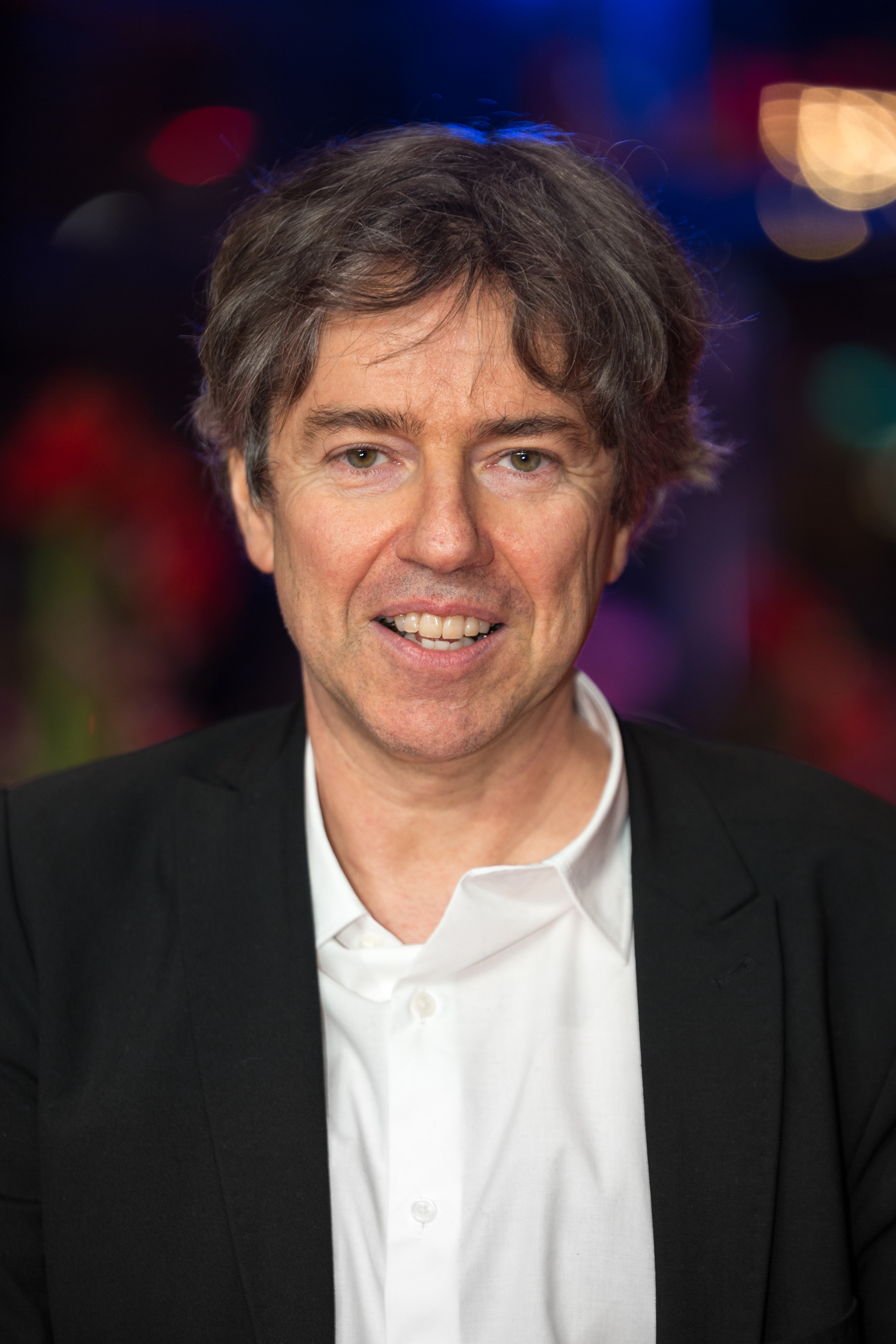
- Veiel in 2017
- Born: 16 October 1959 (age 66); Stuttgart, West Germany
- Occupations: Film director, screenwriter
- Years active: 1992–present

Andres Veiel (German: [ˈandʁəs ˈfaɪəl]; born 16 October 1959) is a German film and theater director and writer.

== Biography ==
From 1982 to 1988, Veiel studied Psychology at the Free University of Berlin and attended the director's class of Krzysztof Kieślowski at the Independent Berlin Artist Center Künstlerhaus Bethanien from 1985 to 1989. As professors, the Künstlerhaus Bethanien gathered other renowned International and European directors such as Andrei Tarkovsky, Patrice Chéreau and Robert Wilson.

Veiel's first documentary film Winternachtstraum (Winter Night's Dream) resulted from his theatrical work with a group of senior actresses and premiered 1992 at the Duisburger Filmwoche, an annual festival for German-speaking documentaries.

His next documentary about a Jewish-Palestinian theater group in Israel, Balagan, won in 1993 the Findling Award than was screened at the 1994 Berlin International Film Festival (Berlinale) and awarded with the Peace Film Award, the Camera Award and the German Film Award in silver. In 1996, Veiel shot his most personal film, Die Überlebenden (The survivors). It pictures the fate of three of Veiel's former schoolmates who committed suicide.

In 2001, a large audience took notice of Veiel's documentary Black Box BRD, in which he is bringing the biographies of Alfred Herrhausen, chairman of the Deutsche Bank and his suspected assassin and Red Army Fraction (RAF) member Wolfgang Grams face to face. Black Box BRD has won numerous awards, among others the European Film Award, the German Film Award and the Santa Barbara Film Festival Insight Award.

Veiel's next released work returned to the field of theater. Die Spielwütigen (Addicted to Acting) portrays four Berlin based acting students during the period of almost seven years and premiered at the 2004 Berlin International Film Festival.

In 2005, the documentary theater play Der Kick (The Kick) about the 2002 murder of a teenager by three neo-Nazi teenagers in East Germany, which Veiel has written together with Gesine Schmidt, was first performed at theaters in Basel (Switzerland) and Berlin and was invited to the major German Theater Festival, the Berlin Theater Festival (Theatertreffen der Berliner Festspiele) in May 2006. To date, the play has been performed by more than 60 theaters and has been translated into nine languages. Based on the performance of the play, Veiel created a documentary film which was first shown at the Berlinale 2006. Furthermore, German public radio stations collaborated with Veiel to produce an eponymic radio drama in 2005.

According to his technique of longstanding and profound research when dealing with a subject, Veiel explores the topics of his films also as an author of non-fictional books. Black Box BRD. Alfred Herrhausen, the Deutsche Bank, the RAF and Wolfgang Grams gathers and extends by far the results of the research shown in the film. In 2007, Der Kick - ein Lehrstück über Gewalt (The Kick - a Lesson in Violence) is released and is awarded with the Deutsche Jugendliteraturpreis (German Youth's Literature Award) in 2008.

Wer, wenn nicht wir (If Not Us, Who?), Veiel's first feature film, was shot in 2010 and premiered in the competition of the Berlin International Film Festival in 2011, where it was awarded with the Alfred Bauer Prize. The film covers the history and genesis of the RAF and the relationship of the German author and publisher Bernward Vesper towards the RAF's founding members Gudrun Ensslin and Andreas Baader. Main protagonists of the film were August Diehl, Lena Lauzemis and Alexander Fehling. It received various awards, including the 2011 German Film Award in Bronze the Hessian Film Award for Best Feature Film and for Best Actress, as well as two awards (Best Film Silver Award, Best Male Lead) at the 2011 Seville European Film Festival and the Best International Film Award at the 10th Pune International Film Festival in 2012.

In 2012 Veiel interviewed current and former executive board members from various leading banks. Based on this research, he wrote the theater play Das Himbeerreich (The Raspberry Empire) looking behind the curtain of the financial system, showing personal motives and professional constraints of financial players. Himbeerreich premiered at the Staatstheater Stuttgart and at the Deutsches Theater in Berlin in January 2013.

In February 2017, Veiel's cinema documentary Beuys celebrated its premiere at the competition of the Berlin International Film Festival. With Beuys, Veiel succeeds in bringing the first cinema documentary about Joseph Beuys, one of the most controversial artists of the 20th century, onto the big screen. During the three-year development period, Veiel conducted more than 60 interviews with contemporary witnesses of Beuys and viewed 400 hours of archival footage, went through 300 hours of audio footage and more than 20,000 photographs. The film consists of 90% of archival footage, many of which has been published for the first time. Veiel does not try to explain Beuys by the means of a classical biography, but his use of the archival footage rather “allows the viewer to not only enter the time and space that the artwork was developed in, but experience its conception and creation alongside the artist himself.” Veiel is particularly interested in Beuys' extended concept of art as a social sculpture, which anticipates today's demands for basic income and a democratization of the financial and monetary system.

Beuys received positive reactions. It’s described to be the film of record and “the most extensive revisiting of Beuys’s art and life for a general public.” “The documentary Beuys will not only offer a psychological portrait of the man, but chronicle the many ways he sought to reverse the effects of our repressive social systems — and how his breakthroughs continue to influence artists today." Furthermore it’s pointed out that both of Beuys’ “most recognizable and less emblematic works come alive on screen thanks to the inventive ways in which the director dives into the moments depicted in still pictures of the era, while his use of archival footage of Beuys’ installations proves to be a transportive decision." The US - theatrical release of Beuys started on 17 January 2018 and was again well received: The village voice acknowledges that "the engaging Beuys avoids the typical pitfalls of documentaries and that Veiel’s refreshingly open-ended approach invites you to find your own answers" while Glenn Kenny from the New York Times defines Beuys as "an exhilarating portrait of a unique truth-teller. Makes a strong case for Beuys, emphasizing the social conscience at work in his art."

In 2017, Veiel together with the author Jutta Doberstein and in cooperation with the Deutsches Theater Berlin and the Humboldt Forum initiated WHICH FUTURE?!, a two-year interdisciplinary, participatory research and theatre project, dedicated to drafting a fictional, yet evidence-based scenario for the next ten years. With international scientists, artists and the audience meeting in workshops, laboratories and plenary sessions, Which Future?! explored the correlation between knowledge, prediction and design and condensed scenarios for the future development of the financial system, the economy, the climate, food production and work into a jointly developed narrative looking at the years 2018 to 2028. The results were merged into a play that premiered at the Deutsches Theater in September 2018: Let them eat money. Which Future?!

The play was mainly well received and regarded as „an engrossing drama that skillfully avoids preaching or propagandizing” with special recognition for the script, which “does a fine job dramatizing the complex ideas developed during the workshops, explaining complex hypothetical economic and political scenarios in clever and nuanced ways.”

In his German TV movie Ökozid (Ecocide) from 2020, Veiel stages a court drama, as low-key as it is spectacular. The year 2034: The consequences of the climate catastrophe are dramatic. Drought and floods destroy the livelihoods of millions of people. The climate change and the ongoing catastrophe becomes the subject of legal proceedings at the International Court of Justice. Two lawyers represent 31 countries of the global South, which are doomed to destruction without the support of the international community, they raise questions of responsibility, demand compensation and a right of nature to integrity in order to ensure their own survival. High-ranking representatives from politics and industry are invited as witnesses. The court must decide whether German policymakers are to be held accountable for their failure to protect the climate and thus set a precedent for climate justice.

Veiel`s latest film Riefenstahl is considered as a captivating insight into the private estate of Leni Riefenstahl, who became world-famous with her Nazi propaganda film "Triumph of the Will" but kept denying any closer ties to the regime. Riefenstahl's aesthetics are more present than ever today - but is that also true for their implied message? The film examines this question using documents from Riefenstahl's estate, including private films, photos, recordings and letters. It uncovers fragments of her biography and places them in an extended historical context.

The film will have its premiere at the Venice International Film Festival 2024.

Veiel lectured and lectures at various film schools and universities, including the Deutsche Film- und Fernsehakademie Berlin dffb (German Film and Television Academy Berlin), the Free University of Berlin, the University of Zurich, the University of Michigan and is regularly being invited by the Goethe Institute to worldwide lectures, such as in Johannesburg, New Delhi, Calcutta, Osaka, Cairo and Tunis. He is member of the European Film Academy, the German Film Academy (Deutsche Filmakademie) and the Academy of Arts, Berlin.

== Filmography ==
- 1992: Winternachtstraum (Winter Night's Dream), documentary, 82 minutes
- 1993: Balagan, documentary, 90 minutes
- 1996: Die Überlebenden (The Survivors), documentary, 90 minutes
- 2001: Black Box BRD, documentary, 101 minutes
- 2004: Die Spielwütigen (Addicted to Acting), documentary, 108 minutes
- 2006: Der Kick (The Kick), documentary, 82 minutes
- 2011: Wer wenn nicht wir (If Not Us, Who?), feature film, 124 minutes
- 2017: Beuys, documentary, 105 minutes
- 2020: Ökozid (tv movie), 90 minutes
- 2024: Riefenstahl, documentary, 116 minutes

== Theater productions ==
- 2005 Der Kick (The Kick), Theater Basel and Maxim Gorki Theater Berlin
- 2013 Das Himbeerreich (The Raspberry Empire), Staatstheater Stuttgart and Deutsches Theater Berlin
- 2017/2018 Let Them Eat Money. WELCHE ZUKUNFT?! (Let Them Eat Money. WHICH FUTURE?!), Deutsches Theater Berlin and Humboldt Forum Berlin
- 2021 Ökozid (Ecocide), Staatstheater Stuttgart

== Awards ==
- 1994 Peace Award of the Berlin International Film Festival for Balagan
- 1993 Findling Award for Balagan at Internationale Leipziger Dokumentarfilm-Woche (Dok Leipzig)
- 1994 German Film Award in Silver for Balagan
- 1998 Adolf Grimme Award Best Documentary Film for The Survivors
- 2001 European Film Award for Black Box BRD
- 2002 German Film Award for Black Box BRD
- 2004 Panorama Audience Award of the Berlin International Film Festival for Addicted to Acting
- 2008 Adolf Grimme Award for Outstanding Individual Achievement for The Kick
- 2011 German Film Award in Bronze for If Not Us, Who?
- 2011 Hessischer Filmpreis Best Feature Film for If not us, Who?
- 2011 Silver Giraldillo and Best Actor Award für If not us, Who? Seville European Film Festival
- 2017 Guild of German Art House Cinemas - Best Documentary Award for Beuys
- 2017 Bundesverdienstkreuz Erster Klasse (Federal Cross of Merit)
- 2018 German Film Award in Gold (Best Documentary) for Beuys
- 2018 German Film Award in Gold (Best Editing) for Beuys
- 2018 German Film Award Nominee (Best Film Score) for Beuys
- 2018 German Documentary Film Music Award for Beuys
- 2021 Best screenplay award (nomination) for Ökozid (Ecocide), Deutsche Akademie für Fernsehen
- 2024: Premio CINEMA & ARTS Award for Best Picture, 81. Venice International Film Festival
- 2024: Cine Docs Prize - Miskolc Cine Fest Festival Hungary
- 2024: Grand Jury Prize - 14. Film Festival Valenciennes
- 2024: Winner Gold Award - Spotlight Documentary Award
- 2024: Best Documentary 2024 - Gilde Filmpreis of AG Kino-Gilde
- 2024: Youth Jury Favorite 2024 - Filmkunstmesse Leipzig 2024
- 2024: Grand Jury Prize 14. Film Festival Valenciennes
- 2024: Best Documentary Award - “Michel Ciment” Pessac Film Festival
- 2025: Best Documentary - Dublin International Film Festival
- 2025: Jury Prize, Atlanta Jewish Film Festival
- 2025: Best Documentary - German Film Awards (Nomination)
- 2025: Jury Prize - Fire Bird Arward Hong Kong
- 2025: European Film, European Documentary - European Film Award (Nomination)
- 2025: Best Documentary Feature, Best Archival Documentary, Best Historical Documentary - Critics Choice Awards (Nomination)

== Bibliography ==
=== By Veiel ===
- Andres Veiel (1991). Die letzte Probe. Ein Stück Revolution im Altenheim. Theaterstück in 3 Akten. S. Fischer Verlag, Frankfurt/Main.
- Andres Veiel (1992). Hier drin kannst du alles haben. Ein Stück Knast. In: Theater, Theater. Aktuelle Stücke. Bd. 2. S. Fischer Verlag, Frankfurt/Main.
- Andres Veiel (2002). Black Box BRD. Alfred Herrhausen, die Deutsche Bank, die RAF und Wolfgang Grams. Deutsche Verlags-Anstalt, Munich, ISBN 978-3-421-05468-5.
- Andres Veiel (2007). Der Kick. Ein Lehrstück über Gewalt. Deutsche Verlags-Anstalt, Munich, ISBN 978-3-421-04213-2.
- Gerd Koenen, Andres Veiel (2008). 1968. Bildspur eines Jahres. Fackelträger Verlag, Cologne, ISBN 978-3-7716-4359-1.
- Andres Veiel, Beatice Ottersbach (2008). Dokumentarfilm. Werkstattberichte. UVK Verlagsgesellschaft, Konstanz, ISBN 978-3-86764085-5.

=== About Veiel ===
- Nikolas Fischer (2009). Das Kino des Andres Veiel. Politische Filme im Balanceakt zwischen Dokument und Fiktion. Mensch und Buch Verlag, Berlin, ISBN 978-3-86664-527-1.
- Claudia Lenssen (2019): Andres Veiel. Schüren Verlag, Marburg ISBN 978-3-89472-717-8 (to be published in March 2019)
