= Cinema Jenin =

Cinema in Jenin, West Bank, Palestine

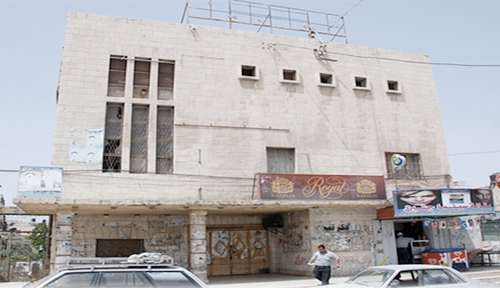
Cinema Jenin before renovations

Cinema Jenin (Arabic: سينما جنين) was a movie theater in Jenin, West Bank, Palestine. After more than 30 years of vacancy, it had reopened in 2010 after a controversial German NGO, led by Marcus Vetter, renovated it with the help of Palestinian and international volunteers. Seven years later, it was demolished to make place for a commercial center.

The cinema was located in the heart of the city, next to the old church, the market (suq) and the main transportation routes. The old cinema had 250 seats on the first floor and another 200 on a balcony.

The renovated building featured plush seating that can accommodate more than 300 people, an outdoor café, art gallery space, a children's park and playground, and a library that is sponsored by the German Goethe-Institut. It replaced a cinema that closed in 1987.

The cinema was not without its critics. Due to the strong focus of the German NGO on peace and its occasional collaboration with Israeli institutions at the start of the project, some members of the local population feared that this will lead to a normalisation of the balance of power in the region. Moreover, the German NGO claimed to work only with Palestinians and Palestinian materials unless absolutely necessary, however due to (amongst other reasons) the enormous publicity of the project, this idea was let go in favor of "better quality", resulting in a lot of imported materials as well as teachers from Germany and the rest of Europe. Many Palestinians boycotted the cinema, claiming that unmarried men and women slept together in the cinema's guest house, and drank alcohol there. Audience numbers dwindled. Following death threats that were circulated in the mosques in early 2011, many foreign nationals were evacuated from the Cinema Jenin project, at the request of their governments.

In 2025, Palestinian filmmaker Alex Bakri, the original director of photography for Markus Vetter, released his documentary "Habibi Hussein". It follows Hussein Darbi and his work with the German NGO restoring the building. Having previously worked at Cinema Jenin for 43 years, Hussein Darbi helps to restore the old projectors. He hopes that his passion and trials and tribulations, working in the Occupied Territory of Palestine, might lead to getting his old job back in the renewed Cinema.

== Renovations ==
The renovation was carried out as an international charitable effort intended to encourage a culture of cinema-going for the inhabitants of Jenin by showing films of various genres, including fiction films, documentaries, comedies, children’s films, Arabic classics and contemporary movies.

It was planned to have six screenings along with other activities every day. A website was created to present the various activities of the cinema. Workshops in film making, computers and English would also be offered at the cinema. Football matches were also screened when the planned movie programme failed to take off.

The German Government (Auswärtiges Amt) sponsored Cinema Jenin with a large donation. Roger Waters and Prince also donated to the project.

The Jenin cinema reopened in August 2010. For the grand reopening they showed a movie called The Heart of Jenin. Seven years later, due to insufficient profit for investors, the building was demolished to make space for a commercial center.

== Documentaries ==
In 2011, Maurizio Fantoni Minnella shot Tonight on Jenin, a documentary about the experience of the cinema and Jenin's inhabitants. The documentary is part of Palestinian Quadrilogy.

Markus Vetter, head of the NGO that renovated the cinema, released a movie titled "Cinema Jenin: The Story of a Dream" in 2012. Alex Bakri was the director of photography.

Thirteen years later, the original Director of Photography and Palestinian filmmaker Alex Bakri, released his take on the project with the documentary "Habibi Hussein". The documentary, released in 2025, follows Hussein Darbi, a passionate projectionist who worked at Cinema Jenin before it became vacant in 1987. The documentary criticises the power relations between the German NGO of Markus Vetter and the Palestinian projectionist. Funding for the film included Odeh Films (Palestine), Arab Fund for Arts and Culture (AFAC), and Kaske Film (Germany).

== See also ==
- Cinema of Palestine
- Arab cinema
- Israeli–Palestinian conflict
- Al-Kasaba Theatre
- Cinema for Peace
