= List of German film directors =

This is a list of notable German film directors related to the cinema of Germany.

== A ==
- Alfred Abel
- Willy Achsel
- Herbert Achternbusch
- Robert van Ackeren
- Maren Ade
- Percy Adlon
- Fatih Akin
- Bülent Akinci
- Züli Aladağ
- Hans Albin
- Claudia von Alemann
- Lexi Alexander
- Jürgen von Alten
- Christian Alvart
- Karl Anton
- Thomas Arslan
- Arno Assmann
- Emily Atef

== B ==
- Aleksander Bach
- Helmuth M. Backhaus
- Jo Baier
- Boleslaw Barlog
- Tevfik Başer
- James Bauer
- Christian Baumeister
- Christopher Becker
- Lars Becker
- Wolfgang Becker (1910–2005)
- Wolfgang Becker (1954–2024)
- Gerhard Behrendt
- Hans Behrendt
- Dirk van den Berg
- Edward Berger
- Ludwig Berger
- Curtis Bernhardt
- Hans Bertram
- Andreas Bethmann
- Frank Beyer
- Nico Beyer
- Rudolf Biebrach
- Hans Billian
- Leo Birinski
- Kurt Blachy
- Tabea Blumenschein
- Walter Bockmayer
- Carl Boese
- Bernd Böhlich
- Hark Bohm
- Uwe Boll
- Heinrich Bolten-Baeckers
- Jan Bonny
- Walter Boos
- Nicolai Borger (born 1974)
- Detlef Bothe
- Jürgen Böttcher
- John Brahm
- Horst E. Brandt
- Thomas Brasch
- Peter Paul Brauer
- Alfred Braun
- Harald Braun
- Heinrich Breloer
- Matthias Brenner
- Jonatan Briel
- Uta Briesewitz
- Georg Brintrup
- Yvonne Brosch
- Jutta Brückner
- Franziska Buch
- Fritz Peter Buch
- Gerhard T. Buchholz
- Detlev Buck
- Loriot
- Wolfgang Busch
- Norbert Busè
- Jörg Buttgereit

== C ==
- Ciro Cappellari
- Heiner Carow
- Neco Celik
- Erik Charell
- Maja Classen
- Bastian Clevé
- Volker von Collande
- Constantin J. David
- Ludwig Czerny
- Géza von Cziffra

== D ==
- Gertrud David
- Hans Deppe
- Siegfried Dessauer
- William Dieterle
- Helmut Dietl
- Iain Dilthey
- Rodica Doehnert
- Solveig Dommartin
- Marian Dora
- Ferdinand Dörfler
- Doris Dörrie
- Christoph Dreher
- Michael Dreher
- Andreas Dresen (born 1963)
- Slatan Dudow
- E. A. Dupont
- Manfred Durniok
- Alfred Duskes
- Rudolf Dworsky

== E ==
- Uli Edel
- Jörg A. Eggers
- Richard Eichberg
- Benjamin Eicher
- Bruno Eichgrün
- Christoph Eichhorn
- Bernd Eichinger
- Florian Eichinger
- Heinz Emigholz
- Klaus Emmerich
- Roland Emmerich
- Erich Engel
- Erich Engels
- Ulrich Erfurth
- Erich Eriksen
- André Erkau
- Holger Ernst

== F ==
- Arnold Fanck
- Thomas Fantl
- Max Färberböck
- Harun Farocki (1944–2014)
- Rainer Werner Fassbinder (1945–1982)
- Rudi Fehr
- Michael Fengler
- Jan Fethke
- Andy Fetscher
- E. W. Fiedler
- Frauke Finsterwalder
- Hans Fischerkoesen
- Florian David Fitz
- Uwe Flade
- Peter Fleischmann
- Jürgen Flimm
- Marc Forster
- Lilian Franck
- Herbert B. Fredersdorf
- Thor Freudenthal
- Karl Freund
- Jochen Alexander Freydank
- Carl Froelich
- Eberhard Frowein

== G ==
- Florian Gallenberger (born 1972)
- Dennis Gansel
- Claudia Garde
- Katja von Garnier
- Adolf Gärtner
- Karl Gass
- Katrin Gebbe
- Hans W. Geißendörfer
- Heidi Genée
- Fritz Genschow
- Herbert Gerdes
- Kurt Gerron
- Jan-Ole Gerster (born 1978)
- Karl Peter Gillmann
- Matthias Glasner
- Niko von Glasow
- Rochus Gliese
- Vadim Glowna
- Curt Goetz
- Heinz Goldberg
- Christian Görlitz
- Peter Gorski
- Jürgen Goslar
- Dominik Graf
- Roland Gräf
- Jörg Graser
- Mutz Greenbaum
- Wolf Gremm
- Hans Grimm
- Valeska Grisebach
- Esther Gronenborn
- Philip Gröning
- Richard Groschopp
- Nina Grosse
- Gustaf Gründgens
- Bernhard Grzimek
- Michael Grzimek
- Egon Günther
- Iris Gusner
- Johannes Guter
- Michael Gwisdek

== H ==
- Bettina Haasen
- Horst Hächler
- Lutz Hachmeister
- Rolf Hädrich
- Peter Hamel
- Hanna Henning
- Hans Hinrich
- Rolf Hansen
- Milo Harbich
- Thea von Harbou
- Thomas Harlan
- Veit Harlan
- Falk Harnack
- Reinhard Hauff
- Dietrich Haugk
- Richard Häussler
- Leander Haußmann
- Karl Heiland
- Birgit Hein
- Albert Heine
- Hans Heinrich
- Thomas Heise
- Benjamin Heisenberg
- Veit Helmer
- Florian Henckel von Donnersmarck (born 1973)
- Michael Herbig
- Oliver Herbrich
- Helmut Herbst
- Hermann Kugelstadt
- Werner Herzog
- Elmar Hess
- Marianne Hettinger
- Jochen Hick
- Heinz Hille
- Heinz Hilpert
- Fritz Hippler
- Oliver Hirschbiegel
- Werner Hochbaum
- Christoph Hochhäusler
- Franz Hofer
- Hilmar Hoffmann
- Kurt Hoffmann
- Bernd Hofmann
- Sherry Hormann
- Rebecca Horn
- Hermine Huntgeburth
- George Hurdalek
- Gerhard Huttula

== I ==
- Olaf Ittenbach

== J ==
- Anja Jacobs
- Werner Jacobs
- Georg Jacoby
- Thomas Jahn
- Uwe Janson
- Björn Jensen
- Petra Joy
- Rudolf Jugert
- Kurt Jung-Alsen
- Gottfried Junker
- Steffen Jürgens
- Phil Jutzi

== K ==
- Philipp Kadelbach
- Diana Karenne
- Romuald Karmakar
- Hans-Joachim Kasprzik
- Sandra Kaudelka
- Rolf Kauka
- Helmut Käutner
- Fred Kelemen
- Otto Kelmer
- Charlotte Kerr
- Edith Kiel
- Max W. Kimmich
- Herwig Kipping
- Fritz Kirchhoff
- Ralf Kirsten
- Freya Klier
- Werner Klingler
- Alexander Kluge
- Erich Kobler
- Carl Koch
- Ulrike Koch
- Manfred R. Köhler
- Wolfgang Kohlhaase
- Lee Kohlmar
- Henry Koster
- Viktor de Kowa
- Uwe Jens Krafft
- Hans Kratzert
- Lars Kraume (born 1973)
- Chris Kraus (born 1963)
- Marco Kreuzpaintner
- Norbert Kückelmann
- Karl Georg Külb
- Joachim Kunert
- Anton Kutter

== L ==
- Bernd Michael Lade
- Ernst Laemmle
- Gerhard Lamprecht
- Fritz Lang (1890–1976)
- Leo Lasko
- Jakob Lass
- Erwin Leiser
- Paul Leni
- Adolf E. Licho
- Wolfgang Liebeneiner
- Peter Lilienthal
- Theo Lingen
- Caroline Link
- Alois Johannes Lippl
- Ulli Lommel
- Ralph Lothar
- Ernst Lubitsch
- Malte Ludin

== M ==
- Angelina Maccarone
- Max Mack
- Kurt Maetzig
- Herbert Maisch
- Farid Majari
- Anja Marquardt
- Valerie von Martens
- Karlheinz Martin
- Paul Martin
- Joe May
- Paul May
- Philipp Lothar Mayring
- Pia Mechler
- Jeanine Meerapfel
- Lothar Mendes
- Gerhard Menzel
- Ernő Metzner
- Johannes Meyer
- Rolf Meyer
- Ulf Miehe
- Tamara Milosevic
- Thomas Mitscherlich
- Hubert Moest
- Lutz Mommartz
- Hans Moser
- Armin Mueller-Stahl
- Hans Müller
- Nikolai Müllerschön
- Reinhard Münster
- F. W. Murnau

== N ==
- Vivian Naefe
- Werner Nekes
- Sandra Nettelbeck
- Alwin Neuß
- Erik Niedling
- Ingo Niermann
- Marcus Nispel
- Manfred Noa
- Daniel Nocke
- Rudolf Noelte
- Hans Noever
- Max Nosseck
- Till Nowak

== O ==
- Max Obal
- Erik Ode
- Max Ophüls
- Franz Osten
- Peter Ostermayr
- Ulrike Ottinger

== P ==
- Heinz Paul
- Anne-Kathrin Peitz
- Henrik Peschel
- Christian Peschken
- Wolfgang Petersen
- Ingo Petzke
- Christian Petzold
- Konrad Petzold
- Michael Pfleghar
- Harald Philipp
- Siegfried Philippi
- Lupu Pick
- Harry Piel
- Mark Poepping
- Arthur Pohl
- Ayşe Polat
- Gerhard Polt
- Franz Porten
- Rosa Porten
- Rosa von Praunheim
- Peter Przygodda
- Manfred Purzer

== Q ==
- Hans Quest
- Burhan Qurbani

== R ==
- Lola Randl
- Roland Reber
- Dirk Regel
- Willy Reiber
- Ernst Reicher
- Frank Reicher
- Max Reichmann
- Robert Reinert
- Gottfried Reinhardt
- Lotte Reiniger
- Günter Reisch
- Edgar Reitz (born 1932)
- Angela Richter
- Roland Suso Richter
- Grigorij Richters
- Ziri Rideaux
- Leni Riefenstahl (1902–2003)
- Wolf Rilla
- Otto Rippert
- Frank Ripploh
- Günther Rittau
- Karl Ritter
- Arthur Robison
- Oskar Roehler
- Michael Roes
- Jürgen Roland
- Nic Romm
- Timo Rose
- Marcus H. Rosenmüller
- Marc Rothemund
- Sigi Rothemund
- Günther Rücker
- Ottokar Runze
- Josef Rusnak
- Walter Ruttmann

== S ==
- Nesrin Şamdereli
- Yasemin Şamdereli
- Enrique Sánchez Lansch
- Helke Sander
- Helma Sanders-Brahms
- Dennis Satin
- Anno Saul
- Johannes Schaaf
- Peter Schamoni
- Ulrich Schamoni
- Angela Schanelec
- Jakob Schäuffelen
- Sebastian Schipper (born 1968)
- Alfred Schirokauer
- Wolfgang Schleif
- Christoph Schlingensief
- Volker Schlöndorff
- Ludwig Schmid-Wildy
- Hans-Christian Schmid
- Jan Schmidt-Garre
- Hartmann Schmige
- Andreas Schnaas (born 1968)
- Richard Schneider-Edenkoben
- Helge Schneider
- Gregor Schnitzler
- Gunther Scholz
- Hans Schomburgk
- Walter Schönenbröcher
- Erich Schönfelder
- Hubert Schonger
- Maria Schrader
- Karl Ludwig Schröder
- Werner Schroeter
- Carl-Heinz Schroth
- Rolf Schübel
- Uli M Schueppel
- Eugen Schuhmacher
- Rudolf Schündler
- Reinhold Schünzel
- Jan Schütte
- Til Schweiger
- Hans Schweikart
- Robert Schwentke
- Mathias Schwerbrock
- Christian Schwochow
- Walter Sedlmayr
- Horst Seemann
- Markus Sehr
- Franz Seitz Jr.
- Franz Seitz Sr.
- Herbert Selpin
- Haro Senft
- Gustav von Seyffertitz
- Viola Shafik
- Lior Shamriz
- Andy Siege
- Robert Sigl
- María Sólrún Sigurðardóttir
- Rainer Simon
- Bernhard Sinkel
- Curt Siodmak
- Robert Siodmak
- Douglas Sirk
- Max Skladanowsky
- Franz-Josef Spieker
- The Spierig Brothers
- Zoltan Spirandelli
- Daniel Stamm
- Ivan Stanev
- Fritz Stapenhorst
- Wolfgang Staudte
- Leonard Steckel
- Francesco Stefani
- Hans Steinbichler
- Reinhart Steinbicker
- Rudolf Steiner
- Hans Steinhoff
- Thomas Stellmach
- Nicolas Stemann
- Robert A. Stemmle
- Bernhard Stephan
- Frederick Stephani
- Joe Stöckel
- Hannes Stöhr
- Philipp Stölzl
- Wenzel Storch
- Eva Stotz
- Rüdiger Sünner
- Walter Supper
- Charles Swickard
- Hans-Jürgen Syberberg

== T ==
- Katharina Thalbach
- Robert Thalheim
- Ulrich Thein
- Heinz Thiel
- Rolf Thiele
- Rudolf Thome
- Andrew Thorndike
- Otz Tollen
- Ludwig Trautmann
- Will Tremper
- Georg Tressler
- Monika Treut
- Margarethe von Trotta
- Adolf Trotz
- Vera Tschechowa
- Dito Tsintsadze
- Tom Tykwer

== U ==
- Andrei Ujică
- Fritz Umgelter

== V ==
- Ladislao Vajda
- Dana Vávrová
- Andres Veiel
- Michael Verhoeven
- Paul Verhoeven
- Simon Verhoeven
- Marcus Vetter
- Joseph Vilsmaier
- Volker Vogeler
- Alfred Vohrer
- Patrick Vollrath
- Achim von Borries
- David Vostell

== W ==
- Otto Waalkes
- Christian Wagner
- Thomas Wallner
- Werner W. Wallroth
- Gustav von Wangenheim
- Lothar Warneke
- Erich Waschneck
- William Wauer
- Marco Weber
- Paul Wegener
- Wolfgang Wehrum
- Hans Weidemann
- Alfred Weidenmann
- Helmut Weiss
- Ina Weisse
- Martin Weisz
- Manfred Wekwerth
- Arthur Wellin
- Wim Wenders
- Fritz Wendhausen
- Franz Wenzler
- Hans Werckmeister
- Constantin Werner
- Kai Wessel
- Conrad Wiene
- Robert Wiene
- Marc Wiese
- Georg Wildhagen
- Carl Wilhelm
- Adolf Winkelmann
- Franz Peter Wirth
- Frank Wisbar
- Konrad Wolf
- Carl Heinz Wolff
- Hans Wolff
- Willi Wolff
- Hans von Wolzogen
- Sönke Wortmann

== Y ==
- Mennan Yapo
- Özgür Yıldırım
- Eugen York

== Z ==
- Peter Zadek
- Peter von Zahn
- Frederic Zelnik
- Matt Zemlin
- Hans Heinz Zerlett
- Willy Zeyn
- Erich Ziegel
- Georg Zoch
- Herrmann Zschoche
- Christian Zübert
