= Max Havoc =

Max Havoc may refer to:

- Max Havoc: Curse of the Dragon, 2004 film directed by Albert Pyun and Isaac Florentine
- Max Havoc: Ring of Fire, 2006 film directed by Terry Ingram
