= Christian Peschken =

American film director

- Born: Christian Peschken; June 9, 1955 (age 70); Nümbrecht, North Rhine-Westphalia, West Germany
- Occupations: Cameraman, executive producer, Producer, Screenwriter
- Years active: 1974 - present
- Spouse: Patricia Peschken (26 January 2006 - present)

Christian "Chris" Peschken (born June 9, 1955) is a German-American cameraman, director, producer and screenwriter. He has been involved in film and radio and television production since 1974.

He is a professionally trained Film-Camera Assistant (1974 at German Newsreel / Filmwochenschau 'Blick in die Welt"), and later Film Cameraman, and certified Radio Broadcast Audio Engineer (earned during his service at the 'Bundeswehr' (German Federal Defence Forces) at the Army's Radio Station 'Radio 701 Andernach'.

Since 2014 Peschken and his wife have been living in France, close to Geneva, Switzerland. They created and operated a project Pax Press Agency, Sarl., a Catholic faith based press agency until mid 2019. The couple where accredited TV Correspondents and producers at the United Nations Geneva for EWTN Germany (Eternal Word Television Network) until December 2019.

== Early life ==
Peschken was born in Nümbrecht, West Germany, and grew up in Moers am Rhein. His parents were Cornelius-Johannes Peschken (died 1997) and Renate-Maria Peschken (died 2015).

== Early career (1974–1988) ==
Christian Peschken was involved in the German Radio & TV industry from 1974 until 1988. He narrated numerous live Radio Broadcasts for Hessischer Rundfunk and SWF 3 (one of Germany’s leading, state operated Radio Network at the time).

In 1984, when the media laws of the German states changed, he was among the first television producers that were granted by the AKK (Anstalt für Kabelkommunikation, Ludwigshafen) a license from the government of Rhineland-Palatinate, to broadcast private, commercial television and radio. He then produced and hosted more than 100 episodes of his own weekly TV show "Tonight Special Talkshow" and a daily Radio program. Later he worked for ‘Radio 4 Rosa Welle (a private Radio Network owned by 'Blitz Tip Verlag' Frankfurt)’ as live narrator and commercial author & producer.

Between 1986 and 1988 Peschken was General Manager of a 35 mm film-commercial development & production company. He photographed, directed, produced, edited (35mm Flatbed Steenbeck, and 16mm).

== Hollywood (1989–2005) ==
In 1989 Peschken moved from Germany to Hollywood, California and developed a US/German co-funding/co-production structure for moderate budget films.

From 1994 to 1995 Peschken arranged a co-production / co-financing structure with legendary Producer Roger Corman. He is one of the executive producers of The Spy Within, aka Flight of the Dove starring Scott Glenn and Theresa Russell, Dillinger and Capone starring F. Murray Abraham and Martin Sheen, Captain Nuke & the Bomber Boys, starring Rod Steiger, Martin Sheen, Joanna Pacuła, Joe Piscopo, and Suspect Device starring C. Thomas Howell.

In 1997 Peschken produced Herzflimmern based on the book Vital Signs by Barbara Wood, a US-German coproduction, 2 x 90 min series for German TV ZDF with Maria Furtwängler, Ursula Buschhorn and Carol Campbell, and Assignment Berlin (in Germany "Babyhandel Berlin")', starring Paul Winfield, Cliff Robertson, a co-production with Hallmark Television and Pro 7, Germany. Director was Tony Randel.

In 1998 Peschken wrote the story and screenplay for Hostile Environment(aka Watership Warrior), a US/ Canadian TV Film starring Brigitte Nielsen and Matthias Hues. Director: David A. Prior

From early 1998-1999 Peschken, as independent consultant, executive producer and risk assessor, was involved in several transaction-proposals under so called "insurance backed loan" structures, involving Paramount Pictures, Universal Studios, Chase Securities, Royal-Sun Alliance Insurance, for the co-production / co-financing of slates of major motion pictures and their P&A costs. Peschken was lead negotiator, counseled by major LA attorney firms. He negotiated directly on the VP Business & Legal affairs level with studios such as Paramount Pictures and Universal Studios and MGM.

During 2000 and 2003 Peschken photographed, produced & directed several documentary style TV programs such as Mercenaries of the Lord (Interviewing Homeless People), a weekly reality tv style program (Studio & Original Locations), aired on ‘The Word Network’, and later a 2x 30 min. format Assignment X (helping homeless people), and City Van a weekly 30 min youth program, for JC-TV (a Trinity Broadcasting Network channel) through his 501 C3 Non Profit Organization Mercenaries of the Lord Ministry Inc.

From 2004-05, Peschken, as General Manager of Marina Movie Partners Ltd., and CineFilm Media LLC, he was instrumental in completing a Private Placement Offering in Germany, for the co-funding of a slate of Television feature films with Rigel Entertainment. He is one of the executive producers of : Presumed Dead (2006) with Sherilyn Fenn, Double Cross with Bruce Boxleitner and Barbara Niven, Max Havoc: Ring of Fire with Mickey Hardt and Rae Dawn Chong, Razor with C. Thomas Howell, and Heatstroke with Danica McKellar.

== Present career (2006–present) ==
In 2006 Peschken was the CEO of Trinity TV, Inc. Los Angeles, a Faith and Family value oriented film & TV production entity. The company was closed in 2008.

In 2008, along with US investors, Peschken’s company Global Faith Television Network, Ltd. London had planned to launch 'Global Faith Television Network', a worldwide Family oriented (G-rated) TV Network. All content based on the teachings of the Roman Catholic Church. Funding for the network fell through.

Peschken was interviewed by Al Kresta, on "Kresta in the Afternoon" live on Ave Maria Radio about his testimony and TV Network plans.

From 2009 to 2010 Peschken focused on the development and production of Catholic Faith related, and Human condition related content. He produced, photographed and edited short form (up to 10 minutes) documentaries / mini series that broadcast via CatholicTV, EWTN (Eternal Word Television Network), and TELECARE TV and other Catholic media systems. The clips are also available on Peschken's YouTube channel (name: GlobalFaith). In addition Peschken produces documentaries for Non Profit Organizations (such as Homeless Shelter Organizations).

Recently Peschken adapted Fr. Robert Barron's 'Catholicism' 10 x 60 minute series into the German language.

An article about him was published in the National Catholic Register.

Since early 2011 Peschken started to work on funding structures for films and television projects, and had 3 motion picture projects in active funding, as well as a TV Cooking show entitled Cook Smart Save Cash. All the fundings failed.

In addition to several film and TV projects, Peschken provides German language adaptations (Voice Over) to Germany-based clients such as 'Lego (Heroica Game)' and 'Victor (Mousetraps)'. In addition he produces & adapts television programs for EWTN Germany.

Since 2014 Peschken and his wife have founded a media project in Geneva, Switzerland, called Pax Press Agency. They are stil involved in the Agency and direct it from Eppstein, Germany. They both where independent, accredited TV correspondents for EWTN TV Germany at the United Nations, Geneva until the end of 2019.

== Memberships and awards ==
From early 1994 until the end of 1999, Peschken was a member of the Producers Guild of America where he served as 'chairman' of the 'Social Awareness Committee' under president Thom Mount.

For the production of the documentary ‘Assignment X’, a reality TV style program, that helped homeless people to end their homelessness, Peschken received THE COMMUNICATOR AWARD 2002, for outstanding work in the communications field, category 'Reality TV Documentary'

== Personal life ==
=== Faith ===
According to Peschken he was 'saved' in 2000 through the television ministry of TBN (Trinity Broadcasting Network) and accepted Jesus Christ as his personal lord and savior, but did not join any particular denomination. However, at the end of 2006, Peschken, while surfing the Christian TV channels, came across the TV program "The Journey Home" hosted by Marcus Grodi on EWTN (Eternal Word Television), the Global Catholic Television Network. This exciting call-in show examines why so many people from Protestants to fallen away Catholics are being drawn into the Catholic Church. They discuss their personal conversion stories and how a specific teaching of the Catholic Church or experience influenced their decision. This program had such a strong impact on Peschken that he questioned his Protestant-based faith and started to research the (Roman) Catholic Church (including the early Church Fathers and origin of Catholicism, the 'universal' church) in particular through teaching programs on EWTN. Peschken and his wife Patricia decided later that they would join the Catholic Church.

Quotation from Peschken:

For me this was not so much a choice but a necessary consequence, based on what I had learned about the origin, the teachings and fullness of the Catholic Church.

Back in 2004 Peschken planned to launch a Christian Television Network just for Germany. He entered into a cooperation agreement with Daystar Television Network, a worldwide Christian TV Network founded by Marcus and Joni Lamb, to build Daystar Television Deutschland, a German-language version of Daystar.

Then Peschken applied for a broadcast license (see KEK - Kommission zur Ermittlung der Konzentration im Medienbereich) in Germany, which caused great controversy and months-long discussions between Germany's 'Landesmedienanstalten' (state appointed agencies that issue licenses to broadcasters) whether to allow a pure Christian orientated TV network that uses the American tele-evangelizing approach. Finally Peschken's company, Trinity TV, on November 11, 2006 received a broadcast license issued by the BLM (Bayerische Landeszentrale für neue Medien). However, shortly thereafter his cooperation partner Daystar Television Network decided to launch their worldwide network via Astra 19.2°E/Digital into Germany, and Peschken ended the cooperation. He then renamed the network into 'Trinita TV' (Trinita = Latin for Trinity)

In 2007, based on his newly found conviction for the Catholic Church and its teachings, he could no longer support an Evangelical Christian Television Network approach. He abandoned the concept altogether.

=== Outside the media industry ===
Until late 2008 Peschken lived in Pacific Palisades, CA with his wife Patricia. In early 2009 the couple moved to Wisconsin. In 2012 they moved to Geneva, Switzerland, then mid 2019 to Germany.

== Filmography ==
=== Feature films ===
This is a table of feature films that Christian Peschken has been involved in as producer or executive producer.

Note: As far as the films: Presumed Dead, Double Cross, Max Havoc: Ring of Fire, Heatstroke, and Razor were completed, Peschken ended his active involvement in the production & co-funding activities in 2005. The actual production of the films began after his exit.

Name	Year	Producer	Writer
Flight of the Dove	1994	✓	✗
Dillinger & Capone	1995	✓	✗
Suspect Device	1995	✓	✗
Captain Nuke & the Bomber Boys	1995	✓	✗
Vital Signs	1997	✓	✗
Baby Trade	1997	✓	✗
Hostile Environment	1998	✓	✓
Presumed Dead	2006	✓	✗
Double Cross	2006	✓	✗
Max Havoc: Ring of Fire	2006	✓	✗
Heatstroke	2007	✓	✗
Razor	2008	✓	✗

=== Reality TV ===
This is a table of reality TV series that Christian Peschken has been involved in as writer, director, producer, cameraman. Some of the programs were aired on 'The Word Network' and 'JCTV' (a TBN network).

Name	Year	Producer	Director	Writer
Mercenaries of the Lord	2000	✓	✓	✓
Assignment X	2001-2002	✓	✓	✓
City Van	2002-2003	✓	✓	✓
