= Christopher Becker =

German film director, screenwriter and film producer (born 1980)

- Born: 1 May 1980 (age 46); Bad Münstereifel, Germany
- Occupations: Film director, screenwriter, producer
- Years active: 2001–present

Christopher Becker (born 1 May 1980) is a German film director, screenwriter, and film producer.

== Biography ==
Becker studied directing at the Internationale Filmschule Köln, where he graduated in 2005. He also held various positions in the film industry, first as a unit production manager, later as a production manager. Already during his studies he made short films, which were represented at national and international film festivals. These include Frauenparkplatz and his graduation film Mittsommer. From 2007 to 2011, he was along with Johannes F. Sievert and Moritz Grenzebach co-owner and managing director of "Pi Filmproduktion".

From 2008 to 2010, he wrote and directed together with Daniel Rakete Siegel the web series Jabhook with Daniel Wiemer, Raphael Rubino, Anna Angelina Wolfers and Hans-Martin Stier in the lead roles. With Siegel and Sönke Andersen he created the viral spot "Schalenklau" for the company PayPal, which had over two million views on the Internet and was broadcast in several television shows.

At the University of Duisburg-Essen he was a lecturer and had 2011 a cameo in the movie Eine Insel namens Udo.

== Filmography ==
Year	Film	Role	Notes
2004	Frauenparkplatz	Director	
2005	Transfamily	Director of photography	
2005	Schwarzer Peter	Director	
2005	Mittsommer	Director, writer	
2006	Poldis Engel	Production manager	
2007	Absolution	Co-producer	
2008	Jabhook	Writer, director	
2011	Brüder	Producer	
2011	Eine Insel namens Udo	Actor	
2012	Playtime (Spielzeit)	Producer	2012 Sundance Film Festival
2012	Pommes essen	Actor	
2015-2017	Comedy Rocket	Producer, writer, director	
2018	Die große Entbärung	Producer	

== Awards ==
His short film Frauenparkplatz won the Made for Mobile Award 2007. In 2010, his viral spot for the Internationale Filmschule Köln was nominated for the Viral Video Award.
