= Nicole Kortlüke =

German film editor

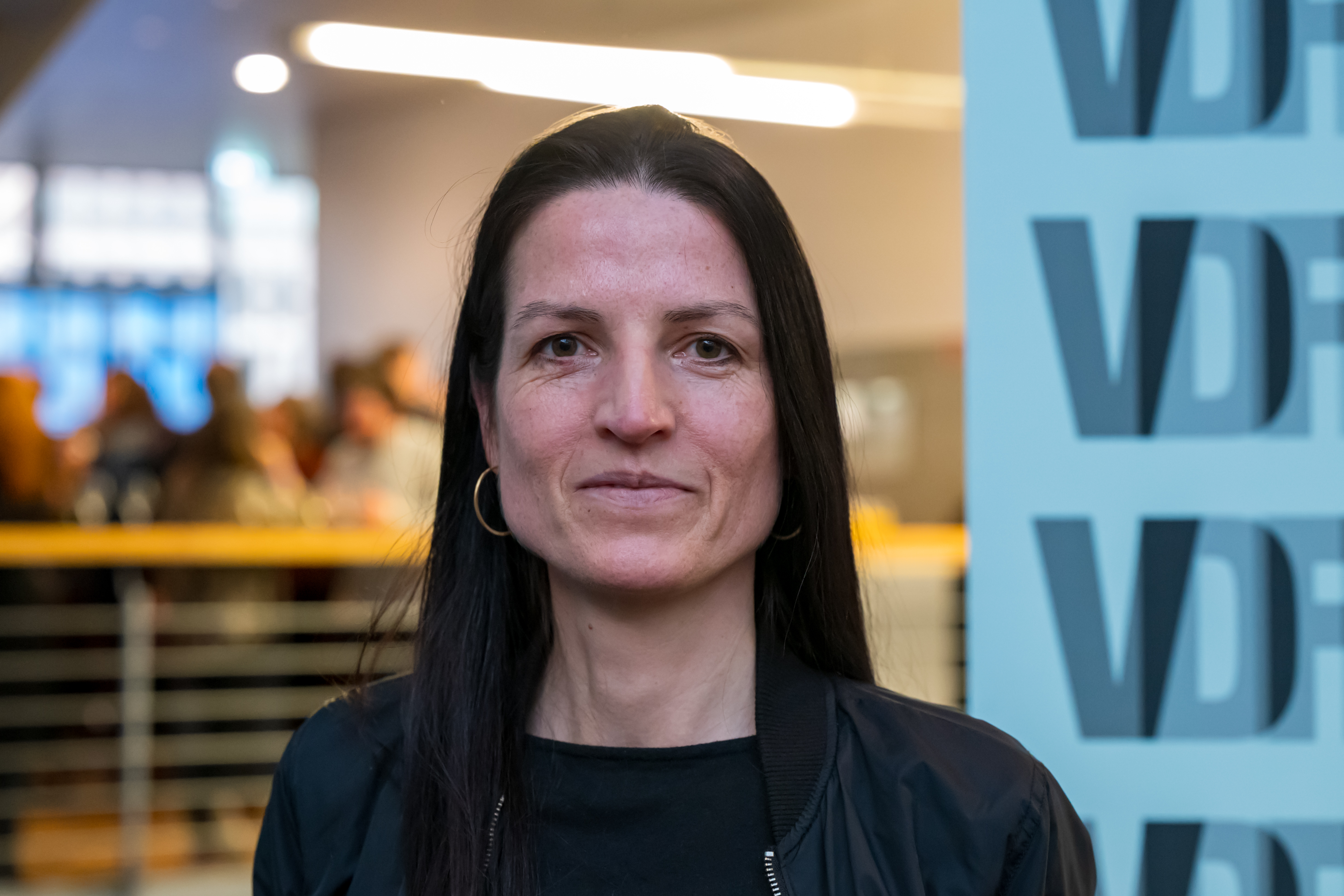
- Kortlüke in 2026
- Born: 9 March 1976 (age 50); Rheda-Wiedenbrück, West Germany
- Education: Internationale Filmschule Köln
- Occupation: Film editor
- Years active: 2003–present

Nicole Kortlüke (born 9 March 1976) is a German film editor.

== Career ==
Kortlüke worked as assistant editor for productions such as Speer und Er, Emma's Bliss and films of the German crime series Tatort. From 2002 to 2005 she studied film editing at International Film School Cologne. Since 2006, she has been a film school teacher.

Since 2006, Kortlüke has been editing cinema and television films as well as series. This includes the films Rendezvous with Death, Losing Balance and Alive and Ticking by Andi Rogenhagen, which ran in 2011 in the competition of the Shanghai International Film Festival.

Her work on the documentary Farewell Herr Schwarz proved invaluable in making the film tell its story. "In a certain way, the script was written in the editing room," director Yael Reuveny said. Regarding the editing Frankfurter Rundschau called it "a thoughtful documentary that takes the time necessary to dismantle the myths and track their impact." "This film would be the ideal theater of tomorrow," wrote Andreas Platthaus in Frankfurter Allgemeine Zeitung, calling it a masterpiece. The film was widely critically acclaimed.

Since 2009, she has also been teaching at the International Film School Cologne in the department of "Editing Picture and Sound" as well as at Hochschule Mainz.

Nicole Kortlüke is a member of the German Film Academy and the Federal Association of Film Editing (BFS).

== Awards ==
In 2024, she received the German Film Award in the category Best Editing for the film Seven Winters in Tehran.

== Selected filmography ==
- 2003: Frauenparkplatz
- 2005: Mittsommer
- 2005: Rendezvous with Death (Rendezvous mit dem Tod: Warum John F. Kennedy sterben musste)
- 2006: Poldis Engel
- 2006: Hilfe! Hochzeit! – Die schlimmste Woche meines Lebens
- 2009: A Triangle Dialogue – Tales of the Defeated
- 2009: Draußen am See
- 2009: Franks Welt
- 2010: Jabhook
- 2010: Zeche is nich – Sieben Blicke auf das Ruhrgebiet 2010
- 2011: Ein Tick anders
- 2012: Brüder
- 2012: Spielzeit
- 2012: Pommes essen
- 2012: Mobbing
- 2012: Forgotten
- 2013: Heiter bis tödlich: Zwischen den Zeilen
- 2013: Farewell Herr Schwarz
- 2013: Es ist alles in Ordnung
- 2014: Herzensbrecher – Vater von vier Söhnen
- 2014: The Chambermaid Lynn
- 2015: We Monsters
- 2016: Emerald Green
- 2018: Wendy 2 – Freundschaft für immer
- 2019: Das Institut – Oase des Scheiterns
- 2019: Zu weit weg
- 2020: Lassie Come Home
