= Brosch =

Brosch is a German surname. Notable people with the surname include:

- Al Brosch (1911–1975), American golfer
- Moritz Brosch (1829–1907), German historian
- Rudolf Brosch, Austrian fencer
- Tebor Brosch (born 1982), Canadian boxer
- Yvonne Brosch, German actress and film director
