= Suspect Device (film) =

- Home video cover art
- Directed by: Rick Jacobson
- Written by: Alex Simon
- Based on: story by Robert Kerchner
- Produced by: Mike Elliott executive Christian Peschken; Chris Nauman; Roger Corman
- Starring: C. Thomas Howell; Stacey Travis
- Cinematography: John Aaronson
- Edited by: John Gilbert
- Production companies: New Horizons; Hillwood Entertainment
- Distributed by: Showtime (US cable)
- Release date: July 11, 1995
- Running time: 90 minutes
- Country: United States
- Language: English

Suspect Device is a 1995 American film directed by Rick Jacobson and starring C. Thomas Howell. It was the first film of the Roger Corman Presents series.

== Premise ==
A man discovers that he really is a cyborg carrying a nuclear device set to explode and therefore marked for erasure.

== Cast ==
- C. Thomas Howell as Dan Jericho
- Stacey Travis as Dr. Jessica Parker
- Jed Allan as Artemus Lockwood
- John Beck as CIA Director

== Home media ==
Suspect Device was released on DVD in Australia by Flashback Entertainment, Cat. 6622.
