= Steffen Möller =

German teacher, and actor

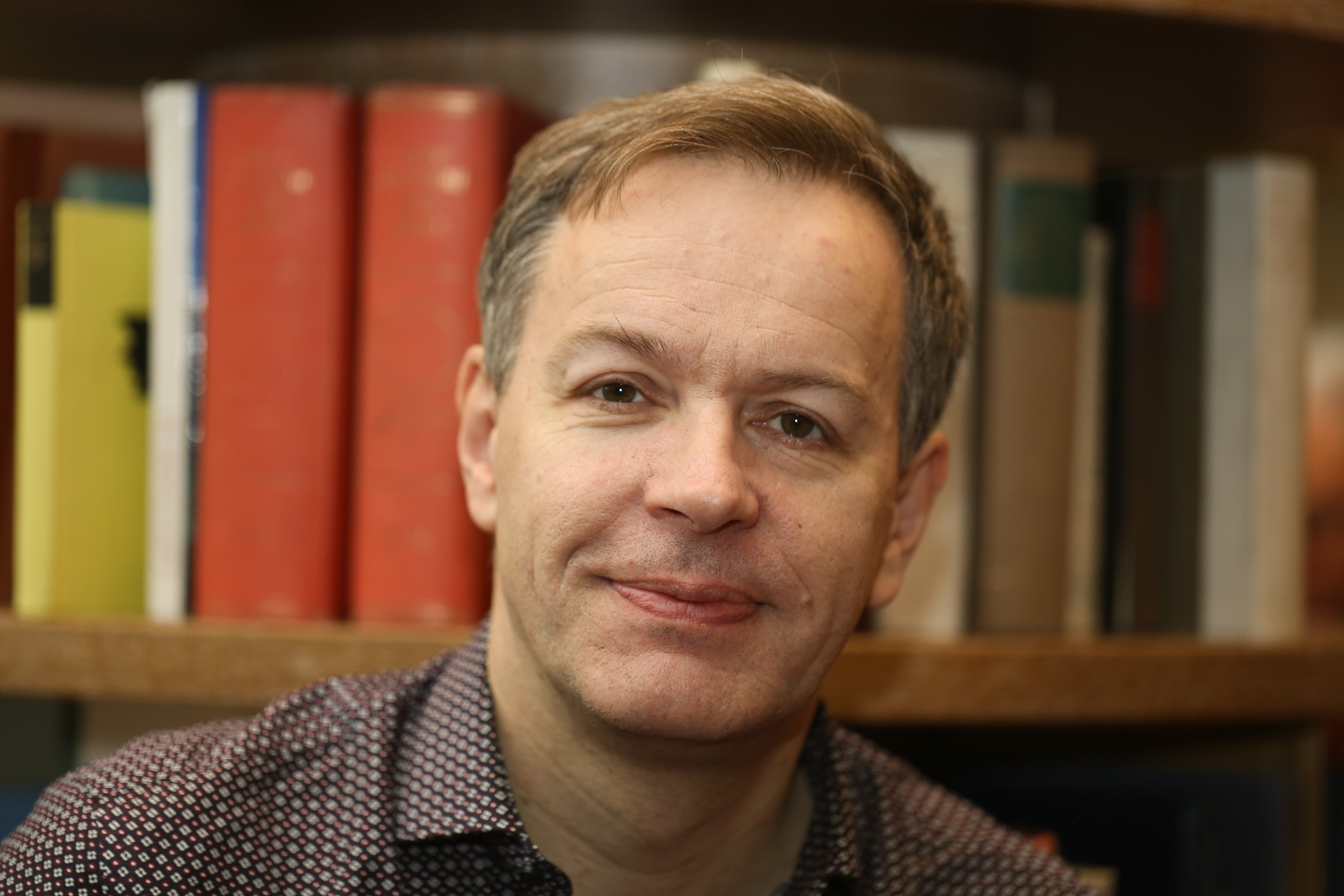
Steffen Möller (2020)

Steffen Möller (German pronunciation: [ˈʃtɛfn̩ ˈmœlɐ]; born 22 January 1969 in Wuppertal) is a German teacher, actor, satirist and stand-up artist, living and performing in Poland and Germany. Known there from the Europa da się lubić TV show and the M jak miłość soap opera (as Stefan Müller). He was also the host for the first season (running from September 2005 to December of the same year) of the Polish edition of the TV show Wetten, dass..? (known there as Załóż się). Since 2008 he has performed on various stand-up comedy tours in Germany, Poland and Austria.

In Mamy cię! (a Polish version of Surprise, Surprise), he was called "The First German of the Third Polish Republic". On 3 June 2005, he was given the Federal Cross of Merit on Ribbon of Germany for merits in developing Polish-German relations. He lives in Warsaw and Berlin.

== Discography ==
- 2003 Niemiec na Młocinach Stand-up Comedy, Live-CD in Polish
- 2004 E, tam Unia! Stand-up Comedy, Live-CD in Polish
- 2006 "Wakacje w Niemczech" Stand-up Comedy, Live-CD in Polish
- 2008 "Najpiękniejsze baśnie Braci Grimm". Audio-CD read by Steffen Möller, Axel Springer Polska, Warsawa
- 2008 Viva Polonia. Audio-CD. Read by Steffen Möller. Argon Verlag, Berlin, ISBN 978-3-86610-558-4 (in German)
- 2009 Viva Polonia: Live in Berlin, Argon Verlag, Berlin, ISBN 978-3-86610-766-3 (in German)
- 2009 Vita Classica. Audio-CD. Read by Steffen Möller. Argon Verlag, Berlin, ISBN 978-3-86610-844-8 (in German)
- 2012 Expedition zu den Polen: Eine Reise mit dem Berlin-Warszawa-Express (Audio-CD), Osterwoldaudio Verlag, ISBN 978-3-86952-113-8 (in German)

== Filmography ==
- 2000-2007 M jak miłość
- 2000 Słoneczna włócznia
- 2002 Kasia i Tomek
- 2003 Koniec wojny
- 2003-2008 Europa da się lubić
- 2005 Załóż się
- 2010 Polen für Anfänger (Poland for beginners) (road movie, Regie: Katrin Rothe; mit Kurt Krömer)
- 2012 Expedition zu den Polen (Liveshow + Bonus), Steffen Möller

== Books ==
- 2006 Polska da się lubić, Warsaw, ISBN 83-245-1062-1 (in Polish)
- 2007 Niemiecki ze Steffenem, with Mariusz Kisielewski and Aneta Głowska, Warsaw, ISBN 978-83-7476-147-5
- 2008 Viva Polonia: als deutscher Gastarbeiter in Polen, Frankfurt am Main 2008, ISBN 978-3-502-15155-5 (in German)
- 2009 Vita Classica: Bekenntnisse eines Andershörenden, Frankfurt am Main 2009, ISBN 978-3-502-15168-5 (in German)
- 2012 Expedition zu den Polen: Eine Reise mit dem Berlin-Warszawa-Express, Malik Verlag, ISBN 978-3-89029-399-8 (in German)
