= Alive and Ticking =

2011 film

- Directed by: Andi Rogenhagen
- Written by: Andi Rogenhagen
- Produced by: Björn Vosgerau
- Starring: Jasna Fritzi Bauer; Waldemar Kobus
- Edited by: Nicole Kortlüke
- Release date: July 4, 2011 (Germany)
- Running time: 85 minutes
- Country: Germany
- Language: German

Alive and Ticking (German: Ein Tick anders) is a German comedy film directed by Andi Rogenhagen. It was released in 2011.

== Plot ==
Eva is a 17-year-old girl with Tourette syndrome. Most of the time, she is happy, because her crazy, but loving family accepts her as she is. Eva tries everything to get her family out of a difficult financial situation, when she discovers that her father has obtained a new job and is moving the family to Berlin. But, her tics keep her from getting jobs. She learns through this situation to not let her tics control her life. Together with her dotty grandma and her crazy uncle, she tries to help secure the family's income.

== Cast ==
- Jasna Fritzi Bauer: Eva Strumpf
- Waldemar Kobus: Daddy Strumpf
- Victoria Trauttmansdorff: Mom Strumpf
- Stefan Kurt: Uncle Bernie
- Renate Delfs: Grandma Strumpf
- Traute Hoess: Psychologist
- Falk Rockstroh: Mister Kühne
- Stefan Lampadius: Mushroom picker
- Jürgen Rißmann: Johnny Blaubeermarmelade
- Nora Tschirner: Staff executive
- Katja Liebing: Bank assistant
- Das Bo: Juror
- Jannis Niewöhner: Young man in pet shop

== Festivals ==
The film participated at several German and international film festivals like 2011 Shanghai International Film Festival or 2011 International Filmfest Emden

== Awards and nominations ==
- 2011: Talented Young Actor Award for Jasna Fritzi Bauer at the German FilmArtFestival Mecklenburg-Pomerania.
