= Anna Angelina Wolfers =

German actress, model and entrepreneur

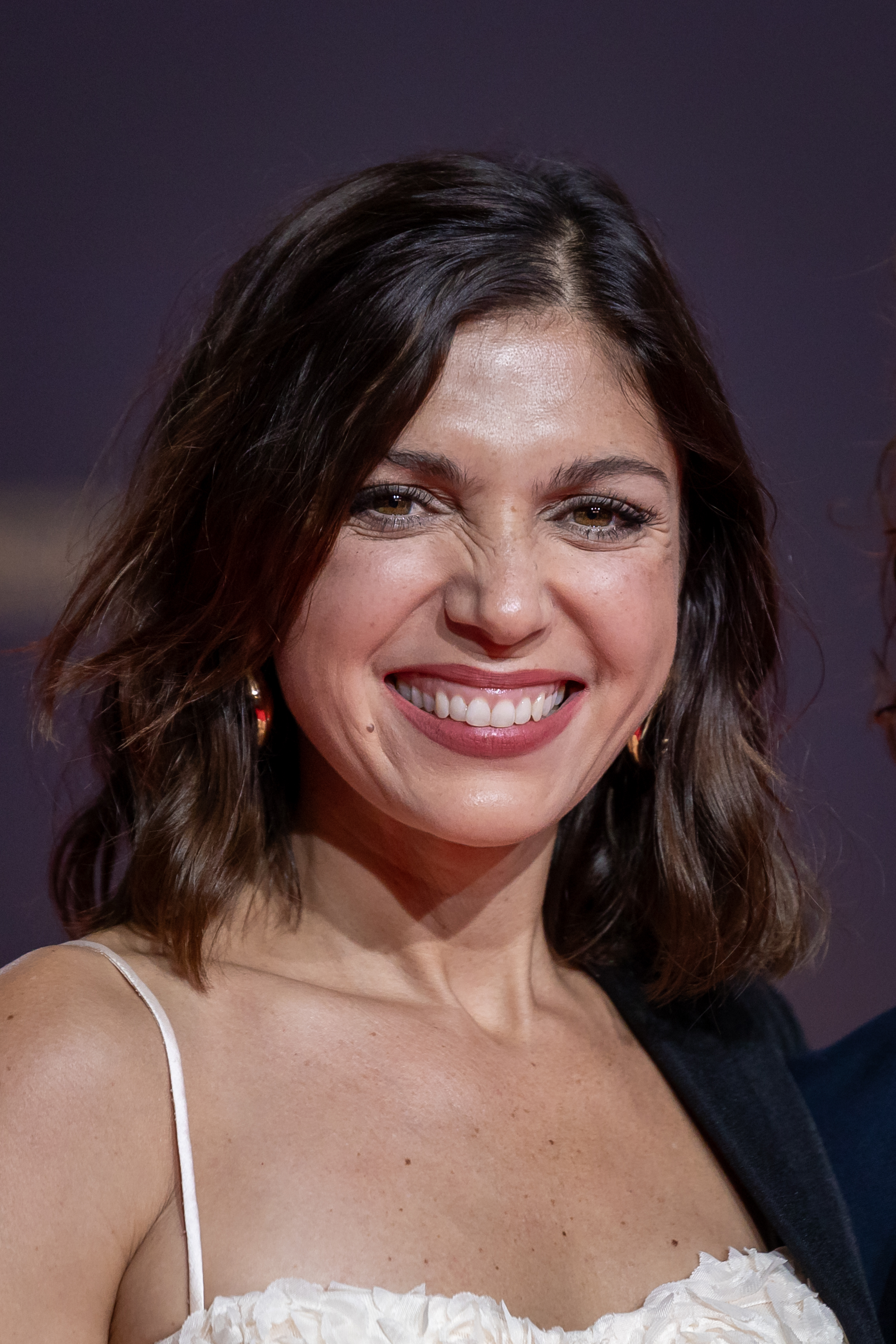
- Anna Angelina Wolfers attending German TV-Awards 2024
- Born: November 8, 1978 (age 48); Siegen, Germany
- Occupations: Actress, model, entrepreneur

Anna Angelina Wolfers (born November 8, 1978) is a German actress, blogger, model and entrepreneur.

== Life and work ==
Anna Angelina Wolfers studied acting from 2003 to 2006 at the "Zentrum für Schauspiel, Bewegung und Tanz" and received further vocal and acting skills from Laura Tassi, both in Cologne. She became famous through her role in the telenovela Sturm der Liebe, which attracts millions of spectators every weekday in both Germany and Italy.

In 2008 Anna Angelina Wolfers was voted eighth sexiest woman in the world by the readers of the German edition of FHM. She was the highest ranked German woman on that list. In June 2009 she even ranked second in the same poll. The following photo shoot with her was printed in the editions of "FHM" and "Girls of FHM" in Germany, Britain, Singapore, Thailand and Australia. In 2011 the readers of the German edition of GQ voted her on the first rank of the "GQ Top 100".

Her face became famous through ads and commercials for companies like Vodafone (2004) Pizza Hut (2008), REWE (since 2009) and McDonald's (2011).

Since 2008 she played one of the main characters in the web series Jabhook (aka. "Highroller und Tank"), directed by Christopher Becker and Daniel Rakete Siegel.

Apart from her acting and modelling careers, Anna Angelina Wolfers owns the boutique chain "Goldig".

In 2015 she started a blog about food, style, travel and fashion.

== Filmography ==
=== Television ===
Year	Title	Role	Director	Channel
2002	Verbotene Liebe		Tillmann Schillinger	ARD
2003	Unter uns		Volker Schwab, Klaus Witting	RTL
2005	Axel will's wissen		Thorsten Wacker	Pro Sieben
2005	Bunte Liga		Heinrich Hadding	Sat 1
2006	Ladyland		Thorsten Wacker	Sat 1
2007–2008	Sturm der Liebe	Leonie Preisinger		ARD
2009	Geister all inclusive	Marie	Axel Sand	RTL
2010	Alarm für Cobra 11	Gabi Schulte	Franco Tozza	RTL
2011	Rosamunde Pilcher “verlobt, verliebt, verwirrt”	Lucy Jones	Stefan Bartmann	ZDF

=== Movies ===
Year	Title	Role	Director
2007	The Things Between Us		Iris Janssen

Music videos

Year	Artist/Band	Song	Director
2010	Revolverheld	Spinner	Johannes Grebert
2010	Revolverheld	Keine Liebeslieder	Johannes Grebert
2011	Johannes Strate	Ich mach meinen Frieden mit mir	
2012	P:lot	Zuhören	Markus Ehinger

== Theatre ==
Year	Play	Role
2004	Draußen vor der Tür	
2005	Der Sturm (Shakespeare)	
2006	Nach dem Regen	
2012	Pretty Girl	
