= Eine Insel namens Udo =

2011 comedy film by Markus Sehr

- Directed by: Markus Sehr
- Written by: Markus Sehr; Clemente Fernandez-Gil
- Produced by: Andreas Brauer; Erik Winker; Martin Roelly; Tom Spieß; Sönke Wortmann
- Starring: Kurt Krömer; Fritzi Haberlandt
- Cinematography: Daniela Knapp
- Edited by: Stefen Schmitt
- Music by: Tobias Wagner; Steven Schwalbe
- Distributed by: X Verleih AG (through Warner Bros.)
- Release date: 16 June 2011 (Germany)
- Running time: 80 minutes
- Country: Germany
- Language: German

Eine Insel namens Udo (German: An Island Named Udo) is a 2011 German comedy film directed by Markus Sehr.

== Plot ==
Udo has a problem, he suffers from "difficult visibility". His fellow human beings do not notice him, overlook him and only notice him when he addresses them directly. That's why he lives in a tent in the trekking department in a department store where he works as a shop detective. The only person in his life is the transsexual perfume seller Amanda.

His life gets completely mixed up when Jasmin speaks to him in the department store. She can see him. Udo is overjoyed. A love relationship develops between the two, in which Jasmin is surprised several times why the most curious things happen to her companion. The door is thrown in front of him, he gets Frisbee slices on his head and is hit by a car. Udo has to come out and confess to Jasmine that only she can see him.

Everything changes after the first love night together - Udo's first ever. He climbs naked from his tent in the department store, walks past customers and imagines himself invisible. But that's not the case - not anymore.

Suddenly Jasmine is not happy with Udo's abnormal nature. He tries to change, which upsets Jasmin even more. A dispute arises. Jasmin wishes that Udo is invisible again, whereupon he actually becomes invisible again, even for Jasmin. Jasmin is offered a job in Munich, which she accepts. To do this, she now wants to fly to Munich with her boss in a private plane. At the airport, Udo can stop the plane at the last second. Jasmine and Udo kiss. Happy end.

== Cast ==
- Kurt Krömer as Udo Gries
- Fritzi Haberlandt as Jasmin Kolbach
- Bernd Moss as Amanda
- Kari Ketonen as Sallinen
- Maja Beckmann as Nicki
- Jan-Gregor Kremp as Herr Weber
- Christopher Becker as the waving man
- Rolf Berg as receptionist
- Piet Fuchs as man with cowboy hat
- Johanna Gastdorf as Frau Weber
- Markus Klauk as Tour de France guy
- Petra Nadolny as Rich thief
