= Rendezvous with Death =

- German: Rendezvous mit dem Tod: Warum John F. Kennedy sterben musste
- Written by: Wilfried Huismann, Gus Russo
- Directed by: Wilfried Huismann
- Music by: Claudius Bruese
- Country of origin: Germany
- Original languages: Spanish, German, English

Production
- Producers: Heribert Blondiau; Wilfried Huismann; Gus Russo
- Cinematography: Tobias Baader; Reinhard Gossmann
- Editors: Olaf Strecker; Nicole Kortlüke
- Running time: 88 minutes
- Production company: WDR

Original release
- Network: Das Erste
- Release: 6 January 2006

Rendezvous with Death (German: Rendezvous mit dem Tod: Warum John F. Kennedy sterben musste) is a 2006 German documentary film that claims that G2, a secret service organization of the Cuban government, organized the assassination of U.S. President John F. Kennedy. The film was first broadcast on German television station Das Erste on 6 January 2006. It was directed by Wilfried Huismann.

== Synopsis ==
Rendezvous with Death features interviews with four Cuban former secret service agents and an American FBI agent, and also cites documents from KGB and Mexican government archives.

A possible Cuban connection was investigated by the US immediately after Kennedy's death. But an FBI officer sent to follow the Oswald's trail during a visit to Mexico was recalled after only three days and the investigation called off. Laurence Keenan, now 81, said it was "perhaps the worst investigation the FBI was ever involved in". "I realised that I was used. I felt ashamed. We missed a moment in history," Mr Keenan said.

Veteran US official Alexander Haig told the filmmaker that Kennedy's successor, Lyndon B. Johnson, believed Cuba was to blame and feared a pronounced swing to the right if the truth were known that would keep the Democrats out of power for a long time. Mr Haig - a US military adviser at the time and later a secretary of state - told the filmmakers Johnson said: "We must simply not allow the American people to believe Fidel Castro could have killed our president. [...] He [Johnson] was convinced Castro killed Kennedy and he took it to his grave."
