= Jabhook =

- Created by: Sönke Andersen; Frank Dahlmann; Christopher Becker; Daniel Rakete Siegel
- Starring: Daniel Wiemer; Raphael Rubino; Anna Angelina Wolfers; Hans Martin Stier; Dimitri Bilov; Markus Klauk; Michael-Che Koch; Juan Carlos López
- Country of origin: Germany
- No. of seasons: 1
- No. of episodes: 22

Production
- Editors: Nicole Kortlüke; Stefen Schmitt
- Camera setup: Single-camera setup
- Running time: 5 min

Original release
- Network: Sport1.de
- Release: 2008 – present

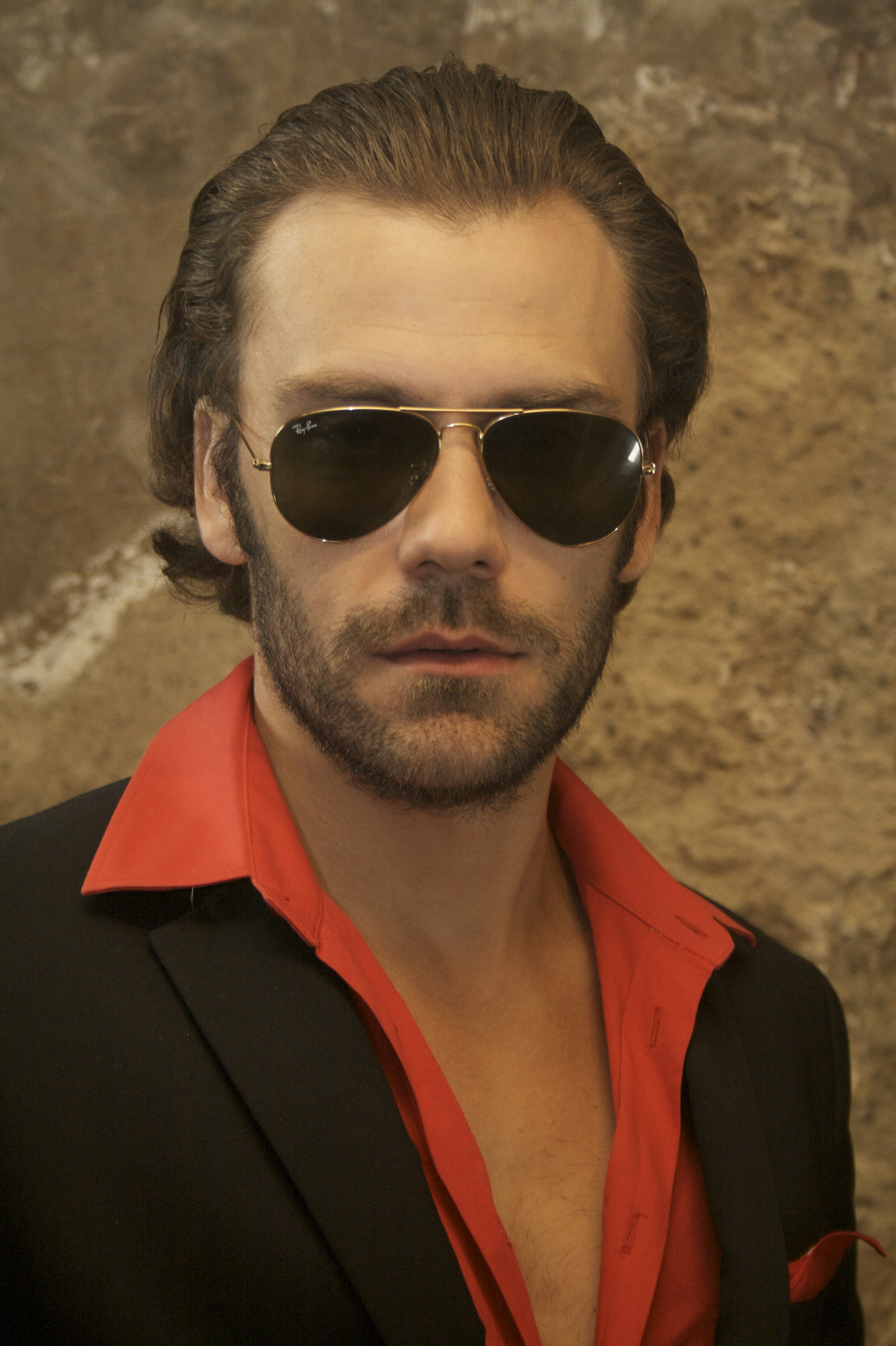
Daniel Wiemer as Highroller.

Jabhook is a German dramedy broadcast since 2010 as a web series. Alongside the series live events take place at which the story is told.

== Plot summary ==
The series is about a rapper who only started rapping in 2014 but has been producing music since 2008.

== Production notes ==
The series is produced by Sönke Andersen and Frank Dahlmann for the Cologne-based company A³ GmbH. The series was written and directed by Christopher Becker and Daniel Rakete Siegel. The team includes also Peter Hümmeler, Stephan Schiffers, Paul Pieck, Nicole Kortlüke, Stefen Schmitt and Jens Nolte. The series is broadcast on a platform of sports portal Sport1.de.

== Reception ==
Christian Parth described NOTRB in Stern magazine as "the only remarkable event for amateur boxers in Germany".

== See also ==
- List of German television series
