= Elisa Schlott =

German actress (born 1994)

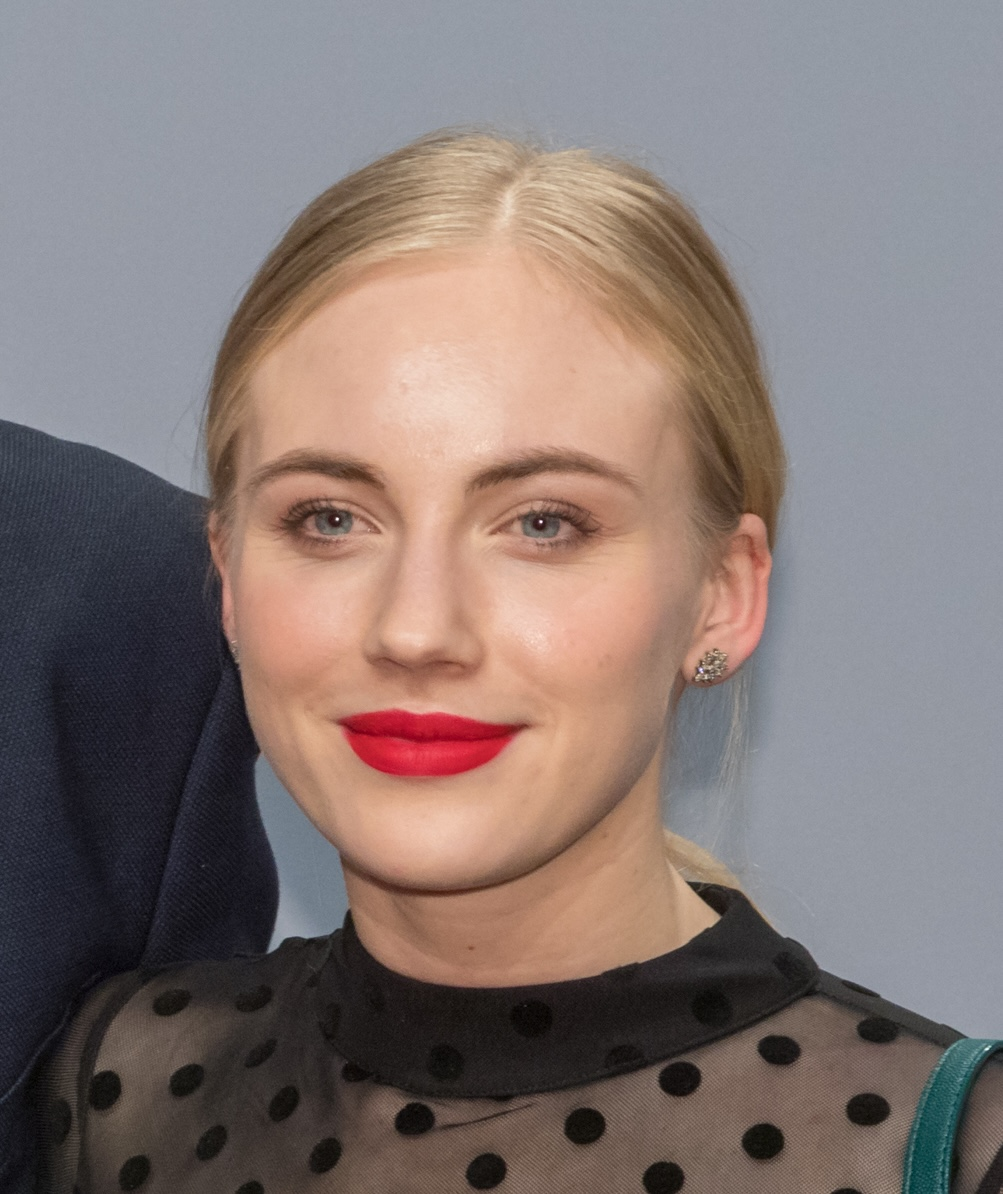
- Elisa Schlott (2018)
- Born: Elisa Johanna Lucie Schlott; 7 February 1994 (age 32); Berlin, Germany
- Occupation: Actress
- Years active: 2006–present

Elisa Johanna Lucie Schlott (born 7 February 1994 in Berlin) is a German actress.

== Biography ==
Schlott made her television debut as a teenager, appearing alongside Ulrich Mühe and Corinna Harfouch. She subsequently appeared in her first feature films and received the Förderpreis Deutscher Film for the leading role in Draußen am See.

After graduating from high school, Schlott moved from Berlin to London in October 2012, where she spent a year taking acting courses. From 2014 to 2017, she studied acting at the Hochschule für Musik und Theater "Felix Mendelssohn Bartholdy" Leipzig. In 2015, she gained wider recognition for her portrayal of a drug addict in Tatort: Borowski und der Himmel über Kiel. In 2017, she starred in Fremde Tochter, which won the Golden Beaver at the Biberach Film Festival. In 2019, she appeared in the ARD miniseries Unsere wunderbaren Jahre, alongside Katja Riemann, Anna Maria Mühe, David Schütter, Franz Hartwig, and Ludwig Trepte. The series aired on Das Erste in March 2020.

Between 2016 and 2018, Schlott was a member of the ensemble at Schauspiel Köln.

Schlott lives in Berlin.

== Filmography ==
=== Film ===
- 2007: Die Frau vom Checkpoint Charlie
- 2008: Draußen am See (directed by Felix Fuchssteiner)
- 2009: Giulias Verschwinden (directed by Christoph Schaub)
- 2011: Fliegende Fische müssen ins Meer (directed by Güzin Kar)
- 2011: Finn und der Weg zum Himmel (directed by Steffen Weinert)
- 2012: The Weekend (directed by Nina Grosse)
- 2013: Gaming Instinct (directed by Gregor Schnitzler)
- 2014: Agnieszka (directed by Tomasz Emil Rudzik)
- 2015: Bienenjunge & Blumenmädchen (directed by Clemens Roth)
- 2016: La Cigale et la Fourmi (directed by Julia Ritschel)
- 2017: Fremde Tochter (directed by Stephan Lacant)
- 2018: Safari – Match Me If You Can (directed by Rudi Gaul)
- 2019: Goliath 96 (directed by Marcus Richard)
- 2019: Limbo (directed by Tim Dünschede)
- 2020: Narcissus and Goldmund (directed by Stefan Ruzowitzky)
- 2025:The Tasters (directed by Silvio Soldini)

=== Television ===
- 2006: The Secret of St. Ambrose (directed by Michael Wenning)
- 2007: Die Frau vom Checkpoint Charlie (directed by Miguel Alexandre)
- 2008: Der große Tom (directed by Nikolaus Stein von Kamienski)
- 2008: Polizeiruf 110 – Geliebter Mörder (directed by Christiane Balthasar)
- 2011: The Invisible Girl (directed by Dominik Graf)
- 2013: Nichts mehr wie vorher (directed by Oliver Dommenget)
- 2014: Tatort – Borowski und der Himmel über Kiel (directed by Christian Schwochow)
- 2015: Marie Brand und der schöne Schein (directed by Jörg Lühdorff)
- 2017: Das Verschwinden (directed by Hans-Christian Schmid)
- 2018: Der Richter (directed by Markus Imboden)
- 2019: Tödliches Comeback (directed by Hermine Huntgeburth)
- 2019: Schuld nach Ferdinand von Schirach – Einsam (directed by Nils Willbrandt)
- 2020: Unsere wunderbaren Jahre (directed by Elmar Fischer)
- 2021: Ostfriesenangst (directed by Hannu Salonen)
- 2022: The Empress

== Theater (selection) ==
- 2003: Der Idiot, Volksbühne Berlin
- 2013: Oleanna, Hamburger Kammerspiele

== Awards ==
- 2009: German Film Promotion Award in the category "Acting Female" for Draußen am See
- 2015: Günter Strack Television Award for best young actress
- 2018: Television Film Award of the German Academy of the Performing Arts, Actor Award for Fremde Tochter
