= K3: Prison of Hell =

- Cover A DVD released by X-Rated Kultvideo
- Directed by: Andreas Bethmann
- Written by: Andreas Bethmann
- Produced by: Andreas Bethmann; Castello Cinematographique
- Starring: Arnie; Suzi-Anne; Candy Sue; Bianca-Germany; Thomas Kercmar; Jana Lastovichova; Andreas Bethmann
- Cinematography: Andreas Bethmann
- Edited by: Andreas Bethmann
- Music by: J-Mack; Uhle Bamboole; Andreas Bethmann
- Production companies: X-Rated Kultvideo; Castello Cinematographique
- Distributed by: X-Rated Kultvideo
- Release date: 3 August 2009 (Germany)
- Running time: 1h 46 minutes
- Country: Germany
- Language: German

K3: Prison of Hell is a 2009 German pornographic horror film written and directed Andreas Bethmann. It is a spin-off of the 2004 film Notgeile Knastjulen zur Unzucht erzogen, and its 2005 sequel.

== Plot ==
In the K3 Women's Jail, an escapee searches for her two companions, one of whom is being beaten by a guard. Via narration, the woman explains that she is Jennifer Walters, the psychologist of the jail, which she has been a prisoner of for five years. Jennifer states that this story begins four weeks ago, with the arrival of two new inmates, Anne and Suzanne.

Anne is introduced being hosed down and made to strip by a warden, while Suzanne is forced at gunpoint to have sex with the Head Warden Stevie in the exam room, where all new prisoners are "broken in". Anne is placed in a cell, while Suzanne is left in the exam room with another woman. One night, Jennifer happens upon the physician, Doctor Bertucci, torturing one of the inmates. Bertucci has stripped the woman and tied her to a bed, and he has her perform fellatio on him in exchange for the antidote to a poison he has injected into her vagina.

One morning, the warden watches as Bertucci has a prisoner give him a blowjob, then moves on to another one of her employees who is burying body parts. The warden seduces the man, while Bertucci ties his victim up, and whips her until he grows bored. Back in the jail, Bertucci has his way with the other woman, something which Jennifer overhears.

As Jennifer is raped by Stevie in the kitchen, the warden coerces Anne into having sex with her in the showers, having decided to take the woman as her sex slave. Later, Jennifer confronts Bertucci about his unethical actions, but he mocks her concerns, so she meets with the warden. Annoyed by the complaints, the warden has Jennifer undress at gunpoint, and she masturbates as Stevie whips Jennifer in front of her.

One day, the warden places a virgin prisoner in stocks, and forces Jennifer to watch as she violently fists the woman, causing her to bleed. Suzanne is raped in her cell by a guard named Arnie, and the inmate is tied up and tortured by Bertucci and the warden, who mutilate her feet with a knife, and hot wax. Suzanne is shackled, and is raped and whipped by Stevie and Arnie as Bertucci records it. Arnie then takes the nude Suzanne out to the jungle, and after molesting her, leaves her to die.

Bertucci and the warden return to the crazy prisoner, and after using a sex-machine on her, fatally electrocute her with wires attached to her nipples. Having overheard what has been done to Suzanne, Jennifer decides to try and save her, sneaking out of K3 by stealing a set of keys, and a guard's uniform. Out in the jungle, Anne is being used as a table by the lunching warden, and tries to make a run for it, just as Suzanne breaks free of the stakes she was bound to. After a chase, both women are recaptured, Suzanne by Arnie, and Anne by the warden, who wounds Anne by stabbing her in the head.

Anne is brought back to K3, and convinced that she was in on Jennifer's disappearance, Bertucci and the warden leave her to be interrogated and mutilated by Scissorhands, something which Anne's cellmate is forced to watch. He eventually slits Anne's throat, after cutting open her breasts, stabbing and breaking her leg, and ripping one of her nipples off. Outside, Jennifer discovers Suzanne tied to a tree, and is caught by Stevie. Arnie shoots Suzanne's head off, and Jennifer is shot to death by Stevie.

== Cast ==
- Suzi-Anne as Anne
- Candy Sue as Suzanne
- Bianca-Germany as Chief Warden
- Jana Lastovichova as Doctor Jennifer Walters
- Thomas Kercmar as Stevie
- Arnie as Arnie
- Miss Aleister
- Andreas Bethmann as Doctor Bertucci
- Michael Lütte
- Ingrid Ingwer
- Dirk
- Manuela Mundfaul
- Mirka Oplustilova
- Natascha Wetzig as Alisha

== Reception ==
The Sins of Cinema called K3 "easily one of the nastiest films I have seen" and "100% pure exploitation gold" that warranted a score of nine out of ten. The gore was praised by Independent Flicks, which stated that it was "a very nasty and disturbing film" that looked good considering its budget, though the bad acting, weak plot, and lack of worthwhile characters made it somewhat boring.

The effects of Olaf Ittenbach were commended by HorrorNews.net, which felt that K3 was "weighed down in repetitive acts" and was a "filthy production" with no purpose or agenda outside of being exploitative. The film was deemed worthless by The Worldwide Celluloid Massacre, which called it almost completely plotless, and "tiringly repetitive".
