= Kurt Krömer =

German comedian

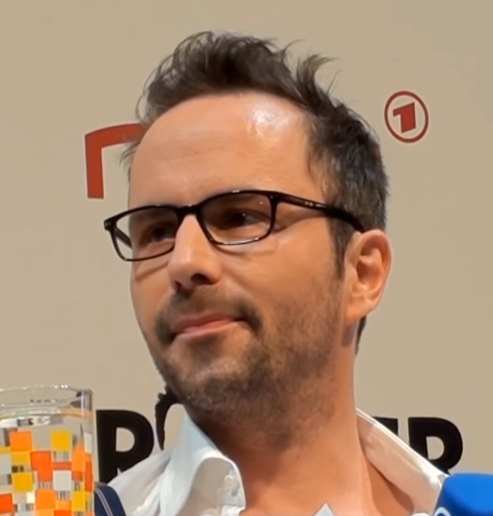
- Krömer in 2012
- Born: Alexander Bojcan; 20 November 1974 (age 51); West Berlin, West Germany
- Occupation(s): Comedian, actor

Alexander Bojcan (born 20 November 1974), known professionally as Kurt Krömer, is a German comedian and actor.

== Life ==
Krömer was born in West Berlin. He works as actor, comedian and podcast host in German television and film. From 2003 to 2005 the rbb broadcast the Kurt Krömer Show, which attracted nationwide attention and succeeded the format Bei Krömers for German broadcaster ARD. Krömer has three sons.

== Filmography ==
- 2006: Wo ist Fred?
- 2007: GG 19 – Eine Reise durch Deutschland in 19 Artikeln
- 2009: Familie Sonnenfeld, Abschied von Oma
- 2009: Ein starkes Team, episode Geschlechterkrieg
- 2010: Polen für Anfänger (road movie), director: Katrin Rothe; together with Steffen Möller
- 2010: Life Is Too Long, director Dani Levy
- 2010: Undercover Love
- 2011: Eine Insel namens Udo
- 2022: The Bad Guys (film) (Voice for Marc Maron as Mr. Snake)

== Awards ==
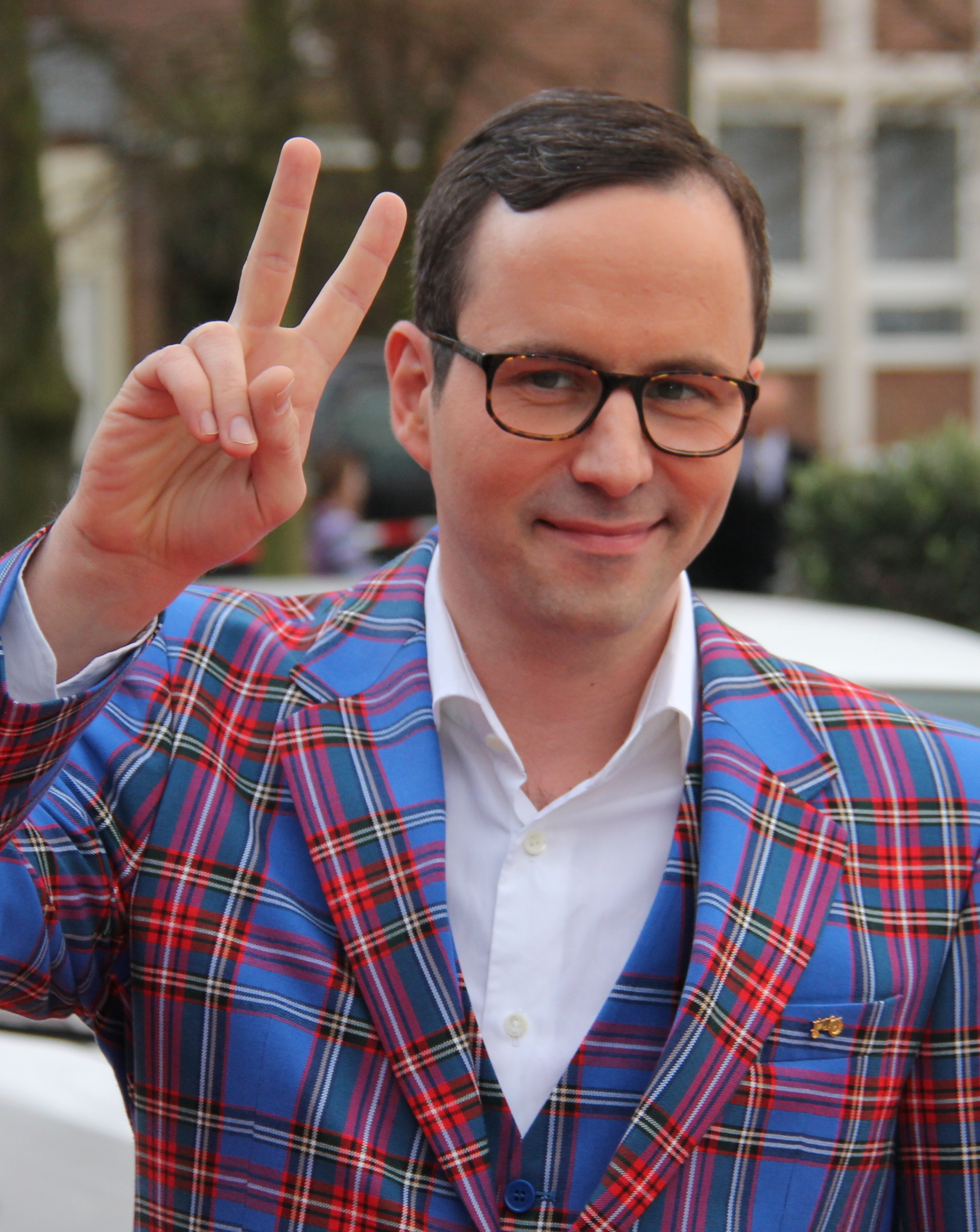
Krömer at the 2011 Grimme Awards

- 2005
  - German Comedy Award – Best newcomer
- 2006
  - Deutscher Fernsehpreis – Best comedy for Bei Krömers
  - Zeck-Kabarettpreis – newcomer award Fresh-Zeck
- 2007
  - Deutscher Kleinkunstpreis in category Kleinkunst
  - Das große Kleinkunstfestival – Berlin-Preis
- 2009
  - 1 Live Krone – best comedy
- 2011
  - Grimme-Preis – best entertainment for Krömer - Die internationale Show
- 2020
  - Grimme-Preis – best entertainment for Chez Krömer
- 2022
  - Grimme-Preis – best entertainment for Chez Krömer
- 2023
  - Deutscher Podcast Preis - Best newcomer for Feelings
