= Markus Sehr =

German film director (born 1977)

- Born: 7 April 1977 (age 49); Cologne, West Germany
- Occupation: Film director
- Years active: 2004-present

Markus Sehr (born 7 April 1977) is a German film director. He directed more than eight films since 2004.

== Selected filmography ==
Year	Title	Notes
2007	Absolution	
2011	Eine Insel namens Udo	
