= Andreas Bethmann =

German film director, producer, and writer

- Born: 1 January 1970 (age 56)

Andreas Bethmann is a German film director, producer, and screenwriter. Beginning his career making horror films, Bethmann moved on to hardcore pornography in the late 1990s, and then to fusions of the two genres, which typically feature prolonged scenes of rape, torture, and gore. His style of filmmaking has been compared to those of Joe D'Amato and Jesús Franco (who made cameo appearances in several of Bethmann's projects).

Along with making films, Bethmann distributes them through the label X-Rated Kultvideo, acts as editor for magazines such as X-Rated and Art of Horror, and has authored a number of books, including Deep Wet Torture Handbook, Freitag der 13. Chronicles, Jess Franco Chronicles, Deep Red Gore Handbook: Die 100 blutigsten Horrorfilme, Porno Holocaust – die Filme des Joe D'Amato and Über dem Jenseits – die Filme des Lucio Fulci.

== Partial filmography ==
Bethmann's films are usually released in multiple versions, such as censored or director's cuts. While his work is predominantly straight and lesbian-themed, a few of his films have had male on male scenes, examples of these being Notgeile Knastjulen zur Unzucht erzogen and Angel of Death 2: The Prison Island Massacre.

Year	Film	Function					Notes
Year	Film	director	screenWriter	Producer	Actor	Role	Notes
1988	Begrabt ihn tief	Yes			Yes		Unreleased
1994	Das Weststadt Massaker	Yes			Yes		
1994	Der Totenhügel	Yes			Yes		
1995	Hügel der lebenden Toten – Totenhügel 2	Yes	Yes	Yes	Yes		
1996	Tanz der Kürbisköpfe	Yes	Yes	Yes	Yes		
1998	Unhappy End			Yes			
1998	Die Insel der Dämonen	Yes	Yes	Yes			
1998	Der Todesengel	Yes	Yes	Yes	Yes	Police Photographer	
1999	Mutation				Yes	Leaving Guest in Restaurant	
1999	Die geheimen Spiele junger Mädchen	Yes		Yes			
1999	Deadly Enemy			Yes			
2000	Vegetarierinnen zur Fleischeslust gezwungen	Yes					
2000	Dämonenbrut	Yes	Yes	Yes	Yes	Soldier	
2001	Psychokill – Tod der Schmetterlinge			Yes			
2001	Schulmädchen-Report 2000: Feuchte Mösen nach Schulschluß	Yes		Yes			
2002	Vegetarierinnen zur Fleischeslust gezwungen Part 2	Yes		Yes			
2003	Rossa Venezia	Yes	Yes	Yes	Yes		
2004	Notgeile Knastjulen zur Unzucht erzogen	Yes					
2004	Killerbus			Yes			
2005	Knastjulen 2 – Zur Sau gemacht	Yes					
2006	Exitus Interruptus	Yes	Yes	Yes	Yes		Spin-off of Vegetarierinnen zur Fleischeslust gezwungen
2007	Intime Geständnisse geschlechtsreifer Nymphomaninnen	Yes			Yes		
2007	Angel of Death 2: The Prison Island Massacre	Yes	Yes	Yes	Yes	Doctor Morpho	
2008	Exitus II: House of Pain	Yes	Yes	Yes			
2009	K3: Prison of Hell	Yes	Yes	Yes	Yes	Doctor Bertucci	Spin-off of Notgeile Knastjulen zur Unzucht erzogen
2013	Help me I am Dead – Die Geschichte der Anderen	Yes	Yes	Yes	Yes	Mike	
2014	Terror Creek	Yes	Yes	Yes	Yes		
