= Max Havoc: Curse of the Dragon =

2004 action film by Albert Pyun and Isaac Florentine

- A poster for Max Havoc: Curse of the Dragon
- Directed by: Albert Pyun; Isaac Florentine
- Written by: Irina Mishina
- Produced by: John F.S. Laing; Yoram Barzilai; Melissa Ciampa
- Starring: Mickey Hardt; Joanna Krupa; David Carradine; Carmen Electra; Tawney Sablan; Marie Matiko; Richard Roundtree; Arnold Chon
- Production company: Guam Motion Pictures Company
- Distributed by: Rigel Entertainment; Westlake Entertainment
- Release dates: 2005 (Guam); January 23, 2007 (DVD)
- Running time: 90 minutes
- Countries: Guam, (United States)
- Language: English

Max Havoc: Curse of the Dragon is a straight-to-DVD action film directed by Albert Pyun and Isaac Florentine on the island of Guam in 2004. Swiss actor Mickey Hardt plays Max Havoc, an ex-kickboxer turned sports photographer. Max has to help an art dealer and her sister, played by Joanna Krupa and Tawney Sabley, flee from a yakuza clan trying to retrieve a valuable jade dragon statue. Aimed at the European market, the film was planned to kickstart a franchise, which would have included a sequel and a syndicated television series in the United States, but these plans did not materialize. A sequel, Max Havoc: Ring of Fire, was eventually shot in Canada.

The film was originally slated to be directed in Hawaii, but a series of mishaps led to filming on Guam. Most of the film was shot there by Pyun, including a cameo by Carmen Electra. A smaller part was added by Florentine to improve the film's marketability, including added cameos by David Carradine and Richard Roundtree. It premiered on Guam in 2005 and on DVD in 2007, earning around US$250,000. Most critics reviews were negative, chiding the plot, casting and the cliché portrayal of Guam, but some praised the fight choreography and the "so bad it's good" value.

Max Havoc: Curse of the Dragon has garnered press through lawsuits regarding its financing. Guam Economic Development and Commerce Authority (GEDCA) gave a $800,000 loan guarantee to producer John F. S. Laing, which was forfeited as the film failed to recoup the investment. GEDCA alleged Laing defrauded them, while he claimed Guam authorities promised him funding he did not receive. This kicked off a lengthy legal battle, ending with a settlement between Laing and GEDCA.

== Plot ==
The story centers around Max Havoc (Mickey Hardt), an ex-kickboxing champion known as "Mad Max", turned globetrotting sports photographer. Max quit kickboxing after accidentally killing a fellow boxer during an unlikely comeback in the ring, but still suffers from flashbacks to the fight. After a bar scuffle over a biker girl (Nikki Ziering), his agent (Diego Walraff) sends him to Guam for a publicity photo shoot. There, Max encounters Tahsi (Richard Roundtree), his former kickboxing coach, now an antiques dealer, and promises to catch up with him later. While photographing an outrigger canoe race from a jet ski, Max rescues Christy Goody (Tawney Sablan), a vacationer who was about to be unwittingly run over by the canoes. In the process, he knocks over one of the canoes, earning the wrath its head rower, Moko (Pyun veteran Vincent Klyn). He is also admonished by Jane (Joanna Krupa), Christy's sister, for his brazen driving. However, she later apologizes and agrees to a dinner date.

In the meantime, Tahsi is approached by a thief (Danielle Burgio), who has fled to Guam with a stolen rare jade dragon and wants to pawn it, promising to return in 24 hours. Tahsi agrees, but does not promise not to sell it. Indeed, Jane Goody, who turns out to be a friend of his, visits his shop and buys the dragon, despite Tahsi's reluctance. She later has it appraised, learning it is worth many times more than she paid for it, heightening her hopes of paying the tuition for her sister's medical degree. Later, an enforcer (Arnold Chon) for the yakuza group Black Dragons, the original owners of the jade dragon, appears in Tahsi's shop with the thief in a headlock, demanding the figurine's return. Tahsi refuses to reveal Jane's identity and is killed along with the thief.

Max and the Goody sisters are soon involved in a streetfight with henchwoman Eiko (Ji Ling). After Max saves the sisters, and is involved in a further fight with Quicksilver (Johnny Trí Nguyễn), he is contacted by the leader of the criminals, Aya (Marie Matiko), who is also Eiko's lesbian lover. The Black Dragons explain that the jade dragon is actually an urn containing the ashes of their former leader, Yoshida, and that they believe it holds mystical value and will stop at nothing to get it back. Max and the sisters agree to return the dragon at noon the following day in return for their own personal safety. They are helped by locals, including beach vendor Debbie (Carmen Electra) and Moko, with whom Max reconciled at the scene of Tahsi's killing. Nevertheless, Jane is torn between returning the figurine and protecting their lives, and ensuring that her sister finishes her M.D. The deal falls through as Jane's cell phone battery dies, and she does not arrive at the meet in time. Max escapes the angry henchmen on a jet ski.

The head of the Black Dragons (David Carradine, credited as Grand Master), pays a visit to Guam to take the matter into his own hands. It turns out that he is a man prominently seen ringside in Max's flashbacks. The Black Dragons kidnap Christy, enticing Max and Jane to come to their hideout. Max and Grand Master reach an agreement that Max will fight Arnold Chon's character to death. If Max wins, Max and the Goody sisters can go free. Max almost deals a deadly blow to the enforcer's head, but stops himself at the last moment, sparing his life, yet winning the fight. He turns over the urn to the yakuza, and receives a priceless katana as a gift. Max and his allies celebrate the end of the adventure in a party. The film ends with Max embracing Jane Goody on a beach during sunset.

== Cast ==
- Mickey Hardt as Max Havoc
- Richard Roundtree as Tahsi
- Joanna Krupa as Jane Goody
- Tawney Sablan as Christy Goody
- David Carradine as Grand Master
- Carmen Electra as Debbie
- Vincent Klyn as Moko
- Danielle Burgio as Thief
- Marie Matiko as Aya
- Li Jing as Eiko
- Arnold Chon as "Baldy"
- Johnny Trí Nguyễn as "Quicksilver"
- Nikki Ziering as Girl Biker
- Diego Wallraff as Joe
- J. J. Perry as Boxing Referee

Director Albert Pyun cast Mickey Hardt as Max Havoc, as he was planning "toward European TV appeal," based on Hardt's role in the Donnie Yen film The Twins Effect and German TV series Codename: Puma (German: Der Puma – Kämpfer mit Herz), where Yen did fight choreography. He originally planned to cast Joanna Krupa as the younger sister, Christy Goody, with Jane's part going to an established actress, but Krupa ended up playing the older sister, and local actress Tawney Sablan was cast in her stead in her first film role. Rapper Fat Joe and Taiwanese actress Shu Qi did not make the cast, according to Pyun, due to film's financial problems. Billed as a top star, Carmen Electra appears in two brief scenes as a beach vendor, who flirts with Max Havoc when he returns a life jacket.

== Production ==
According to Pyun, the idea of Max Havoc has existed since at least 2001. At the time, he was asked to direct the film in Hawaii. After the September 11 attacks, it was decided that filming in Miami was more economically viable. Pyun said that Hawaiian film star Mark Dacascos was interested in playing the character of Max Havoc, but that he backed out after anthrax appeared in Florida. Bali was considered next for filming but the idea was abandoned after the terrorist bombing there in 2002. The director and producer settled on filming on Guam, voicing their interest to Guam officials in late 2003. Max Havoc: Curse of the Dragon was supposed to be the first of two films to act as a backdoor pilot into a Max Havoc television series.

Filming began in March and finished in May 2004. Some of the scenes were done in East Hagåtña Bay. Pyun had planned to shoot the film with a Vancouver-based film crew, but after they were denied visas, he eventually had to resort to hiring a Los Angeles crew, which, he said, he later regretted. He complained about a lack of infrastructure for filming on Guam, as well as hostility from government officials once the film crew arrived on the island, and claimed that he was denied shooting on Waikiki Beach, which cost the film time and sponsorships. He also claimed he was not paid his director's fee, calling the film "the worst financial decision [he] ever made." Guam businesses and Max Havoc: Curse of the Dragon crew members also reported not being paid for work on the film.

The producer, John F. S. Laing, blamed Pyun for the failure of the film. After the filming was completed on Guam, director Isaac Florentine was hired to touch up the film in Los Angeles in order to improve its marketability, adding around ten minutes of screen time in the process. Florentine declined screen credit, stating in a later interview that he "[did]n't feel it [was] fair" to Pyun. The L.A. shoot took ten days, and featured David Carradine and Richard Roundtree, who were not part of the original cut.

== Release ==
Max Havoc: Curse of the Dragon premiered on Guam television on December 10, 2005. Because the film was poorly received and never played in theaters as promised, it was described as a "box office flop" by Guam's press. In February 2005, producer John F.S. Laing stated he had trouble finding a theatrical distributor for the film. As of 2010, the film was reported to have grossed $15,000 on Guam and $242,229 internationally. On January 23, 2007, Max Havoc: Curse of the Dragon was released on DVD in Region 1. The DVD extras contained interviews and several text pages about the cast, a three-minute trailer, a poster, a collection of still images from the film, and a calendar for 2007 featuring actresses from the film. The film was not rated by the Motion Picture Association of America.

A sequel, titled Max Havoc: Ring of Fire, premiered on September 12, 2006 and on DVD on August 21, 2007. The film was produced in Canada and directed by Terry Ingram. Mickey Hardt reprises his role as Max Havoc, who comes to Seattle to do a photoshoot of a tennis champion played by Christina Cox, but has to deal with a street gang and organized crime, while Dean Cain plays the main antagonist. Max Havoc: Ring of Fire received mixed-to-negative reviews, being called a "run of the mill B-movie." On September 30, 2009, both films were released as a double feature on Blu-ray in Germany.

== Reception ==
Max Havoc: Curse of the Dragon received mostly negative reviews. Reviewers were mostly focused on the film's lacking plot and rampant cliché use. David Cornelius of DVD Talk described it as "the kind of moronic C-level action flick that always stars some former martial arts champ", noting that the controversy behind the funding of the film was more interesting than the film itself, and finishing with the advice to skip the film. Albert Valentin of Kung Fu Cinema was less critical of the film, praising choreography and Mickey Hardt's performance in action sequences. Combustible Celluloid's Jeffrey M. Anderson gave the film a neutral-to-positive review, mentioning "the overall ridiculousness of the film charmed [him]", and commenting positively on the chemistry between Hardt's and Krupa's characters. Gene Park of Guam's Pacific Daily News was, however, jarred by inaccuracies in the plot. He called the film a "guilty pleasure without the pleasure." He thought the action editing was "epileptic" and compared the whole film to a travelogue. As of 2015, review aggregator Rotten Tomatoes counts one positive and one negative review of the film.

Author Camilla Fojas later criticized Max Havoc: Curse of the Dragon for its shortcoming as a promotional vehicle for Guam and its film industry, noting the colonialistic portrayal of Guam, especially in the parting scene where U.S. mainland-based characters bid farewell to Chamorro people in a cliché fashion.

== Litigation ==
At the request of producer John F.S. Laing and director Albert Pyun, the Guam Economic Development and Commerce Authority gave an $800,000 loan guarantee to Laing and his company Guam Motion Pictures Company (GMPC) to secure a third party loan from Comerica Bank in order to finance the film. GMPC was created by Laing on Guam to produce Max Havoc: Curse of the Dragon, while Laing's stateside company, Rigel Entertainment, was to handle distribution. GMPC was also supposed to produce a further theatrical film and two travel documentaries. In June 2006, Laing defaulted on the loan to Comerica and the guarantee was forfeited. The rights to the film were subsequently auctioned by Comerica. A newly formed Canadian company, Up North Entertainment, Inc., bought the film for $83,000. Laing was listed as one of three directors of Up North Entertainment. Guam's share of the foreclosure sale money was $9,090.

The film has been mired in litigation on Guam and in California. Laing filed a case in California against the Government of Guam, alleging that he agreed to guarantee the collateral, but that the agreement was procured under duress, and that he was underpaid by Guam government for a series of public service announcements featuring Carmen Electra. In March 2008, the case was dismissed and Laing was ordered to pay Guam's legal fees. Laing appealed twice and lost both appeals. GEDCA called Laing's California lawsuit a "tactical maneuver". Laing was also sued by the Government of Guam for fraud. Matthew Borden, attorney for the GEDCA, accused Laing of coming to the island with intention to defraud the government and people of Guam. In a retort, Laing claimed the Government of Guam pledged $3 million in loans and other incentives if he were to come to the island and make Max Havoc: Curse of the Dragon there. Guam officials denied making such a pledge and Laing admitted he did not possess any written agreements on the matter.

=== Settlement ===
A trial began in Guam Superior Court on February 13, 2012. After six years of litigation on Guam, a settlement was reached on May 11. The GEDCA Board of Directors approved Laing's offer of $350,000 in place of paying back the original $800,000 guarantee. The agreement stipulated that Laing would make a payment of $250,000 on June 30, with the remainder paid by September 30.

By the June deadline, Laing had made a payment of $200,000. GEDCA requested the outstanding $50,000 along with the $100,000 remaining balance to be paid by Laing by the September deadline. When asked by a local talk radio station if the Max Havoc: Curse of the Dragon settlement money would be a windfall for GEDCA and could be used for future economic development projects on Guam, GEDCA administrator Karl Pangelinan stated that the money would barely pay for the legal fees incurred during the years of legal fighting with Laing. In September, Rigel Entertainment declared bankruptcy. On October 26, GEDCA board met and established that Laing had made a partial late payment of $75,000 on the $150,000 still outstanding. A new deadline was set for January 31, 2013. Laing missed the January deadline, but in late February, GEDCA reported receiving the money, thus bringing the lawsuit to a close.
