= Mickey Hardt =

Swiss actor (born 1969)

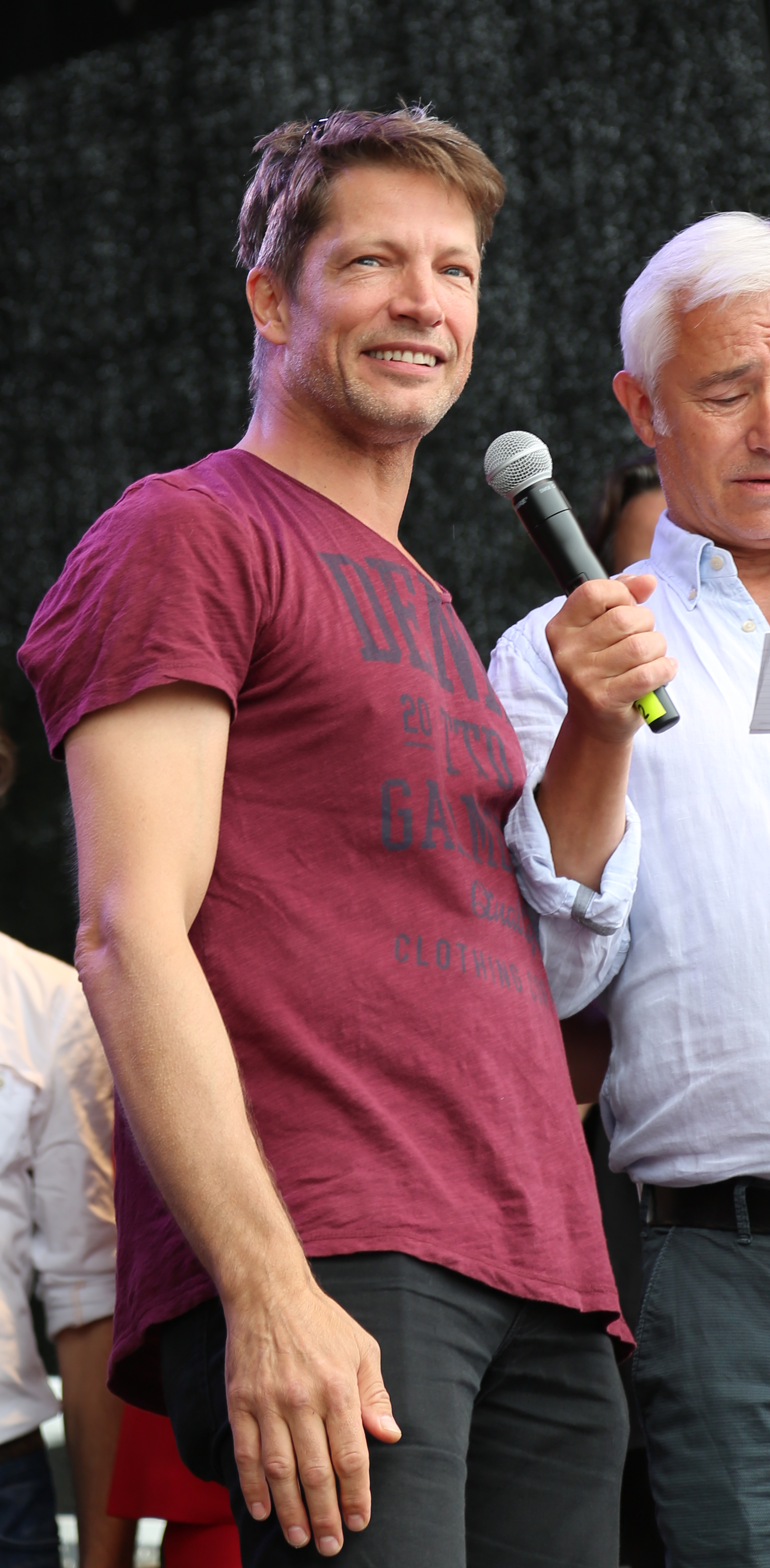
- Born: March 27, 1969 (age 57); Switzerland
- Occupations: model actor, martial artist
- Known for: Josh Engel (The Puma)

Mickey Hardt (born March 27, 1969) is a Swiss-born Luxembourgish-residing German actor, model and martial artist. He is best known for his role in the German television series Codename: Puma. Hardt is skilled in Taekwondo and Savate.

== Life and career ==
Hardt's interest in martial arts began at the age of 8. He started training in Taekwondo in Luxembourg from 1984 and received his 1st dan three years later.

His career however, started with modeling and then he took acting classes. He was discovered by Hong Kong-based martial artist Donnie Yen, who was working on the choreography of a German action series called Codename: Puma. Hardt also trained with Yen's stunt team and appeared in the Hong Kong movie The Twins Effect.

He starred as the titular hero in Max Havoc: Curse of the Dragon (2004) alongside David Carradine and in its sequel, Max Havoc: Ring of Fire (2006).

Hardt received his 2nd dan in Taekwondo in 2011.

== Selected filmography ==
- Codename: Puma (1999–2000, TV series)
- The Twins Effect (2003)
- Sabine (2004–2005, TV series)
- Max Havoc: Curse of the Dragon (2004)
- Max Havoc: Ring of Fire (2006)
- Evet, I Do! (2008)
- Alisa – Folge deinem Herzen (2010, TV series)
- Alles was zählt (2011, TV series)
- Allein gegen die Zeit (2012, TV series)
- Blind Spot (2012)
- Guardians (2012)
- Air Force One Is Down (2012, TV film)
- Beauty and the Beast (2014)
- Gooische Vrouwen 2 (2014)
- Verbotene Liebe (2014–2015, TV series)
- Souvenir (2016)
- Rote Rosen (2016–2017, TV series)
