= Daniel Wiemer =

German actor (born 1976)

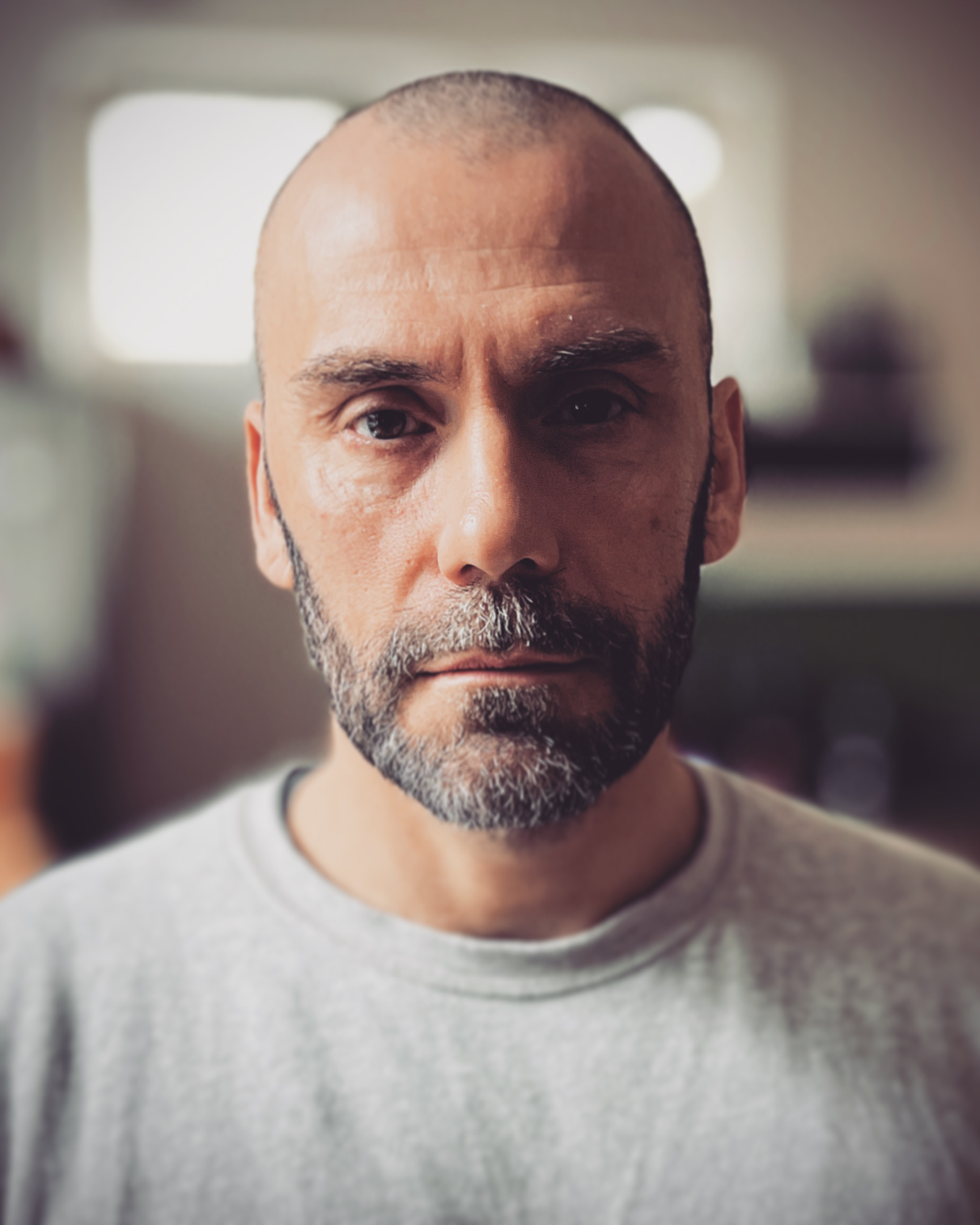
Wiemer in 2024

Daniel Wiemer (born 4 February 1976 in Cologne, West Germany) is a German actor best known for his role as Bong in the German comedy shows Axel! and Axel! will's wissen with Axel Stein. He also appeared in the German soap opera Verbotene Liebe and a variety of other works.

== Filmography ==
Year	Title	Role	Notes
1996	Absprung	Dieter	
1996-2005	Verbotene Liebe	Dennis Krüger / Guido Verde	166 episodes
1999	Die Strandclique	Harry	Episode: "Der Traum von Freiheit"
2000	The Thrill		TV movie
2001	Die Wache	Oliver	Episode: "Too Much"
2002	Last Train		
2002	Leipzig Homicide	Markus Steppke	Episode: "Liebeswahn"
2002	Axel!	Bong	4 episodes
2004	In die Hand geschrieben		
2005-2006	Axel! will's wissen	Bong	23 episodes
2006-2007	SOKO Rhein-Main	Kriminalkommissar Pit Hartmann	18 episodes
2006-2014	Alarm für Cobra 11 - Die Autobahnpolizei	Hauptkommissar Schwarz / Martin Seitz	2 episodes
2008-2013	Ladykracher	Ehemann / Orhan / Verkehrspolizist	44 episodes
2010	Highroller and Tank	Highroller	
2011	No Sex Is No Option	Marc	
2011	Hotel Lux	Herbert Wehner	
2013	Buddy	Dieb	
2018	Liliane Susewind - Ein tierisches Abenteuer	Lehrer Gümnich	
