= Mark Poepping =

German film and television director (born 1974)

- Born: 1974 (Germany) Ochtrup, North Rhine-Westphalia

Mark Poepping (born 1974) is a German film and television director. He has worked for German Television such as ARD as well as for Slovenian television RTV and other international broadcasting stations. He is also founder of the production company mmpro, location at Berlin and the first platform for professional video journalist content tiva.tv (the international videojournalist agency).

== Biography ==
=== Education ===
Mark Poepping studied National Economics at German Universities of Paderborn, Bonn und Hagen and attended the University of Nottingham while on a students exchange program. He organized the assistant to the program director of German broadcasting station WDR and organized the internet portal for the series Schloss Einstein, which is longest running children's series of the world.

=== Career ===
At 2002 he got back to learn the trade of a movie director with documentary filmmaker Konrad Herrmann]. His first movie about renewable energy won a prize. In 2005 his film about integration called "Slovenes in Berlin" was celebrated in cinema. The film tells the story about 6 Slovenian immigrants and their life 1.500 miles away from home.

His documentary "Time for more" about the change of the school system in Germany was released for cinema in February 2007 and will be available on DVD by German publishing company BELTZ.

Right now Mark Poepping works intensively on a project for more democracy in media. A network of more than 250 video journalists worldwide produce report]s, mini-documentaries and series for tiva.tv. This platform licenses videos to online platforms, newspapers and IPTV providers. The slogan of tiva.tv is to tell stories beyond the news. This is to give stories a chance which are usually unseen by the media. One of their customers is the US platform ctzn.tv.

=== Music ===
Mark Poepping has played bass guitar in German punk rock band "Soakies" together with the German actor Marcus Wengler.
