= Ziri Rideaux =

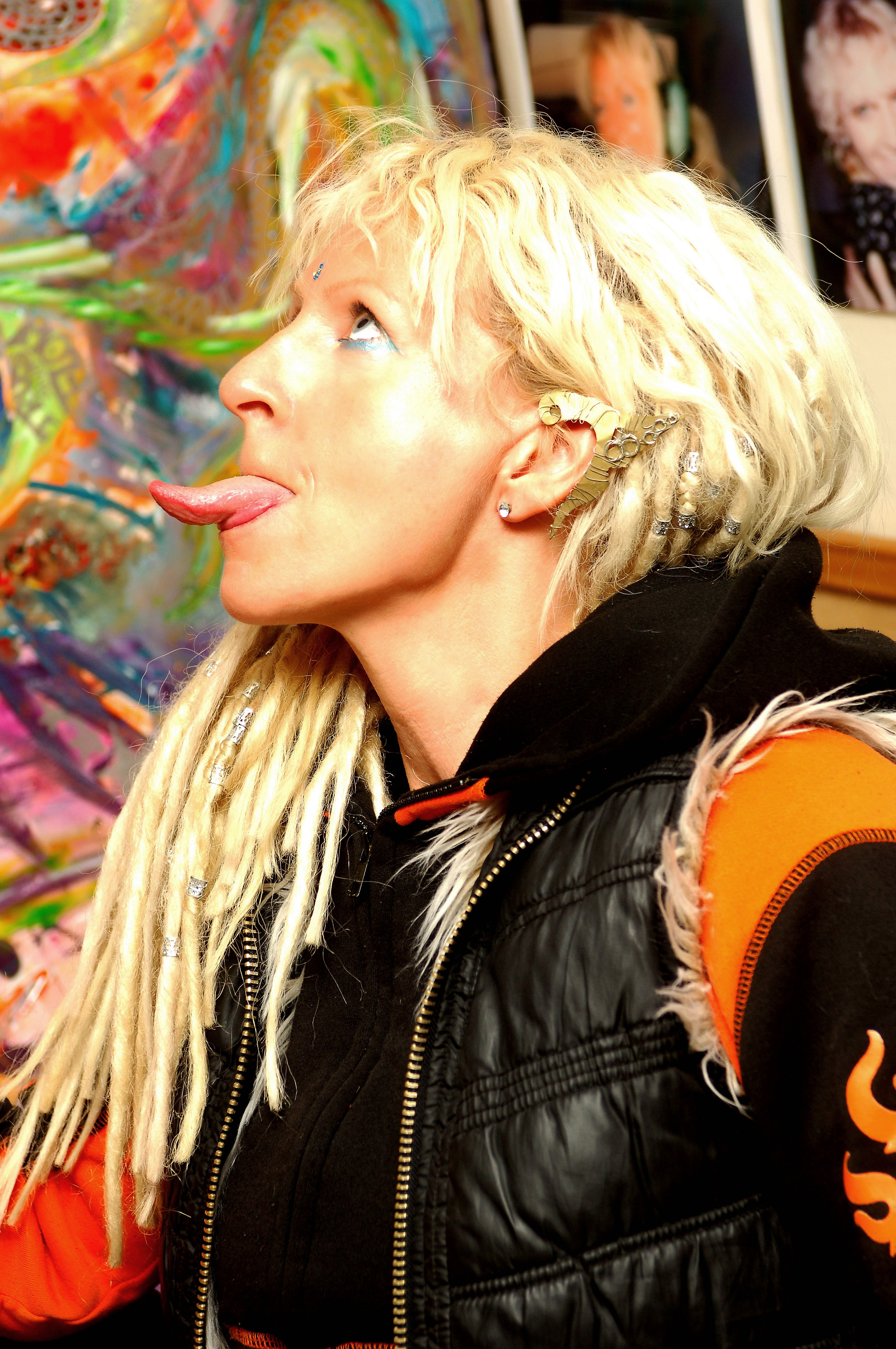
- Ziri Rideaux, photo taken in Venice Beach, CA
- Born: Ziri Barbara Wagner; January 4, 1967 (age 59); Esslingen, West Germany
- Occupations: Filmmaker/producer, journalist, artist
- Years active: 1985–present

Ziri Rideaux (born January 4, 1967, in West Germany) is a filmmaker, journalist and artist. She has directed films like Backgammon, The Treewoman and Burning Man.

== Early life ==
Born as Ziri Barbara Wagner in Esslingen/Germany, Rideaux grew up with her parents Wolf and Renate Wagner and her younger sister Maia. From an early age, Rideaux was encouraged to compete in various sports like horseback riding, gymnastic, athletics, fencing, volleyball and skiing among others. Most of her childhood years were spent in Bavaria (Wettstetten/Ingolstadt). She graduated with the German Abitur 1986 and finished her studies at LMU Munich with two Masters in International Politics and Journalism in 1991.

== Career ==
Rideaux started writing for newspapers at age 15 and started publishing the local political magazine Schanzer Journal at age 18. She then moved on to become editor-in-chief of the local TV Station Regionalfernsehen Ingolstadt at age 20 where she hosted the daily news hour. Rideaux moved to Munich, where she worked for German broadcaster Bayerischer Rundfunk (Radio and Television). In 1989 Rideaux moved to Berlin where she worked as a TV news reporter and show host for German Television ARD (broadcaster). She covered highlights of the German Reunification like the opening of the Brandenburg Gate. 1991 she co-hosted the TV show "Voll Drauf" (initially with Cherno Jobatey). In 1992, she left Germany to embark on a multiple year journey around the world, working as a foreign TV correspondent in places like Spain, Bosnia, Colombia, India, Afghanistan, Iraq, Australia, South Africa, Rwanda, Somalia, etc....

During those years, Rideaux worked extensively as a war correspondent and investigative journalist for various international TV stations like the BBC, British Channel 4, Dutch and German TV, ABC New York, ABC Australia, Nippon TV NHK, Reuters News agency, etc. During this time, Rideaux got "increasingly frustrated with the amount of censorship and propaganda we are exposed to in our daily media intake". (Rideaux 1994)

In September 1996 Rideaux moved to Los Angeles. Her company Zirius Film Productions produces hard-hitting documentaries and feature films. Her documentary Treewoman about Julia Butterfly Hill won international acclaim and various awards (among others, the prestigious International Documentary Association/Pare Lorentz Award). Other documentaries like Tornadoes, Curlers Against Misery, Burning Man as well as her TV-series Cowgirls were broadcast on TV-stations all over the world. In 2001, Rideaux wrote, directed and produced Backgammon, a futuristic Arthouse feature that won critical acclaim at festivals in Berlin, London and Cannes, where it received the Cannes Film Festival Independent Award – handed to Rideaux by Albert II, Prince of Monaco.

In 2002, Rideaux started the photo Agency "PicturePerfect", a red carpet celebrity photo agency. PicturePerfect is today one of the top 20 celebrity photo agency worldwide and operates in over 40 countries.

In 2012, Rideaux started the first alternative funeral home in the U.S. called FRIENDS. FRIENDS offers personalized ceremonies and funerals of all kinds, End-of-Life Celebrations, Death Midwifing – and is a strong promoter of Advanced Care Directives for everyone over 18 years of age.

Rideaux is currently getting ready to shoot the feature film Project Hammer in Johannesburg, South Africa, a political suspense thriller based on her true story as a war-correspondent.

== Interests ==
Rideaux is a self-taught writer, painter and draws comics since her early years. She is an expert horse trainer, a jewelry designer and has worked as a tattoo artist. She plays flamenco guitar and percussion instruments and is fluent in 4 languages.

== Personal life ==
The oldest of two daughters to Transylvanian immigrants, Rideaux spent a conflicted childhood in Germany. She left home at age 17 and left Germany as soon as she finished her University degrees. Rideaux stayed close to her family and regularly visits Germany. In 1996 she married Patrick Rideaux. The couple lived together in Venice, California until their divorce in 2007. Rideaux married Brendan Miller in 2016 and resides in Venice Beach and Topanga Canyon/Los Angeles. Since 2021, she is a member of the KPFK Pacifica Radio Local Station Board (90.7 FM).

== Awards ==
-NEW YORK INTERNATIONAL FILM FESTIVAL 2001, BEST FEATURE FILM BACKGAMMON
-LAKE ARROWHEAD INTERNATIONAL FILM FESTIVAL 2001, BEST DOCUMENTARY THE TREEWOMAN
-PARE LORENTZ AWARD 2000, INTERNATIONAL DOCUMENTARY ASSOCIATION THE TREEWOMAN
-BANFF TV FESTIVAL SPECIAL AUDIENCE AWARD 2000
-CANNES INDEPENDENT AWARD 2000
-DEUTSCHE WELLE DOCUMENTARY AWARD 1995
-NOMINATED FOR ARD (GERMAN BROADCASTER) FILMMAKER AWARD 1995
-NOMINATED FOR UNESCO FILM PRICE 1993
-BEST PUBLISHER/EDITOR OF REGIONAL MONTHLY MAGAZIN IN BAVARIA, 1986

== Filmography ==
Project Hammer (2009)
Project Hammer (2009) pre-production
Cowgirls (2005) TV series
Curlers Against Misery (2004) (TV)
Afghanistan: A Journey of Discovery (2002) (writer)
On the Warpath (2002)
Backgammon (2001)
Die Baumfrau (1999) (TV) ... aka The Tree Woman (International: English title)
Burning Man (1998) (TV)
In the Eye of the Tornado (1997) (TV)
