= Max Havoc: Ring of Fire =

2006 Canadian action film

- Directed by: Terry Ingram
- Written by: Donald Martin; Michael Stokes
- Produced by: Christian Arnold-Beutel; John F.S. Laing
- Starring: Mickey Hardt
- Cinematography: Anthony Metchie
- Edited by: David Czerwinski
- Music by: John Sereda; Paul Michael Thomas
- Distributed by: Westlake Entertainment
- Release date: 28 July 2006 (Canada)
- Running time: 89 minutes
- Country: Canada
- Language: English

Max Havoc: Ring of Fire is a 2006 action film directed by Terry Ingram. Mickey Hardt reprises his role from the 2004 film Max Havoc: Curse of the Dragon as ex-kickboxing champion and photographer Max Havoc.

== Plot ==
Retired kickboxing champion Max Havoc still works as a sports photographer for a magazine. Max shall take photographs of Suzy Blaine, a tennis celebrity. But when he arrives at a hotel in the outskirts of Seattle, a little boy named Emile steals the suitcase which contains his costly camera and further equipment. During his escape the young thief loses a piece of his clothing with a label that points to a very old mission in a no-go area.

Sister Caroline informs Max about a street gang that systematically frightens off old-established shopkeepers. As Max learns Emile once started stealing because his parents (also shopkeepers) had been killed as a result of arson. While Max is still present, the street gang appears and threatens Sister Caroline because she is reluctant to pay protection money. Max fights against the gangsters but spares a member named Ramon for he is Emile's big brother.

The next day Emile witnesses how his brother Ramon is executed for alleged cowardice. Roger Tarso, the owner of the hotel where Max and Suzy and her mother currently stay, has decided to clear the slums by all means because he wants to add the land to his premises. In order to keep all this a secret he has Emile chased by his henchmen. But Max and Suzy discover his scheme anyway and try to find Emile first. In the end Max has to fight against an enemy who seems to know his fighting style better than Max himself.

== Cast ==
- Mickey Hardt as Max Havoc
- Christina Cox as Suzy Blaine
- Linda Thorson as Denise Blaine
- Dean Cain as Roger Tarso
- Rae Dawn Chong as Sister Caroline
- Samuel Patrick Chu as Emile
- Martin Kove as Lt. Reynolds

== Reception ==
Reviewer for Direct to Video Connoisseur was not impressed by this film's dialogues or its storyline but it was recommended for movie fans who enjoy martial arts. Albert Valentin of Kung Fu Cinema praised fight choreography by Steve McMichael and Mickey Hardt's kickboxing and Muay Thai prowess but complained about too little lighting during action scenes.

== Legacy ==
Rifftrax released a Video on Demand riff of the film on March 11, 2022 as a follow-up to their riff of the previous Max Havoc film.
