= Internationale Filmschule Köln =

Film school in Cologne, Germany

Coordinates: 50°56′32″N 06°56′16″E

international film school cologne
- ifs internationale filmschule köln
- Type: Public/Private
- Established: 2000
- Affiliations: CILECT
- Location: Cologne, Germany
- Nickname: ifs
- Website: filmschule.de

The ifs internationale filmschule köln gmbh (international film school cologne) is a privately funded film school in Cologne, Northrhine-Westphalia, Germany. The film school was founded by Filmstiftung NRW.

In the German film school ranking of Focus (issue 22/2006), the international filmschool cologne—together with the Academy of Media Arts Cologne and the dffb—were ranked as second after the Film Academy Baden-Württemberg. Evaluation criteria were the reputation of the university, the support for the students, the technical equipment and the number of awards won.

== History ==
The Internationale Filmschule Köln (ifs) was established in 2000 as a non-profit limited liability company (gGmbH) in Cologne, Germany. The initiative was led by the state government of North Rhine-Westphalia and the Film- und Medienstiftung NRW. The school emerged from the models of Schreibschule Köln e.V. and Filmschule NRW e.V.

Since 2004, the ifs has cooperated with the Technical University of Cologne (TH Köln) through a franchise agreement, allowing the university to confer state-recognized bachelor's and master's degrees.

In May 2020, Nadja Radojevic succeeded Simone Stewens as managing director of the ifs.

The ifs is a member of the international association of film and television schools, CILECT.

== Mission ==
The Internationale Filmschule Köln (ifs) is an educational institution dedicated to the academic and professional development of individuals in the fields of film and media. It offers accredited bachelor's and master's degree programs, as well as professional training courses, in collaboration with the Technical University of Cologne (TH Köln). The institution emphasizes interdisciplinary collaboration and engagement with both national and international industry standards.

== Study ==
The Internationale Filmschule Köln (ifs) offers academic programs in film and media disciplines, including bachelor's and master's degrees, in collaboration with the Technical University of Cologne (TH Köln).

=== Bachelor's Program ===
The Bachelor of Arts in Film is a six-semester program encompassing seven areas of specialization:

- Screenwriting
- Directing
- Creative Producing
- Director of Photography
- Editing Picture & Sound
- Production Design
- VFX & Animation

Each specialization admits a limited number of students, selected through a two-stage application process.

=== Master's Programs ===
The ifs offers several master's degree programs:

- M.A. Serial Storytelling: A two-year program focusing on collaborative writing for series, conducted in English.
- M.A. Digital Narratives: A program exploring digital storytelling across various media platforms. filmschule.de
- M.A. 3D Animation for Film & Games: A four-semester program offered in cooperation with the Cologne Game Lab, focusing on 3D animation for film, games, and immersive technologies.
- M.A. Entertainment Producing: A part-time program dedicated to the development and production of non-fictional entertainment formats.
- M.A. Film: A program covering various aspects of film production and theory.

=== Continuing Education ===
The ifs provides professional training programs for media professionals, including:

- European Showrunner Programme
- Masterclass Non-Fiction
- Masterclass Comedy
- Masterclass Entertainment
- Summer School Screenwriting

These programs vary in duration and are designed to enhance specific skills within the media industry.

=== Admission and Language Requirements ===
Admission to the bachelor's program requires a secondary school diploma and the completion of an aptitude assessment. Master's programs have specific prerequisites, including relevant academic qualifications and professional experience. While the primary language of instruction is German, certain master's programs, such as Serial Storytelling and 3D Animation for Film & Games, are conducted in English.

== Faculty ==
Professors and guest teachers at the ifs include:

- Hans-Christian Schmid
- Keith Johnstone
- David Bordwell
- Klaus Maria Brandauer
- Frank Griebe
- Seymour Cassel
- Donn Cambern

== Facilities ==
The Internationale Filmschule Köln (ifs) is located at Schanzenstraße 28 in Cologne, Germany. The campus includes various facilities to support education and training in film and media. These facilities comprise a Dolby Atmos-equipped auditorium with 160 seats, a 300-square-meter studio featuring a truss system and green screen, and a production design workshop connected to the studio. Additional resources include editing suites, a recording room, and capabilities for Dolby Atmos cinema mixing, pre-mixing, and color grading. The school also provides VFX workspaces equipped with 3D printers and render farms, as well as multimedia technology resources such as motion capture suits, 360-degree cameras, and VR equipment. Fully equipped seminar rooms, including computer labs with iMac workstations, are available for instructional purposes.

== Research ==
The Internationale Filmschule Köln engages in research activities that combine artistic practice with theoretical and analytical approaches. The institution applies practice-based research methods, particularly in areas related to film, digital media, and storytelling.

Research is integrated into several of the school’s academic programs, especially at the master's level. Projects typically explore topics such as narrative structures, media aesthetics, digital transformation in storytelling, and new technologies in audiovisual production. Outcomes may include academic texts, media prototypes, or documentation of creative processes.

The ifs participates in academic networks and conferences, and contributes to publications in the fields of film and media studies. It is involved in national and international collaborations in research and education, including through its affiliation with the International Association of Film and Television Schools (CILECT).
