= Yvonne Brosch =

German actress and director

Yvonne Brosch is a German actress and director.

== Filmography ==
- 1975: Der Brandner Kaspar und das ewig' Leben
- 1976: Der verkaufte Großvater
- 1977: Derrick
- 1980: SOKO 5113
- 1982: Büro, Büro
- 1993: Rußige Zeiten
- 1993: Forsthaus Falkenau
- 2008: Ekkelins Knecht
