= List of international presidential trips made by Frank-Walter Steinmeier =

This is a list of presidential visits to foreign countries made by Frank-Walter Steinmeier, the current President of Germany. Steinmeier was elected on 12 February 2017 and assumed the office for a five-year term on 19 March 2017, succeeding Joachim Gauck.

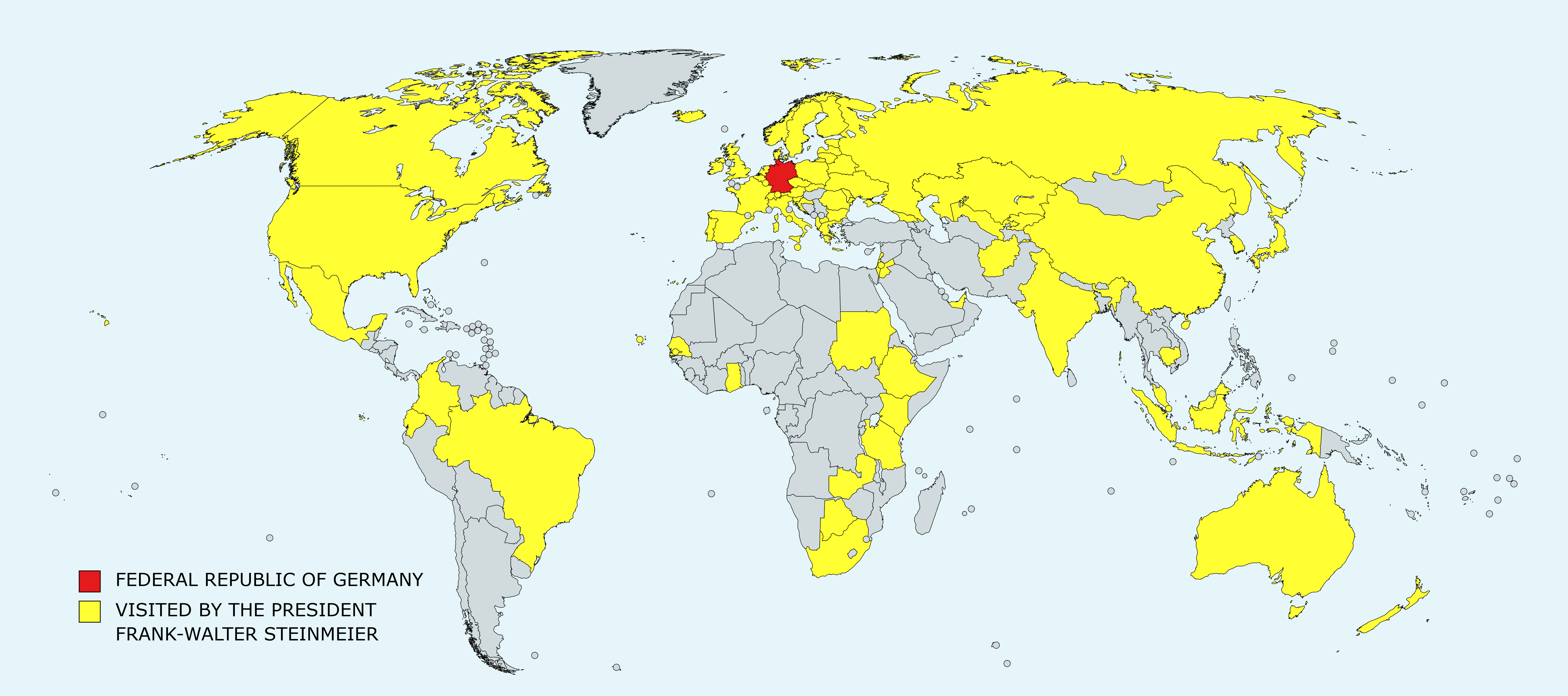
As of November 2023.

== 2017 ==
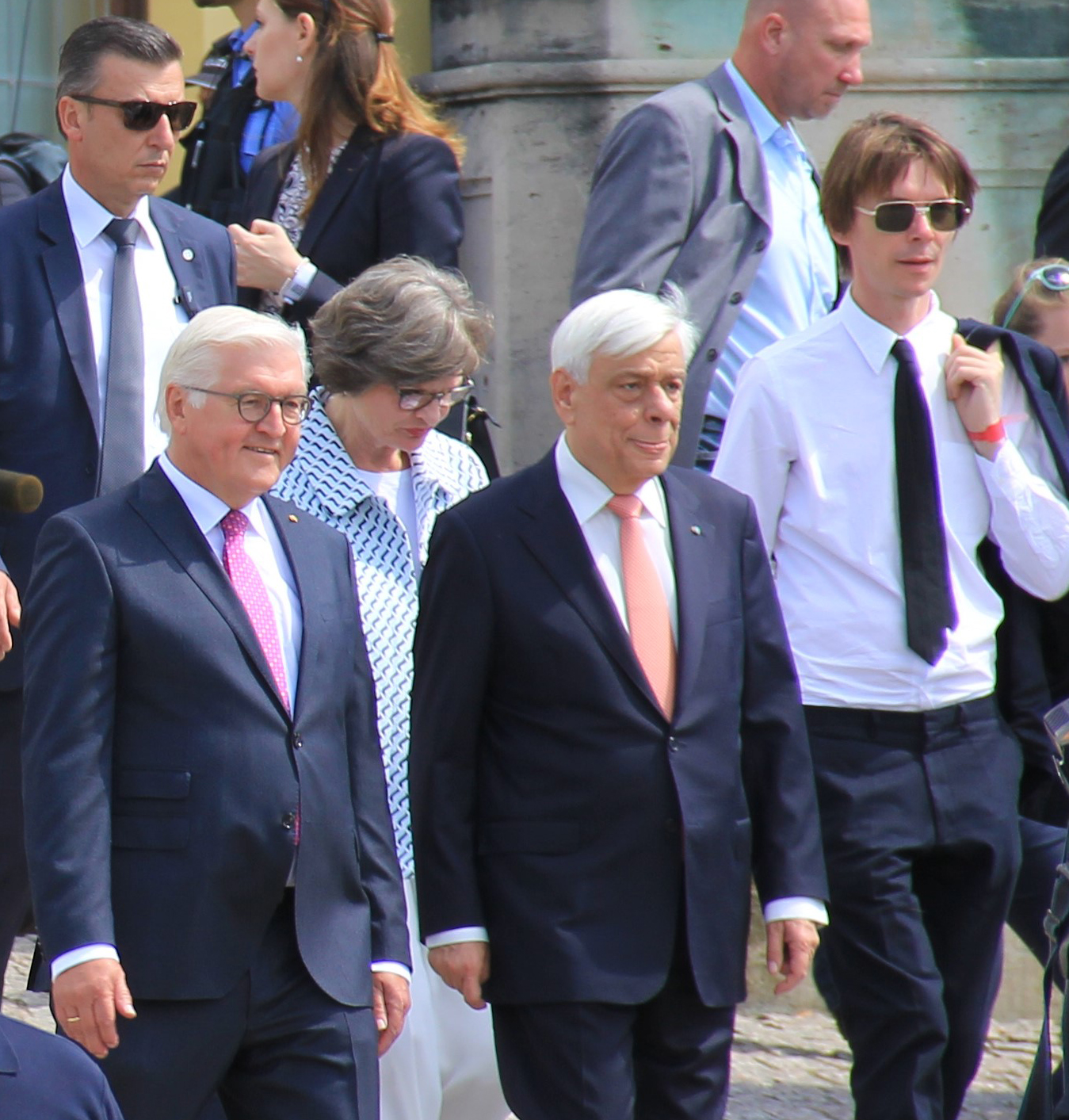
Steinmeier with Greek President Prokopis Pavlopoulos

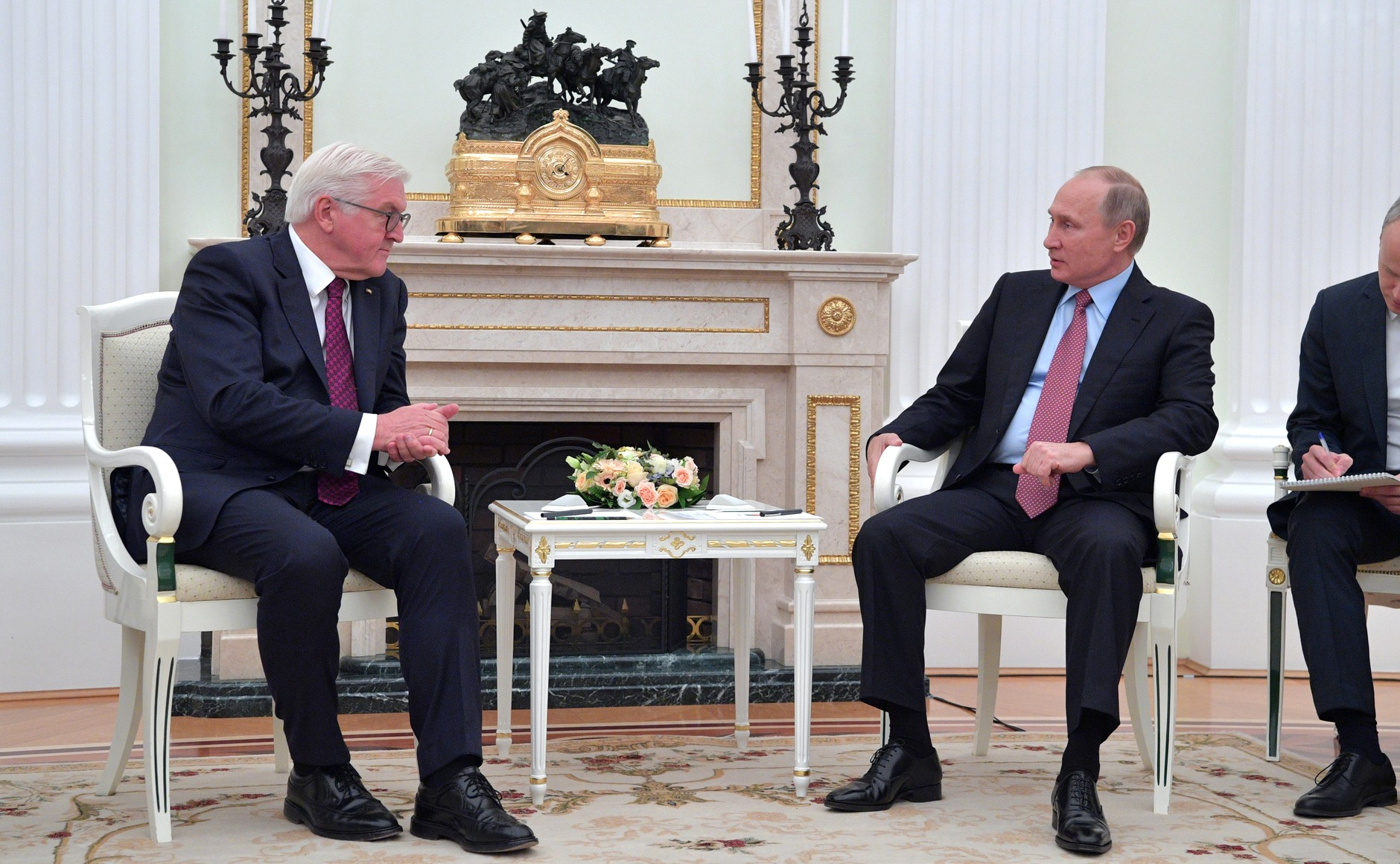
Steinmeier with Russian President Vladimir Putin

Date	Countries	Places visited	Narrative
30 March	France	Paris	Inaugural visit to President François Hollande.
4 April	France	Strasbourg	Steinmeier addressed the European Parliament. He met with the President of the European Parliament, Antonio Tajani and the President of the European Commission, Jean-Claude Juncker.
7–8 April	Greece	Athens	Inaugural visit to President Prokopis Pavlopoulos; Steinmeier also met with Prime Minister Alexis Tsipras and attended the opening ceremony of documenta 14.
3–4 May	Italy	Rome	Inaugural visit to President Sergio Mattarella; Steinmeier also met with Prime Minister Paolo Gentiloni and former President Giorgio Napolitano.
6–9 May	Israel	Tel Aviv; Jerusalem; Herzliya	Inaugural visit to Israel and the Palestinian territories. Steinmeier met with Israeli President Reuven Rivlin, Israeli Prime Minister Benjamin Netanyahu and opposition leader Isaac Herzog. During his stay he visited the gravesites of Yitzhak Rabin and Shimon Peres, the Yad Vashem memorial, the meeting center Beit Ben-Yehuda, the Hebrew University of Jerusalem and the educational institute Givat Haviva. He also met with survivors of the Holocaust. In Ramallah, he met with the President of the Palestinian National Authority Mahmoud Abbas and visited the gravesite of Yasser Arafat.
6–9 May	Palestine	Ramallah; Qubeibeh	
19 May	Poland	Warsaw	Inaugural visit to Poland; Steinmeier met with President Andrzej Duda and Prime Minister Beata Szydło.
3 June	Slovenia	Brdo Castle near Kranj	Steinmeier attended a meeting of leaders from Southeast Europe. He also held bilateral meetings with Slovenian President Borut Pahor, Croatian President Kolinda Grabar-Kitarović, Serbian President Aleksandar Vučić and Kosovar President Hashim Thaçi.
15–16 June	Belgium	Brussels	Steinmeier met with the Secretary General of NATO Jens Stoltenberg, the President of the European Council Donald Tusk and with King Philippe and Queen Mathilde of Belgium.
1 July	France	Strasbourg	Steinmeier attended the European ceremony of honour for former German Chancellor Helmut Kohl.
11–12 July	Kazakhstan	Astana	Steinmeier met with President Nursultan Nazarbayev and visited the Expo 2017.
13 July	Afghanistan	Mazar-i-Sharif; Kabul	Steinmeier visited German troops and met with Afghan President Ashraf Ghani and Chief Executive of Afghanistan Abdullah Abdullah.
14–15 July	Austria	Vienna	Inaugural visit to Austria; Steinmeier met with President Alexander Van der Bellen, Chancellor Christian Kern and former President Heinz Fischer.
22–23 August	Estonia	Tallinn	Steinmeier met with President Kersti Kaljulaid and Prime Minister Jüri Ratas.
23–24 August	Latvia	Riga	Steinmeier met with President Raimonds Vējonis and Prime Minister Māris Kučinskis.
24–25 August	Lithuania	Vilnius; Rukla	Steinmeier met with President Dalia Grybauskaitė and Prime Minister Saulius Skvernelis and visited the NATO Enhanced Forward Presence command post in Rukla.
12 September	Czech Republic	Prague	Steinmeier met with President Miloš Zeman.
14–15 September	Malta	Valletta; Siġġiewi	Steinmeier attended the Arraiolos meeting.
27 September	Luxembourg	Luxembourg	Steinmeier attended the meeting of the German speaking heads of state. He met with Grand Duke Henri of Luxembourg, Hereditary Prince Alois of Liechtenstein, King Philippe of Belgium, Austrian President Alexander Van der Bellen and Swiss President Doris Leuthard.
8–9 October	Vatican		Steinmeier was granted an audience by Pope Francis. He also met with Cardinal Secretary of State Pietro Parolin and visited the seat of the Community of Sant'Egidio.
25–26 October	Russia	Moscow	Steinmeier met with President Vladimir Putin.
2–3 November	Singapore	Singapore	Steinmeier met with President Halimah Yacob and Prime Minister Lee Hsien Loong. He then delivered remarks at the Singapore Management University, met with representatives of the Asia–Europe Foundation, and visited the Singapore Botanic Gardens.
3–5 November	Australia	Perth; Sydney	Steinmeier met with Australian Prime Minister Malcolm Turnbull, the Governor of Western Australia, Kerry Sanderson, and the Premier of Western Australia, Mark McGowan, in Perth. He then traveled to Sydney and met with the Governor-General of Australia, Peter Cosgrove, and the Governor of New South Wales, David Hurley. He also visited the Sydney Opera House.
5–7 November	New Zealand	Wellington; Auckland	Steinmeier met with the Governor-General of New Zealand, Patsy Reddy, Prime Minister Jacinda Ardern, and the Leader of the Opposition, Bill English. He also visited the Museum of New Zealand Te Papa Tongarewa.
10 November	France	Paris; Soultz-Haut-Rhin; Wattwiller	Steinmeier met President Emmanuel Macron and visited the memorial at Hartmannswillerkopf
17 November	Slovakia	Bratislava; Žilina	Steinmeier met with President Andrej Kiska, Prime Minister Robert Fico and the Speaker of the National Council, Andrej Danko
28 November	United Kingdom	London	Steinmeier met with Queen Elizabeth II and visited Westminster Abbey
11–13 December	Ghana	Accra	Steinmeier met with President Nana Akufo-Addo
13–14 December	Gambia	Banjul	Steinmeier met with President Adama Barrow

== 2018 ==
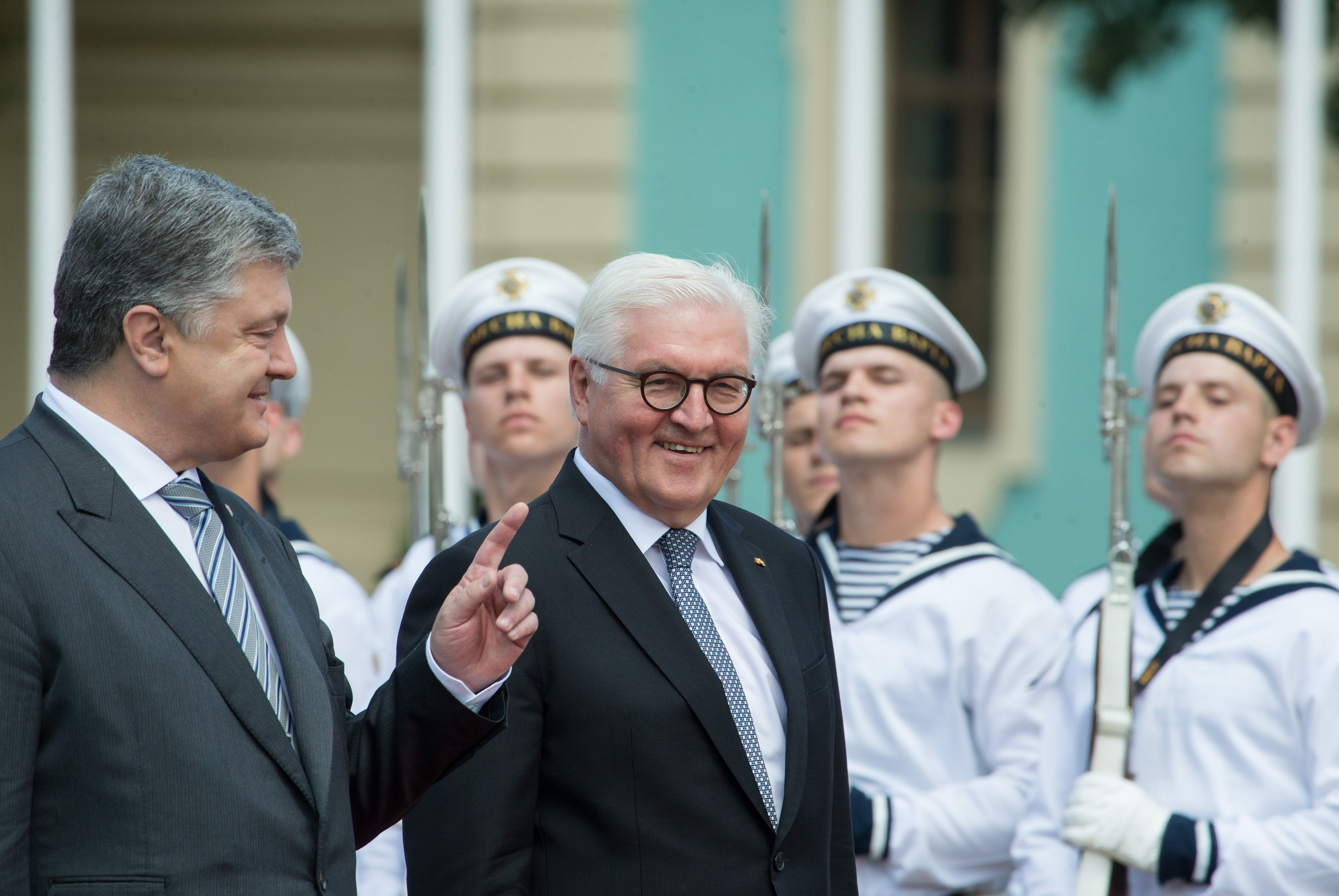
Steinmeier with Petro Poroshenko in Ukraine in May 2018

Date	Countries	Places visited	Narrative
27–29 January	Jordan	Amman; Jerash; Azraq	Steinmeier met with King Abdullah II, visited the Azraq refugee camp, and met with soldiers at Muwaffaq Salti Air Base.
29–31 January	Lebanon	Beirut	Steinmeier met with President Michael Aoun and Prime Minister Saad Hariri. He also met with the Speaker of the Parliament Nabih Berri. The President addressed students at Lebanese University and visited the National Museum of Beirut.
6–7 February	Japan	Tokyo	Steinmeier met with Emperor Akihito and Prime Minister Shinzo Abe
7–11 February	South Korea	Seoul; Alpensia Resort; Gangneung	Steinmeier met with President Moon Jae-in, attended the 2018 Winter Olympics opening ceremony, and visited competitions at the Olympics. He also met with the President of the International Olympic Committee, Thomas Bach, and the President of the International Paralympic Committee, Andrew Parsons.
16 February	Lithuania	Vilnius	Steinmeier attended the celebrations of the 100th anniversary of the restoration of Lithuanian statehood.
1–2 March	Portugal	Lisbon; Porto	Steinmeier met with President Marcelo Rebelo de Sousa and Prime Minister António Costa
21–26 March	India	Varanasi; New Delhi; Chennai; Mamallapuram	Steinmeier visited the Sarnath Museum and Dashashwamedh Ghat, where he participated in an Aarti ceremony. He delivered a speech at University of Delhi and met with President Ram Nath Kovind, Prime Minister Narendra Modi, and foreign minister Sushma Swaraj. In Chennai, he visited a Daimler AG production facility and the Indian Institute of Technology Madras. He concluded his trip by visiting the UNESCO World Heritage Site at Mahabalipuram.
25–26 April	Switzerland	Kehrsatz; Bern; Fribourg; Kilchberg	Steinmeier met with President Alain Berset and all members of the Federal Council. He delivered a speech at University of Fribourg and visited the Cathedral of St. Nicholas. He concluded his trip with a flight over the Aletsch Glacier and a visit to the family grave of Thomas Mann.
15–16 May	Netherlands	Amsterdam; Delft	Steinmeier met with King Willem-Alexander and Prime Minister Mark Rutte. He visited the Delft University of Technology and the Rijksmuseum.
29–30 May	Ukraine	Kyiv; Lviv	Steinmeier met with President Petro Poroshenko, Prime Minister Volodymyr Groysman, and writer Serhiy Zhadan. He delivered a speech at the National University of Kyiv-Mohyla Academy and visited the University of Lviv.
5–6 June	Poland	Warsaw	Steinmeier met with President Andrzej Duda.
17–21 June	United States	Los Angeles; San Francisco; Stanford	Steinmeier met with mayor Eric Garcetti, Condoleezza Rice and Governor Jerry Brown.
29 June	Belarus	Minsk	Steinmeier attended the opening of the Maly Trostenets memorial, and met with President Alexander Lukashenko.
5–6 September	Switzerland	Sils Maria; Riom-Parsonz	Steinmeier attended the meeting of the German-speaking heads of state and met with King Philippe of Belgium, Alois, Hereditary Prince of Liechtenstein, Henri, Grand Duke of Luxembourg, Austrian President Alexander Van der Bellen und Swiss President Alain Berset.
13–14 September	Latvia	Riga; Rundāle Palace	President Steinmeier attended the Arraiolos meeting.
17–19 September	Finland	Oulu; Helsinki	President Steinmeier met with President Sauli Niinistö and Prime Minister Juha Sipilä. He also visited the sea fortress Suomenlinna.
9 October	Austria	Vienna	President Steinmeier met with Austrian President Alexander Van der Bellen and Slovak President Andrej Kiska.
10–12 October	Greece	Athens; Haidari; Kalamata	President Steinmeier met with President Prokopis Pavlopoulos, Prime Minister Alexis Tsipras, and the Leader of the Opposition, Kyriakos Mitsotakis. He received an honorary doctorate by the National and Kapodistrian University of Athens, visited the Haidari concentration camp and the ancient city of Messene.
24–25 October	Spain	Madrid; Badajoz; Mérida	President Steinmeier met with King Felipe VI and Prime Minister Pedro Sánchez. He then flew to Badajoz and met with the President of the Regional Government of Extremadura, Guillermo Fernández Vara. Steinmeier also visited the Amphitheatre of Mérida.
4 November	France	Strasbourg	President Steinmeier attended a concert in remembrance of the end of World War I 100 years ago. He also met with French President Emmanuel Macron.
11 November	United Kingdom	London	Attended WW1 centenary remembrance services in Whitehall and Westminster Abbey.
18–21 November	South Africa	Cape Town; Johannesburg	President Steinmeier met with South African President Cyril Ramaphosa and the Leader of the Opposition, Mmusi Maimane. He visited the Ponte Tower and the Apartheid Museum in Johannesburg, and the Zeitz Museum of Contemporary Art Africa in Cape Town.
21–22 November	Botswana	Gaborone	President Steinmeier met with President Mokgweetsi Masisi and the Executive Secretary of the Southern African Development Community, Stergomena Tax.
4–10 December	China	Beijing; Guangdong; Sichuan	President Steinmeier met with President Xi Jinping, Prime Minister Li Keqiang. He visited Sichuan University and gave a speech. He also visited the Cantonese Opera Museum.

== 2019 ==
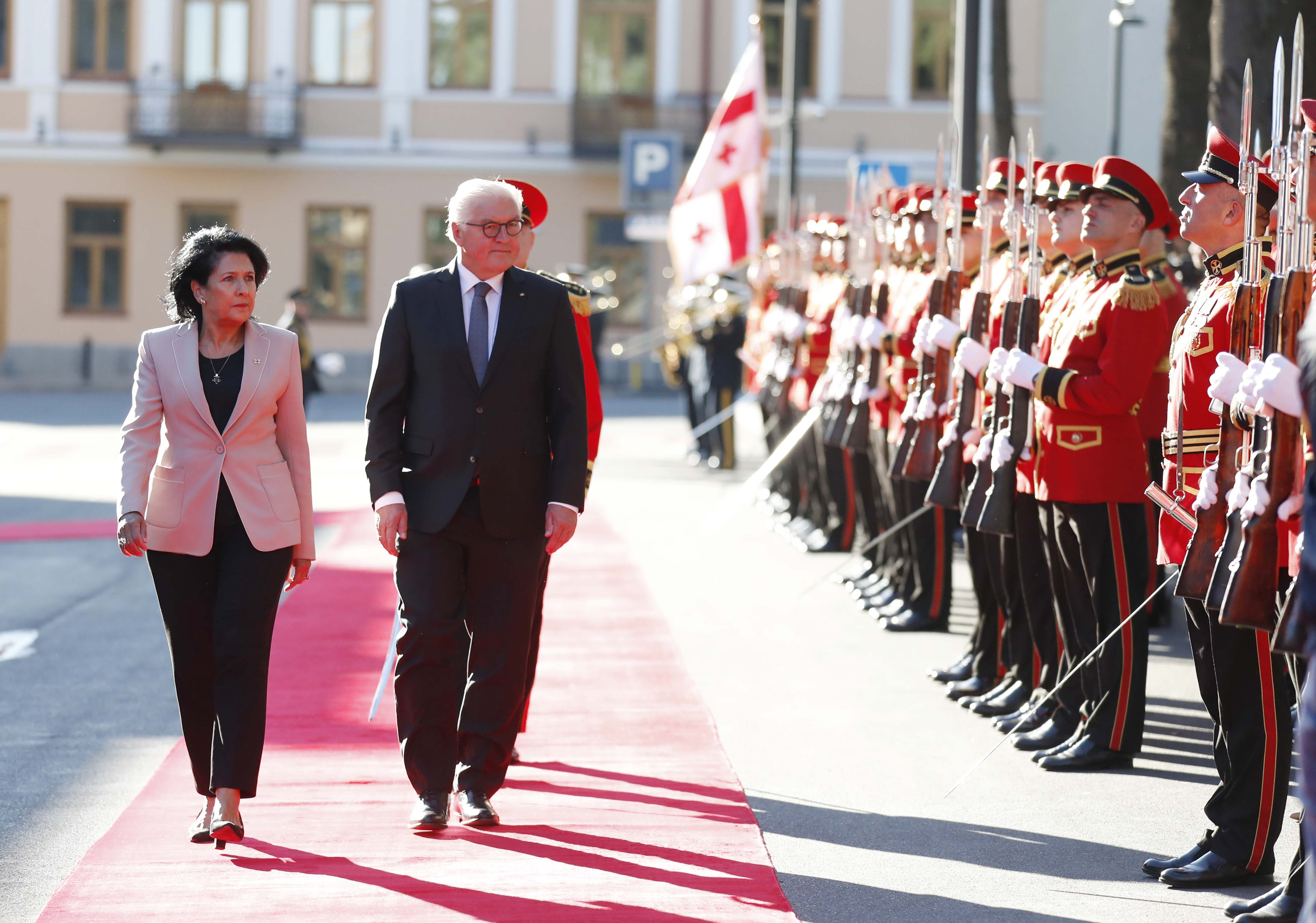
Steinmeier with Georgian President Salome Zourabichvili

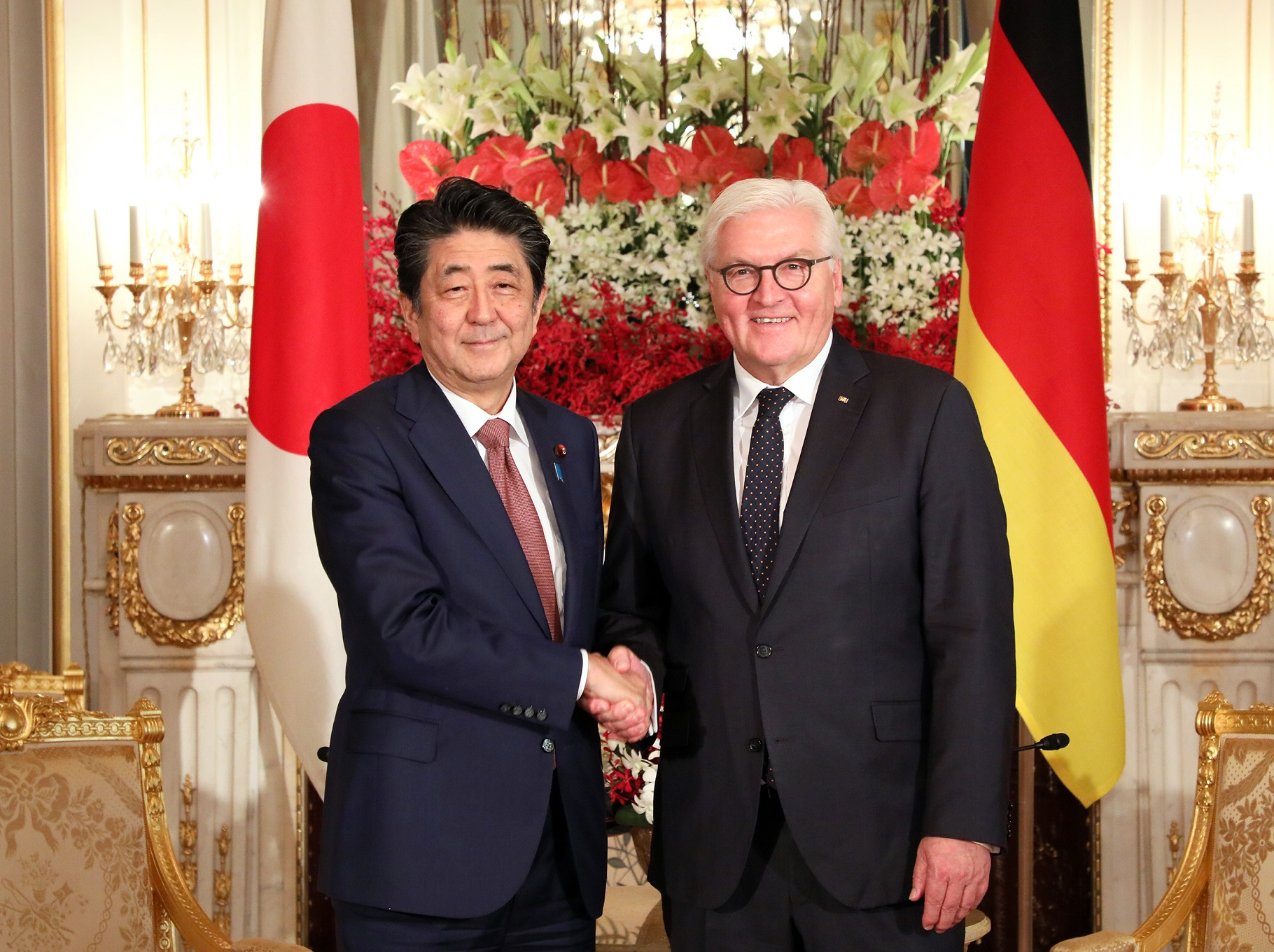
Steinmeier with Japanese Prime Minister Shinzo Abe

Date	Countries	Places visited	Narrative
23 January	Liechtenstein	Schaan	President Steinmeier attended the ceremony of 300 years of the Principality of Liechtenstein.
27–30 January	Ethiopia	Addis Ababa; Lalibela	President Steinmeier met with President Sahle-Work Zewde, Prime Minister Abiy Ahmed. He visited the African Union Headquarters and met with the head of African Union Moussa Faki.
11–13 February	Colombia	Cartagena; Isla Grande; Bogotá	President Steinmeier met with President Iván Duque Márquez. He also met with Kogi indigenous community.
13–16 February	Ecuador	Quito; Baltra; Santa Cruz Island; Guayaquil	President Steinmeier met with President Lenín Moreno.
20–22 March	Croatia	Zagreb; Split	President Steinmeier met with President Kolinda Grabar-Kitarović and Speaker Gordan Jandroković. He then flew to Split where he had breakfast with the Mayor of the City of Split Andro Krstulović Opara.
4–5 April	Bulgaria	Sofia; Plovdiv	President Steinmeier met with President Rumen Radev, Prime Minister Boyko Borisov, President of the National Assembly of Bulgaria Tsetska Karayantcheva and met with Mayor of Plovdiv Ivan Totev.
9–10 May	Slovenia	Ljubljana; Kobarid	President Steinmeier met with President Borut Pahor, Speaker of the National Assembly Dejan Židan and Prime Minister Marjan Šarec. He also attend a concert in celebration of Europe Day.
27–29 May	Uzbekistan	Tashkent; Urgench; Xiva	President Steinmeier met with President Shavkat Mirziyoyev. He met students of Urgench State University.
3–4 June	Austria	Linz	President Steinmeier attended the meeting of the German-speaking head of states.
5 June	Slovenia	Ljubljana	President Steinmeier attended the summit of the Three Seas Initiative.
12–14 June	Iceland	Reykjavík; Vestmannaeyjar	President Steinmeier met with President Guðni Th. Jóhannesson and Prime Minister Katrín Jakobsdóttir. He also visited the Sólheimajökull glacier and Eldfell volcano.
15–16 June	Finland	Kultaranta	President Steinmeier met with President Sauli Niinistö. He also inaugurated the "Kultaranta talks".
25 August	Italy	Fivizzano	President Steinmeier met with President Sergio Mattarella. He also commemorated the victims of the Vinca massacre.
31 August–1 September	Poland	Łódź; Wieluń; Warsaw	President Steinmeier met with President Andrzej Duda. He also had a speech to commemorate the 80th anniversary of the start of the Second World War.
19–20 September	Italy	Rome; Naples	President Steinmeier met with President Sergio Mattarella, Prime Minister Giuseppe Conte, President of the Italian Senate Elisabetta Casellati and President of the Chamber of Deputies Roberto Fico. He also visited the Basilica of Santa Maria della Sanità.
30 September	France	Paris	President Steinmeier attended the funeral of President Jacques Chirac.
6–8 October	Georgia	Tbilisi; Telavi	President Steinmeier met with President Salome Zourabichvili, Prime Minister Giorgi Gakharia, President of the Georgian Parliament Archil Talakvadze and Ilia II, Patriarch of the Georgian Orthodox Church. He also visited the Alaverdi Monastery.
10–12 October	Greece	Athens	President Steinmeier attended the Arraiolos meeting.
20–23 October	Japan	Tokyo	President Steinmeier attended the ceremony of the enthronement of Emperor Naruhito and Empress Masako of Japan. He also met with Prime Minister Shinzō Abe and Foreign Minister Fumio Kishida.
30 October–1 November	United States	Boston	President Steinmeier visited the Gropius House. He also met with the governor of Massachusetts, Charlie Baker, and had a panel discussion at the Harvard Law School.
16 December	Belgium	Bastogne	President Steinmeier had a speech at the commemoration of the 75th anniversary of the start of the Ardennes offensive.

== 2020 ==
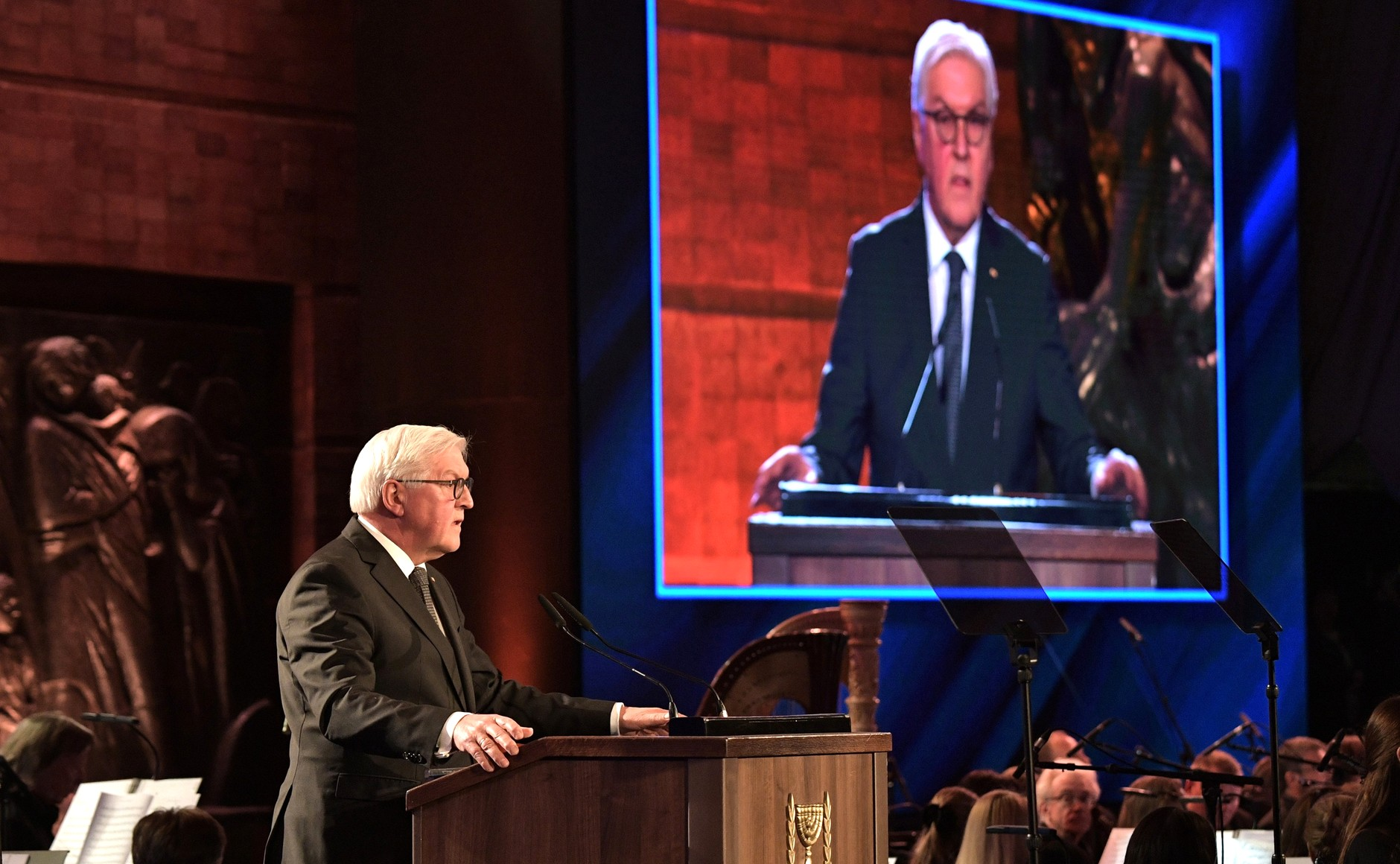
Steinmeier in Israel

Date	Countries	Places visited	Narrative
22–23 January	Israel	Tel Aviv; Jerusalem	President Steinmeier attended the 75th anniversary of the liberation of the Auschwitz concentration camp. He also had a speech at the 5th World Holocaust Forum.
27 January	Poland	Oświęcim	President Steinmeier visited the Auschwitz and Auschwitz II-Birkenau concentration camps.
23–26 February	Kenya	Nairobi; Kiambu; Kakuma	President Steinmeier met with President Uhuru Kenyatta. He also visited refugees in the Turkana County.
27–28 February	Sudan	Khartoum	President Steinmeier met with Abdel Fattah Abdelrahman Burhan, Chairman of the Sovereignty Council of Sudan, and Prime Minister Abdalla Hamdok. He also visited the Sudan National Museum.
22–23 August	Austria	Salzburg	President Steinmeier attended the Salzburg Festival. He also visited the Museum der Moderne Salzburg, and met with President Alexander Van der Bellen.
17–18 September	Italy	Milan	President Steinmeier met with President Sergio Mattarella and emergency workers affected during the acute phase of the COVID-19 pandemic. He also attended a performance of Ludwig van Beethoven's Symphony No. 9 in D minor, op. 125 and toured Milan Cathedral.

== 2021 ==
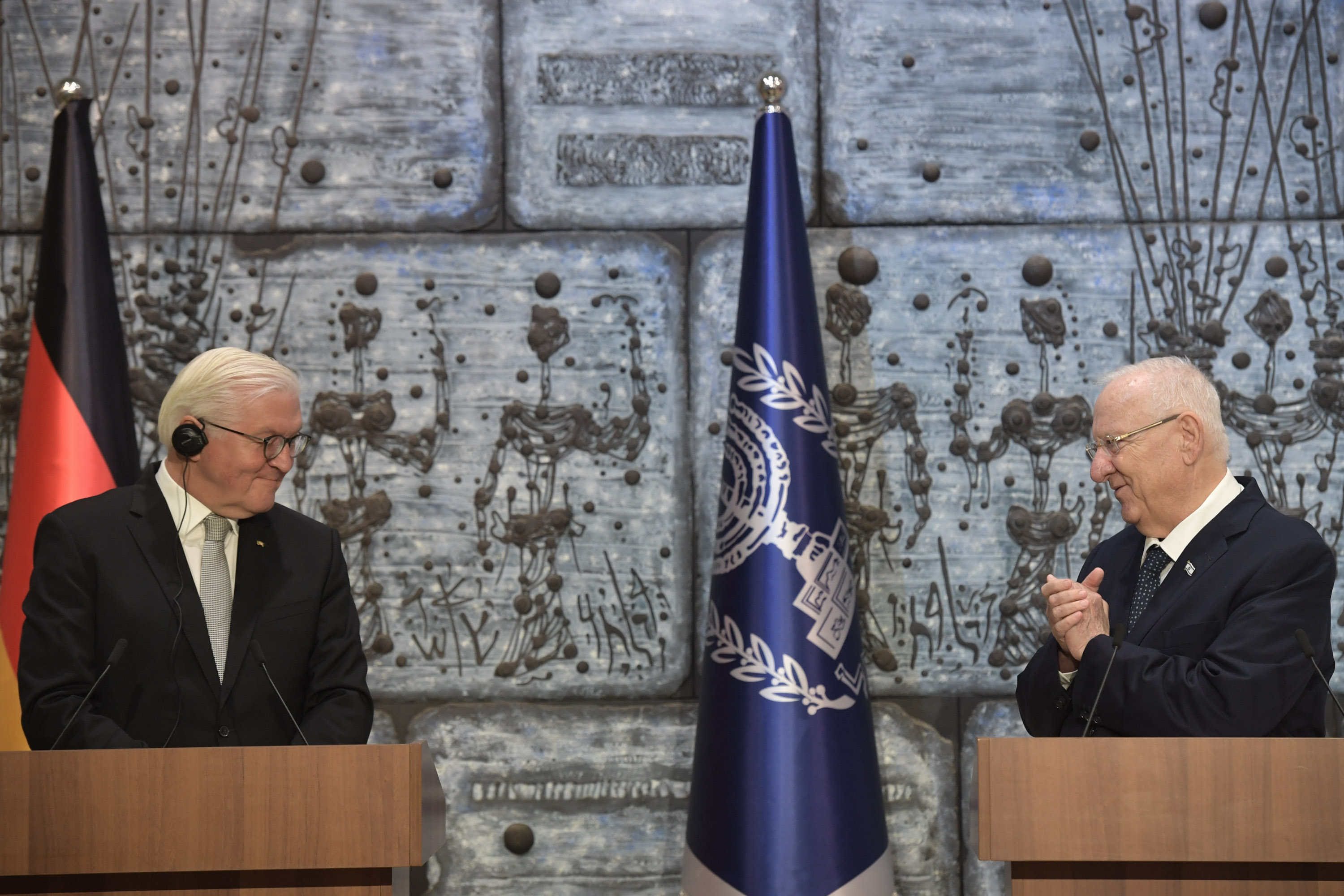
Steinmeier with Israeli President Reuven Rivlin

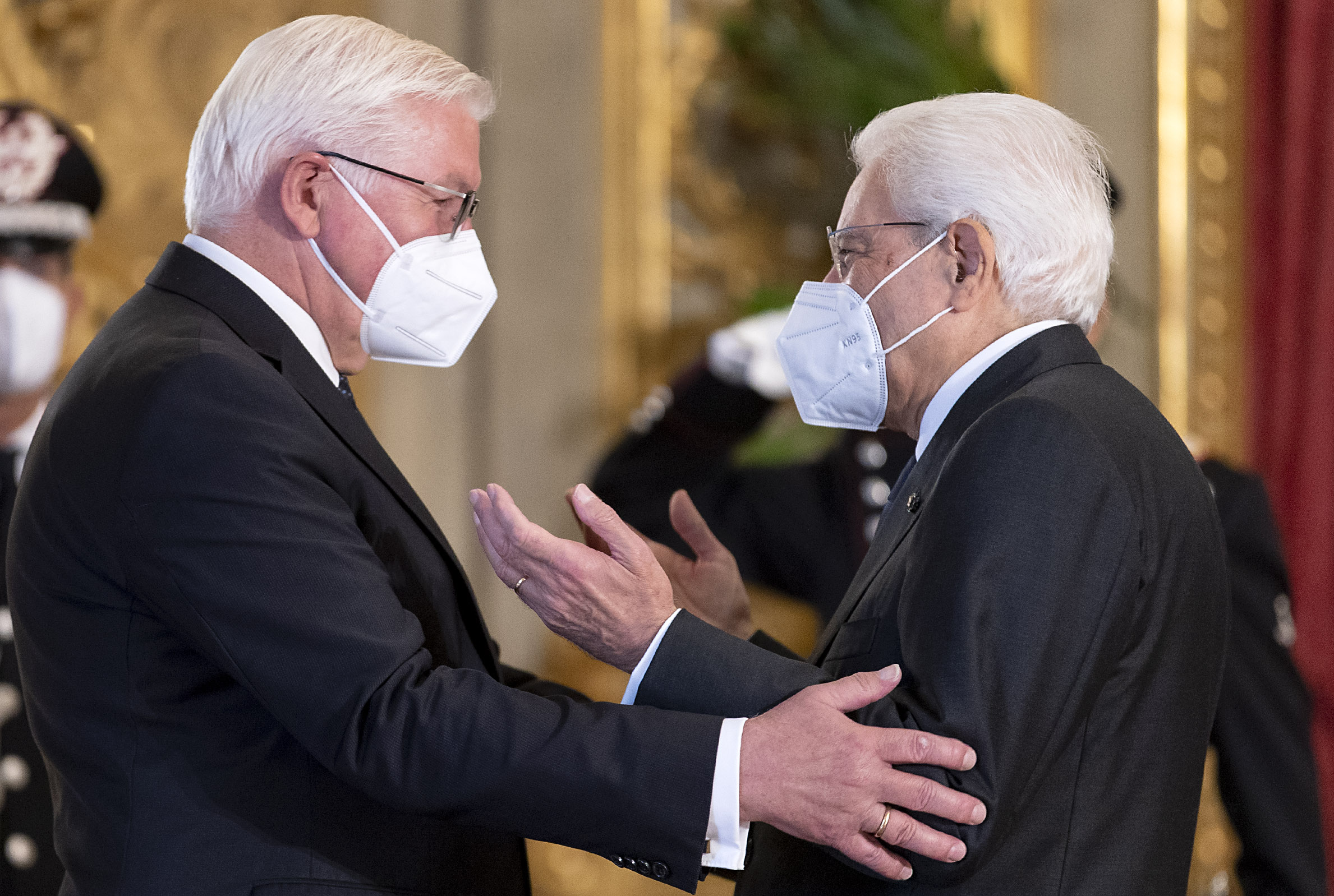
Steinmeier with Italian President Sergio Mattarella

Date	Countries	Places visited	Narrative
26 April	France	Paris	President Steinmeier met with President Emmanuel Macron for talks.
30 May	Slovenia	Ljubljana	President Steinmeier met with Portuguese President Marcelo Rebelo de Sousa and Slovenian President Borut Pahor for talks on the EU Trio Council Presidency of Germany, Portugal and Slovenia..
12–13 June	Denmark	Haderslev; Aabenraa; Sønderborg	President Steinmeier met with Queen Margrethe II of Denmark, Frederik, Crown Prince of Denmark and Prime Minister Mette Frederiksen. He also attended a service at Haderslev Cathedral for the 100th anniversary of the 1920 Schleswig plebiscites which led to South Jutland County joining Denmark and also to have a dinner on the HDMY Dannebrog (A540).
17 June	Poland	Warsaw	President Steinmeier met with Polish President Andrzej Duda and President of the International Auschwitz Committee Marian Turski. Also marked 30 years of the German-Polish Treaty on Good-Neighbourliness.
30 June–2 July	Israel	Tel Aviv; Jerusalem; Sde Boker	President Steinmeier met with Israeli President Reuven Rivlin, Prime Minister Naftali Bennett and Alternate Prime Minister and Foreign Minister Yair Lapid. He also visited the grave of Theodor Herzl in Jerusalem, the Holocaust memorial Yad Vashem and the grave of Ben Gurion and his wife Paula Ben-Gurion in Sde Boker. Also on the trip he met Holocaust survivor Regina Steinitz, writer David Grossman, artist Michal Rovner and former head of the Yad Vashem Holocaust Remembrance Center Avner Shalev.
7–9 September	Sweden	Stockholm; Kiruna	President Steinmeier paid a state visit to the Kingdom of Sweden. He met with King Carl XVI Gustaf and Queen Silvia of Sweden and attended a state dinner at Stockholm Palace. He held talks with Prime Minister Stefan Löfven. He also gave a speech to the Riksdag and attended a lunch hosted by Cecilia Brinck, President of Stockholm County Council and Anna König Jerlmy, the Mayor of Stockholm. President Steinmeier travelled onto Kiruna, where he met with Lotta Finstorp, Norrbotten County Governor.
15 September	Italy	Rome	President Steinmeier attended the 16th Arraiolos Group meeting.
29–30 September	Moldova	Chișinău; Străşeni	President Steinmeier paid a working visit to Moldova. In Chișinău he met with President Maia Sandu, Prime Minister Natalia Gavrilița and Speaker of Parliament Igor Grosu. He also opened a business conference and met German Academic Exchange Service alumni. In Străşeni, he visited the Engineering College in Străşeni.
6 October	Ukraine	Kyiv; Koriukivka	President Steinmeier attended the 80th Anniversary of the Koriukivka massacre. He attended a memorial to the victims in Koriukivka and met with President Volodymyr Zelenskyy and attended the Babyn Yar Holocaust Memorial Center.
27–29 October	Ireland	Dublin; Limerick	President Steinmeier paid a state visit to the Republic of Ireland. He met with President Michael D. Higgins and First Lady Sabina Higgins and attended a state banquet in his honour. He held talks with Taoiseach Micheál Martin, Speaker of the Lower House Seán Ó Fearghaíl and talks figures involved in the Northern Ireland peace process on the impact of Brexit. He visited Trinity College Dublin, Dogpatch Lab startup hub and the National Gallery of Ireland with the Mayor of Dublin Alison Gilliland. He talked with students at the University of Limerick.
4–5 November	Norway	Oslo; Utoya	President Steinmeier travelled to Norway where he met Prime Minister Jonas Gahr Støre who also held a dinner in his honour. He gave a speech at the Storting and had a meeting with President of the Storting Eva Kristin Hansen. He met and had a luncheon with King Harald V of Norway and Queen Sonja of Norway. He visited the University of Oslo and Oslo Opera House. He travelled to Utoya Island to a wreath laying ceremony.
18 November	United States	New York City	President Steinmeier travelled to New York City to visit the National September 11 Memorial & Museum, Center for Jewish History and spoke at the award ceremony for the Leo Baeck Medal.
2 December	France	Strasbourg	President Steinmeier gave a speech at a memorial service for former French President Valéry Giscard d'Estaing

== 2022 ==
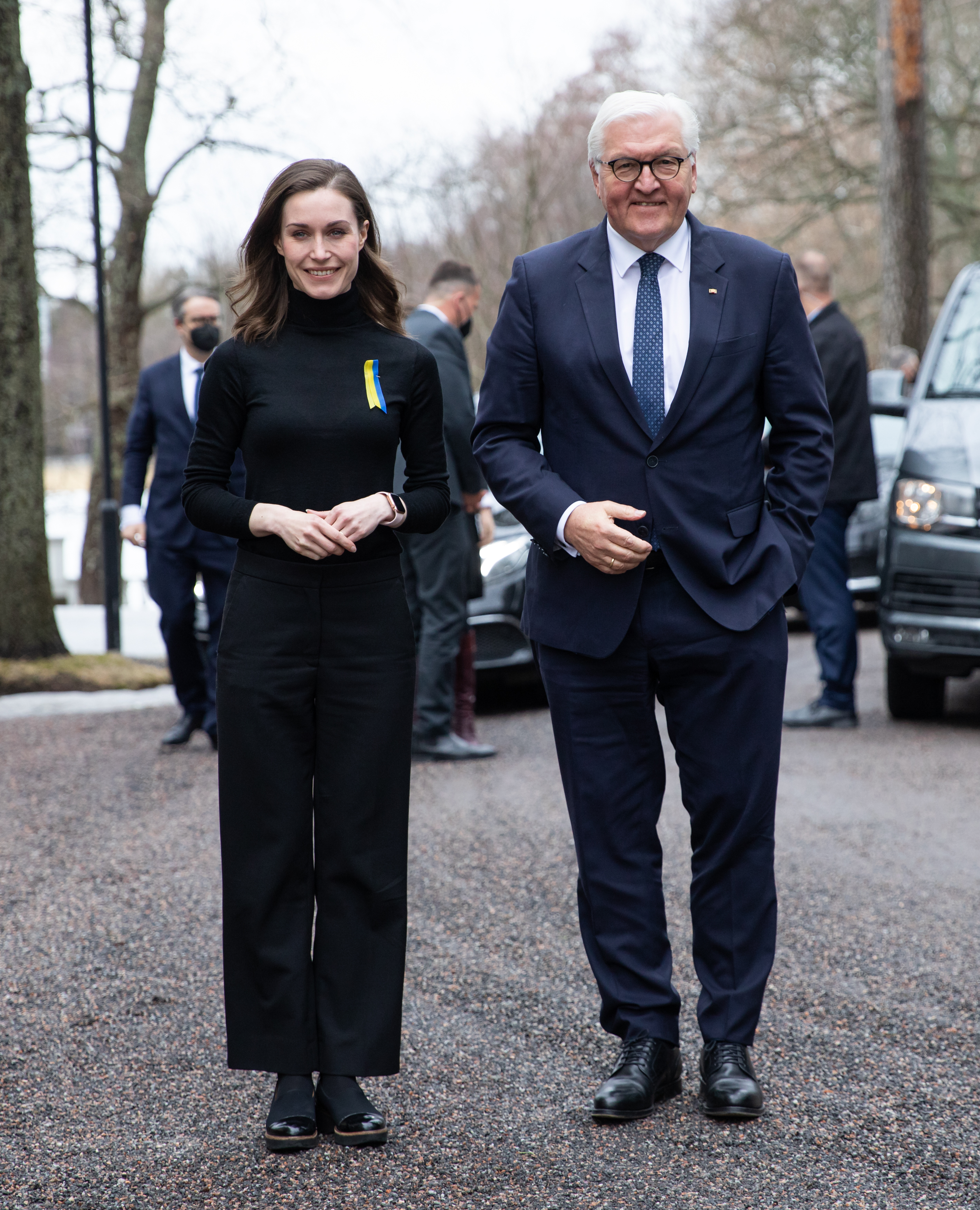
Steinmeier with Finnish Prime Minister Sanna Marin

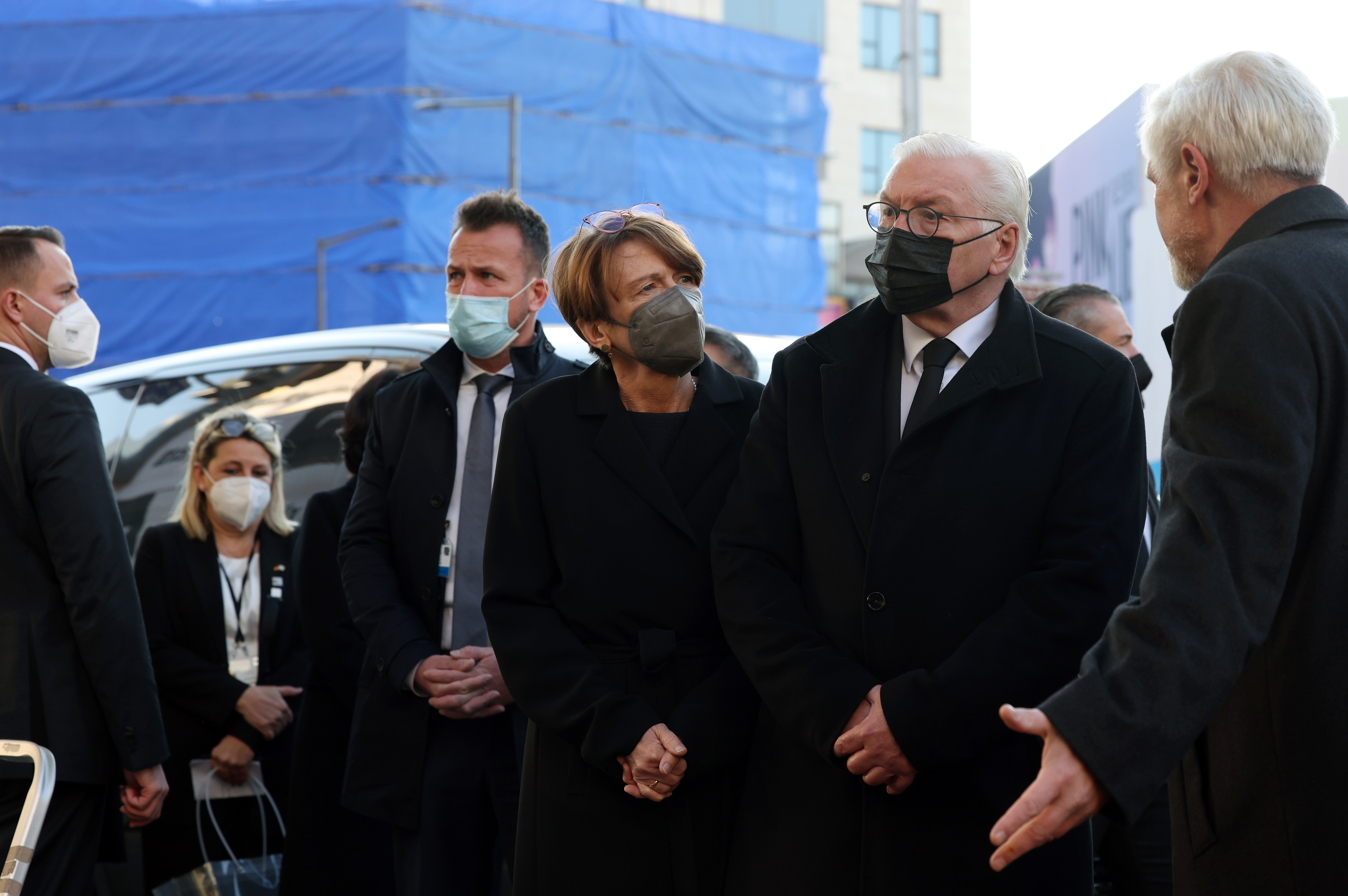
President Steinmeier and his wife Elke Büdenbender in South Korea

Date	Countries	Place visited	Narrative
15–16 February	Latvia	Riga	President Steinmeier gave a speech at the international conference celebrating the 100th anniversary of the Constitution of Latvia.
20–23 February	Senegal	Dakar; Gorée; Bargny	President Steinmeier gave a speech at the laying of the foundation stone for the new building of Goethe-Institut Senegal.
3 March	Lithuania	Vilnius; Rukla	President Steinmeier visited of the German operational contingent of the NATO EFP Battlegroup Lithuania in Rukla together with Gitanas Nausėda.
8 April	Finland	Helsinki	President Steinmeier met with President Sauli Niinistö, for talks about the public debate on relations between Finnish civil society and Russia.
12 April	Poland	Warsaw	President Steinmeier met with President Andrzej Duda. He also had a conversation with Elżbieta Penderecka, the widow of the composer Krzysztof Penderecki.
27 April	Slovakia	Košice; Sliač	President Steinmeier met with President Zuzana Čaputová. He also visited the German contingent of the NATO battlegroup in Sliač.
4 May	Romania	Bucharest	President Steinmeier met with President Klaus Johannis. He also had a discussion with representatives of the German and Jewish minorities in Romania.
15 May	United Arab Emirates	Abu Dhabi	President Steinmeier attended the funeral of President Sheikh Khalifa bin Zayed Al Nahyan.
14–15 June	Singapore	Singapore	President Steinmeier met with President Halimah Yacob, Foreign Minister Vivian Balakrishnan and Deputy Prime Minister Lawrence Wong. He also visited the Asian Civilisations Museum and National Gallery Singapore.
15–16 June	Indonesia	Jakarta; Yogyakarta	President Steinmeier met with President Joko Widodo, Governor of Central Java Ganjar Pranowo and Sultan of Yogyakarta Hamengkubuwono X and Princess Mangkubumi. He laid wreath at the Kalibata Heroes' Cemetery, and also visited the German School Jakarta, Borobudur, Gadjah Mada University and Jogja National Museum.
20–21 June	Latvia	Riga	President Steinmeier participated in the Three Seas Initiative summit, then attended a special service at the St. Peter's Church with President Egils Levits.
12–13 September	Liechtenstein	Vaduz; Schaan	President Steinmeier participated in the meeting of the heads of state of the German-speaking countries.
18–19 September	United Kingdom	London	President Steinmeier and his wife Elke Büdenbender attended the state funeral of Queen Elizabeth II.
19–22 September	Mexico	Mexico City; Guadalajara	President Steinmeier met with President Andrés Manuel López Obrador and Mayor of Mexico City, Claudia Sheinbaum. He also gave a speech to the Senate and attended a concert at the Hospicio Cabañas.
5–7 October	Malta	Valletta; Mdina; Attard; Birżebbuġa	President Steinmeier participated in the meeting of the Arraiolos Group. He also met with President George Vella and the crew of German submarine U-35. He later visited the Church of Our Lady of Victory and German-Maltese Circle.
25 October	Ukraine	Kyiv; Koriukivka	President Steinmeier reiterated German support to Ukraine following the 2022 Russian invasion of Ukraine.
31 October–3 November	Japan	Tokyo; Kyoto	President Steinmeier and Elke Büdenbender met with Emperor Naruhito and Prime Minister Fumio Kishida. He also had a discussion on the 25th anniversary of the Kyoto Protocol.
3–5 November	South Korea	Seoul; Busan	President Steinmeier met with President Yoon Suk-yeol. He also visited the IBS Center for Climate Physics (ICCP) and United Nations Memorial Cemetery.
16–17 November	United States	New York City	President Steinmeier attended the presentation of the Henry Kissinger Prize by the American Academy in Berlin. He later met governor and former ambassador Phil Murphy, president of Eurasia Group Ian Bremmer, and former Secretary of State Henry Kissinger.
29–30 November	North Macedonia	Skopje; Bogdanci; Kavadarci	President Steinmeier met with President Stevo Pendarovski and Prime Minister Dimitar Kovačevski. He also addressed the Parliament, laid wreath at the tomb of Gotse Delchev at the Church of the Ascension of Jesus, and visited Čifte Hammam, followed by discussions about the documentary film Honeyland. He later visited the first wind park in Bogdanci and toured a Dräxlmaier factory in Kavadarci.
1–2 December	Albania	Tirana; Berat	President Steinmeier met with President Bajram Begaj and Prime Minister Edi Rama. He then addressed the Parliament, laid wreath at the Mother Albania Monument in the National Martyrs' Cemetery, and visited Sami Frashëri High School and the Museum of Secret Surveillance. He later went to Berat, where he visited the Lufthansa Industry Solutions, King Mosque, Halveti Tekke and Berat Castle.

== 2023 ==
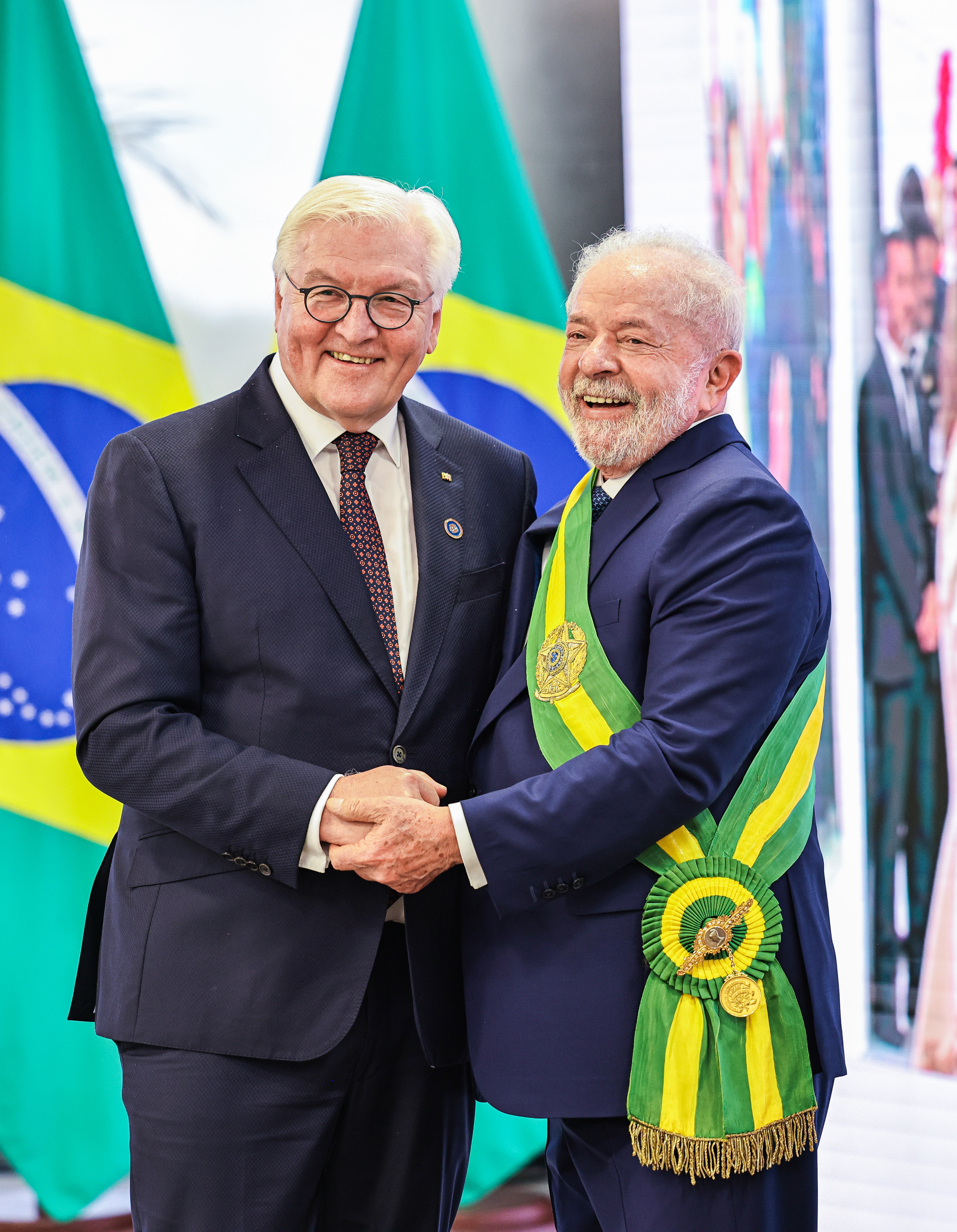
Steinmeier with Brazilian President Luiz Inácio Lula da Silva

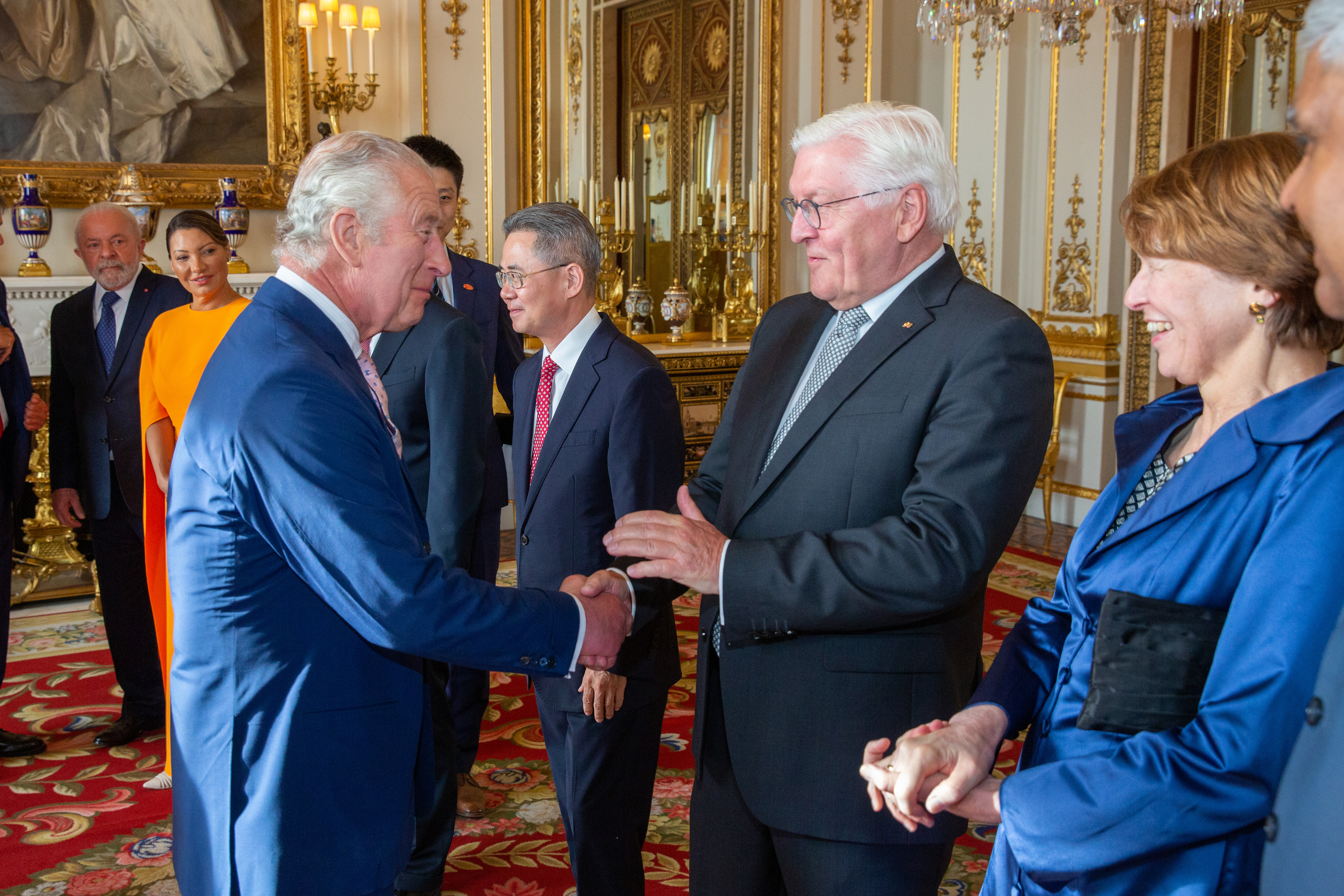
President Steinmeier and Elke Büdenbender with British King Charles III

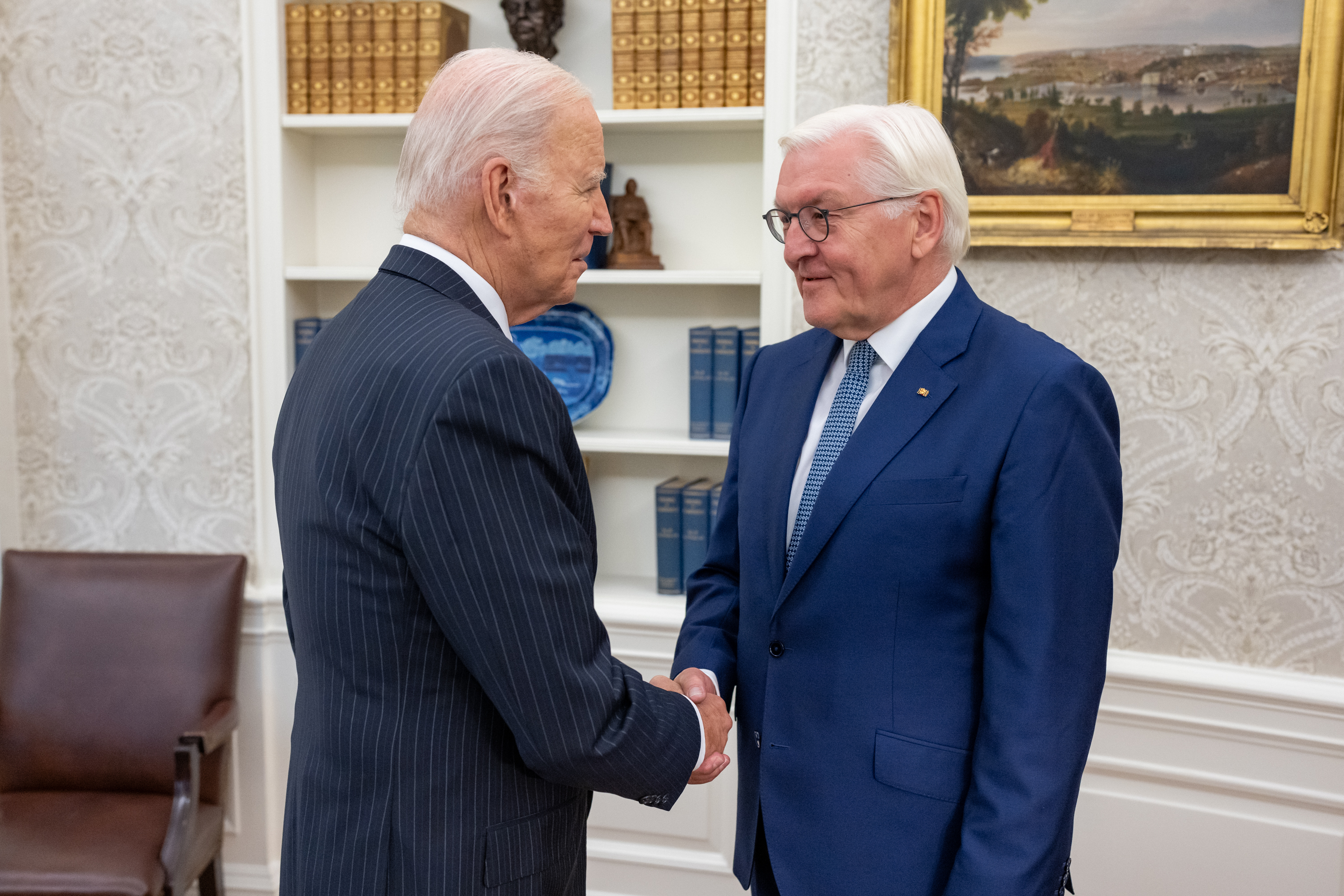
German President Steinmeier with U.S. President Joe Biden

Date	Countries	Place visited	Narrative
1–2 January	Brazil	Brasília; Manaus; Boa Vista	President Steinmeier attended the inauguration of elected president Luiz Inácio Lula da Silva. He then met with the Governor of the state of Amazonas, Wilson Lima, before touring in the Amazon Theatre and Amazon Tall Tower Observatory. He later visited a school in Boa Vista and the Monitoring Center for Deforestation in Manaus.
5 January	Italy; Vatican City	Rome; Vatican City	President Steinmeier and his wife Elke Büdenbender met with Pope Francis, then attended the funeral of Pope Benedict XVI.
6–7 February	Switzerland	Geneva	President Steinmeier met with the United Nations High Commissioner for Human Rights, Volker Türk. He then had a speech during the awarding of the Grand Cross of Merit with Star to Peter Maurer. He later had a conversation with the President of the International Committee of the Red Cross, Mirjana Spoljaric Egger.
13–16 February	Cambodia	Siem Reap; Phnom Penh	President Steinmeier accompanied by his wife Elke Büdenbender toured the humanitarian mine clearance project HALO Trust, followed by Angkor Wat, the German Apsara Conservation Project, and Ta Prohm temple complex. He later met with Say Chhum, Senate President of the Kingdom, then attended a wreath-laying ceremony at the Independence Monument and Statue of King Father Norodom Sihanouk. Afterwards, he held talks with Prime Minister Hun Sen, before visiting the Tuol Sleng Genocide Museum.
16–19 February	Malaysia	Penang; Kuala Lumpur; Kuching	President Steinmeier with his wife Elke Büdenbender visited Infineon and B. Braun company branches in Penang. He then met with King Abdullah and Queen Azizah, and later with Prime Minister Anwar Ibrahim. In Kuching, he toured the Kuching Wetlands National Park and orangutan rehabilitation at the Semenggoh Wildlife Center.
15–16 March	Estonia	Lääne-Harju; Tallinn	President Steinmeier visited the German contingent of the Baltic Air Policing mission at Ämari Air Base. In Tallinn, he held a conversation with President Alar Karis, then attended the awarding of the Order of Merit of the Federal Republic of Germany to former Estonian President Kersti Kaljulaid. He later met with Prime Minister Kaja Kallas and went to Toompea for a statement.
18–19 April	Poland	Warsaw	President Steinmeier met with President Andrzej Duda at the Presidential Palace, before visiting the POLIN Museum of the History of Polish Jews along with President Duda and Israeli President Isaac Herzog. He, with his wife Elke Büdenbender, then commemorated the 80th anniversary of the Warsaw Ghetto Uprising, and gave a speech in front of the Monument to the Ghetto Heroes, to be the first German official guest to do so. He later attended a memorial service at the Nożyk Synagogue, then a concert at the National Theatre.
23–27 April	Canada	Ottawa; Vancouver; Yellowknife; Tuktoyaktuk	Accompanied by his wife, Elke Büdenbender, President Steinmeier was welcomed by Mary Simon, Governor General of Canada. He then laid a wreath at the Tomb of the Unknown Soldier at the National War Memorial. Afterwards, he met with Prime Minister Justin Trudeau at the Parliament Hill, followed by talks with George Furey, Speaker of the Senate, and Anthony Rota, Speaker of the House of Commons, before attending a discussion with students of the University of Ottawa, then a concert at the National Arts Centre. In Vancouver, he toured along with David Eby, Premier of British Columbia, a fuel cell manufacturer, the harbor, and smart energy systems at the University of British Columbia. He later traveled with the Governor General from Yellowknife to Tuktoyaktuk to meet representatives of the Inuit community.
5–6 May	United Kingdom	London	President Steinmeier attended the Coronation of Charles III and Camilla.
24–26 May	Romania	Bucharest; Sibiu; Timișoara	President Steinmeier held talks with President Klaus Iohannis, Prime Minister Nicolae Ciucă, Senate President Alina Gorghiu and Chamber of Deputies President Marcel Ciolacu, before laying wreath at the Tomb of the Unknown Soldier. In Sibiu, he was welcomed by mayor Astrid Fodor, followed by discussions at Samuel von Brukenthal National College. In Timișoara, he visited the Victory Square, Banatul Philharmonic, and the old town along with mayor Dominic Fritz. In addition, he toured the St. George Cathedral, Nikolaus Lenau High School and Cetate Synagogue.
29–30 May	Lithuania	Vilnius; Pabradė	President Steinmeier met with President Gitanas Nausėda, before attending events at the Vilnius University Library and Palace of the Grand Dukes of Lithuania. He later visited the German forces of the NATO Enhanced Forward Presence.
19–21 June	Kazakhstan	Astana; Aqtau; Kuryk	President Steinmeier laid wreath at the Otan Qorgaushylar Monument, before he met President Kassym-Jomart Tokayev at the Ak Orda Presidential Palace. He later attended two conferences about the cooperation between the two countries in business and higher education, followed by touring the National Museum. At Aqtau, he visited the Yessenov University and Svevind Energy company. He concluded his visit by touring Kuryk port.
21–23 June	Kyrgyzstan	Bishkek	President Steinmeier laid wreath at the Ata-Beyit, before he met President Sadyr Japarov. He later visited the OSCE Academy together with Helga Schmid, followed by touring the Ala-Archa Nature Park.
9–11 July	Luxemburg	Luxembourg; Esch-sur-Alzette	President Steinmeier and his wife Elke Büdenbender met with Grand Duke Henri and Grand Duchess Maria Teresa at the Grand Ducal Palace. He then laid wreath at the National Monument of Luxembourg Solidarity, before visiting the Luxembourg National Archives. He later held talks with Parliament President Fernand Etgen, Prime Minister Xavier Bettel and Foreign Minister Jean Asselborn. Afterward, he toured the capital city with mayor Lydie Polfer. Later on, he visited the birthplace of Robert Schuman and the University of Luxembourg.
31 August–1 September	France	Paris	President Steinmeier attended a dinner hosted by President Emmanuel Macron and his wife Brigitte at the Élysée Palace.
11–12 September	Belgium	Brussels; Eupen	President Steinmeier attended the meeting of the German-speaking heads of states.
20–22 September	Italy	Syracuse; Piazza Armerina; Catania; Venice	President Steinmeier accompanied by his wife Elke Büdenbender met with President Sergio Mattarella and his daughter Laura. He later gave a speech during the Award ceremony for the second German-Italian town twinning prize, held at Syracuse Municipal Theatre. Afterwards, he toured the island of Ortygia, then attended a theatre performance at the Greek Theatre of Syracuse. On the next day, he went to areas affected by wildfires at Piazza Armerina and Enna, before visiting the Villa Romana del Casale, and the 3Sun factory in Catania. He then flew to Venice, where he visited the German Centre for Venetian Studies and 18th Biennale Architettura.
26 September	Italy	Rome	President Steinmeier attended the funeral of former president Giorgio Napolitano.
3–5 October	Cape Verde	Praia; Cidade Velha; Mindelo	President Steinmeier met with President José Maria Pereira Neves, where he was then bestowed the Amílcar Cabral Prize, and the keys to the city of Praia by Mayor Francisco Carvalho. He later laid wreath at the Memorial Amílcar Cabral, and made a speech in the National Assembly. He then held talks with Prime Minister, José Ulisses Correia e Silva in the Várzea Palace. In Cidade Velha, he toured the Fort of São Filipe and Nossa Senhora do Rosário church. On the next day, he flew to Mindelo, where he visited the Ocean Science Centre, Cape Verde Atmospheric Observatory and Centro Nacional de Artesanato e Design.
5–6 October	Portugal	Porto	President Steinmeier participated in the 18th Arraiolos Group meeting.
6 October	United States	Washington, D.C.	President Steinmeier met with President Joe Biden to mark the occasion of German-American Day.
30 October–1 November	Tanzania	Dar es Salaam; Songea	President Steinmeier was welcomed with military honors by Minister of Foreign Affairs, January Makamba. The next day, he met with President Samia Suluhu Hassan, and representatives of German and Tanzanian businesses including Twiga Cement and Heidelberg Materials. In Songea, he toured the Maji Maji Memorial Museum and held talks with descendants of Chief Songea Mbano.
1–3 November	Zambia	Lusaka; Livingstone	President Steinmeier was welcomed with military honors by President Hakainde Hichilema, then paid a visit to the Fountain Gate Crafts & Trades School, which is affiliated with the Chamber of Skilled Crafts of Frankfurt-Rhine-Main. In Livingstone, he toured a water extraction plant on the Zambezi river, the Victoria Falls and the Mosi-oa-Tunya National Park.
26–27 November	Israel	Tel Aviv; Jerusalem; Be'eri	President Steinmeier, accompanied by his wife Elke Büdenbender and President of the German Bundestag, Bärbel Bas met Israeli President Isaac Herzog in Jerusalem, before they toured the location of Be'eri massacre. Later on, he held talks with Prime Minister Benjamin Netanyahu, and visited the Augusta Victoria Hospital.
28–29 November	Oman	Muscat; Nizwa	President Steinmeier met with Sultan of Oman, Haitham bin Tariq. He then toured the Nizwa Fort and Sultan Qaboos Grand Mosque.
29 November	Qatar	Doha	President Steinmeier met with Emir of Qatar, Sheikh Tamim bin Hamad.

== 2024 ==
Date	Countries	Place visited	Narrative
5 January	France	Élysée Palace	Participation in the funeral service for Jacques Delors.
23–24 January	Vietnam	Hanoi; Ho Chi Minh City	President Steinmeier was joined by his wife Elke Büdenbender, Labor Minister Hubertus Heil and a delegation of business leaders from top German industrial firms on a four-day tour to Southeast Asia. In Hanoi, he visited the Temple of Literature and laid wreath at the Memorial to the Revolutionary Martyrs. In addition, he met with President of Vietnam Vo Van Thuong, Chairman of the National Assembly Vuong Dinh Hue, General Secretary of the Communist Party of Vietnam Nguyễn Phú Trọng, and Prime Minister Phạm Minh Chính. In Ho Chi Minh City, he toured the Vietnamese-German University.
25–26 January	Thailand	Bangkok; Ubon Ratchathani	President Steinmeier walked through Talat Noi, before he met with King Rama X, Queen Suthida in Dusit Palace, Prime Minister Srettha Thavisin, and leader of the Move Forward Party, Chaithawat Tulathon. He also visited a Mercedes-Benz plant in Samut Prakan. He later toured rice farms in Ubon Ratchathani, as well as Sirindhorn Dam and Pha Taem National Park.
6–8 February	Mongolia	Ulaanbaatar; Töv Province	President Steinmeier accompanied by his wife Elke Büdenbender was welcomed by President Ukhnaagiin Khürelsükh and his wife Luvsandorjiin Bolortsetseg in the Sükhbaatar Square. He also held talks with Prime Minister Luvsannamsrain Oyun-Erdene and Chairman of the State Great Hural Gombojav Zandanshatar. He later toured the Munkh Cashmere knitwear business, Chinggis Khaan National Museum and Alexander von Humboldt Schule, before meeting with a nomadic family holding preparations for celebrating the Tsagaan Sar in Töv Province.
11–13 February	Cyprus	Larnaca; Nicosia; Kofinou; Pano Lefkara; Kato Drys	President Steinmeier met with President Nikos Christodoulides, President of the House of Representatives Annita Demetriou and mayor of Nicosia Constantinos Yiorkadjis, as well as Stavros Stavrou, President of the Cyprus Chamber of Commerce and Industry. He also visited the UNFICYP headquarters, Goethe-Institut Cyprus, House of Representatives and Presidential Palace. He later toured the Archbishop Makarios III Lyceum and Kofinou Reception, in addition to embroidery and Silversmith-work in Pano Lefkara.
23–25 February	Namibia	Windhoek	President Steinmeier attended the funeral ceremonies for President Hage Geingob.
22–24 April	Turkey	Istanbul; Gaziantep; Ankara	President Steinmeier met with Ekrem İmamoğlu, Mayor of Istanbul at the Sirkeci railway station. He then held talks with representatives of German companies in Eminönü, before attending a cultural evening at the Summer Residence of the German Ambassador in Tarabya, followed by visiting The Museum of Innocence where he conversed with author Orhan Pamuk. He later met with representatives of civil society and toured a DHL Express logistics center. In Gaziantep, he visited Gazikent primary school and an accommodation center for earthquake victims in Nurdağı. Afterwards, he laid wreath at Anıtkabir, followed by a meeting at Ankara University with Mayor Mansur Yavaş, culminating in discussions at the Presidential Complex with President Recep Tayyip Erdoğan. Subsequently, he engaged in talks with Özgür Özel, leader of the CHP.
29–30 April	Czech Republic	Prague	President Steinmeier met with President Petr Pavel at Prague Castle. He then attended a commemoration ceremony at the Faculty of Arts, Charles University for victims of the 2023 shooting rampage. Afterwards, he delivered a speech on the 20th anniversary of the EU's Eastern enlargement. He later visited František Černý's grave at the Vyšehrad Cemetery, followed by touring Josefov marking the 100th anniversary of Franz Kafka's death. He subsequently attended a musical performance at State Opera, before meeting Prime Minister Petr Fiala.
10 June	France	Oradour-sur-Glane	President Steinmeier attended the commemoration ceremony on the 80th Anniversary of the Oradour-sur-Glane Massacre
31 July	Poland	Warsaw	President Steinmeier attended the commemoration ceremony on the 80th anniversary of the beginning of the Warsaw Uprising against German occupation
19 August	Hungary	Sopron	President Steinmeier attended the 35th anniversary of the Pan-European Picnic
10–12 September	Egypt	Cairo	Official visit
29–31 October	Greece	Athens	Official visit
10–12 December	Nigeria	Abuja, Lagos	Official visit
13 December	South Africa	Johannesburg	Official visit
14 December	Lesotho	Maseru	Official visit

== 2025 ==
Date	Countries	Place visited	Narrative
2–3 February	Saudi Arabia	Riyadh	Official visit
4 February	Jordan	Amman	Official visit
5 February	Turkey	Ankara	Official visit
28 February–2 March	Uruguay	Montevideo	Official visit
2–3 March	Paraguay	Asunción	Official visit
4–6 March	Chile	Santiago	Official visit
30 March–1 April	Armenia	Yerevan	Official visit
2 April	Azerbaijan	Baku	Official visit
26 April	Vatican City	Vatican City	President Steinmeier attended the funeral of Pope Francis
28 April	Belgium	Brussels	President Steinmeier travelled to Brussels to mark the 70th anniversary of Germany's NATO membership
17–20 June	Japan	Tokyo	Official visit
6–7 July	Lithuania	Vilnius	Official visit
8 July	Latvia	Riga	Official visit
22 September	Italy	Rome	President Steinmeier met with representatives of United Nations organisations based in Rome
22 September	Vatican City	Vatican City	President Steinmeier met with Pope Leo XIV
9–10 October	Estonia	Tallinn	President Steinmeier attended the 20th Arraiolos Meeting
21–23 October	Austria	Vienna	State visit
1–2 November	Egypt	Cairo	
3–4 November	Ghana	Accra	
5–7 November	Angola	Luanda	
15 November	Italy	Rome	Met with President Sergio Mattarella
26-28 November	Spain	Madrid; Guernica	State visit
3-5 December	United Kingdom	London; Windsor; Coventry	State visit

== 2026 ==
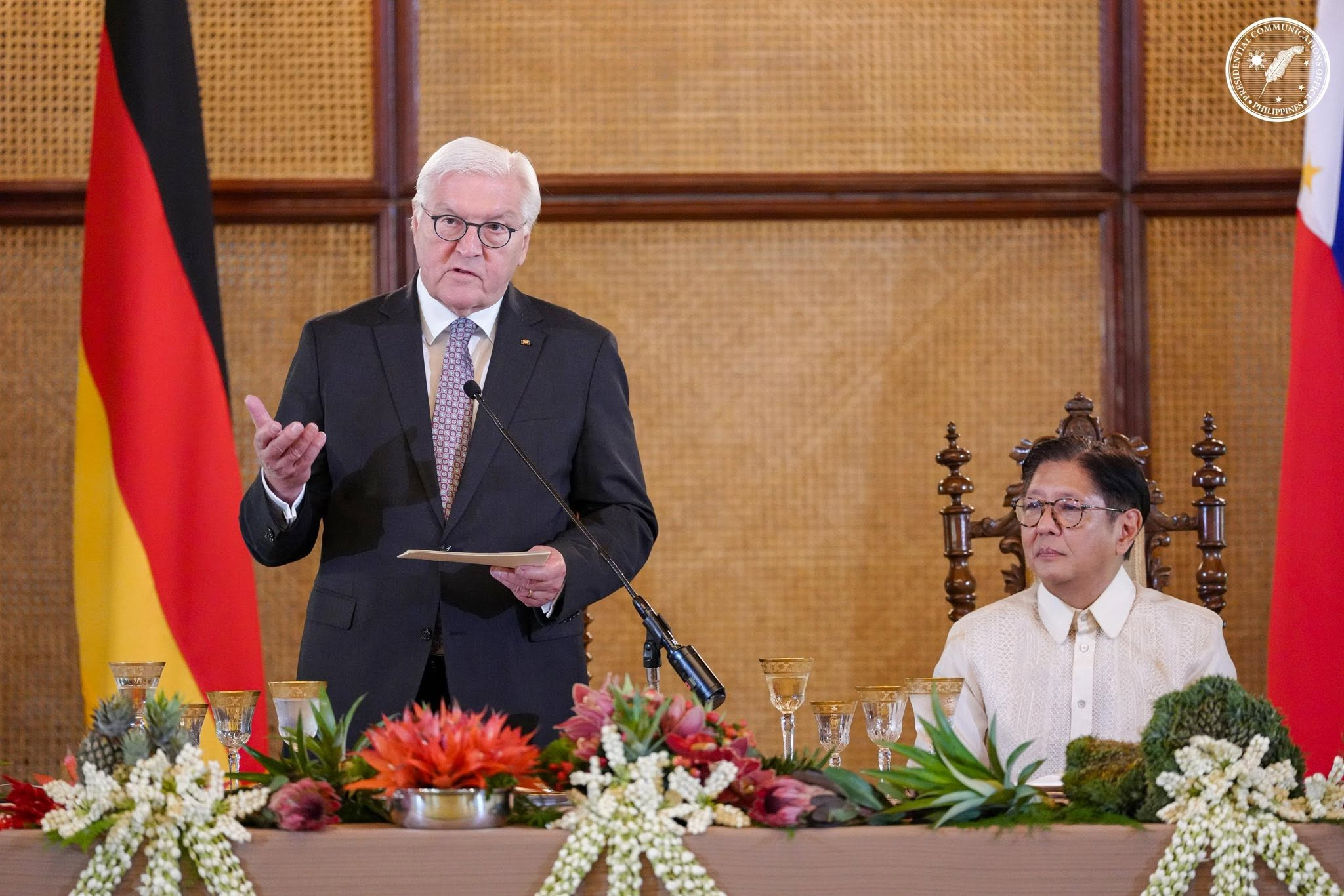
Steinmeier with Philippine President Bongbong Marcos

Date	Countries	Place visited	Narrative
6-8 February	Italy	Milan	Attended the 2026 Winter Olympics opening ceremony.
15-17 February	Lebanon	Beirut	Working visit.
17-18 February	Jordan	Amman	Working visit.
16 March	Panama	Panama City	State visit.
17-18 March	Guatemala	Guatemala City	State visit.
19 March	Mexico	Cancún	Bilateral meeting with the president Claudia Sheinbaum.
6 May	Sweden	Stockholm	Met with King Carl XVI Gustaf and Prime Minister Ulf Kristersson.
7 May	Finland	Helsinki	Met with President Alexander Stubb and Prime Minister Petteri Orpo.
9-11 June	Netherlands	Amsterdam, The Hague	State visit.
15 June	Indonesia	Jakarta	State visit, Bilateral meeting with president Prabowo Subianto for a couple of hours.
16 June	Philippines	Manila	State visit, Bilateral meeting with president Bongbong Marcos.
17-18 June	Uzbekistan	Tashkent	State visit.
9 September	Norway	Oslo	President Steinmeier attended the funeral ceremony for King Harald V.
26 October–2 November	China	Anhui, Beijing	State visit.
