= Olga Manuilova =

Soviet sculptor (1893–1984)

- Ольга Максимилиановна Мануйлова
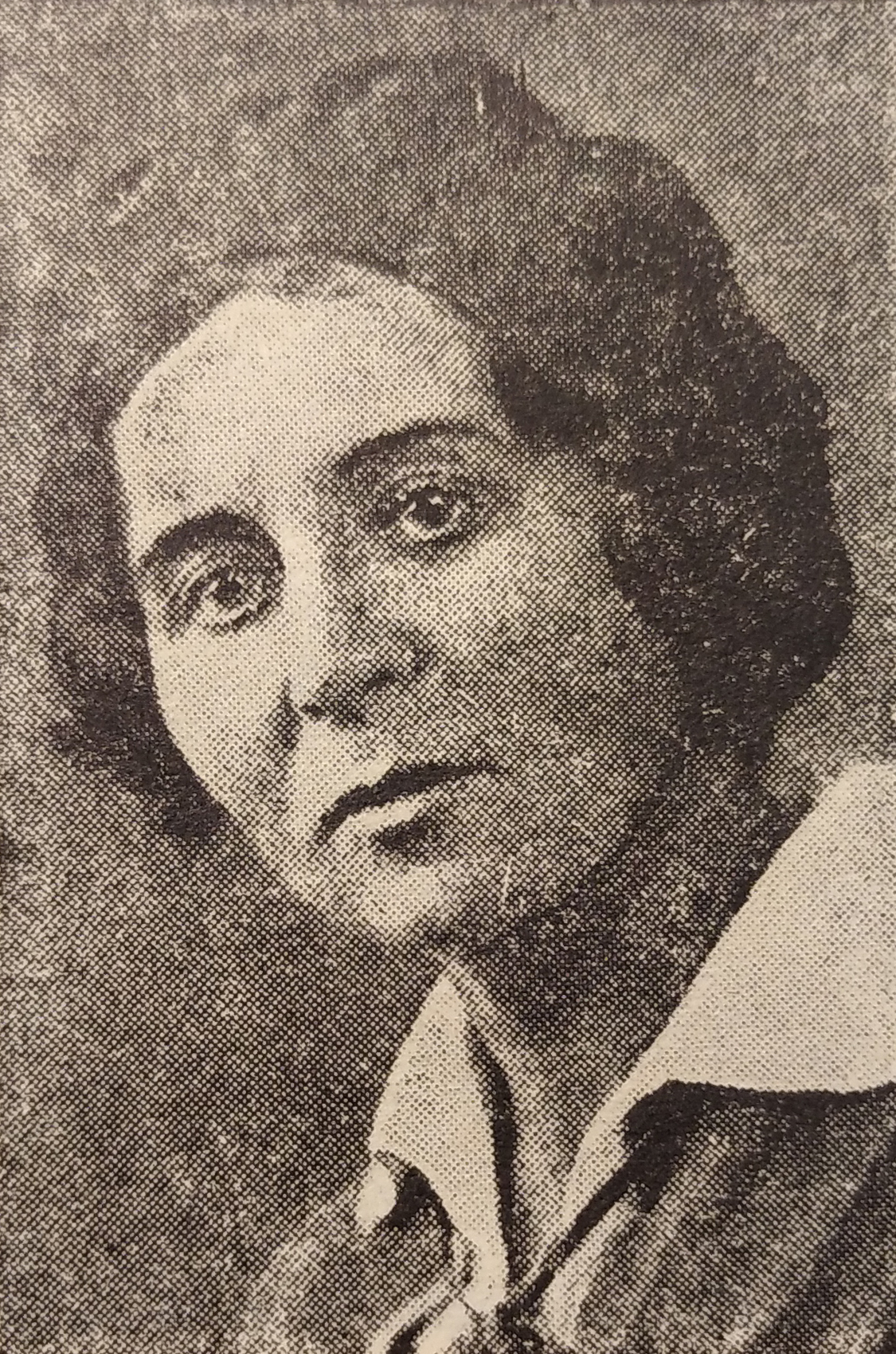
- Born: 17 October 1893; Nizhny Novgorod
- Died: 26 January 1984 (aged 90); Bishkek
- Alma mater: Moscow School of Painting, Sculpture and Architecture
- Occupation: Sculptor
- Awards: Order of the Red Banner of Labour; Medal "For Labour Valour"; Order of the Badge of Honour; People’s Artist of the Kyrgyz SSR

Olga Maksimilianovna Manuilova (Russian: Ольга Максимилиановна Мануйлова; 17 October 1893 – 26 January 1984) was a Soviet sculptor who worked in Kyrgyzstan.

Olga Manuilova was born on 17 October 1893 in Nizhny Novgorod.

In 1912, she studied sculpture at the Munich studios of Franz Hofstötter and Hans Schwegerle. She went on to attend the Moscow School of Painting, Sculpture and Architecture, studying under Sergei Volnukhin, Konstantin Korovin, Leonid Pasternak, and Nikolay Kasatkin.

Invited in 1939 to work on a monument to Toktogul Satylganov in Bishkek, she spent the rest of her life in Kyrgyzstan. Her works of sculpture in cement and granite include monuments to General Ivan Panfilov (1942), Togolok Moldo (1963) and cosmonaut Vladimir Komarov (1969). Other work includes the bas-relief Soviet Constitution on the House of the Procurator (1941) and decorative groups in the Kirghiz Theater of Opera and Ballet (1952-55). Her bronze bust of Paul Robeson was placed atop Peak Robeson in the Trans-Ili Alatau range.

Olga Manuilova was awarded the Order of the Red Banner of Labour and People’s Artist of the Kyrgyz SSR. She was the subject of the documentary film Sculptor Olga Manuilova (1982), directed by Tolomush Okeyev.

The asteroid 3186 Manuilova is named for her.
