= The Ferocious One =

1974 film

- Film poster
- Directed by: Tolomush Okeyev
- Written by: Andrey Konchalovskiy; Eduard Tropinin
- Starring: Kambar Valiyev; Suimenkul Chokmorov
- Cinematography: Kydyrzhan Kydyraliyev
- Production company: Kazakhfilm
- Release date: 15 January 1974
- Running time: 97 minutes
- Country: Soviet Union
- Language: Russian

The Ferocious One (Russian: Лютый, romanized: Lyutyy, also known as The Fierce One, Kazakh language: Көксерек / Kökserek) is a 1974 Soviet drama film directed by Tolomush Okeyev. It was selected as the Soviet entry for the Best Foreign Language Film at the 47th Academy Awards, but was not accepted as a nominee.

== Name of Kokserek ==
Коксерек (Kokserek) or Көксерек (Kökserek) is a name given to strong, tough wolves. The name is a combination of the Kazakh words "Көк" ("blue" color, metaphorically "sky") and "Серек" ("protruding" for ears, metaphorically "hearing well").

== Plot ==
The movie is adapted from a story named Kökserek of Kazakh author Mukhtar Auezov.

The film tells the story of friendship of a little boy who lives in the desert and a wolf cub. The boy named this wolf cub "Kokserek" (In Kazakh language it is pronounced exactly as "Kökserek".)

One day, Kurmash's uncle takes him hunting, where on the way they come across a she-wolf with cubs. His uncle kills five cubs, but the boy takes the last puppy home. So a wolf cub named Kokserek begins to live in the house. They play together and grow up together. They are friends without the knowledge that people and wolves are enemies. The child's heart does not accept the ruthlessness and cruelty of the adult world. When people want to kill the grown animal, the boy sets his friend free. The adult wolf became extremely feral when released into the wild. Many years later, they meet again.

There is also a Kyrgyz hard-dubbed version.

== Festivals ==
- Locarno International Film Festival; 1974, Special Mention
- Chicago International Film Festival; 1975

== Cast ==
- Kambar Valiyev as Kurmash
- Suimenkul Chokmorov as Akhangul
- Aliman Zhankorozova as Grandma
- K. Satyev as Hassen
- N. Ikhtimbayev as Son of the Bey

== Bibliography ==
- Yönetmenler-Filmler-Ülkeler - 2, Atilla Dorsay, Varlık Yayınları, 1988, P:234-236 - "Kurt Kanı" (in Turkish)
- Евгений Данилович Сурков, Люди и волки (О худож. фильме «Лютый») // Искусство кино, № 5, 1974. — стр. 39—50 (in Russian)

== See also ==
- List of submissions to the 47th Academy Awards for Best Foreign Language Film
- List of Soviet submissions for the Academy Award for Best Foreign Language Film
