= The Descendant of the Snow Leopard =

1984 film

- Directed by: Tolomush Okeyev
- Written by: Tolomush Okeyev; Mar Bajdzhiyev
- Starring: Dokhdurbek Kydyraliyev
- Cinematography: Nurtai Borbiyev
- Release date: 1984
- Running time: 134 minutes
- Country: Soviet Union
- Language: Russian

The Descendant of the Snow Leopard (Kyrgyz: Ак илбирстин тукуму, translit: Ak ilbirstin tukumu; Russian: Потомок Белого Барса, translit: Potomok belogo barsa) is a 1984 Soviet adventure drama film directed by Tolomush Okeyev. It was entered into the 35th Berlin International Film Festival where it won the Silver Bear for an outstanding single achievement.

The story told in the movie is based on a Kyrgyz folk tale.

== Plot ==
Film tells the story of a hunter community living in the highlands, who had to ask for help from the people of the plain in order to survive a very harsh winter. Developing events will lead to the emergence of a love story. The belief that violating the traditional hunting restriction will result in disaster is also included in the narrative.

== Cast ==
- Dokhdurbek Kydyraliyev as Koshoshash
- Aliman Zhankorozova as Saikal
- Doskhan Zholzhaksynov as Mundusbai
- Gulnara Alimbayeva as Aike
- Ashir Chokubayev as Kassen
- Marat Zhanteliyev as Sayak
- Dzhamal Seidakhmatova as Begaim
- Gulnara Kydyraliyeva as Sulaika
- K. Akmatova as Batma
- Ajbek Kydyraliyev as Kalygul
- Akyl Kulanbayev as Karypbai
- Svetlana Chebodayeva-Chaptykova as Sonun

== Awards ==
- 1985 – 18 All-Union Film Festival in Minsk main prize and diploma in the program of feature films.

== Bibliography ==
- Descendant of the Snow Leopard (Potomok Belogo Barza), Bampfa, 24 October 1986
- The Descendant of the Snow Leopard (Potomok belogo barsa), Cinemas-Asie: "Kyrgyzstan", Access date: 9 June 2022
