= Tattybübü Tursunbayeva =

Kyrgyz actress

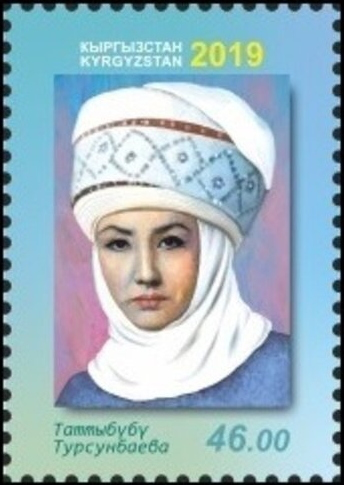
Tursunbayeva on a 2019 stamp of Kyrgyzstan

Tattybübü Tursunbayeva (Kyrgyz: Таттыбүбү Турсунбаева, [tɑttɯbyby tursunbɑjeva]; 12 July 1944, Chayek village, Jumgal District, Naryn Region, Kyrgyzstan – 21 December 1981) was a well-known artist of the Kirghiz Soviet Socialist Republic, USSR, and a member of the Soviet cinematographer's union and Kyrgyzstan's theatre guild.

She studied in Chayek village's Russian middle school. In 1960, when she was 16, she was recorded for the first time in the short feature "Salima's Song". At the age of 17, she got into the acting department at A. N. Ostrovsky Theatre Institute in Tashkent.

In 1966 she joined the Kyrgyz state academic drama theatre's troupe. She played in more than thirty classical Soviet and world plays by writers such as Shakespeare, Lope de Vega, García Lorca, Chingiz Aytmatov, Mohammed Karim, and J. Schwartz—for example, Romeo and Juliet, The House of Bernarda Alba, The Dance Instructor, Asel / Delbirim, Anvar (Russian: Восхождение на Фудзияму / Kyrgyz: Фудзиямадагы кадыр түн), etc. She also appeared in a number of movies.

== Filmography ==
- 1960 – "Salima's Song" (Kyrgyz: Салиманын ыры)
- 1965 – Kyrgyz: Эң тил алчаак
- 1967 – Kyrgyz: Саманчынын жолу (Russian: Материнское Поле)
- 1968 – Kyrgyz: Ак-Мөөр
- 1971 – Kyrgyz: Уркуя
- 1971 – Поклонись огню (translated into English as Worship of Fire from Kyrgyz and Bow Down to Fire from Russian), a biographical film of Urkuya Salieva
- 1972 – Kyrgyz: Бул жакка ак-куулар учуп келет
- 1973 – Kyrgyz: Кичинекей аскер
- 1974 – Kyrgyz: Сүйүүнүн жаңырыгы
- 1975 – Kyrgyz: Кызыл алма, Kyrgyz: Арман
- 1976 – Kyrgyz: Алтын күз
- 1979 – Kyrgyz: Процесс
