= Suimenkul Chokmorov =

Kyrgyz actor (1939-1992)

- Сүймөнкул Чокморов
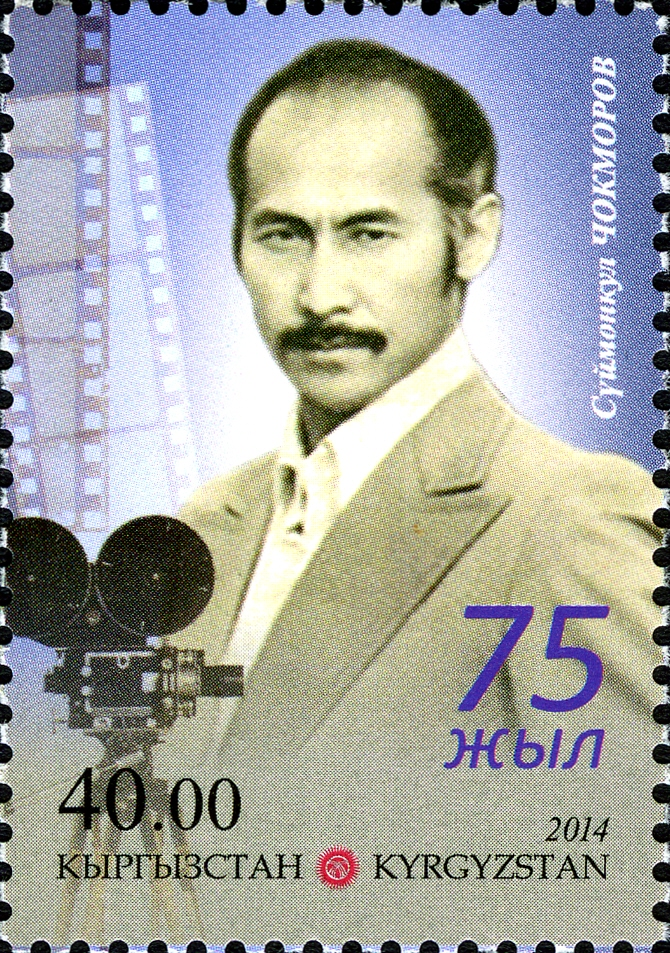
- 2014 stamp of Kyrgyzstan
- Born: November 9, 1939; Chong-Tash, Kirghiz SSR, Soviet Union
- Died: September 26, 1992 (aged 52); Bishkek, Kyrgyzstan
- Occupation: Actor
- Years active: 1969–1986

Suimenkul Chokmorov (Note: Kyrgyz: Сүймөнкул Чокморов, romanized: Su̇ĭmȯnkul Chokmorov, sometimes given as Süymönqul Çoqmorov; Russian: Суйменкул Чокморов, romanized: Suymenkul Chokmorov) (9 November 1939 – 26 September 1992) was a Kyrgyz film actor born in Chong-Tash village, Kirghiz SSR (now Kyrgyzstan). In 1964 he graduated from the Leningrad Academy of Arts and later taught painting and composition at the Arts School of Frunze. In 1977 he was a member of the jury at the 10th Moscow International Film Festival.

== Filmography ==
Year	Title	Role	Notes
1968	Jamilya	Daniyar	
1968	Karash Karalash ("A Shooting at the Karash Pass")		
1970	Extraordinary Commissar	Nizametdin Khodzhayev	
1972	Bow To The Fire	Utur-Usta	
1972	Scarlet Poppies of Issyk-Kul	Karabalta	
1973	I Am Tien Shan		
1973	The Seventh Bullet	Maxumov	
1974	The Ferocious One	Akhangul	
1975	The Red Apple	Temir	
1975	Dersu Uzala	Chzhan Bao	
1976	The Life And Death of Ferdinand Luce	Lao	
1977	Ulan	Azat Bayramov	
1980	Early Cranes	Father	
1981	Men Without Women	Kasym	
1984	The Pitfall	Turabayev	
1984	The Sunday Jorneys		(segment "Voskresnyye progulki")
1984	The First		(final film role)
