= The Red Apple (film) =

1975 film

- Directed by: Tolomush Okeyev
- Written by: Chingiz Aitmatov; Tolomush Okeyev
- Starring: Gulsara Adzhibekova; Suimenkul Chokmorov
- Cinematography: Konstantin Orozaliyev
- Release date: July 1975
- Country: Soviet Union
- Language: Russian

The Red Apple (Russian: Красное яблоко, romanized: Krasnoe yabloko) is a Soviet drama film directed by Tolomush Okeyev. It was entered into the 9th Moscow International Film Festival.

The screenplay is based on a short story by writer Chinghiz Aitmatov.

== Plot ==
The film explores the lives of modern Kyrgyz intellectuals, chronicling several days in the life of a small family and reflecting on the challenges of human relationships and complex love. It delves into the spiritual depth and fulfillment born from love, even when it is unrequited and painful.

A young man named Temir encounters a girl of extraordinary beauty and falls in love with her from afar, in secret. His idealistic feelings, however, clash with the harshness of everyday life—when he tries to present her with a red apple, a beautiful symbol of his dreams for happiness, he meets misunderstanding and even hostility.

Years later, now a well-known artist, Temir is still haunted by dreams of this angelic girl, nameless yet holding a red apple in her hands.

== Cast ==
- Gulsara Adzhibekova
- Suimenkul Chokmorov
- Anara Makhekadirova
- Tattybyubyu Tursunbayeva
