= State visit by Frank-Walter Steinmeier to the United Kingdom =

2025 state visit by President of Germany

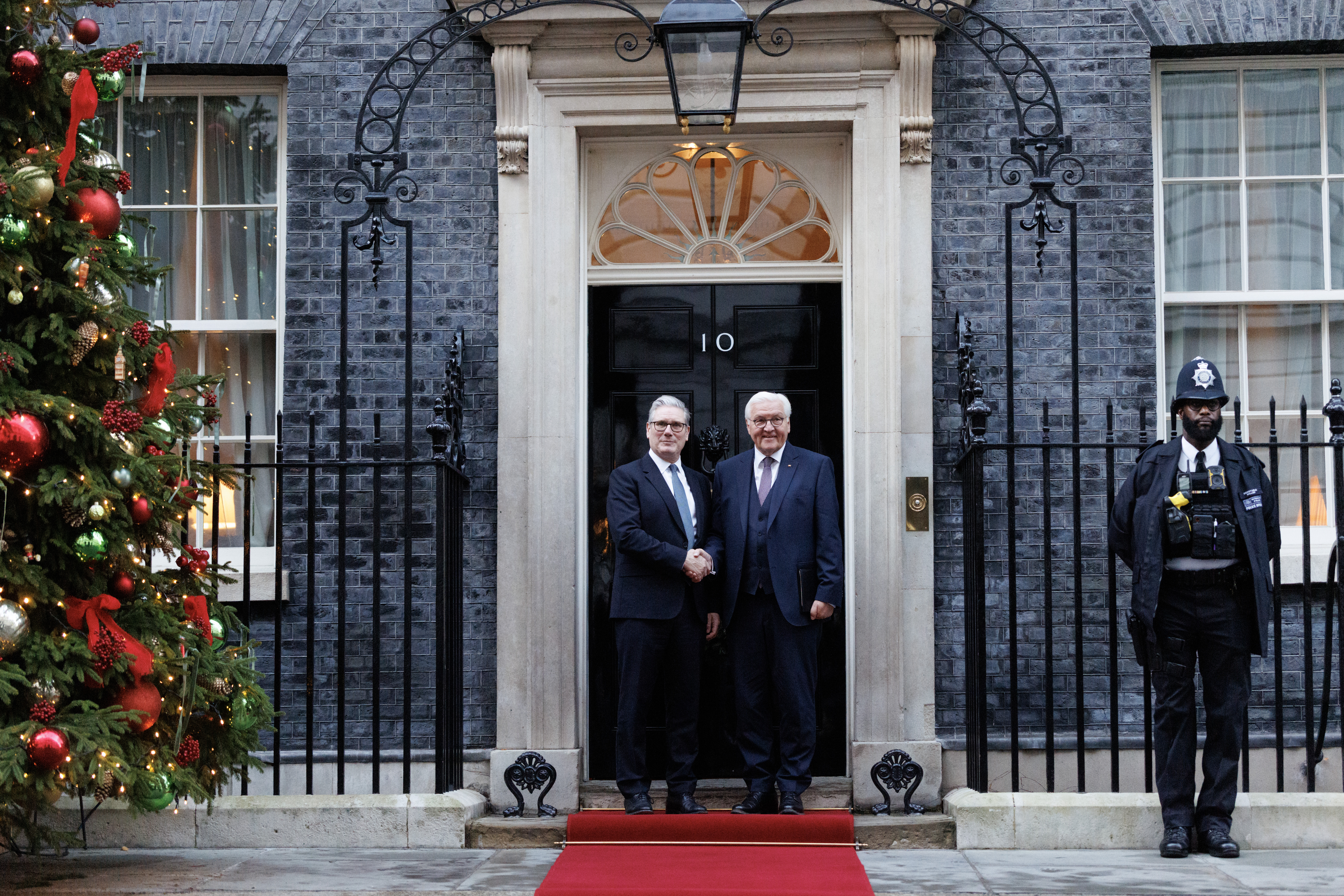
- Date: 3 to 5 December 2025
- Location: Windsor; London; Coventry
- Type: State visit
- Participants: President Frank-Walter Steinmeier; Elke Büdenbender; King Charles III; Queen Camilla

German President Frank-Walter Steinmeier and his wife, Elke Büdenbender, paid a state visit to the United Kingdom from 3 to 5 December 2025. They were welcomed by King Charles III and Queen Camilla at Windsor Castle. This was the first state visit by a German president in 27 years.

During the visit, Steinmeier met UK Prime Minister Keir Starmer and business leaders, addressed the UK parliament and also visited the ruins of Coventry Cathedral to commemorate the Coventry Blitz.

== Background ==
King Charles III and Queen Camilla had made a successful state visit to Germany in 2023, which was the first overseas state visit of the new reign.

The 3-day visit by the German president followed a treaty between Germany and the UK signed in the 2025 summer, known as the Kensington Treaty, which agreed to create a direct rail link between London and Berlin, as part of measures bringing the countries closer together.

== Programme ==
=== 3 December ===
The President and First Lady landed at Heathrow Airport and were escorted to the Royal Dais in Windsor by the Prince and Princess of Wales. The King and Queen later formally welcomed the couple at Windsor Castle, where they rode in a horse-drawn carriage and reviewed a military guard of honour. A 41-gun royal salute to mark the visit was fired simultaneously from Windsor Home Park by The King's Troop Royal Horse Artillery and from the Tower of London by the Honourable Artillery Company. After the lunch, the president and first lady viewed a special display of German related items from the Royal Collection.

In the afternoon, President Steinmeier visited Prime Minister Sir Keir Starmer at 10 Downing Street, where they discussed economic cooperation, Russia-Ukraine war and illegal migration.

The first day of the visit concluded with a state banquet at Windsor Castle with 152 guests, including politicians, business leaders and celebrities.

=== 4 December ===
The second day began with a private wreath-laying ceremony at the tomb of Queen Elizabeth II in St George's Chapel. Jointed by The King and Queen, the presidential couple attended a reception with volunteers at Windsor Castle, centred on social engagement and community service.

Later, the Federal President laid a wreath at the Grave of the Unknown Warrior in Westminster Abbey and delivered an address to the Parliament of the United Kingdom at the Palace of Westminster. Steinmeier and Secretary of State for Culture Lisa Nandy toured the V&A East at the Queen Elizabeth Olympic Park in Stratford, where they viewed the archival David Bowie Collection. President Steinmeier was also joined by international football stars Georgia Stanway and Kai Havertz at the Bobby Moore Academy in east London to see first-hand sport’s powers of inclusion and impact on local communities.

At the end of the day, the President, accompanied by the Princess Royal, went to the Guildhall for a dinner hosted by the Lady Mayor of London, Dame Susan Langley.

=== 5 December ===
The President and Elke Büdenbender travelled to Coventry Cathedral, a site heavily bombed by the German Army during the Second World War. In a symbolic ceremony, a German wreath was laid by the couple at the Cathedral Ruins, which was famously destroyed during an air raid 85 years ago. The Duke of Kent also lay a wreath alongside the couple.

During his subsequent visit to the University of Oxford, the President was briefed about research projects and collaborative partnerships with German universities.

== See also ==
- List of international presidential trips made by Frank-Walter Steinmeier
