= Urkuya Salieva =

Kyrgyz political activist

Urkuya Salieva (Kyrgyz: Уркуя Салиева, romanized: Urkuya Saliyeva; born 1910 in Murkut, in Nookat District, Osh oblast, Kyrgyzstan – 4 February 1934) was a political activist and communist organizer during the development of the Kirghiz Autonomous Socialist Soviet Republic. She has been described as one of the first Kyrgyz advocates of women's rights. She was assassinated in 1934.

== Biography ==
Salieva was born in 1910 into a Muslim peasant family. She became a secretary in the local Komsomol, the Soviet communist youth organization, at age 17 in 1927. She became a leader in the village council of her hometown Murkut in 1928. In 1931, she joined the Communist Party, served on the committee of a collective farm, and rose to be on the Central Executive Committee of the Kirghiz Autonomous Socialist Soviet Republic.

== Death ==
On February 4, 1934, Salieva and her husband were assassinated by anti-Soviet partisan forces (Basmachi movement), who opposed policies such as forced collectivization; though the movement had lost power elsewhere, it was still active in southern Kyrgyzstan into the early 1930s. Other sources have described the rationale for her killing as also due to her activism regarding women's equality. One of the collective farms she started was renamed in her honor.

== Cultural Impact ==
=== Honors ===
==== Monument ====
There is a monument to her in Bishkek on the Chui Avenue. Erected in 1978, the monument depicts Salieva in a flowing garment and wearing a headscarf, one hand held out to the side, the other holding a banner. A stamp of the monument was issued in 2011. There is some ambiguity about whether the monument was originally dedicated to Salieva, or meant to represent a more generic or symbolic revolutionary woman, but it is largely known today as a monument to or of Salieva.

The statue serves today as a starting point or endpoint for many feminist marches. Many of these marches are specifically against violence against women, which protestors have often faced while marching, most recently in 2020, when protestors, not the protestors’ attackers, were arrested and fined. Many protests are on March 8, International Women's Day, which is often celebrated in Kyrgyzstan by men giving women flowers or gifts. The monument also serves as a meeting point for educational activities and community events.

==== Museum ====
In 1980, a museum dedicated to Salieva opened in her hometown of Murkut, in the Osh oblast.

=== Film ===
In 1971 or 1972, the film Bow to the Fire (Poklonis Oglyu, Поклонись огню; sometimes translated as The Worship of Fire; sometimes also titled Urkuya) was made about her life, starring Tattybübü Tursunbayeva as Salieva. The film was directed by Tolomush Okeyev. It was released in the Soviet Union in 1972, Poland in 1973, and on Hungarian television in 1979.

=== Public perception ===
She has been praised as a role model for Kyrgyz girls and women, with Former President of the Kyrgyz Republic Roza Otunbayeva praising her decisive leadership in a time of social change. Her name is often invoked in speeches about women's rights or on International Women's Day. Salieva was included in a 2020 photography exhibition drawn from Kulbubu Bekturganova's book Kyrgyz Woman: History and Modernity.
