= Tolomush Okeyev =

- Төлөмүш Океев
- Born: 11 September 1935; Bökönbaev, Kirghiz ASSR, Soviet Union
- Died: 18 December 2001 (aged 66); Ankara, Turkey
- Occupations: Film director, screenwriter
- Years active: 1962–1995

Tölömüsh Okeyevich Okeyev (Kyrgyz: Төлөмүш Океевич Океев; 11 September 1935 – 18 December 2001) was a Kyrgyz screenwriter and film director born in Bökönbaev. In 1973, he was a member of the jury at the 8th Moscow International Film Festival. His 1975 film, The Red Apple, was entered into the 9th Moscow International Film Festival while his 1984 film, The Descendant of the Snow Leopard, was entered into the 35th Berlin International Film Festival, where it won the Silver Bear for an outstanding single achievement. In 1999, he was a member of the jury at the 21st Moscow International Film Festival.

== Filmography ==
=== Directed films ===
- Genghis Khan (1992)
- Miracle of Love (Сүйүүнүн Көркү, 1986)
- The Descendant of the Snow Leopard (Ак илбирсти тукуму, 1984)
- Skulptor Olga Manuylova (1982)
- Golden Autumn (Алтын Күз, 1980)
- Ulan (1977)
- The Red Apple (1975)
- The Ferocious One (1974)
- The Worship of Fire (1971-2; sometimes Bow Down to the Fire), a biography of Urkuya Salieva
- Smarter Birds (1970)
- The Heritage (1969)
- The Skies of Our Childhood (1966)
- There Are Horses (1965)

=== Written films ===
- Spotted Dog Running at the Edge of the Sea (1990)
