= Süymönkul Chokmorov =

Süymönkul Chokmorov Сүймөнкул Чокморов Chong-Tash
- Location within Kyrgyzstan
- Coordinates: 42°44′59″N 74°36′06″E
- Country: Kyrgyzstan
- Region: Chüy
- District: Alamüdün

Population (2021)
  - Total: 729

Süymönkul Chokmorov (Kyrgyz: Сүймөнкул Чокморов, before 2000: Kyrgyz: Чоң-Таш, romanized: Chong-Tash, Russian: Чон-Таш; English translation: "Big Rock") is a small village (kishlak) in Chüy Region, Kyrgyzstan, located just south of the capital Bishkek. It is part of the Alamüdün District. Its population was 729 in 2021. It is a ski resort and tourist area, and also the site of an NKVD execution. In 2000, it was renamed "Süymönkul Chokmorov" after the actor and artist Suimenkul Chokmorov.

The settlement was established in the 1930s when the local nomadic people were forced to settle.

== Natives of Chong-Tash ==
- Sopubek Begaliev, economist and politician.
- Suimenkul Chokmorov, actor and artist

== Memorial of Soviet repressions ==
In 1938, when Kyrgyzstan was part of the Soviet Union, Chong-Tash was the site of execution by the Soviet secret police, NKVD, as part of the Great Purge in the Soviet Union. 137 people – politicians, teachers, scientists and other professional and intellectuals from all over Kyrgyzstan – were secretly taken from the Bishkek (then Frunze) prison, shot to death, and their bodies dumped into a brick oven at a mountain NKVD location near the village. This was part of Joseph Stalin's crackdown of nationalist movements in Central Asia.

One of those killed was Törökul Aitmatov, father of the Kyrgyz author Chinghiz Aitmatov.

The site was discovered in 1991 after Kyrgyzstan gained its independence. The caretaker of the site had been sworn to secrecy by the NKVD (and, later, the KGB), but on his deathbed he told his daughter the location of the grave, who then told the Kyrgyz authorities. The bodies were then dug up and interred at a memorial site just outside the village called "Ata Beyit" ("Grave of our Fathers"). Former president Askar Akayev, other Kyrgyz dignitaries, and relatives of the dead participated in the reburial.
