= Murkut =

- Location within Kyrgyzstan
- Coordinates: 40°18′0″N 72°12′0″E
- Country: Kyrgyzstan
- Region: Osh Region
- District: Nookat District
- Elevation: 1,035 m (3,396 ft)

Population (2021)
  - Total: 3,803
- Time zone: UTC+6

Murkut is a village in Osh Region of Kyrgyzstan. It is part of the Nookat District. Its population was 3,803 in 2021.

It was the hometown of Kyrgyz women’s rights activist Urkuya Salieva, and is home to a museum dedicated to her.
