= Sopubek Begaliev =

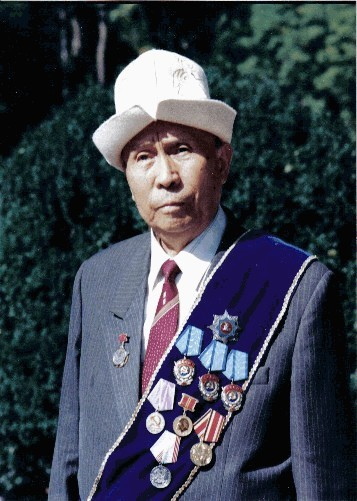
- Sopubek Begaliev with his medals (2000)
- Born: March 29, 1931; Chon Tash, Kyrgyz Soviet Socialist Republic, USSR
- Died: October 9, 2002 (aged 71); Bishkek, Kyrgyz Republic
- Occupation: Economist
- Awards: Order of Friendship; Order of the Red Banner of Labour (three medals); Medal for Distinguished Labor; Jubilee Medal "In Commemoration of the 100th Anniversary since the Birth of Vladimir Il'ich Lenin"; Jubilee Medal "Thirty Years of Victory in the Great Patriotic War 1941-1945"; Medal "Veteran of Labour"; Order of Manas

Sopubek Begaliev (Russian: Сопубек Бегалиевич Бегалиев) (March 29, 1931 – October 9, 2002) was a Soviet-era economist and politician. He was the founder of the Assembly of People of the Kyrgyz Republic, an organization that promotes inter-ethnic harmony, civil peace, and unanimity.

== Life and career ==
=== Soviet era ===
Sopubek Begaliev was born in the village of Chon Tash in Chuy Province, close to the Kyrgyz capital, Frunze. After his graduation from Moscow’s Plekhanov Russian Academy of Economics in 1954, Begaliev started his career as an economist in Gosplan, the central economic agency of the Soviet Union, and by 1960 he had risen to the rank of Deputy Chairman. In 1962, he became Minister of Local Economy and in 1963, due to a restructuring of the ministry, he became Minister of Municipal Economy. A year later he returned to Gosplan, where he was appointed First Deputy Chairman.

In 1968, Begaliev served as both Deputy Premier of the Kirghiz SSR and Chairman of Gosplan and would lead the agency on the economic development of the region for more than two decades. During his Soviet career, Begaliev was elected as a parliamentarian six times and was awarded the Order of the Red Banner of Labour three times. In 1979 he was awarded the title Honored Economist of the Kirghiz SSR.

=== Kyrgyz independence ===
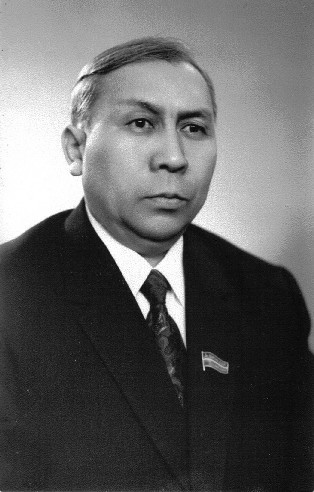
Sopubek Begaliev (1981)

In 1991, Begaliev was offered the position of Advisor on the Economic Issues of the Central Asian Republics to the President of the Soviet Union. However, this position was short-lived as the Soviet Union collapsed the same year and Kyrgyzstan became independent. From 1991-1994, he worked as an advisor to the Committee on Economic Issues of the Kyrgyz Republic.

In 1994, the first kurultay (congress) of all the ethnic groups in Kyrgyzstan elected Begaliev as Chairman of the Council of the Assembly of People of the Kyrgyz Republic. For the next eight years, he worked closely with Max Van der Stool, the OSCE High Commissioner on National Minorities and, after July 2001, with Van der Stool's successor, Rolf Ekeus.

In 1997, Begaliev was awarded the prestigious Order of Manas for a life devoted to public service, for his contribution to the promotion of inter-ethnic harmony and for furthering the development of the Assembly of People of the Kyrgyz Republic. In 2001, he was awarded the Order of Friendship by Russian president Vladimir Putin.
