= Ata-Beyit =

Memorial in Bishkek, Kyrgyzstan

Ata Beyit
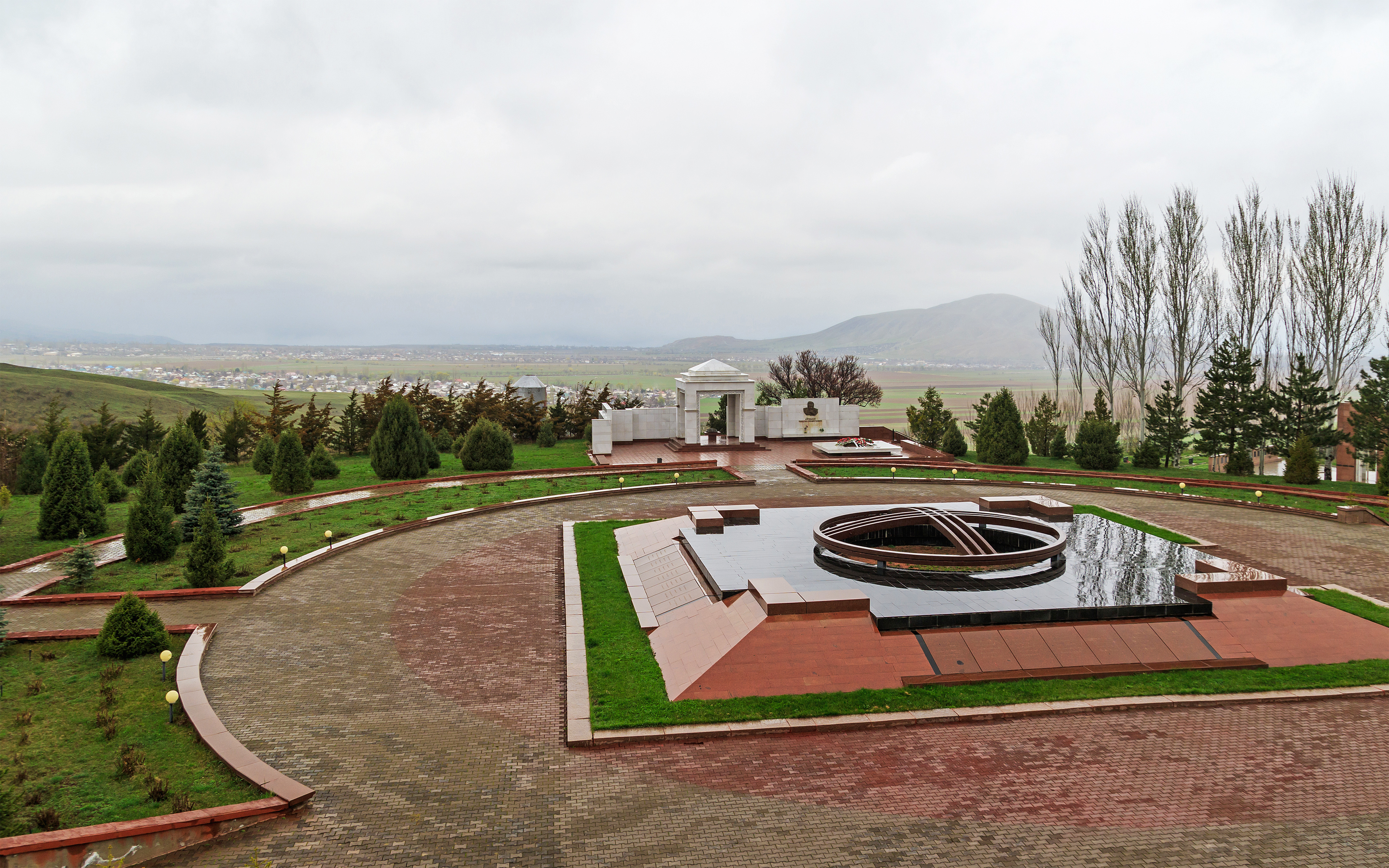
- The monument in March 2016.
- Interactive map of Ata Beyit
- Location: Chong-Tash, Alamüdün District, Chüy Region, Kyrgyzstan
- Created: 2000; 26 years ago
- Operator: City of Bishkek
- Status: All year

The Ata Beyit Memorial Complex (Russian: Мемориальный комплекс «Ата-Бейит») is a memorial site and cemetery near Bishkek, Kyrgyzstan. Located in Chong-Tash, Ata Beyit, meaning "Grave of our Fathers" in the Kyrgyz language, is currently the site of many notable burials.

== History ==
Located 30 kilometres from the capital, it was built in 2000 on the initiative of the first President of Kyrgyzstan, Askar Akayev in memory of the victims of the repressions in the village by Soviet authorities. When Kyrgyzstan was then known as the Kirghiz Soviet Socialist Republic in 1938, Chong-Tash was the site of executions carried out against Central Asian nationalist movements by the NKVD (secret police) during the Great Purge ordered by Joseph Stalin, the Soviet leader. The killings remained largely covered up by the Committee for State Security of the Kyrgyz SSR until the site was rediscovered in 1991 and its caretaker (who had been sworn to secrecy by the KGB) revealed the location of the grave to his daughter following the dissolution of the USSR. On 30 August 1991, a state sponsored mourning ceremony for the remains some of the victims was held. The following day, the independence and sovereignty of Kyrgyzstan was proclaimed.

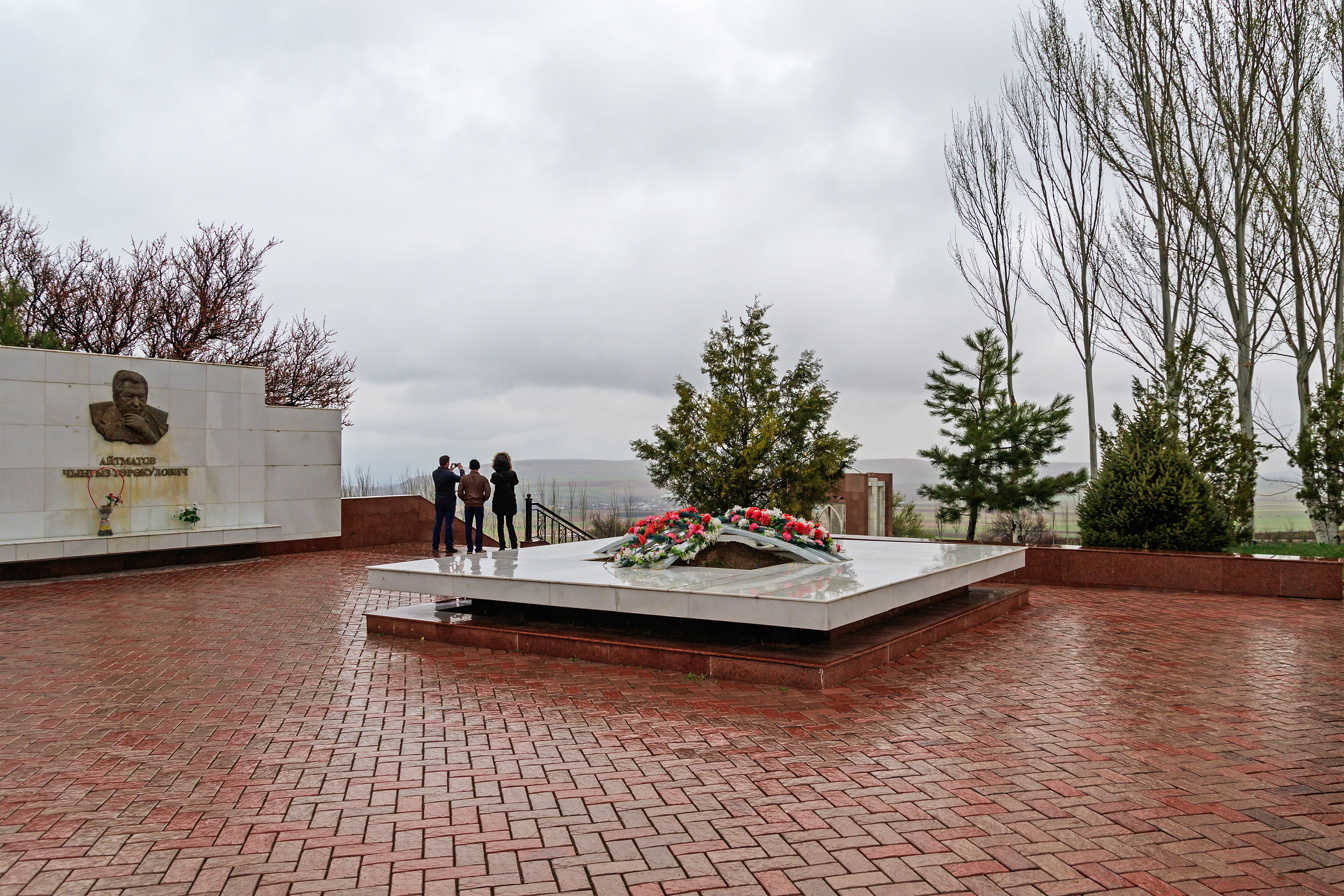
The Grave of Chinghiz Aitmatov.

The bodies were then dug up and collectively interred at Ata Beyit 9 years later in the presence of President Akayev, other Kyrgyz/foreign dignitaries, and relatives of the dead. On the right side of the museum is a memorial plaque which has the engraved names of all 137 victims. During the Days of History and Commemoration of Ancestors holiday on November 7–8, a procession to the memorial is held where the President of Kyrgyzstan lays a wreath to honour the victims. One of the more notable people buried at Ata Beyit, Kyrgyz and Soviet writer Chinghiz Aitmatov (buried in June 2008), was one of the founding organizers of the complex. He was buried alongside his father Törökul, who died circa 1938 in the Stalinist repressions. Victims of the Kyrgyz Revolution of 2010 were also buried here. In 2016, a monument to the 1916 Urkun was installed in the cemetery in a shape of a horizontal sculpture of a Tunduk ("Тундук") with a circular apex a traditional yurt.
