= Arraiolos Group =

EU informal meeting

The Arraiolos Group is an informal meeting of Presidents of parliamentary and semi-presidential European Union member states, held roughly once in a year. A political forum for the heads of state of parliamentary republics and also some semi-presidential republics (as opposed to constitutional monarchies or countries governed by a presidential system) whose role, according to the respective constitutions, may range from being significantly executive to largely ceremonial. It deals with questions and problems concerning the current state and future development of the EU as well as how to approach the challenges of globalisation.

The name is derived from the small Portuguese town of Arraiolos, where the first meeting took place in 2003. Jorge Sampaio, then the President of Portugal, had invited the presidents of Finland, Germany, as well as of soon-to-be EU members Hungary, Latvia and Poland to discuss the consequences of the 2004 enlargement of the European Union and plans for a Constitution for Europe.

Following the 2005 meeting, the seven participating presidents wrote a joint article titled "Together for Europe" about their conception of the European community. It was published on 15 July 2005 by Diena, Frankfurter Allgemeine Zeitung, Gazeta Wyborcza, Público, Helsingin Sanomat, la Repubblica and Der Standard, leading newspapers of the respective countries.

== Meetings ==
| # | Date | Location held | Host | Host figure | Attendees | Notes |
|---|---|---|---|---|---|---|
| 1 | 17–19 Oct 2003 | Arraiolos | Portugal | Jorge Sampaio | List: Finland (Tarja Halonen); Germany (Johannes Rau); Hungary (Ferenc Mádl); Latvia (Vaira Vīķe-Freiberga); Poland (Aleksander Kwaśniewski); Portugal (Jorge Sampaio) | |
| 2 | 22–24 Apr 2005 | Helsinki | Finland | Tarja Halonen | List: Austria (Heinz Fischer); Finland (Tarja Halonen); Germany (Horst Köhler); Latvia (Vaira Vīķe-Freiberga); Portugal (Jorge Sampaio) | |
| 3 | 4–5 Feb 2006 | Dresden | Germany | Horst Köhler | List: Austria (Heinz Fischer); Finland (Tarja Halonen); Germany (Horst Köhler); Hungary (Ferenc Gyurcsány, PM); Italy (Carlo Azeglio Ciampi); Latvia (Vaira Vīķe-Freiberga); Portugal (Jorge Sampaio) | |
| 4 | 10–11 Apr 2007 | Riga | Latvia | Vaira Vīķe-Freiberga | List: Austria (Heinz Fischer); Finland (Tarja Halonen); Germany (Horst Köhler); Hungary (László Sólyom); Italy (Giorgio Napolitano); Latvia (Vaira Vīķe-Freiberga); Poland (Lech Kaczyński); Portugal (Aníbal Cavaco Silva) | |
| 5 | 29–30 Apr 2008 | Graz | Austria | Heinz Fischer | List: Austria (Heinz Fischer); Finland (Tarja Halonen); Germany (Horst Köhler); Hungary (László Sólyom); Italy (Giorgio Napolitano); Latvia (Valdis Zatlers); Poland (Lech Kaczyński); Portugal (Aníbal Cavaco Silva) | |
| 6 | 12–13 Jun 2009 | Naples | Italy | Giorgio Napolitano | List: Austria (Heinz Fischer); Germany (Horst Köhler); Hungary (László Sólyom); Italy (Giorgio Napolitano); Portugal (Aníbal Cavaco Silva) | |
| 7 | 8–9 Apr 2011 | Budapest | Hungary | Pál Schmitt | List: Austria (Heinz Fischer); Finland (Tarja Halonen); Germany (Christian Wulff); Hungary (Pál Schmitt); Italy (Giorgio Napolitano); Latvia (Valdis Zatlers); Poland (Bronisław Komorowski); Portugal (Aníbal Cavaco Silva); Slovenia (Danilo Türk) | |
| 8 | 10–11 Feb 2012 | Helsinki | Finland | Tarja Halonen | List: Austria (Heinz Fischer); Finland (Tarja Halonen); Germany (Christian Wulff); Hungary (Pál Schmitt); Italy (Giorgio Napolitano); Latvia (Andris Bērziņš); Portugal (Aníbal Cavaco Silva); Slovenia (Danilo Türk) | |
| 9 | 8–9 Oct 2013 | Kraków | Poland | Bronisław Komorowski | List: Bulgaria (Rosen Plevneliev); Estonia (Toomas Hendrik Ilves); Finland (Sauli Niinistö); Germany (Joachim Gauck); Italy (Giorgio Napolitano); Latvia (Andris Bērziņš); Poland (Bronisław Komorowski); Portugal (Aníbal Cavaco Silva); Slovenia (Borut Pahor) | |
| 10 | 29–30 Sep 2014 | Braga | Portugal | Aníbal Cavaco Silva | List: Austria (Heinz Fischer); Bulgaria (Rosen Plevneliev); Estonia (Toomas Hendrik Ilves); Finland (Sauli Niinistö); Germany (Joachim Gauck); Hungary (János Áder); Latvia (Andris Bērziņš); Poland (Bronisław Komorowski); Portugal (Aníbal Cavaco Silva) | |
| 11 | 21–22 Sep 2015 | Wartburg and Erfurt | Germany | Joachim Gauck | List: Austria (Heinz Fischer); Bulgaria (Rosen Plevneliev); Estonia (Toomas Hendrik Ilves); Finland (Sauli Niinistö); Germany (Joachim Gauck); Italy (Sergio Mattarella); Latvia (Raimonds Vējonis); Malta (Marie Louise Coleiro Preca); Poland (Andrzej Duda); Portugal (Aníbal Cavaco Silva); Slovenia (Borut Pahor) | |
| 12 | 14–15 Sep 2016 | Plovdiv and Sofia | Bulgaria | Rosen Plevneliev | List: Bulgaria (Rosen Plevneliev); Finland (Sauli Niinistö); Germany (Joachim Gauck); Hungary (János Áder); Italy (Sergio Mattarella); Latvia (Raimonds Vējonis); Malta (Marie Louise Coleiro Preca); Poland (Andrzej Duda); Portugal (Marcelo Rebelo de Sousa); Slovenia (Borut Pahor) | |
| 13 | 14–15 Sep 2017 | Valletta and Rabat | Malta | Marie-Louise Coleiro Preca | List: Austria (Alexander Van der Bellen); Bulgaria (Rumen Radev); Croatia (Kolinda Grabar-Kitarović); Estonia (Kersti Kaljulaid); Germany (Frank-Walter Steinmeier); Greece (Prokopis Pavlopoulos); Hungary (János Áder); Italy (Sergio Mattarella); Latvia (Raimonds Vējonis); Malta (Marie Louise Coleiro Preca); Poland (Andrzej Duda); Portugal (Marcelo Rebelo de Sousa); Slovenia (Borut Pahor) | |
| 14 | 13–14 Sep 2018 | Rundāle and Riga | Latvia | Raimonds Vējonis | List: Austria (Alexander Van der Bellen); Bulgaria (Rumen Radev); Croatia (Kolinda Grabar-Kitarović); Estonia (Kersti Kaljulaid); Finland (Sauli Niinistö); Germany (Frank-Walter Steinmeier); Greece (Prokopis Pavlopoulos); Italy (Sergio Mattarella); Latvia (Raimonds Vējonis); Malta (Marie Louise Coleiro Preca); Poland (Andrzej Duda); Portugal (Marcelo Rebelo de Sousa); Slovenia (Borut Pahor) | |
| 15 | 10–11 Oct 2019 | Athens | Greece | Prokopis Pavlopoulos | List: Bulgaria (Rumen Radev); Croatia (Kolinda Grabar-Kitarović); Estonia (Kersti Kaljulaid); Germany (Frank-Walter Steinmeier); Greece (Prokopis Pavlopoulos); Hungary (János Áder); Ireland (Michael Higgins); Italy (Sergio Mattarella); Latvia (Egils Levits); Malta (George Vella); Poland (Andrzej Duda); Portugal (Marcelo Rebelo de Sousa); Slovenia (Borut Pahor) | |
| 16 | 15 Sep 2021 | Rome | Italy | Sergio Mattarella | List: Austria (Alexander Van der Bellen); Croatia (Zoran Milanović); Estonia (Kersti Kaljulaid); Finland (Sauli Niinistö); Germany (Frank-Walter Steinmeier); Greece (Katerina Sakellaropoulou); Hungary (János Áder); Ireland (Michael Higgins); Italy (Sergio Mattarella); Latvia (Egils Levits); Malta (George Vella); Poland (Andrzej Duda); Portugal (Marcelo Rebelo de Sousa); Slovenia (Borut Pahor) | |
| 17 | 6 Oct 2022 | Valletta | Malta | George Vella | List: Estonia (Alar Karis); Germany (Frank-Walter Steinmeier); Greece (Katerina Sakellaropoulou); Hungary (Katalin Novák); Ireland (Michael Higgins); Italy (Sergio Mattarella); Latvia (Egils Levits); Malta (George Vella); Poland (Andrzej Duda); Portugal (Marcelo Rebelo de Sousa); Slovakia (Zuzana Čaputová); Slovenia (Borut Pahor) | |
| 18 | 6 Oct 2023 | Porto | Portugal | Marcelo Rebelo de Sousa | List: Austria (Alexander Van der Bellen); Bulgaria (Rumen Radev); Croatia (Zoran Milanović); Estonia (Alar Karis); Finland (Sauli Niinistö); Germany (Frank-Walter Steinmeier); Greece (Katerina Sakellaropoulou); Hungary (Katalin Novák); Ireland (Michael D. Higgins); Italy (Sergio Mattarella); Latvia (Edgars Rinkēvičs); Malta (George Vella); Poland (Andrzej Duda); Portugal (Marcelo Rebelo de Sousa); Slovakia (Zuzana Čaputová); Slovenia (Nataša Pirc Musar) | |
| 19 | 11 Oct 2024 | Kraków | Poland | Andrzej Duda | List: Bulgaria (Rumen Radev); Croatia (Zoran Milanović); Estonia (Alar Karis); Germany (Frank-Walter Steinmeier); Greece (Katerina Sakellaropoulou); Hungary (Tamás Sulyok); Italy (Sergio Mattarella); Latvia (Edgars Rinkēvičs); Poland (Andrzej Duda); Slovakia (Peter Pellegrini); Slovenia (Nataša Pirc Musar) | |
| 20 | 9–10 Oct 2025 | Tallinn | Estonia | Alar Karis | List: Austria (Alexander Van der Bellen); Bulgaria (Rumen Radev); Estonia (Alar Karis); Germany (Frank-Walter Steinmeier); Greece (Konstantinos Tasoulas); Italy (Sergio Mattarella); Latvia (Edgars Rinkevics); Poland (Karol Nawrocki); Portugal (Marcelo Rebelo de Sousa); Slovakia (Peter Pellegrini); Slovenia (Nataša Pirc Musar) | |
| 21 | 15–16 Oct 2026 | Ljubljana | Slovenia | Nataša Pirc Musar | List: Austria; Estonia; Germany; Greece; Hungary; Ireland; Italy; Latvia; Malta; Portugal; Slovakia; Slovenia | |
