= Les Fourmis =

French novel series by Bernard Werber

Les Fourmis (The Ants) trilogy is a three-part novel series by French novelist Bernard Werber.

== The novels ==
- Les Fourmis, Prix des lecteurs de Science et Avenir, 1991, ISBN 2-226-05257-7. (lit. The Ants, translated into English as Empire of the Ants). This book sold more than two million copies and has been translated into more than 30 languages.
- Le Jour Des Fourmis, 1992, ISBN 2-226-06118-5 (lit. The Day of the Ants)
- La Révolution Des Fourmis, 1996, ISBN 2-226-08636-6 (lit. The Revolution of the Ants)

== See also ==
- Boris Vian, author of short story "Les Fourmis"
