= List of awards and nominations received by Ian Holm =

Ian Holm awards and nominations
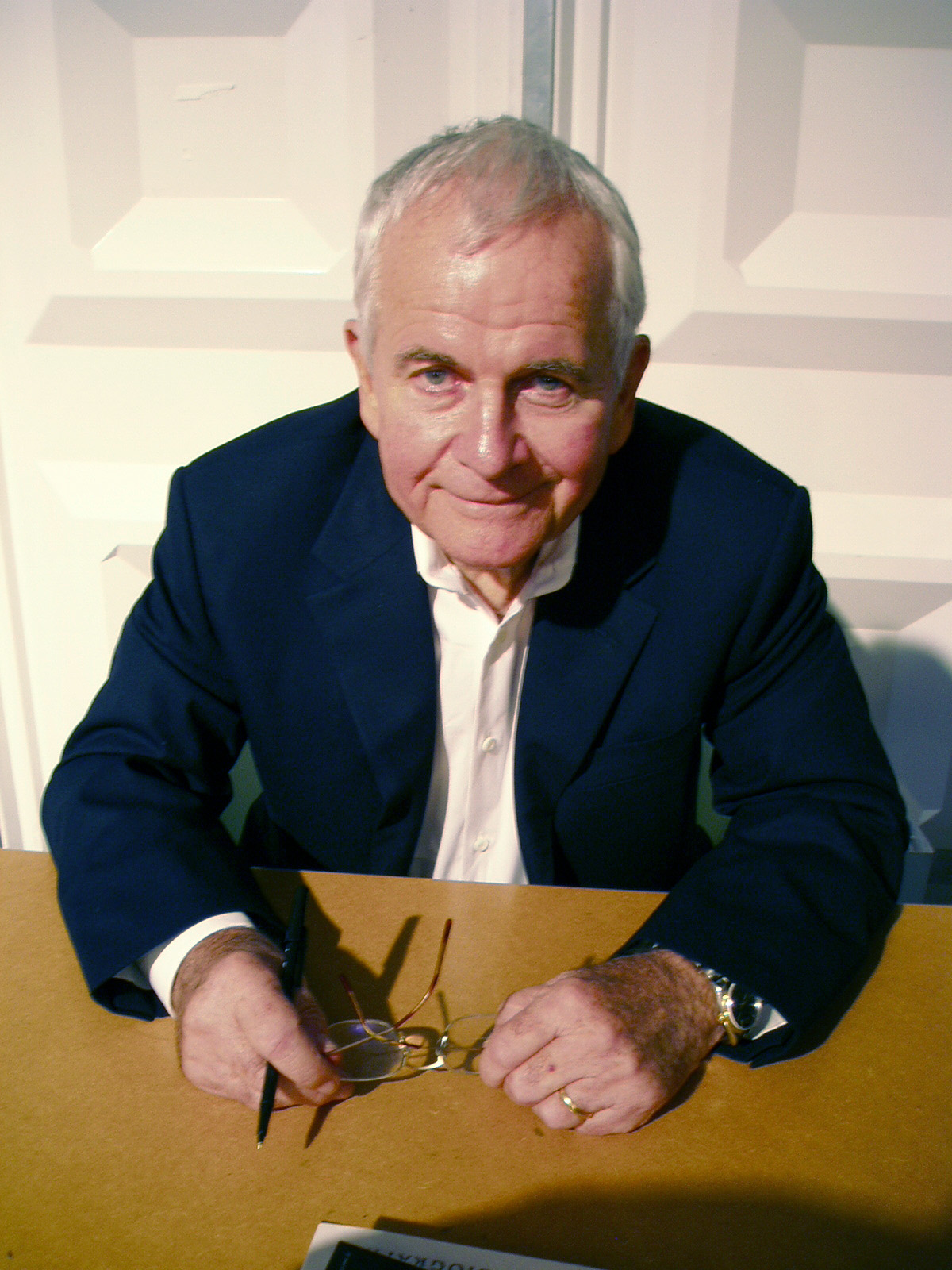
- Holm in August 2004
Award	Wins	Nominations
Academy Awards	0	1
BAFTA Awards	2	6
Emmy Awards	0	2
SAG Awards	1	3
Olivier Awards	1	1
Tony Awards	1	1
Total	5	14

Ian Holm was an acclaimed actor of the stage and screen.

He received numerous accolades including two BAFTA Awards and a Tony Award along with nominations for an Academy Award and two Emmy Awards. He was made a Commander of the Order of the British Empire (CBE) in 1989 by Queen Elizabeth II.

Holm won the 1967 Tony Award for Best Featured Actor for his performance as Lenny in the Harold Pinter play The Homecoming. He won the Laurence Olivier Award for Best Actor for his performance in the title role in the 1998 West End production of King Lear. For his television roles he received two Primetime Emmy Award nominations for King Lear (1998), and the HBO film The Last of the Blonde Bombshells (2003).

== Major associations ==
=== Academy Awards ===
Year	Category	Nominated work	Result	Ref.
1981	Best Supporting Actor	Chariots of Fire	Nominated	

=== BAFTA Awards ===
Year	Category	Nominated work	Result	Ref.
British Academy Film Awards
1968	Best Actor in a Supporting Role	The Bofors Gun	Won	
1981	Best Actor in a Supporting Role	Chariots of Fire	Won	
1984	Best Actor in a Supporting Role	Greystoke: The Legend of Tarzan, Lord of the Apes	Nominated	
1995	Best Actor in a Supporting Role	The Madness of King George	Nominated	
British Academy Television Awards
1978	Best Actor	The Lost Boys	Nominated	
1988	Best Actor	Game, Set and Match	Nominated	

=== Emmy Awards ===
Year	Category	Nominated work	Result	Ref.
Primetime Emmy Awards
1998	Outstanding Actor in a Miniseries or Movie	King Lear	Nominated	
2000	Outstanding Supporting Actor in a Miniseries or Movie	The Last of the Blonde Bombshells	Nominated	

=== Screen Actors Guild Awards ===
Year	Category	Nominated work	Result	Ref.
2001	Outstanding Cast in a Motion Picture	Lord of the Rings: The Fellowship of the Ring	Nominated	
2003	Outstanding Cast in a Motion Picture	Lord of the Rings: The Return of the King	Won	
2004	Outstanding Cast in a Motion Picture	The Aviator	Nominated	

=== Laurence Olivier Awards ===
Year	Category	Nominated work	Result	Ref.
1998	Best Actor	King Lear	Won	

=== Tony Awards ===
Year	Category	Nominated work	Result	Ref.
1967	Best Supporting or Featured Actor in a Play	The Homecoming	Won	

== Miscellaneous awards ==
Year	Award	Category	Nominated work	Result	Ref.
1965	Evening Standard Award	Best Actor	Henry V	Won	
1978	Royal Television Society Award	Best Performance	The Lost Boys	Won	
1981	Cannes Film Festival	Best Supporting Actor	Chariots of Fire	Won	
1985	Saturn Award	Best Supporting Actor	Dreamchild	Nominated	
1985	Boston Society of Film Critics	Best Supporting Actor	Dreamchild	Won	
1985	Boston Society of Film Critics	Best Supporting Actor	Wetherby	Won	
1985	National Society of Film Critics Award	Supporting Actor	Wetherby	3rd Place	
1985	Boston Society of Film Critics	Best Supporting Actor	Brazil	Won	
1985	National Society of Film Critics Award	Best Supporting Actor	Brazil	3rd place	
1985	Boston Society of Film Critics	Best Supporting Actor	Dance with a Stranger	Won	
1985	National Society of Film Critics Awards	Best Supporting Actor	Dance with a Stranger	3rd place	
1993	Critics' Circle Theatre Award	Best Actor	Moonlight	Won	
1993	Evening Standard Award	Best Actor	Moonlight	Won	
1997	Genie Award	Best Actor	The Sweet Hereafter	Won	
1997	Kansas City Film Critics Circle	Best Actor	The Sweet Hereafter	Won	
1997	National Board of Review	Best Cast	The Sweet Hereafter	Won	
1997	Toronto Film Critics Association	Best Actor	The Sweet Hereafter	Won	
1997	Chicago Film Critics Association	Best Actor	The Sweet Hereafter	Nominated	
1997	National Society of Film Critics Award	Best Actor	The Sweet Hereafter	3rd Place	
1997	New York Film Critics Circle	Best Actor	The Sweet Hereafter	2nd Place	
1998	Critics' Circle Theatre Award	Best Actor	King Lear	Won	
1998	Evening Standard Award	Best Actor	King Lear	Won	
2001	Phoenix Film Critics Society Award	Best Cast	The Lord of the Rings: The Fellowship of the Ring	Won	
2001	Las Vegas Film Critics Society Award	Best Supporting Actor	The Lord of the Rings: The Fellowship of the Ring	Nominated	
2003	Broadcast Film Critics Association	Best Cast	Lord of the Rings: The Return of the King	Won	
2003	National Board of Review	Best Cast	Lord of the Rings: The Return of the King	Won	
2003	Phoenix Film Critics Society	Best Cast	Lord of the Rings: The Return of the King	Nominated	
2007	Annie Award	Voice Acting in a Feature Production	Ratatouille	Won	
