= Der Prozess =

Der Prozess or Der Prozeß (German for "The Trial") may refer to:

- The Trial (German: Der Process and variants), a novel by Franz Kafka first published in 1925
- Der Prozeß (opera), of 1953 by Gottfried von Einem, based on the Kafka novel
- The Trial (1948 film) (German: Der Prozeß), a 1948 Austrian drama film

== See also ==
- Der Prozeß wird vertagt, an East German film released in 1958
- de:Prozess (Begriffsklärung), a disambiguation page in German Wikipedia with additional topics
