= Jean Kurt Forest =

German composer (1909–1975)

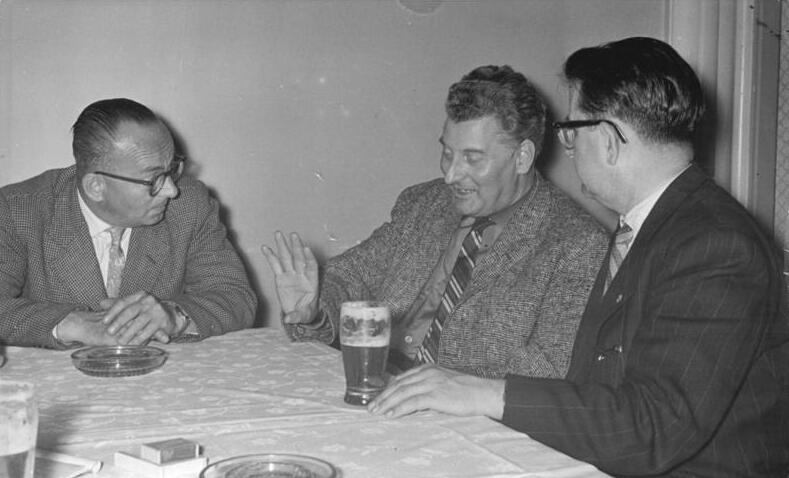
- Werner Renner, Jean Kurt Forest and Willi Hera, 7 June 1960
- Born: Jean Kurt Forst; 2 April 1909; Darmstadt, German Empire
- Died: 3 March 1975 (aged 65); East Berlin, East Germany
- Education: Spangenberg Conservatory
- Occupations: Violinist; Violist; Kapellmeister; Composer
- Organizations: Alhambra, Berlin; Rundfunksinfonieorchester Frankfurt; Philharmonisches Staatsorchester Hamburg; Staatstheater Braunschweig; Berliner Rundfunk; Deutscher Fernsehfunk; Akademie der Künste der DDR
- Awards: Art Prize of the German Democratic Republic; National Prize of the German Democratic Republic; Patriotic Order of Merit

Jean Kurt Forest (2 April 1909 – 3 March 1975) was a German violinist and violist, Kapellmeister and composer. He began his career as concertmaster in film orchestras conducted by Paul Dessau, then played principal viola in Frankfurt and Hamburg. Drafted to the Wehrmacht in 1942, he defected to the Red Army in 1945 and remained a prisoner of war until 1948. Back in East Berlin, he shaped musical life in the GDR in several positions, before he focused on composition from 1954, composing political songs and operas raising social awareness.

== Life ==
Born Jean Kurt Forst in Darmstadt, the son of a paperhanger, he learned to play the violin at the age of four. From age six, he received a thorough and varied musical education at the Spangenberg Conservatory in Wiesbaden, studying violin, voice, piano, trumpet, timpani and harmony until 1925. He mostly taught himself to play the viola and to compose.

He worked as concert master in Wiesbaden for the UFA film orchestra in 1926, and in the same position for the Alhambra cinema in Berlin from 1927 to 1930, collaborating in both locations with conductor Paul Dessau. From 1930 to 1933, he played principal viola for the Rundfunksinfonieorchester Frankfurt, and in the same role for the Philharmonisches Staatsorchester Hamburg and the Hamburg State Opera from 1934 to 1936. In 1937 he was arrested by the Nazis because of his anti-fascism attitude. Dismissed from all positions, he emigrated to Paris, but was expelled back to Germany in 1938. He worked as Kapellmeister at the Stadttheater Neiße, and from 1939 at the Staatstheater Braunschweig.

In 1942, Forest was drafted to the Wehrmacht, but in 1945 defected to the Red Army. As a prisoner of war until 1948, he attended an Antifa School and led its group Music and Artistics. When he returned to Germany, he settled in East Berlin and joined the Socialist Unity Party of Germany (SED). He participated in Berlin in various functions in the development of musical life in the German Democratic Republic (GDR), first as a consultant for choral music at the Berliner Rundfunk to 1951, and as Kapellmeister for Deutscher Fernsehfunk from 1952. He was a freelance composer from 1954.

In 1951, Forest was one of the founding members of the Verband der Komponisten und Musikwissenschaftler der DDR (VDK) and was Chairman of the Berlin District Association from 1967 to 1971. In 1970 he was admitted to the Akademie der Künste der DDR (DAK). From 1969 until his death, he directed the chamber ensemble Musica Nova.

He died in Berlin at age 65, and was buried at the Stahnsdorf South-Western Cemetery.

== Work ==
Forest composed around 250 songs, several of the genre Massenlied. His opera Der arme Konrad, written between 1955 and 1957 after a play by Friedrich Wolf, was followed in 1960 by the chamber opera Tai Yang erwacht, also after Wolf. In his stage works, Forest focused on historic topics, pointing at social conscience, such as fascism, war and the atomic bomb. In the 1960s, Forest was also active as a film score composer, for example in Credo: Martin Luther – Wittenberg 1517 and Wenn Du zu mir hältst.

=== Filmography ===
Forest wrote film scores for several films, including:

- 1958: Der Prozeß wird vertagt
- 1961: Allons enfants … pour l'Algérie
- 1962: Schlager der Woche (television film)
- 1962: Schaut auf diese Stadt
- 1964: Er filmte auf 5 Kontinenten
- 1964: Feierabend
- 1967: Credo: Martin Luther – Wittenberg 1517

=== Awards ===
Among Forest's awards were:

- 1956: Theodor Fontane Prize of Bezirk Potsdam
- 1959: Art Prize of the German Democratic Republic
- 1965: National Prize of the German Democratic Republic third class for art and literature
- 1965: Artur Becker Medal in Gold
- 1968: Art prize of the FDGB of the Free German Trade Union Federation
- 1969: Patriotic Order of Merit in Silver
