= Hesme =

Hesme is a surname. Notable people with the surname include:

- Annelise Hesme (born 1976), French actress
- Clotilde Hesme (born 1979), French actress
