= Pierre Arditi =

French actor (born 1944)

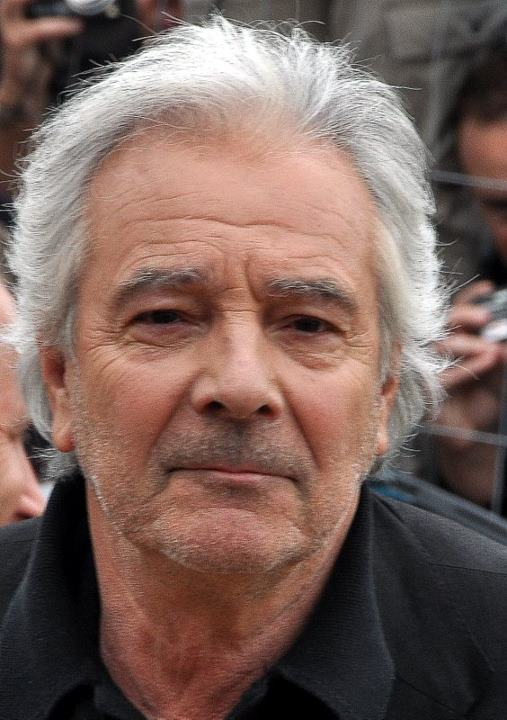
- Pierre Arditi in 2012
- Born: Pierre Marie Denis Arditi; 1 December 1944 (age 81); Paris, France
- Occupation: Actor
- Spouses: Florence Giorgetti (m. 1966; div. 1978) Évelyne Bouix (m. 2010)

Pierre Arditi (French pronunciation: [pjɛʁ aʁditi]; born 1 December 1944) is a French actor, whose career in film, stage, and television has spanned six decades. He is known for his collaboration with director Alain Resnais in nine films, including Mélo (1986) and Smoking/No Smoking (1993), both of which earned him a César Award. He also won a Molière Award in 1987.

== Life and career ==
Born in Paris, his father was the painter Georges Arditi, from Marseille of Jewish descent, and his mother Yvonne Leblicq was Belgian from Brussels.

In 1987 he won a César Award for Best Actor in a Supporting Role for his role in Mélo, and in 1994, a César Award for Best Actor for his role in Smoking/No Smoking.

Although his work has primarily been in French film and theater, Arditi is known in the Anglophone world as the French voice of Christopher Reeve. Arditi dubbed Christopher Reeve on the French-language version of the three first Superman films by Richard Donner and Richard Lester. Because of the added footage in the DVD Special Edition of Donner's Superman, the film had to be re-dubbed with a different voice actor. He also provided the French voice for Reeve in the comedy/whodunit Deathtrap. He was the voice of the documentary series Untamed Africa, written and produced by Frederic Lepage.

He was made Chevalier (Knight) of the Légion d'honneur in 2002. He was made Chevalier (Knight) of the Ordre national du Mérite on 7 April 1994, and promoted Officier (Officer) in 2005.

He is the brother of French actress Catherine Arditi.

== Filmography ==
Year	Title	Role	Director	Notes
1967	En votre âme et conscience	Antoine Jobard	Jean Bertho	TV series (1 Episode)
1968	L'homme du Picardie	Lucien	Jacques Ertaud	TV series
1969	Allô police	Alfredo	Adonis A. Kyrou	TV series (1 Episode)
1969	S.O.S. fréquence 17		Christian-Jaque	TV series (1 Episode)
1969	Thibaud	Ben Yacoub	Henri Colpi	TV series (1 Episode)
1969	Judith	Ephraïm	Robert Maurice	TV movie
1970	Reportage sur un squelette ou Masques et bergamasques	Arlequin	Michel Mitrani	TV movie
1970	L'illusion comique	Clindor	Robert Maurice	TV movie
1970	Last Leap		Édouard Luntz	
1970	Alyse et Chloé	The mage	René Gainville	
1970	Les dossiers du professeur Morgan			TV series (1 Episode)
1970	Madame Filoumé	Michel	Jeannette Hubert	TV movie
1970	Les aventures de Zadig		Claude-Jean Bonnardot	TV movie
1971	Face aux Lancaster	John	Adonis A. Kyrou	TV series
1971	Le bouton de rose	Jules	François Gir	TV movie
1972	Blaise Pascal	Blaise Pascal	Roberto Rossellini	TV movie
1972	Paix à ses cendres	Ivanito	Guy Lessertisseur	TV movie
1972	Albert Einstein	Academy of Olympia's member	Gérard Chouchan	TV movie
1973	Jeanne d'Arc	Evrard	Yves-André Hubert	TV movie
1973	Le noctambule	Snervalin	Philippe Arnal	TV movie
1973	L'étang de la Breure	Gilles	Claude Grinberg	TV series
1974	Eugène Sue	Ernest Legouvé	Jacques Nahum	TV movie
1974	Amoureuse Joséphine	Napoléon Bonaparte	Guy Lessertisseur	TV movie
1974	Les oiseaux de lune	Inspector Grindot	André Barsacq	TV movie
1974	Le pain noir		Serge Moati	TV Mini-Series
1974	Léo Burckart et les étudiants	Diego	Jeannette Hubert	TV movie
1974	Le funambule	Claude Billot	Serge Poljinsky	
1975	Les exilés	Robert	Guy Lessertisseur	TV movie
1977	Les Cinq Dernières Minutes	Serge Machery	Guy Lessertisseur	TV series (1 Episode)
1977	La lettre écarlate	Arthur Dimmesdale	Marcel Cravenne	TV movie
1977	L'inspecteur mène l'enquête			TV series (1 Episode)
1978	L'amour violé	Julien	Yannick Bellon	
1978	Cinéma 16	Quillan	Josée Dayan	TV series (1 Episode)
1978	Le petit théâtre d'Antenne 2		Guy Séligmann	TV series (1 Episode)
1979	Les dossiers de l'écran	Levavasseur	Maurice Frydland	TV series (1 Episode)
1980	My American Uncle	Zambeaux	Alain Resnais	
1980	Légitime défense	The friend	Claude Grinberg	TV movie
1980	Pile ou face	Pierre Larrieu	Robert Enrico	
1980	Les amours des années folles	Roland	Dominique Giuliani	TV series (1 Episode)
1980	Vernissage	Ferdinand	Edouard Logereau	TV movie
1980	Audience	Ferdinand	Edouard Logereau	TV movie
1981	Le serment d'Heidelberg	M. Noblecourt	André Farwagi	TV movie
1981	L'arme au bleu	The Sergeant	Maurice Frydland	TV movie
1981	Mon meilleur Noël	The psychiatrist	Jean-Pierre Marchand	TV series (1 Episode)
1981	Le rat noir d'amérique	Narrator	Jérôme Enrico	Short
1981–83	Au théâtre ce soir	Various	Pierre Sabbagh & Georges Folgoas	TV series (4 Episodes)
1982	Conrad Killian, le fou du désert	Chasseloup-Laubat	Jean-Paul Trébouet	TV series
1982	Malesherbes, avocat du roi	Desèze	Yves-André Hubert	TV movie
1982	Nestor Burma, détective de choc	Lecuyer	Jean-Luc Miesch	
1982	Les secrets de la princesse de Cadignan	Emile Blondet	Jacques Deray	TV movie
1982	Mozart		Marcel Bluwal	TV Mini-Series
1982	Les dossiers de l'écran	Verlet	Maurice Frydland	TV series (1 Episode)
1982	L'épingle noire	Damien	Maurice Frydland	TV Mini-Series
1983	Life Is a Bed of Roses	Robert Dufresne	Alain Resnais	
1983	Le secret de monsieur L	Patrick Gemet	Pierre Zucca	TV movie
1983	Jusqu'à la nuit	Renaud	Didier Martiny	
1984	Swann in Love	Charles Swann's voice	Volker Schlöndorff	
1984	Femmes de personne	Patric	Christopher Frank	
1984	Pauline ou l'écume de la mer	Éric Bentz	Patrick Bureau	TV movie
1984	L'Amour à mort	Simon Roche	Alain Resnais	
1985	The Children	The journalist	Marguerite Duras	
1985	Adieu Blaireau	La Grenouille	Bob Decout	
1985	L'homme de pouvoir	Pierre Cerf-Lebrun	Maurice Frydland	TV movie
1985	Strictement personnel	Jean Cottard	Pierre Jolivet	
1985	Une vie comme je veux	François	Jean-Jacques Goron	TV movie
1985	À coeur perdu		Patricia Valeix	Short
1986	Suivez mon regard	The publicist	Jean Curtelin	
1986	Mélo	Pierre Belcroix	Alain Resnais	César Award for Best Supporting Actor
1986	Un métier du seigneur	Arvers	Édouard Molinaro	TV movie
1986	State of Grace	Jean-Marc Vannier-Buchet	Jacques Rouffio	
1986	Triple sec		Yves Thomas	Short
1987	Monsieur Benjamin	Georges	Marie-Hélène Rebois	TV movie
1987	Tailleur pour dames	Doctor Moulineaux	Yannick Andréi	TV movie
1987	Poker	Duke	Catherine Corsini	
1987	La petite allumeuse	Armand	Danièle Dubroux	
1987	Agent trouble	Stanislas Gautier	Jean-Pierre Mocky	
1987	Flag	Commissioner Pierre Tramoni	Jacques Santi	
1987	Pattes de velours	Poltergeist	Nelly Kaplan	TV movie
1987	De guerre lasse	Jérôme	Robert Enrico	
1988	La passerelle	Jean Nevers	Jean-Claude Sussfeld	
1988	Natalia	Paul Langlade	Bernard Cohn	
1988	Bonjour l'angoisse	Jean-Hugues Aymeric	Pierre Tchernia	
1988	L'éloignement	Charles	Yves-André Hubert	TV movie
1989	Radio Corbeau	Inspector Julien Duval	Yves Boisset	
1989	Palace	Réclame	Jean-Michel Ribes	TV series (1 Episode)
1989	Condorcet	Marquis de Condorcet	Michel Soutter	TV Mini-Series
1989	Vanille fraise	Antoine Boulanger	Gérard Oury	
1989	Les grandes familles	Simon Lachaume	Édouard Molinaro	TV Mini-Series
1990	Duo	Michel	Claude Santelli	TV movie
1990	Le pont du silence	Narrator	Martine Bureau	Short
1991	Plaisir d'amour	Guillaume de Burlador	Nelly Kaplan	
1991	Les gens ne sont pas forcément ignobles	Eric	Bernard Murat	TV movie
1991	Largo desolato	Léopold	Agnieszka Holland	TV movie
1991	Les clés du paradis	Gaspard Cavaillac	Philippe de Broca	
1992	The Shadow	Lavigne	Claude Goretta	
1992	La grande collection	Mathieu	Mario Camus	TV series (1 Episode)
1993	The Little Apocalypse	Henri	Costa-Gavras	
1993	Ma petite Mimi	Geoffroy Lemaroyer	Roger Kahane	TV movie
1993	Smoking/No Smoking	Various	Alain Resnais	César Award for Best Actor; Flaiano Prize for Best Foreign Actor
1994	Le raisin d'or	Baron Jean de Malbray	Joël Séria	TV movie
1994	Couchettes express	Jack London's voice	Luc Béraud	TV movie
1995	Une femme dans mon coeur	Christian Delarive	Gérard Marx	TV movie
1995	L'affaire Dreyfus	Col. Esterhazy	Yves Boisset	TV movie
1995	The Horseman on the Roof	Monsieur Peyrolle	Jean-Paul Rappeneau	
1995–2000	Passeur d'enfants	Alex	Franck Apprederis	TV series (9 Episodes)
1996	Beaumarchais	Narrator	Édouard Molinaro	
1996	Unpredictable Nature of the River	Henri de Breuil	Bernard Giraudeau	
1996	Faisons un rêve	Him	Jean-Michel Ribes	TV movie
1996	La peau du chat	Georges	Jacques Otmezguine	TV movie
1996	Men, Women: A User's Manual	Lerner	Claude Lelouch	
1996	J'ai deux amours	Bertrand	Caroline Huppert	TV movie
1996	Le parfum de Jeannette	Charles	Jean-Daniel Verhaeghe	TV movie
1996	La passion du docteur Bergh	Bernard Letechin	Josée Dayan	TV movie
1997	Le prix de l'espoir	Pierre Manin	Josée Yanne	TV movie
1997	L'amour dans le désordre	Guillaume	Élisabeth Rappeneau	TV movie
1997	Messieurs les enfants	Joseph Piritzkt / Pope Piritzky	Pierre Boutron	
1997	Same Old Song	Claude Lalande	Alain Resnais	
1997	Quand le chat sourit		Sabine Azéma	TV movie
1997	L'enfant d'Israel		Franck Apprederis	TV movie
1997–2000	Un et un font six	Paul	Franck Apprederis & Jean-Pierre Vergne	TV series (8 Episodes)
1998	Week-end!	Julien	Arnaud Sélignac	TV movie
1998	Que la lumière soit	The invisible God	Arthur Joffé	
1998	Chance or Coincidence	Pierre Turi	Claude Lelouch	
1998	The Count of Monte Cristo	Villefort	Josée Dayan	TV Mini-Series
1998	Un amour de cousine	Pierre	Pierre Joassin	TV movie
1998	Art	Yvan	Yves-André Hubert	TV movie
1999	Un chat dans la gorge	Georges	Jacques Otmezguine	
1999	A Monkey's Tale	The King	Jean-François Laguionie	
1999	Les quatre-ving-unards		Marco Pico	TV Mini-Series
2000	False Servant	Trivelin	Benoît Jacquot	
2000	Les Acteurs	Himself	Bertrand Blier	
2000	Les enfants du printemps	Jean Charlet	Marco Pico	TV Mini-Series
2000	Le dernier plan	Ludovic	Benoît Peeters	
2000	On n'est pas là pour s'aimer	Maxime Vergnaud	Daniel Janneau	TV movie
2000	Chacun chez soi	Pierre	Élisabeth Rappeneau	TV movie
2001	Un couple modèle	Thomas	Charlotte Brandström	TV movie
2001	L'île bleue	Alexandre	Nadine Trintignant	TV movie
2001	Jalousie	Mathieu	Marco Pauly	TV movie
2001	Tout va bien c'est Noël!	Joachim	Laurent Dussaux	TV movie
2001–08	Sauveur Giordano	Sauveur Giordano	Various	TV series (16 Episodes)
2002	Patron sur mesure	Philippe Roussel	Stéphane Clavier	TV movie
2002	Une Ferrari pour deux	Vincent Saulnier	Charlotte Brandström	TV movie
2002	Le voeu	Narrator	David Alaux & Eric Tosti	Short
2003	The Mystery of the Yellow Room	Inspector Frédéric Larsan	Bruno Podalydès	
2003	Une villa pour deux	François	Charlotte Brandström	TV movie
2003	Not on the Lips	Georges Valandray	Alain Resnais	
2003	The Car Keys	Himself	Laurent Baffie	
2004	Du côté de chez Marcel	Himself	Dominique Ladoge	TV movie
2004	L'insaisissable	Maxime Kovacs	Élisabeth Rappeneau	TV movie
2004	Pourquoi (pas) le Brésil	The pediatrician	Laetitia Masson	
2004	Julie, chevalier de Maupin	Charles de Florensac	Charlotte Brandström	TV movie
2004	The First Time I Turned Twenty	Uncle Jérémy	Lorraine Lévy	
2004	Victoire	The father	Stéphanie Murat	
2005	L'un reste, l'autre part	Alain	Claude Berri	
2005	Le courage d'aimer	Pierre	Claude Lelouch	
2005	The Perfume of the Lady in Black	Frédéric Larsan	Bruno Podalydès	
2005	La séparation	Aristide Briand	François Hanss	TV movie
2006	Our Earthmen Friends	Narrator	Bernard Werber	
2006	Private Fears in Public Places	Lionel	Alain Resnais	
2006	Le grand appartement	Adrien	Pascal Thomas	
2006	Aller-retour dans la journée	François Villedieu-Lacour	Pierre Sisser	TV movie
2006	Coup de sang	Pierre Valois	Jean Marboeuf	
2007	Les liens du sang	Antoine Meyer	Régis Musset	TV movie
2007	Faisons un rêve	Him	Bernard Murat	TV movie
2008	Mitterrand à Vichy	Narrator	Serge Moati	TV movie
2008	The Great Alibi	Senator Henri Pages	Pascal Bonitzer	
2008	Tailleur pour dames	Moulineaux	Bernard Murat	TV movie
2008	Tu peux garder un secret?	Pierre Grimaux	Alexandre Arcady	
2008	Musée haut, musée bas	Henri Province	Jean-Michel Ribes	
2009	Change of Plans	Henri	Danièle Thompson	
2009	L'éloignement	Charles	Emmanuel Murat	TV movie
2009	Je vais te manquer	Marcel Hanri	Amanda Sthers	
2009	Park Benches	M. Borelly	Bruno Podalydès	
2009	Bambou	Reynald Van Nuyten	Didier Bourdon	
2009	Au siècle de Maupassant	Méchinet	Claude Chabrol	TV series (1 Episode)
2010	Sentiments provisoires	Marc		TV movie
2010	Ensemble, c'est trop	Henri	Léa Fazer	
2010	Le grand restaurant	A client	Gérard Pullicino	TV movie
2010	Les fausses confidences	Dubois	Don Kent	TV movie
2010	Je ne vous oublierai jamais	Armand de La Frémerie	Pascal Kané	
2010	Roses à crédit	Monsieur Georges	Amos Gitai	
2010	Les méchantes	Claude	Philippe Monnier	TV movie
2010	Vivace	Gilles Vasseur	Pierre Boutron	TV movie
2010	Streamfield, les carnets noirs	The first	Jean-Luc Miesch	
2011	La vérité	Michel	Vitold Krysinsky	TV movie
2011–2017	Le sang de la vigne	Benjamin Lebel	Various	TV series (22 Episodes)
2012	La danse de l'albatros	Thierry	Nathan Miller	TV movie
2012	Granny's Funeral	Armand's father	Bruno Podalydès	
2012	You Ain't Seen Nothin' Yet	Orphée	Alain Resnais	
2012	La fleur de l'âge	Gaspard Dassonville	Nick Quinn	
2014	Coup de coeur	Jean-Pierre Berthelot	Dominique Ladoge	TV movie
2015	The Sweet Escape	The fisherman	Bruno Podalydès	
2017	Capitaine Marleau	Gilles Garin	Josée Dayan	TV series (1 Episode)
2018	The Summer House	Jean	Valeria Bruni Tedeschi	
2019	La Belle Époque		Nicolas Bedos	
2021	The Accusation	Jean Farel	Yvan Attal	
