= Le Père de nos pères =

1998 novel by Bernard Werber

The Father of our Fathers
- Author: Bernard Werber
- Original title: Le Père de nos pères
- Language: French. Currently unpublished in English/American languages
- Published: 1998 (Albin Michel) (France)
- Publication place: France
- Media type: Print (Hardcover)

Le Père de nos pères is a novel, by Bernard Werber, released in 1998. It is the first volume in the trilogy of Lucrèce et Isidore, named for the two main characters.

In this book, Werber deals with the origins of humankind through two new characters, Isidore Katzenberg and Lucrèce Nemrod. He puts forward an alternative and surprising idea for the transitional fossil in the evolution of humanity, also called the Missing Link theory.

== Summary ==
The plot takes place mainly in the present, when Professor Adjemian, a palaeontogist, is murdered. Before he died, Adjemian claimed to know the answer to the fundamental question: “Where do we come from?” Lucrèce Nemrod, a young reporter, covers this case and decides to find out why the professor was murdered after the police close the case. For her article, Lucrèce asks Isidore Katzenberg, a former scientific journalist, for help. Isodore and Lucrèce leave for Africa in order to uncover a secret for which some people are ready to kill.

Simultaneously, a second plot, becomes entwined with the investigation. This second story takes place "somewhere in East Africa", 3.7 million years ago. It deals with the life of a cave man known simply as "He".

The suspense is very intense until it reaches the last word of the book which reveals the identity of the Missing Link. The literary genres of crime fiction, scientific journalism, adventure, biography, philosophical fiction and others are intermingled in Bernard Werber's typical style.

== Editions ==
- Albin Michel, 1998 (ISBN 978-2253148470)
- LGF, collection Le Livre de Poche, 2000 (ISBN 2253148474)
