= 1985 National Society of Film Critics Awards =

Annual US film awards ceremony

20th NSFC Awards

January 3, 1986

Best Film:
Ran

The 20th National Society of Film Critics Awards, given on 3 January 1986, honored the best filmmaking of 1985.

== Winners ==
=== Best Picture ===
1. Ran
2. Prizzi's Honor
2. The Purple Rose of Cairo

=== Best Director ===
1. John Huston – Prizzi's Honor
2. Akira Kurosawa – Ran

=== Best Actor ===
1. Jack Nicholson – Prizzi's Honor
2. William Hurt – Kiss of the Spider Woman

=== Best Actress ===
1. Vanessa Redgrave – Wetherby
2. Jessica Lange – Sweet Dreams
3. Norma Aleandro – The Official Story (La historia oficial)

=== Best Supporting Actor ===
1. John Gielgud – Plenty and The Shooting Party
2. William Hickey – Prizzi's Honor
3. Ian Holm – Wetherby, Brazil and Dance with a Stranger
4. Klaus Maria Brandauer – Out of Africa

=== Best Supporting Actress ===
1. Anjelica Huston – Prizzi's Honor
2. Mieko Harada – Ran

=== Best Screenplay ===
1. Albert Brooks and Monica Johnson – Lost in America
2. Woody Allen – The Purple Rose of Cairo
3. Terry Gilliam, Tom Stoppard and Charles McKeown – Brazil
3. Richard Condon and Janet Roach – Prizzi's Honor

=== Best Cinematography ===
1. Takao Saito, Masaharu Ueda and Asakazu Nakai – Ran
2. Kiyoshi Hasegawa – The Makioka Sisters (Sasame-yuki)
3. Michael Ballhaus – After Hours

=== Best Documentary ===
1. Shoah
2. 28 Up
3. Streetwise
