= Band of Thieves =

Band of Thieves may refer to:

- Band of Thieves (1928 film), a German silent film
- Band of Thieves (1962 film), a British musical film

== See also ==
- Sly 2: Band of Thieves, a platform stealth video game
