= Hugh Brody =

British anthropologist, writer, director and lecturer

Hugh Brody (born 1943) is a British anthropologist, writer, director and lecturer.

== Education ==
In the 1950s he worked as an accountant in Sheffield before passing the entrance examinations for the University of Oxford. He studied at Trinity College, Oxford.

== Career ==
Brody taught social philosophy at Queen's University Belfast. He is an Honorary Associate of the Scott Polar Research Institute at the University of Cambridge, and an Associate of the School for Comparative Literature at the University of Toronto. He held the Canada Research Chair at University of the Fraser Valley in Abbotsford, British Columbia from 2004 to 2018. He is Honorary Professor of Anthropology at the University of Kent, Canterbury.

== Anthropologist ==
In the 1960s, as a graduate student at Oxford, Brody was influenced by Muiris Ó Súilleabháin's book Fiche Blian ag Fás (Twenty Years a-Growing), and worked as an anthropologist in Ireland. This led to his book Inishkillane, Change And Decline in the West of Ireland. The field-work for this study took him to Connemara and West Cork, where he lived and worked with peasant farmers, fishermen and as a barman in a village bar. Contracted by Raidió Teilifís Éireann he spent time on Gola Island, off the coast of County Donegal, research that led to his contribution to the book Gola, The Life and Last Days of an Island Community, co-authored with F. H. A. Aalen.

In 1969, he did his first Canadian work, supported by the Northern Science Research Group at what was then the Canadian Department of Indian and Northern Affairs. This took him to the skid row area of Edmonton, Alberta in the Canadian Prairies. His report on that work, Indians on Skid Row, published in 1970, led to changes in government policy, especially in relation to Native Friendship Centres – crucial in giving support to Native people adrift in Canadian cities.

In the 1970s, as a research officer with the Northern Science Research Group, he did extensive field work in the Arctic, living with Inuit in the communities of Pond Inlet on Baffin Island and Sanikiluaq on the Belcher Islands. He learned two dialects of Inuktitut, North Baffin and South Hudson Bay, and wrote The People's Land, Inuit and Whites in the Eastern Arctic. This is a book that looks at how colonial relations, through the history of the fur trade, church missions and the Canadian government, have shaped the social and psychological circumstances of the far north. The argument and descriptions focus very much on a particular time in a particular place, but resonate with parallel experiences among indigenous peoples around the world. In the course of his work with the Northern Science Research Group, Brody also developed an innovative program that aimed to give new levels of support for families who wanted to live on the land. Brody was also one of those who in the mid-1970s first urged within the Department of Indian and Northern Affairs the idea of the separation of the Canadian north into two indigenous jurisdictions, with that of the east becoming an Inuit political territory. This came into being with the creation of Nunavut in 1999.

In 1975, Brody resigned from his position in the Canadian Civil Service. He was then based at the Scott Polar Research Institute at the University of Cambridge, where he became an Honorary Associate. In 1976–1978 he worked on the Inuit Land Use and Occupancy Project, in the Northwest Territories, where he was co-ordinator for the land use mapping carried out in the North Baffin region. He also assembled an Arctic-wide account of Inuit perceptions of land occupancy, building a collage of Inuit voices from all the communities of the Northwest Territories. He later worked on a similar project with Inuit and settlers of Labrador, which was published in Our Footsteps Are Everywhere (1978).

In 1977, Brody was a witness to the Mackenzie Valley Pipeline Inquiry, giving evidence on the nature of northern development, alcohol abuse and Inuit languages. He then became a member of Justice Thomas R. Berger's staff, helping to prepare the two volume report that set out the remarkable conclusions of the inquiry.

In the 1980s, working for the Union of British Columbia Indian Chiefs, Brody lived and worked with the Dunne-za and Cree of northeast British Columbia – the project and experiences that led to his book Maps And Dreams. This account of anthropological research and cultural mapping with a hunting community, and especially the laying of frontier development onto the ways Dunne-za and Cree see and understand their territories, became a classic of indigenous studies. Its use of alternating chapters, switching between first person narrative and social scientific writing has also given it a significant place in the history of the literature of anthropology.

Brody worked with Justice Berger again in 1991–1992 as a member of the World Bank's Morse Commission, which had the job of assessing implications of the Sardar Sarovar Dam, a vast hydro and irrigation project in western India. His role in public inquiries and assessment of the impact of large scale developments on indigenous communities continued when he became Chairman of the Snake River Independent Review. This was a mediation between the Idaho Power Company and the Nez Perce Tribe of Idaho in relation to the building of the hydro dams on the Snake River in the 1950s.

Since 1997, Brody has worked on projects in southern Africa. This began when he helped co-ordinate background research for the ‡Khomani San Land Claim in South Africa's southern Kalahari. This work led to filming many aspects of the claim, including its aftermath. In 2008, accompanied by the Canadian cinematographer Kirk Tougas, he filmed the beneficiaries of the claim as they reflected upon how it had changed their lives in the nine years since the claim was accepted. Working with the UK NGO Open Channels, and funded by the UK charity Comic Relief, Brody also led projects with and for San in Namibia and Botswana. The film work in South Africa led to the DVD Tracks Across Sand – four and a half hours of film edited by long-term collaborator Haida Paul shot in the course of land claims research, oral history and language research in the northern Cape of South Africa.

== Writer ==
As a writer, Brody has published many essays and a collection of short stories, as well as his non-fiction books. His collection of stories, Means of Escape, was praised by Doris Lessing: "I recommend these tales to all connoisseurs of the short story, for they are unique in flavour and style, altogether unusual, and will stay in my memory like elegiac and lyrical songs or poems. Beautiful." The Canadian writer M. T. Kelly described the collection as "Intense, deeply felt, charged fiction...A masterful accomplishment". Brody has also written a number of screenplays, one of which, co-authored with Michael Ignatieff, became the film Nineteen Nineteen.

Canadian philosopher George Woodcock described Maps and Dreams (1981) as "an impressive attempt to dispel popular errors about peoples whom anthropologists used condescendingly to call 'primitive hunters'. Brody is also seeking to prove that hunting economies can continue to be viable even in modern North America, and that the way of life associated with them is worth preserving."

In 2000, Brody published The Other Side of Eden: Hunter-Gatherers, Farmers and the Shaping of the World. This is a book that puts together experience of and thinking about many of the fields of travel and anthropology that have been at the centre of Brody's work. It looks at the relationship between culture and language, the way the agricultural way of life is at the core of the mythic ideas of human universality to be found in Genesis, and the way hunting cultures have been wrongly identified as nomadic – pointing out that it is agriculture, with its inherent tendency to produce surplus population and propensity for colonial expansion and warfare, that is the most mobile of ways of life. The Other Side of Eden takes a very wide view of history and cultures, yet is rooted in closely observed anthropology, much of it from Brody's own field experience. A review in the New York Times termed it " an informed, passionate and enlightening volume…that adds new dimensions to our understanding of the diversity of human life.” Stephen Osborne writing in Geist described it as "a literary act: a work of deep imagination. It shows us the way into the heart of North America, a place that has barely been glimpsed by our leaders, our intellectuals, ourselves.”

Brody also wrote an article in 2020, ‘Beginning with Ireland’, in which he revisits his work in the West of Ireland, going back to both personal and methodological narratives, and seeing the roads that led from villages in rural Ireland to communities in the high Arctic and the Kalahari.

== Filmmaker ==
In 1975, Brody's filmmaking began with his work for ITV's series Disappearing World, going with director Michael Grigsby to the Inuit community of Pond Inlet, where they made the film The People's Land, Eskimos of Pond Inlet. This led to Brody directing documentaries, first in Canada (working with First Nations in many parts of the country), as well as in the UK and Australia. These include the award-winning Hunters And Bombers, a film that follows the Innu resistance to low level flying in Labrador from CFB Goose Bay. He also made On Indian Land, a film with the Gitksan and Wet'suwet'en of northern British Columbia, and Time Immemorial, the opening film in the series As Long As The Rivers Flow.

His film The Washing of Tears made with the Mowachaht-Muchalaht people of Gold River, on the west coast of Vancouver Island, is an exploration of how one community looked to their fractured heritage to deal with extremes of dispossession and grief.

Hugh Brody and Michael Ignatieff's screenplay 1919 was filmed in 1983 and released in 1984. It explores history, memory and the place of psycho-analysis in an understanding of both the self and the 20th century. John Berger, in his introduction to the Faber and Faber edition of the screenplay, wrote: "Nineteen Nineteen speaks directly to what we know about life, composed inextricably of the most intimate movements of the heart, accident, and the remorseless movement of history." Philip French, reviewing the film for London's Observer observed: "With Nineteen Nineteen, cinema's relationship to psychoanalysis has come of age. This is the first great film about the subject." The film's cast included Paul Scofield, Maria Schell, Diana Quick, Clare Higgins and the young Colin Firth.

Brody's films for British television include England's Henry Moore, a project that was conceived by writer and political commentator Anthony Barnett. It explores Barnett's exposition of the links between Moore's work and the place of Britain in the world. In 2002–2003 Brody made Inside Australia, a journey with Antony Gormley into the Australian western desert to follow the installation of one of Gormley's most notable pieces of work.

In 2005–2008, Brody made a film in a prison in British Columbia, The Meaning of Life, in which he explores the use of aboriginal culture as a means of rehabilitation. At the centre of this film are accounts that inmates give of their lives and attempts at rehabilitation. In 2012, he finished work on a 4-hour DVD, Tracks Across Sand, which shows in 17 segments the results of filming with the ‡Khomani San as they develop and then cope with their 1999 land claim.

In 2014, a large collection of materials gathered from the projects with the ‡Khomani San was deposited with the University of Cape Town Libraries and can be viewed on the digital collections website.

In 2017-18 he worked with his son Tomo Brody on a set of films shot by Tomo in the Jungle refugee camp in Calais including Human After All: Voices from Calais In 2018-19 he worked with Tomo Brody on Crimes Against Children, a film about the impacts of boarding schools on Adivasi/Tribal children in India.

== Personal life ==
Brody is married to the actress Juliet Stevenson; they have two children. He also had two sons with his former partner, the dancer Miranda Tufnell.

== BBC interview ==
In 2023 Brody was the guest on BBC Radio 3's Private Passions.

== Works ==
=== Filmography ===
- The People's Land: Eskimos of Pond Inlet – ITV: Granada, London, 1976 (research, collaboration with Mike Grigsby) 55 minutes.
- A Conemara Family – BBC: Bristol / London, 1980 (research, collaboration with Melissal Llewelyn-Davis) 58 minutes.
- Treaty 8 Country – Treaty 8 bands / National Film Board of Canada (NFB) Vancouver, 1981 (director, collaboration with Anne Cubitt) 44 minutes.
- People of the Islands – Channel 4: London, 1982 (director) 80 minutes.
- 1919 – British Film Institute: London 1985 (co-writer, director). 90 minutes.
- On Indian Land – GWTC: Hazelton, British Columbia / Channel 4: London, 1986 (co-producer, director) 54 minutes.
- England's Henry Moore – Channel 4: London, 1988 (director) 65 minutes.
- Hunters and Bombers – NFB: Montreal / Channel 4: London, 1990 (co-director) 56 minutes.
- Time Immemorial – Tamarack: Toronto / NFB: Montreal, 1991 (director) 61 minutes.
- A Washing of Tears – Nootka Sound & Picture Co./NFB: 1993 (director)
- Cosmic Africa – directed by Craig Foster, Aland Pictures, Cosmos Films, IDC South Africa, 2002 (co-writer)
- Inside Australia – Artemis Films International: 2004
- The Meaning of Life – HR Brody Ltd: 2008
- Tracks Across Sand – 2012 (director), a DVD containing sixteen films (total 4.5 hours) made as a community project with the ‡Khomani San of the Southern Kalahari.

=== Books ===
- Gola: Life and Last Days of an Island Community (with F.H.A. Aalen). Cork: Mercier, 1969.
- Indians on Skid Row. Ottawa: NSRG, 1971.
- Inishkillane: Change and Decline in the West of Ireland. London: Allen Lane, 1973, Penguin, 1974, Norman & Hobhouse, 1981, Faber & Faber, 1986; New York: Schocken, 1975; Vancouver: Douglas & McIntyre, 1981.
- The People's Land. London and Toronto: Penguin, 1975, 1977, 1983; New York: Penguin, 1977; Vancouver: Douglas & McIntyre, 1991 (with new introduction).
- Maps and Dreams. Vancouver: Douglas & McIntyre. 1981, 1988 (with new introduction); London: Norman & Hobhouse, 1981, Faber & Faber, 1986. London and Toronto: Penguin, 1983; New York: Pantheon, 1983. (Reissued Long Grove, IL: Waveland Press, 1998)
- Nineteen Nineteen (with Michael Ignatieff). London: Faber & Faber, 1985.
- Living Arctic. London: Faber & Faber, 1987; Vancouver: Douglas & McIntyre, 1990.
- Means of Escape. Vancouver: Douglas & McIntyre, 1991; London: Faber & Faber, 1991.
- The Other Side of Eden: Hunters, Farmers and the Shaping of the World. Vancouver: Douglas & McIntyre / London: Faber and Faber / New York: Farrar, Straus & Giroux, 2000. Paperback: Canada, 2001, UK and USA, 2002. Dutch, Chinese and Japanese translations, 2002-3
- Landscapes of Silence: from Childhood to the Arctic. London, Toronto and New York: Faber and Faber, 2022.

=== Essays ===
- Inuit Land Use and Occupancy and Inummarit, The Real People
- Industrial Impact in the Canadian North
- Eskimo: A Language With a Future?
- Continuity and Change: The Inuit and Settlers of Labrador
- Alcohol – Études Inuit
- Jim's Journey
- On Indian Land:The Gitksan-Wet'suwet'en
- Introduction to Stikine, The Great River,
- The Power of the Image – in Imaging the Arctic
- Nomads And Settlers
- Taking the Words from their Mouths
- Introduction to Seasons of the Arctic photographs by Paul Nicklen,
- In conversation with Hugh Brody, interview by Eleanor Wachtel,
- Atanarjuat – the fast runner, a discussion of Zacharias Kunuk's film
- Inside Lake Ballard – in Antony Gormley's Inside Australia
- Foreword to Robert Semeniuk's Among the Inuit
- Without Stories We Are Lost – in The Journals of Knud Rasmussen
- Stations of Life, an essay about inequality
- The anthropology of ourselves – in Anthony Gormley's One And Other: The Fourth Plinth in Trafalgar Square
- Gaddafi and the Tuareg
- 1 December 1961: Fly the Flag of Independence
- Guest editorial for Irish Journal of Anthropology. ‘Permanence and Transition – Anthropological Perspectives
- Foreword to Woodsmoke and Leafcups, Autobiographical footnotes to the anthropology of the Durwa by the Indian botanical anthropologist Madhu Ramnath.
- With Peter Usher, Obituary of the late Jim Lotz Arctic, Arctic Institute of North America
- 'Messages’, in Antony Gormley: Field for the British Isles
- 'A Story of Arctic Maps’, in Groundwork: Writings on Places and People,
- 'The People’s Land—The Film’ an essay in: The Hands' Measure: Essays Honouring Leah Aksaajuq Otak's Contribution to Arctic Science
- ‘What were we mapping? From the Inuit Land Use and Occupancy Project to the Southern Kalahari’. In: Mapping the Unmappable? Cartographic Explorations with Indigenous Peoples in Africa

== Nominations, awards, and honours ==
- 1991: Catholic Film Critics Award winner for Hunters and Bombers
- 1985: Golden Bear award nomination at the 35th Berlin International Film Festival for 1919
