= The Children (1985 film) =

1984 film

- Directed by: Marguerite Duras; Jean Mascolo; Jean-Marc Turine
- Written by: Marguerite Duras
- Produced by: Robert Pansard-Besson; Frederic Vieille
- Starring: Axel Bogousslavsky
- Cinematography: Bruno Nuytten
- Edited by: Françoise Belleville
- Music by: Carlos d'Alessio
- Release date: 1985
- Running time: 94 minutes
- Country: France
- Language: French

The Children (French: Les Enfants) is a French comedy film directed by Marguerite Duras. It was entered into the 35th Berlin International Film Festival where it won an Honourable Mention.

== Cast ==
- Axel Bogousslavsky as Ernesto
- Daniel Gélin as Enrico
- Tatiana Moukhine as Natasha
- Martine Chevallier as Nicole (as Martine Chevalier)
- André Dussollier as Le directeur d'école
- Pierre Arditi as Le journaliste
