= Rainer Simon =

German film director

- Born: 11 January 1941 (age 85); Hainichen, Saxony, Germany
- Occupations: Film director, screenwriter
- Years active: 1964-2000

Rainer Simon (born 11 January 1941) is a German film director and screenwriter. He directed 17 films between 1964 and 2000. His How to Marry a King (1969) and Six Make it Through the World (1972) are highly imaginative adaptations of fairy tales by the Grimm Brothers, and together with his 1975 Till Eulenspiegel, which is based on Renaissance stories that had been Christa and Gerhard Wolf recast into a film narration incorporating period history, present a very substantial contribution to World Cinema's carnivalesque film genre. His 1985 film The Woman and the Stranger won the Golden Bear award at the 35th Berlin International Film Festival. His 1980 film Jadup and Boel entered into the 16th Moscow International Film Festival in 1989.

== Selected filmography ==
- How to Marry a King (1969)
- Six Make It Through the World (1972)
- Till Eulenspiegel (1975) — film about Till Eulenspiegel (18+)
- Jadup and Boel (1980)
- Das Luftschiff (1983) — based on a novel by Fritz Rudolf Fries
- The Woman and the Stranger (1985) — based on a novella by Leonhard Frank
- Die Besteigung des Chimborazo (1989) — film about Alexander von Humboldt
- Der Fall Ö. (1991) — screenplay by Ulrich Plenzdorf, based on a story by Franz Fühmann
