= Mélo (film) =

1986 film by Alain Resnais

- Directed by: Alain Resnais
- Written by: Alain Resnais; Henri Bernstein (play)
- Produced by: Marin Karmitz; Catherine Lapoujade (executive producer)
- Starring: Fanny Ardant; André Dussollier; Sabine Azéma; Pierre Arditi
- Cinematography: Charles Van Damme
- Edited by: Albert Jurgenson
- Music by: M. Philippe-Gérard
- Distributed by: mk2 films
- Release date: September 3, 1986
- Running time: 112 minutes
- Country: France
- Language: French

Mélo is a 1986 French romantic drama film directed by Alain Resnais and starring Fanny Ardant, André Dussollier, Sabine Azéma and Pierre Arditi based on the 1929 play by Henri Bernstein.

== Plot ==
Pierre Belcroix and Marcel Blanc are violinists and lifelong friends living in Paris in the 1920s. While Marcel has become famous and Pierre has not, both are happy with their lives. Pierre is happily married to Romaine, a stylish young flapper. However, Marcel meets and falls in love with her, which Pierre little suspects. Romaine carries on her affair with Marcel, even as Pierre falls ill, which she may have deliberately exacerbated with her treatment in order to murder him. Soon Marcel goes on a concert tour, and Romaine abandons Pierre for a romantic tryst. When Marcel returns, Romaine reconsiders the affair, and realizes that she loves both Pierre and Marcel. She decides that she does not want to hurt either her husband or her lover, and as no other solution seems possible, she commits suicide. Three years later, Pierre visits Marcel to seek the truth, and Marcel tells him that no illicit affair occurred, thereby honoring her memory.

== Cast ==
- Sabine Azéma as Romaine Belcroix
- Fanny Ardant as Christiane Levesque
- Pierre Arditi as Pierre Belcroix
- André Dussollier as Marcel Blanc
- Jacques Dacqmine as Dr. Remy
- Hubert Gignoux as Le Prêtre
- Catherine Arditi as Yvonne

== Production ==
Filming took place between 16 December 1985 and 14 January 1986.

== Reception ==
Vincent Canby of The New York Times wrote that Mélo, "though it appears to be limpid, is as maddening as Marienbad. It's not obscure, but it's difficult to understand what it is about the project that so fascinates this most sophisticated and intellectual of French film makers." Describing the film, he wrote, "Though the camera moves in for close-ups from time to time, the sets and lighting are intentionally artificial. A curtain falls between acts, and scenes are played in extended, fluid, unbroken takes that evoke the theatrical experience. Unfortunately, the film's opening scene sets such a high standard that nothing that follows can come up to it."

Scott Foundas of Variety wrote that Resnais' films involve "seeing just how far he can ostensibly push an audience away by exposing his artistic scaffolding ... all the while stealthily drawing us closer in. And beginning with 'Melo' in 1986, this ongoing experiment has increasingly drawn on explicitly theatrical aesthetic devices to at once push and pull at the audience’s attentions."

The film was presented at the Museum of Modern Art on June 21, 2014, with the write-up stating that "Resnais’ symmetrical compositions and extended long takes emphasize the artificiality of the proceedings while liberating their emotional truth."

On review aggregator website Rotten Tomatoes, the film holds an approval rating of 83% based on 8 reviews, with an average rating of 6.3/10.

== Accolades ==
The film won the César Award for Best Actress and Best Supporting Actor, and was nominated for Best Film, Best Actor, Best Director, Best Cinematography, Best Costume Design and Best Production Design.
