= 1919 (film) =

1985 film

- Theatrical release poster
- Directed by: Hugh Brody
- Written by: Hugh Brody; Michael Ignatieff
- Produced by: Nita Amy
- Starring: Paul Scofield
- Cinematography: Ivan Strasburg
- Edited by: David Gladwell
- Music by: Brian Gascoigne
- Distributed by: British Film Institute
- Release date: February 1985
- Running time: 99 minutes
- Country: United Kingdom
- Language: English

1919 is a 1985 British drama film directed by Hugh Brody and written by Michael Ignatieff together with Brody. It stars Paul Scofield. It was entered into the 35th Berlin International Film Festival. The film's title is often stylized numerically as 1919 while the film itself bears the title Nineteen Nineteen.

== Cast ==
- Paul Scofield as Alexander Scherbatov
- Maria Schell as Sophie Rubin
- Frank Finlay as Sigmund Freud (voice)
- Diana Quick as Anna
- Clare Higgins as Young Sophie
- Colin Firth as Young Alexander
- Sandra Berkin as Nina
- Alan Tilvern as Sophie's father
