= The Empire of the Angels =

2000 book by Bernard Werber

The Empire of the Angels (lit.)
- Author: Bernard Werber
- Original title: L'Empire des Anges
- Language: French
- Series: Les Thanatonautes trilogy
- Genre: Novel
- Publisher: Albin Michel
- Publication date: 2000
- Publication place: France
- Preceded by: Les Thanatonautes
- Followed by: Nous les dieux

The Empire of the Angels (French: L'Empire des Anges) is a 2000 science fiction novel by French writer Bernard Werber.

== Plot ==
Michelle Panson goes to heaven. He finds himself on the "last judgment", which is led by three archangels. The most terrible test for a person is the subsequent reincarnation. From reincarnation he is saved by the guardian angel Emil Zola. Michelle has a choice: to become an angel or a preacher on earth. The choice falls on the angel. He opens the way to the world of angels, in which Edmond Wells becomes his angel-mentor. Each angel is given three "clients". The choice of their clients is behind the angels, and Michelle chooses three families that are shown in the "lake of conception". One family turns out to be rich - from America, another from France and a very poor family - from Russia. Edmond Wells narrates that the soul has three main indicators: 25% of events occurring with a person are determined by heredity, 25% - by karma, and another 50% remain for free choice. At the same time, Michelle Panson and Raoul Razorbak are looking for the world of the "sevenths" who are higher in development than the angels. Raoul assumes they are gods.

Later it turns out that the Russian "client" Igor Chekhov is the reincarnation of Felix Kerboz, one of the main characters of the novel "Thanatonauts". The characters of all three "clients" gradually emerge: Jacques Nemro is a Frenchman, an insecure young man, Venera Sheridan is an American, a narcissistic girl whom everyone adores, and Igor becomes strong and dexterous, but his mother leaves him. At the age of 7, Jacques has problems with memory, because of this, he does not study well. Venera is photographed on the covers of calendars and children's clothing catalogs. Igor ended up in an orphanage, but the boy Peter takes control of Igor and his friends and demands tribute from them in the form of cigarettes. Everyone asks for a present for Christmas. Igor wants “Peter to be stabbed in the belly”, Venera asks for plastic surgery on her nose, and Jacques wants to be presented with a toy flying ship. Michelle fulfills their requests. In particular, when Igor was to be adopted, he stabbed Peter in the stomach and almost killed him, so Igor, along with his friend Vanya (he gave Igor a knife), was sent to a juvenile colony.

Meanwhile, in Paradise, Michelle and Raoul learned that Edmond Wells was writing the fourth volume of the Encyclopedia of Relative and Absolute Knowledge. For this he uses the medium Ulysses Papadopoulos. At night, he dreams of new articles. Edmond Wells dictates them to him. To find out who the “sevenths” are and where they are, Michelle and Raoul descend to Earth to Papadopoulos, thinking that Wells told him about the “sevenths”.
