= Leonhard Frank =

German writer (1882–1961)

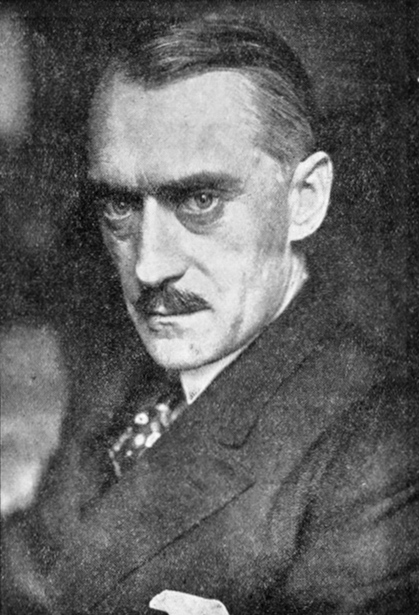
Leonhard Frank, before 1929

Leonhard Frank (4 September 1882 in Würzburg – 18 August 1961 in Munich) was a German expressionist writer. He studied painting and graphic art in Munich, and gained acclaim with his first novel The Robber Band (1914, tr. 1928). When a Berlin journalist celebrated in a famous café about news of the loss of the ship RMS Lusitania, torpedoed by a German submarine, Frank was upset – and slapped the man in his face. That is why he went into exile in Switzerland (1915–18), where he wrote a series of pacifist short-stories published under the title Man is Good. He returned to Germany, but after the Nazis gained power in 1933 Frank had to emigrate a second time. He lived in Switzerland again, moved to London, then Paris and finally fled under adventurous conditions to the United States in 1940, returning to Munich in 1950. His best-known novels were In the Last Coach (1925, tr. 1935) and Carl and Anna, which he dramatized in 1929. In 1947 MGM made a movie titled Desire Me out of this story.

== Style and Motif ==
Leonhard Frank's novels and plays are known for their sensationalism. Frank's prose was compact and austere. This choice of style was used effectively to highlight his favorite theme—the damage inflicted by bourgeois society on the individual spirit.

== Works ==
Frank had become a writer after working as a commercial artist. His first novel, The Robber Band, published in 1914, was an immediate success. The book tells the story of a group of rebellious young boys who harbour ambitions of dismantling their exploitative society and replacing it with an ideal one. But, as it often happens, the belligerent youth turn into docile adults, the good citizens of an unquestioning society. The story, like so many of his writings, presents the humorous facet of the middle class in a realistic manner. He published other books during his exile in Switzerland like The Cause of the Crime (1915), a scathing criticism of repressive educational systems, and Man Is Good (1917), a revolutionary denunciation of war.

Frank was a staunch believer in socialism. He regarded the overthrow of capitalism as paramount to the establishment of socialism. This desire was reflected in his novels A Middle-Class Man (1924) and in The Singers (1927). It was also during this period of semi-autobiographical writings that Frank produced what is regarded as his best work, the novel Carl and Anna (1926). The novel was a realistic masterpiece in which a soldier seduces his comrade's wife.

Success came with a price for Frank. His revolutionary writings did not go down well with the Nazis, who banned his books in 1933 and burned them. He did not get published in Germany again until in 1952, when his autobiographical novel Heart on the Left came out.

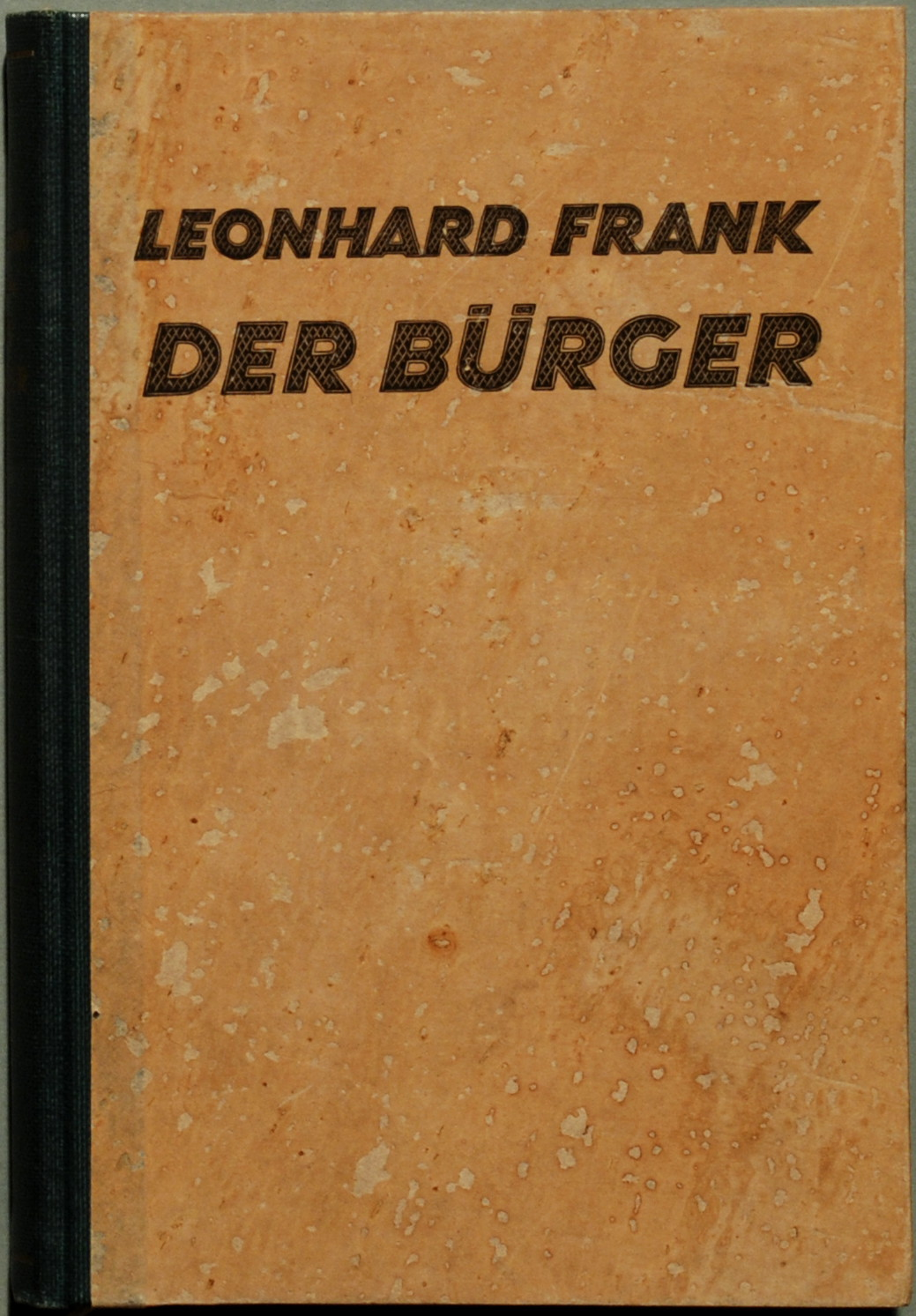
Cover of Leonhard Frank's 1924 novel A Middle-Class Man.

== Filmography ==
=== Film adaptations ===
- Homecoming, directed by Joe May (Germany, 1928, based on the novella Karl und Anna)
- Band of Thieves, directed by Hans Behrendt (Germany, 1928, based on the novel Die Räuberbande)
- Desire Me (USA, 1947, based on the novella Karl und Anna)
- Der Prozeß wird vertagt, directed by Herbert Ballmann (East Germany, 1958, based on the novella Michaels Rückkehr)
- The Story of a Murder, directed by Joachim Hasler (East Germany, 1965, based on the novel Die Jünger Jesu)
- The Baroness, directed by Oswald Döpke (West Germany, 1972, TV film, based on the novella Deutsche Novelle)
- Die Kurve, directed by Wolf-Dieter Panse (East Germany, 1974, TV film, based on the play Die Kurve)
- Der Mörder, directed by Jurij Kramer (East Germany, 1976, TV film, based on the novella Die Ursache)
- The Singers, directed by Michael Verhoeven (West Germany, 1978, TV film, based on the novel Das Ochsenfurter Männerquartett)
- Ende vom Lied, directed by Jurij Kramer (East Germany, 1979, TV film, based on the novel Das Ochsenfurter Männerquartett)
- The Cause of the Crime, directed by Michael Verhoeven (West Germany, 1980, TV film, based on the novella Die Ursache)
- The Woman and the Stranger, directed by Rainer Simon (East Germany, 1985, based on the novella Karl und Anna)

=== Screenwriter ===
- Band of Thieves (dir. Hans Behrendt, 1928)
- The Murderer Dimitri Karamazov (dir. Fedor Ozep, 1931)
- Hell on Earth (dir. Victor Trivas, 1931)
- The Victor (dir. Hans Hinrich and Paul Martin, 1932)
