= Our Earthmen Friends =

Nos amis les Terriens
- Directed by: Bernard Werber
- Written by: Bernard Werber
- Produced by: Claude Lelouch
- Starring: Pierre Arditi; Audrey Dana; Boris Ventura; Annelise Hesme; Thomas Le Douarec
- Edited by: Stephane Mazalaigue
- Music by: Alex Jaffray; Loïc Etienne
- Distributed by: Les Films 13
- Release dates: 24 August 2006 (Montréal World Film Festival); 18 April 2007 (France)
- Running time: 85 minutes
- Country: France
- Language: French

Our Earthmen Friends (French: Nos amis les Terriens) is a French film released theatrically in April 2007 and produced by Claude Lelouch. It has been adapted from the play written by Bernard Werber Nos Amis Les Humains.

== Plot ==
The film is shot as if extraterrestrials were making a documentary about humans. A voice-over gives the analysis of the extraterrestrials. This external point of view allows to analyze the human behavior. The aim is to make the beholder think about their condition of human being. Two couples are studied: the husband of the first couple and the wife of the second are trapped into an invisible cage while the two others are studied in their environment. Extraterrestrials are doing experiments on the two prisoners.
