= Annelise Hesme =

French actress (born 1976)

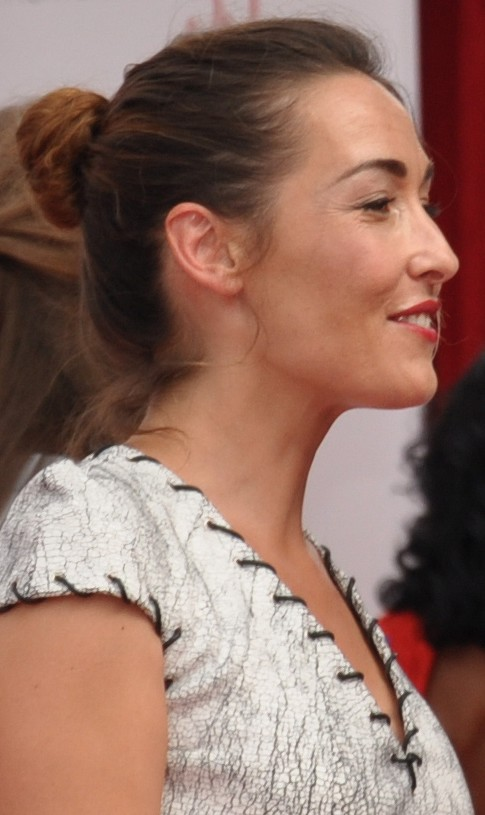
- Monte-Carlo Television Festival 2015
- Born: 11 May 1976 (age 50); Beaumont, Puy-de-Dôme, Auvergne, France
- Occupation: Actress
- Years active: 1998–present

Annelise Hesme (born 11 May 1976) is a French actress. Her older sister Élodie Hesme and younger sister Clotilde Hesme are also actresses.

Born in Beaumont, Puy-de-Dôme, Auvergne, France.

Hesme has appeared in many films such as Tanguy (2001), Avenue Montaigne (2006), and Alexander (2004) as Stateira. She also appeared in the French film Priceless with fellow actress and townswoman Audrey Tautou in 2006.

As well as this, she has become particularly well known and popular in the United Kingdom and Ireland following the 2005 Renault Clio advert "France vs. Britain" directed by Jordan Scott who also directed the 2007 follow up spot "More Va Va Voom" again starring Hesme as Sophie and British actor Jeremy Sheffield as Ben.

2007, She can also be seen in the Molière playing the rôle of an actress in his troupe, and Our Earthmen Friends by Bernard Werber.

Also in Paris by Cédric Klapisch, Not My Type by Lucas Belvaux, Le Père Noël starring Tahar Rahim, One Wild Moment by Jean-François Richet, and as Éloïse Martin alongside Kris Marshall in the 2015 independent British film Sparks & Embers.

Television appearances are L'État de Grace (2006), Chateaubriand (2010) as Juliette Récamier, Inquisitio (2012), R.I.S, police scientifique (2014), and Title role for Nina since 2015.

Hesme plays both the cello and the piano. She is fluent in English and French.
