= 35th Berlin International Film Festival =

1985 film festival in West Berlin, Germany

- Festival poster
- Location: West Berlin, Germany
- Founded: 1951
- Awards: Golden Bear: The Woman and the Stranger and Wetherby
- No. of films: 326 films
- Festival date: 15–26 February 1985
- Website: http://www.berlinale.de

Berlin International Film Festival chronology
- 36th 34th

The 35th annual Berlin International Film Festival was held from 15 to 26 February 1985. The retrospective was dedicated to Special effects.

The Golden Bear was jointly awarded to The Woman and the Strangler directed by Rainer Simon and Wetherby directed by David Hare.

== Juries ==
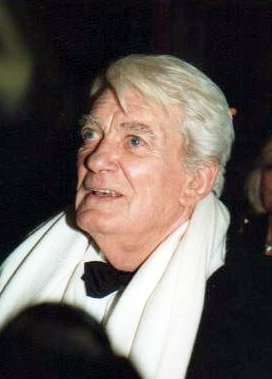
Jean Marais, Jury President

The following people were announced as being on the jury for the festival:

- Jean Marais, French actor - Jury President
- Max von Sydow, Swedish actor
- Alberto Sordi, Italian actor and filmmaker
- Regimantas Adomaitis, Soviet actor
- Sheila Benson, American journalist and film critic
- Wolfgang Kohlhaase, East German writer
- Onat Kutlar, Turkish poet, essayist and screenwriter
- Luis Megino, Spanish writer and producer
- Ingrid Scheib-Rothbart, West-German head of the Goethe-Institut of New York
- Chris Sievernich, West-German producer
- István Szabó, Hungarian filmmaker

== Official Sections ==
=== Main Competition ===
The following films were in competition for the Golden Bear:

English title	Original title	Director(s)	Production Country
1919		Hugh Brody	United Kingdom
After Darkness		Sergio Guerraz, Dominique Othenin-Girard	Switzerland
The Children	Les enfants	Marguerite Duras, Jean Mascolo, Jean-Marc Turine	France
Count to Ten	Contar hasta diez	Oscar Barney Finn	Argentina
Daengbyeot		Hah Myung-joong	South Korea
Death in a French Garden	Péril en la demeure	Michel Deville	France
The Death of the White Stallion	Der Tod des weißen Pferdes	Christian Ziewer	West Germany
The Descendant of the Snow Leopard	Ак илбирстин тукуму	Tolomush Okeyev	Soviet Union
Flowers of Reverie	Szirmok, virágok, koszorúk	László Lugossy	Hungary
Heartbreakers		Bobby Roth	United States
Hail Mary	Je vous salue, Marie	Jean-Luc Godard	France
Loafing and Camouflage	Λούφα και Παραλλαγή	Nikos Perakis	Greece
Morenga		Egon Günther	West Germany
Mrs. Soffel		Gillian Armstrong	United States
The Night of the Emerald Moon	Noc smaragdového měsíce	Václav Matějka	Czechoslovakia
Pehlivan		Zeki Ökten	Turkey
Pizza Connection		Damiano Damiani	Italy
Places in the Heart		Robert Benton	United States
The Practice of Love	Die Praxis der Liebe	Valie Export	West Germany
Ronia, the Robber's Daughter	Ronja Rövardotter	Tage Danielsson	Sweden
Seburi Monogatari	瀬降り物語	Sadao Nakajima	Japan
Stico		Jaime de Armiñán	Spain
Wetherby		David Hare	United Kingdom
The Woman and the Stranger	Die Frau und der Fremde	Rainer Simon	East Germany
Wrong World		Ian Pringle	Australia

=== Out of competition ===
- 2010: The Year We Make Contact, directed by Peter Hyams (United States)
- Brazil, directed by Terry Gilliam (United Kingdom)
- Country, directed by Richard Pearce (United States)
- Grünstein's Clever Move, directed by Bernhard Wicki (West Germany)
- Niemanns Zeit – Ein deutscher Heimatfilm, directed by Horst Kurnitzky and Marion Schmid (West Germany)
- International Military Tribunal for the Far East, directed by Masaki Kobayashi (Japan)
- Yamaha yudang (雅马哈鱼档), directed by Zhang Liang (China)

=== Retrospective ===
1985 Retrospective poster, dedicated to special effects

The following films were shown in the retrospective "Special Effects":

English title	Original title	Director(s)	Production country
20,000 Leagues Under The Sea		Richard Fleischer	United States
7 Faces of Dr. Lao		George Pal	United States
The 7th Voyage of Sinbad		Nathan H. Juran	United States
Abbott and Costello Meet the Invisible Man		Charles Lamont	United States
Münchhausen		Josef von Báky	Germany
Again and Again, Good Luck	Immer wieder Glück	Ferdinand Diehl	West Germany
Air Mail		John Ford	United States
Alien		Ridley Scott	United States, United Kingdom
Beauty and the Beast	La Belle et la Bête	Jean Cocteau	France
The Birds		Alfred Hitchcock	United States
Blithe Spirit		David Lean	United Kingdom
Captain Sindbad		Byron Haskin	United States, West Germany
Citizen Kane		Orson Welles	United States
Close Encounters of the Third Kind		Steven Spielberg	United States
Darby O'Gill and the Little People		Robert Stevenson	United States
Das Boot		Wolfgang Petersen	West Germany
Destination Moon		Irving Pichel	United States
The Devil-Doll		Tod Browning	United States
The Empire Strikes Back		Irvin Kershner	United States
End of the World	La fin du monde	Abel Gance	France
Eraserhead		David Lynch	United States
The Exorcist		William Friedkin	United States
The Fabulous Baron Munchausen	Baron Prášil	Karel Zeman	Czechoslovakia
Forbidden Planet		Fred McLeod Wilcox	United States
Georges Méliès – short films from the years 1896 to 1912		Georges Méliès	France
Godzilla	ゴジラ	Ishirō Honda	Japan
The Golden Key	Zolotoy Klyuchik (Золотой ключик)	Aleksandr Ptushko	Soviet Union
Hardware Wars		Ernie Fosselius	United States
The Haunting		Robert Wise	United Kingdom
Heart of Stone	Das kalte Herz	Paul Verhoeven	East Germany
The Haunted Castle	Das Spukschloß im Spessart	Kurt Hoffmann	West Germany
The Incredible Shrinking Man		Jack Arnold	United States
The Incredible Shrinking Woman		Joel Schumacher	United States
The Invisible Man		James Whale	United States
The Invisible Man Returns		Joe May	United States
The Invisible Woman		Edward Sutherland	United States
Invisible Agent		Edwin L. Marin	United States
Island of Lost Souls		Erle C. Kenton	United States
It's a Mad, Mad, Mad, Mad World		Stanley Kramer	United States
Jason and the Argonauts		Don Chaffey	United States, United Kingdom
Journey to the Beginning of Time	Cesta do praveku	Karel Zeman	Czechoslovakia
The Lost World		Harry O. Hoyt	United States
Magic Seed	Волшебное зерно	Fyodor Filippov and Valentin Kadochnikov	Soviet Union
Man with a Movie Camera	Человек с киноаппаратом	Dziga Vertov	Soviet Union
Marry Poppins		Robert Stevenson	United States
Metropolis		Fritz Lang	Germany
The Mysterious Island		Lucien Hubbard, Maurice Tourneur and Benjamin Christensen	United States
The New Gulliver	Новый Гулливер	Aleksandr Ptushko	Soviet Union
Operation Undersea		Winston Hibler and Hamilton Luske	United States
Orpheus	Orphée	Jean Cocteau	France
Poltergeist		Tobe Hooper	United States
San Francisco		W. S. Van Dyke	United States
Serials: Flying heroes and smoking spaceships (includes Flash Gordon Conquers the Universe)	Serials: Fliegende Helden und qualmende Raumschiffe	Ford Beebe, Ray Taylor and others	United States
Silent Running		Douglas Trumbull	United States
The Son of Kong		Ernest B. Schoedsack	United States
Space Patrol – The Fantastic Adventures of the Spaceship Orion	Raumpatrouille – Die phantastischen Abenteuer des Raumschiffes Orion	Theo Mezger	West Germany
Star Wars		George Lucas	United States, United Kingdom
The Student of Prague	Der Student von Prag	Stellan Rye	Germany
Sylvia and the Ghost	Sylvie et le fantôme	Claude Autant-Lara	France
Synthetischer Film		Helmut Herbst	West Germany
Testament of Orpheus	Le testament d'Orphée	Jean Cocteau	France
Things to Come		William Cameron Menzies	United Kingdom
This Island Earth		Joseph Newman and Jack Arnold	United States
Tommy		Ken Russell	United Kingdom
Topper Returns		Roy Del Ruth	United States
Universe		Colin Low and Roman Kroitor	Canada
The War Of The Worlds		Byron Haskin	United States
The Wizard Of Oz		Victor Fleming	United States
The Wonderful World of the Brothers Grimm		Henry Levin and George Pal	United States

== Official Awards ==
The following prizes were awarded by the Jury:

- Golden Bear:
  - The Woman and the Strangler by Rainer Simon
  - Wetherby by David Hare
- Silver Bear – Special Jury Prize: Flowers of Reverie by László Lugossy
- Silver Bear for Best Director: Robert Benton for Places in the Heart
- Silver Bear for Best Actress: Jo Kennedy for Wrong World
- Silver Bear for Best Actor: Fernando Fernán Gómez for Stico
- Silver Bear for an outstanding single achievement: Tolomush Okeyev for The Descendant of Snow Leopard
- Silver Bear for an outstanding artistic contribution: Ronja Rövardotter
- Honourable Mention:
  - Damiano Damiani for Pizza Connection
  - Les enfants
  - Tarık Akan for Pehlivan

== Independent Awards ==
=== FIPRESCI Award ===
- Tōkyō saiban by Masaki Kobayashi

== Literature ==
- Brigitte Tast: Als Farbe das Grau, als Format der Innenblick. 35. Internationale Filmfestspiele Berlin 1985, Schellerten 2014, ISBN 978-3-88842-045-0
