= Les Thanatonautes =

1994 novel by Bernard Werber

The Thanatonauts
- Author: Bernard Werber
- Original title: Les Thanatonautes
- Language: French
- Series: Les Thanatonautes trilogy
- Genre: novel
- Publisher: Albin Michel
- Publication date: 1994
- Publication place: France
- Followed by: The Empire of the Angels

Les Thanatonautes (The Thanatonauts) is a 1994 science fiction novel by French writer Bernard Werber. The book deals with the search for afterlife.

Les Thanatonautes is first in a five-part series. Together with L'Empire des anges (The Empire of the Angels, 2000) and Nous les dieux ("Us the Gods", 2004), it makes up the Les Thanatonautes trilogy. Nous les dieux, together with Le souffle des dieux ("The Breath of the Gods", 2005) and Le mystère des dieux ("The Mystery of the Gods", 2007), make up the Nous les dieux trilogy.

The book, which one could classify as philosophic science fiction (with a hint of fantasy), takes readers on a voyage to the last unexplored continent, death. The term thanatonaute is derived from "thanatologie", comes from the Greek god of death Thanatos and nautis (navigateur) and thus signifies navigator of death or explorer of death.

The novel tells the story of a researcher Michael Pinson and his friend Raoul Razorbak who go explore the Ultimate Continent (called New Australia): the continent of death. This adventure takes us across the different zones of the continent of the dead to the famous light. In doing these explorations the thanatonautes voluntarily risk their lives to discover the mysteries of death.

The book is scattered regularly with a number of different sacred texts drawn from mythology, religion, and cosmogony from all over the world to highlight how each of these points of view resemble each other and tell the same story just with different words and symbols.

== See also ==
- Flatliners
