= Jadup and Boel =

1980 film

- Directed by: Rainer Simon
- Written by: Paul Kanut Schäfer; Rainer Simon
- Starring: Kurt Böwe
- Cinematography: Roland Dressel
- Release date: 1980
- Running time: 100 minutes
- Country: East Germany
- Language: German

Jadup and Boel (German: Jadup und Boel) is a 1980 East German drama film directed by Rainer Simon. It was entered into the 16th Moscow International Film Festival in 1989.

== Cast ==
- Kurt Böwe as Jadup
- Katrin Knappe as Boel Martin
- Gudrun Ritter as Barbara Jadup
- Timo Jakob as Max Jadup (as Timo Jacob)
- Käthe Reichel as Frau Martin
- Franciszek Pieczka as Willi Unger
- Heide Kipp as Frau Unger
- Michael Gwisdek as Herr Gwissen
- Rolf-Martin Kruckenberg as Leutnant Wenzel
- Christian Böwe as Der junge Jadup
- Dirk Nawrocki as Junger Wenzel
