= Band of Thieves (1928 film) =

1928 film

- Directed by: Hans Behrendt
- Written by: Leonhard Frank (novel and screenplay); Franz Schulz
- Produced by: Hermann Fellner; Josef Somlo
- Starring: Paul Hörbiger; Leonhard Frank; Gustl Gstettenbaur
- Cinematography: Otto Kanturek
- Production companies: Felsom Film; Fox Europa Film
- Distributed by: Deutsche Fox
- Release date: 13 November 1928
- Country: Germany
- Languages: Silent; German intertitles

Band of Thieves (German: Die Räuberbande) is a 1928 German silent film directed by Hans Behrendt and starring Paul Hörbiger, Leonhard Frank and Gustl Gstettenbaur. The film's sets were designed by the art director Oscar Friedrich Werndorff. It was distributed by the German branch of Fox Film.

== Cast ==
- Paul Hörbiger
- Leonhard Frank
- Gustl Gstettenbaur
- Martin Herzberg
- Fritz Draeger
- Kurt Zarewski
- Ilse Baumann
- Kurt Katch
- Otto Kronburger
- Marija Leiko

== Bibliography ==
- Bock, Hans-Michael; Bergfelder, Tim, eds. (2009). The Concise Cinegraph: Encyclopaedia of German Cinema. New York: Berghahn Books. ISBN 978-1-57181-655-9.
