= Le Jour des fourmis =

1992 novel by Bernard Werber

The Day of the Ants
- Book cover for Le Jour des fourmis (1992), translated into English as The Day of the Ants
- Author: Bernard Werber
- Original title: Le Jour des fourmis
- Language: French
- Series: Les Fourmis trilogy
- Genre: Novel
- Publisher: Le Livre de Poche
- Publication date: 1992
- Publication place: France
- Media type: Print (Paperback & Hardback)

Le Jour des fourmis (English: The Day of the Ants) is a 1992 science fiction novel by French writer Bernard Werber. It is the second novel of La Saga des Fourmis trilogy (also known as La Trilogie des Fourmis (The Trilogy of the Ants), preceded by Les Fourmis (The Empire of the Ants, 1991) and followed by La Révolution des fourmis (The Revolution of the Ants, 1995).

== Plot summary ==
The Day of the Ants, like its predecessor, has several connected plot lines, some of which take place in the world of humans; others among ants. A year has passed since the time of the first novel. 17 people, including several relatives of Edmond Wells, the pioneer of the deceased inter-species communication, are still trapped under an ant nest. Since a new queen has been in charge in the ant nest, the supplies of food given by the ants to the humans are growing increasingly smaller. Meanwhile, strange murders are happening in the city of Paris, when several producers of insecticides are found dead in peculiar circumstances with no explanation of how the murders were committed. A wolf-fearing police detective and a human-fearing woman, Edmond Wells's daughter, combine their knowledge in order to find out who or what is behind these murders.

== Themes ==
=== Learning from each other ===
One of the central themes of the novel is that humans can learn a lot from the civilisation of the ants and vice versa. The people living under the ant nest are acting more and more like ants and thus reach spiritual enlightenment. Meanwhile, some of the ants from the nest discover religion, through humans, and start praising humans (or Fingers, as ants call them) as gods.

=== Humans are not the owners of the earth ===
In one chapter of Edmond Wells' Encyclopaedia of relative and absolute knowledge, the protagonist is asked about the best way to get rid of ants in one's apartment. Wells replies that there is no reason why one should consider themself more of an owner of their own flat than ants. He claims that merely buying something from another human does not mean that something is theirs now - one has merely more rights to be its owner now than other humans.

Ants in this novel consider themselves the masters of the Earth and even claim to have been the cause of dinosaurs' extinction. Meanwhile, cockroaches feeding from human trash consider humans their slaves.
