= Empire of the Ants (novel) =

1991 novel by Bernard Werber

- First edition
- Author: Bernard Werber
- Original title: Les Fourmis
- Language: French
- Series: Les Fourmis trilogy
- Genre: Novel
- Publisher: Le Livre de Poche
- Publication date: 1991
- Publication place: France
- Media type: Print (Paperback & Hardback)
- Pages: 306

Les Fourmis (English: The Ants) is a 1991 science fiction novel by French writer Bernard Werber. It was released in English as Empire of the Ants. The book sold more than two million copies and has been translated into more than 30 languages. A video game adaptation was released in 2000.

Les Fourmis is the first novel of La Saga des Fourmis trilogy (also known as La Trilogie des Fourmis (The Trilogy of the Ants), followed by Le Jour des fourmis (The Day of the Ants, 1992) and La Révolution des fourmis (The Revolution of the Ants, 1996).

== Plot ==
The plot begins as two stories that take place in parallel: one in the world of humans (in Paris), the other in the world of ants (in a Formica rufa colony in a park near Paris). The time is the early 21st century (the near future, relative to the time when Werber wrote the book). The human character receives a house and a provocative message as inheritance from his recently deceased uncle. He begins to investigate his uncle's life and mysterious activities, and decides to descend into the cellar of the house but does not return. His family and other people follow and disappear. The ant character is a male whose foraging expedition gets destroyed in one strike by a mysterious force that comes from above. He suspects that a colony of another ant species has attacked them with a secret weapon, and attempts to meet with the queen and to rally other ants to investigate the disaster. However, he attracts the attention of a secret group of ants within the same colony that appear to want to conceal this information. As the plot unfolds, the humans and the ants encounter new mysteries and participate in challenging events, including a war between different ant species.

== Reception ==
The descriptions of ant morphology, behavior, and social organization as well as their interactions with other species are detailed and scientifically based, although Werber significantly exaggerates the reasoning and communication capabilities of the ants, and the work is usually labeled as science fiction, though some consider it more akin to speculative fiction.

Gideon Kibblewhite reviewed Empire of the Ants for Arcane magazine, rating it a 9 out of 10 overall, and stated that "Empire of the Ants is already a best-seller in more than 20 countries - 800,000 copies have been bought in Korea alone. Presumably the Koreans have contact with more full-on ants than we do, but this book is sure to become at least a cult classic over here too - maybe not for its literary quality, but certainly for its quirky, unique and valuable sense of perspective. Read it and you'll never pour petrol on an ants' nest again."

Katharine Mills, reviewing the book for SF Site, wrote: "The book is seeded with excerpts from Uncle Edmond's Encyclopedia, describing the ants' culture from a human perspective, a device which, combined with the intimate glimpses of their daily lives, illustrates the superficiality of human scientific observation." She also posed: "The real question, the final question left at the end of the book when all the other mysteries have been solved is this: Are humans really ready to communicate with another species? And, more frighteningly, what happens next – when our efforts have drawn the attention of the other species to us? Read Empire of the Ants, and contemplate it."

== Video games ==
The novel was adapted as a 3D strategy video game for the Microsoft Windows platform; it was developed and published by Microïds in France on April 20, 2000 and published by Strategy First on July 17, 2001.

A new video game adaptation, with photo-realistic visuals, was released on November 6, 2024. It was developed by Tower Five and published by Microids.

== See also ==
- Anthill: A Novel
- "The Empire of the Ants", a 1905 short story by H. G. Wells
