= Wetherby (film) =

1985 film by David Hare

- Directed by: David Hare
- Written by: David Hare
- Produced by: Simon Relph
- Starring: Vanessa Redgrave; Ian Holm; Judi Dench; Stuart Wilson; Tim McInnerny; Suzanna Hamilton
- Cinematography: Stuart Harris
- Music by: Nick Bicât
- Distributed by: Palace Pictures
- Release dates: February 1985 (Berlin Film Festival); 8 March 1985
- Running time: 102 minutes
- Country: United Kingdom
- Language: English
- Budget: £1,125,000
- Box office: $1.3 million

Wetherby is a 1985 British mystery drama film written and directed by playwright David Hare and starring Vanessa Redgrave, Ian Holm, Judi Dench, Stuart Wilson, Tim McInnerny, and Suzanna Hamilton.

== Plot ==
Set in the town of Wetherby in West Yorkshire, the film focuses on Jean Travers, a middle-aged spinster schoolteacher. One evening, she invites married friends for a dinner party, only to have some terrible repressions and past traumas dredged up when guest John Morgan expresses his emotional pain. The strange young man arrives at Jean's cottage the next morning with a gift of pheasants. While sitting at the kitchen table waiting for tea, he puts the barrel of a gun in his mouth and kills himself.

From this point onward, the film's story is told in chronologically discrete, interlocking flashbacks to the recent and distant past, showing actions and events as seen and experienced from various points of view. The central mystery of Morgan's suicide is the fulcrum around which the narrative turns. The narrative construction of the film resembles a jigsaw puzzle and, in keeping with Hare's style of exposition, frequently appears to have key pieces missing.

There are further scenes of the dinner party as well as scenes of the police investigation into the suicide. We learn Morgan had not been an invited guest—he walked in with others who assumed he was an acquaintance of Jean's, and Jean assumed that her friends had brought him with them.

An aloof and peculiar young woman named Karen Creasy—a former acquaintance of Morgan's—is delivered from the funeral to Jean's doorstep by Mike Langdon, one of the policemen conducting the inquest. For several weeks after, the girl insinuates herself into Jean's life and home and shows no intention of leaving. Sullen and self-centred, Karen is curiously unmoved by Morgan's death and is even hostile to his memory. It is later shown in flashbacks that Morgan had developed an obsession with Karen when they were both students at the University of Essex, and she had violently rebuffed his desperate attempt to initiate a relationship with her. It is implied this rejection may have been a factor in his decision to leave Essex for Yorkshire with the intention of committing suicide.

When Jean suggests to Karen that she may have been responsible for Morgan's decision to kill himself, the young woman angrily denies that her behaviour was, or is, in any way provocative. Karen makes it clear that she hates emotional involvements—what she harshly describes as "people digging into each other"—and likewise resents Jean's attempt to engage her in a close relationship. In a sudden fit of pique, Karen quits Jean's home and Wetherby for good. But before leaving, she cruelly taunts Jean by remarking that, if Morgan's suicide wasn't merely an accident, then she would love to know what possible role the spinster played in causing it.

In addition to the events occurring in the present day, there are flashbacks of Jean and her lifelong friend, Marcia, as teenagers in 1953. These scenes reveal Jean had been engaged to airman, Jim Mortimer, and that she failed to stop him from going away on active service in southeast Asia. In a brutal twist of fate, Jim was senselessly murdered in a gambling den during the anti-imperial uprisings in British Malaya.

As these episodes from the past and present criss-cross and overlap, Jean begins to understand the dull resentment and lonely despair that drove Morgan to take his life. She also seems to gain some insight into the restlessness and self-destructive impulses of the younger generation. In a related incident, she tries to get one of her female students to see the value of continuing her education (At the end of the film, Jean is told that the girl has dropped out of the Sixth Form to run away to London, presumably with a boyfriend).

Jean is likewise affected by the diminished hopes of her contemporaries, who bemoan the state of the country under Thatcherism. She regularly discusses these current matters with Stanley Pilborough, Marcia's husband and the town solicitor, who is often purposefully drunk. She observes the unhappy marriages of her middle-aged friends, particularly the endless bickering that goes on between Roger and Verity Braithwaite. Even lonely, despondent Mike Langdon confesses the failure of his relationship with his mistress, Chrissie, who eventually leaves him to return to her sheep farmer husband.

In the end, it seems that Jean no longer needs to mourn for the life she might have had, and the person she might have become, had she not allowed her fiancé to make his fatal departure for Malaya three decades earlier. She will make the best of what she has, and the way things are, in the here and now.

== Principal cast ==
- Vanessa Redgrave as Jean Travers
- Ian Holm as Stanley Pilborough
- Judi Dench as Marcia Pilborough
- Tim McInnerny as John Morgan
- Stuart Wilson as Mike Langdon
- Suzanna Hamilton as Karen Creasy
- Tom Wilkinson as Roger Braithwaite
- Marjorie Yates as Verity Braithwaite
- Joely Richardson as Young Jean
- Katy Behean as Young Marcia
- Robert Hines as Jim Mortimer

== Release ==
The film was screened at the 35th Berlin International Film Festival in February 1985. It was released in the UK on 8 March 1985 as the first film to be shown at the Curzon West End. It grossed $18,694 in its opening week.

== Critical reception ==
On the review aggregator website Rotten Tomatoes, 67% of 12 critics' reviews are positive, with an average rating of 7.6/10.

In her review in The New York Times, Janet Maslin observed the film was written "with a playwright's ear for elegant dialogue and a playwright's portentous sense of symmetry. While the former is certainly welcome on the screen, the latter is less at home, and it serves to make Wetherby a peculiar hybrid not entirely suited to either medium . . . the film's momentum varies unpredictably, with a rhythm that is sometimes abrupt, sometimes languid. Equally uneven is the acuteness of the dialogue, with passages that are particularly pointed interspersed with those whose bearing is at best indirect . . . However, Mr. Hare has assembled a superb cast, and its ensemble work is very fine . . . Miss Redgrave's warm, credible performance is very much the heart of the film. She brings to the character a crisp intelligence and a very deep compassion, while still managing to make every movement a surprise."

Roger Ebert of the Chicago Sun-Times called it "a haunting film, because it dares to suggest that the death of the stranger is important to everyone it touches – because it forces them to decide how alive they really are."

Time Out London notes, "Redgrave's performance is superb and she's ably supported by Holm, Dench, and Hamilton in particular."

== Awards and nominations ==
- Berlin International Film Festival Golden Bear for Best Motion Picture (winner, tie with Die Frau und der Fremde)
- Berlin International Film Festival C.I.C.A.E. Award (David Hare, winner)
- Berlin International Film Festival Interfilm Award – Honorable Mention (David Hare, winner)
- BAFTA Award for Best Actress in a Supporting Role (Judi Dench, nominee)
- National Society of Film Critics Award for Best Actress (Vanessa Redgrave, winner)
- Boston Society of Film Critics Award for Best Supporting Actor (Ian Holm, winner)
