= Ian Holm =

English actor (1931–2020)

Sir Ian Holm CBE
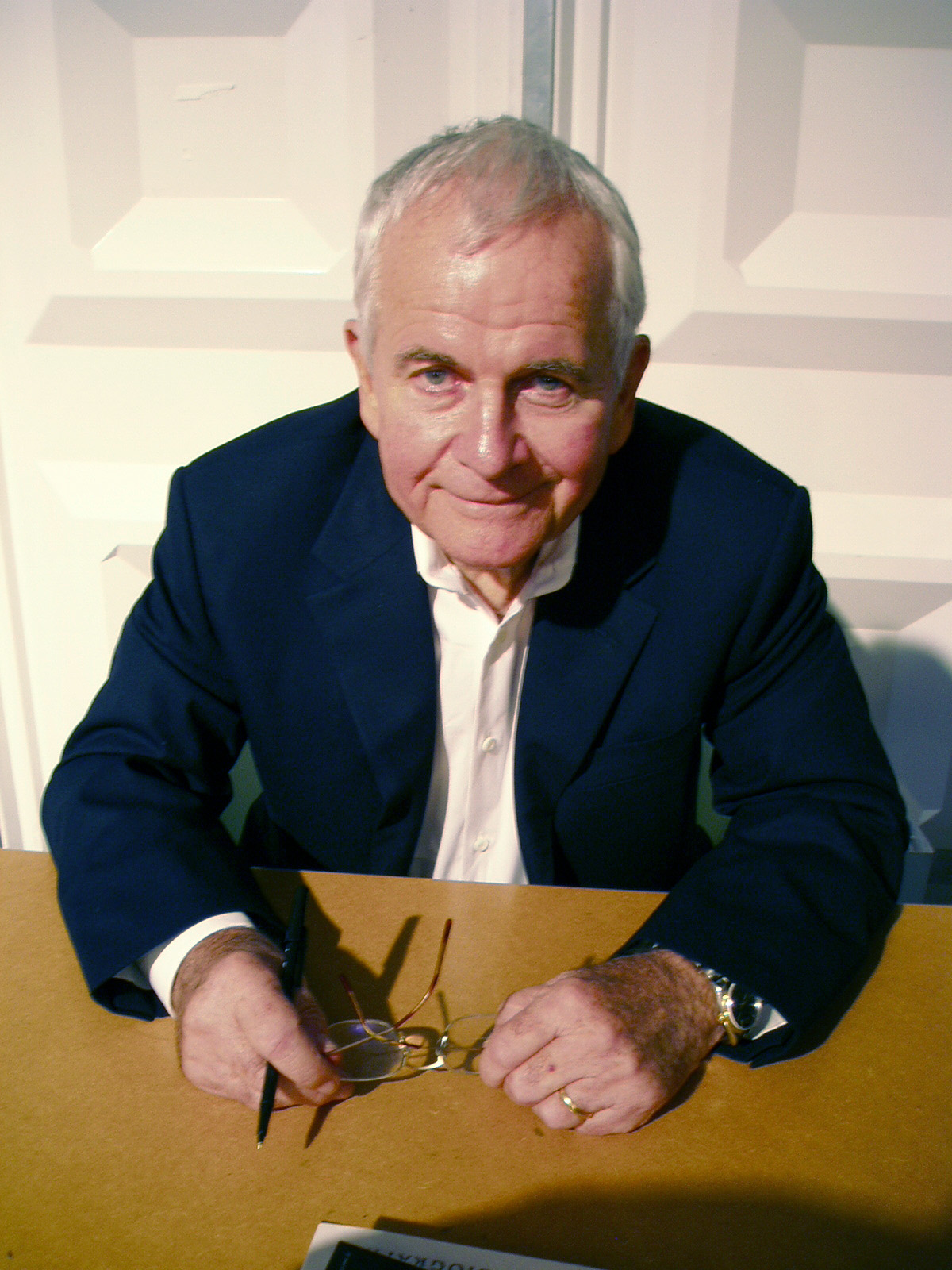
- Holm in Edinburgh in 2004
- Born: Ian Holm Cuthbert; 12 September 1931; Goodmayes, Essex, England
- Died: 19 June 2020 (aged 88); London, England
- Resting place: Highgate Cemetery
- Education: Royal Academy of Dramatic Art
- Occupation: Actor
- Years active: 1954–2014
- Spouses: Lynn Mary Shaw (m. 1955; div. 1965); Sophie Baker (m. 1982; div. 1986); Penelope Wilton (m. 1991; div. 2001); Sophie de Stempel (m. 2003)
- Children: 5
- Awards: Full list

Sir Ian Holm Cuthbert (12 September 1931 – 19 June 2020) was an English actor. After graduating from RADA (Royal Academy of Dramatic Art) and beginning his career on the British stage as a member of the Royal Shakespeare Company, he became a successful and prolific performer on television and in film. He received numerous accolades including two BAFTA Awards and a Tony Award, along with a nomination for an Academy Award. He was knighted by Queen Elizabeth II in 1998 for services to drama.

Holm won the 1967 Tony Award for Best Featured Actor for his performance as Lenny in the Harold Pinter play The Homecoming. He won the Laurence Olivier Award for Best Actor for his performance in the title role in the 1998 West End production of King Lear. For his television roles he received two Primetime Emmy Award nominations for King Lear, and the HBO film The Last of the Blonde Bombshells (2003).

Holm gained acclaim for his role in The Bofors Gun (1968), winning the BAFTA Award for Best Actor in a Supporting Role. He was nominated for an Academy Award for Best Supporting Actor, and won a second BAFTA Award for his role as athletics trainer Sam Mussabini in Chariots of Fire (1981). Other notable films he appeared in include Alien (1979), Brazil (1985), Dreamchild (1985), Henry V (1989), Naked Lunch (1991), The Madness of King George (1994), The Fifth Element (1997), The Sweet Hereafter (1997), and The Aviator (2004). He played Napoleon in three unrelated works between 1974 and 2001. He gained wider appreciation for his role as the elderly Bilbo Baggins in Peter Jackson's The Lord of the Rings (2001–2003) and The Hobbit (2012–2014) film trilogies, with the last film in the latter, 2014's The Battle of the Five Armies, being his final film role.

== Early life and education ==
Ian Holm Cuthbert was born on 12 September 1931 in Goodmayes, Essex, to Scottish parents, James Cuthbert and his wife Jean (née Holm). His father was a psychiatrist who worked as the superintendent of the West Ham Corporation Mental Hospital and was one of the pioneers of electric shock therapy; his mother was a nurse. He had an older brother who died when Ian was 12 years old. Holm was educated at the independent Chigwell School in Essex. His parents retired to Mortehoe in Devon and then to Worthing, where he joined an amateur dramatic society.

A chance encounter with Henry Baynton, a well-known provincial Shakespearean actor, helped Holm train for admission to the Royal Academy of Dramatic Art, where he secured a place from 1950. His studies were interrupted a year later when he was called up for National Service in the British Army, during which he was posted to Klagenfurt, Austria, and attained the rank of Lance Corporal. They were interrupted a second time when he volunteered to go on an acting tour of the United States in 1952. Holm graduated from the Royal Academy of Dramatic Art in 1953.

He made his stage debut in 1954, at Stratford-upon-Avon, playing a spear carrier in a staging of Othello. Two years later, he made his London stage debut in Love Affair.

== Career ==
Holm was an established actor in the Royal Shakespeare Company before he gained notice in television and film. He began in 1954 with minor roles, progressing to Puck in A Midsummer Night's Dream and the fool in King Lear. In 1965, he played Richard III in the BBC serialisation of The Wars of The Roses, based on the RSC production of the plays. He gained acclaim for his role in the 1968 film The Bofors Gun, winning the BAFTA Award for Best Actor in a Supporting Role. In 1969, he appeared in Moonlight on the Highway. He took on minor roles in films such as Oh! What a Lovely War (1969), Nicholas and Alexandra (1971), Mary, Queen of Scots (1972) and Young Winston (1972).

In 1967, Holm won a Tony Award for Best Featured Actor in a Play as Lenny in The Homecoming by Harold Pinter. Holm appeared in the 1977 television drama Jesus of Nazareth as the Sadducee Zerah, and as the villain in March or Die. The following year, he played J. M. Barrie in the award-winning BBC serial The Lost Boys. In 1981, he played Frodo Baggins in the BBC radio adaptation of J. R. R. Tolkien's The Lord of the Rings.

Holm's first film role to gain much notice was that of Ash, the "calm, technocratic" science officer – later revealed to be an android – in Ridley Scott's science-fiction film Alien (1979). His portrayal of the running coach Sam Mussabini in Chariots of Fire (1981) earned him a special award at the Cannes Film Festival, a BAFTA award for Best Actor in a Supporting Role, and an Academy Award nomination for Best Supporting Actor. In the 1980s, Holm played in Time Bandits (1981), Greystoke: The Legend of Tarzan, Lord of the Apes (1984) and Brazil (1985). He played Lewis Carroll, the author of Alice in Wonderland, in Dreamchild (1985).

In 1989, Holm was nominated for a BAFTA award for the television series Game, Set and Match. Based on the novels by Len Deighton, this tells the story of an intelligence officer (Holm) who finds a security leak at the heart of his network. He continued to perform Shakespeare in films. He appeared with Kenneth Branagh in Henry V (1989) and as Polonius to Mel Gibson's Hamlet (1990). Holm was reunited with Branagh in Mary Shelley's Frankenstein (1994), playing the father of Branagh's Victor Frankenstein.

Holm as Bilbo Baggins in The Lord of the Rings: The Fellowship of the Ring. The role brought him wider fame, somewhat overshadowing the rest of his acting career.

Holm raised his profile in 1997 with two prominent roles, as the priest Vito Cornelius in Luc Besson's sci-fi The Fifth Element and the lawyer Mitchell Stephens in The Sweet Hereafter. In 2001, he starred in From Hell as the physician Sir William Withey Gull. The same year, he followed up his radio role as Frodo by appearing as Frodo's older cousin Bilbo Baggins in the blockbuster film The Lord of the Rings: The Fellowship of the Ring. This brought him wider fame, somewhat overshadowing the rest of his acting career. He returned for The Lord of the Rings: The Return of the King (2003), for which he shared a SAG award for Outstanding Performance by a Cast in a Motion Picture. He later reprised his role as the elderly Bilbo Baggins in the films The Hobbit: An Unexpected Journey and The Hobbit: The Battle of the Five Armies. Martin Freeman portrayed the young Bilbo in those films.

Holm was nominated for an Emmy Award twice, for a PBS broadcast of a National Theatre production of King Lear, in 1999; and for a supporting role in the HBO film The Last of the Blonde Bombshells opposite Judi Dench, in 2001. He voiced Chef Skinner in the Pixar animated film Ratatouille (2007). He appeared in two David Cronenberg films: Naked Lunch (1991) and eXistenZ (1999). His acting was admired by Harold Pinter: the playwright once said: "He puts on my shoe, and it fits!" Holm played Lenny in both the London and New York City premieres of Pinter's The Homecoming; the BBC wrote that he "electrified audiences" in the play. He played Napoleon Bonaparte three times: in the television series Napoleon and Love (1974), Terry Gilliam's Time Bandits (1981), and The Emperor's New Clothes (2001). Holm received royal recognition for his contributions: he was made CBE in 1989 and knighted in 1998.

== Personal life ==
Holm was married four times: to Lynn Mary Shaw in 1955 (divorced 1965); to Sophie Baker in 1982 (divorced 1986); to the actress Penelope Wilton, in 1991 (divorced 2001); and to the artist Sophie de Stempel in 2003. He had five children.

Holm and Wilton appeared together in the BBC children's series The Borrowers (1993). His last wife, Sophie de Stempel, was a protégée and a life model of Lucian Freud, and an artist.

He was made a Commander of the Order of the British Empire (CBE) in 1989 by Queen Elizabeth II.

Holm was treated for prostate cancer in 2001. He was diagnosed with Parkinson's disease in 2007.

== Death ==
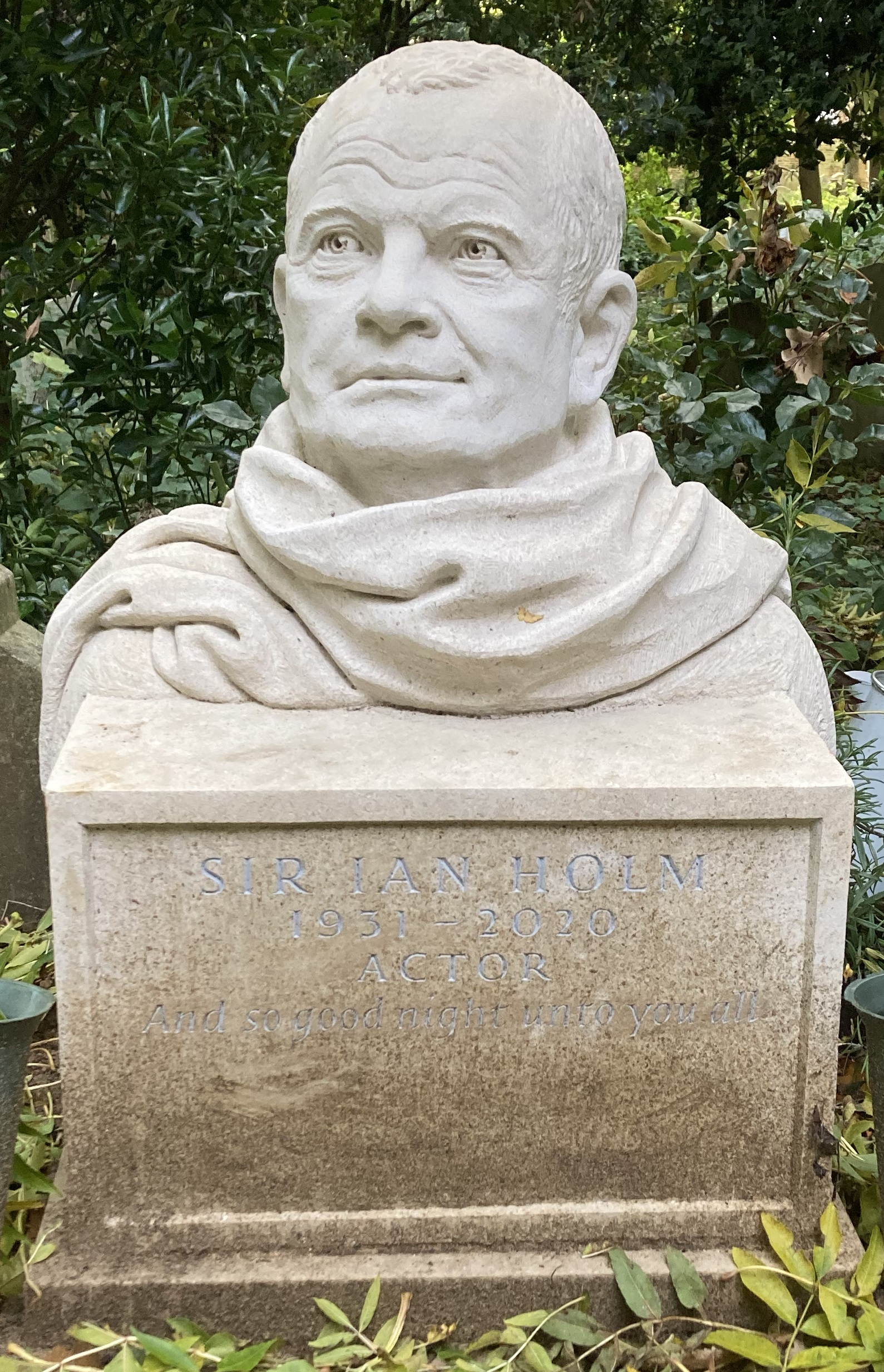
Holm's grave in Highgate Cemetery

Holm died in hospital in London on 19 June 2020 at the age of 88. According to Alex Irwin, Holm's agent, his death was related to Parkinson's disease. His remains are interred on the western side of Highgate Cemetery.

== Posthumous image use ==
For the 2024 film Alien: Romulus, the android character Rook was meant to be the same model as Ash, the character Holm played in the first Alien film in 1979. With the consent of his heirs, the depiction of Rook was created using a combination of animatronics and computer-generated imagery based on Holm's archive data, with actor Daniel Betts providing Rook's voice.

== Acting credits ==
=== Film ===
Year	Title	Role	Notes	Ref.
1968	The Bofors Gun	Flynn		
1968	The Fixer	Grubeshov		
1968	A Midsummer Night's Dream	Puck		
1969	Oh! What a Lovely War	Raymond Poincaré		
1970	A Severed Head	Martin Lynch-Gibbon		
1971	Nicholas and Alexandra	Vasily Yakovlev		
1971	Mary, Queen of Scots	David Rizzio		
1972	Young Winston	George E. Buckle		
1973	The Homecoming	Lenny		
1974	Juggernaut	Nicholas Porter		
1976	Robin and Marian	King John		
1976	Shout at the Devil	Mohammed		
1977	March or Die	El Krim		
1979	Alien	Ash		
1981	Chariots of Fire	Sam Mussabini		
1981	Time Bandits	Napoleon		
1982	The Return of the Soldier	Doctor Anderson		
1982	Inside the Third Reich	Joseph Goebbels		
1982	Helen	Man		
1984	Laughterhouse	Ben Singleton		
1984	Greystoke: The Legend of Tarzan, Lord of the Apes	Capitain Philippe D'Arnot		
1984	Terror in the Aisles	Ash		
1985	Dreamchild	Charles L. Dodgson		
1985	Wetherby	Stanley Pilborough		
1985	Brazil	Mr Kurtzmann		
1985	Dance with a Stranger	Desmond Cussen		
1985	Mr and Mrs Edgehill	Eustace Edgehill		
1988	Another Woman	Ken Post		
1989	Henry V	Fluellen		
1990	Hamlet	Polonius		
1991	Naked Lunch	Tom Frost		
1991	Kafka	Doctor Murnau		
1992	Blue Ice	Sir Hector		
1993	The Hour of the Pig	Albertus		
1994	Mary Shelley's Frankenstein	Baron Alphonse Frankenstein		
1994	The Madness of King George	Francis Willis		
1996	Big Night	Pascal		
1996	Loch Ness	Water Bailiff		
1997	Night Falls on Manhattan	Liam Casey		
1997	The Sweet Hereafter	Mitchell Stephens		
1997	The Fifth Element	Father Vito Cornelius		
1997	A Life Less Ordinary	Naville		
1997	Incognito	John	Uncredited cameo	
1998	Alice through the Looking Glass	White Knight		
1998	King Lear	Lear		
1999	Shergar	Joseph Maguire		
1999	eXistenZ	Kiri Vinokur		
1999	Simon Magus	Sirius/Boris/The Devil		
1999	Wisconsin Death Trip	Frank Cooper (voice)		
1999	The Match	Big Tam		
1999	Animal Farm	Squealer (voice)		
2000	Joe Gould's Secret	Joe Gould		
2000	The Miracle Maker	Pontius Pilate (voice)		
2000	The Last of the Blonde Bombshells	Patrick		
2000	Esther Kahn	Nathan Quellen		
2000	Beautiful Joe	George The Geek		
2000	Bless the Child	Reverend Grissom		
2001	From Hell	Sir William Gull		
2001	The Emperor's New Clothes	Napoleon / Eugene Lenormand		
2001	The Lord of the Rings: The Fellowship of the Ring	Bilbo Baggins		
2003	The Lord of the Rings: The Return of the King	Bilbo Baggins		
2004	The Day After Tomorrow	Professor Terry Rapson		
2004	Garden State	Gideon Largeman		
2004	The Aviator	Professor Fitz		
2005	Strangers with Candy	Dr Putney		
2005	Chromophobia	Edward Aylesbury		
2005	Lord of War	Simeon Weisz		
2006	Renaissance	Jonas Muller (voice)		
2006	O Jerusalem	Ben Gurion		
2006	The Treatment	Ernesto Morales		
2007	Ratatouille	Chef Skinner (voice)		
2012	The Hobbit: An Unexpected Journey	Older Bilbo Baggins		
2014	The Hobbit: The Battle of the Five Armies	Older Bilbo Baggins	Cameo; Final film role	
2024	Alien: Romulus	Rook	Voice and likeness digitally recreated	

=== Television ===
Year	Title	Role	Notes	Ref.
1965–1966	The Wars of the Roses	Richard III	2 episodes	
1972–1974	BBC Play of the Month	Khrushchov/Oedipus	2 episodes	
1974	Napoleon and Love	Napoleon I	9 episodes	
1974–1975	Benjamin Franklin	Wedderburn	3 episodes	
1975	Private Affairs	David Garrick	Episode: Mr Garrick and Mrs Woffington	
1977	The Man in the Iron Mask	Duval	Television film	
1977	Jesus of Nazareth	Zerah	Parts 1 & 2	
1977	Jubilee	Bill Ramsey	Episode: Ramsey	
1978	Do You Remember?	Walter Street	Episode: Night School	
1978	The Lost Boys	J. M. Barrie	3 episodes	
1978	Holocaust	Heinrich Himmler	2 episodes	
1978	Les Misérables	Thénardier	Television film	
1978	The Thief of Baghdad	The Gatekeeper	Television film	
1979	All Quiet on the Western Front	Himmelstoss	Television film	
1979	S.O.S. Titanic	Bruce Ismay	Television film	
1980	We, the Accused	Paul Pressett	Period drama; 5 episodes	
1980	The Misanthrope	Alceste	Television film	
1981–2008	Horizon	Narrator	Television documentary	
1982	The Bell	Michael Meade	Television drama	
1982	Play for Today	Alexie	Television play (episode: Soft Targets)	
1982	Tales of the Unexpected	Alan Corwin	Television play (episode: Death Can Add)	
1985	Television	Narrator	Television documentary series	
1986	Murder by the Book	Hercule Poirot	Television film	
1988	Game, Set and Match	Bernard Samson	13 episodes	
1989	The Tailor of Gloucester	The Tailor	Television film	
1989	The Endless Game	Control	2 episodes	
1991	Uncle Vanya	Astrov	BBC TV	
1992	The Borrowers	Pod Clock	6 episodes	
1993	The Return of the Borrowers	Pod Clock	6 episodes	
1999	Animal Farm	Squealer (voice)	Television film	
2003	Monsters We Met	Narrator	Television documentary	
2004	The Last Dragon	Narrator	Television film	
2005	The Adventures of Errol Flynn	Narrator	Television documentary	
2009	1066: The Battle for Middle Earth	Narrator	2 episodes	
2020	Scary Stories Around the Fire	Teller (voice)	2 episodes; podcast	

=== Theatre ===
Year	Title	Role	Venue	Ref.
1954–	Shakespeare plays	multiple roles	Royal Shakespeare Theatre, Stratford-upon-Avon	
1959	A Midsummer Night's Dream	Puck	Royal Shakespeare Theatre, Stratford-upon-Avon	
1959	King Lear	The Fool	Royal Shakespeare Theatre, Stratford-upon-Avon	
1962	Troilus and Cressida	Troilus	Aldwych Theatre, London	
1965	Henry V	Henry V	Aldwych Theatre, London	
1966	Twelfth Night	Malvolio	Royal Shakespeare Theatre, Stratford-upon-Avon	
1967	Romeo and Juliet	Romeo	Royal Shakespeare Theatre, Stratford-upon-Avon	
1967	The Homecoming	Lenny	Music Box Theatre, Broadway	
1997	King Lear	Lear	Cottesloe Theatre, London	

== Honours and accolades ==
- 1989: Commander of the Order of the British Empire (CBE) in the 1989 Birthday Honours.
- 1998: Knighted in the 1998 Birthday Honours for services to drama.

== Bibliography ==
- Holm, Ian; Jacobi, Steven (2004). Acting My Life. London: Bantam Press. ISBN 978-0-593-05214-3. OCLC 56647423.
