= The Woman and the Stranger =

1985 film

- Directed by: Rainer Simon
- Written by: Rainer Simon
- Produced by: DEFA-Studio; (Potsdam-Babelsberg)
- Starring: Kathrin Waligura; Siegfried Höchst; Joachim Lätsch; Katrin Knappe
- Release dates: 31 January 1985 (East Germany); February 1985 (BIFF)
- Running time: 98 minutes
- Country: East Germany
- Language: German

The Woman and the Stranger (German: Die Frau und der Fremde) is a 1985 East German film directed by Rainer Simon. It is based on Leonhard Frank's novella "Karl und Anna" and tells the story of two friends in a POW camp during World War I. One of them escapes and forms a relationship with the other man's wife. After the war her husband returns. The film was entered into the 35th Berlin International Film Festival, where it won the Golden Bear.

It is a remake of Homecoming (1928).

== Cast ==
- Joachim Lätsch as Karl
- Peter Zimmermann as Richard
- Kathrin Waligura as Anna
- Christine Schorn as Trude
- Siegfried Höchst as Horst
- Hans-Uwe Bauer as Verwirrter Soldat
- Katrin Knappe as Marie
- Ulrich Mühe as Revolutionär
- Herbert Sand as Kriegsinvalide
- Daniel Fries as Trudes kleiner Sohn
- Roman-Eckhard Galonska as Nachbar
- Mirko Haninger as Soldat am Fenster
- Reiner Heise as Deutscher Gefangener
- Rita Hirschberger as Elfie
