= Der Prozeß wird vertagt =

1958 film

- Directed by: Herbert Ballmann
- Based on: Michaels Rückkehr by Leonhard Frank
- Starring: Gisela Uhlen
- Release date: 1958
- Country: East Germany
- Language: German

Der Prozeß wird vertagt is an East German film. It was released in 1958.
