= Bernard Werber =

French writer (born 1961)

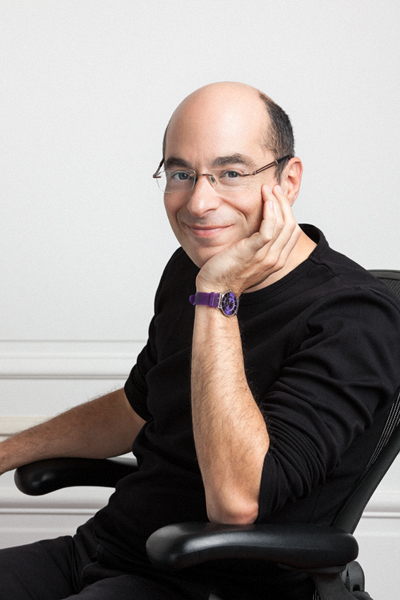
- Werber by Michel Restany in February 2013.
- Born: 18 September 1961 (age 64); Toulouse, France
- Occupations: Journalist (1983–1990), writer

Bernard Werber (born 18 September 1961 in Toulouse) is a French science fiction writer, active since the 1990s. He is chiefly recognized for having written the trilogy Les Fourmis, the only one of his novels to have been published in English. This series weaves together philosophy, spirituality, science fiction, thriller, science, mythology and consciousness.

== Writing style ==
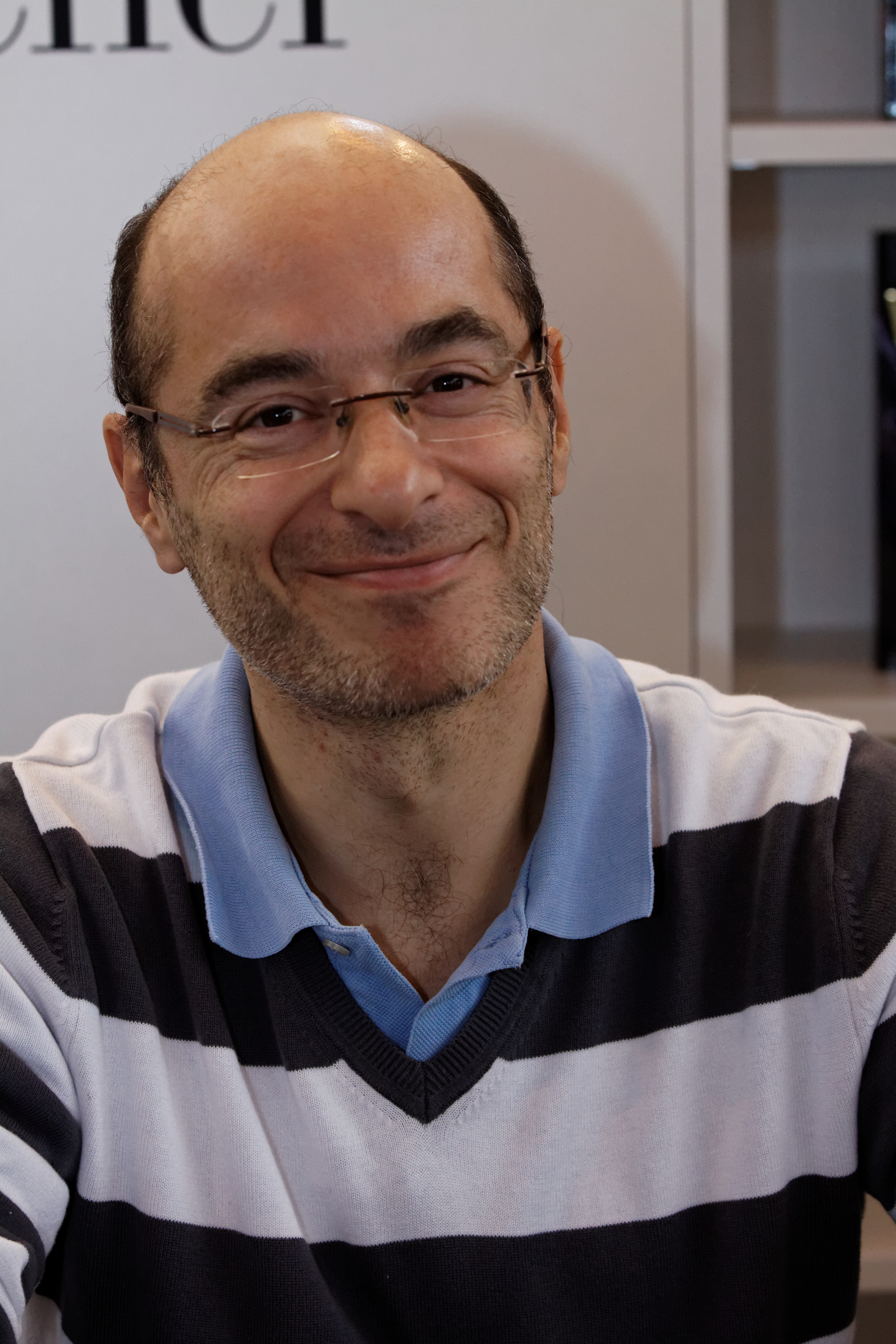
Bernard Werber at the Salon du livre de Paris in March 2012.

Werber's writing style mixes literary genres, including saga, science fiction and philosophical ideas. Most of his novels have the same format, alternating between prose and encyclopedic passages that expand upon the ideas in the former. Many of Werber's novels are also connected by common characters, story threads and themes. For example, the character Edmond Wells appears both in the trilogy Les Fourmis (The Ants), the novel L'Empire des anges (The Empire of the Angels), and the novel Nous Les Dieux (We the Gods).

== Literary themes ==
Werber's books anthropomorphize animals including dolphins, rats and ants. He also uses characters symbolically to reflect "the stage of the evolution of the soul". In addition, he defends the vision of a collectivist global government that acts as the "world police" and that imposes strict birth control.

Werber is a member of the Institute for Research on Extraordinary Experiences (IREE), an association that promotes the acknowledgement of extraordinary or unusual experiences. This is reflected in his novels that incorporate science, the paranormal and spirituality as prominent themes including Thanatonautes (The Thanatonauts), which proposes a spiritualist version of near death experiences and afterlife; L'Empire des Anges (The Empire of the Angels) and Le Mystère des Dieux (The Mystery of the Gods), which describe a connection between souls, angels and gods; and Nos amis les Terriens (Our Earthmen Friends), which describes alien abductions.

== Works ==
=== The Ants trilogy (Les Fourmis trilogy) ===
- Les Fourmis, Prix des lecteurs de Sciences et Avenir, 1991, ISBN 2-226-05257-7. (lit. The Ants, translated into English as Empire of the Ants).
- Le Jour des fourmis, 1992, ISBN 2-226-06118-5 (lit. The Day of the Ants)
- La Révolution des fourmis, 1996, ISBN 2-226-08636-6 (lit. The Revolution of the Ants)

=== The "Angels" cycle ===
- Les Thanatonautes, 1994, ISBN 2-226-06758-2 (lit. The Thanatonauts)
- L'Empire des Anges, 2000, ISBN 2-226-11526-9 (lit. The Empire of the Angels)

=== The "Gods" cycle (follow-up of the cycle of "Angels") ===
- Nous les dieux, 2004, ISBN 2-226-15498-1 (lit. We, the Gods)
- Le Souffle des dieux (roman), 2005, ISBN 2-226-16807-9 (lit. The Breath of the Gods)
- Le Mystère des dieux, 2007, ISBN 2-226-17979-8 (lit. The Mystery of the Gods)

=== The "Explorers of science" cycle ===
- Le père de nos pères, 1998, ISBN 2-226-10562-X (lit. The Father of our Fathers)
- L'ultime secret, 2001, ISBN 2-226-12740-2 (lit. The Ultimate Secret)
- Le rire du Cyclope, 2010, ISBN 2-226-21529-8 (lit. The Laughter of the Cyclops)

=== Third Humanity cycle ===
- Troisième Humanité, 2012, (lit. Third Humanity)
- Les micro-humains, 2013, (lit. The micro-humans)
- La Voix de la Terre, 2014, (lit. The Voice of the Earth)

=== Other novels ===
- Le papillon des étoiles, 2006, ISBN 2-226-17349-8 (lit. The Butterfly of the Stars)
- Le miroir de Cassandre, 2009, ISBN 2-226-19402-9 (lit. The Mirror of Cassandra)
- Demain les chats, 2016 (lit. Tomorrow the cats)
- Depuis l'au-delà, 2017 (lit. From Beyond)
- La Boîte de Pandore (roman), 2018 (lit. Pandora's Box)
- Sa Majesté des chats, 2019
- La Diagonale des Reines, 2022
- Le Temps des Chimères, 2023

=== Experimental books ===
- L'Encyclopédie du savoir relatif et absolu, 1993, ISBN 2-226-06583-0 (lit. The Encyclopedia of Relative and Absolute Knowledge)
- Le Livre du Voyage, 1997, ISBN 2-226-09445-8 (lit. The Book of Travel)
- Le Livre secret des Fourmis, 2002 (lit. The Secret Book of the Ants)
- Nos amis, les humains, 2003 (lit. Our Friends, the Humans)
- Nouvelle Encyclopédie du savoir relatif et absolu, 2009 (lit. New Encyclopedia of Relative and Absolute Knowledge)
- Voyage au cœur du vivant, 2011 (lit. Journey within the Living)

=== Short-story Collections ===
- L'Arbre des possibles, 2002, ISBN 2-226-13459-X (lit. The Tree of Possibles)
- Paradis sur mesure, 2008, ISBN 9782226188502 (lit. Custom Paradise(s))

=== Comics ===
==== Exit ====
Amandine is a journalist, working for a video game magazine. One day, she gets fired, finds her boyfriend with another woman, and contemplates suicide. She finds a mysterious website, advocating an underground group named Exit, which advocates a kind of murder game: By killing someone who wishes to die, another member will try to kill you.

Individual issues

1. Bernard Werber (text) et Alain Mounier (art), Exit [Tome 1], éditions Albin Michel, Paris, 1999, 45 p., ISBN 2-226-10451-8, BnF 36977736t. — renamed Contact in collections published since 2003.
2. Bernard Werber (text) and Alain Mounier (art), Le Deuxième Cercle (lit. the second circle) [Tome 2], éditions Albin Michel, Paris, 2000, 43 p., ISBN 2-226-11474-2, BnF 371148466.
3. Bernard Werber (text) and Éric Puech (art), Jusqu'au dernier souffle (lit. until the last breath) [Tome 3], éditions Albin Michel, Paris, 2000, 44 p., ISBN 2-226-12542-6, BnF 388913761.

Collections

- Bernard Werber (text), Alain Mounier et Éric Puech (art), Exit [no mention of colourists] colourized by Walter Pezzali and Sophie Dumas, pour les couleurs), éditions Albin Michel, [no series name], Paris, 2003, 45-43-47 p., ISBN 2-226-14413-7, BnF 391173297.
- Bernard Werber (text), Alain Mounier et Éric Puech (art), Exit (with Walter Pezzali an Sophie Dumas, colourists), éditions Albin Michel, coll. « Les Intégrales », Paris, 2008, 141 p., ISBN 978-2-35626-108-3, BnF 41425210s.

==== Other works ====
- Les Enfants d'Ève, May 2005 (lit. The Children of Eve)

=== Films ===
- La Reine de nacre (short, 15'), 2001 (lit. The Mother-of-pearl Queen)
- Les Humains (short, 9'), 2003 (lit. The Humans)
- Nos amis les Terriens (full length), produced by Claude Lelouch, 2007 (lit. Our Friends, the Earthlings)

=== Theatre ===
- Nos amis les humains, 2003, ISBN 2-226-13793-9, produced in 2004 by Jean-Christophe Barc with Audrey Dana and Jean-Christophe Barc
- Bienvenue au paradis, 2011, produced in 2011 by Jean-Christophe Barc with Thierry Liagre

== Lectures ==
- 2013-11-17, at Kyung Hee University in Seoul, Korea. "Different perspective to look at human"
