= Nicht schummeln, Liebling! =

- Film poster
- Directed by: Joachim Hasler
- Written by: Rudi Strahl
- Starring: Chris Doerk; Frank Schöbel
- Music by: Gerd Natschinski
- Production company: DEFA
- Release date: 1973
- Running time: 92 minutes
- Country: East Germany
- Language: German

Nicht schummeln, Liebling! (English: Don't Cheat, Darling!) is a 1973 East German musical comedy film directed by Joachim Hasler and produced by the state-owned studio DEFA. The film stars Chris Doerk and Frank Schöbel, two of the most popular musical performers in East Germany.

== Plot ==
The mayor of the small town of Sonnethal wants to make his town famous by getting its football team into the district league. The school principal, Dr. Barbara Schwalbe, wants to stop the one-sided focus and build a youth club, so decides to found her own women's football team which quickly outshines the boys. Conflict then arises between the mayor and Dr. Schwalbe, and between team captains Brigitte and Berndt, though both become couples in the end.

== Cast ==
- Chris Doerk as Brigitte
- Frank Schöbel as Berndt
- Dorit Gäbler as Dr. Barbara Schwalbe
- Karel Fiala as the Mayor
- Christel Bodenstein as Lise Bredemeier, City Councilor for Trade
- Rolf Herricht as Eduard Groß, Cultural Councilor

== See also ==
- Cinema of East Germany
- List of East German films
- Heißer Sommer, another film starring Doerk and Schöbel
