= Dual-clutch transmission =

Type of vehicle transmission

Schematic of a DCT (using two identical clutches located on the axis of the flywheel)

A dual-clutch transmission (DCT) (sometimes referred to as a twin-clutch transmission) is a type of multi-speed vehicle transmission system, that uses two separate clutches for odd and even gear sets. The design is often similar to two separate manual transmissions with their respective clutches contained within one housing, and working as one unit. In car and truck applications, the DCT functions as an automatic transmission, requiring no driver input to change gears.

The first DCT to reach production was the Easidrive automatic transmission introduced on the 1961 Hillman Minx mid-size car. This was followed by various eastern European tractors through the 1970s (using manual operation via a single clutch pedal), then the Porsche 962 C racing car in 1985. The first DCT of the modern era was used in the 2003 Volkswagen Golf R32. Since the late 2000s, DCTs have become increasingly widespread, and have supplanted hydraulic automatic transmissions in various models of cars.

More generally, a transmission with several clutches can be called a multi clutch transmission. For example, the Koenigsegg Jesko has a transmission with one clutch per gear, making for a total of 7 clutches.

== Design ==
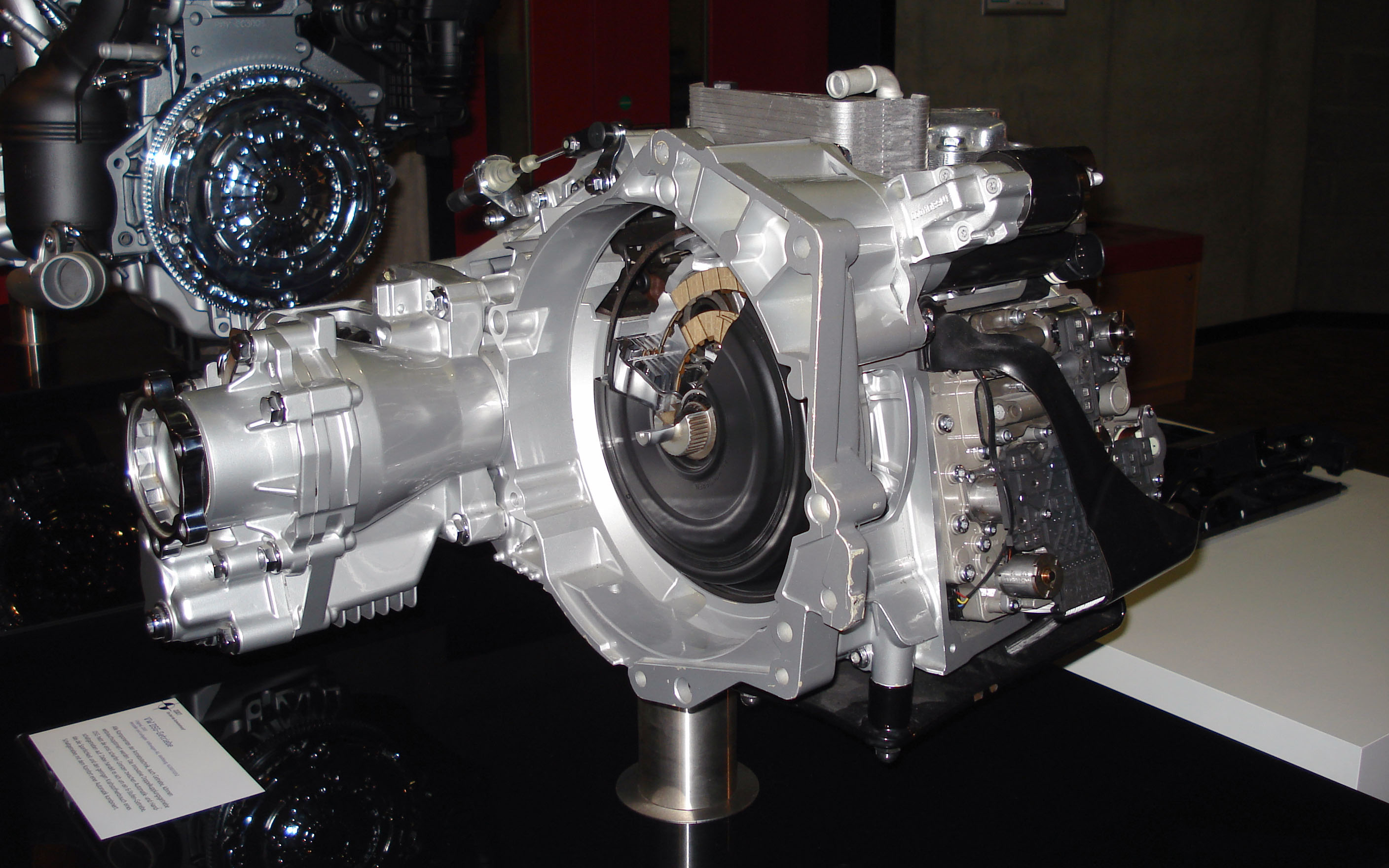
DCT based on a concentric clutch layout (inside the round black cover, shown in the center of the image)

The fundamental principle of a DCT is that one clutch drives a gear-set for the even-numbered gears, while the other clutch drives the odd-numbered gears. Since the DCT can pre-select an odd gear while the vehicle is being propelled in an even gear (or vice versa), DCTs can shift several times faster than is possible with a manual transmission. By timing the operation of one clutch to engage at the precise moment that the other is disengaging, a DCT can shift gears without interrupting the torque supply to the wheels.

A DCT uses clutch packs (as per a manual transmission), rather than the torque converter used by traditional (hydraulic) automatic transmissions. The DCT clutches are either "wet" or "dry" and are similar to the clutches used in most motorcycles. Wet-clutches are bathed in oil to provide cooling for the clutch surface, therefore wet-clutches are often used in applications with higher torque loads, such as the 1,250 N⋅m (922 lbf⋅ft) engine in the Bugatti Veyron.

Several arrangements for the two clutches are possible, and are outlined below:

- Most automotive DCTs use two concentric clutch packs located on the same axis as the flywheel. Therefore, the outer clutch pack has a larger diameter than the inner clutch pack.
- Many DCTs for tractors (such as the Fortschritt ZT 320) use a similar arrangement where the clutches are located on the same axis of the flywheel. The difference is that the clutches are at different positions on this axis (i.e. one in front of the other) and the same size as each other. This design is used by the Tremec TR-9070 DCT used by the 2020 Ford Mustang Shelby GT500.
- Another design (as used by the Volkswagen DQ200 transmission) arranges two identical-size clutches located side-by-side. This design requires two side-by-side input shafts, which are driven from the crankshaft via gears.

== History ==
Schematic diagram of a type of dual-clutch gearbox: M: Motor; A: Primary drive and driving shaft; B: Dual clutch; C: Driven shaft; D: Layshaft, hollow, even gears; E: Layshaft, odd gears; F: Output

The concept of a dual-clutch transmission was invented by French engineer Adolphe Kégresse in 1939. The transmission was intended for use in the Citroën Traction Avant, however Kégresse ran out of money before a working model could be developed.

One of the first production DCTs was the Easidrive unit developed in the late 1950s by United Kingdom's Smiths Industries and Rootes. This DCT – introduced on the 1961 Hillman Minx (Series IIIC) – used two electro-magnetic clutches, along with analogue electronics and a series of solenoids to implement the gear shifts. The Easidrive was offered as an option on Hillman and Singer models, but it was not a reliable device and many were replaced by conventional manual transmissions.

Porsche began development of DCTs for racing cars in the late 1970s, due to the possibility of a DCT preventing a drop in boost during gear shifts on a turbocharged engine. As the electronics required to control the transmission became compact enough to be practical, the Porsche Doppelkupplungsgetriebe ('dual-clutch gearbox') (PDK) transmission was installed as a prototype in a Porsche 956 Le Mans racing car in 1983. The first use of a PDK in competition was the 1985 Porsche 962 C Le Mans racing car, which won the World Sportscar Championship in 1986. The PDK transmission was also used in the 1985 Audi Sport Quattro S1 Group B rally car.

The first mass-production passenger car to use a DCT was the 2003 Volkswagen Golf R32.

== Manufacturers ==
BorgWarner

BorgWarner produced the first mass-production DCT, as used in the R32 model introduced to the Volkswagen Golf range in 2003. The company have produced many of the DCTs used by the Volkswagen Group (marketed as DSG for Volkswagen-branded cars) and produced various components for the 2007 Nissan GT-R sports car, an early application for DCTs involving high torque loads. The company supplies several car manufacturers with complete transmission units, wet-clutches and/or mechatronic control modules.

Getrag

Getrag began production of DCTs in 2008 and has supplied manufacturers including BMW, Dacia, Dodge, Ferrari, Mercedes-Benz, Ford, Mitsubishi, Renault, Smart and Volvo. The Getrag 7DCL750 is a 7-speed DCT which is designed for high-performance engines and has a torque rating of 750 N⋅m (553 lbf⋅ft). It is used in mid-engined sports cars such as the 2009 Ferrari 458, the 2014 Mercedes-AMG GT and the 2017 Ford GT.

Honda

Honda manufactures DCTs for some Honda motorcycles as of 2024, and was the first to add a DCT to motorcycles. Honda also previously manufactured DCTs for some Acura cars.

HYUNDAI TRANSYS

HYUNDAI TRANSYS manufactures dry 7-speed and wet 8-speed DCTs as of 2024. The DCTs are used in some Hyundai and Kia (e.g. Ceed) vehicles.

LuK

LuK DCTs have been used by Volkswagen Group since 2008, in several smaller cars with relatively low torque outputs.

Ricardo

Ricardo designed and built 7-speed DCT used by the 2005-2015 Bugatti Veyron, which has a turbocharged 16-cylinder engine producing 1,250 N⋅m (922 lbf⋅ft) of torque, as well as the Bugatti Chiron.

Stellantis

Stellantis manufactures the electrified dual-clutch transmission (eDCT) at the Mirafiori Automotive Park in Italy as of 2024.

Tremec

Tremec provides the 8-speed DCT used in the 2020 Chevrolet Corvette C8 and the 7-speed DCT used in the 2020 Ford Mustang Shelby GT500.

ZF Friedrichshafen

ZF Friedrichshafen produce the 7-speed DCT used by Porsche (marketed as PDK).

== Use in motor vehicles ==
Following its 2003 introduction in the Volkswagen Golf R32, a 6-speed DCT (model code DQ250), with two wet-clutches arranged concentrically, has been used in several Volkswagen and Audi models. In 2008, Volkswagen group began production of the DQ200, a 7-speed DCT using two dry-clutches arranged side-by-side (instead of concentrically). Volkswagen claims fuel economy improvements of 6% compared with a 6-speed manual and 20% compared with a traditional (hydraulic) automatic transmission. DCT transmissions have been used on vehicles sold by Alfa Romeo, Volkswagen, Audi, Tata Motors, SEAT, Skoda, and Bugatti, mostly marketed using the term Direct-Shift Gearbox (except for Alfa Romeo, which has used the term TCT, also Tata Motors uses the term DCA (Dual Clutch Automatic) and Audi, which has also used the term S-Tronic).

Usage in high performance cars began in 2005 with the 7-speed DCT used in the Bugatti Veyron. Other early high performance applications include the 2007 Nissan GT-R, the 2008 Ferrari California, the 2008 Mitsubishi Lancer Evolution X and the 2009 Porsche 911 (997).

The 2009 Honda VFR1200F is the first motorcycle to use a DCT. Honda has since expanded the application of the DCT to the Gold Wing model (model year 2018), the Africa Twin, the NT1100, Rebel 1100, and the NC700XD (model year 2012).

In 2010, the Mitsubishi Fuso 6-speed Duonic transmission became the first DCT to be used in a truck.

The 2015 Acura TLX uses a torque converter (a device typically used in hydraulic automatic transmissions) paired with its 8-speed DCT. The purpose of the torque converter is to improve the smoothness of low-speed driving, through the elimination of jolting and shuddering sometimes found in DCTs at low speed.

== Use in tractors ==
Several 1970s tractors from eastern European countries (such as the Kirovets K-700 derivatives) used manually operated DCTs. For example, the Fortschritt ZT 300 has an Unterlastschaltstufe ('shifting under load') function, which needs to be pre-selected by the driver and then activated by pressing the clutch halfway down. This engages the second clutch, which applies a reduction gear to the driven wheels without any interruption in the torque transmission to the wheels.

== See also ==
- Fuel economy in automobiles
- Power band
- Shift time
- Media related to dual-clutch transmission at Wikimedia Commons
