= Hot Summer =

Hot Summer may refer to:

- Hot Summer (album), a 1988 album by Leslie Cheung
- Hot Summer, re-release of f(x) album Pinocchio
- Hot Summer (film), a 1968 East German musical film
- "Hot Summer" (song), a 2007 song by Monrose
- Hot Summer of 1975, a period of instability in Portuguese history
