= Fortschritt ZT 320 =

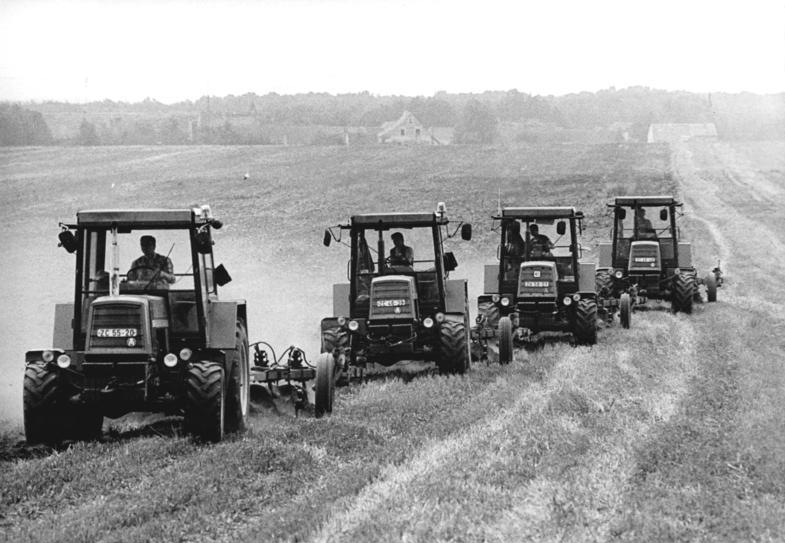
- ZT 323 tractors with harrows
- Type: Agricultural
- Manufacturer: Traktorenwerk Schönebeck
- Production: 1983–1990
- Length: 4935 mm
- Width: 2320 mm (excluding mirrors)
- Height: 3010 mm (including exhaust)
- Weight: 4980 kg (ZT 320); 5650 kg (ZT 323)
- Propulsion: Tyres
- Engine model: 4 VD 14,5/12-1 SRW
- Flywheel power: 74 kW
- Drawbar pull: up to 30 kN (ZT 320, 28 % wheelspin); up to 34 kN (ZT 323, 28 % wheelspin); Jump to: ZT 320/323 drawbar pull graph
- Speed: 1.41–30.69 km/h
- Preceded by: Fortschritt ZT 300

Fortschritt ZT 320 is a series of agricultural tractors made by the East German manufacturer VEB Traktorenwerk Schönebeck. It was produced from 1983 to 1990, and succeeded the ZT 300 series. Unlike its predecessor, the ZT 320 series came in only two models, the rear-wheel drive ZT 320, and the all-wheel drive ZT 323.

== Concept ==
The ZT 320 series was meant to be an upgrade of the existing ZT 300 series, and therefore, many at the time not obsolete ZT 300 components, like the axles, frame, and steering system, were carried over to the ZT 320 series. The main parts that were supposed to receive an upgrade were, amongst other things, the three-point linkage, powertrain, driver's cab, and to fulfill contemporary regulations, the braking system. Compared to the ZT 300 series, the ZT 320 was also designed to be much more versatile. With its upgraded braking system, it can pull trailers with a mass of up to 30,000 kg, and its enhanced gearbox allows a very low speed of only 1.4 km/h. The production was simplified by reducing the number of models to two: The ZT 320 is the rear-wheel drive only model, whereas the ZT 323 also has front-wheel drive. Special purpose models were not part of the ZT 320 series.

== Technical description ==
The ZT 320 series is a wheeled, two-axle tractor based upon the half frame design principle. Like any mid 20th century standard tractor, the ZT 320 series has an unsprung, rear beam axle that is directly flange-mounted to the gearbox. The rear axle is also directly connected to an additional ladder frame without any spring elements or shock absorbers in between. This ladder frame, the so-called half-frame, offers high torsional stiffness, and supports the engine as well as the driver's cab. In front, it connects to the front axle, which is either a pivoted but otherwise unsprung rigid dead (ZT 320) or live (ZT 323) axle. The rear axle differential, as well as the central differential, and the front axle differential (ZT 323 only) are lockable; the differential locks are operated pneumatically. The ZT 320 series has 18.4/15−34 rear tyres and either a single circuit (ZT 320) or dual circuit (ZT 323) braking system with drum brakes.

A hydraulically operated DK 80 dual clutch transmits the torque from the engine to the gearbox. Like its predecessor, the ZT 320 series has a powershift gearbox with three ranges, but the number of gears was upgraded from three to four. Powershifting is activated pneumatically, and can be operated with a switch on the dashboard. In total, the gearbox has 12 forward, and 8 reverse gears. At input torque greater than 250 N·m, the ZT 320's gearbox can reach an efficiency of more than 90% (range I, gear 4). The tractor's rear PTO shaft can be switched and has two settings: 540 min^{−1}, (up to 56 kW), and 1000 min^{−1}, (up to 67 kW). It also comes with a safety system that prevents transmitting too much power to farm implements. The ZT 320 model was available with an additional front PTO as a factory option.

Gearbox characteristics
Speed in km/h at engine speed 1800 min^{−1}
Range	Gear	forward	reverse	PS (fw)	PS (rv)
I	1	1.83	1.89	1.41	1.45
I	2	3.21	3.32	2.47	2.55
I	3	5.01	5.18	3.85	3.98
I	4	7.94	8.21	6.10	6.31
II	1	2.27	2.35	1.75	1.81
II	2	3.99	4.13	3.41	3.18
II	3	6.23	6.45	4.79	4.99
II	4	9.88	10.22	7.60	7.86
III	1	7.07		5.44	
III	2	12.14		9.55	
III	3	19.36		14.89	
III	4	30.69		23.61	
Source					

A standard IFA 4 VD 14,5/12-1 SRW diesel engine, which was also used in the ZT 300 series, powers the ZT 320 series tractors. The 4 VD 14,5/12-1 SRW is a naturally aspirated, straight-four, water-cooled, diesel engine, that features MAN M-System wall-guided direct injection. It displaces 6.56 dm^{3} and is rated 73.5 kW at 1800 min^{−1}. To reduce fuel consumption compared to the ZT 300 version, it received inlet ports with enhanced sickle-shaped chamfers, an optimised camshaft, and new fuel injectors. These measures resulted in a 2.9% reduction in fuel consumption, as well as better exhaust gas behaviour, and enhanced engine-torque increase. A reduction in engine noise was achieved by finning the valve covers, and making the cylinder-head cover of cast iron.

The driver's cab is mounted on the half-frame using special rubber shock-and-vibration absorbers. The interior is designed ergonomically, with an air-sprung driver's seat, well-placed levers and switches, and an adjustable steering column. Despite having a huge window area of 4.6 m^{2}, the cab includes a roll cage. A ventilation system with slightly increased cabin pressure prevents dust from entering the driver's cab. Sound-deadening measures were used to keep the sound pressure level inside the cab below 85 dB.

== Technical specifications ==
Technical specifications
	ZT 320	ZT 323
Engine
Engine type	4 VD 14,5/12-1 SRW	
Operating principle	Straight-four, four-stroke, diesel engine, M-System direct injection, water-cooled	
Bore × Stroke, Displacement	120 × 145 mm, 6.56 dm^{3}	
Rated power	73.5 kW at 1800 min^{−1}	
Max. torque	422 N·m at 1350 min^{−1}	
Specific fuel consumption	237 g/kWh	
Powertrain
Layout	Front engine, rear-wheel drive	Front engine, all-wheel drive
Tyres	front: 10-20 MPT, 8 PR rear: 18.4-34 AS, 14 PR	front: 16-20 MPT rear: 18.4-34 AS
Twin tyres	13.6-38 AS	
Clutch	Dual clutch DK 80	
Gearbox	Non-synchromesh, four-speed powershift gearbox with three ranges	
PTO	Single or dual PTO(s), 540 min^{−1}/1000 min^{−1}	Rear PTO, 540 min^{−1}/1000 min^{−1}
Three-point linkage	Three-point linkage, 16 MPa operating pressure Lift force 4,000 kp (39.2 kN)	
Measurements
Length	4650 mm	
Width	2120 mm	2240 mm
Height	2865 mm	
Wheelbase	2800 mm	
Track width	front: 1525–1650 mm rear: 1650–2000 mm	
Turning radius	with steering brake: 5035 mm without steering brake: 5690 mm	
ground clearance	475 mm	350 mm
Mass	4980 kg	5650 kg
Max. permissible trailer mass	30,000 kg	
Electrical system
Generator	AC generator, 28 V, 30 A	
Battery	2 × Lead-acid battery, 12 V	
System voltage	24 V	
Source		

== Drawbar pull ==
Drawbar pull (%) by wheelspin (kN). Source: View chart definition.
