= Aurora Lacasa =

French singer (born 1947)

- Born: 24 March 1947 (age 78); Paris, France
- Occupation: Popular singer
- Spouse(s): Thomas Lück (1970); Frank Schöbel; Jürgen Krajewski
- Children: Dominique Lacasa (1976); Odette (1978)
- Parent(s): Pilar & Ernesto Lacasa
- Website: Aurora Lacasa's official website

Aurora Lacasa (born Paris 24 March 1947) is a popular singer of Aragonese (Spanish) provenance who has made most of her professional career in the German Democratic Republic and, since 1989, in Germany.

== Life ==
=== Early years ===
Aurora Lacasa was born in Paris. Her parents were both journalists, and at the time of Aurora's birth the family were among the thousands of politically active Spanish intellectuals who had fled to France from Spain to escape from the violent predations of the Francoist regime, now in power following their victory in the Spanish Civil War. However, in 1948 the Lacasa family relocated again, this time from France to Hungary.

The family settled in Budapest where Aurora attended school between 1951 and 1956. Although the 1956 Hungarian uprising is remembered as a nationwide revolt, the fighting and the associated dangers were particularly intense in and around Budapest. In Budapest Ernesto Lacasa had become involved with the World Federation of Democratic Youth: as the Soviet tanks appeared on the Hungarian city streets Ernesto Lacasa, fearing for their safety, moved his family again, this time to the recently created German Democratic Republic. They ended up, initially, in Ziegenhals, just outside Berlin, moving later to the Pankow district of Berlin. Aurora, now aged 9, resumed her schooling, successfully completing her final school exams after her transition into the German education system.

"I was a simultaneous translator, and I bought W-50 trucks for Cuba."

"Ich war Dolmetscherin und kaufte für Kuba W50-Lastwagen."

Aurora Lacasa as quoted in 2010

Aurora remained in Berlin and undertook an apprenticeship in mechanical engineering with the VEB Bergmann-Borsig turbine and generator manufacturer. This gave her insights into heavy engineering which would find an unexpected use when she later undertook translation work. By the end of the 1960s she was working as a simultaneous translator between German, French and Spanish, also working for the Cuban embassy in Berlin. Cuba had been under a trade embargo from western industrial countries since 1960, which provided rich commercial pickings for industrial countries, such as East Germany, not allied with the United States. Lacasa's translation job with the embassy placed her at the heart of important negotiations for the supply of modern machinery and vehicles, including trucks, to Cuba.

=== The Big Break ===
In 1968 Aurora's mother, Pilar Lacasa was involved in preparations for the World Festival of Youth and Students, held that year in Sofia. On the train from Berlin she fell into conversation with members of Oktoberklub, a left-leaning politically engaged East German music group then at the height of their success. Pilar Lacasa mentioned that she had two children who could sing This turned out to be the beginning of Aurora Lacasa's first contact with the mainstream popular music scene in East Germany, and at the end of the same year Aurora was able to participate as a singer at an International Youth Camp held at Prenden (Wandlitz), just outside Berlin. Her performances of songs from the Spanish Civil War and her musical settings from Lorca's poems impressed her young audience. The circumstances of Lorca's death in 1936 also made him a hero for the East German arts and culture establishment. Aurora Lacasa, who still counts Lorca among her favourite writers, found herself "talent spotted". With support from the GDR Broadcasting Corporation's youth radio programme, DT64, Lacasa was offered and accepted a training place as a singer at the National Studio for Entertainment Arts.

Discography

Aurora Lacasa has issued three LPs, many music singles and, since 1990, at least three CDs. Taken together there have been something like three million discs sold. Among the most successful have been:

- Weihnachten in Familie (1985 – LP)
- Geh so wie du kamst
- Immer wieder diese Liebe
- Peterchens Mondfahrt, 1 und 2 (LPs)
- Nimm den Zug, der Sehnsucht heißt
- Adieu Papa
- Maria
- Susani
- Bring ihn mir wieder, Wind
- Still, still, still
- Kommt herein und setzt euch nieder
- In Bethlehem
- Das kann nur Liebe sein
- Alles Gute im Leben
- Er war mein Freund
- Hier wo das Meer zu Ende ist
- Guten Abend hier bin ich
- Wenn die Wandervögel ziehn (2000)
- Lebenslinien (2005)
- Weihnachten in Frieden (2009)

=== Training and success as a singer ===
While training, Aurora Lacasa got to know fellow artists such as Wolfgang Ziegler and Barbara Thalheim. Lacasa's own repertoire soon connected with audiences, and she regularly appeared on the long-running television variety show, "Ein Kessel Buntes". She also appeared in galas at Berlins's Friedrichstadt-Palast (review theatre), in other television shows such as "Weihnachten in Familie" (1985) and "Lutz und Liebe", and in live events across the country. Hit songs included titles such as "Das kann doch nur Liebe sein" ("It really can only be love") (with Thomas Lück) and "Wenn die Wandervögel ziehn" ("If the migrating bird calls"). The recording of "Weihnachten in Familie", created by Lacasa and her second husband, Frank Schöbel, and released as an LP in 1985, became East Germany's top selling disc. Singing tours abroad followed, taking in the Soviet Union, Cuba, Bulgaria, France, Portugal and the Middle East.

Although her international singing career originally blossomed in the German Democratic Republic, she enjoyed continuing success after reunification. Her more recent television appearances have nevertheless increasingly been restricted to "Christmas Spectaculars" for which, in recent years, she has been accompanied by a band of younger South American Musicians. In 2009 she was on the road again with her "Spurensuche" ("Looking for the way") solo programme, now incorporating some lighter songs, and not concentrated just on the exuberant Schlager music with which she first built her television career. However, the attention of music fans has begun to focus increasingly on the singing career of her daughter, Dominique Lacasa.

== Personal ==
Aurora Lacasa has a brother, Ernesto, with whom she has also performed as a singer.

Aurora Lacasa's first marriage, in the mid-1970s was to the singer Thomas Lück. Towards the end of the twentieth century she married, secondly, her partner, the singer Frank Schöbel. More recently she has had a house built with her manager-partner Jürgen Krajewski, to whom some sources indicate she is now married.

After breaking with Frank Schöbel Lacasa lived for some time in an apartment in down-town Berlin. She then, during the early years of the twenty-first century, spent some years living in Spain to care for her parents, before returning to live in Prenden, in the countryside outside Berlin.
