= Dominique Lacasa =

German singer (born 1976)

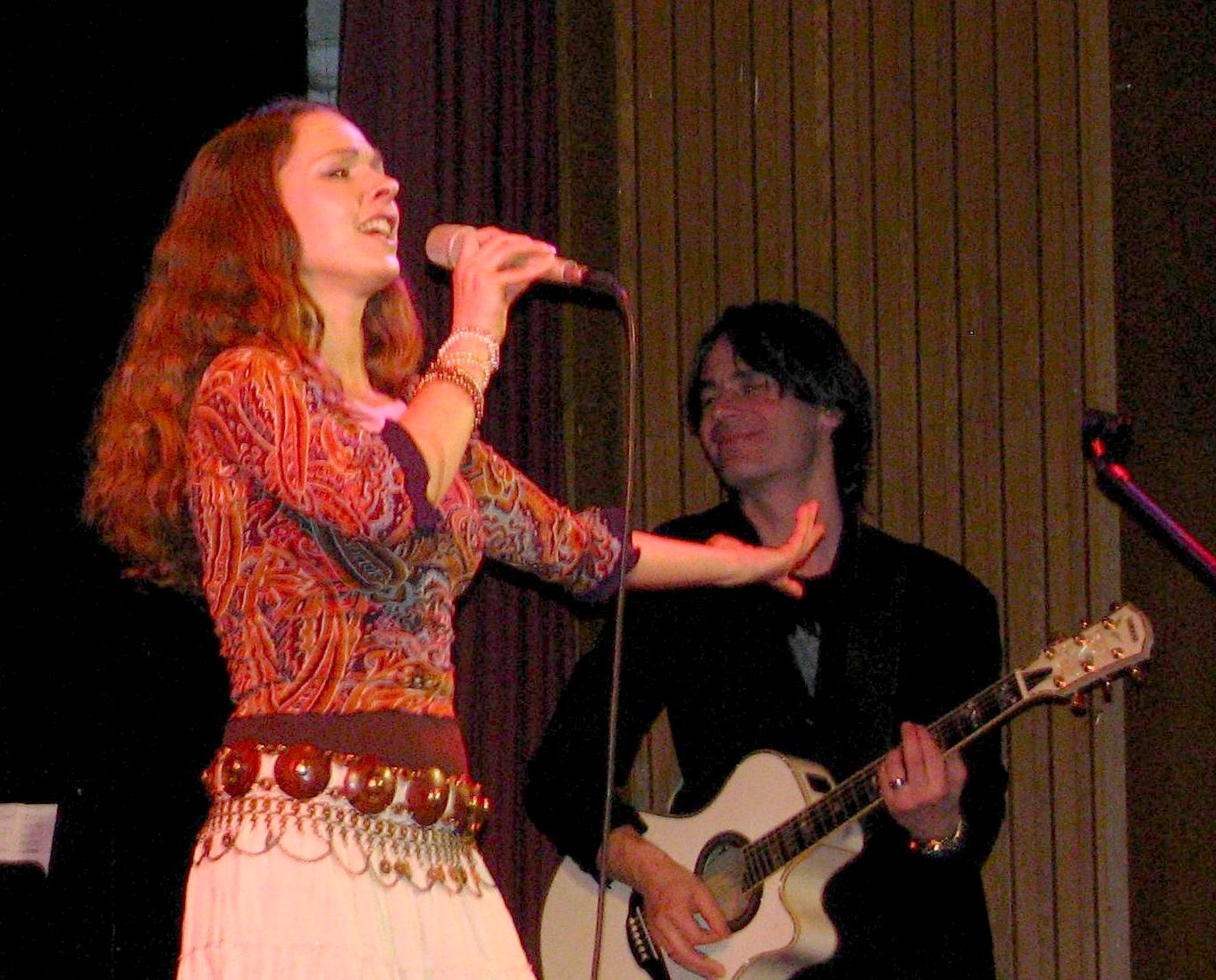
- Dominique Lacasa, in concert Winter 2010
- Born: Dominique-Franca Lacasa; 21 September 1976 (age 49); East Berlin, German Democratic Republic
- Occupation: singer
- Years active: 1985-present
- Parents: Frank Schöbel (father); Aurora Lacasa (mother)
- Website: www.dominique-lacasa.de

Dominique Lacasa (born September 21, 1976) is a German singer who has been performing since she was nine years old. She made her debut with her parents, Frank Schöbel and Aurora Lacasa in a 1985 Christmas special. Later, she took classical and jazz training while touring with a pop band Two as One. Since 2008, she has performed as a solo artist, traveling from Alaska to New Zealand and experimenting with combinations of Latin rhythms, jazz, and pop.

== Biography ==
Dominique-Franca Lacasa was born on 21 September 1976 in East Berlin in the German Democratic Republic (GDR). She is the daughter of Frank Schöbel and the cabaret singer Aurora Lacasa. From the age of six, she was playing the piano and at age 12 began attending the Köpenick music school, where she learned guitar.

She debuted on a 1985 television Christmas Special with her parents and sister Odette. The album of "Weihnachten in Familie" (Christmas with Family) has sold 1.4 million copies and was the best-selling record in the GDR. In 1994, they repeated the tradition with a performance called "Fröhliche Weihnachten in Familie" (Happy Christmas with Family), shortly before her parents' divorce. Around this same time, her mother introduced her to Marcus Fritzsch and they formed a singing duo, "Two is One" and began touring together. After a successful tour in April 2000 to Thailand, they recorded their first album, with Dominique writing the lyrics and Marcus setting songs to music. Lacasa finished high school and went on to study classical music under Eleanor Forbes and jazz with Judy Niemack-Prins, the first professor to teach jazz singing in Germany at the Hochschule für Musik "Hanns Eisler". She also continued with her piano instruction under jazz pianist, Reggie Moore and graduated in 2003.

Upon graduation from school, Lacasa who was teaching at a music school in Kleinmachnow was asked to record the theme song of the hit ARD television series "Berlin, Berlin" and she brought Fritzsch in on the project. He produced "Baby, Now that I've found you", a single for series as well. The couple developed a project "Abbafieber" (ABBA Fever) in 2004, which toured throughout Europe until the couple's break up in 2008, when she began a solo career. She also performed separately from Fritzsch, starring in "Rhythm Berlin" at the Friedrichstadt-Palast under the direction of Thomas Münstermann between 2004 and 2007. In 2009, Lacasa joined with twin brothers Rafael and Victor Alcántara to produce the album "Solamente Nosotros" (Just us) which combines Latin rhythms, jazz grooves and instrumental sections. For several years she has performed jazz with bassist Tobias Kabiersch at venues in Berlin and traveled extensively, from Alaska to New Zealand.

== Selected works ==
- 1985: Weihnachten in Familie (Amiga Records) (with Frank Schöbel, Aurora Lacasa)
- 1995: Fröhliche Weihnachten in Familie (Buschfunk Records) (with Frank Schöbel, Aurora Lacasa)
- 2001: Breathe (Playground Records) (as Two is One)
- 2002: The Midnight Sun (Playground Records)
- 2002: Waters of March on the Clubsampler Feeling good III (BMG) (as Two is One)
- 2003: Never Give Up (BMG) (as Two is One)
- 2003: Baby, Now That I’ve Found You (BMG) (as Background singer for Felicitas Woll)
- 2008: Go My Way (Zett Records)
- 2009: Solamente Nosotros (AMV) (with Formación Alcántara)
