= Frank Schöbel =

German pop singer (born 1942)

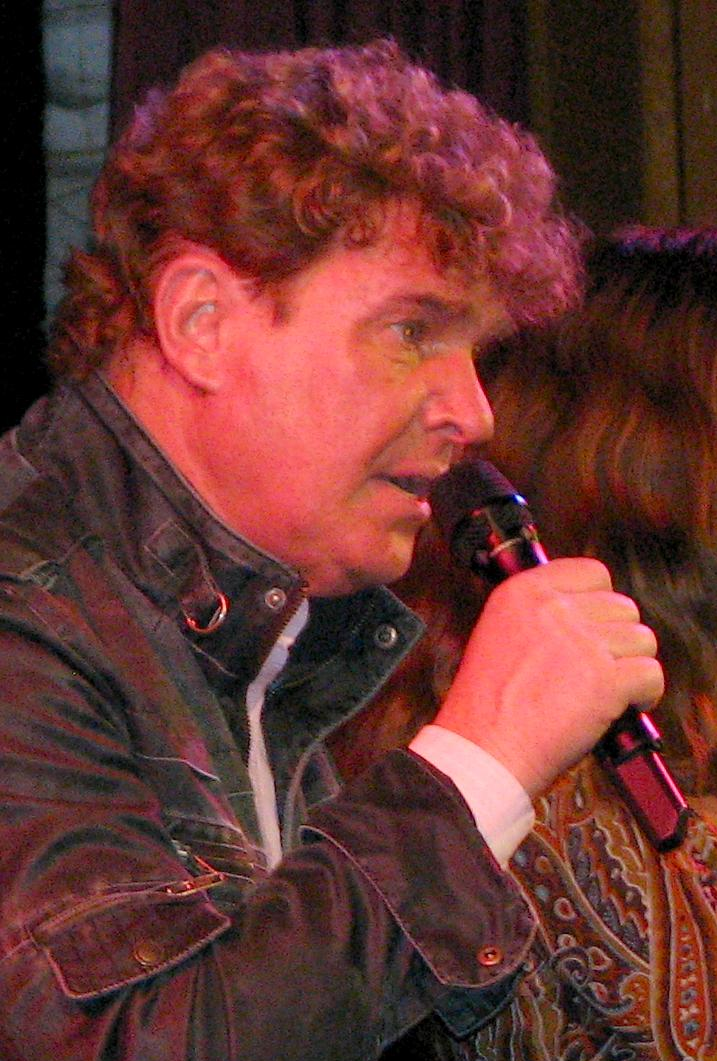
- Schöbel in 2010

Background information
- Born: 11 December 1942 (age 83); Leipzig, Saxony, Germany
- Genre: German pop
- Occupation: Singer
- Spouse: Chris Doerk (m. 1966; div. 1974) Aurora Lacasa (m. 1975; div. 1996)
- Children: Dominique Lacasa
- Website: www.frank-schoebel.de

Frank Schöbel (born 11 December 1942 in Leipzig) is a German singer. He was one of the most successful pop singers in East Germany (GDR) and has continued to perform after German reunification.

== Career ==
As the second son of an opera singer, his musical talent was discovered early. He began his career in East Germany as a musician but also appeared as a presenter and entertainer in TV shows and played in DEFA (GDR-state film production company) films.

In 1971, he recorded "Wie ein Stern" ("Like a Star"), which appeared in the acclaimed 2006 film The Lives of Others. This single was a smash hit in East Germany, selling 400,000 records for the East-German Amiga label and 150,000 for the West-German Philips Records. Schöbel was invited as the first East-German pop singer to appear in West Germany. He also had a hit in 1975 with his children's communist-sympathizing album We Paint a Sun, with, among other things, a song about Tokei-ihto. He sang the album's title song in 2005 with Lars Dietrich.

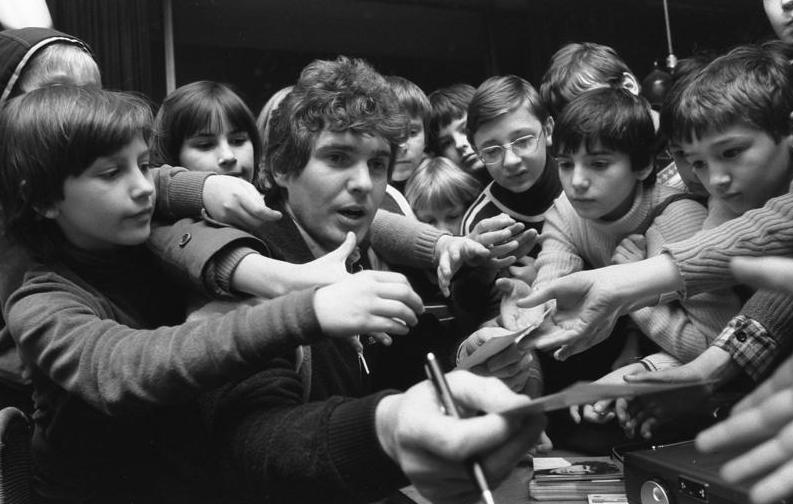
Schöbel (center) giving autographs in Berlin, January 1980

Schöbel performed at the opening ceremony of the 1974 FIFA World Cup in West Germany as a representative of the GDR in the Frankfurter Waldstadion, singing "Freunde gibt es überall" ("Friends can be found everywhere").

Schöbel was married to the actress and singer Chris Doerk from 1966 to 1974, with whom he often performed in the 1960s and 1970s. He was later married to Aurora Lacasa.

With Doerk he had a son, Alexander, and with Lacasa, daughters Dominique Lacasa (who is today a successful singer) and Odette. Together with his former wife Aurora and their two daughters, he took the LP family Weihnachten in Familie in one of the most important and best-selling albums of Christmas music of the GDR.

Schöbel continues to perform live, often with his ex-wife Chris Doerk.

== Films ==
- Reise ins Ehebett (1966)
- Wedding Night in the Rain (1967)
- Heißer Sommer (1968)
- Nicht schummeln, Liebling! (1972)
- Drei reizende Schwestern: Familienfest mit Folgen (1984, TV series)
- In aller Freundschaft (2007, TV series; guest star)

== See also ==
- Culture of East Germany
