= Reise ins Ehebett =

1966 film

- Directed by: Joachim Hasler
- Starring: Frank Schöbel
- Release date: 1966
- Running time: 85 min (television version); 95 min (film version)
- Country: East Germany
- Language: German

Reise ins Ehebett is an East German film. It was released in 1966 and featured the first film appearance by pop singer Frank Schöbel.
