= Fortschritt ZT 300 =

Series of 20 kN agricultural tractors

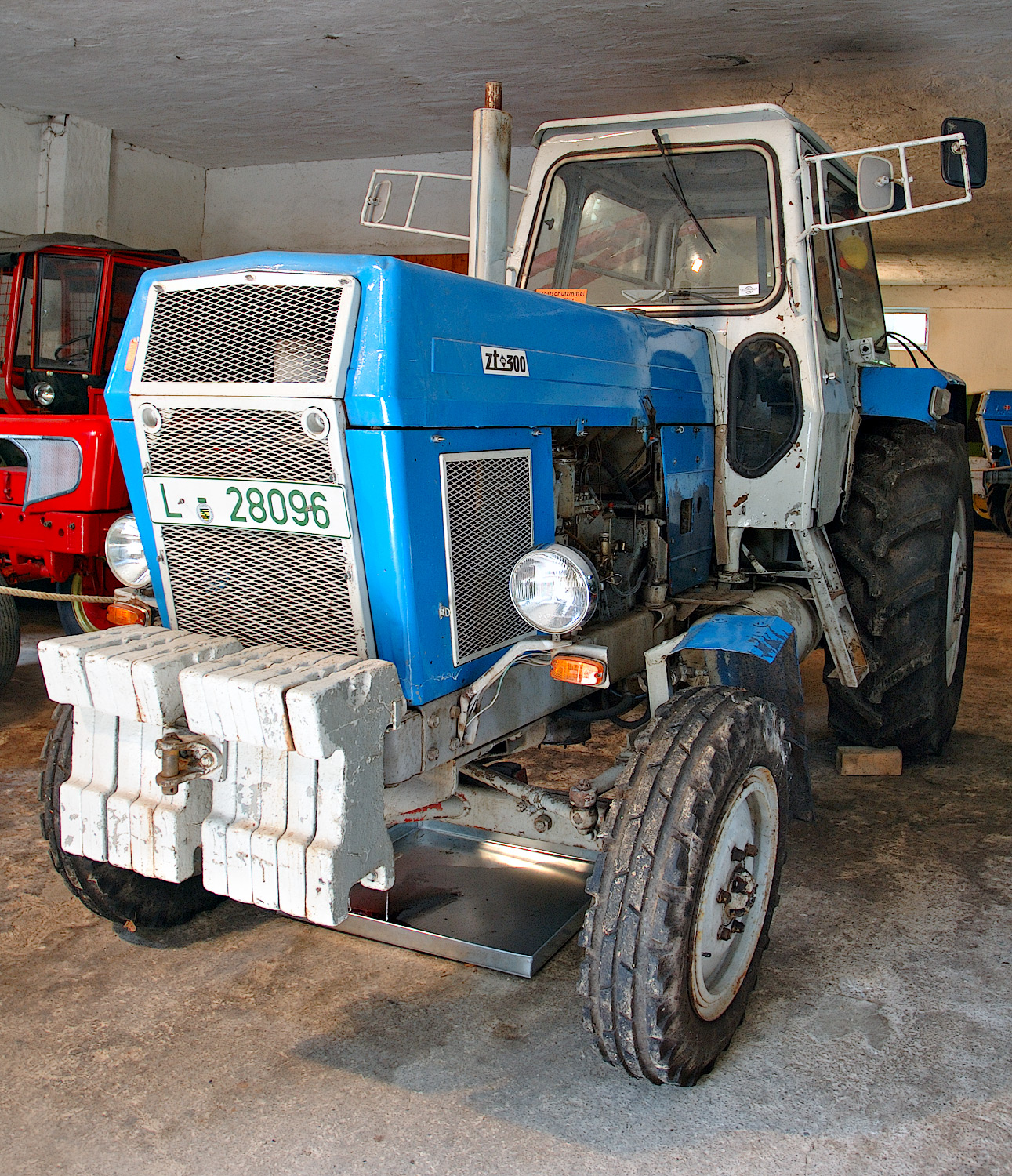
- ZT 300
- Type: Agricultural
- Manufacturer: Traktorenwerk Schönebeck
- Production: 1967–1984
- Length: 4690 mm
- Width: 2020 mm
- Height: 1800 mm
- Weight: 4820 kg
- Propulsion: Tyres
- Engine model: 4 VD 14,5/12-1 SRW
- Flywheel power: 74 kW
- Drawbar pull: On wet surfaces: ZT 300: 13 kN; ZT 303: 18 kN; On slopes, ZT 303: 34 kN
- Speed: 28.84 km/h
- Preceded by: RS14
- Succeeded by: Fortschritt ZT 320

ZT 300 is a series of 20 kN agricultural tractors, produced from 1 September 1967 to 1984 by the VEB Traktorenwerk Schönebeck. It succeeded the RS14 Famulus series, and unlike the Famulus, the ZT 300 series was sold under the brand name Fortschritt ("Progress"). ZT 300 refers both to the initial ZT 300 model, and the ZT 300 series. In total, 72,382 units of the ZT 300 series were made. The model with the highest production figure was the ZT 303, which was introduced in 1972. It features an automatic all-wheel-drive system; in the early 1980s, it cost 81,000 Mark. Starting in 1983, the ZT 300 series was succeeded by the ZT 320.

== Chronology ==
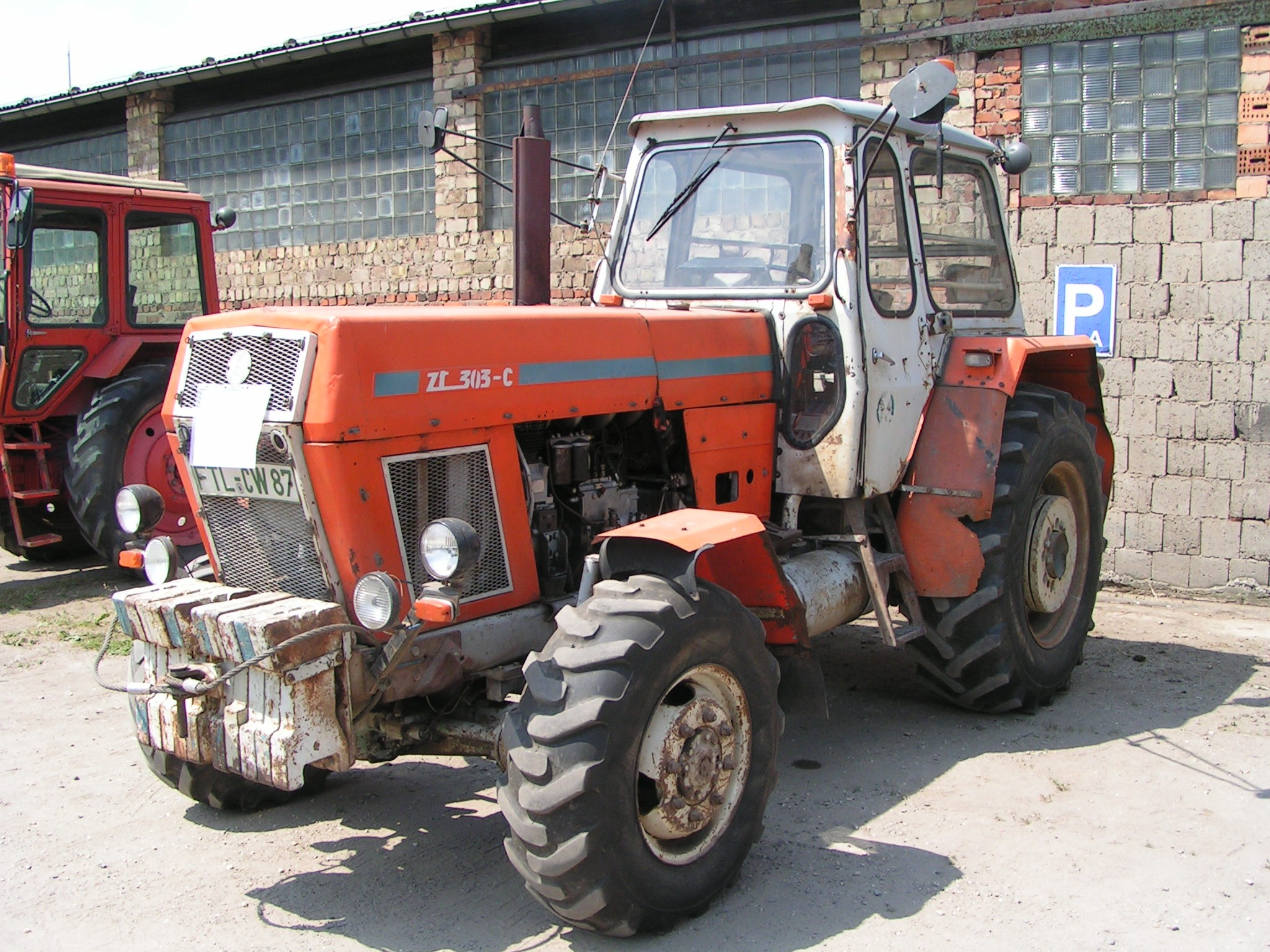
ZT 303

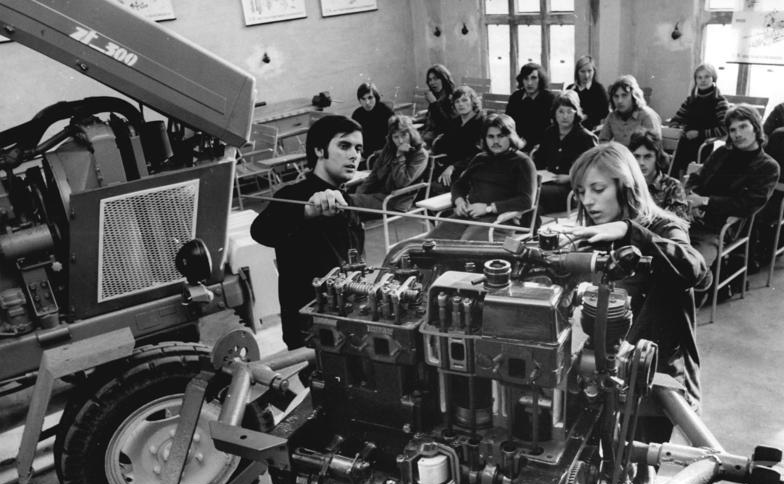
Agricultural engineering students in Langenstein

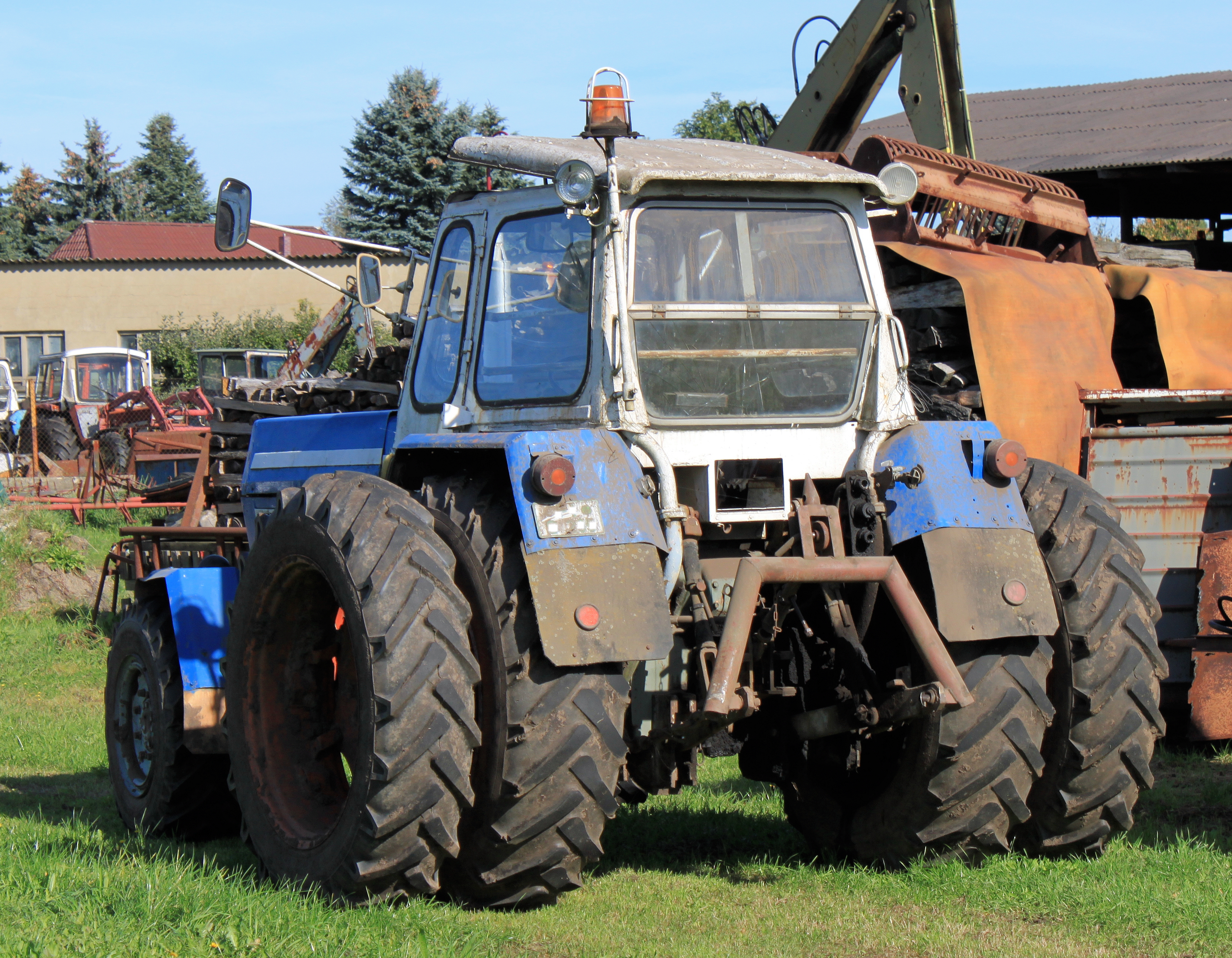
Twintyre ZT 303

In total, the ZT 300 series consisted of 6 series production models and one prototype:

- ZT 300: The base model with rear-wheel drive, meant for agricultural use
- ZT 303: All-wheel model, it shares its front axle with the IFA W50 LA
- ZT 304: A road tractor, no hydraulics, no PTO, no work lights, no powershift gearbox
- ZT 305: Like the ZT 303, with additional twin tyres and enhanced dual-circuit brakes
- ZT 300 GB: Based on the ZT 300, has rubber tracks instead of tyres
- ZT 403: An engine upgrade for the ZT 303, the four-cylinder engine was replaced with a six-cylinder engine (type 6 VD 14,5/12-1 SRW) producing 110 kW
- ZT 307: An engine upgrade for the ZT 305, the four-cylinder engine was replaced with a six-cylinder engine (type 6 VD 14,5/12-1 SRW) producing 110 kW. This model remained a prototype.

Some tractors were converted into road-rail-vehicles. They were mainly used for shunting in smaller East German plants.

== Technical description ==
The ZT 300 series tractors design is based on a combination of the frameless block construction for the rear part and a half frame for the front. This makes the rear axle an unsprung, rigid beam axle, whereas the front beam axle has a pivot point and allows wheel travel. The ZT 300 has a three-point-linkage with a lifting force of 17.65 kN and a PTO as well as a hydraulic system. Starting in 1974, an optimised hydraulic system was used, that automatically increased the weight on the rear axle by slightly lifting the farm implement attached to the three-point linkage, if required. This resulted in better traction and therefore greater drawbar pull force.

All ZT 300 tractors have a manual three-speed semi powerspeed gearbox with three forward and two reverse ranges, this results in a total of nine forward and six reverse gears. It allows speeds between 3.1 and ca. 30 km/h. A pneumatic two stage clutch of the type DK 80 is used to transmit the torque to the gearbox. The first clutch stage connects the gearbox, the second stage connects the PTO shaft(s), hydraulic system and the load stage of the gearbox. The load stage increases the torque transmitted to the wheels. It can be switched without having to stop the tractor by moving the load stage lever and pressing the clutch pedal. The rear axle also has a differential lock.

The engine is the 4 VD 14,5/12-1 SRW, a straight four-cylinder, direct-injected, diesel engine with a displacement of 6560 cc. Initially, it was detuned to produce 66 kW at 1500 rpm, but in 1973, the power output was increased to 68 kW, and in 1978, to 74 kW at 1800 rpm. The maximum torque is 422 Nm at 1350 rpm. The specific fuel consumption is rated 238 g/kWh at 1350 rpm.

The initial ZT 300 models have a rack-and-pinion steering, whereas later models have a fully hydraulic steering system. Only the rear wheels have brakes. All tractors may pull trailers with a maximum payload of 24.000 kg, if the trailer has a pneumatic brake system.

=== All wheel drive system ===
The all wheel drive system enables itself automatically using a roller-type overrunning clutch if the wheel slip is greater than 7–8 percent. The front axle is same as in the IFA W50 LA, this results in less ground clearance compared to the rear wheel drive ZT 300 tractors. Like the rear axle, the AWD front axle has a lockable differential. The ZT 305 also has brakes for the front wheels, bigger tyres and rear twin tyres; it was developed for slopes with gradients of up to 45 percent.

=== Forward and reverse speeds ===
Speed in km/h
Range – Gear	forward	reverse
Range I – 1. Gear	3.02	3.12
Range I – 2. Gear	4.70	4.86
Range I – 3. Gear	6.45	6.71
Range II – 1. Gear	3.76	3.88
Range II – 2. Gear	5.86	6.06
Range II – 3. Gear	9.27	9.59
Range III – 1. Gear	11.67	–
Range III – 2. Gear	18.19	–
Range III – 3. Gear	28.84	–

=== Paint colours ===
The ZT 300 series tractors were made with four different paint colours:

- Vermillion/Grey-white/Squirrel-grey
- Azure/Grey-white/Squirrel-grey
- Reseda/Grey-white/Squirrel-grey
- TGL 21196

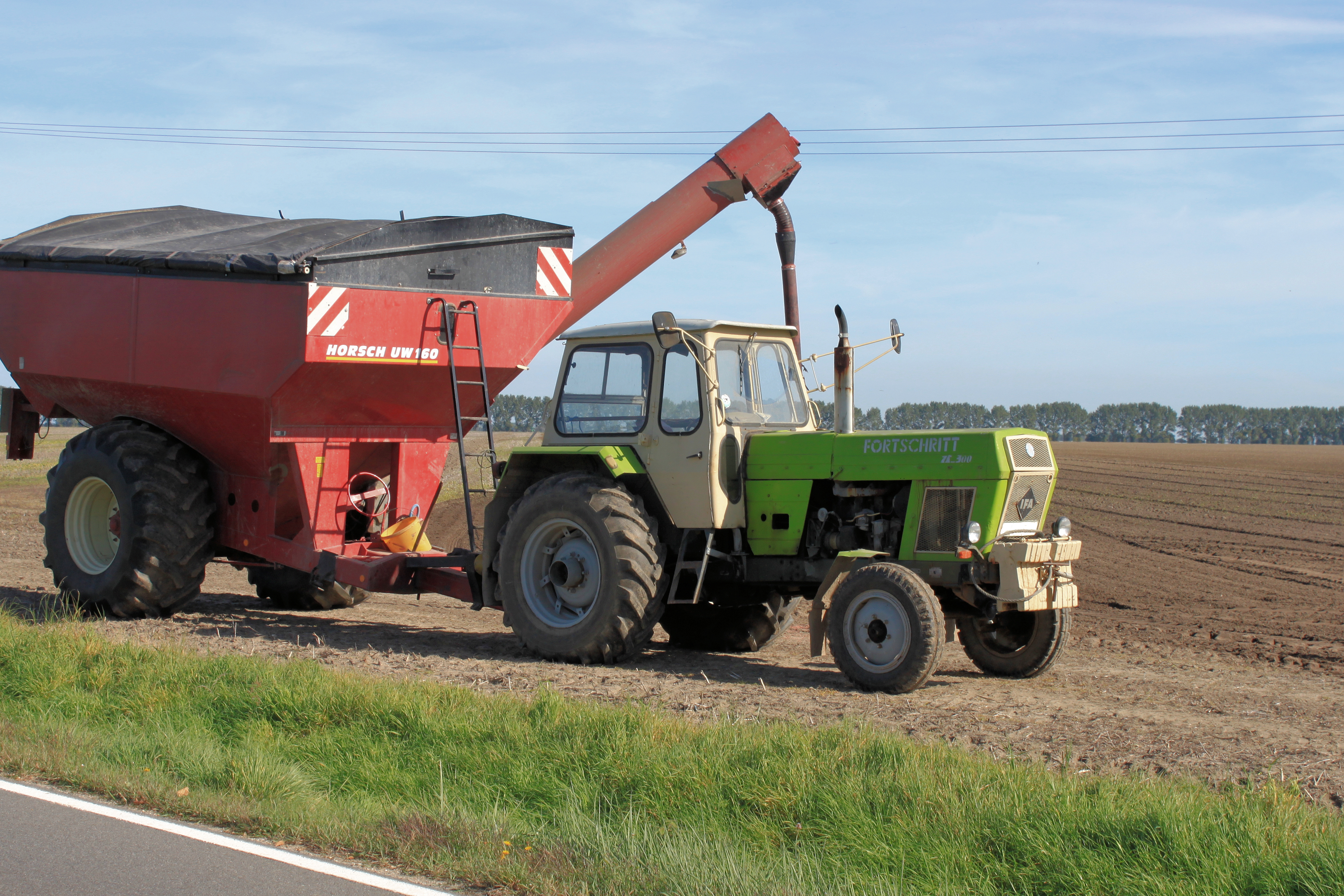
Reseda

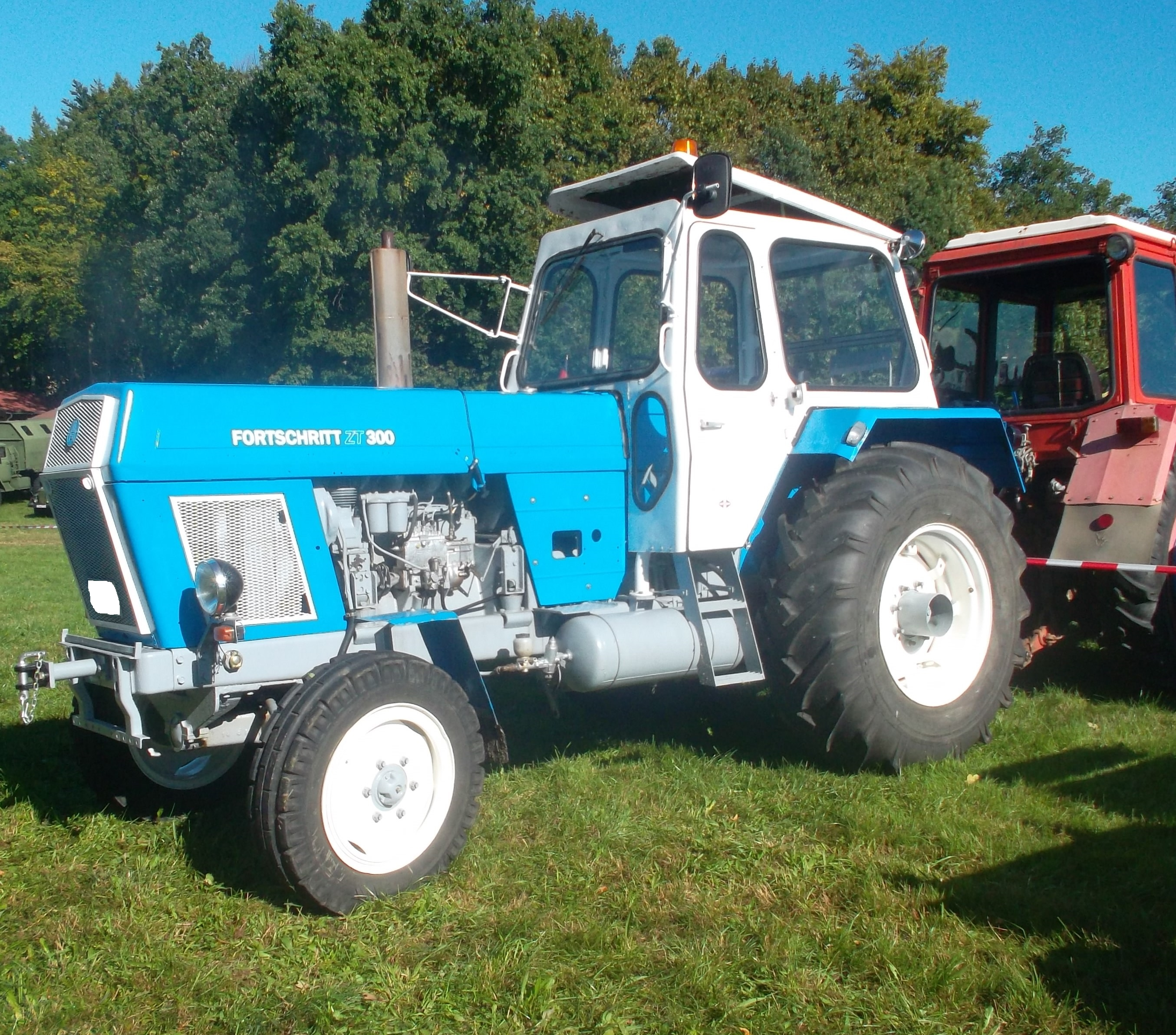
Azure

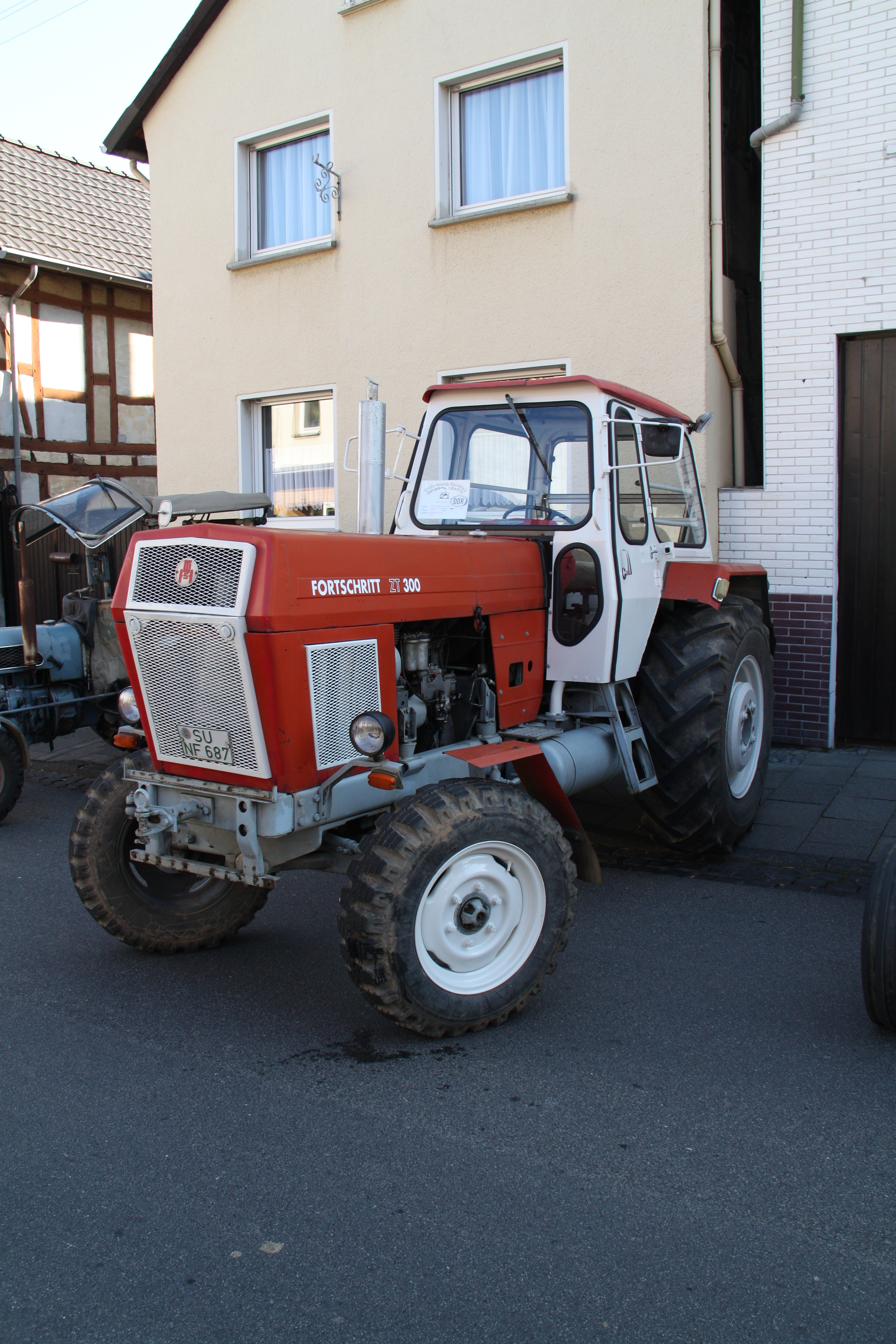
Vermillion

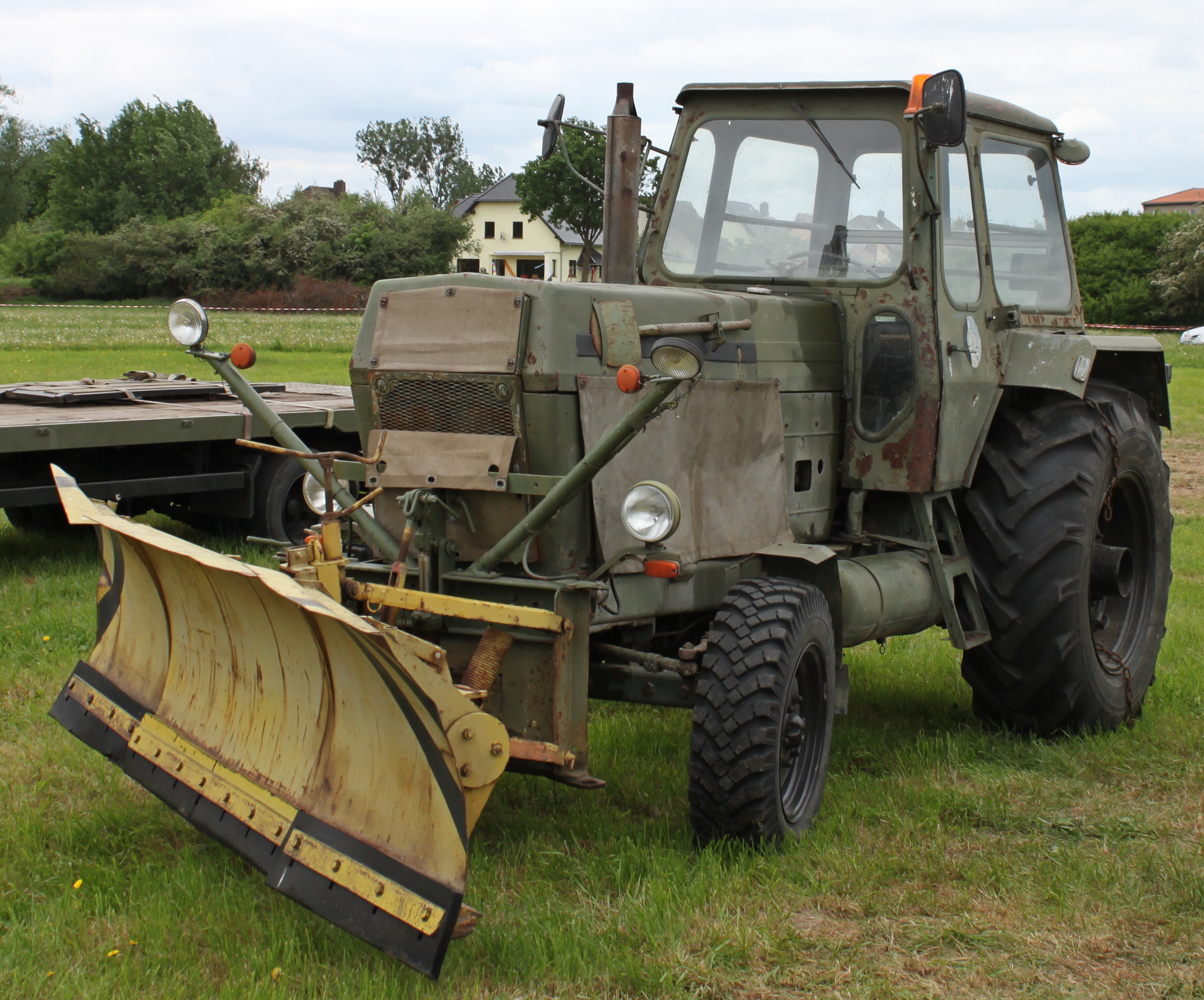
ZT 300 of the former NVA

== Bibliography ==
- Achim Bischof: Traktoren in der DDR. Podszun, Brilon 2004, ISBN 3-86133-348-1.
- Klaus Tietgens: Fortschritt ZT 300. Typengeschichte und Technik. GeraMond, München 2014, ISBN 978-3-86245-575-1.
- Jan Welkerling: FORTSCHRITT in allen Ähren. DDR-Landmaschinen im Einsatz. 2005.
