= Chris Doerk =

German singer and actress (born 1942)

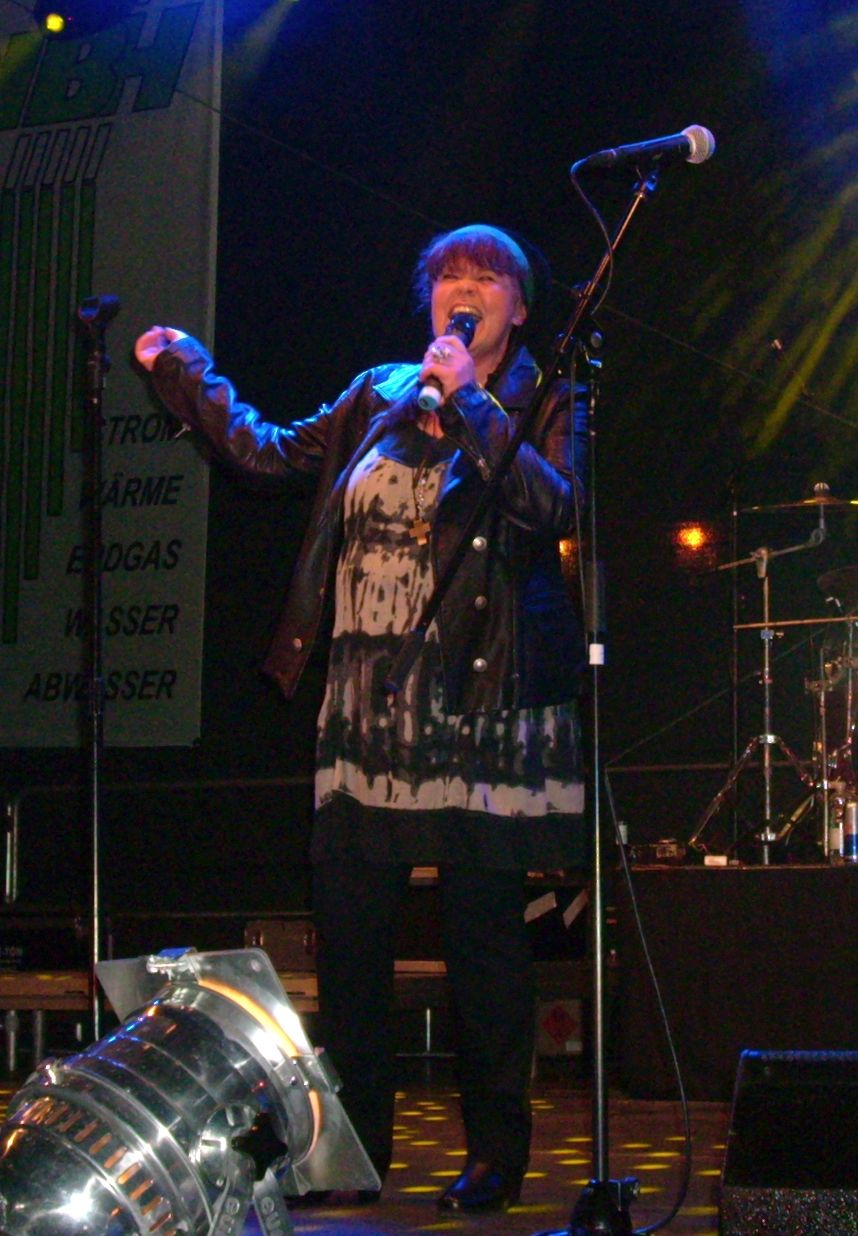
Chris Doerk performing in 2012

Chris Doerk (born 24 February 1942, Königsberg, East Prussia, Germany) is a German musician and actress. She was a successful pop singer in socialist East Germany (GDR) and was married to fellow singer Frank Schöbel.

== Life and career ==
Doerk rose to prominence after winning a talent competition. As a young woman, she worked as a commercial designer and a model. In the 1960s, she was considered a pop music star with husband Frank Schöbel, and the pair sold millions of records. The two sang and danced together in two DEFA films: Heißer Sommer (1968) and Nicht schummeln, Liebling! (1972). The pair divorced in 1974, and also went separate ways professionally. Doerk had one son with Schöbel.

After the divorce, Doerk continued to perform through the 1980s, and spent much time overseas, particularly in Cuba. She published a book about Cuba in 2002 called La Casita. Following German reunification, Doerk took a break from singing, but she made a comeback, and released her first record after 20 years in 2012.

In 2023, she revealed that she was "seriously ill" and canceled all of her performances.
