= Gerd Natschinski =

German composer (1928–2015)

- Born: 23 August 1928; Chemnitz, Germany
- Died: 4 August 2015 (aged 86); Berlin, Germany
- Other name: Gerd Joachim Natschinski
- Occupations: Composer, orchestra leader
- Years active: 1952-1990 (film and television)

Gerd Natschinski (23 August 1928 – 4 August 2015) was a German composer. He worked on the scores for more than forty film and television series during his career. He was employed by the East German state-controlled studio DEFA.

Natschinski died on 4 August 2015 in a Berlin hospital.

== Selected filmography ==
- My Wife Makes Music (1958)
- Heißer Sommer (1968)

== Selected operettas and musicals ==
- Messeschlager Gisela (1960, premiered at Metropol Theater Berlin)
- Servus Peter (1961)
- Mein Freund Bunbury (1964, premiered at Metropol Theater Berlin) based on The Importance of Being Earnest
- Casanova (1976, premiered at Metropol Theater Berlin)
- Caballero (1988)
- Ein Fall für Sherlock Holmes (1982)

== Bibliography ==
- Marc Silberman & Henning Wrage. DEFA at the Crossroads of East German and International Film Culture: A Companion. Walter de Gruyter, 2014.
