= M-System =

Direct injection system for diesel engines

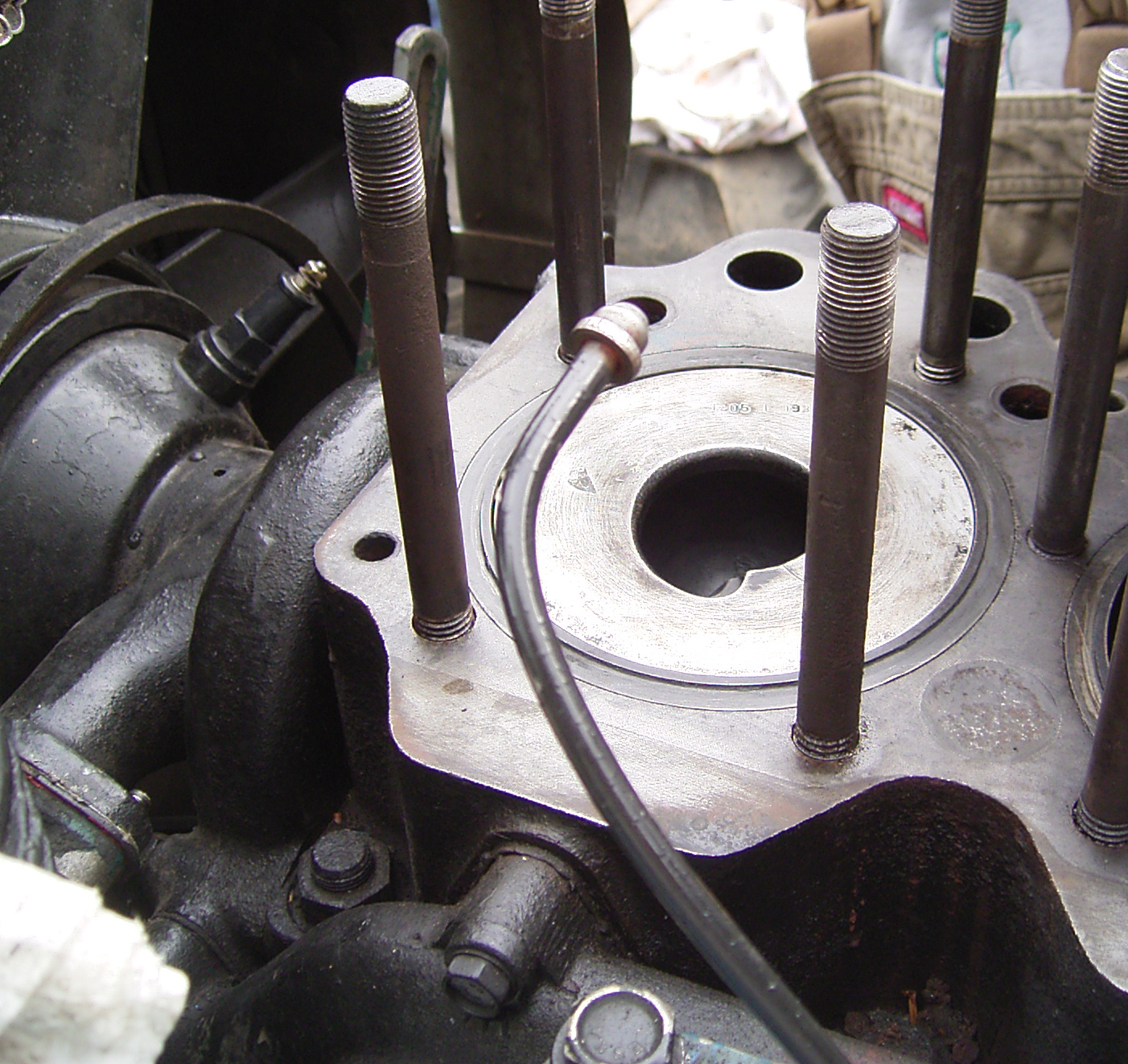
M-System engine with its cylinder head removed. Note the piston with the characteristic sphere-shaped combustion chamber. (4 VD 14,5/12-1 SRW)

The MAN M-System, also referred to as M-Process and M combustion process, is a direct injection system for diesel engines. In M-System engines, the fuel is injected onto the walls of the combustion chamber that is solely located inside the piston, and shaped like a sphere. The M-System was rendered obsolete by modern fuel injection systems for diesel engines. Due to its particularities, the M-System was only used for stationary applications and commercial vehicle engines, passenger car engines with this design have never been made. The letter M is an abbreviation for the German word Mittenkugelverfahren, meaning centre sphere combustion process.

== Operating principle ==
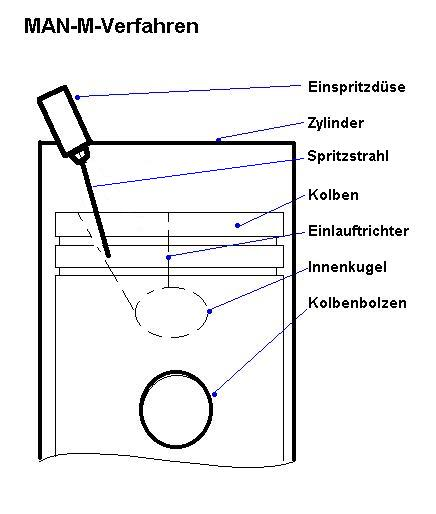
Schematic

Unlike regular diesel engines, in which the fuel is injected as far away as possible from the combustion chamber walls to obtain better efficiency, in M-System engines, the fuel is injected onto the walls of the combustion chamber. The combustion chamber is located inside the piston bowl and shaped like a sphere. Usually, M-System engines have single-spray or twin-spray injectors. In combination with the relatively low injection pressure, this results in a fine fuel film on the combustion chamber walls. However, a small portion of the fuel is injected into the air to initiate combustion, which raises the temperature inside the cylinder. The elevated temperature then causes the fuel film to vaporise and combust. Regular diesel engines mix air and fuel during injection by creating a high fuel velocity with high injection pressure. In M-System engines however, mixing air and fuel takes place after injection. Due to the low velocity of the fuel vaporising from the combustion chamber walls, the air velocity has to be great to achieve a high relative air-fuel velocity to aid mixing. Therefore, M-System engines have special whirl intake ports.

The idea of this operating principle is creating an air-fuel mixture that is more homogeneous with a dispersion of air and fuel that is more even than in regular diesel engines. Thus, M-System engines have relatively good air utilisation and can operate under heavy load without sooting. Due to the low amount of fuel that is mixed with air as ignition begins, the increase in pressure is fairly low, resulting in low combustion noise.

M-System engines suffer from high heat-transfer and flow losses, resulting in reduced efficiency and therefore higher fuel consumption. Furthermore, the thermal loads of both piston and cylinder head are very high, making M-System engines not very suitable for turbocharging. Under medium load, M-System engines emit high levels of hydrocarbons.

M-System engines have a specific fuel consumption (b_{e}) of ca. 156 g/PS·h (212 g/kW·h), equivalent to an efficiency of approximately 40 per cent.

== Multifuel operation ==
In M-System engines, the fuel is not exposed to heat during the injection phase, which not only allows using regular diesel engine fuels, but also petroleum fractions with average boiling points reaching from 313 to 673 K as well as petrol with no more than 86 RON as fuels.

A special iteration of the M-System, the FM-System, was designed to further improve the M-System's multifuel characteristics. FM is an abbreviation for the German word Fremdzündungsmittenkugelverfahren, meaning spark ignition centre sphere combustion process. FM-System engines feature spark ignition, but still keep characteristics that are typical of diesel engines, such as internal mixture formation and quality torque control. Therefore, FM engines are neither diesel, nor Otto engines; instead, they operate on a hybrid combustion process. Compared to regular M-System engines, the exhaust behaviour is better. The spark plugs used for FM-System engines are located at the opposite side of the injection nozzle and usually have two parallel pin electrodes, or three mass electrodes.

== History ==
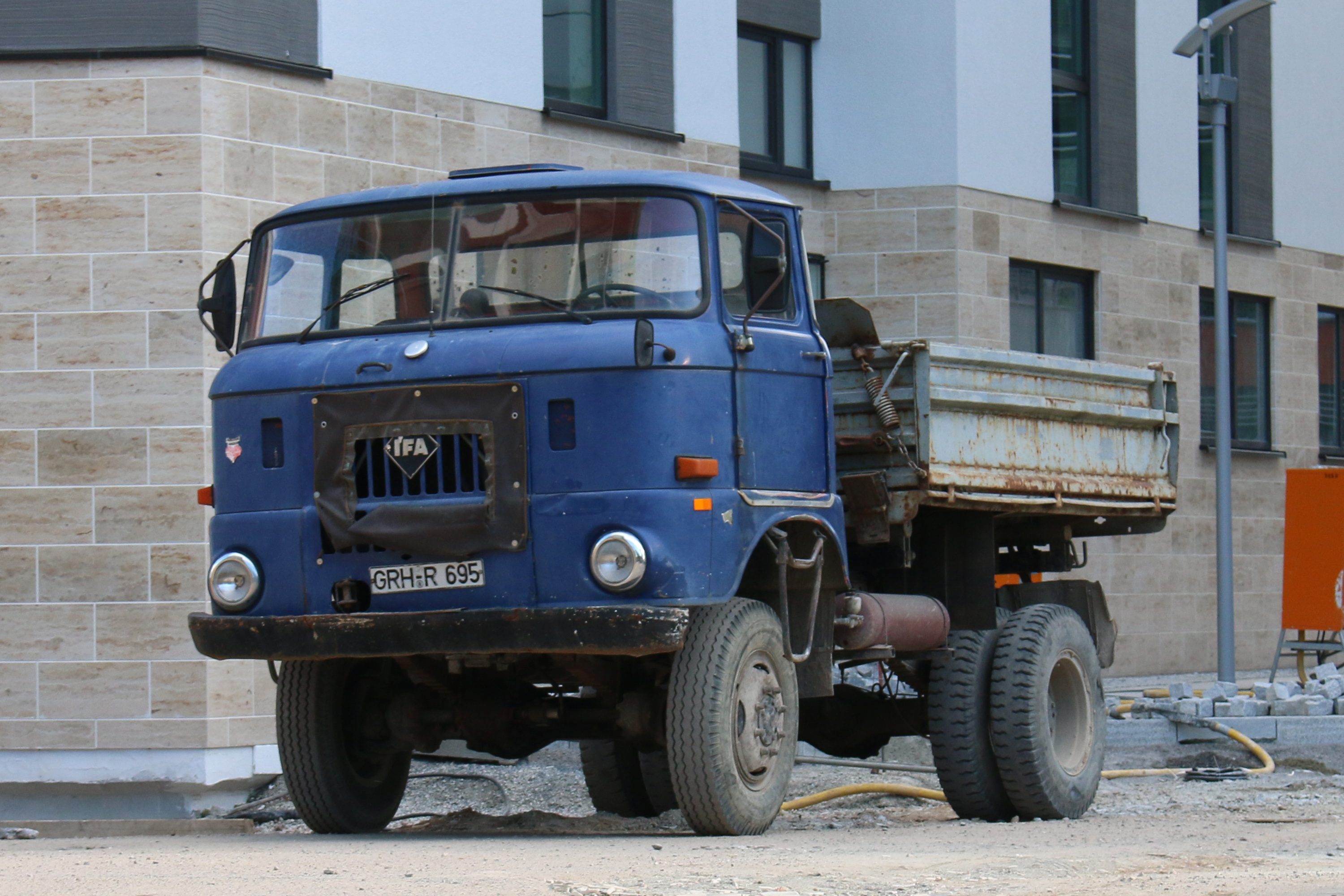
IFA W50, a lorry with an M-System engine

German engineer Kurt Blume is said to have had the idea of the M-System in 1940. In 1941, he first brought his idea to paper. After World War II, J. Siegfried Meurer, then an MAN engineer, continued development of the M-System and prepared it for series production. Meurer obtained a patent (DBP 865683) on the M-System in 1951. First prototype M-System engines ran on the test bench in 1954 and 1955. East German manufacturer IFA acquired a licence for the M-System and built the 4 VD 14,5/12-1 SRW diesel engine starting from 1967, which is the engine with the highest production number featuring the M-System. In the mid 1960s, J. Böttger claimed that MAN M-engines did not operate on the principle described in Meurer's patent (DBP 865683), which resulted in a patent lawsuit. FM-System engines have been used from the late-1960s to the mid-1980s.
