= Heißer Sommer =

1968 film by Joachim Hasler

- Film poster
- Directed by: Joachim Hasler
- Written by: Joachim Hasler; Maurycy Janowski
- Produced by: Horst Dau
- Starring: Chris Doerk; Frank Schöbel; Madeleine Lierck; Hanns-Michael Schmidt
- Cinematography: Joachim Hasler; Roland Dressel
- Edited by: Anneliese Hinze-Sokolowa
- Music by: Gerd Natschinski; Thomas Natschinski Stateside Records UK Alternate Track E M I
- Production company: Deutsche Film (DEFA)
- Distributed by: Progress Film (1968) (East Germany) (theatrical); First Run Features (USA) (DVD); First Run Features (USA) (VHS) (subtitled)
- Release date: 21 June 1968
- Running time: 91 minutes
- Country: East Germany
- Language: German

Heißer Sommer, aka Hot Summer (USA), is a 1968 East German musical film. A 2001 video release promotes the film as "The East German Grease" although perhaps it is closer in concept to the 1963 British movie Summer Holiday which starred Cliff Richard.

== Plot ==
A group of girls and a separate group of boys come across each other whilst travelling from Leipzig to Rügen Island for the summer holidays. Initially trying to ignore and avoid each other, the two groups find themselves billeted close by, relaxing together, enjoying each other's company and the resulting relationships that develop. The movie deals with the conflicts of each relationship in the group by singing and dancing their way through each situation including a brief encounter with the VoPo's - the police. The majority of the film is shot on Rügen Island which at the time, was a popular destination for East Germans and today is popular with travellers the world over. Included are some early footage of Leipzig and East Berlin during the reconstruction and re-building era of the former GDR.

== Cast ==
- Chris Doerk - Stupsi
- Frank Schöbel - Kai
- Regine Albrecht - Brit
- Hanns-Michael Schmidt - Wolf
- Georg-Peter Welzel - Schpack
- Hans Mietzner - Schelle
- Norbert Speer - Rechtsanwalt (Lawyer)
- Gerd Nordheim - Tom
- Ernst-Jürgen Thede - Transistor
- Madeleine Lierck - Thalia
- Rosa Lotze - Trude
- Bruno Carstens - Meister Klaus
- Werner Lierck - Abschnittsbevollmächtigter (Policeman)
- Marianne Wünscher - VEG-Leiterin (Boss of Farm)
- Erich Brauer - Fischer (Fisherman)
- Urta Bühler - Sybille
- Camilla Hempel - Röschen (Rose)
- Leonore Kaufmann - Mädchen (Girl)
- Ursula Soika - Bärbel
- Hella Ziesing - Mädchen (Girl)
- Sylvia von Kashiwoslozki - Mädchen (Girl)
- Marlis Räth - Himmlische (Heavenly)
- Angelika Schmidt - Himmlische (Heavenly)
- Günther Lisiecki - Junge (Boy)
- Peter Heiland - Junge (Boy)
- Hans-Christian Albers - Junge (Boy)

== Soundtrack ==
1. Heißer Sommer (03:20) (Chris Doerk & Frank Schöbel)
2. Das Darf Nicht Wahr Sein (02:58) (Chris Doerk, Frank Schöbel, Regine Albrecht & Hanns-Michael Schmidt)
3. Männer, Die Noch Keine Sind (02:40) (Chris Doerk)
4. Wir (01:58) (Frank Schöbel)
5. Tanz Am Strand (02:04) (Orchester Günter Gollasch)
6. Woher Willst Du Wissen, Wer Ich Bin? (02:08) (Chris Doerk & Frank Schöbel)
7. Was Erleben (02:38) (Chris Doerk)
8. Ein Sommerlied (02:48) (Frank Schöbel)
9. Fang Doch Den Sonnenstrahl (02:28) (Gerti Möller & Frank Schöbel)
10. Ich Fand Die Eine (04:17) (Frank Schöbel)
11. Es War Mal Ein Mädchen (01:45) (Ingo Graf)
12. Einmal Muß Ein Ende Sein (02:40) (Frank Schöbel)
13. Finale Heißer Sommer (01:32) (Chris Doerk & Frank Schöbel)

== Reception and legacy ==
The film sold 3,441,595 tickets during its original run, making it the 39th highest grossing film in East German history. It was featured in the 1997 documentary film East Side Story. In 2009, a live musical production of Heißer Sommer was held in Berlin.

A 2000 review in Shock Cinema magazine said that the film "proves that East Germany used to make teen-musical exploitation flicks that were just as vapid as American drive-in fare", and that it was "goofy, colorful and best enjoyed in brief, easy-to-digest chunks". In a 2016 poll by newspaper Freie Presse, Heißer Sommer was voted by readers as the best East German film.

== See also ==
- Nicht schummeln, Liebling!, another film starring Doerk and Schöbel
