= IFA W 50 =

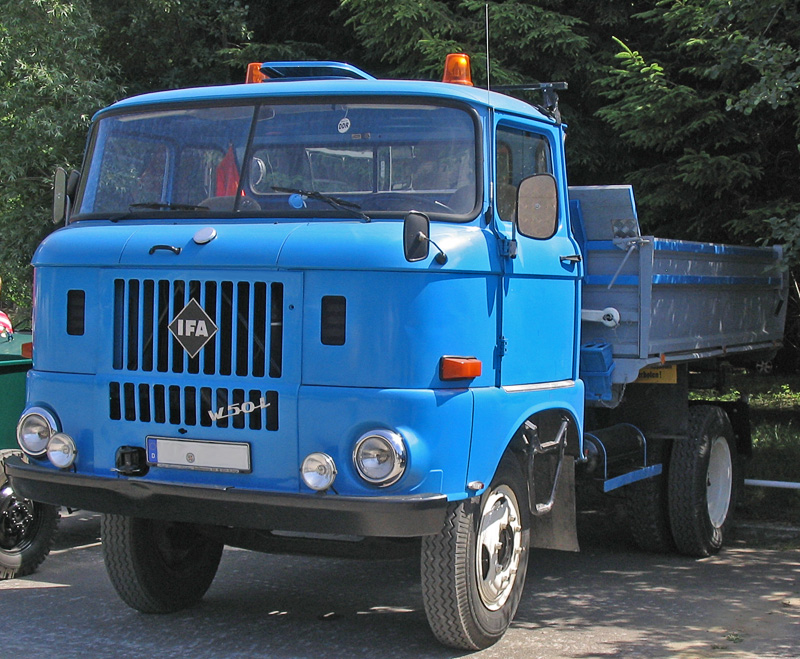
- IFA W 50 L

Overview
- Manufacturer: IFA-Kombinat Nutzkraftwagen (1965–June 1990); IFA-Automobilwerk Ludwigsfelde (June 1990–Dec 1990)
- Production: July 1965 – December 1990
- Assembly: East Germany: Ludwigsfelde

Body and chassis
- Body style: Cab-over truck

Powertrain
- Engine: 6560 cc 4 KVD 14,5/12 diesel I4 (1965–1967); 6560 cc 4 VD 14,5/12-1 SRW DI diesel I4 (1967–1990); 6560 cc 4 VD 14,5/12-2 DI diesel I4 (1967–1990)

Dimensions
- Wheelbase: 3,200 mm (130 in); 3,700 mm (150 in)
- Length: 5,300 mm (210 in)

Chronology
- Predecessor: IFA S4000-1
- Successor: IFA L 60

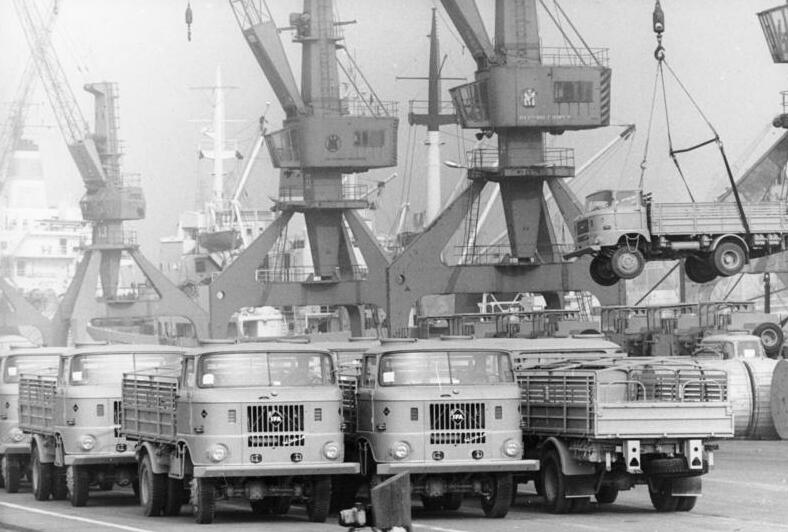
W 50 trucks from IWL on a quayside at Rostock in March 1982, being loaded onto a ship for export.

The IFA W 50 is a medium-duty truck built by the East German IFA conglomerate at their Ludwigsfelde plant from 1965 until 1990. A total of about 572,000 were built in Ludwigsfelde, with an unknown additional number of special-use vehicles assembled at other plants. It was meant to be succeeded by the IFA L 60 but outlived it by several months. IFA ended all truck production on 17 December 1990, following the reunification of Germany.

== History ==
Beginning in the late 1950s, the Kraftfahrzeugwerk "Ernst Grube" Werdau began work on a truck designed to replace the outmoded IFA W3 and S4000-1 models. Work progressed slowly, as the company had limited resources but had to respond to input from a number of political groups, including but not limited to the Moscow-based Comecon, the National People's Army, the Berlin Planning Commission, and General Secretary Walter Ulbricht himself. The truck was to have a cargo capacity of 4 1/2 tonnes (9,900 lb) while being able to take a variety of bodies, all-wheel drive and three axles had to be an option, production had to be simple, and it had to use a standardized engine. Originally called the S4500, the name changed to W 45 in 1959 ("W" for "Werdau"). The first prototype (W 45LF) was operational in June 1962, with the four-wheel drive W 45LAF following shortly thereafter. It was expected to enter production in the last quarter of 1964, but then the requirements were increased to 5 tonnes (11,000 lb) and the design was renamed the "W 50 - W stands for "Werdau" and 50 represents "five tonnes". However, on 21 December 1962 the Ministerrat der DDR decided that the VEB Industriewerke Ludwigsfelde (IWL) would build the W 50 instead of Werdau. One of the reasons for this decision was the cancellation of Baade 152 airliner production in February 1961, which had caused the end of Pirna 014 jet engine production at Ludwigsfelde (see above).

Construction of a new truck factory at Ludwigsfelde began in April 1963. The site covered 170 hectares (420 acres) and the production hall complex was the largest in the DDR, with a floor area of about 130,000 m^{2} (1,400,000 sq ft). The building extended 400 m (1,300 ft) in each direction, was 15.6 m (51 ft) high and the span between each of its steel columns was up to 24 m (79 ft). IWL completed the first W 50 truck on 17 July 1965, several months before the end of Troll 1 scooter production that December.

W 50 truck production rose rapidly from 5775 in 1966 — the first full year of production — to 16,973 in 1969. However, serious quality problems arose with the W 50. IWL was working on the development of future truck models, but in August 1969 it had to stop such work to devote the entire capacity of its development and construction offices to tackle them. IWL's efforts to develop new trucks were divided again in 1971, when the most urgent needs were to improve the W 50 with a new cab, new 180 bhp engine and better chassis. After 1969 W 50 production growth was slower but set a new record almost every year, peaking at 29,004 in 1982 and again at 32,516 in 1986.

A high proportion of IWL trucks was exported. Between 1978 and 1987 over 80% of W 50 trucks built each year were sold abroad. The DDR needed export orders from countries outside the Comecon bloc, and for this IWL continued to develop variants of the W 50. As a result of the 1980–88 Iran–Iraq War, both Iran and Iraq sought a simple, robust, inexpensive truck for their armies. The DDR was interested in supplying both sides in the war, so in March 1982 IWL began development of two derivative models, the IFA W 51 and W 52. The W 51 was meant to enter production in 1983, followed by the W 52 two years later. Part of the W 51 project was realised, but the W 52 was overtaken by an SED Politbüro decision in June 1983 to instruct IWL to concentrate on W 50 assembly and gradually displace it with its intended next-generation successor, the L 60. Total W 50 production at Ludwigsfelde from 1965 to 1990 was 571,831 vehicles, some sources state 571,789.

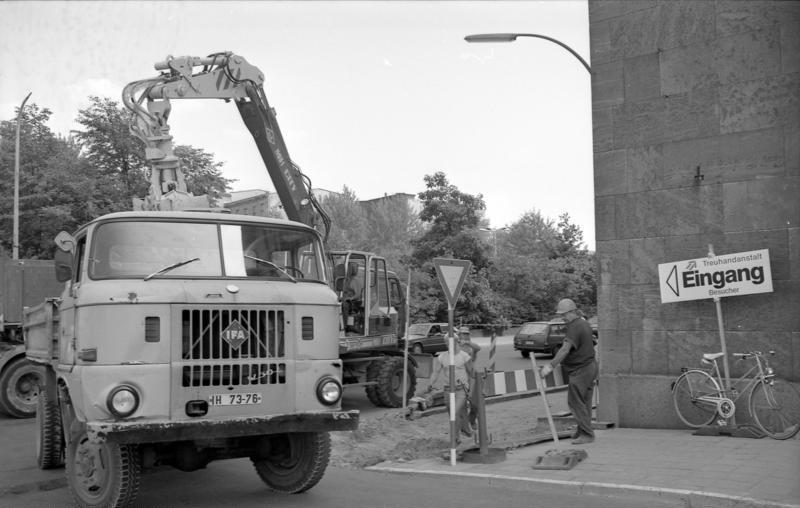
W 50 in Treuhand service, Berlin, 1991

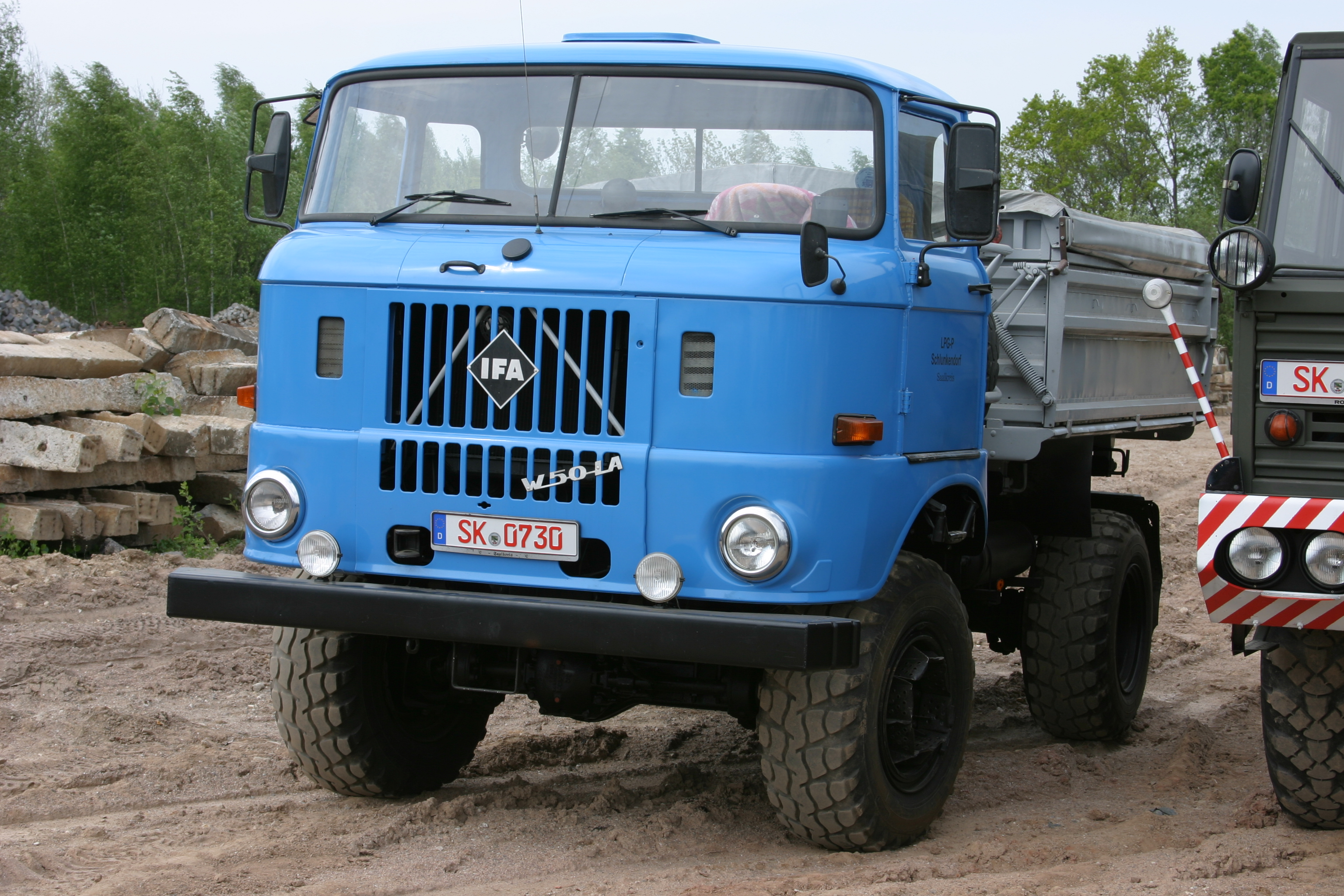
W 50 LA/Z (four-wheel-drive with balloon tires)

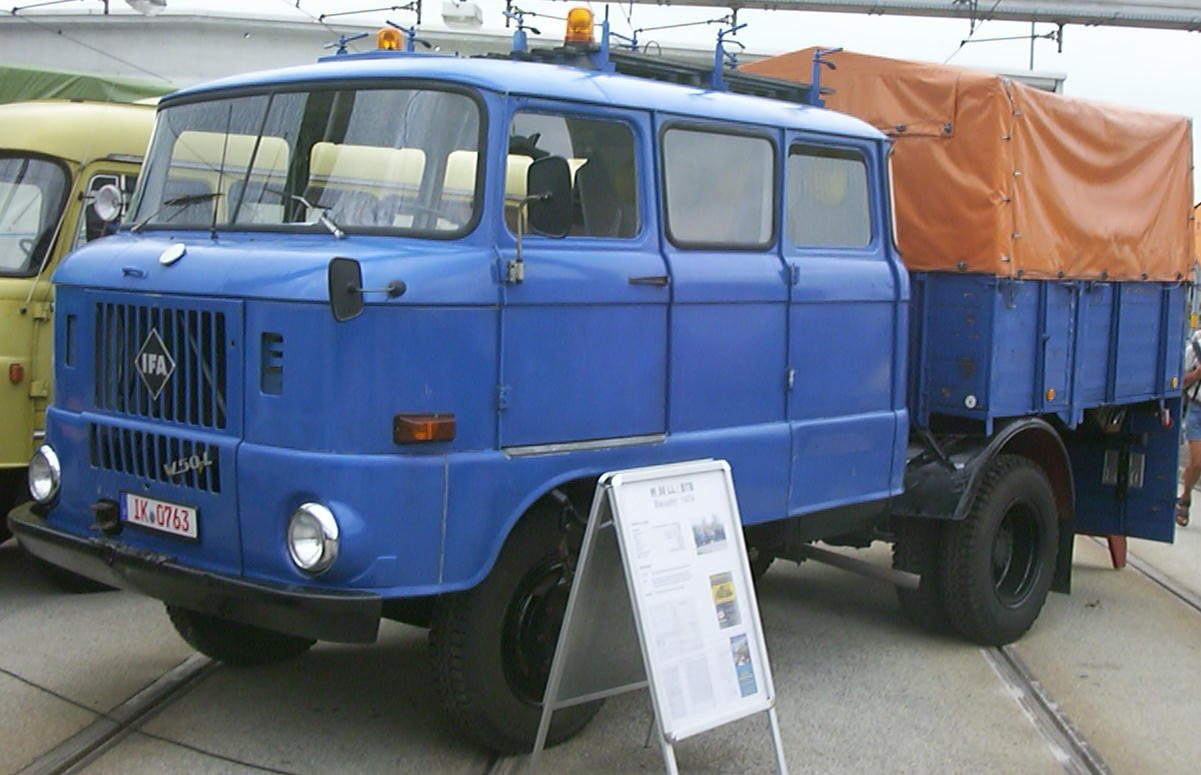
W 50 L BTP, crew cab version

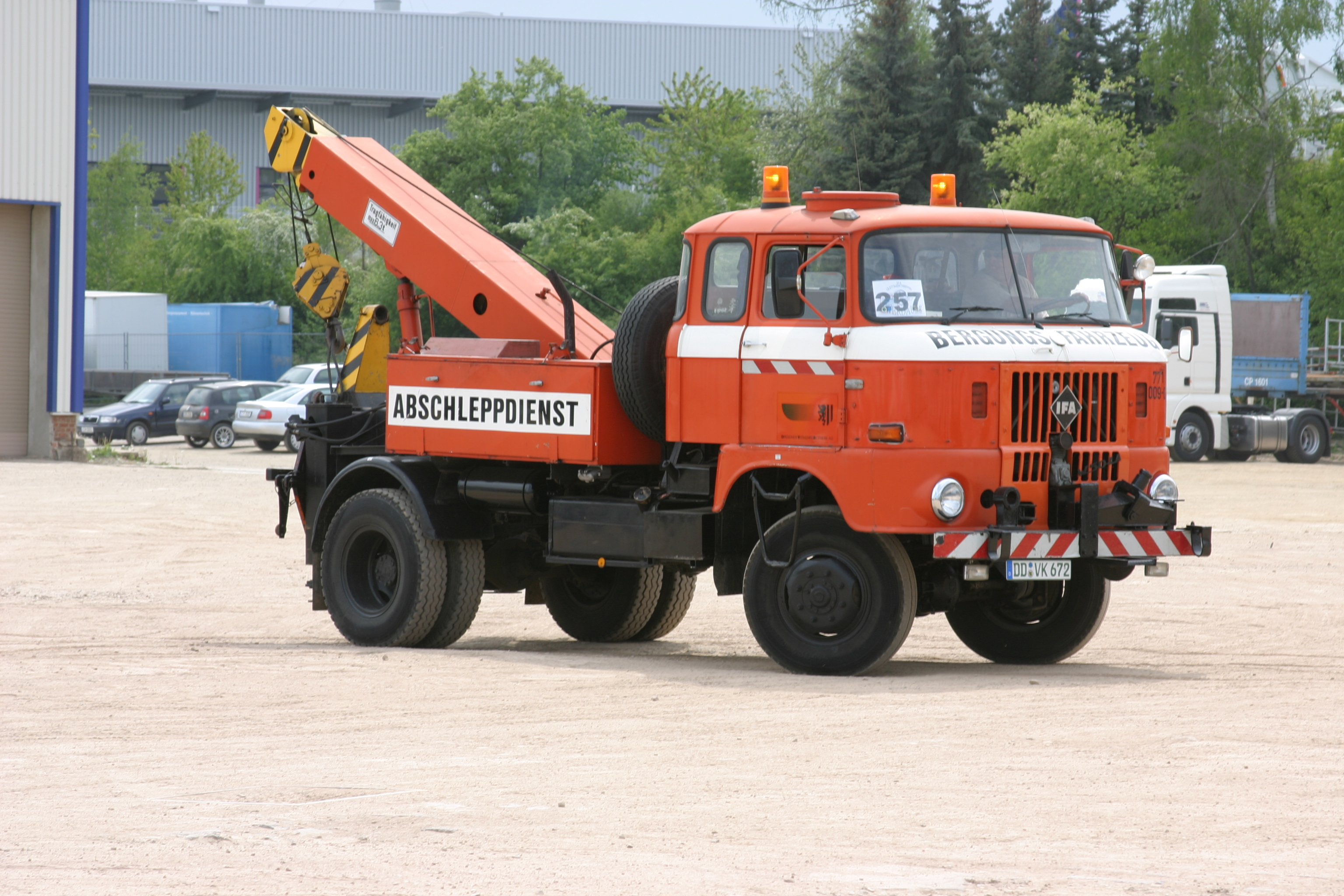
W 50 crane truck

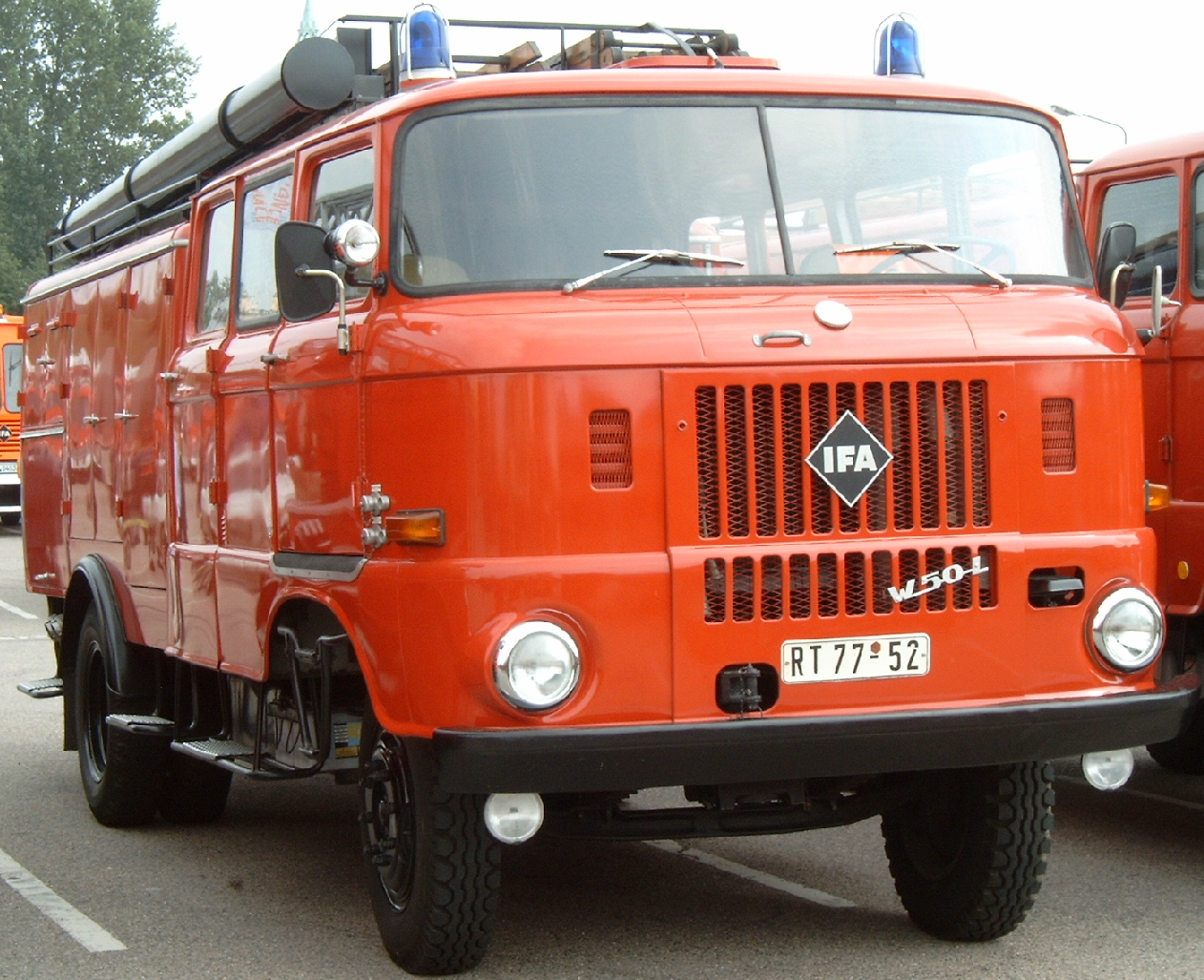
W 50 LF16 TS8 fire engine

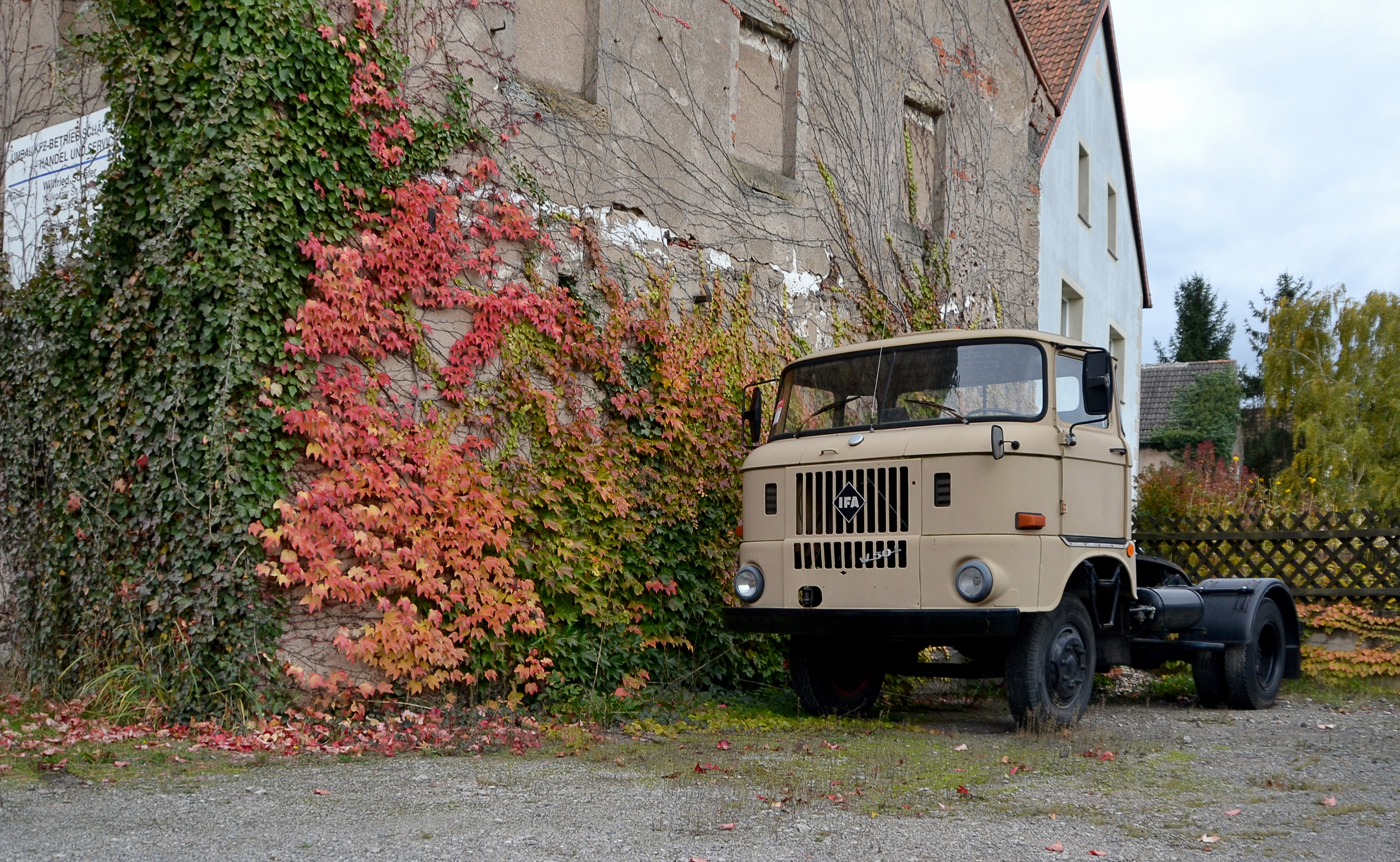
East German W50 LS tractor unit

== Design ==
Built on a 3.2 m (10 ft) wheelbase, a plethora of different versions (about sixty different models were available directly, with other firms able to produce special versions) were developed over the years. Two wheelbases were available, 3.2 and 3.7 m (10 and 12 ft). Right-hand-drive models were built for export and for special uses such as street sweeping. The W 50 was also popular with fire departments, especially as the LF16 TS8 pumper, and many examples were still in service in the former East Germany.

As required by the original brief, however, the engine was standardized: for the first two years, it was a revised version of the unit used in the IFA S4000-1: the 110 PS (81 kW) swirl chamber diesel was called "4 KVD 14,5/12". In 1967 a direct injection version of this diesel four-cylinder replaced it. As with the earlier version, the "4VD 14,5/12-1 SRW" displaces 6.56 L (400 cu in) but here it produces 125 PS (92 kW) at 2300 rpm. The engine was built by VEB IFA Motorenwerk Nordhausen in the eponymous town. After 1973 the slightly modified "4 VD 14,5/12-2" replaced it. The new version was a better cold starter and remained operational in temperatures down to −40 °C (−40 °F), as per the requirements of the NVA.

All W50 trucks were fitted with a single-disc dry clutch and have a mechanically operated five-speed gearbox with synchromesh in gears 2 to 5. All-wheel drive models have a transfer case with a lockable differential.

Hungarian bus manufacturer Ikarus also manufactured a rear-engined midibus called the 211, which used a variety of W 50 parts including the engine and axles. It was built from 1976 until 1990, when the demise of the W 50 meant that it had to be discontinued.

== Technical specifications ==
Technical specifications
	IFA W50 L (1965–1967)	IFA W50 L (1967–1990)
Engine	4 KVD 14,5/12 SRW	4 VD 14,5/12-1 SRW
Layout and operating principle	Straight-four Diesel engine, water-cooled	
Injection system	Swirl chamber injection	M-System
Bore × Stroke	120 × 145 mm	
Displacement	6.56 L	
Rated power (DIN 70020)	110 PS (81 kW) at 2200 rpm	125 PS (92 kW) at 2300 rpm
Max. torque (DIN 70020)	40 kp⋅m (392 N⋅m) at 1400 rpm	43 kp⋅m (422 N⋅m) at 1350 rpm
Electrical system	12 V	
Wheelbase	3200 mm	
Track width	1700/1778 mm	
Length × Width × Height	6530 × 2500 × 2600 mm	
Ground clearance	300 mm	
Mass	4600 kg	4400 kg
Payload	5200 kg	5300 kg
Max. permissible mass	9800 kg	10200 kg
Tyres	8.25–20″	
Top speed	83 km/h	90 km/h
Fuel tank	100 L	150 L (from 1982)

== Replacement ==
After the launch of the W 50, IWL undertook development work to increase engine power and reduce fuel consumption, reduce empty weight and increase payload, improve reliability and driver comfort and reduce production time. From 1967 IWL was planning a range of new trucks with sizes of three, five, six and 10 tonnes. Two prototypes were built: a three-tonne truck code-numbered 1013 followed by an 11-tonne one code-numbered 1118. After a protracted development, the 1118 became the IFA L 60, which was originally intended to have a Volvo cab. In the end, the L 60 was given a cab based on that of the W 50, but able to be tilted forward for access to the engine. The L 60 was finally unveiled to the public at the Autumn Leipzig Trade Fair in September 1986 and its series production began at Ludwigsfelde in June 1987, twenty years after development work had begun. As a result of slow sales of the L 60, IWL kept the W 50 in production alongside the L 60 until 1990.

== Production ==
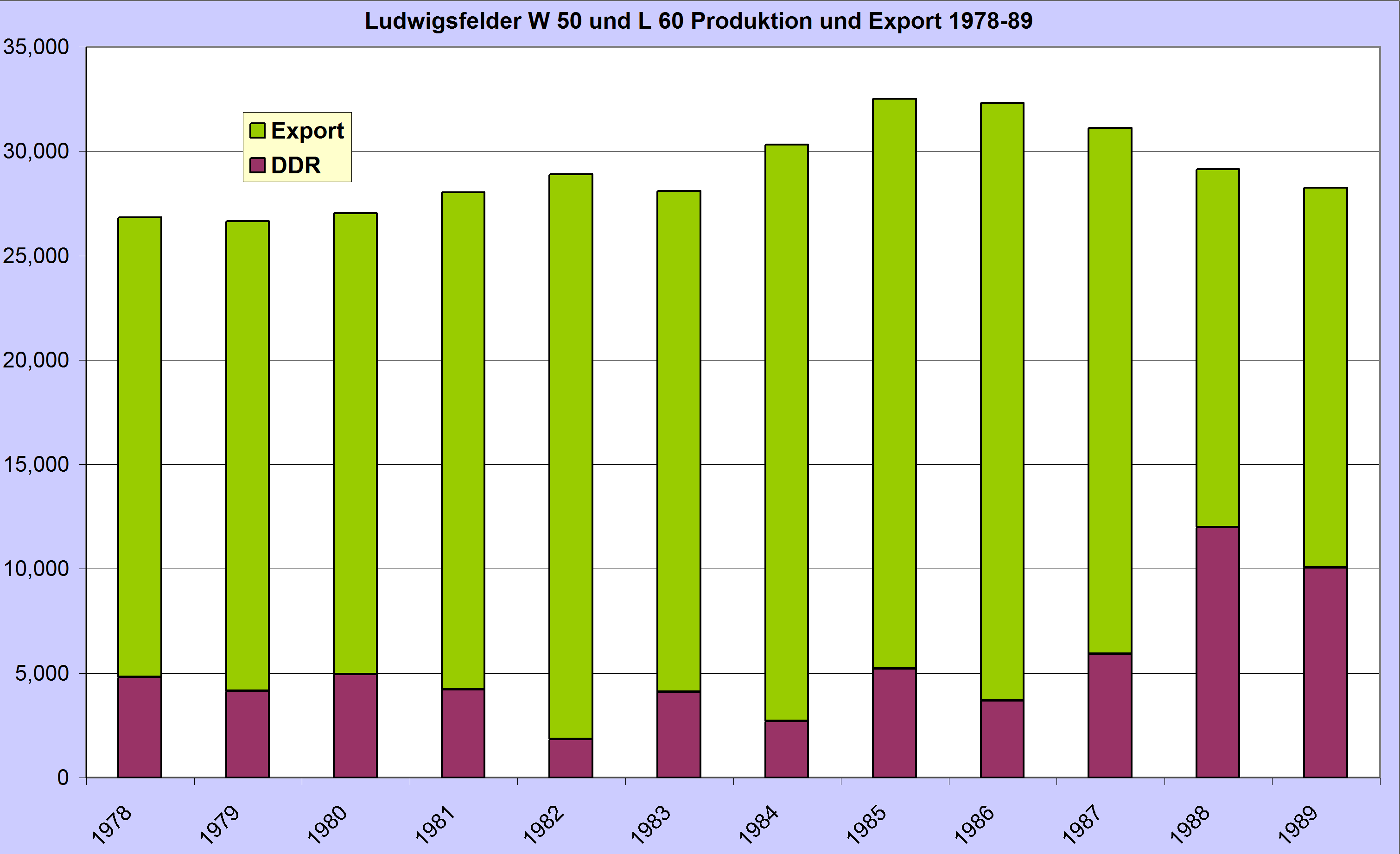
Ludwigsfelde truck deliveries 1978–90: export sales in light green; domestic sales in dark red.

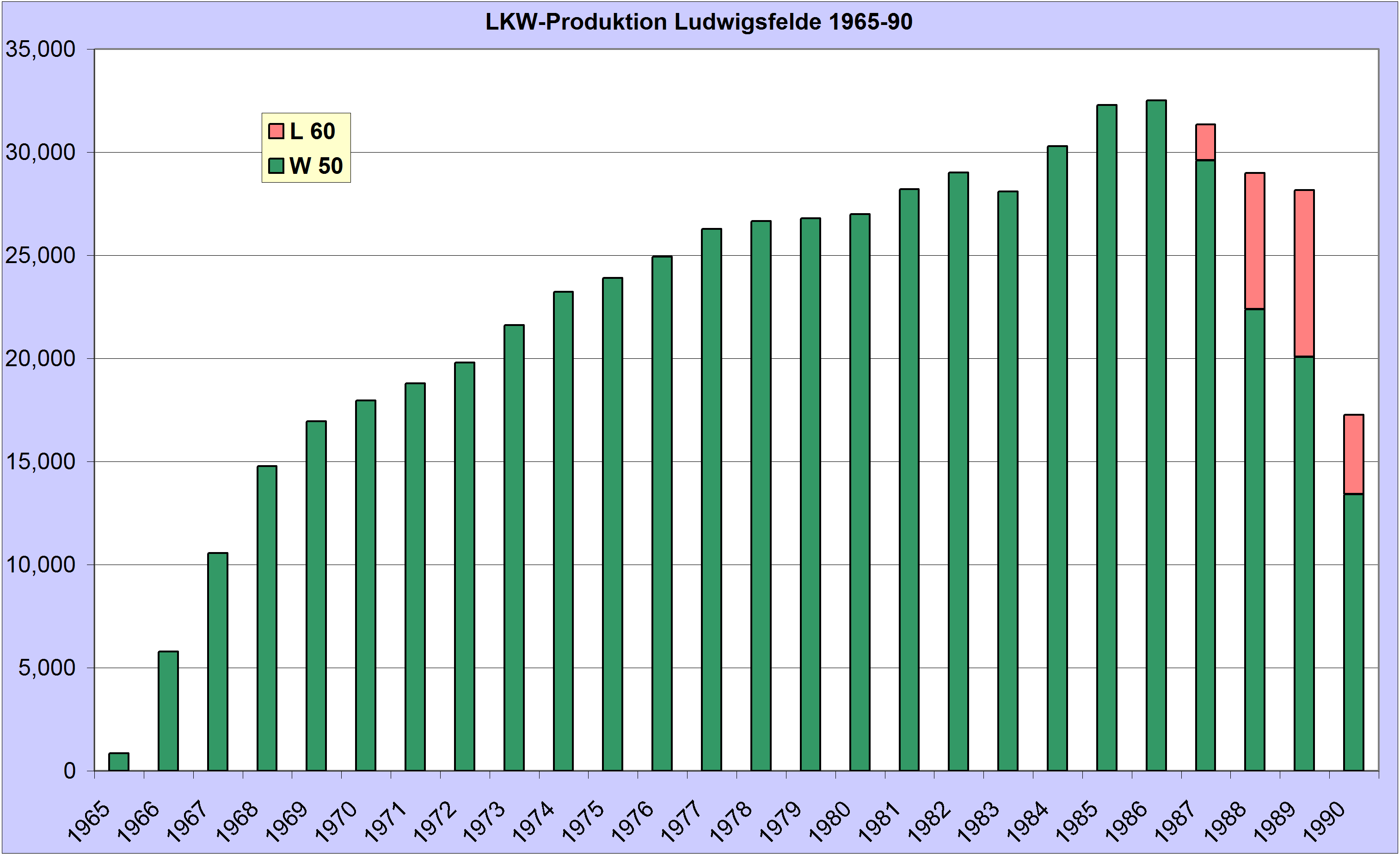
Ludwigsfelde truck production 1965–90: W 50 in dark green; L 60 in pale red.

== Bibliography ==
- Kirchberg, Peter (2000). Plaste Blech und Planwirtschaft — Die Geschichte des Automobilbaus in der DDR [Plastic, metal plate, and planned economy: the history of automobile construction in the GDR] (in German). Berlin: Nicolaische Verlagsbuchhandlung Beuermann GmbH. ISBN 3-87584-027-5.
