= Gutes Design =

East German design award (1978 to 1990)

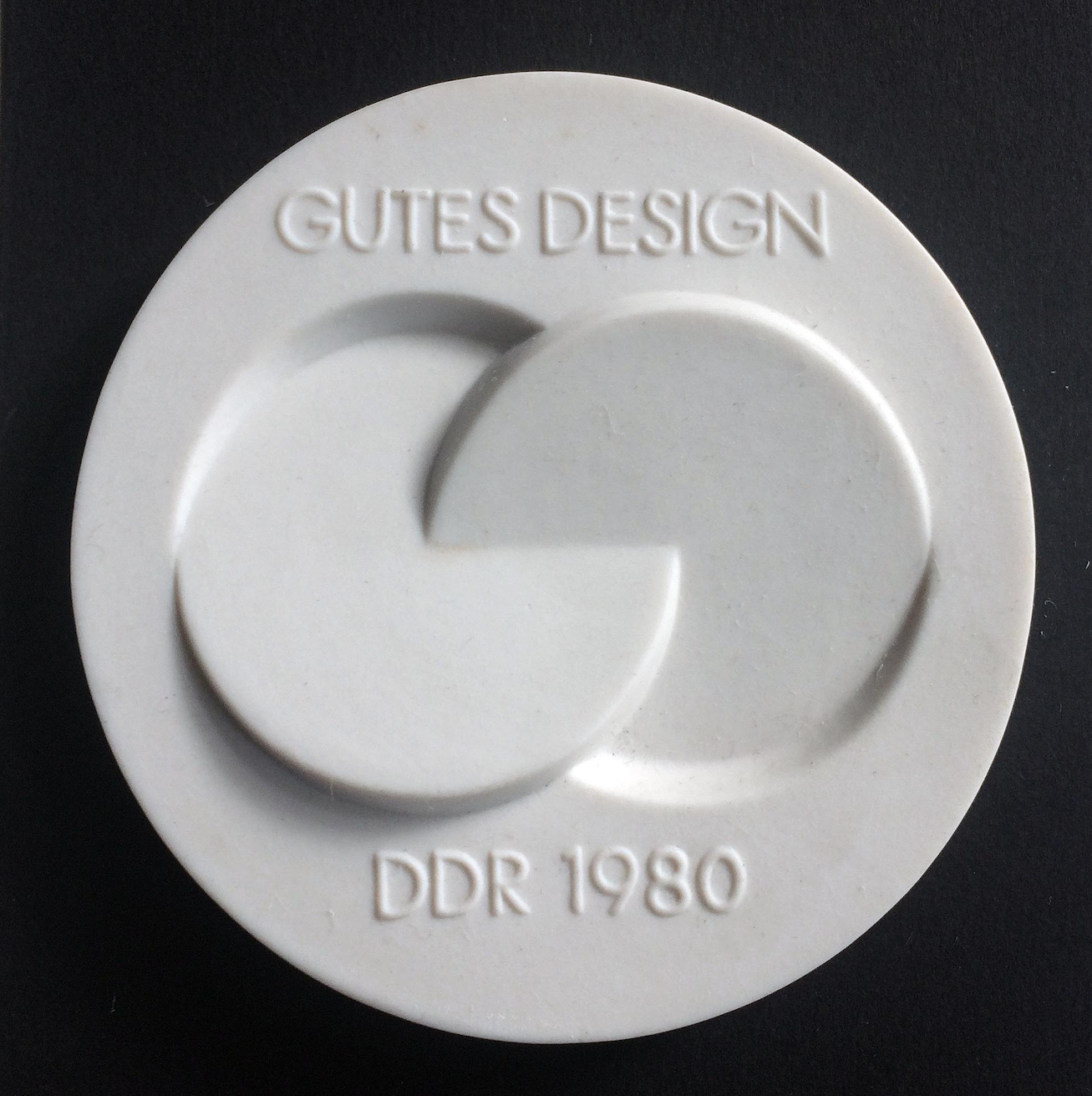
Front of the plaque made of Meissner porcelain, award year 1980

The Gutes Design award (od 'Good Design', and sometimes stylized as 'GUTES DESIGN') was a state award of East Germany for industrial products with outstanding industrial design. The award was established by the East German State Council, and was presented twice yearly from 1978 to 1990 by the Amt für industrielle Formgestaltung (transl. Office for industrial Design) at the Leipziger Trade Fair.

== History ==
The Gutes Design award was given to "excellently designed mass--produced goods" and was presented to the manufacturing compaines and combines. The award was established by the East German State Council and from 1978 on presented twice a year by the Amt für Industrielle Formgestaltung (AiF). The awards ceremony took place at the Leipziger Spring and Autumn Fairs. The winning products were published in the Form und Zweck magazine, and the designers involved were also named alongside the product and the manufacturing company.

Despite the mentioning of the designers, the "Gutes Design" award was primarily a product award, similar to the West German design prize Gute Form. The goal was to increase the competitiveness of East German industry, particularly for export goods. However, outstanding designers were personally awarded the <i>Designpreis der DDR</i> prize.

The last presentation of the Gutes Design award was made in the Leipzig spring fair of 1990.

== Logo and plaque ==
The joint logo of the design prize, the design promotion prize, and the Gutes Design award was designed by Dietrich Otte based on the work Verklammerte Kreisscheiben (transl. Clamped Circular Discs) by Hermann Glöckner. The plaque for the product award was made of Meissen porcellain and was displayed at the Leipzig Fair among the award-winning machines and products. The front of the plaque featured the logo, abiv it the inscription "GUTES DESIGN", and below it "DDR" and the year of the award. The products and their packaging could also bear the logo, either as a sticker or a printed design.

== Awards ==
A maximum of 50 prizes were awarded at each fair, but in practice the number was more like 20 to 40. Therefore, a complete list of all award-winning products, their manufacturers, and designers is not possible. This information can be found in the footnotes of the digitized editions of form+zweck, which include a breakdown by category and—for example—particularly well-known products among those awarded. The column showing the number of prizes awarded refers only to products from the GDR, as the form+zweck journal does not fully list the prizes awarded to international submissions from 1988 onward.

Year	Fair	Prizes	Notes
1978	Spring	50	First awards.
1978	Spring	42	First awards with logo. 6 of the prizes went to capital goods, 9 to medical technology, and 25 to consumer goods, including the Simson S 50 moped.
1979	Spring	40	There were 65 nominations. 28 prizes went to consumer goods, 12 to capital goods, including the cargo ship type UL-ESC.
1979	Autumn	37	There were 150 nominations. Consumer goods predominated among the 37 prizes, including writing instruments, among others from Markant and Heiko.
1980	Spring	32	From more than 100 nominations, 32 award winners emerged, including railway carriages from Bautzen and Görlitz.
1980	Autumn	30	More than 100 nominations; among the 30 award winners were 26 consumer goods, including a particularly large number of textiles and clothing.
1981	Spring	22	In addition to the 22 prizes, commendations were awarded for the first time, as a level below "Good Design".
1981	Autumn	23	Of the 23 prizes, 21 went to consumer goods, including the HiFi radio RS 5001 from Robotron with speakers B 9271.
1982	Spring	24	The 24 prizes were mostly awarded to capital goods, including the Mähdrescher E 514 and the Elektrolok 212/243.
1982	Autumn	25	There were 83 applications, of the 25 prizes 21 went to consumer products, including the COLORMAT 4506 color television from Staßfurt.
1983	Spring	28	Of 89 nominations, 28 products were awarded, 24 of which were consumer products.
1984	Spring	26	Capital goods received 8 prizes, consumer products 18, including the ink artist lin's.
1984	Autumn	22	Consumer products received awards across the board, including the MDW 90 furniture range.
1985	Spring	20	Among the 20 prizes were 9 capital goods, including a large-capacity passenger train carriage from Bautzen.
1985	Autumn	22	18 of the prizes were consumer goods, including the Kumitate tea service from the Meissen porcelain manufactory.
1986	Spring	23	The largest award-winning product was a second-class open-plan carriage from Bautzen, the smallest the VERO SCOLA 1+1 wooden toy.
1986	Autumn	14	In addition to the 14 prizes, there were 10 commendations.
1987	Spring	16	Of the 16 prizes, 8 went to capital goods and 8 to consumer goods; in addition, there were five commendations.
1987	Autumn	19	In addition to the 19 awards (including for the Vermona stereo keyboard SK 86 and shanty jeans), there were five commendations.
1988	Spring	20	First international competition. 20 of the prizes went to East German products, including the Robotron EC 1834. Among the Western prize winners was the Atari ST.
1988	Autumn	16	Second international competition, 16 of the prizes went to East German products. Among the Western prize winners was a Discman from Sony.
1989	Spring	32	Third international competition, 32 of the prizes went to GDR products: 12 to capital goods, 20 to consumer goods.

== Literature ==
- Christian Wölfel, Sylvia Wölfel u. Jens Krzywinski (Hrsg.): Gutes Design. Martin Kelm und die Designförderung in der DDR. Thelem Universitätsverlag, Dresden 2014. ISBN 978-3-945363-11-9.
- Leiter des Amtes für industrielle Formgestaltung, Leiter des Leipziger Messeamtes: Richtlinie für die Teilnahme der Betriebe am Wettbewerb GUTES DESIGN. In: form+zweck, 20. Jahrgang, Heft 5/1988, urn:urn:nbn:de:bsz:14-db-id416501729-198800502:{{{2}}}, S. 3–4.
- Bernd Havenstein, Peter Raasch: GUTES DESIGN – Ergebnisse und Tendenzen. In: form+zweck, 15. Jahrgang, Heft 6/1983, urn:urn:nbn:de:bsz:14-db-id416501729-198300601:{{{2}}}, S. 43–51.

== See also ==
- List of design awards
- Red Dot Design Award
