= Fortschritt E 510 =

- Type: Combine harvester
- Manufacturer: VEB Mähdrescherwerk Bischofswerda/Singwitz
- Production: Singwitz, GDR; 1963 (Only pre-production samples built)
- Length: 7100 mm
- Width: 3800 mm
- Height: 3600 mm
- Weight: 5300 kg
- Propulsion: Tyres 14–24 AS (front), 10–15 AM (rear)
- Engine model: AM 4–15–5 (Straight-four Diesel, 6.024 dm^{3})
- Flywheel power: 44 or 55 kW
- Speed: 1.67…17.72 km/h
- Preceded by: Fortschritt E 170 series
- Succeeded by: Fortschritt E 512

The Fortschritt E 510 was a self-propelled combine harvester, developed in the early 1960s by the East-German Fortschritt combine. It was a heavy modification of its predecessor, the Fortschritt E 170 series. Several E 510 combines were made for testing purposes; however, the tests which were conducted in the 1963 harvesting season showed that, the E 510 was no improvement over the E 170 series. Despite having developed the E 510 to a point where it was ready to go into series production, the E 510's series production never commenced, and the E 510 was cancelled. Instead, Fortschritt developed a completely new combine harvester, the Fortschritt E 512.

== Development ==
The E 170 series combines, which had been in production since 1954, proved to be not well-suited for the growing East-German Agricultural Production Cooperatives, because of their high corn loss, poor ergonomics, and aging design; in addition to that, the E 170 series combines had a small header, a small corn tank, and no continuously variable transmission (CVT). Therefore, Fortschritt sought to replace the aging E 170 series with a new, more efficient model. Development began in 1962. The new model – designated the E 510 – was basically a heavy modification of the ongoing E 170 series. The E 510 had a header that was approximately 200 mm wider, a bigger corn tank with an improved unloading mechanism, a three-speed gearbox with an additional CVT, and the 44 kW engine from the E 175. It was considered upgrading the engine even further to 55 kW. After a series of tests conducted in the 1963 harvesting season, where the E 510 had to compete against several combine harvesters from Western countries, it became obvious that it was not a significant improvement over the E 170 series. Therefore, it was decided in February 1964, not to put the E 510 into series production. From 1964 to 1968, a new combine harvester was developed, the Fortschritt E 512. It was later put into series production instead of the E 510. Only a few pre-production units of the E 510 were made.
