= Neringa =

Neringa may refer to:

- Neringa Municipality, a municipality in Lithuania
- Neringa (Klaipėda), a city district of Klaipėda, Lithuania
- Neringa (giant), a character in Baltic mythology
- Neringa (name), Lithuanian female name
- BK-6 Neringa, Lithuanian glider
- Neringa (production association), Lithuanian toy manufacturer
