= Oktyabr Plant (Vinnytsia) =

- Native name: МЭП, В-2396, ОАО «Винницкий ламповый завод» / Винницкое производственное объединение "Октябрь" / Вінницький ламповий завод
- Type: State-owned enterprise (defunct)
- Industry: Semiconductor, Microelectronics, Vacuum electronics
- Predecessor: Post Office Box No. 26 (п/я № 26)
- Founded: 1961
- Defunct: c. 1990s
- Fate: Defunct following the dissolution of the Soviet Union
- Headquarters: Vinnytsia, Ukrainian SSR (1961–1991); Ukraine (1991–early 2000s)
- Products: Integrated circuits, transistors, vacuum tubes, VFD indicators
- Number of employees: 5,000 (1995)

The Oktyabr Plant, also known historically as the Vinnytsia Tube Plant (Ukrainian: Вінницький ламповий завод; Russian: Винницкий ламповый завод), was a major Soviet electronics manufacturer located in Vinnytsia, Ukrainian SSR (modern-day Ukraine).

During the Cold War, the plant served as a core element of the Soviet radio-electronic and military-industrial complex, specializing in the mass fabrication of integrated circuits (ICs), semiconductor components, and high-frequency vacuum tubes.

== History ==
=== Foundation and expansion (1961–1970) ===
The facility was established in 1961 on the former grounds of a military non-commissioned officer school and logistical depot between the Tyazhyliv and Second Military Town microdistricts of Vinnytsia. To maintain Soviet military secrecy, the factory was initially given the classified cover designation Post Office Box No. 26 (Russian: предприятие "почтовый ящик № 26").

In April 1963, the facility commenced commercial manufacturing of its first batches of electronic components. Around this time, oversight was officially transferred to the State Committee for Electronic Technology of the USSR (GKET). The campus expanded rapidly through the 1960s, constructing multi-story production lines. In 1966 the factory got its official name "Vinnytsia Radio Tube Plant".

=== Peak operations and microelectronics (1970–1989) ===
Originally designed to produce receiver-amplifier vacuum tubes, the factory pivoted aggressively into solid-state microelectronics during the Soviet computing boom. It was reorganized into the Production Association "Oktyabr" (PO Oktyabr), integrating multiple local design bureaus and assembly lines under unified management.

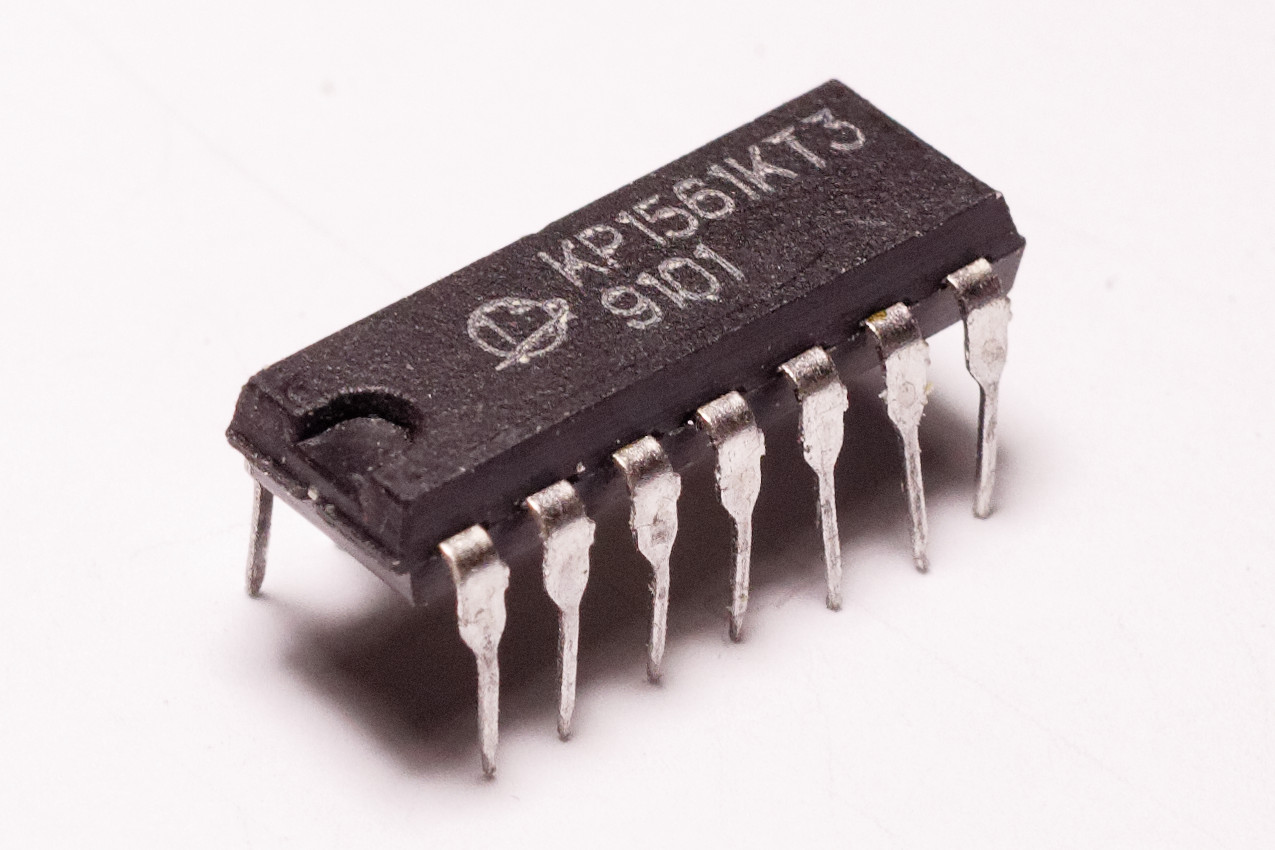
Integrated circuits, КР1561КТ3 (CD4066), clones of the 4000 CMOS series

By the late 1970s and 1980s, the plant was a source for Soviet CMOS logic integrated circuits, supplying parts for aviation, telecommunications, and industrial automation equipment. At its height, the enterprise employed close to 11,000 of local technicians, engineers, and specialists.

=== Post-Soviet decline and closure ===
Following the dissolution of the Soviet Union in 1991, Production Association "Oktyabr" lost its massive state-mandated defense contracts. Under newly independent Ukraine's transition to a market economy, the factory struggled to compete with highly advanced global semiconductor foundries. Financial difficulties led to a cessation of manufacturing operations in the late 1990s; in 1997 bankruptcy proceedings began. The factory complex was subsequently shuttered, and sections of the real estate were liquidated or converted for commercial retail use by October 2010.

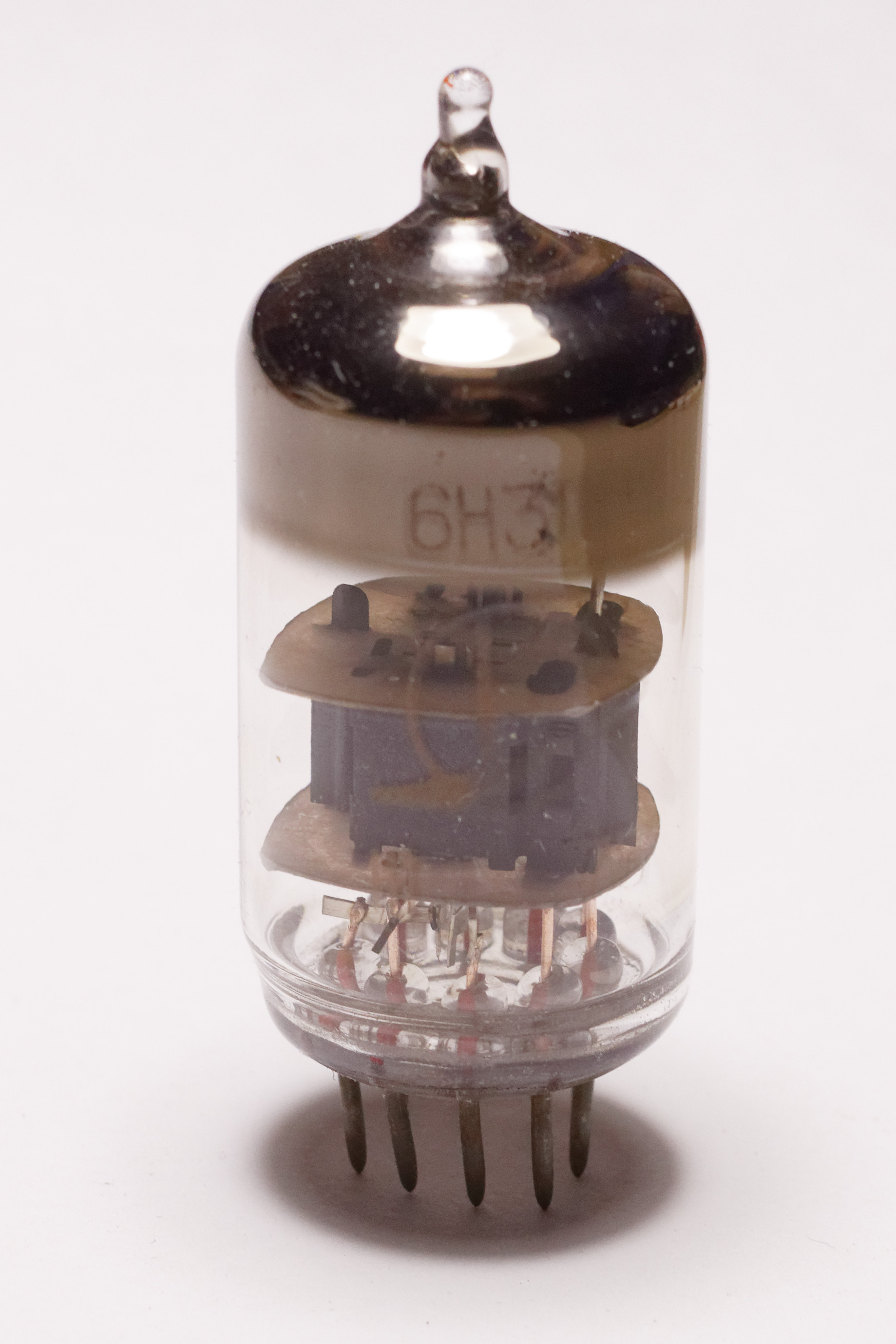
6Н3П (6N3P) double triode, base version, made in Vinnitsa in 1975

== Products ==
- Vacuum electronics
  - High-precision receiving, amplifying, and switching vacuum tubes including types 6F1P, 6K13P, 6F5P, 6Zh5P, 1Ts21P
  - vacuum fluorescent displays (VFD) used in consumer clocks and instrumentation
  - fluorescent lamps.
- Integrated circuits
  - Mass production of early hybrid micro-modules (such as the 235 and 261 series: K284KN1A, K561TR2, K561PU4, K561LE10) and standard CMOS digital logic logic gates (including the K561 series), which were direct Soviet analogues to Western CD4000 series components.
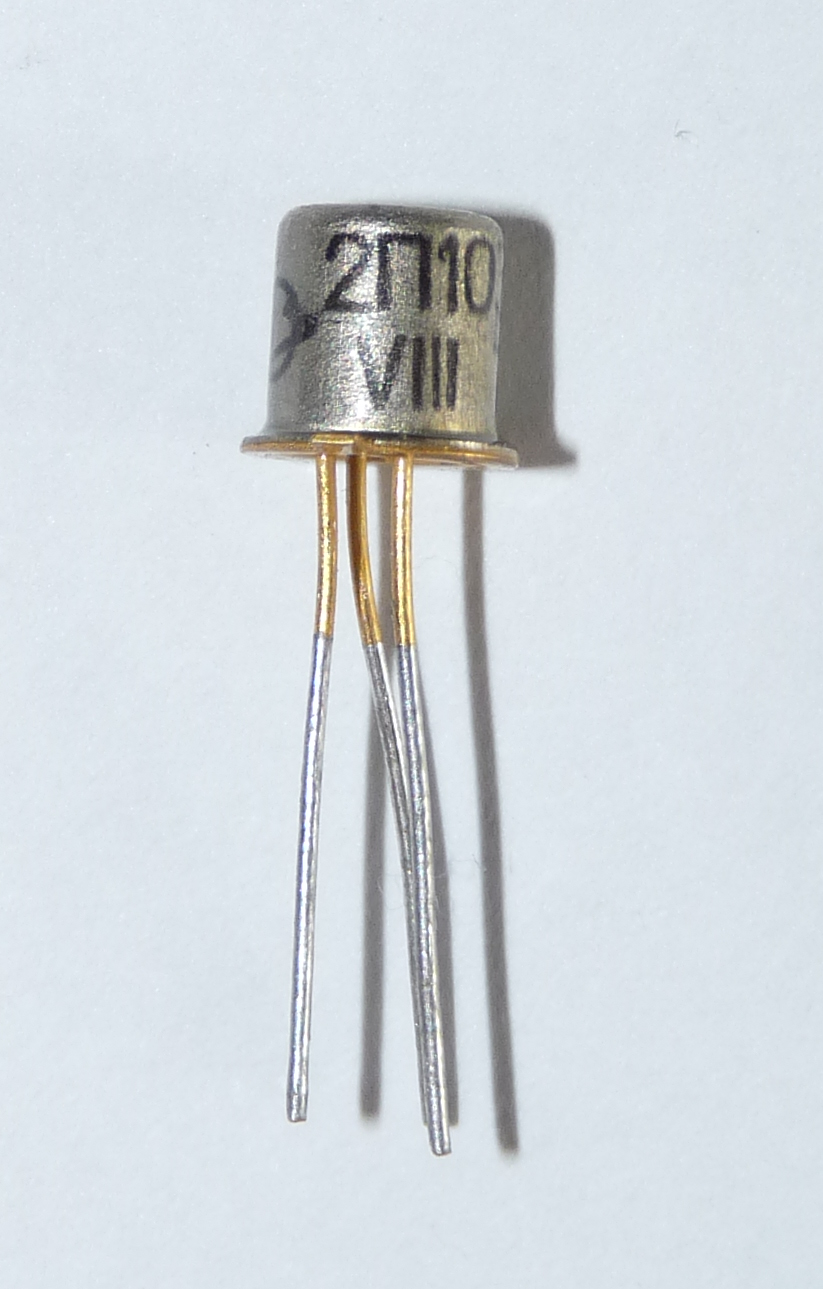
- P-FET transistor 2П103Б
  Discrete semiconductors
  - Bipolar and field-effect transistors built for high-reliability consumer and industrial devices.

== Factory markings ==
Components manufactured by the plant are recognized in the vintage electronics community by its distinct stylized logo. The asset stamp depicts a modified, continuous geometric line shape that represents the Cyrillic characters "ОВ" (transliterated to "OV"), honoring its geographical roots in Oktyabr Vinnytsia.

== See also ==
- Angstrem (company)
- Mikron Group
