= Fortschritt E 516 =

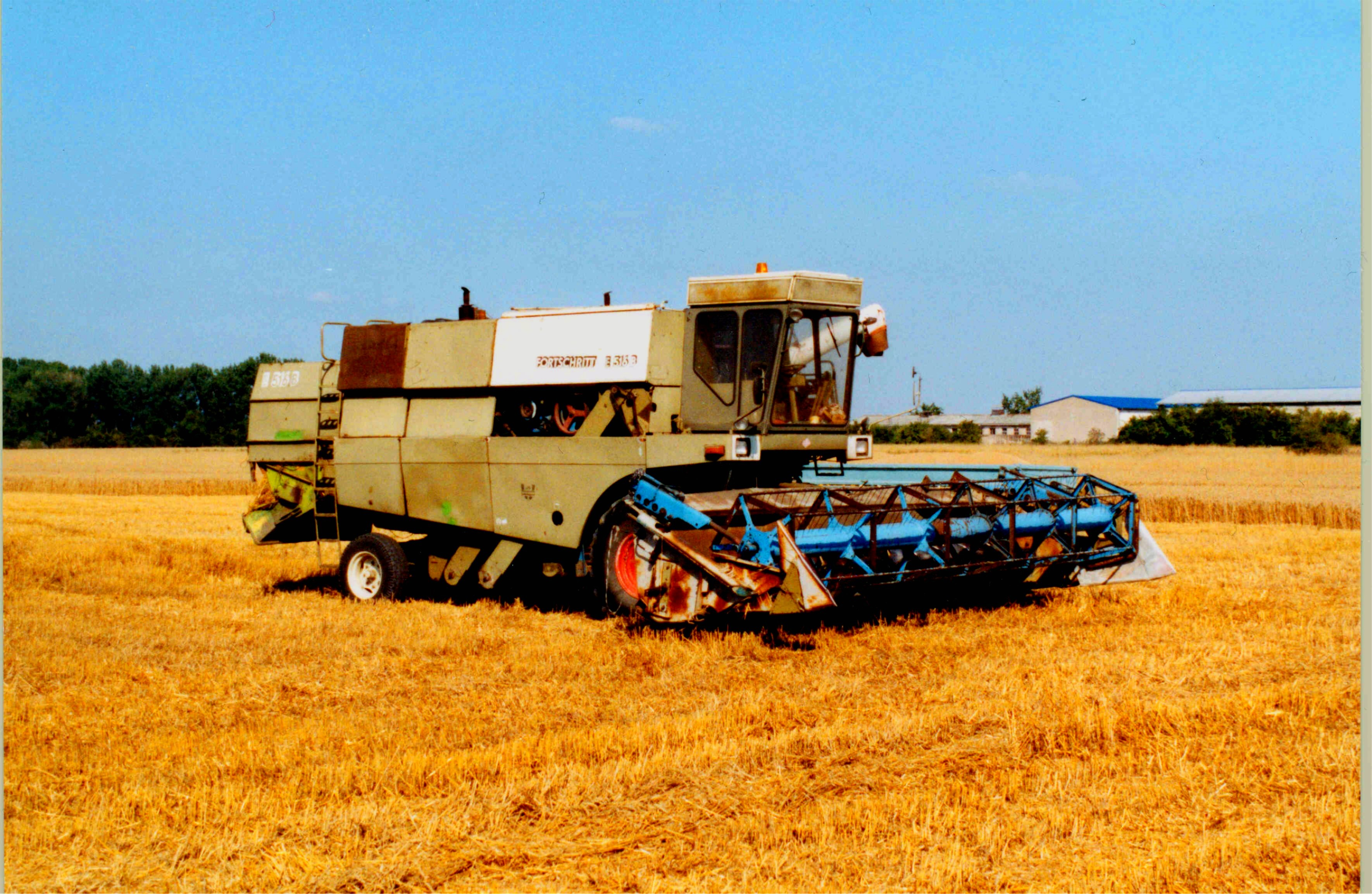
- Fortschritt E 516 B
- Type: Agricultural
- Manufacturer: VEB Mähdrescherwerk Bischofswerda/Singwitz
- Production: 1977–1988
- Length: 8690 mm
- Width: 3200 mm (with 22.1/18–26 AS tyres)
- Height: 3980 mm (including flashing beacon)
- Weight: 10,020 kg (with 22.1/18–26 AS tyres)
- Propulsion: Tyres
- Engine model: 8 VD 14,5/12,5-1 SVW
- Flywheel power: 162 kW (prototypes); 168 kW (series production models)
- Speed: 0…20 km/h (continuously variable hydraulic transmission)
- Preceded by: Fortschritt E 512
- Succeeded by: Fortschritt E 517

The Fortschritt E 516 is a self-propelled combine harvester made by VEB Mähdrescherwerk Bischofswerda/Singwitz. It was developed in the late 1960s and first half of the 1970s, and after extensive testing in 1975, it was put into series production in 1977. In 1983, the E 516's second generation, the Fortschritt E 516 B was introduced. It was discontinued in 1988 in favour of its successor, the Fortschritt E 517.

== Technical description ==
The Fortschritt E 516 is a conventional straw-walker combine harvester, and has front-wheel drive with a continuously variable hydraulic transmission. The corn passes through the E 516 in longitudinal fashion. This means that it enters the combine in front, and gets pulled into the mid-mounted threshing drum; the straw exits the machine in back, after getting cleaned in the straw walkers, which are installed in the E 516's rear compartment. The Fortschritt E 516 can be used for several different types of corn; it can be used on slopes with an angle of up to 9.45°. From the factory, 6.7 m (22 ft) and 7.6 m (25 ft) headers, as well as 6 and 8 row maize-picker huskers were available. The E 516's rated corn performance is 14,000 kg/h.

The threshing drum has a width of 1625 mm and a diameter of 800 mm. It is equipped with 10 rasp bars. It is driven by a belt that is hydraulically adjustable in length (continuously variable transmission), in order to adjust the threshing drum speed. The speed is adjustable between 530 and 955 min^{−1}. The concave has an angle of 120°, 16 rasp bars, and an area of 1.43 m^{2}. Its distance from the threshing drum can be quickly adjusted in three steps using a lever in the driver's cabin; fine adjusting is possible with a knob next to the lever. The E 516 has five straw walkers with seven steps each; the total straw walker aera is 7.68 m^{2}.

The E 516 is powered by an IFA 8 VD 14,5/12,5-1 SVW four-stroke diesel engine. This engine is a naturally aspirated, water-cooled pushrod V8, with two camshafts, and four crossflow cylinder heads. It has a helix-controlled inline injection pump, and direct injection with hyperboloid-like shaped combustion chambers. With a cylinder bore of 125 mm and a stroke of 145 mm, it displaces 14.23 dm^{3}. The prototype versions were rated 162 kW at 2200 min^{−1}; the E 516's series production version had an output of 168 kW at 2200 min^{−1} and produced a maximum torque of 961 N·m at 1400 min^{−1}. The E 516 B's 8 VD 14,5/12,5-1 SVW engine had a reduced speed of 2000 min^{−1}, but was still rated 168 kW.

== Fortschritt E 516 B ==
A series of tests, conducted during the 1980 corn harvesting season with several E 516 combines, equipped with Rába-made MAN D 2156 MT 6 and 8 VD 14,5/12,5-1 SVW engines, showed that reducing the 8 VD 14,5/12,5-1 SVW's engine speed by 200 min^{−1} would result in a reduction in fuel consumption of up to 15 %. The updated 8 VD 14,5/12,5-1 SVW engine was installed in the E 516's second generation, the E 516 B. According to the manufacturer, the series production E 516 B has 10 % less fuel consumption whilst retaining the full engine power, compared to the first generation E 516. In addition to the updated engine, the E 516 B received new portal axles, new tyres, an improved cabine ventilation system, and an engine start protection system to prevent engine starting without the drive lever being in the neutral position.
