= Heinz Hirdina =

East German design theorist and editor (1942–2013)

Heinz Hirdina (5 March 1942 – 19 December 2013 in Berlin) was an East German design theorist and editor.

== Life and career ==
Heinz Hirdina studied philosophy and cultural studies in Jena, Leipzig and Berlin from 1961 to 1966. Until 1968 he worked as an editor for the newspaper "Sonntag" and for Aufbau-Verlag, Berlin. This was followed by collaboration with the design magazine Form und Zweck, of which he was editor-in-chief from 1973 to 1979. From 1980 to 1986, he was responsible for the editing of design publications at the Dresden Verlag der Kunst. After receiving his doctorate in 1973, he was tenured in 1988 and, from 1987, worked as a lecturer at the Weißensee Academy of Art Berlin. In 1993, he was offered the chair for the theory and history of design, which he held until 2005. Hirdina was married to the art and literary scholar Karin Hirdina.

== Works ==
- Design for the series Verlag der Kunst, Dresden, 1988, ISBN 3-364-00042-5
- Figur und Grund: Vorlesungen zur Geschichte und Theorie des Designs: Band I Edition Bauhaus 40, Spectormag, Leipzig, n.n., ISBN 978-3-944669-35-9
- Am Ende ist alles Design, Verlag Form + Zweck, Berlin, 2008, ISBN 978-3-935053-15-0
- Ästhetisches Formieren und Rezipieren unter den Bedingungen vergesellschafteter Arbeit und Produktion, ein Beitrag zur Ästhetik der industriellen Formgestaltung, Diss. A, Humboldt-Universität, Berlin, 1973
- Funktionalismus als Gestaltungsprinzip, Texte zur Designgeschichte, (dissertation), Humboldt-Universität, Berlin, 1988

== Publications ==
- Postmodernes Interieur (1987), in: Brecht 88 / ed. von Wolfgang Heise, S. 246–255, Berlin, 1987
- Neues Bauen, neues Gestalten : das Neue Frankfurt, die neue Stadt; eine Zeitschrift. zwischen 1926 u. 1933, Verlag der Kunst, Dresden, 1984
- 50 Jahre Bauhaus Dessau (1976), in: Form + Zweck, Nr. 6, Berlin, 1976
- Es gibt keine Konkurrenz zu uns, in: Design in Berlin, Vice Versa, Berlin, 2005, ISBN 3-932809-52-1
- Postmoderne und Funktionalismus : sechs Vorträge, mit Bruno Flierl, 1985
- Rationalisierte Hausarbeit : die Küche im Neuen Bauen, in: Jahrbuch für Volkskunde und Kulturgeschichte 26, 1983
- Die rote Linie : Heinz Hirdina über den Bedeutungswandel eines Gestaltungselements, in: Design Report, Nr. 4, S. 62–63. : Ill., Frankfurt/Main, 1994
- Die Avantgarde und der Weg nach Byzanz, Form + Zweck, Nr. 910, S. 98–117. : Ill., Berlin, 1994
- Bauhausmöbel, in: Möbel und Wohnraum 34, Nr. 5, S. 131–134, 1981
- Die Wüste und das Entwerfen : Otl Aicher und Ettore Sottsass, in: Design Report, Nr. 9, S. 42–43, Frankfurt/Main, 1995
- Die Suche nach der objektiven Form, in: Wissenschaftliche Zeitschrift der Hochschule für Architektur und Bauwesen, 29(1983), Nr. 5/6, S. 474–478. : Ill., Weimar, 1983
- ... die Schönheit darf sich niemals der Zwecke schämen, in: Form + Zweck, Nr. 5, S. 30–38, Berlin, 1987
