= Fortschritt E 162 =

1950s East German combine harvester

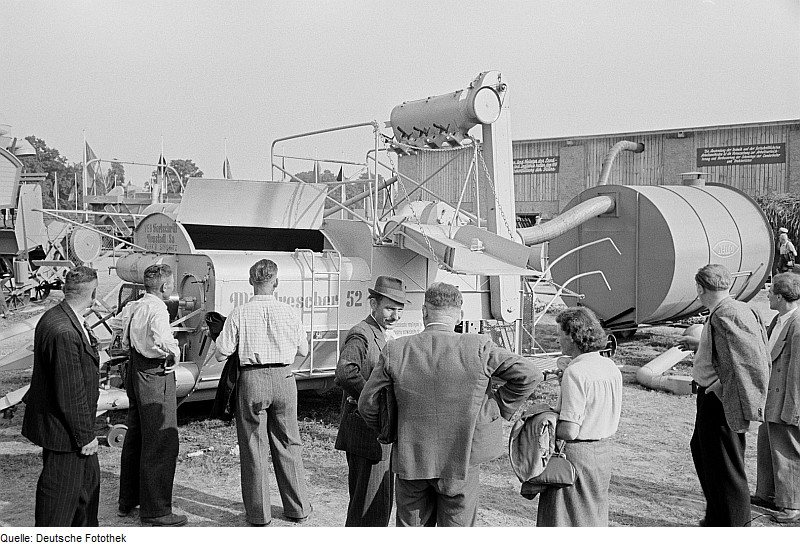
- Fortschritt E 162
- Type: Combine harvester
- Manufacturer: VEB Mähdrescherwerk Bischofswerda/Singwitz
- Production: Singwitz, GDR; 1952–1956; 54 built
- Length: 8500 mm
- Width: 4600 mm
- Height: 2800 mm
- Weight: 3000 kg
- Engine model: None (driven by tractor PTO)
- Succeeded by: Fortschritt E 170 series

The Fortschritt E 162, also known as the LBH 52 Kombinus, is a tractor-drawn combine harvester, made by the East-German manufacturer VEB Mähdrescherwerk Bischofswerda/Singwitz in Singwitz, from 1952 until 1956. In total, 54 were built. The E 162 proved to be an unreliable combine, and it was soon replaced by the Fortschritt E 170 series.

== Description ==
The E 162 is a tractor-drawn combine harvester. It has a backbone tube chassis, a single axle, two wheels, and a body made of sheet metal panels. As it does not have an engine, it is solely driven by a tractor's 540 min^{−1} PTO. When used for combine harvesting, it requires a tractor with an engine power output of approximately 29…44 kW. The power requirement for stationary threshing is lower, according to the manual, it is approximately 15 kW. All the E 162's systems are driven from the input shaft by chains, and belts. The E 162's header is not designed to be detachable quickly, but it can be folded. Its cutting width is 2100 mm (7 ft). The header mowing height, and reel height can be adjusted with hand cranks. Both the cutting speed and reel speed are fixed. The material passes through the E 162 from the header, which is mounted on the E 162's right hand side, to the longitudinally installed threshing drum inside the combine's body. The threshing drum has a length of 1250 mm and a width of 500 mm; it has 7 rasp bars. Its speed is adjustable between 850 and 1500 min^{−1} by altering the drive belt pulley distance with the adjusting screws and a jaw spanner. The concave has a 130° angle, and 12 steel bars. The distance between threshing drum and concave can be finely adjusted using levers. The E 162 does not have secondary material processing systems such as rotors or straw walkers. Instead, the straw, which makes a 90° turn after it comes out of the threshing drum, falls on two finely perforated conveyor belts, that transport the straw away from the threshing drum to the straw baler, which is installed in the E 162's rear compartment. Corn, that has not yet been threshed out of the straw, can fall through the conveyor belts onto the pan. The corn cleaning system works with two sieves, and a fan. Chaff is sucked out of the combine and collected in a separate chaff waggon. An auger transports the corn to the combine's roof, where the secondary sorting system is installed. It consists of rotating sorting cylinders. From these cylinders, the corn is filled into jute sacks, according to the corn size. Up to 600 kg of corn can be stored on the E 162's roof.
