= EC 1834 =

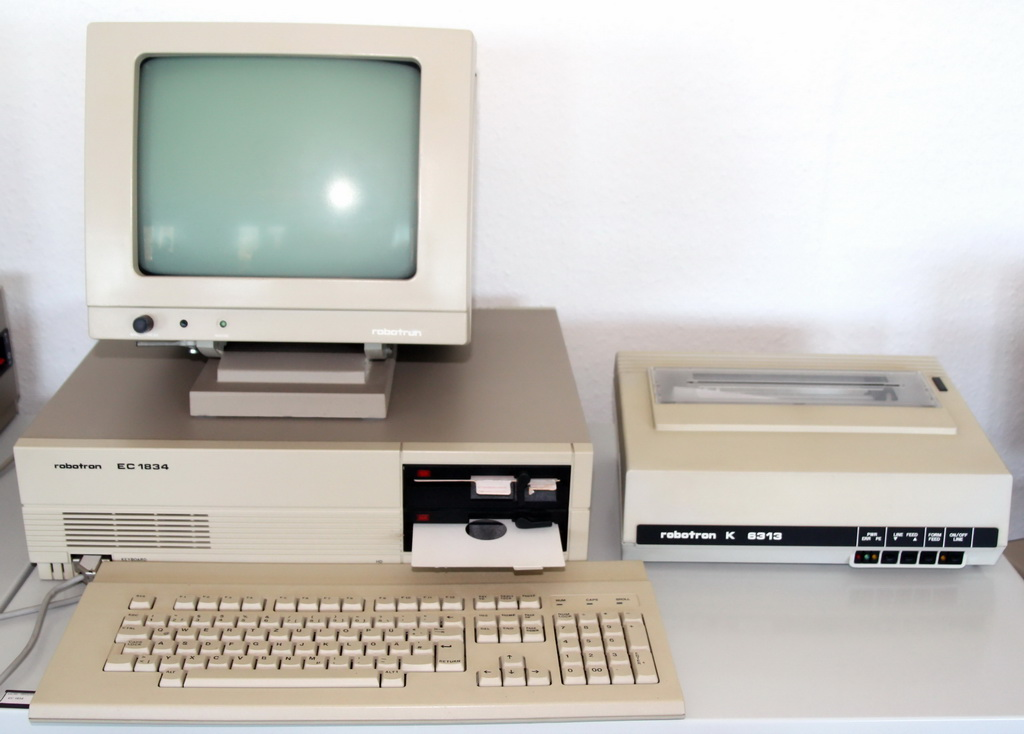
- EC 1834 with a K 7229.25 display and a K 6313 printer.
- Manufacturer: VEB Robotron
- Type: Personal computer
- Released: 1988; 38 years ago
- Units shipped: approx. 34,000
- Operating system: DCP, MUTOS1834 (CPM-86 / MS-DOS compatible)
- CPU: K1810WM86 (8086-compatible)
- Graphics: U82720
- Predecessor: A 7100; A 7150
- Successor: EC 1835 (prototype only)

The EC 1834 personal computer was developed and manufactured in the DDR by VEB Robotron-Elektronik in Dresden, Fachgebiet Geräte E2 in Karl-Marx-Stadt (present-day Chemnitz) as principal developers, together with VEB Buchungsmaschinenwerk Karl-Marx-Stadt and VEB Robotron-Büromaschinenwerk "Ernst Thälmann" in Sömmerda. Around 34,000 EC 1834 computers were built, as well as 120 functional prototypes of the EC 1834.01/EC 1834.M model.

== Hardware ==
The Robotron EC 1834 (designed by the Robotron collective) received a Good Design Award at the Leipzig Fair in spring of 1988. The EC 1834 was an IBM-PC-XT-compatible PC, equipped with an Intel-8086-compatible CPU K1810WM86 clocked at 4.9152 MHz. It had a socket for a math coprocessor, for which either a K1810WM87 or Intel 8087 could be used. It was equipped with two 5.25" floppy disk drives (double sided with a capacity of 720 KB), a hard disk drive (usually 20 MB, but sometimes also 40 MB, of which initially only 32 MB were accessible), and had 256 kB of main memory. The main memory could be expanded to 640 kB -- the limit of conventional memory at the time.

PCs in the first production run were sometimes shipped without a hard drive but with up to four diskette drives. Some PCs with a hard drive only had one floppy disk drive. There were also reportedly some units with two hard disk drives installed. In addition to the Robotron K 5504.20 / K 5504.50 drives, Bulgarian and "Western imports" (including MFM drives from Seagate) were also used.

The graphics controller was a U82720. The EC 1834 could optionally be equipped with a color graphics adapter, which was also developed by Robotron. This was compatible with the CGA standard via an emulation layer. Computer games written close to the hardware ran without issue on this emulation, unlike on the IBM VGA card. The following resolution modes were supported:

- 320 × 200 with 4 colors (CGA compatible)
- 640 × 200 monochrome
- 640 × 400 monochrome
- 640 × 480 with 16 colors from a palette of 4,096 colors(3x 4 bit)

== Operating system and software ==
The EC 1834 ran either Disk Control Program (DCP) versions 3.20 or 3.30, or the UNIX clone MUTOS1834. Alternatively, the EC 1834 could also be operated with CP/M-86 or MS-DOS.

== Predecessors and successors ==
The EC 1834 was intended to replace the much more expensive and material intensive A 7100 (incompatible with the IBM-XT) and A 7150 (compatible with IBM XT through a slow graphics emulation layer.

In 1988, development began on a IBM AT-compatible successor, the EC 1835. However, this computer, which was intended to be equipped with a U80601 processor, never reached mass production. Only about twenty functional prototypes of this successor were built.

== Literature ==
- Der Personalcomputer EC 1834. Verlag Die Wirtschaft. ISBN 3-349-00574-8. (PDF)
