= Fortschritt E 512 =

East German combine harvester

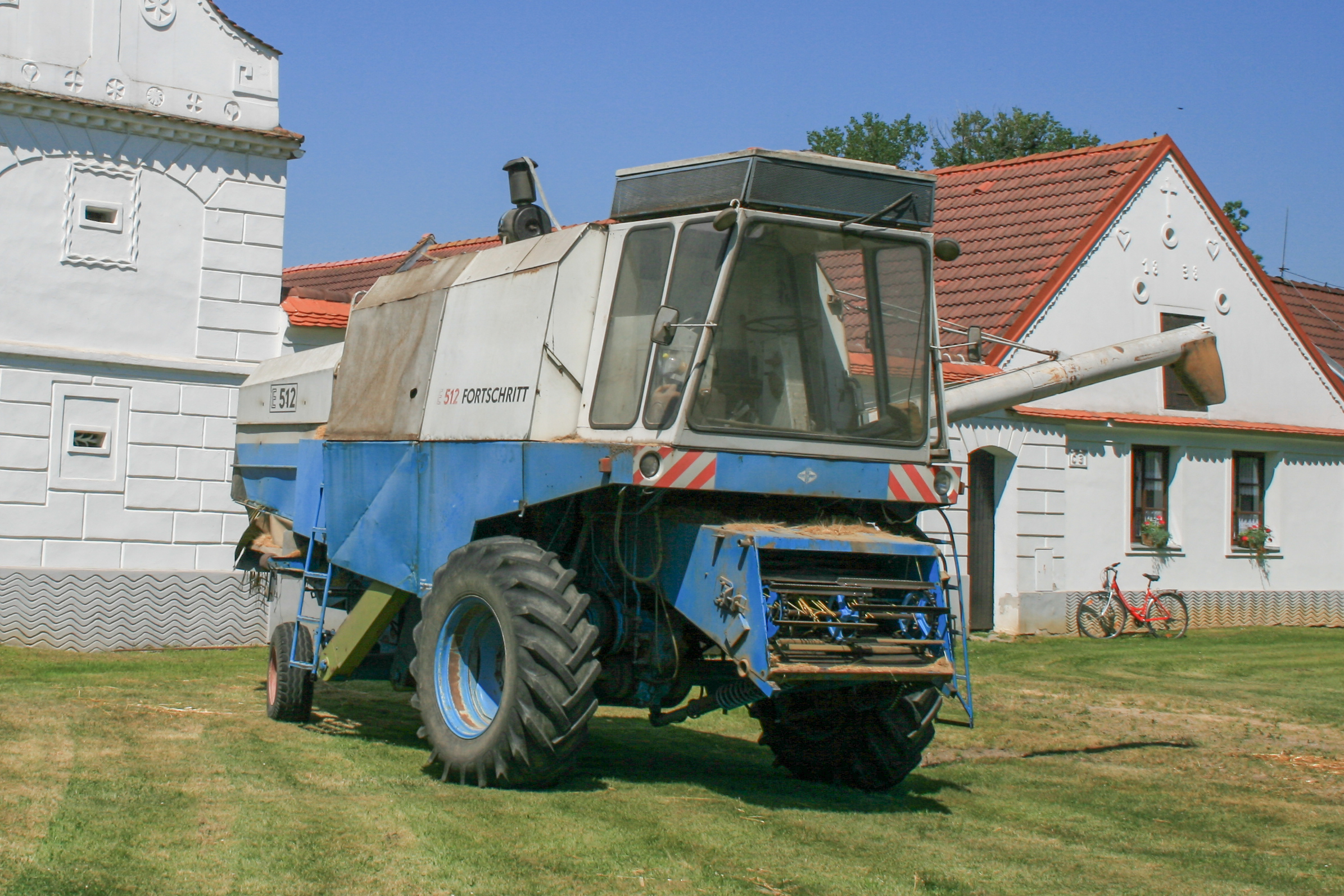
- A 1970s E 512
- Type: Combine harvester
- Manufacturer: VEB Mähdrescherwerk Bischofswerda/Singwitz
- Production: Singwitz, GDR; 1968–1988; 51,412 built
- Length: 7290 mm
- Width: 2893 mm
- Height: 3940 mm
- Weight: 5900 kg
- Propulsion: Tyres 15—30 AS (front) 10—15 AM (rear)
- Engine model: 4 VD 14,5/12-1 SRW (Straight-four Diesel, 6.56 dm^{3})
- Flywheel power: 77 kW
- Speed: 1.4…20 km/h
- Preceded by: Fortschritt E 170 series
- Succeeded by: Fortschritt E 514

The Fortschritt E 512 is a self-propelled combine harvester that was made by the East-German manufacturer VEB Mähdrescherwerk Bischofswerda/Singwitz, and sold under the Fortschritt brand. It is the first Fortschritt combine harvester that has been solely developed in the GDR. The E 512 succeeded the Fortschritt E 170 series. At the time of its introduction in the late 1960s, the E 512 was a modern, sought-after combine harvester that could compete well with high-performance combines made in Western countries, such as the Clayson 140 and the Claas Senator. In total, 51,412 units were made from 1968 until 1988, which makes the E 512 the East German combine harvester with the highest production figure.

== Development ==
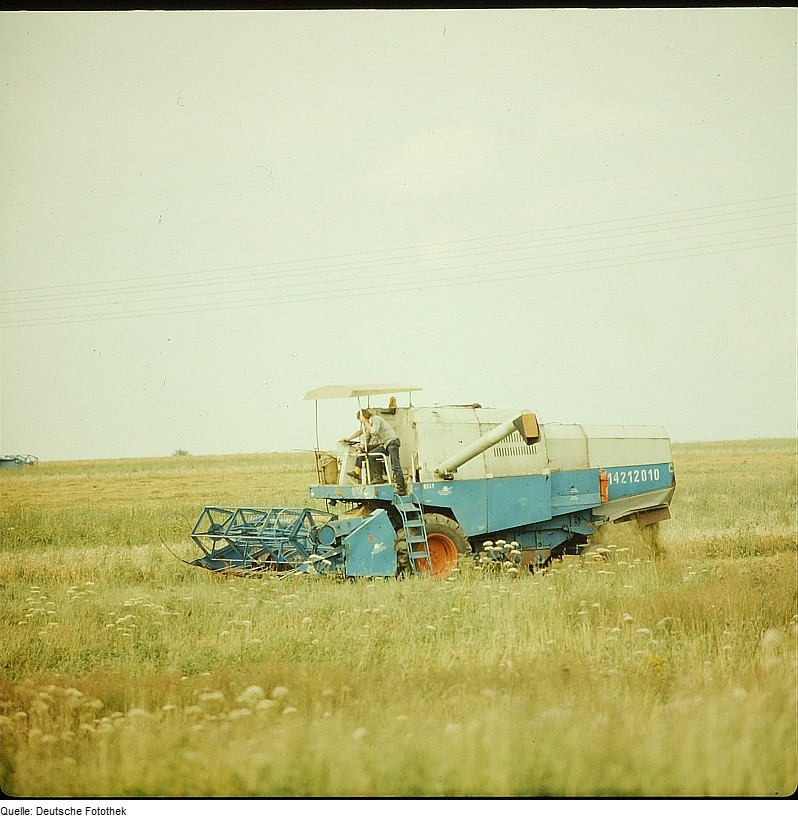
A Fortschritt E 512 in 1978

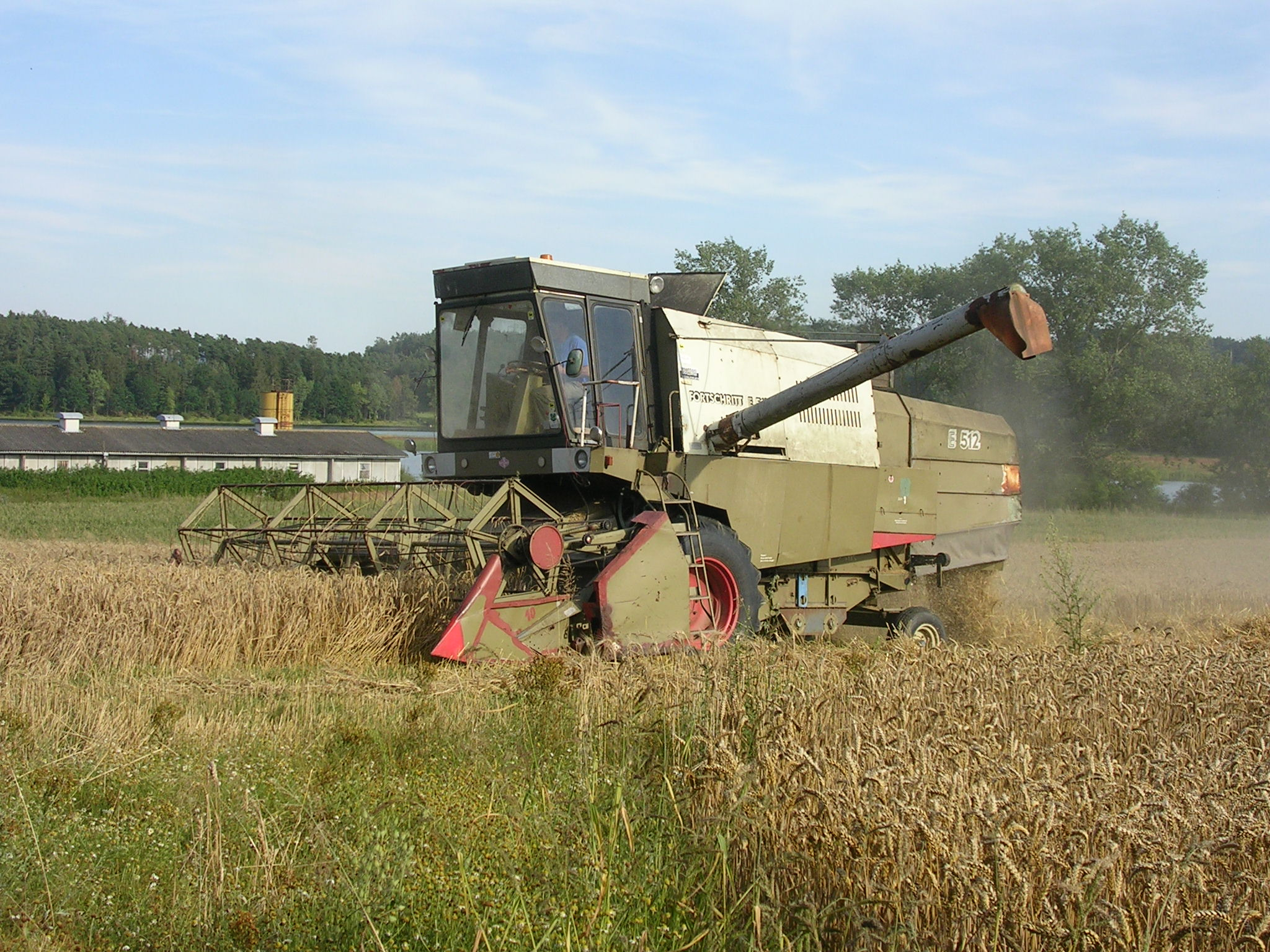
A late 1980s E 512 – its paint was olive-green, because it was cheaper to produce than blue paint

In the early 1950s, the GDR combine harvester production had shifted from stationary threshing mashines and pulled harvesters to the self-propelled combine harvesters of the E 170 series, a modified version of the S-4 Stalinets combine harvester. By the early 1960s, it had become clear that the E 170 series harvesters would soon be too small to be operated efficiently in the growing East German Agricultural Production Cooperatives. Thus, the E 170 series was developed into the Fortschritt E 510. The E 510, basically being an update of the already aging E 170 series, was tested during the 1963 harvesting season, but proved to be no significant improvement over the E 170 series. In February 1964, it was decided not to put the E 510 into series production, and instead develop a new combine harvester from scratch, the E 512.

In the 1964 harvesting season, several different combine harvesters, such as the Soviet SK-4, the Swedish Munktell, the West-German Claas Matador Gigant, the Belgian Clayson 140, and the E 510 prototype, were tested. Based upon the results of these tests, the E 512 was developed in the following two years. In the 1966 harvesting season, the first prototypes were tested by the factory, and they proved to be successful in the 1967 official state testing. A new testing method had been established in 1966, and the E 512 was the first agricultural harvesting machine alongside the forage harvester E 280 that was tested according to this new method. After completing the tests in 1967, approval for series production was given, and the first ten pre-production units were built the same year. In order to be able to begin series production, the combine harvester plant in Singwitz was modernised in 1968. Manufacturing machines from England, Austria, Czechoslovakia, and West Germany were purchased, and installed in the plant. These machines included a machine for steel sheet surface protection, a straw walker welding robot, and an automatic straw walker crankshaft forging machine.

In early 1969, the E 512 was presented at the Leipzig Trade Fair. Several improvements and updates to the Fortschritt E 512 were introduced throughout its series production. From 1969 onwards, the E 512 was available with a driver's cabin. An electronic, automatic cutting height leveling system was introduced in 1973, an electronic steering assisting system that helped keep the E 512 in a straight line, was offered from 1974. During the 1980s, the Fortschritt E 512's colour scheme was switched from blue and white to olive-green and white, because green paint was cheaper to produce in the GDR. From 1987, Fortschritt offered an on-board computer for the E 512 that could precisely calculate the corn loss.

== Technical description ==
The Fortschritt E 512 is a conventional straw-walker combine harvester, and has front-wheel drive with a continuously variable transmission. The corn passes through the E 512 in longitudinal fashion. This means that it enters the combine in front, and gets pulled into the mid-mounted threshing drum; the straw exits the machine in back, after getting cleaned in the straw walkers, which are installed in the E 512's rear compartment. The Fortschritt E 512 can be used for several different types of corn; it can be used on slopes with an angle of up to 8.1°. From the factory, headers with cutting widths of 3.6 m (12 ft), 4.2 m (14 ft), 4.8 m (16 ft), and 5.7 m (19 ft) were available. The E 512 can process up to 5 kg of material per second; its specific fuel consumption is 1062 dm^{3}·km^{−2} (litres per harvested square-kilometre of field). The E 512 can harvest approximately 7000...10,000 m^{2} of field per hour.

The threshing drum has a width of 1278 mm and a diameter of 600 mm. It is equipped with 8 rasp bars. It is driven by a belt that is hydraulically adjustable in length (continuously variable transmission), in order to adjust the threshing drum speed. The speed is adjustable between 603 and 1300 min^{−1}. The concave has 14 rasp bars, and its distance from the threshing drum can be quickly adjusted in three steps using a lever in the driver's cabin; fine adjusting is possible by turning the concave adjusting nut with a jaw spanner. The E 512 has four straw walkers with four steps each; the total straw walker aera is 5.2 m^{2}.

The E 512 is powered by an IFA 4 VD 14,5/12-1 SRW four-stroke diesel engine. This engine is a naturally aspirated, water-cooled pushrod straight-four engine with two crossflow cylinder heads. It has a helix-controlled inline injection pump, and M-System direct injection with central-sphere combustion chambers. With a cylinder bore of 120 mm and a stroke of 145 mm, it displaces 6.56 dm^{3}. It is rated 77 kW at 2000 min^{−1}, and produces a maximum torque of 392 N·m at 1350 min^{−1}.

The torque is sent from the engine to a manual three-speed gearbox, and to the main drive wheel, from which the threshing drum, the straw walkers, sieves, fan, corn conveyor, corn elevator, and header are driven. The three-speed gearbox is used solely for converting the torque that is sent to the front wheels. An additional continuously variable transmission allows finely adjusting the drive speed independently from the gearbox output shaft speed, so that the engine can always run at full power. The header is driven by a chain, and is hydraulically adjustable in height. The reel speed is hydraulically adjustable between 17 and 53 min^{−1}. The corn tank has a volume of 2.3 m^{2}; instead of a tank, the E 512 was also available with a sacking system that fills the corn directly into large jute sacks.
