= Production association =

Industrial business group, conglomerate in the fortmer Soviet Union

Production association (Russian: Производственное объединение) was a form of the organization of industry in the Soviet Union. According to the Great Soviet Encyclopedia, it is "a single specialized production and economic complex, which includes factories, plants, research, design, technological, and other organizations that have industrial relations with each other and centralized auxiliary and service production. The production units that make up the association are not separate legal entities". As a rule, it is managed by the management of its core enterprise, with the board of directors of its major enterprises serving as an advisory body.

Similar associations existed in other countries under Soviet influence, known under other terms, such as "Kombinat" in Poland and East Germany.

== Post-Soviet times ==
After the regaining of the independence of Lithuania in 1991, all production associations created in Lithuanian SSR were dissolved into several businesses, reorganized, or discontinued. Notable ones include toy manufacturer Neringa (dissolved), computer and computer components manufacturer Sigma (discontinued in 1991), Elfa (best known in the former Soviet Union for its stereo tape recorders; its main enterprise went bankrupt in 1993, other smaller parts were privatized, and their fates varied.), and fertilizer producer Azotas (its major plant was privatized in 1994 and in its place the joint-stock company Achema was created).

The term was preserved in the names of a number of enterprises in modern Russia and some post-Soviet states, but it does not have any legal meaning.

== See also ==
- Scientific production association
