= Fortschritt E 514 =

Self-propelled combine harvester

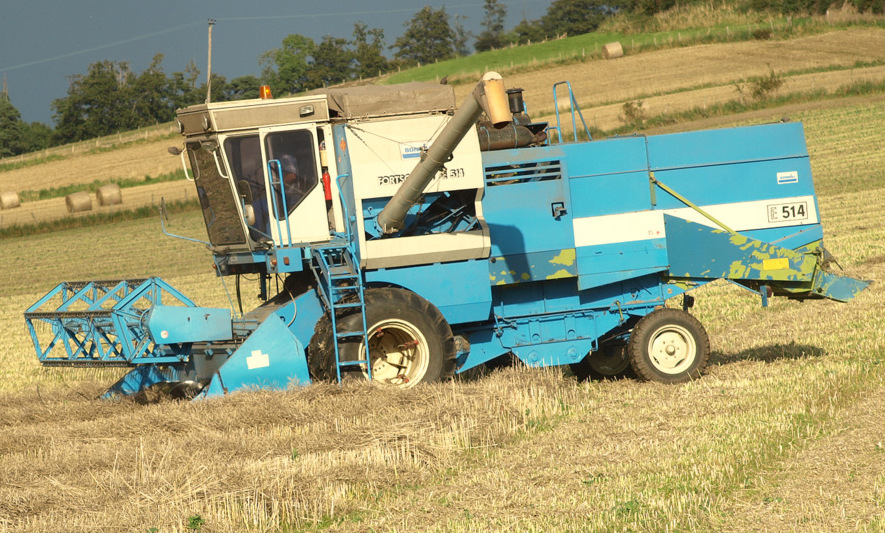
- An early Fortschritt E 514
- Type: Combine harvester
- Manufacturer: VEB Mähdrescherwerk Bischofswerda/Singwitz
- Production: Singwitz, GDR; 1982–1988
- Length: 7417 mm
- Width: 2879 mm
- Height: 3744 mm
- Weight: 6455 kg
- Propulsion: Tyres 18.4–30 12PR (front), 10–20 8PR (rear) or; Crawler tracks 700 mm, 7 bogie wheels (front), tyres 12.5-20 (rear)
- Engine model: 4 VD 14,5/12-1 SRW (Straight-four Diesel, 6.56 dm^{3})
- Flywheel power: 85 kW
- Speed: 1.4…20 km/h
- Preceded by: Fortschritt E 512

The Fortschritt E 514 is a self-propelled combine harvester, that was made by the East-German manufacturer VEB Mähdrescherwerk Bischofswerda/Singwitz in Singwitz, and sold under the Fortschritt brand. It is the successor to the Fortschritt E 512, which it did not manage to replace – the E 514 was produced alongside the E 512 from 1982 until 1988.

The E 514 is based upon the E 512, and thus shares the same basic design with the E 512. Compared with its predecessor, the E 514 can process more material per second. It also has an improved header drive mechanism, and a bigger corn tank.

== Technical description ==
The Fortschritt E 514 is a conventional straw-walker combine harvester, and has front-wheel drive with a continuously variable transmission. The corn passes through the E 514 in longitudinal fashion. This means that it enters the combine in front, and gets pulled into the mid-mounted threshing drum; the straw exits the machine in back, after getting cleaned in the straw walkers, which are installed in the E 514's rear compartment. The Fortschritt E 514 can be used for several different types of corn; it can be used on slopes with an angle of up to 8.1°. From the factory, headers with cutting widths of 3.6 m (12 ft), 4.2 m (14 ft), and 5.7 m (19 ft) were available. The E 514 can process up to 6 kg of material per second.

=== Threshing system ===
The threshing drum and concave are identical to the ones used in the Fortschritt E 512. The threshing drum has a width of 1278 mm and a diameter of 600 mm. It is equipped with 8 rasp bars. It is driven by a belt, that is hydraulically adjustable in length (CVT), in order to adjust the threshing drum speed. The speed is adjustable between 603 and 1600 min^{−1}. The concave has 14 rasp bars, and its distance from the threshing drum can be quickly adjusted in three steps using a lever in the driver's cabin; fine adjusting is possible by turning the concave adjusting nut with a jaw spanner. The E 514's threshing system has an improved impeller, that does not only move the material from the threshing drum to the straw walkers, but also separates the corn and straw, in order to improve the combine's overall performance.

=== Straw and corn processing ===
The combine has four straw walkers, with four steps each. Their total area is 5.2 m^{2}. The remaining straw can be processed in three ways: Placed in swaths on the field, chopped with a straw cutter, or placed on the field in stacks. The latter method is intended for plants with low straw yields.

The corn falls out of the threshing drum (and out of the straw walkers) onto the pan, from where it gets onto the sieves. The E 514 has two sieves, the adjustable top sieve (1.85 m^{2}), and the fixed bottom sieve (1.17 m^{2}). The cleaning fan that blows over the sieves is driven with a CVT, its speed can be adjusted from 242 to 775 min^{−1}.

=== Corn tank ===
The Fortschritt E 512's biggest design flaw is its corn tank – it has a capacity of only 2.3 m^{3}, and is thus too small. With the E 514, Fortschritt attempted to address this problem. Calculations of the corn tank size and ground pressure ratio showed that the best corn tank size would be 3.6 m^{3}; the E 514 was thus fitted with a corn tank of this size, that allowed longer unloading intervals.

=== Engine ===
The E 514 is powered by an IFA 4 VD 14,5/12-1 SRW four-stroke diesel engine. This engine is a naturally aspirated, water-cooled pushrod straight-four engine with two crossflow cylinder heads. It has a helix-controlled inline injection pump, and M-System direct injection with central-sphere combustion chambers. With a cylinder bore of 120 mm and a stroke of 145 mm, it displaces 6.56 dm^{3}. It is rated 85 kW at 2000 min^{−1}, and produces a maximum torque of 422 N·m at 1400 min^{−1}. The engine is mated with a dry dual-disc clutch. Compared with the E 512, the E 514 has better engine utilisation, which explains why the engine power output was increased.

=== Drivetrain ===
The Fortschritt E 514 has a belt system. From the engine, the torque is sent to the main drive-wheel with a belt, from where all the combine's systems are driven with belts, including the header. The torque for the front wheels is sent through a manual three-speed gearbox, and a belt CVT. The CVT ensures that the E 514's engine can always run at full power regardless of driving speed.

By default, the driven front axle has 18.4–30 12PR tyres. From the factory, crawler tracks with a width of 700 mm and 7 bogie wheels were available instead. On the rear steering axle, the E 514 has 10–20 8PR tyres. If fitted with crawler tracks, the rear tyres are slightly wider (12.5-20).

=== Auxiliary systems and assistance systems ===
The E 514 has hydraulically operated, power-assisted duo-duplex brakes, and a completely power-assisted, hydraulic steering system. In addition to that, Fortschritt offered several assistant systems, such as a steering assisting system (that helps keep the E 514 in a straight line by automatically correcting the steering angle), and a computer, that precisely calculates the corn loss.
