= Heiko =

Heiko may refer to:

- Heiko (given name) (including a list of people with the name)
- Heiko (film), a 2008 short film

== See also ==
- HEICO
- Hayko (disambiguation)
