= Neringa (name) =

Neringa is a Lithuanian feminine given name. Notable people with the name include:

- Neringa Abrutytė (born 1972), Lithuanian poet and translator
- Neringa Aidietytė (born 1983), Lithuanian racewalker
- Neringa Čereškevičienė (born 1966), creator of Lithuanian TV program and musical group Tele Bim-Bam
- Neringa Dangvydė (1975–2020), Lithuanian writer, poet, book illustrator, and literary critic
- Neringa Karosaitė (born 1980), Lithuanian badminton player
- Neringa Siaudikyte, Lithuanian singer and songwriter
- Neringa Venckienė (born 1971), Lithuanian lawyer and politician
