= Neringa (production association) =

Toy manufacturer in Lithuania, 1972–1992

Neringa (Vilnius Cultural Goods Production Association "Neringa", Lithuanian: Vilniaus kultūrinių prekių gamybinis susivienijimas "Neringa", Vilniaus KPGS "Neringa") was a production association in Lithuanian SSR best known as the major toy manufacturer in the country.

== History ==
After World War II there were several private businesses in toy manufacturing in Lithuania. In 1965 they were nationalized and put under the Ministry of Domestic Industry of the LSSR. In 1972 three major toy enterprises of Vilnius, "Žaislas" ("Toy"), "Lėlė" ("Doll") and "Vienybė" ("Unity") were merged to form "Neringa" association. In 1974 or 1975 the association was joined by the Metal Structure Plant in Bukčiai, in 1980 it incorporated the Kaunas company "Aidas" ("Echo"), which manufactured children's furniture, strollers and musical instruments: metallophones, harmonicas, etc. In its heyday the association had over 3,000 workers.

The production was mainly distributed wholesale. There also was a brand store in Vilnius. The association distributed toys not only in the country, but all over the Soviet Union.

As with most industries in the Soviet Union, the association had its share in manufacturing goods for the military. For example, the metal goods workshop "Aidas" had to manufacture mine casings and its canisters were sold, e.g., to the army of Jordan.

In 1988 the association became independent of the Ministry of Domestic Industry. In 1992, after the regaining of the independence of Lithuania, all production associations were dissolved into private companies. The resulting small toy companies were unable to retain good toy designers and to compete with foreign manufacturers. As a result of this and the closure of the large Russian market in mid-90s nearly all of them went bankrupt by the end of the 20th century.

== Key persons ==
- Algimantas Matulevičius, director (1981–1992)
