= Form und Zweck =

Design magazine in Germany (1956–2008)

- Editor-in-chief: Günter Höhne
- Former editors: Hein Köste
- Categories: Design magazine; Lifestyle magazine
- Publisher: Institute for Applied Art
- Founded: 1956
- Final issue: 2008
- Country: German Democratic Republic
- Based in: East Berlin
- Language: German

Form und Zweck (German: Form and Purpose) was an East German magazine which featured articles on design. The magazine was official journal of the German Democratic Republic. It existed between 1956 and 2008.

== History and profile ==
Started in 1956 Form und Zweck was published by the Institute for Applied Art. Its foundation was an indicator of the change in the East Germany's cultural policy. Because in the early days of the state housing architecture and city planning were emphasized as the preferred sites of socialist cultural identity. However, from the mid-1950s its cultural policy became focused on commodities and domestic spaces. The headquarters of the magazine was in East Berlin. Its target audience was professional designers and those who were interested in design.

Form und Zweck covered articles on design-related topics. It reflected official preference of the state over the development of form and design in the country. For instance, the magazine reinforced the use of plastic goods in line with the policies of the state.

One of the editors-in-chief was Hein Köster, who was fired from the post in 1983 following his article about a fictitious museum in Prenzlauerberg. Due to the fact that the content of the magazine was less checked by the authorities Köster managed to publish critical articles and to cover writings by architectural critics such as Lothar Kühne or Karl-Heinz Hüter. Günter Höhne was the last editor-in-chief of the magazine. Hans Aust was among its contributors.

Form und Zweck ceased publication in 2008.

== See also ==
- List of magazines in Germany
