= Fortschritt =

East German agricultural machinery brand

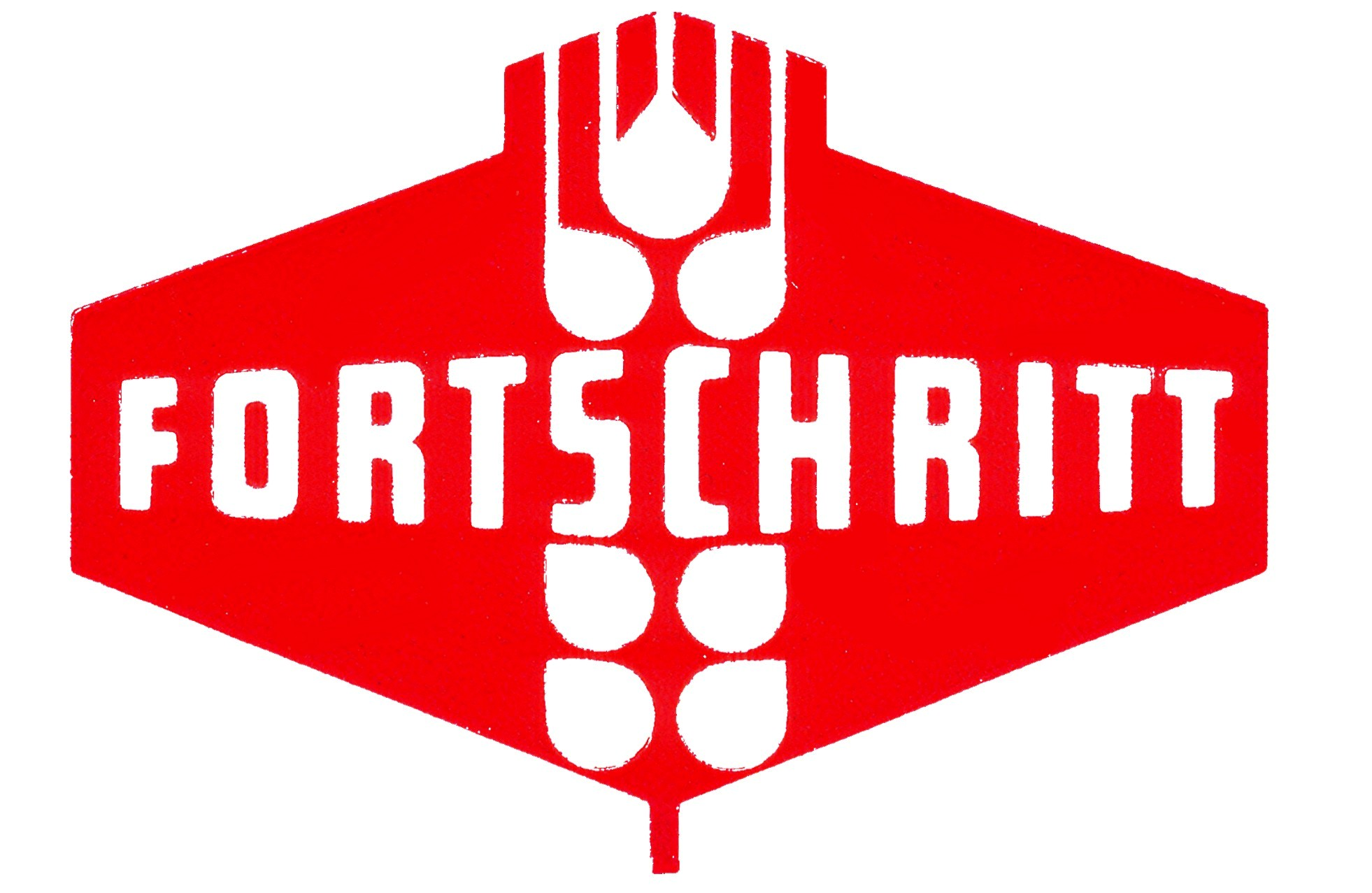
- Industry: Tractor, Agriculture
- Founded: 1951
- Defunct: 1997
- Headquarters: East Germany

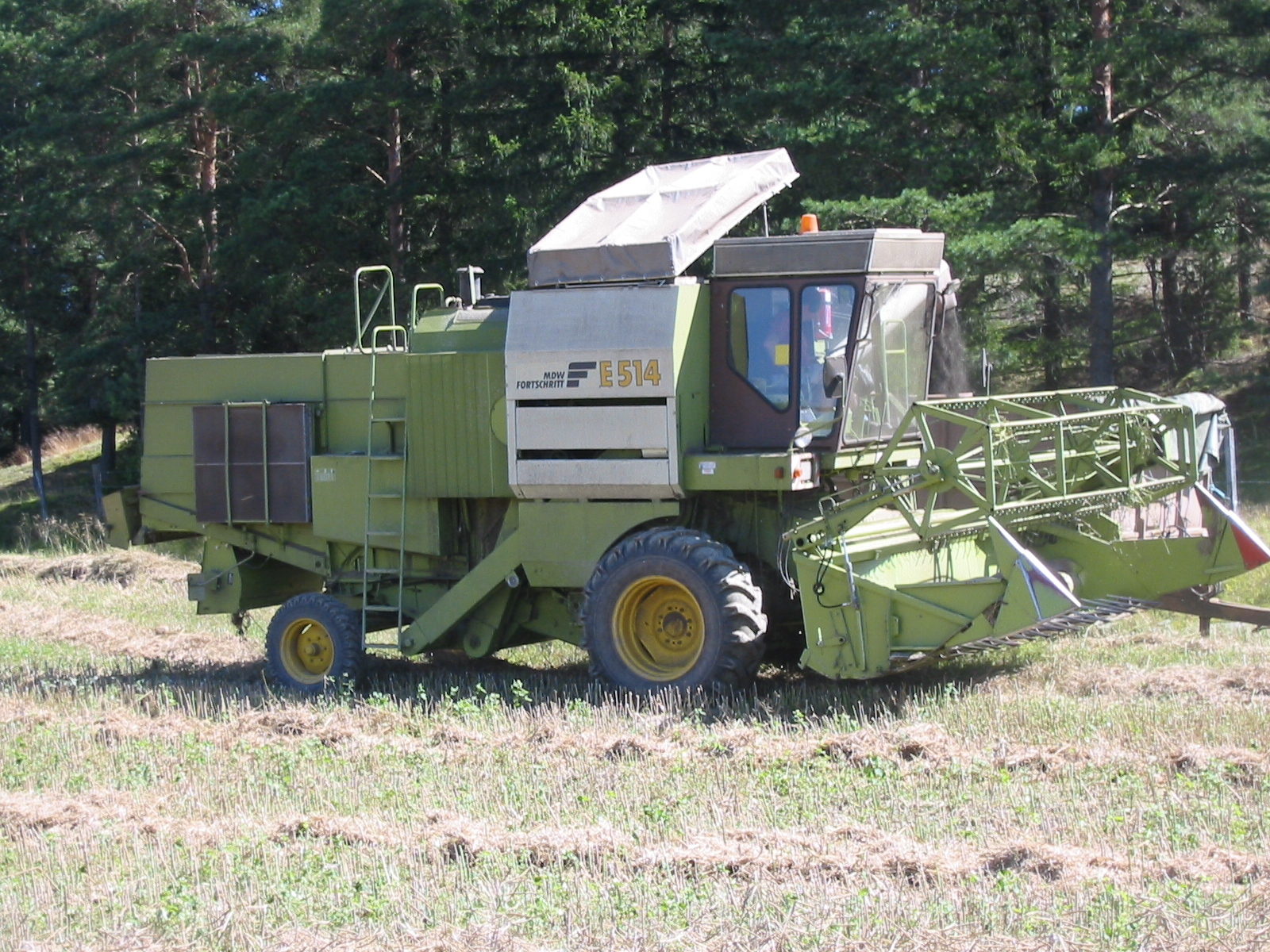
Fortschritt E 514 combine harvester

Fortschritt (German for "Progress") was an East German brand of tractors, combine harvesters and other agricultural machines made by VEB Fortschritt (part of the IFA) in Neustadt, Saxony. It was the largest agricultural machinery manufacturer in the nation.

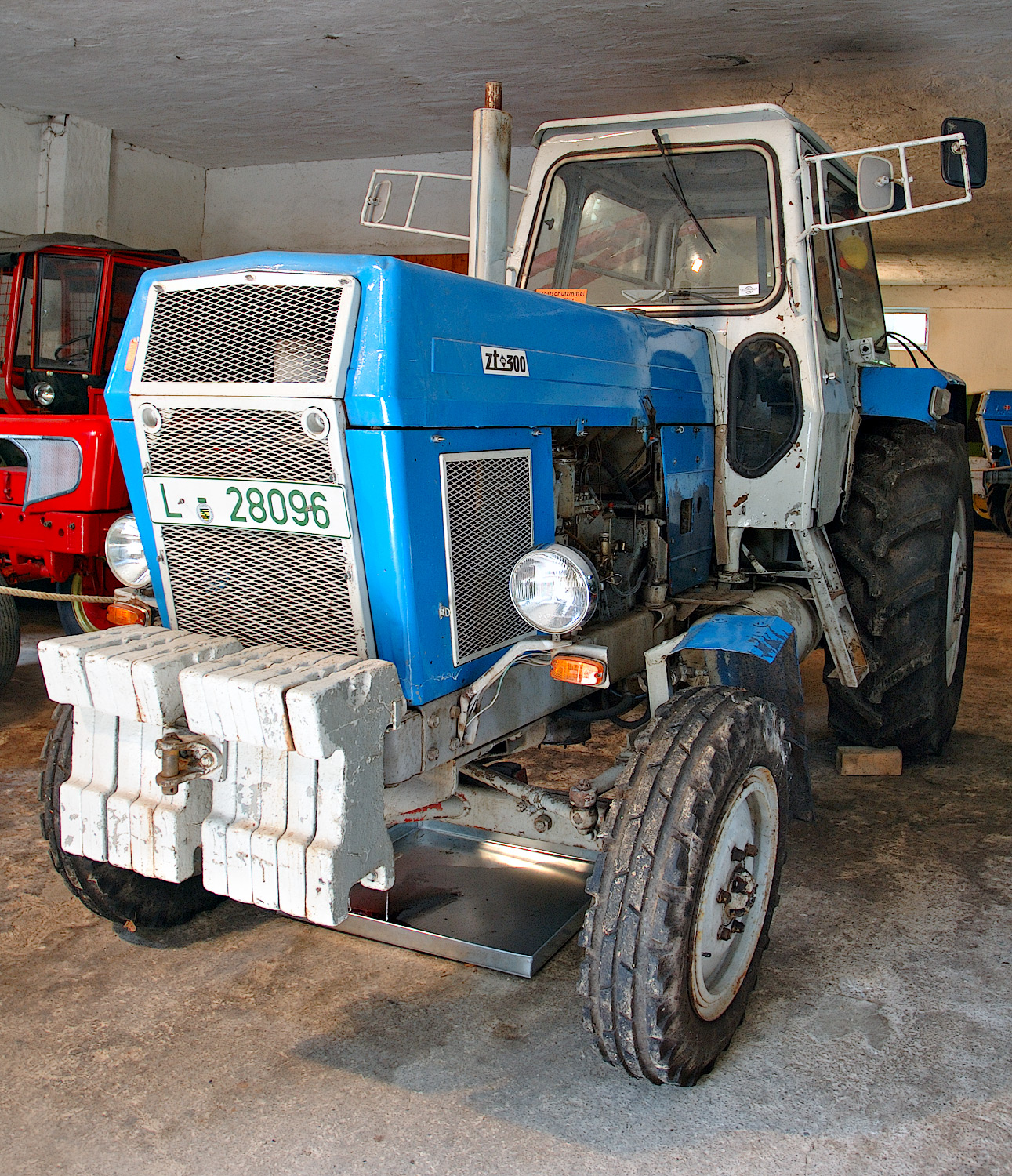
Fortschritt ZT 300 tractor

Fortschritt was taken over by Case IH in 1997. Since 2016, Chinese company Fortschritt Agritech Ltd. has been operating as Fortschritt and holds the manufacturing, marketing and sales rights of the Fortschritt brand. They currently produce balers, tipper trailers and windrowers
