= S-4 Stalinets =

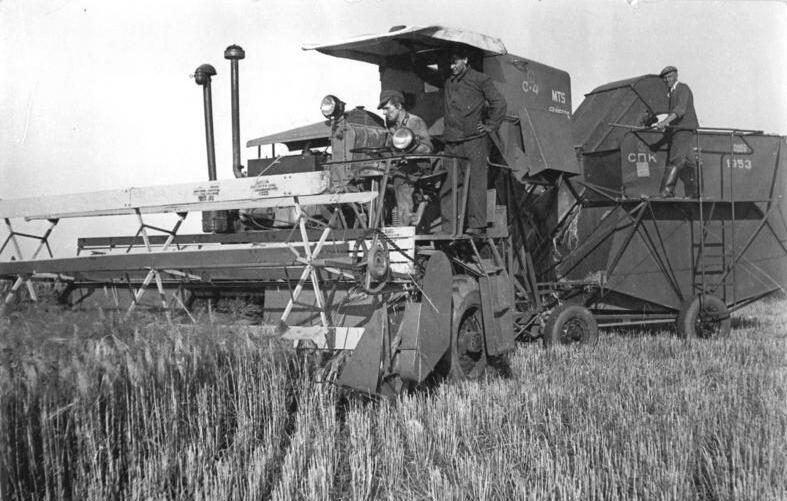
- An S-4 combine harvester in East Germany
- Type: Combine harvester
- Manufacturer: Krasnoyarsk combine harvester plant; Tula combine harvester plant; Syzranselmash plant; Taganrog combine harvester plant
- Production: 1947–1958
- Length: 8000 mm
- Width: 4300 mm
- Height: 3600 mm
- Weight: 5200 kg
- Propulsion: Tyres
- Engine model: ZIS-120 (Otto, 5.555 dm^{3})
- Flywheel power: 39 kW
- Speed: 1.7 to 14.6 km/h
- Preceded by: S-1 Stalinets
- Succeeded by: SK-3

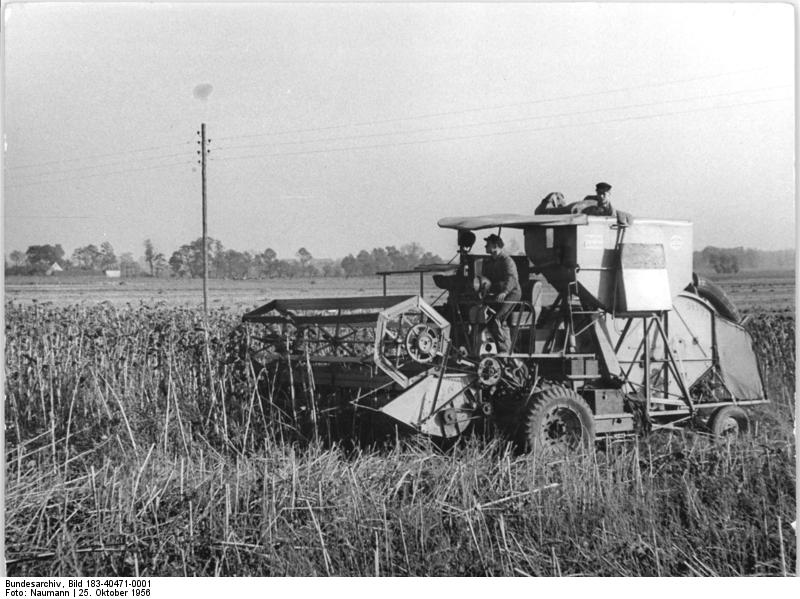
An East German Fortschritt E 171, a variant of the S-4 built under licence

The S-4 «Stalinets» (Russian: С-4 «Сталинец»), is a self-propelled combine harvester, made by several different combine harvester plants in the former Soviet Union, from 1947 until 1955. In 1955, the modernised variant, called the S-4M, was introduced; it was put out of production in 1958. In total, 29,582 units were built. In former East Germany, the S-4 combine was built under licence by the IFA as the Fortschritt E 170 series (E 171, E 173, E 174, E 175, E 176, and E 177), from 1954 until 1967. Unlike the original S-4, which is powered by an otto engine, the Fortschritt E 170 series combines were all powered by a diesel engine, and some of them came with a chaff waggon rather than a straw waggon.

The S-4 is the first self-propelled Soviet combine harvester, it succeeded the S-1, one of the early 1930s Soviet pulled combine harvesters. There is no evidence of existing S-2 and S-3 models, it is therefore likely that they were both cancelled during the development phase. When the S-4 was introduced in 1947, it was first built at the Krasnoyarsk combine harvester plant. The second generation of self-propelled Soviet combine harvesters, the SK-3, was introduced in 1958. In East Germany, the successor to the Fortschritt E 170 series was the Fortschritt E 512, an entirely new combine harvester, designed from scratch. A transition model, called the Fortschritt E 510, which was still based upon the 1947 S-4, had been developed, but was eventually not put into series production.

== Technical description ==
The S-4 is a conventional straw-walker combine harvester, and has front-wheel drive. The front axle has a track width of approximately 2400 mm, the rear axle has a track width of approximately 910 mm. The engine torque is sent through a manual four-speed gearbox with an additional two-speed reduction gearbox, and from the gearbox output shaft to the front axle with a belt. The belt's length is fixed, thus not allowing continuous variable driving speed. The corn passes through the S-4 in longitudinal fashion. It enters the combine in front, and gets pulled into the mid-mounted threshing drum; the straw exits the machine in back, after getting cleaned in the straw walkers installed in the S-4's rear compartment. Both four-metre and three-metre headers, hydraulically adjustable in height from 60 to 700 mm, were available for the S-4. The reel, cutter bar, header auger and corn conveyor are driven mechanically by belts and chains. The reel speed can be adjusted by swapping cogwheels in the header drivetrain, but the S-4 does not have fine reel speed adjusting.

The threshing drum has a width of 865 mm and a diameter of 550 mm. It is equipped with 8 rasp bars. It is driven by a belt, that is hydraulically adjustable in length (continuously variable transmission), in order to adjust the threshing drum speed. The speed is adjustable between 385 und 1350 min^{−1}. The concave's distance from the threshing drum can be adjusted with three turnbuckles. The S-4 has four straw walkers, and two adjustable sieves. The corn tank holds up to 1300 kg of corn. The original S-4 is powered by a 5.6 litre, 39 kW ZIS-120 otto engine. This engine has a very high fuel consumption of 18–20 litres per hour and was not well-suited for East Germany. East German Fortschritt E 170 series combines were instead fitted with the IFA EM 4-15-5 diesel engine, a swirl-chamber injected 6.024 dm^{3} four-cylinder unit, producing 40 kW at 1500/min. Its peak power is up to 44 kW. The engine is mounted in front, next to the driver's seat.

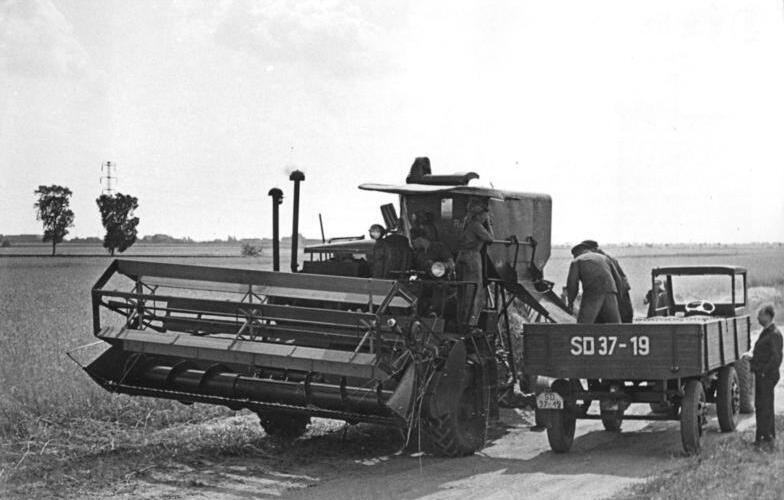
Grain unloading by gravity from hopper

== Fortschritt models ==
The Fortschritt models are almost exact copies of the S-4, however, there are some differences that are reflected by the different types of Fortschritt E 170 series combine harvesters. Unlike the S-4, Fortschritt combine harvesters have a GDR-made diesel engine, as well as other GDR-specific parts, such as the wheels. The technical drawings were converted from the Soviet GOST standard to the German DIN standard. The following list summarises the Fortschritt models' key characteristics:

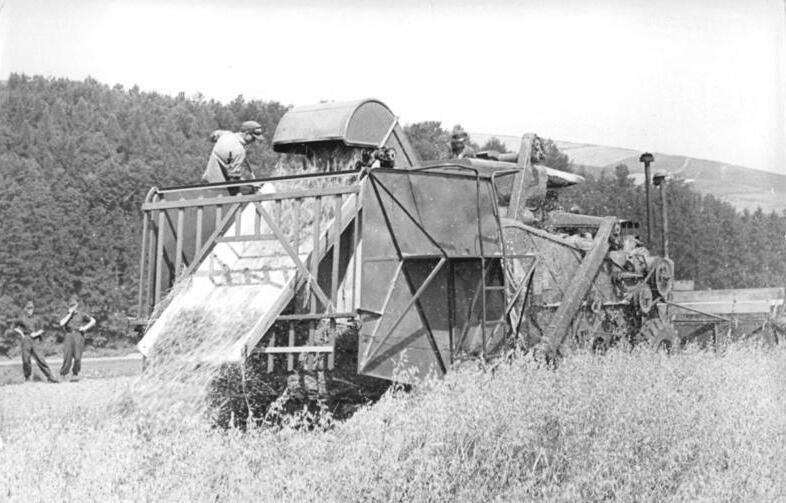
- A chute for placing straw in the field in a swath installed in the mower
  E 171: Like the base S-4, with a corn tank, and a chaff waggon.
- E 173: Like the E 171, but smaller header with a cutting width of 3.1 m.
- E 174: Improved 3.1 m header with a hydraulically adjustable reel, sack filler instead of corn tank; has a chaff waggon.
- E 175: Like the E 174, but with a 1.8 m^{3} corn tank.
- E 176: Like the E 175, but without a chaff waggon.
- E 177: Like the E 176, but with a sack filler instead of a corn tank.

The Fortschritt E 175 and E 177 soon became the standard models of the Fortschritt E 170 series, and are thus the models with the highest production figures. Fortschritt E 170 series combines were produced in Weimar (1954–1962) and then in Singwitz (1962–1967). The total produced in Weimar was 6,573 units.
