= Combine (enterprise) =

Term for industrial business groups

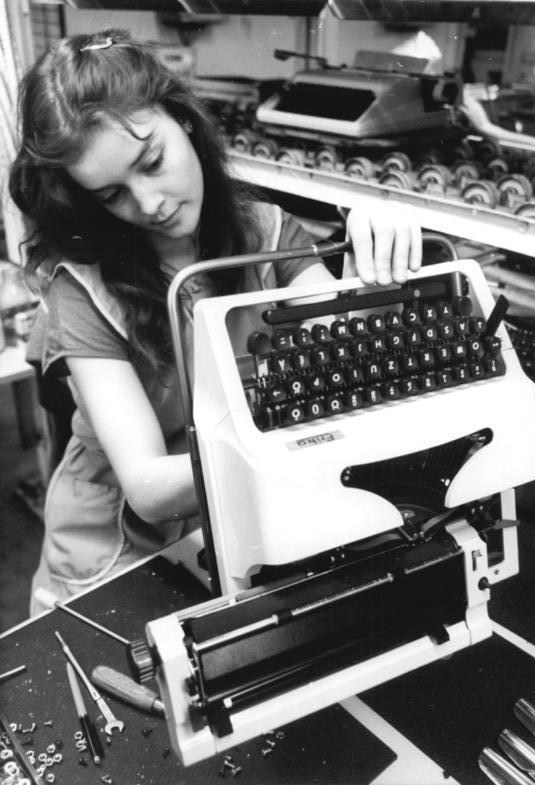
One of the 17,000 workers at the Kombinat Robotron in the German Democratic Republic in 1987 working to produce typewriters

Combine (Russian: Комбинат, romanized: Kombinat; Romanian: Combinat; Ukrainian: Комбінат) is a term for industrial business groups, conglomerates or trusts in the former socialist countries. Examples include VEB Kombinat Robotron, an electronics manufacturer, and IFA, a manufacturer of vehicles, both in East Germany, and the Erdenet copper combine in Mongolia.

== Influence ==
The model of the kombinat was an influence on the development of the Chinese danwei.

== See also ==
- Production association
